= Ottilien languages =

Ramu language family of Papua New Guinea

Ottilien
- Ramu Coast; Watam-Awar-Gamay
- Geographic distribution: Yawar Rural LLG, Madang Province, Papua New Guinea
- Linguistic classification: Ramu: Ramu proper; Lower Ramu; Ottilien

Language codes
- Glottolog: wagg1235

The Ottilien or Watam-Awar-Gamay languages are a small family of clearly related languages,

Watam–Kaian, Gamei (Mbore), and Bosman–Awar.

They are generally classified among the Ramu languages of northern Papua New Guinea.

The Ottilien languages are all spoken in Yawar Rural LLG, in locations mostly along the coast of Madang Province, Papua New Guinea.

Watam and Bosman share plural morphology with Lower Sepik (Nor–Pondo), supporting the Ramu – Lower Sepik language-family proposal.

The family is named for the mouth of the Ottilien River, now known as the Ramu.

== Phonemes ==
Usher (2020) reconstructs the consonant inventory as follows:

*m	*n		*ŋ
*p	*t	*s	*k
*mb	*nd	*ndz	*ŋg
*w	*ɾ	*j	*ɣ

*i	*ɨ	*u
*e	*ɐ	*o
	*a	

== Pronouns ==
Pronouns in proto-Watam-Awar-Gamay (proto-Ottilien) reconstructed by Foley (2005) are:

	singular	dual	plural
1st person		*aŋga	*ai
2nd person		*(n)oŋgo(a)	*ne
3rd person	*ma(n)	*maniŋg	*mi(n)

See also Lower Ramu languages#Pronouns.

Usher (2020) reconstructs the pronouns as:

	sg	du	pl
1	*ŋg[o]	*aŋga	*ai
2		*[n]oŋga	*ne(-n)
3	*ma(-n)		

== Proto-Ottilien ==
A phonological reconstruction of proto-Watam-Awar-Gamay (proto-Ottilien) has been proposed by Foley (2005).

proto-Watam-Awar-Gamay reconstructions (Foley 2005)

gloss	proto-Watam-Awar-Gamay	Watam	Kaian	Gamay	Bosmun	Awar
one	*kaku	kaku	kaku	kabe	koku	mbɨnə
two	*mbuniŋ	mbwoini	mbuniŋ	mbuniŋ	mbuniŋ	mbuni
three		giramot	giramaut	mbonkak	bonkak	mbribin
person	*namot	namot	namot	ramot	mot	mot
woman/mother		aem	meak	meak	mes/mam	məri/mam
father		aes	aes	aet	sate	sat
water		arum	ŋarum	puk	mok	mok
fire	*s(u)ək	sak	sak	tak	suək	suək
sun	*ra(u)	nau/ra	ra	ra	lau	rau
moon	*kər(v)i	ndoŋar	kare	karvɨi	kərvi	kəri
star		gwi	gwae	gwi	ɲjem	pot
canoe	*kor	kor	kor	kor	kor	kor
house		endau	endau	kak	tomuŋ	to
village		n(a)oŋ	noŋ	auŋ	wunis	ŋuni
breast	*mɨr	mur	mur	mɨr	mɨr	mɨr
tooth	*nda(r)	ndakai	ndakai	ndar	dar	ndar
blood		rumb	yakaind	rakaind	nimbit	rerik
bone	*ɣar	gagar	gagar	gagar	ɣar	ɣarɣar
tongue	*mi(m)	mi	memraŋ	mim	eitap	ɲjiekpun
ear	*kwar	kwar	kwar	kwar	kur	kur
eye	*rəmeak	namak	rameak	lamŋeak	rəmak	rəmaʔ
nose	*ŋgum	ŋgum	ŋgum	ŋgum	ŋgum	ŋgum
leg	*or ?	or	or	or	or	rue
hair		mbunat	sabrit	yakwar	twakarɨ	dəmbar
egg		yor	yor	lor	nuok	nuʔ
bird	*ŋgwarak	ŋgorak	ŋgorak	ŋgorak	gwarak	ŋgorak
leaf	*(ra)par	rapar	rapar	rapar	par	par
tree		padoŋ	paraŋ	ik	kən	kən
yesterday	*ɣur	ŋur	ŋaup	ŋaur	ɣur	gur
tomorrow	*ɣurap ?	ŋarap	ŋorap	ŋorap	vuarap	gurap
oar	*anup	anup	anup	nup	nuap	nop
betelnut	*mbok	meɲjak	mbok	mbok	mbok	mbok
lime	*awi(r)	ai	aipak	avir	verpak	virwa
sago	*veak	wak	weak	veak	ves	vek
pig	*rəkəm	markum	markum	markəm	rəkəm	rəgəm
crocodile		namkai	nomgai	mugmai	ŋgome	ŋgumi
snake	*ndop	mindop	mindop	nduop	ndup	kondok
name	*ɣi	wi	wi	i	ji	gi
mosquito	*ŋgit	naŋgit	naŋgit	ŋgit	ɲjet	ŋget
ground		wakar	wakar	tiakar	tesin	terik
feces	*yu/o	yo	yupak	lo	yuwur	ɲjit
hear	*varak	warak	warak	warak	vai	vai
hit		ruŋ	pi	pi	ŋara	ŋa
eat	*amb	amb	amb	amb	mba	mba
go	*saŋg	saŋg	saŋg	taŋg	saŋg	saŋg
come	*kɨp	rukup	rukup	kɨp	kɨp	kɨp
sit	*mbirak	mbirak	mbirak	mbirak	berak	mbirak
stand	*-tik	utik	utik	wɨtɨk	tis	tik
big		nakan	aneak	aɲek	ɣor	vret
good	*ya(o)ŋ	yaoŋ	yaoŋ	laŋ	yaŋ	yandi
black	*mbəkmbək	mbukmbuk	mbukmbuk	mbəkmbək	bəkbək	mbəkmbək
hot		wiwi	wai	ovai	vɨvi	gɨgɨr
cold		gagau	gagau	gagau	ɣiɣiat	rivut

Below, proto-Watam-Awar-Gamay is listed in comparison with four other Ramu languages that are closely related to, but not part of, Watam-Awar-Gamay: the Misegian languages Kire and Mikarew, and the Tanggu languages Tangu and Igom.

Proto-Watam-Awar-Gamay and Ramu comparisons (Foley 2005)

gloss	proto-Watam-Awar-Gamay	Kire	Mikarew	Tangu	Igom
one	*kaku	ibabira	aməra	wunwan	unuʔaka
two	*mbuniŋ	pʰunini	poni	munai	mokupea
three		pʰuni	pomənimkasam	munainwan	mokupea unuʔa
person	*namot	guma	guma	wanik	wuɣu
woman/mother		mbik	aim/ami	məin	məin
father		ndia	apisi	yavai	yap
water		mbɨ	cup	niam	niam
fire	*s(u)ək	vap	ariv	ruwuv/rogup	lugu
sun	*ra(u)	ra	are	gar	ŋgar
moon	*kər(v)i	kəniŋ	ekini	mənam	mənam
star		kam	mukope	riyɨndɨk	likian
canoe	*kor	kem	agiam		
house		vun/pen	tɨpeŋ	taŋ	taŋ
village		ŋgu	uŋip	məŋ	miaŋ
breast	*mɨr	ta	ote	ŋgyuav	gii
tooth	*nda(r)	thar	atarim	andar	dər
blood		vusun	wusi	irien	məy
bone	*ɣar	xar	aɣar	ɣavaŋ	ɣavaŋ
tongue	*mi(m)	ze	mɨzm	mamiakɨ	mimiaŋ
ear	*kwar	kwar	kwar	wukwar	ɣukwar
eye	*rəmeak	rumaʔ	tama	raik	raik
nose	*ŋgum	kwom	winiba	munwam	eɲjia
leg	*or ?	ruu	sue	miɲaŋ	mbwan
hair		rugun	tapanari	ɣasia/ŋgasia	rɨgesn
egg		rer	aror	mɨnduapen	warɨan
bird	*ŋgwarak	kworak	kwara	ŋgwarak	ŋgwarak
leaf	*(ra)par	far	tafarim	rapar	pat
tree		kʰa	tep	gək	ɣək
yesterday	*ɣur	gurmun	pɨkɨm	ruar	mugisi
tomorrow	*ɣurap ?	gurmun	kuromu	wumasan	mom
oar	*anup	(n)dab			iŋgap
betelnut	*mbok	puk	mis	miak	miak
lime	*awi(r)	rwi	iwim	uwuren	uɣum
sago	*veak	vik	wisim	giav/ŋiav	yaŋgia
pig	*rəkəm	dam	ta	ram	ram
crocodile		kum	koa	viari	laisaŋ
snake	*ndop	kuruk	kuru	kyuok	kiak
name	*ɣi	zin	izi	rigiav	rigiaŋ
mosquito	*ŋgit	ket	ci	ŋgwan	gwan
ground		nwiaʔan	ŋwas	nduv	ʃa
feces	*yu/o	vi(r)	buarim	gavig	miɲaŋ
hear	*varak	mbara?	orak	vara/bara	mwiari
hit		soʔ	sos	ŋak	mənaramu
eat	*amb	mbɨ	tama	ɣam/mi	kam
go	*saŋg	vu/ŋgu	usi	maŋ/wugi	gi
come	*kɨp	zə	si/sa	iɣ/giji	karigi
sit	*mbirak	peraʔ	apria	ipi/pindi	pwiaŋge
stand	*-tik	tʰək	cu	ɣambi/ləmbe	rambia
big		bakume	aruʔa	ruma/arum	arum
good	*ya(o)ŋ	vuŋ	aŋwi	swari/ara	yara
black	*mbəkmbək	pək	pək	ŋes/nəs	ŋiatʃ
hot		qurgur	fei	uŋtiki	varip
