= Gapun =

Village in Papua New Guinea

- Location within Papua New Guinea
- Coordinates: 4.028746°S 144.50304°E
- Country: Papua New Guinea
- Province: East Sepik Province
- LLG: Marienberg Rural LLG

Languages
  - Main languages: Tok Pisin and Tayap
- Time zone: UTC+10 (AEST)

Gapun is a village in Marienberg Rural LLG, East Sepik Province, Papua New Guinea, located near the mouth of the Sepik River. The language isolate Tayap is traditionally spoken in Gapun by the Tayap people. Gapun village is the sole Tayap settlement, while all other neighboring villages are inhabited by non-related ethnic groups. The sociolinguistic history of the village has been presented in textbooks as a case study on how and why language shift and language death occur.

The village is called Saŋgap in the Kopar language.

In 2018, a third of the village was burned down and abandoned due to violence among households. Some of the former residents fled to the nearby villages of Wongan (3.999326°S 144.532123°E), Watam (3.906592°S 144.545246°E), and Boroi. After this, fewer than 50 of the 200 residents remained.

== Geography ==
Gapun is located on a small hill overlooking the southern banks of the Sepik. The hill on which Gapun is located is part of a plateau that stretches from the village of Bosmun (4.176323°S 144.648727°E) in Yawar Rural LLG, Madang Province in the east to Gapun in the west. The hill used to be an island a few thousand years ago before alluvial sediment deposits pushed the coastline further northeast.

The village is located about 10 kilometers from the coast with an estimated population of 110 in 1992.

== Languages ==
Tok Pisin is now the primary language spoken in Gapun, but Tayap was historically the primary language spoken within the village.

Gapun is the only village where Tayap, a language isolate, is spoken. Gapun is currently undergoing a language shift from Tayap to Tok Pisin, since the Tayap people associate Tok Pisin with Christianity and modernity, while they associate their own traditional language with paganism and "backwardness." Further contributing to the decline of Tayap is the fact that it is not spoken in any other neighboring villages, as Gapun is surrounded by Lower Sepik-Ramu languages such as Kopar, Watam, and especially Adjora.

== See also ==
- Linguistic anthropology#Identity and intersubjectivity
- Tayap language
- Don Kulick
