= Grass languages =

Language family

Grass
- (dubious)
- Geographic distribution: East Sepik Province, Papua New Guinea
- Linguistic classification: Ramu–Lower Sepik: Ramu–Keram; Grass
- Subdivisions: Keram; Porapora

Language codes
- Glottolog: None

The Grass languages are a group of languages in the Ramu language family. It is accepted by Foley (2018), but not by Glottolog. They are spoken in East Sepik Province, Papua New Guinea, with a small number of speakers also located just across the provincial border in Madang Province.

== External relationships ==
Foley (2018) notes that Grass languages share very few lexical items with the other Ramu languages, with virtually no lexical cognates Banaro and Ap Ma. However, the Grass languages are still classified as Ramu due to widely shared morphosyntax and typology. Foley (2018: 205) leaves open the possibility of Grass being a third branch of the Lower Sepik-Ramu family, with Lower Sepik and Ramu being sister branches.

Like the neighboring Yuat languages, Grass languages distinguish between inclusive and exclusive first person pronouns, a feature not found in most other Papuan languages. This typological feature has diffused from Yuat into the Grass languages.

== Classifications ==
The original Grass language proposal, also known as Keram, included several languages, such as Banaro and Kambot (Ap Ma), that are no longer thought to be closely related to Adjora and Gorovu.

=== Laycock (1973) ===
Laycock (1973) rejected Kambot and noted that Banaro was lexically divergent, and therefore grouped it with the Grass family in a higher-level Grass stock, a position accepted by Pawley (2005).

Grass/Keram (Laycock)

- Banaro
- Grass proper: Aion (Ambakich), Adjora (Abu), and Gorovu.

=== Usher (2018) ===
Timothy Usher (as reported in Glottolog) broke it up still further, with only Abu (Adora) and Gorovu kept together (in a "Porapora River" or "Agoan" branch), Aion (Ambakich) and Kambot (Ap Ma) grouped with the Mongol–Langam languages, and Banaro left as a primary branch of Ramu proper.

=== Foley (2018) ===
Foley (2018) provides the following classification.

- Porapora languages: Aion (Ambakich), Gorovu, Adjora (Abu)
- Koam languages: Mongol, Langam, Yaul-Dimiri
- Banaro
- Ap Ma (Kambot / Botin)

Foley (2005) did not include the Koam languages within Grass, but added them to Grass in 2018.
