= Lower Ramu languages =

Two branches in the Ramu language family

Lower Ramu
- Ottilien–Misegian
- Geographic distribution: Yawar Rural LLG, Madang Province, Papua New Guinea
- Linguistic classification: Ramu: Ramu proper; Lower Ramu
- Subdivisions: Ottilien; Misegian (Ruboni)

Language codes
- Glottolog: lowe1439

The Lower Ramu or Ottilien–Misegian languages consist of two branches in the Ramu language family. They are all spoken in Yawar Rural LLG, Madang Province, Papua New Guinea.

== Classification ==
The Lower Ramu languages as classified by Usher and by Foley (2018) are:

Lower Ramu languages

- Ottilien languages
  - Watam, Kaian
  - Gamay (Borei)
  - Bosmun, Awar
- Misegian languages (Ruboni languages)
  - Mikarew (Aruamu)
  - Sepen, Kirei

Lower Ramu as presented in Foley (2018) has been reduced in scope from the classification given in Foley (2005), which is as follows.

Lower Ramu

- Watam-Awar-Gamay (WAG) = Ottilien
  - Watam, Kaian
  - Gamay
  - Bosmun, Awar
- Mikarew-Kire (MK) = Misegian (Ruboni)
- Tangu, Igom

The Ataitan languages, including Tangu and Igom, are not included in Foley (2018).

== Pronouns ==
Tentative proto-Lower Ramu pronoun reconstructions by Foley (2005) are:

| | singular | dual | plural |
|---|---|---|---|
| 1st person | *ŋgu | *aŋga | *ai |
| 2nd person | *nu | *(n)oŋgo(a) | *ni/e |
| 3rd person | *ma(n) | *mani(ŋg) | *mV(n) |

== Cognates ==
Like cognates between proto-Lower Sepik and proto-Lower Ramu listed by Foley (2005) are:

| gloss | proto-Lower Sepik | proto-Lower Ramu |
|---|---|---|
| tongue | *minɨŋ | *mi(m) |
| ear | *kwand- | *kwar |
| lime | *awi(r) | *awi(r) |
| eat | *am(b) | *am(b) |
