= Kambot language =

Keram language spoken in Papua New Guinea

Kambot
- Ap Ma
- Native to: Papua New Guinea
- Region: East Sepik Province
- Native speakers: 10,000 (2010)
- Language family: Ramu–Keram: Keram; East Keram; Kambot
- Dialects: Kambaramba

Language codes
- ISO 639-3: kbx
- Glottolog: apma1241
- ELP: Ap Ma

Kambot a.k.a. Ap Ma (Ap Ma Botin, Botin, also Karaube), is a Keram language of Papua New Guinea. Compared to its nearest relative, Ambakich, Kambot drops the first segment from polysyllabic words.

Kambot is spoken in Kambot village (4.281558°S 144.139582°E), Keram Rural LLG, East Sepik Province.

== Classification ==
Kambot was assigned to the Grass family within Ramu by Laycock and Z'graggen (1975). Foley (2005) finds the data does not support this assignment, but re-adds them to the Grass family in 2018. Foley and Ross (2005) agree that the language belongs to the Ramu – Lower Sepik family. Usher restores it to the Ramu family, but closer to the Mongol–Langam languages.

== Phonology ==
Ap Ma consonants are:

p	t		k
ᵐb	ⁿd	ᶮʤ	ᵑg
m	n	ɲ	ŋ
	s		
	r ~ l		
w		j	

== Pronouns ==
Foley (1986) proposed that Kambot had borrowed its pronouns from the Iatmul language of the Sepik family (Ndu languages). His suggestion was that nyɨ 'I' (1sg), wɨn 'thou' (2sg), and nun 'ye' (2pl) are taken from Iatmul nyɨn 'thou', wɨn 'I', and nɨn 'we', with a crossover of person. That is, the Iatmul may have called the Kambot nyɨn "you", and they then used that pronoun for themselves, resulting in it meaning "I". However, Ross (2005) and Pawley (2005) show that the pronoun set has not been borrowed. The Kambot pronouns are indigenous, as they have apparent cognates in Ramu languages. Similarly, the Iatmul pronouns have not been borrowed from Kambot, as they have cognates in other Ndu languages.

Comparison of Kambot PNs with Ramu languages
PN	Kambot	Kambaramba	Banaro	Langam	Arafundi
1sg	nyɨ	ni	(uŋɡu)	ñi	ñiŋ
2sg	wɨn	wɨ	u	wo	(nan)
2pl	nun	(wɨni)	nu	(wuni)	nuŋ
