= Keram =

Keram may refer to:

== Papua New Guinea ==
- Keram Rural LLG, East Sepik Province
- Keram languages
- Keram River

== People with the name ==
- Keramuddin Keram (born 1956), Afghan politician
- Keram Malicki-Sánchez (born 1974), Canadian actor and singer
