= Pondi language =

Keram language spoken in Papua New Guinea

Langam
- Pondi
- Native to: Papua New Guinea
- Region: East Sepik Province
- Native speakers: 300 (2020)
- Language family: Ramu–Keram: Keram; Mongol–Langam; Langam

Language codes
- ISO 639-3: lnm
- Glottolog: lang1328
- ELP: Langam
- Location within Papua New Guinea
- Coordinates: 4.30109°S 143.883676°E

Pondi, also known as Langam, is a Keram language spoken in Langam village (4.30109°S 143.883676°E) of Keram Rural LLG, East Sepik Province, Papua New Guinea. The majority of Pondi speakers are ethnic Pondis. Due to the small community in which Pondi is spoken, the language has no known dialect. The most notable language variation in Pondi is based on age, as the older generations are more fluent. It is related both Ulwa and Mwaki. Pondi is endangered because of the growing use and popularity of the Tok Pisin language, which is used more by the younger generations of speakers. The language is predicted to not be spoken in the next one hundred years. The lexicon of the Pondi language has many words acquired from other languages; however, it is nearly impossible to know the origins of these words.

== Classification ==
Pondi is classified within the Mongol-Langam subgroup, also known as the Ulmapo subgroup. This subgroup includes Pondi, Mwakai, and Ulwa. There remains uncertainty around whether Mongol-Langam languages may comprise a larger subgroup of Keram River languages, evidenced by similar pronouns and suppletion pattens in Pondi and other regional non-Mongol-Langam languages like Ambakich and Kambot.

== Geographical Distribution ==
Spoken only in Langam village, Pondi's geographical extent is minimal and there are no recorded dialects. Langam village is situated in a linguistically diverse region, with several non-mutually-intelligible languages spoken in nearby villages. Pondi speakers have contact with nearby languages like Angoram, Kambot, and Mwakai, but intergroup communication is conducted in Tok Pisin.

== Phonology ==
Pondi has a total of 22 phonemes, with 13 consonants, 6 vowels, and 2 diphthongs. Pondi's vowel series is typologically standard, but it has fewer than average consonants. Pondi contains no rhotic consonant or voiced fricative, as well as no non-prenasalized voiced stops or affricates.

=== Consonants ===
Pondi has an inventory of 13 consonants. Pondi contains three voiceless stops: /p/ (labial), /t/ (alveolar), and /k/ (velar). Their voiced counterparts only appear as prenasalized articulations. The voiced affricate /ⁿdʒ/ similarly exists as strictly prenasalized. The three voiced consonants and the single voiced affricate are limited in their distribution, appearing word-initially or word-medially, but never word-finally. Pondi contains three nasal consonants, /m/ (labial), /n/ (alveolar), and /ɲ/ (velar). Pondi contains one liquid: /l/ (alveolar), one fricative: /s/ (alveolar). finally, there are two glides, /w/ (labial) and /j/ (palatal).

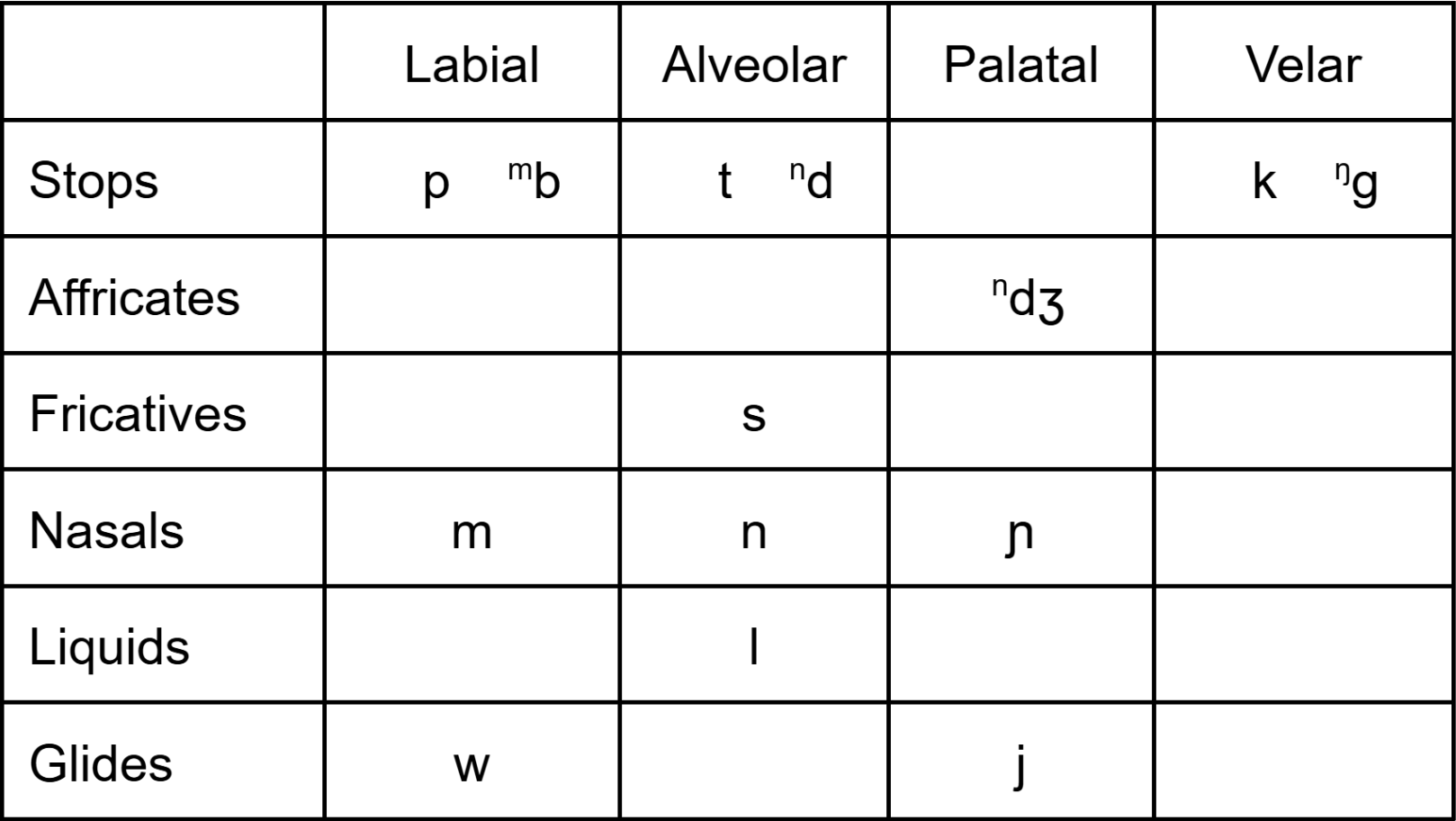
IPA-style consonant table for Pondi, adapted from Barlow (2020).

=== Vowels ===
Pondi contains three high vowels: /i/ (front, unrounded), /ɨ/ (central, unrounded), and /u/ (back, rounded). The high back vowel /ɨ/ is commonly denoted by /ï/. The language has two mid vowels: /e/ (front, unrounded) and /o/ (central, unrounded). Finally, Pondi has one low vowel: /a/ (back, rounded).

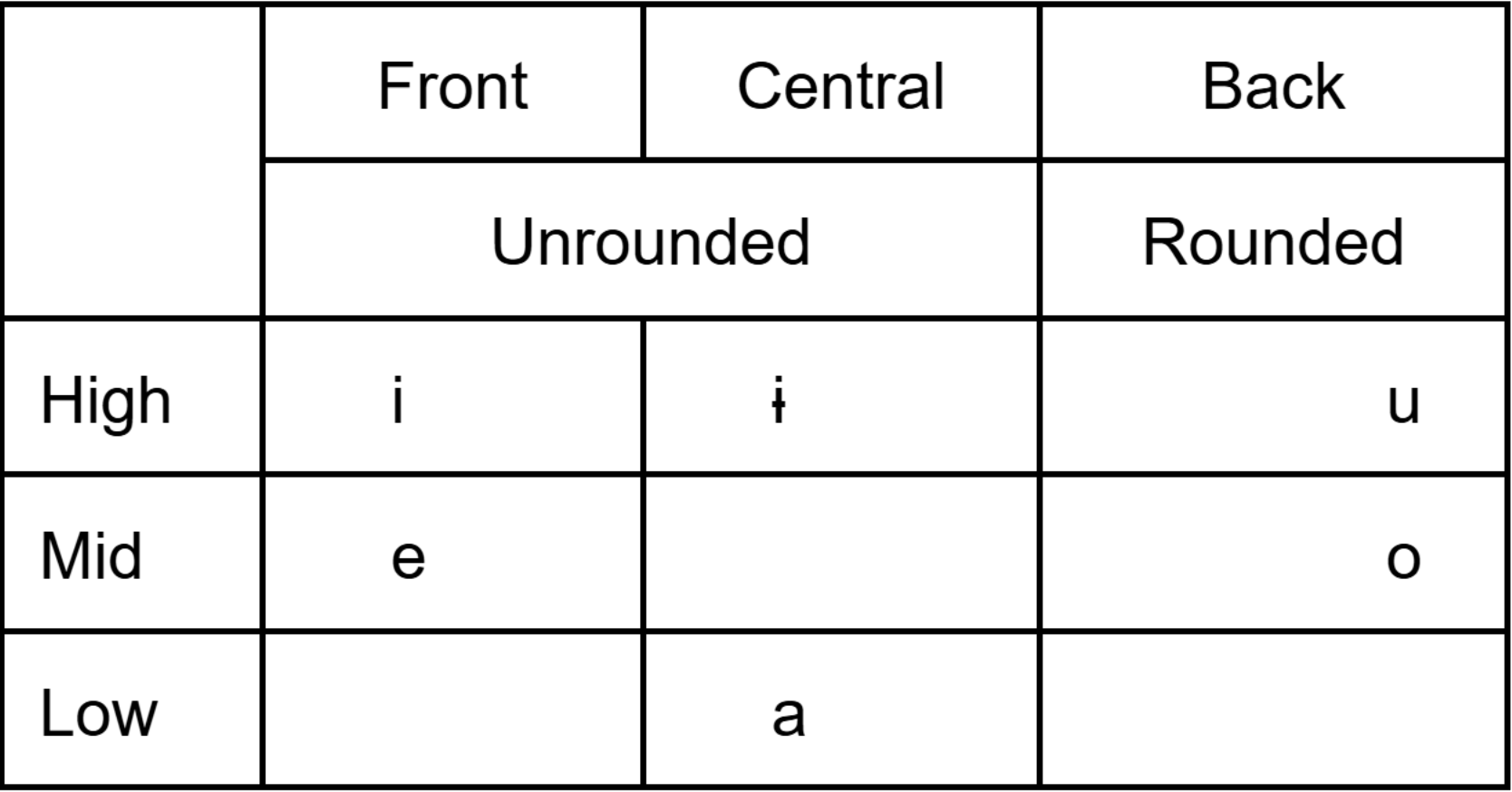
IPA-style vowel table for Pondi.

The two Pondi diphthongs, [a^{j}] and [a^{w}], each feature the low-central vowel [a] as their nucleus, with either a palatalized or labialized offglide.
