= KBX =

KBX may refer to:

- kbx, ISO 639-3 language code for Kambot language
- KBX, a Library of Congress Classification
- Kirby Cross railway station, UK national rail code KBX
- Karachi Bunder And Sidings railway station, Pakistan station code KBX
- PH-KBX, aircraft registration of Dutch royal family
