= Karawari =

Karawari may refer to:

- Karawari language of Papua New Guinea
- Karawari Rural LLG of Papua New Guinea
- Homalonesiota karawari (sp. beetle - Homalonesiota)
