= Mbore language =

Language

Mbore
- Gamei
- Native to: Papua New Guinea
- Region: Madang Province
- Native speakers: 2,100 (2003)
- Language family: Ramu: Ramu proper; Lower Ramu; Ottilien; Mbore
- Dialects: Boroi; Borewar; Botbot

Language codes
- ISO 639-3: gai
- Glottolog: bore1247
- ELP: Borei
- Coordinates: 4.066061°S 144.730692°E

Mbore (Borei, Mborei) a.k.a. Gamei (Gamai) is a Lower Ramu language of Papua New Guinea. It is spoken in the villages of Gamei (4.066061°S 144.730692°E) and Boroi in Yawar Rural LLG, Bogia District, Madang Province.

Its closest relatives are the Watam and Kaian languages, both of which lie upriver from Kopar, a village situated at the mouth of the Sepik River.
