= Aiome =

Aiome is a city in Papua New Guinea. It may also refer to,

- Aiome language
- Aiome Airport
