= Ruboni Range =

Hill in Madang Province, Papua New Guinea

- Location within Papua New Guinea

Geography
- State: Papua New Guinea
- Range coordinates: 4.25528°S 144.83365°E

The Ruboni Range is a mountain range in Papua New Guinea.

Various Ramu languages are spoken in the mountain range.

== See also ==
- Ruboni languages
