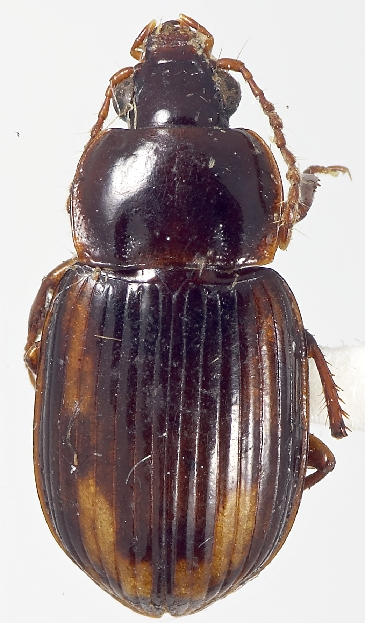
- Cosmodiscus picturatus

Scientific classification
- Kingdom: Animalia
- Phylum: Arthropoda
- Class: Insecta
- Order: Coleoptera
- Suborder: Adephaga
- Family: Carabidae
- Tribe: Abacetini
- Genus: Cosmodiscus; Sloane, 1907

Synonyms
- Celioinkosa Straneo, 1951

= Cosmodiscus =

Genus of beetles

Cosmodiscus is a genus of beetles in the family Carabidae, first described by Thomas Gibson Sloane in 1907.

== Species ==
Cosmodiscus contains the following species:

- Cosmodiscus brunneus Darlington, 1962 (New Guinea)
- Cosmodiscus latus Andrewes, 1947 (Myanmar)
- Cosmodiscus louwerensi Straneo, 1940 (Indonesia)
- Cosmodiscus picturatus Andrewes, 1920 (India)
- Cosmodiscus platynotus (Bates, 1873) (Japan, India, Myanmar, and Indonesia)
- Cosmodiscus rubripictus Sloane, 1907 (Indonesia, New Guinea, and Australia)
- Cosmodiscus rufolimbatus Jedlicka, 1936 (Philippines)
- Cosmodiscus umeralis Andrewes, 1937 (Indonesia)
