= Akukem language =

Ramu language spoken in Papua New Guinea

Sepen
- Akukem
- Akɨghɨm
- Native to: Papua New Guinea
- Region: Madang Province
- Native speakers: 650 (2003)
- Language family: Ramu: Ramu proper; Lower Ramu; Misegian; Sepen

Language codes
- ISO 639-3: spm
- Glottolog: sepe1240
- ELP: Sepen

Sepen is a Ramu language of Yawar Rural LLG, Madang Province, Papua New Guinea. Speakers prefer the name Akukem.
