= RMK (disambiguation) =

RMK may refer to:

- RMK-BRJ, an American construction consortium of four of the largest American companies
- rmk, the ISO 639-3 code for Romkun, a variant of Iski language
- Renmark Airport, the IATA code RMK
- Simrik Airlines, the ICAO code RMK
- Reichsmusikkammer, a music regulating company in Nazi Germany
- Radio Miyazaki K.K., a broadcasting station in Miyazaki Prefecture, Japan
- Robert Moses' Kin, an American dance company
- Republican Movement of Karelia, a Karelian regionalist and separatist organization
