= Ulwa language =

Ulwa language may refer to:

- Yaul language of Papua New Guinea
- Ulwa language (Sumo) of Nicaragua
