= Tanggu (disambiguation) =

Tanggu may refer to:

- Tanggu District, district of Tianjin, China
- Port of Tianjin, formerly Port of Tanggu
- Tanggu Truce, signed in the Tanggu District
- Tanggu (drum), a type of Chinese drum
- Tanggu language, a Ramu language of Papua New Guinea
- Tanggu Pass
