= Tayap language =

Endangered Papuan language

Tayap
- Gapun
- Tayap mer
- Native to: Papua New Guinea
- Region: Gapun village, Marienberg Rural LLG, East Sepik Province
- Native speakers: <50 (2020)
- Language family: Torricelli or language isolate: Sepik Coast; Tayap–Marienberg; Tayap

Language codes
- ISO 639-3: gpn
- Glottolog: taia1239
- ELP: Taiap
- Location within Papua New Guinea
- Coordinates: 4.028746°S 144.50304°E

Tayap (also spelled Taiap; called Gapun in earlier literature, after the name of the village in which it is spoken) is an endangered Papuan language spoken by fewer than 50 people in Gapun village of Marienberg Rural LLG in East Sepik Province, Papua New Guinea (4.028746°S 144.50304°E, located just to the south of the Sepik River mouth near the coast). It is being replaced by the national language and lingua franca Tok Pisin.

== History ==
The first European to describe Tayap was Georg Höltker, a German missionary-linguist, in 1937. Höltker spent three hours in the village and collected a word list of 125 words, which he published in 1938. He wrote that “it will be awhile before any other researcher ‘stumbles across’ Gapun, if only because of the small chances of worthwhile academic yields in this tiny village community, and also because of the inconvenient and arduous route leading to this linguistic island”.

Höltker's list was all that was known about Tayap in literature until the early 1970s, when the Australian linguist Donald Laycock travelled around the lower Sepik to collect basic vocabulary lists that allowed him to identify and propose classifications of the many languages spoken there. Tayap and its speakers have been extensively studied by linguistic anthropologist Don Kulick since the mid-1980s. The language is described in detail in Tayap Grammar and Dictionary: The Life and Death of a Papuan Language and in A Death in the Rainforest: How a Language and a Way of Life Came to an End in Papua New Guinea.

Until World War II, when Japanese soldiers occupied the area and caused the villagers to flee into the rainforest, Gapun was located on a hill that several thousand years earlier had been an island in the sea that receded and formed the lower Sepik River. This indicates that Tayap may be the descendant of an ancient, autochthonous language that was already in place before the various waves of migration from the inland to the coast began occurring thousands of years ago. Foley (2018) also speculates that Tayap could have been part of a larger language family that was spoken on the island before the arrival of Lower Sepik speakers. As the coastline moved further northeast, Lower Sepik speakers migrated from the foothills into the new land areas created by the receding waters.

== Classification ==
Tayap is not related to the neighboring Lower Sepik languages, though a relationship to the more distant Torricelli family has been proposed by Usher (2020).

In the 1970s, Australian linguist Donald Laycock classified Tayap (which he called "Gapun") as a sub-phylum of the Sepik-Ramu language phylum, on the basis of Georg Höltker's 1938 word list and a few verb paradigms that Laycock gathered from two speakers.

Kulick and Terrill (2019) found no evidence that Tayap is related to the Lower Sepik languages, another branch of the erstwhile Sepik-Ramu phylum. They conclude that Tayap is a language isolate, though they do not compare it to other language families, as would be required to establish Tayap as an independent language family. Comparative vocabulary demonstrates the lexical aberrancy of Tayap as compared to the surrounding Lower Sepik languages: e.g. sene 'two' (cf. proto-Lower Sepik *ri-pa-), neke 'ear' (*kwand-), ŋgino 'eye' (*tambri), tar 'hear' (*and-), min 'breast' (*nɨŋgay), nɨŋg 'bone' (*sariŋamp), malɨt 'tongue' (*minɨŋ), mayar 'leaf' (*nɨmpramp) among the Holman et al. (2008) ranking of the Swadesh list. Cultural vocabulary such as 'village', 'canoe', 'oar', and 'lime', as well as the basic words awin 'water' (cf. *arɨm) and a 'eat' (cf. *am ~ *amb), may be shared with Lower Sepik languages. The word karep 'moon' is shared specifically with Kopar (karep). However, most basic vocabulary items have no apparent cognates in surrounding languages.

Matthew Dryer (2024), as cited in Andrey Drinfield (2024), classifies Tayap as part of the East Torricelli branch of the Torricelli language family.

== Sociolinguistics ==
Up to 2018, Gapun was the only village where Tayap is spoken, although some speakers of the language also lived in neighboring villages such as Wongan and Watam, having moved there because of marriage or as a result of conflicts over land or sorcery in Gapun. However, in 2018, a third of Gapun village was burned down and abandoned due to violence among households. Some of the former residents fled to the nearby villages of Wongan (3.999326°S 144.532123°E), Watam (3.906592°S 144.545246°E), and Boroi. Fewer than 50 of the village's original 200 residents remain.

As a result of colonial activity, Gapun villagers subconsciously associate Tok Pisin with Christianity, modernity and masculinity, and they associate Tayap with paganism, "backwardness", disruptive femininity and childish stubbornness. As a result, Tayap is being increasingly, but neither consciously nor deliberately, replaced by Tok Pisin, even though the villagers all express positive sentiments towards it and insist that they want their children to speak the language. Villagers express bewilderment towards the fact that their children no longer actively speak Tayap, and believe that they have, out of stubbornness, decided to reject Tayap entirely, and that they have chosen to speak Tok Pisin instead.

Unlike the neighboring patrilineal Lower Sepik-Ramu speakers, Tayap speakers are matrilineal. Tayap is typologically very different from the neighboring Lower Sepik-Ramu languages.

== Phonology ==
Consonants
		Labial	Alveolar	Postalveolar	Palatal	Velar
Nasal		m	n			ŋ
Plosive	plain	p	t			k
Plosive	prenasal	ᵐb ⟨mb⟩	ⁿd ⟨nd⟩	ⁿdʒ ⟨nj⟩		ᵑɡ ⟨ŋg⟩
Fricative			s			
Liquid			r			
Semivowel		w			j ⟨y⟩	

Vowels
	Front	Central	Back
Close	i		u
Mid	ɛ ⟨e⟩	ɵ~ø ⟨ɨ⟩	ɔ ⟨o⟩
Back		a	

== Pronouns ==
Tayap free pronouns in absolutive case, and object suffixes in the realis, are:

Free pronouns
	sg	pl
1	ŋa	yim
2	yu	yum
3m	ŋɨ	ŋgɨ
3f	ŋgu	ŋgɨ

Object suffixes
	sg	du	pl
1	-i	-mɨ	
2	-u	-mɨ	
3m	-ŋgɨ	-mɨ	-mbɨ
3f	-ku	-mɨ	-mbɨ

== Grammar ==
Like many Sepik languages, Tayap is a synthetic language. Verbs are the most elaborated area of the grammar. They are complex, fusional and massively suppletive, with opaque verbal morphology including unpredictable conjugation class, both in terms of membership and formal marking.

Tayap distinguishes between realis and irrealis stems and suffixes. Verbal suffixes distinguish between Subject/Agent (S/A) and Object (O), which is marked by discontinuous morphemes in some conjugations. The ergative case (A) is marked by free pronouns and noun phrases, while the absolutive (S/O) does not have marked forms. As in many ergative Papuan languages, the ergative marker is not always included, as it is optional.

=== Nouns ===
Nouns generally do not mark number themselves, although there is a small class of largely human nouns which mark plural, and a smaller class which mark dual. These categories, where marked, are largely marked by partial or full suppletion. Oblique cases, largely local, are marked by clitics attached to the end of the oblique noun phrase.

=== Gender ===
Like many languages of the Sepik-Ramu basin, Tayap has masculine and feminine genders.

There are two genders, masculine and feminine, marked not on the noun itself but on deictics, the ergative marker, suppletive verbal stems and verbal object suffixes. The unmarked, generic form of all nouns, including animate nouns, even humans, is feminine: however, a male referent may be masculine. Another criterion is size and shape: long, thin and large referents tend to be masculine; short, stocky and small referents tend to be feminine. This type of gender-assignment system is typical of the Sepik region. Gender is only ever marked in the singular, never in the dual or plural.

== Lexicon ==
Tayap has many loanwords from the Kopar and Adjora languages.

Selected Tayap words from Kulick & Terrill (2019), pp. 442–454:

=== Vertebrates ===
gloss	Tayap
pig	mbor
domesticated dog	nje
tree possum, cuscus	enamb
ground possum	síw
bandicoot	sasik
rat, mouse	ŋgabugar, kokosik, njip, mangɨm
sugar glider	ŋgesiŋe
flying fox	njakep
bat	sumusumu
tree kangaroo species	kanuŋg
crocodile	orem
snake	aram
snake, types of	ambonor; arambwar; aramŋgor; atemb; karewa; kanakai aramŋgor; nɨŋɨr aram; pake; and
venomous snake species	mbumjor; kombɨn
lizard, types of	agin; akirónda; amanep; mbutak; ŋgararik; ŋgogrodak; ŋgurbewat; kurbi; masukondep; onjaŋnoŋor; tapetak
frog	pasákeke
large brown water bullfrog	uráŋgeba
tadpole	mbókokɨr < kokɨr ‘head’
fish	ŋgomar
freshwater fish	aiyo, ndɨdɨmaŋ, ŋgomákokɨr, orɨnd, semb
catfish	tokine
large eel	ŋgem

=== Invertebrates ===
gloss	Tayap
shrimp	sasu
small shrimp	sasupat
freshwater lobster	keymare
crab	kosep, ŋgarorak, sasápoke
hermit crab	pisik
shelled slug	kandip
clam, types of	eporaŋ, oyaŋ
mosquito	at
mosquito, type of	aiawaŋgar; indagawr; iurok; mbunbun; mɨriŋa at; njakepma arɨt; njeyewɨr at; ŋgurpan
ant	sɨwɨr
ant, type of	kandap; ŋgugrub; kambobai; rewitoto; sɨwɨrdɨdɨm; sɨwɨrkararkarar
termite	agu; kamus
spider	tomɨktomɨk
spider of the ground	tomɨktomɨk sumbwaŋa
house spider	tomɨktomɨk patɨrŋa (lit. ‘spider of the house’)
centipede	yandum
firefly	ŋgudum
bee	mbadɨŋ
bee, type of	arúmbatak kunemb; metawr
butterfly, moth	mumuk
caterpillars without fur	atɨr
caterpillars with fur	nɨŋgasin
beetle	tutumb
beetle, type of	arawer; mbirkraw onko; ŋgabugrip
beetle grub, type of	kɨmɨrɨk; komɨ; urukuruk
wasp	kɨkri
fly	arúmbatak
biting horsefly	tetei
blue fly	arúmbatak wasow (literally ’fly death’)
fruit fly, gnat	ipipir
scorpion	katáwa
millipede	kakámatik
walking stick	nekan
praying mantis	ŋgat
worm	kekékato
earwig	ikinŋan yandum
wood louse	tɨtɨpreŋ
cicada	ŋgaratgarat, kikik
grasshopper	njojok, njajak
cockroach	sasawraŋ, numbutik
bedbug	ndedeŋ
flea	itum
louse	pakɨnd
leech	mbímaŋ
mite	kandap

=== Sago-related vocabulary ===
gloss	Tayap
flour	muna
a kind of rubbery pancake	tamwai
broken pot shard	pambram
tennis ball-sized sago chunk	muna kokɨr, which literally means ‘sago head’
fire	paŋgɨp
congeal	munakumund
sago jelly	mum
sago soup	wawan
large chisel	makor or yasuk
tree	wot
crown of the palm	mar
sawdust	tawar
long funnel	iko or ndadum
coconut fiber strainer	waris
palm fronds	kondew
cakes of sago flour	munakatar
small benches made of branches	kokɨparaŋ
short sago-pounder made of a single piece of wood	yasuk
basket	saiput

In Tayap, a felled sago palm tree can be divided into 7 parts. The Tayap names are listed below, from the base (wot) to the crown (mar).

- wot
- wotŋa orom
- orom
- ndagŋa orom
- ndag
- marŋa orom
- mar

The word orom means ‘in the vicinity of’.

=== Clan names ===
There are five Tayap clans:

gloss	Tayap
crocodile	orem
dog	nje
parrot	karar
pig	mbor
flying fox	njakep

== See also ==
- Linguistic anthropology#Identity and intersubjectivity
- Gapun
- Don Kulick
