= LNM =

LNM or lnm may refer to:

- LNM Holdings, a former steel company, now part of ArcelorMittal
- LNM Institute of Information Technology, Jaipur, India
- lnm, Langam language (ISO 639-3 abbreviation), language of New Guinea
- Laban ng Masa, an electoral coalition in the Philippines
- Lebanese National Movement, political front active in the early days of the Lebanese Civil War
- Lecture Notes in Mathematics, a book series in the field of mathematics
- Liga Norte de México, a Mexican baseball minor league
- Louisiana Naval Militia, a defunct military reserve of the United States Navy
