= Tamolan languages =

Ramu language family of Papua New Guinea

Tamolan
- Guam River
- Geographic distribution: Guam River, Madang Province, Papua New Guinea
- Linguistic classification: Ramu: Ramu proper; Tamolan–Ataitan; Tamolan

Language codes
- Glottolog: tamo1242

The Tamolan languages are a small family of clearly related languages spoken in the region of the Guam River in Madang Province, Papua New Guinea.

== Languages ==
The Tamolan languages are:

- Tamolan
  - Inapang (dialect continuum)
    - Midsivindi
    - Itutang (Isarikan)
    - Yigavesakama
  - Chini–Iski
    - Akrukay (Chini)
    - Iski (dialect continuum)
      - Romkun
      - Breri

Kominimung and Igana are said to also be Tamolan languages, but no data has been collected to establish that.

Tamolan is classified among the Ramu languages of northern Papua New Guinea.

== Phonemes ==
Usher (2020) reconstructs the consonant inventory as follows:

| | | Bilabial | Alveolar | Palatal | Velar |
|---|---|---|---|---|---|
| Nasal | | *m | *n | | *ŋ |
| Plosive | plain | *p | *t | | *k |
| Plosive | prenasalized | *ᵐb | *ⁿd | | *ᵑg |
| Affricate | | | *ⁿdz | | |
| Fricative | | | *s | | |
| Liquid | | *w | *ɾ | *j | *ɣ |

Vowels are *i *ʉ *u *a.

== Pronouns ==
Usher (2020) reconstructs the pronouns as:

| | sg | du | pl |
|---|---|---|---|
| 1 | *uku | *aŋgʉ | *ani |
| 2 | *un | *uŋgʉ | *uni |
| 3 | *an, *ma | ? | ? |

Plus 1sg object *na.

Proto-Tamolan–Ataitan (Proto-Guam–Moam) is very similar, and nearly identical to Proto-Moam.
