= Kominimung language =

Ramu language of Papua New Guinea

Kominimung
- Native to: Papua New Guinea
- Region: Madang Province
- Native speakers: 320 (2003)
- Language family: Ramu: Ramu proper; Tamolan–Ataitan; Tamolan?; Kominimung

Language codes
- ISO 639-3: xoi
- Glottolog: komi1271
- ELP: Kominimung

Kominimung is a poorly known Ramu language of Papua New Guinea.
