= MZU =

MZU or mzu may refer to:

- Inapang language (ISO 639-3: mzu), a Ramu language of Papua New Guinea
- Mizoram University, a central university under the University Grants Commission, Government of India
- Muzaffarpur Airport (IATA: MZU), an airport located in Muzaffarpur, Bihar, India
