= Igana language =

Ramu language of Papua New Guinea

Igana
- Native to: Papua New Guinea
- Region: Madang Province
- Native speakers: 200 (2003)
- Language family: Ramu: Ramu proper; Tamolan–Ataitan; Tamolan?; Igana

Language codes
- ISO 639-3: igg
- Glottolog: igan1243
- ELP: Igana

Igana is a poorly known probable Ramu language of Papua New Guinea.
