= GRQ =

GRQ or grq may refer to:

- Groningen Airport Eelde, Netherlands, IATA code GRQ
- Gorovu language, Papua New Guinea, ISO 639-3 language code grq
