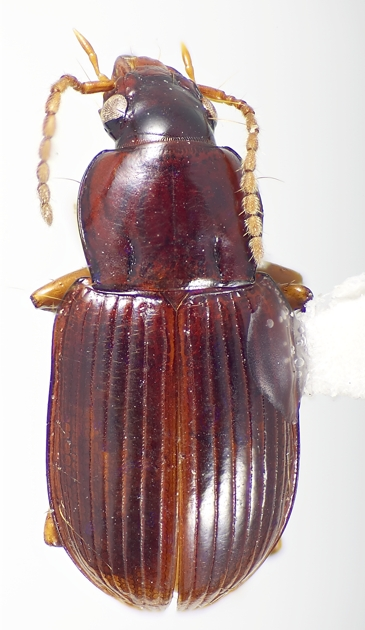
- Tiferonia parva

Scientific classification
- Domain: Eukaryota
- Kingdom: Animalia
- Phylum: Arthropoda
- Class: Insecta
- Order: Coleoptera
- Suborder: Adephaga
- Family: Carabidae
- Tribe: Abacetini
- Genus: Tiferonia; Darlington, 1962

= Tiferonia =

Genus of beetles

Tiferonia is a genus of beetle in the family Carabidae first described by Philip Jackson Darlington Jr. in 1962.

== Species ==
Tiferonia contains the following six species:

- Tiferonia brunnea (Jedlicka, 1935) (Philippines)
- Tiferonia leytensis Will, 2020 (Philippines)
- Tiferonia parva Darlington, 1962 (Indonesia and New Guinea)
- Tiferonia schoutedeni (Straneo, 1943) (Central African Republic and Democratic Republic of the Congo)
- Tiferonia sumatrensis Fedorenko, 2022
- Tiferonia trapezicollis Fedorenko, 2022
