= Cerabilia =

Scientific classification
- Domain: Eukaryota
- Kingdom: Animalia
- Phylum: Arthropoda
- Class: Insecta
- Order: Coleoptera
- Suborder: Adephaga
- Family: Carabidae
- Tribe: Abacetini
- Genus: Cerabilia; Laporte, 1867

Synonyms
- Nelidus Chaudoir, 1878; Zabronothus Broun, 1893; Australomasoreus Baehr, 2007

Genus of beetles

Cerabilia is a genus of beetles in the family Carabidae first described by François-Louis Laporte, comte de Castelnau in 1867. They are found in Australia and New Caledonia.

== Species ==
Cerabilia contains the following 61 species:

- Cerabilia aite Will, 2020
- Cerabilia amaroides (Moore, 1965)
- Cerabilia amieuensis Will, 2020
- Cerabilia aphela (Broun, 1912)
- Cerabilia apicesecta Will, 2020
- Cerabilia australiensis Will, 2020
- Cerabilia australis (Chaudoir, 1878)
- Cerabilia bellensis Will, 2020
- Cerabilia blatta Will, 2020
- Cerabilia danbullaensis Will, 2020
- Cerabilia discosetosa Will, 2020
- Cerabilia dominatrix Will, 2020
- Cerabilia drupa Will, 2020
- Cerabilia edentata Will, 2020
- Cerabilia espee Will, 2020
- Cerabilia francisca Will, 2020
- Cerabilia gigas Will, 2020
- Cerabilia haigensis Will, 2020
- Cerabilia intermedia (Moore, 1965)
- Cerabilia inversa Will, 2020
- Cerabilia iridescens Will, 2020
- Cerabilia kalkajaka Will, 2020
- Cerabilia kanakorum Will, 2020
- Cerabilia klingonorum Will, 2020
- Cerabilia koghisensis Will, 2020
- Cerabilia letalis Will, 2020
- Cerabilia lewisensis Will, 2020
- Cerabilia loxandroides Will, 2020
- Cerabilia major (Broun, 1912)
- Cerabilia maori LaPorte, 1867
- Cerabilia minor (Moore, 1965)
- Cerabilia monteithi (Baehr, 2007)
- Cerabilia montivaga Will, 2020
- Cerabilia moorei Will, 2020
- Cerabilia mouensis Will, 2020
- Cerabilia mudda Will, 2020
- Cerabilia nana Will, 2020
- Cerabilia neocaledonica Will, 2020
- Cerabilia oblonga (Broun, 1910)
- Cerabilia oodiformis Will, 2020
- Cerabilia orbiculata Will, 2020
- Cerabilia paniensis Will, 2020
- Cerabilia parva Will, 2020
- Cerabilia prolixa Will, 2020
- Cerabilia prosopogmoides Will, 2020
- Cerabilia reflexa Will, 2020
- Cerabilia rubrica Will, 2020
- Cerabilia rufipes (Broun, 1893)
- Cerabilia ruginosa Will, 2020
- Cerabilia securilata Will, 2020
- Cerabilia spinifer Will, 2020
- Cerabilia spuh Will, 2020
- Cerabilia sternovillosa Will, 2020
- Cerabilia storeyi Will, 2020
- Cerabilia striatula (Broun, 1893)
- Cerabilia stylata Will, 2020
- Cerabilia tipica Will, 2020
- Cerabilia uncata Will, 2020
- Cerabilia vitalis Will, 2020
- Cerabilia wisei Will, 2020
- Cerabilia wunduensis Will, 2020
