= Murik language =

Murik can be:

- Nor language (New Guinea)
- Murik Kayan language (Borneo)
