= Ramu–Lower Sepik languages =

Language family

Ramu–Lower Sepik
- (proposed)
- Geographic distribution: northern Papua New Guinea: East Sepik Province and Madang Province
- Linguistic classification: One of the world's primary language families
- Subdivisions: Lower Sepik (Nor–Pondo); Ramu; ? Grass

Language codes
- Glottolog: lowe1437

The Ramu–Lower Sepik a.k.a. Lower Sepik–Ramu languages are a proposed family of about 35 Papuan languages spoken in the Ramu and Sepik river basins of northern Papua New Guinea. These languages tend to have simple phonologies, with few consonants or vowels and usually no tones.

== Overview ==
Two primary branches are typically accepted:

- Lower Sepik (Nor–Pondo)
- Ramu

However, Foley (2018) also considers the possibility of Grass being a third primary branch. Usher classifies some of the Grass languages (the Keram languages) as being coordinate with Ramu, and some (the Porapora languages) as being part of Ramu.

The relatedness of the three branches are held together by morphological evidence, as very few lexical cognates are shared among them.

The family was proposed by William A. Foley and accepted by Malcolm Ross. Its two branches, Ramu and Lower Sepik, had belonged to Donald Laycock's now-defunct 1973 Sepik–Ramu proposal. If related, they are not close. The connection is not accepted by Timothy Usher.

Based on oral histories of the Lower Sepik peoples, which record that Yimas is spoken near their homeland, as well as the conservative nature of Yimas itself, Ross suggests that the speakers of Proto–Ramu – Lower Sepik may have lived in the northern foothills of the New Guinea highlands and moved into the Sepik Basin as the inland Sepik Sea started to recede six thousand years ago.

== Classification ==
The Ramu-Lower Sepik family is not accepted by Søren Wichmann (2013), who splits it into 4-5 separate groups.

Foley (2018) accepts that Ramu and Lower Sepik are related on the basis of morphological evidence, although they are typologically still very different from each other. It is also accepted by Glottolog.

Grass languages are lexically divergent, sharing very few cognates with the other Ramu languages. Foley (2018: 205) leaves open the possibility of Grass being a third branch of the Lower Sepik-Ramu family, with Lower Sepik and Ramu being sister branches.

== Typology ==
Although the Lower Sepik and Ramu groups are related, Ramu is morphologically much simpler than Lower Sepik due to differing historical contact scenarios. The Ndu, Yuat, and Ramu groups all have relatively simple morphology, while the Lower Sepik family has some of the most complex morphology seen among Papuan languages.

Foley posits that morphological simplification among these disparate languages families had occurred due to creolization through widespread language contact. He notes that the most spread-out languages with wide geographical distributions are also the ones with the simplest morphologies: Abau, Iwam, Kwanga, Ambulas, Boiken, Iatmul, Ap Ma, Mikarew, Adjora, and Rao (these are all Sepik and Ramu languages).

== Pronouns ==
The internal coherence of the two branches, Ramu and Lower Sepik, is based on similar pronoun paradigms, which however do not connect the two branches to each other. Foley was able to connect them lexically, but the primary evidence for a Ramu – Lower Sepik family is a number of irregular plural markers shared by the Lower Sepik languages and the Ramu languages Watam and Bosman. The pronouns themselves have little in common except for 3sg *man (proto-Ramu) ~ *mɨn (proto–Lower Sepik) and the non-singular affix *-ŋk- (dual in Ramu and paucal in Lower Sepik: See Ramu languages#Pronouns and Lower Sepik languages#Pronouns for details).

Whereas the Ramu languages have *ŋgo ‘1sg’ and *nu ‘2sg’, the Lower Sepik languages have *ama ‘1sg’ and *mi ‘2sg’.

	Ramu	Lower Sepik
1sg	*ŋgo	*ama
2sg	*nu	*mi

== Lexical comparison ==
Reconstructions of proto-Lower Sepik and proto-Ottilien (proto-Watam-Awar-Gamay, a Lower Ramu branch) from Foley (2005) are as follows. Uncertain reconstructions are marked by question marks following the forms.

gloss	proto-Lower Sepik	proto-Ottilien
one	*mb(w)ia-	*kaku
two	*ri-pa-	*mbuniŋ
person	*nor	*namot
fire	*awr	*s(u)ək
moon	*m(w)il ?	*kər(v)i
canoe	*kay	*kor
breast	*nɨŋgay	*mɨr
tooth	*sisiŋk ?	*nda(r)
bone	*sariŋamp	*ɣar
tongue	*minɨŋ	*mi(m)
eye	*tambri	*rəmeak
leg	*namuŋk	*or ?
ear	*kwand-	*kwar
leaf	*nɨmpramp	*(ra)par
oar	*(mɨ)naŋ	*anup
betelnut	*poruŋ	*mbok
lime	*awi(r)	*awi(r)
pig	*numpran	*rəkəm
snake	*wakɨn	*ndop
mosquito	*naŋgun	*ŋgit
feces	*mɨndi	*yu/o
hear	*and-	*varak
eat	*am(b)	*amb
go	*wa	*saŋg
come	*ya	*kɨp
sit	*sa	*mbirak

Lexical resemblances are few. The most likely lexical cognates are ‘tongue’, ‘ear’, ‘lime’, and ‘eat’.

gloss	proto-Lower Sepik	proto-Lower Ramu
tongue	*minɨŋ	*mi(m)
ear	*kwand-	*kwar
lime	*awi(r)	*awi(r)
eat	*am(b)	*am(b)

== See also ==
- Papuan languages
