= Mongol–Langam languages =

Ramu–Keram language group of Papua New Guinea

Mongol–Langam
- West Keram River; Ulmapo; Kaima, Koam
- Geographic distribution: East Sepik Province, Papua New Guinea
- Linguistic classification: Ramu–Keram: Keram; Mongol–Langam

Language codes
- Glottolog: mong1343

The Mongol–Langam, Koam, or Ulmapo languages are a language group of Keram Rural LLG, East Sepik Province, Papua New Guinea belonging to the Ramu language family. Foley (2018) includes them within the Grass languages, but they were not included in Foley (2005).

The Koam languages are spoken next to the Yuat languages, but two groups are unrelated.

== Names ==
The name Koam is used by Foley (2018), while the name Ulmapo (coined from the first two letters of each of the three daughter languages) is used by Barlow (2018) and Glottolog 4.0.

== Languages ==
According to Summer Institute of Linguistics data from 2003, the member languages had the following number of speakers:

- Mongol (Mwakai), 340 speakers
- Langam (Pondi), 420 speakers
- Yaul (Ulwa), 1,210 speakers

== Classification ==
Donald Laycock (1973) noted that the Mongol–Langam languages mark nouns for pluralisation, like the Lower Sepik languages (Nor–Pondo languages) and Yuat languages, and also that the lexicon also shows many resemblances to Yuat languages, while pronouns are similar to the Grass (Keram) languages (Ramu). Malcolm Ross (2005) accepts them as Ramu languages based on their pronouns. With additional data from recent research, Usher confirms their position in the Keram branch of the Ramu family.
