= Murik =

Murik may refer to:

- Morek, a town in Syria
- Murik Kayan language, spoken in Malaysia
- Nor language, spoken in Papua New Guinea
