= Anor language =

Ramu language spoken in Papua New Guinea

Anor
- Native to: Papua New Guinea
- Region: Madang Province
- Native speakers: (980 cited 2000)
- Language family: Ramu: Ramu proper; Annaberg; Aian; Anor

Language codes
- ISO 639-3: anj
- Glottolog: anor1241
- ELP: Anor

Anor, or Atemble, is a Ramu language of Papua New Guinea.
