= Pediomorphus =

Scientific classification
- Domain: Eukaryota
- Kingdom: Animalia
- Phylum: Arthropoda
- Class: Insecta
- Order: Coleoptera
- Suborder: Adephaga
- Family: Carabidae
- Subfamily: Pterostichinae
- Tribe: Abacetini
- Genus: Pediomorphus; Chaudoir, 1878

Genus of beetles

Pediomorphus is a genus of beetles in the family Carabidae first described by Maximilien Chaudoir in 1878.

== Species ==
Pediomorphus contains the following thirteen species:

- Pediomorphus crenulatus Will, 2019
- Pediomorphus elongatus Sloane, 1898
- Pediomorphus macleayi Sloane, 1900
- Pediomorphus maximus Will, 2019
- Pediomorphus minor Will, 2019
- Pediomorphus obtusus Will, 2019
- Pediomorphus planiusculus Chaudoir, 1878
- Pediomorphus punctatus Will, 2019
- Pediomorphus robustus Will, 2019
- Pediomorphus ruficollis Sloane, 1900
- Pediomorphus semilaevis Will, 2019
- Pediomorphus storeyi Will, 2019
- Pediomorphus variabilis (Straneo, 1960)
