= Abacetus ceylanoides =

Scientific classification
- Kingdom: Animalia
- Phylum: Arthropoda
- Clade: Pancrustacea
- Class: Insecta
- Order: Coleoptera
- Suborder: Adephaga
- Family: Carabidae
- Subfamily: Pterostichinae
- Tribe: Abacetini
- Genus: Abacetus
- Species: A. ceylanoides

Binomial name
- Abacetus ceylanoides Straneo, 1953

Synonyms
- Abacetus ceylandoides

Species of beetle

Abacetus ceylanoides is a species in the beetle family Carabidae. It is found in Indonesia.
