= Kayan language =

The Kayan language may be:

- the Padaung language of Burma
- any of the Kayan languages of Borneo
- the Kaian language of New Guinea
