= Andarum language =

Ramu language of Papua New Guinea

Andarum
- Native to: Papua New Guinea
- Region: Madang Province
- Native speakers: (2,100 cited 2000 census)
- Language family: Ramu: Ramu proper; Tamolan–Ataitan; Ataitan; Andarum

Language codes
- ISO 639-3: aod
- Glottolog: anda1284
- ELP: Andarum

Andarum is a Ramu language of Papua New Guinea. Together with closely related Kanggape, there were about 4,000 speakers in 2000.

According to an earlier classification, it belonged to the Ataitan languages (now renamed tanggu) and to the broader goam group, which also included 7 Tamolan languages, of which itutang (mzu) lost its status and was annexed to inapang [mzu] as its dialect.

It is related to the Kanggape language [igm]. Members of the ethnic group are called Andarum.
