= BRQ =

BRQ may refer to:

- Brno-Tuřany Airport (IATA airport code: BRQ), airport in Brno, Czech Republic
- Buraq Air (ICAO airline code: BRQ), airline based in Tripoli, Libya
- Breri language (ISO 639-3 language code: brq), a Ramu language of Papua New Guinea
- B-R-Q, a given name of Semitic origin frequently spelled as "Barack", "Barak" or "Baraq"
- Bus request, a control bus signal
