= Kopar =

Kopar may refer to:

- Kopar language, a language of Papua New Guinea
- Kopar railway station in Maharashtra, India
- Kopar, a city in Slovenia better known as Koper
