= Tanguat language =

Ramu language of Papua New Guinea

Tanguat
- Native to: Papua New Guinea
- Region: Madang Province
- Native speakers: 740 (2003)
- Language family: Ramu: Ramu proper; Tamolan–Ataitan; Ataitan; Tanguat

Language codes
- ISO 639-3: tbs
- Glottolog: tang1356
- ELP: Tanguat

Tanguat is a Ramu language of Papua New Guinea.
