= Botbot =

Botbot may refer to:

- Botbot, a barangay in the municipality of Hamtic, Antique province, Philippines
- Botbot, a barangay in the municipality of Pandan, Antique province, Philippines
- A dialect of Mbore language
- The robots in the animated series Transformers: BotBots
