= Bosmun language =

Ramu language spoken in Papua New Guinea

Bosman
- Bosngun
- Native to: Papua New Guinea
- Region: Madang Province (5 villages)
- Native speakers: 1,300 (2004)
- Language family: Ramu: Ramu proper; Lower Ramu; Ottilien; Bosman–Awar; Bosman

Language codes
- ISO 639-3: bqs
- Glottolog: bosn1248
- ELP: Bosmun
- Coordinates: 4.176323°S 144.648727°E

Bosman (Bosmun, Bosngun) is a Ramu language of Papua New Guinea. It is spoken five villages of Dongan ward, Yawar Rural LLG, Madang Province (4.176323°S 144.648727°E).

Like Watam, it shares a number of irregular plural markers with the Lower Sepik languages, supporting the proposal of a Ramu – Lower Sepik language family.
