= Awar language =

Ramu language spoken in Papua New Guinea

Awar
- Native to: Papua New Guinea
- Region: Yawar Rural LLG, Madang Province
- Native speakers: 900 (2013)
- Language family: Ramu: Ramu proper; Lower Ramu; Ottilien; Bosman–Awar; Awar
- Dialects: Awar; Nubia

Language codes
- ISO 639-3: aya
- Glottolog: awar1249
- ELP: Awar
- Coordinates: 4.142634°S 144.842242°E

Awar is a Ramu language spoken in three villages in Yawar Rural LLG, Madang Province, Papua New Guinea (4.142634°S 144.842242°E).
