= Rao language =

Ramu language spoken in Papua New Guinea

Rao
- Rao Breri
- Native to: Papua New Guinea
- Region: western Madang Province
- Native speakers: (6,000 cited 1992)
- Language family: Ramu: Ramu proper; Annaberg; Rao
- Dialects: Li’o; Ndramini’o

Language codes
- ISO 639-3: rao
- Glottolog: raoo1244
- ELP: Rao

Rao is a Ramu language of western Madang Province, Papua New Guinea. In older literature it was called Annaberg.

== Phonology ==
Consonants
	Labial	Alveolar	Palatal	Velar	Glottal
Plosive	p b	t d	tʃ dʒ	k g	ʔ
Prenasalized	ᵐb	ⁿd		ᵑg	
Fricative	f v	s z			(h)
Nasal	m	n		ŋ	
Approximant	w	r	j		

- /w/ is often heard as [β] word-initially and intervocalically.
- /f/ has only been found word-initially.
- /h/ is very rare and may be an allophone of /g/.
- /r/ can also be realised as [l].

Vowels
	Front	Central	Back
High	i	ɨ	u
Mid	e	ə	o
Low		a	

Additionally, the following diphthongs have been observed: /ia/, /ai/, /ea/.

Stress falls on the first syllable with a /ʔ/ in coda position. Otherwise, stress is fixed on the first syllable.
