= Yimas language =

Sepik language spoken in Papua New Guinea

Yimas
- Native to: Papua New Guinea
- Region: Yimas village, Karawari Rural LLG, East Sepik Province
- Native speakers: 50 (2016)
- Language family: Ramu–Lower Sepik: Lower Sepik (Nor–Pondo); Pondo?; Karawari–Yimas; Yimas

Language codes
- ISO 639-3: yee
- Glottolog: yima1243
- ELP: Yimas
- Yimas is classified as Severely Endangered by the UNESCO Atlas of the World's Languages in Danger.
- Coordinates: 4.680562°S 143.548847°E

Yimas Pidgin
- Native speakers: None
- Language family: Yimas-based pidgin

Language codes
- ISO 639-3: None (mis)
- Glottolog: yima1235 Yimas-Alamblak-Pidgin yima1244 Yimas-Arafundi-Pidginyima1246 Yimas-Iatmul Pidgin yima1245 Yimas-Karawari Pidgin

The Yimas language is spoken by the Yimas people, who populate the Sepik River Basin region of Papua New Guinea. It is spoken primarily in Yimas village (4.680562°S 143.548847°E), Karawari Rural LLG, East Sepik Province. It is a member of the Lower-Sepik language family. All 250-300 speakers of Yimas live in two villages along the lower reaches of the Arafundi River, which stems from a tributary of the Sepik River known as the Karawari River.

Yimas is a polysynthetic language with (somewhat) free word order, and is an ergative-absolutive language morphologically but not syntactically, although it has several other case-like relations encoded on its verbs. It has ten main noun classes (genders), and a unique number system. Four of the noun classes are semantically determined (male humans, female humans, higher animals, plants and plant material) whereas the rest are assigned on phonological bases.

It is an endangered language, being widely replaced by Tok Pisin, and to a lesser extent, English. It is unclear if any children are native Yimas speakers. However, a Yimas pidgin was once used as a contact language with speakers of Alamblak and Arafundi. Although it is still used in face-to-face conversation, it is considered a threatened language on the Ethnologue endangerment scale, with a rating of 6b.

== Phonology ==
Yimas has a total of 18 phonemes. Below are the vowel and consonant inventories, which are represented using International Phonetic Alphabet (IPA) symbols.

=== Consonants ===
The consonant phoneme inventory of Yimas is typical for the languages of Papua New Guinea. Like many languages of the region, Yimas has no fricative phonemes, although fricatives do sometimes appear in pronunciation as variants of plosives. The following table contains the 12 consonant phonemes of the language:

	Labial	Dental	Alveolar	Palatal	Velar
Stop	p	t		c	k
Nasal	m	n		ɲ	ŋ
Liquid			ɾ	ʎ	
Glide	w			j	

The phonemic status of the palatal consonants /c/, /ɲ/ and /ʎ/ is not entirely clear. In general their appearance is predictable; they arise primarily through palatalization of the alveolar consonants /t/, /n/, and /r/. However, there are a few words in which these consonants must be regarded as underlyingly palatal. Examples include akulɨm 'wrist', ɨɲcɨt 'urine', and other words, though these historically go back to alveolar consonants, as can be seen in their cognates in Karawari (awkurim 'wrist' and sɨndi 'urine').

Adjacent nasals and plosives are usually homorganic. Other combinations such as mt, mk, np, ŋt, etc., are rare or unattested; an example is pamki 'legs'. The same is true when plosives appear before nasals at the ends of words or syllables. In this case, the nasal is syllabic, for example watn [ˈwatn̩] (a hardwood tree species).

Plosives are generally voiced after nasals, with /p/ becoming voiced also before u. At word onsets and before stressed vowels, they are aspirated and voiceless. For example: ɲct [ˈɪɲɟɪt] 'urine', pamki [ˈpʰamgi] 'legs', tkay [tʰəˈkʰaɪ̯] 'nose', kput [kʰɞˈbut] 'rain'. /p/ and /w/ weaken to a voiceless fricative: ipwa [iˈβa]. When /k/ appears before two vowels, if the second vowel is unstressed, then the /k/ is realized as a voiced fricative: amanakn [ʌmʌˈnaɣɨn] 'mine'. Intervocally /c/ has age-based allophony, with older speakers preferring the stop realization and younger ones the dental sibilant [s], as in acak [ˈasʌk] 'to send'. After another consonant, /c/ is always realized as a palatal stop.

/ʎ/ is in free variation between [ʎ] and [lʲ]. r varies in pronunciation between [l] and [ɾ].

=== Vowels ===
The Yimas vowel inventory contains six phonemes in total, consisting of four monophthongs and two diphthongs:

Vowel Phonemes
	Front	Central	Back
Close	i	ɨ	u
Open		a	

The two diphthongs in Yimas are /aj/ and /aw/.

The most frequent vowels by far are /a/ and /ɨ/. ɨ also appears as an epenthetic vowel to break up otherwise illicit consonant clusters. In the vicinity of u and also occasionally in other contexts, an u is sometimes inserted instead: mml [məmɪʎ] 'a kind of snake', ŋmkŋn [ŋəmgəŋɨn] 'underneath', maŋkuml [maŋgɯmuʎ] 'two veins'. The appearance of /ɨ/ is often predictable from the surrounding consonant environment and as a result it can typically be treated as an epenthetic vowel even within lexical roots. Adopting this analysis results in whole words with no underlying vowels.

The vowel phonemes are involved in numerous phonological changes.

=== Syllable structure ===
The basic structure of the Yimas word (in terms of consonants C and vowels V) is the following:

#(C_{1})(C_{2})V_{1}([(C_{3})C_{4}(C_{5})]^{n})V_{2}(C_{6})(C_{7})#

Consonants are organized into three basic clusters in Yimas: the initial cluster [(C_{1})(C_{2})], the medial cluster [(C_{3})C_{4}(C_{5})] and the final cluster [(C_{6})(C_{7})]. Parentheses indicate that the consonant is optional. There are specific phonological constraints placed on the cluster depending on where it is located in the word. In other words, only certain consonant phonemes can begin a word, end a word, or appear in the middle of a word. The iterative variable n allows the medial consonant cluster to be repeated many times.

A Yimas word can consist of only a single vowel. An example is the verb stem /i-/, which means 'say'. Some of the longest roots are five or six syllables, like /mamantakarman/, which means 'land crab'.

Yimas has predictable rules with regard to syllabification. In the middle of a word, if a consonant is between two vowels, the syllable boundary precedes the consonant: (V.CV).

If two consonants are between two vowels, the syllable boundary falls between the consonants: (VC_{1}.C_{2}V).

However, if C_{1} is a stop and C_{2} is /r/, the syllable boundary precedes C_{1}: (V.C_{1}C_{2}V).

Whenever three consonants are between two vowels, the syllable boundary comes after the first consonant: (VC_{1}.C_{2}C_{3}V).

=== Stress ===
In Yimas, the primary accent lies in general on the first syllable of a word. In words with more than three syllables, the third syllable carries secondary stress. Below are some examples (where ´ represents primary stress, and ` represents secondary stress):

kwálcan
'arise'

námarawt
'person'

wánkanàwi
'insect'

If the first syllable contains an epenthetic vowel but the second does not, then the second syllable is stressed. When the first as well as the second syllable contain epenthetic vowels, then the stress lies on the first syllable.

Below are more examples, including words with stress on epenthetic vowels:

Word	Pronunciation	Translation	Notes
ŋárwa	[ˈŋaɾwʌ]	penis	
kcakk	[kʰɪˈsaɣək]	to cut	first syllable has an epenthetic vowel → second syllable stressed
mɲŋ	[ˈmɪɲɪŋ]	tongue	first two syllables have epenthetic vowels → first syllable stressed
yámparan	[ˈjambʌɾʌn]	to stand up	
málcawkwa	[ˈmaʎcɔkwʌ]	lower back	
yácɨrɨm	[ˈjɛsəɾəm]	an accessory for chewing betelnuts	
yáwkawpùnumprum	[ˈjawkʌwˌpʰunɯmbɾɯm]	yellow opossum	Secondary stress on the third syllable

The genitive suffix -na, which is used on personal pronouns, takes primary stress: ama-na-kn [ʌmʌˈnaɣɨn] 'mine'.

Stress is never the distinguishing factor between two words; i.e., two words cannot differ in meaning if they only differ in which syllable carries stress (as opposed to English, which distinguishes between the noun 'désert' and the verb 'desért').

== Nouns and noun morphology ==
=== Noun classes ===
There are ten basic noun classes in Yimas, and about six additional minor classes with only a few nouns in each one. Noun classes are either categorized by their semantic similarity or their phonological similarity. Of the ten major noun classes, four are identified based on semantic properties, and six are identified based on phonological properties.

The ten major noun classes are distinguished by the following properties:

Noun Classes I-X
Class	Semantic/Phonological Property	Example
I	male humans and humans of ambiguous sex	apwi 'father'
II	female humans	kaywi 'sister'
III	higher animals, like pigs, dogs, and crocodiles	numpran 'pig'
IV	plants and trees	irpm 'coconut palm'
V	noun ends in /p, k, m, n, ŋ, nt, r, l/ (or /i, y/ if not in class VIII)	muntuk 'neck'
VI	noun ends in /ŋk/ (or /ŋ/ if in word-final position)	yarmuraŋ 'black eel'
VII	noun ends in /mp/ (or /m/ if in word-final position)	karm 'lip, language'
VIII	noun ends in /i, y/	mayŋi 'beetle'
IX	noun ends in /aw/	yaw 'road'
X	noun ends in a rounded vowel plus /k, ŋk/ (closely related to class VI)	awruk 'bandicoot'

Although some classes are similar in category, no two classes overlap; i.e., no noun is associated with more than one noun class. So there may be words that fall into the semantic categories specified by class I-IV that have the same phonetic properties as words in one of the later classes, but will only be placed in one class. By far, class V is the largest noun class, with nearly half of all Yimas words assigned to this class. Many of the nouns formerly in class VIII have become members of class V as the language has evolved. Additionally, the rounded vowel that terminates nouns in class X have a distinctive autosegmental rounding feature.

Nouns within a class share sets of agreement affixes with adjectives, pronouns, and verbs. The adjectival, pronominal, and verbal agreement affixes are appended to adjectives, pronouns, and verbs respectively, depending on the number and noun class of the noun they are associated with. The adjective must have an affix that agrees with the noun the adjective describes, and pronouns are made possessive by appending affixes that agree with the noun of the possessor as well. Agreement affixes for verbs are used to indicate that a noun is its subject if the verb is intransitive, or that a noun is its object if the verb is transitive. As an example, the following table contains the set of agreement affixes for class I nouns:

Class I Agreement Affixes
	Singular	Dual	Plural
Adjectival	-n	-mampan	-ump
Possessive	-kn	-rm	-ump
Verbal	na-	impa-	pu-

Below is an example of the class I singular adjectival agreement suffix /-n/ applied to the adjective meaning 'good'. Here, the suffix is used to show that the adjective is describing a class I, singular noun:

kalakn yua-n
child.I.SG good.I.SG
'a good child'

In general, appending the possessive marker /-na/ to a pronoun, along with the appropriate possessive agreement affix, creates a possessive pronoun in Yimas. The following is an example of how a class I singular possessive pronoun is formed; /ama/ is the bound first person singular pronoun, and /-kn/ is the class I possessive agreement suffix:

apwi ama-na-kn
father.I.SG 1SG-POSS-I.SG
'my father'

Affixation on verbs for noun agreement are discussed in detail in the verbal morphology section.

=== Pronouns ===
Yimas independent pronouns are:

	sg	du	pc	pl
1	ama	kapa	paŋkət	ipa
2	mi	kapwa	paŋkət	ipwa
3	mən	mərəm	məŋgət	mum

=== Oblique suffix ===
The oblique suffix (/-n/ or /-nan/) is the only case marker present in Yimas, and "indicates locations, times, or instruments." Generally, the suffix /-n/ is used with singular nouns, and the suffix /-nan/ is used with plural and dual nouns, although there are some irregularities. Below are a few inflectional uses of the suffix, which serve to provide a semantic meaning similar to prepositions in English:

nam-n
house-OBL
'in the house'

wanwa-n
knife-OBL
'with a knife'

tktntrm-nan
chair.V.DL-OBL
'with two chairs'

=== Noun compounding ===
Nouns may compound with a verb or another noun phrase. The head is always a noun, and this head noun determines the number and noun class of the final compounded noun. Compounds consisting of two root nouns are the most frequently used type of compounded noun.

The most common way of forming a compound with two root nouns is by appending the oblique suffix /-n/ to the non-head noun, which precedes the head noun:

puratuŋk-n tampan
bile.VI.SG-OBL liver.V.SG
'gall bladder'

=== Suppletion ===
Instead of using affixation to distinguish number for a noun, Yimas uses suppletion for many common nouns; in other words, the singular and plural forms have different roots for these common nouns.

	Singular	Plural
'woman'	narmaŋ	ŋaykum
'man'	panmal	payum
'child'	kalakn	kumpwi

The dual form in Yimas is derived from the singular form, and does not follow the same morphological process of suppletion.

== Verbal morphology ==
Yimas is a polysynthetic language with a complex verbal morphology. The most significant form of Yimas morphology is affixation, with other morphological processes only serving a secondary role in the language.

=== Pronominal prefixes ===
Pronominal affixes on verbs take the place of case markings and word order in other languages. The list of all pronominal prefixes in Yimas, arranged by person, number, and A/O/S function, are below. The first and second person pronouns are included to show the similarity with the S forms. There are no true pronouns for third person since the function is filled by deictics, so these spaces appear empty below. "A" indicates the subject of a transitive verb, "O" indicates the object of a transitive verb, and "S" indicates the subject of an intransitive verb:

Pronominal Prefixes
	A	O	S	Pronoun
1DL	ŋkra-	ŋkra-	kapa-	kapa
1PL	kay-	kra-	ipa-	ipa
1SG	ka-	ŋa-	ama-	ama
2DL	ŋkran-	ŋkul-	kapwa-	kapwa
2PL	nan-	kul-	ipwa-	ipwa
2SG	n-	nan-	ma-	mi
3SG	n-	na-	na-	
3PL	mpu-	pu-	pu-	
3DL	mpɨ-	impa-	impa-	

==== Ergative-absolutive schema ====
A notable feature of these pronominal prefixes is that all third person pronominal prefixes follow an ergative-absolutive case pattern: the pronominal prefix for the subject of an intransitive verb (marked S) matches the prefix for the object of a transitive verb (marked O), and contrasts with the prefix for the subject of a transitive verb (marked A).

=== Noun class distinctions ===
Nouns' agreement affixes with verbs are often useful for disambiguating the subject and object of a sentence. Consider the following example, where class distinctions specify the prefixes that are appended to the verb:

krayŋ narmaŋ k-n-tay
frog.VI.SG woman.II.SG VI.SG.O-3SG.A-see
'The woman saw the frog.'

Here, the prefix /k-/ indicates that the object of the verb is a class VI singular noun, and the prefix /n-/ indicates that the subject of the verb is a third-person singular noun. Since 'woman' in Yimas is a class II noun, while 'frog' is a class VI noun, it must be the frog that is the object of the verb 'see', while 'woman' must be the subject.

=== Dative suffixes and ditransitive verbs ===
Yimas has four ditransitive verbs: /ŋa-/ ('give'), /i-/ ('tell someone'), /tkam-/ ('show'), and /pul-/ ('rub on'). Unlike other verbs, ditransitive verbs allow three pronominal affixes to be appended to them, in order to identify the indirect object or dative case. The dative affixes for first and second person are the same as the first and second person O affixes, but for third person, there is a unique set of dative suffixes.

Consider the example below:

uraŋ k-mpu-ŋa-tkam-t
coconut.VI.SG VI.SG.O-3PL.A-1SG.D-show-PERF
'They showed me the coconut.'

uraŋ k-mpu-tkam-r-mpn
coconut.VI.SG VI.SG.O-3PL.A-show-PERF-3DL.D
'They showed them two the coconut.'

Notice that the first person singular dative prefix /ŋa-/ is identical to the first person singular O prefix, whereas the third person dual dative suffix /-mpn/ is unique.

=== Tense, aspect, and mood ===
The only verbal affix that is required in Yimas is that which indicates tense. Yimas has an elaborate tense-marking system, as illustrated below for the verb wa- 'go'.

wa-ntut	go-RM.PST	'went more than a few days ago'
wa-kiantut	go-FR.PST	'went a few days ago'
wa-nan	go-NR.PST	'went yesterday'
wa-t	go-IMM.PST	'went today'
wa-n	go-PRS	'going now'
wa-wat	go-HAB	'usually go'
wa-kiak	go-NR.FUT	'will go tomorrow'
wa-kt	go-RM.FUT	'will go after tomorrow'

The tense suffix follows the verb root and precedes the dative suffix (if the dative suffix is applied to the verb). In the following example, the suffix /-ntuk/ indicates that the action takes place in the remote past, and is followed by the dative suffix /-mpun/:

patn na-kay-ŋa-ntuk-mpun
betelnut.V.SG V.SG.T-1PL.A-give-RMPAST-3PL.D
'We gave betelnut to them long ago.'

==== Irrealis mood ====
There is a significant distinction between realis and irrealis events in Yimas, which accounts for the main variation in tense suffixes. In particular, the irrealis suffix /-k/ indicates "events which are located outside of the continuum of real time: they must be completely timeless, in the legendary past or in the indefinite future."

The irrealis suffix is especially common in Yimas legends. Consider the sentence taken from a Yimas text:

tan impa-ampu-mpi-awl-k
there 3DL.S-float-SEQ-take-IRR
'They both drifted there.'

==== Tenses for real events ====
Yimas has eight tenses for real events, which are distinguished by affixes.

There are three past tenses: the near past, which is used to describe events that occurred approximately the day before; the remote past, which extends from the legendary past up to three or four days ago; and the far past, which describes events somewhere between the near and the remote past. The near past suffix is /-nan/ in its most basic form. The basic remote past suffixes are /-ntuk/ and /-ntut/. The far past uses the remote past suffix compounded with an additional suffix /-kia/ (so its suffix is /-kiantuk/ or /-kiantut/).

The three present tenses are distinguished by aspectual differences, i.e., the level of completion of an action: the present perfective describes completed events; the present imperfective describes ongoing events; and the present habitual describes events that occur regularly, as a scheduled part of people's day. The most basic form of the present perfective suffix is /-r/, although there exists much allomorphic variation. The present imperfective is indicated by the definitive prefix /na-/ and the suffix /-nt/ in its most basic form. The basic form of the present habitual is created using the suffix /-war/.

The two future tenses, the near future and the remote future, distinguish between events that occur tomorrow from events that occur farther in the future. The near future suffix is /-kia/, and is either accompanied by the irrealis suffix /-k/ in word final position, or the present suffix /-nt/ if other suffixes follow it. These suffixes must also appear in combination with the definitive prefix /na-/ or the modal prefix /ka-/. The basic suffix for the remote future is /-kr/.

=== Reduplication ===
Yimas uses partial or full reduplication to convey the repetition of an action. In the following example, the root morpheme /ark-/ is the verb meaning 'break', and it is fully reduplicated in order to signify repetition:

ya-n-arkark-wampaki-pra-k
V.PL.O-3SG.A-break(RED./ark-/)-throw-toward-IRR
'He repeatedly broke them and threw them as he came.'

Below is an example of partial reduplication of the root morpheme /api-/, which means 'put in':

arm m-um ima-mpu-nan-nanaŋ-apapi-ŋa-ntut
water NR.DIST-I.PL water.O-3PL.A-2SG.D-DUR-put(RED./api-/)-BEN-RMPAST
'They were repeatedly gathering water for you all.'

=== Serialization ===
The extensive use of serial verb constructions is another factor that contributes to the verbal morphology of Yimas. There are two types of serial verbs in Yimas. The first type of serial verb is constructed by simple compounding, and conveys the meaning that the two events indicated by the verbs occur concurrently or are causally related. The second type of serial verbs are those that are connected by an intermediary morpheme, and convey the meaning that the two verbs may occur sequentially, but are not strongly causally related. This intermediary morpheme is usually the suffix /-mpi/, which attaches to the first verb, and links sequences of events.

Below is an example of the first serial verb type, where the morphemes /kulanaŋ/ 'walk' and /kanta/ 'follow' are juxtaposed to convey that the actions are occurring simultaneously:

impa-n-yakal-kulanaŋ-kanta-k
3DL.O-3SG.A-CONT-walk-follow-IRR
'He was walking following those two.'

Below is an example of the second type of serial verb, which utilizes the sequential suffix /-mpi/ to show that the verbs /ak/ 'push' and /wul/ 'put down' occur in succession:

arm-n kay i-ka-ak-mpi-wul
water-OBL canoe.VIII.SG VIII.SG.O-1SG.A-push-SEQ-put_down
'I pushed the canoe down into the water.'

== Syntax ==
=== Word order ===
Yimas has very free word order. Since the majority of Yimas clauses consists of just a verb, there are no established word order patterns at all. Consider the following intransitive sentence, which consists of just a verb:

paŋkra-[kaykaykay-kwalca-mpi-kulanaŋ-tal]-kia-ntu-ŋkt
1PC.S-quickly-rise-SEQ-walk-start-NIGHT-RMPAST-PC
'We few got up and quickly started to walk'

Noun phrases do not need to form a constituent on the surface, so nouns can be separated from their modifiers (though the modifiers must then have affixes that identify the noun class of the noun they modify).

Below are some different word orders present in Yimas:

SOV:

payum narmaŋ na-mpu-tay
man.I.PL woman.II.SG 3SG.O-3PL.A-see
'The men saw the woman.'

OSV:

payum narmaŋ pu-n-tay
man.I.PL woman.II.SG 3PL.O-3SG.A-see
'The woman saw the men.'

Note that the above sentences only differ in the pronominal prefixes appended to the verb /-tay/ 'see'. These pronominal prefixes identify which noun is the subject of the sentence and which noun is the object. So, using different prefixes on a verb can alter which words are the subject and object, without actually changing the placement of nouns in the sentence. Generally, it is the pronominal affix system for verbs that allows Yimas to have free word order, as expressed in the above examples.

Yimas also allows SVO word order:

ŋaykum i-mpu-tar-kamta-k-i-cal-cɨ-t anti
woman.II.SG VIII.SG.O-3PL.A-CAUS-clear-IRR-VIII.SG-CAUS-become-PERF ground.VIII.SG
'The women cleared the ground.'

=== Fixed word orders ===
Although word order in Yimas is extremely free, a few constituents have more rigid word order in many cases:

Noun Phrase	Postposition
makaw mawnta fish.IX.SG fish.V.SG	kantk with
'with makaw and catfish'

Clause	Yes/No Question Particle
namat uraŋ k-mpu-nan-tkam-t man.I.PL coconut.VI.SG VI.SG.T-3PL.A-2SG.D-show-PERF	a Q
'Did the men show you a coconut?'

Possessor	Possessee
tuŋkntuma na-kn possum.III.SG POSS-V.SG	marm smell.V.SG
'smell of a possum'
