= Gorovu language =

Ramu language of Papua New Guinea

Gorovu
- Native to: Papua New Guinea
- Region: East Sepik Province
- Native speakers: 20 (2007)
- Language family: Ramu: Grass; Porapora; Gorovu

Language codes
- ISO 639-3: grq
- Glottolog: goro1261
- ELP: Gorovu
- Coordinates: 4.548038°S 144.586168°E

Gorovu is a nearly extinct Ramu language of Papua New Guinea.

It is spoken in the two villages of:

- Bangapela village, Bang Wokam ward, Yawar Rural LLG, Bogia District, Madang Province (4.548038°S 144.586168°E)
- Iabu Rural LLG, Bogia District, Madang Province
