= Aiome language =

Ramu language of Papua New Guinea

Aiome
- Native to: Papua New Guinea
- Region: Madang Province
- Native speakers: (1,800 cited 2000)
- Language family: Ramu: Ramu proper; Annaberg; Aian; Aiome

Language codes
- ISO 639-3: aki
- Glottolog: aiom1240
- ELP: Aiome

Aiome (Ayom) is a Ramu language of Papua New Guinea.
