= Inapang language =

Ramu language of Papua New Guinea

Inapang
- Native to: Papua New Guinea
- Region: East Sepik Province, Madang Province
- Native speakers: 4,000 (2016)
- Language family: Ramu: Ramu proper; Tamolan–Ataitan; Tamolan; Inapang
- Dialects: Midsivindi; Itutang; Yigavesakama

Language codes
- ISO 639-3: mzu
- Glottolog: inap1241
- ELP: Inapang

Inapang is a Ramu language of Papua New Guinea. Dialects are Midsivindi, Itutang and Yigavesakama.
