= Marangis language =

Language in the Ramu family

Marangis
- Watam
- Native to: Papua New Guinea
- Region: Madang Province, East Sepik Province
- Native speakers: 590 (2003)
- Language family: Ramu: Ramu proper; Lower Ramu; Ottilien; Watam; Marangis

Language codes
- ISO 639-3: wax
- Glottolog: wata1253
- ELP: Watam

Marangis a.k.a. Watam is a Ramu language of Papua New Guinea. Like Bosmun, it shares a number of irregular plural markers with the Lower Sepik languages, supporting the proposal of a Ramu – Lower Sepik language family.

It is spoken in the two villages of:

- Watam village, Marienberg Rural LLG, East Sepik Province (3.906592°S 144.545246°E)
- Marangis village, Yawar Rural LLG, Madang Province (4.014075°S 144.605629°E)

== Pronouns ==
The pronominal system of Watam has a four-way distinction, with there being a paucal ("a few", "more than two") number for pronouns in addition to singular, dual, and plural.

person	singular	dual	paucal	plural
1st	yak	aŋga	apak	ae
2nd	u	noŋgo	niŋga	ne
3rd	ma	miŋga	miŋga	min

== Nouns ==
Nominal plural formatives include:

gloss	singular	plural
‘ear’	kwar	kwair
‘elbow’	tutup	tutpemb
‘buttocks’	tok	toke
‘leg’	or	orar
‘man’	namot	namtar
‘girl’	namoŋ	navgor
‘nose’	ŋgum	gubeb
‘bandicoot’	maŋem	maŋbar
‘sago’	wak	wik
‘betelnut’	meɲjak	miɲjik

== Verbs ==
Watam verbal conjugation for the verb ndo ‘to see’:

tense	verbal form
present	ndo-ta
present	ndo-ri
future	ndo-na(n)
imperative	ndo
