= Kire language =

Ramu language spoken in Papua New Guinea

Kire
- Giri
- Native to: Papua New Guinea
- Region: Madang Province
- Native speakers: 2,400 (2003)
- Language family: Ramu: Ramu proper; Lower Ramu; Misegian; Kire

Language codes
- ISO 639-3: geb
- Glottolog: kire1240
- ELP: Kire
- Coordinates: 4.286778°S 144.724753°E

Kire (Giri) is a Ramu language of Giri village (4.286778°S 144.724753°E) in Yawar Rural LLG, Madang Province, Papua New Guinea.

== Phonology ==
Out of all the Ramu languages, Kire has the most complex consonant phonemic inventory.

Consonants
	Labial	Alveolar	Dorsal
Plosive	p b	t d	k g
Aspirated	pʰ	tʰ	kʰ
Prenasalized	ᵐp ᵐb	ⁿt ⁿd	ᵑk ᵑg
Fricative	β, f v	s̪, s z	h
Nasal	m	n	ŋ
Approximant	w	r	

- Aspirated plosives only occur word-initially.
- /w/ has only been found word-initially.

Vowels
	Short			Long		
	Front	Central	Back	Front	Central	Back
High	i ĩ	ɨ ɨ̃	u ũ	iː ĩː	ɨː ɨ̃ː	uː
Mid	e ẽ		o õ	eː ẽː		õː
Low		a ã			aː ãː	

Additionally, the following diphthongs and triphthongs are found: /ia/, /ĩã/, /ei/, /ẽĩ/, /ai/, /aːi/, /oi/, /ui/, /uiː/, /ũĩ/, /ue/, /ũẽː/, /ua/, /ũã/, /ũãː/, /uei/, /uai/, /ũãĩ/, /ũĩã/, /ũẽĩ/.

== Orthography ==
Kire orthography:

Kire alphabet
Phonemes	ɑ	ɑ̃	b	β	d	e	ẽ	f	g	h	i	ĩ	ɨ	ɨ̃	k	kʰ	m	ᵐb	ᵐp	n
Lowercase letters	a	ä	b	ƀ	d	e	ë	f	g	h	i	ï	ɨ	ɨ̈	k	kh	m	mb	mp	n
Phonemes	ⁿd	ⁿt	ŋ	ᵑg	ᵑk	o	õ	p	pʰ	r	s	s̪	t	tʰ	u	ũ	v	w	z	
Lowercase letters	nd	nt	ŋ	ŋg	ŋk	o	ö	p	ph	r	s	š	t	th	u	ü	v	w	z	
