= Misegian languages =

Language family

Misegian
- Mikarew; Ruboni Range
- Geographic distribution: Ruboni Range, Yawar Rural LLG, Madang Province, Papua New Guinea
- Linguistic classification: Ramu: Ramu proper; Lower Ramu; Misegian

Language codes
- Glottolog: kire1239

The Misegian, also known as Mikarew or Ruboni Range languages, are a small family of clearly related languages,

Giri, Sepen, and Mikarew (Aruamu).

They are generally classified among the Ramu languages of northern Papua New Guinea. The Misegian languages are all spoken in Yawar Rural LLG, Madang Province, Papua New Guinea.

== Phonemes ==
Usher (2020) reconstructs the consonant inventory as follows:

*m	*n		*ŋ
*pʰ	*tʰ		*kʰ
*p	*t		*k
*b	*d		*g
*ɸ	*s		
*w	*ɾ	*j	*ɣ

*i	*ʉ	*u
*ɛ		*ɔ
	*a	

== Pronouns ==
Usher reconstructs the pronouns as:

	sg	du	pl
1	*[k/g][ɔ/u], naŋ	*[ŋ]ka	*aia
2	*n[ɔ/u]	*[ŋ]kɔa	*nɛ
3	*a(-na)	*mani	*mɛ

As of 2020, these are tagged for revision.
