= Pediomorphus macleayi =

Scientific classification
- Kingdom: Animalia
- Phylum: Arthropoda
- Class: Insecta
- Order: Coleoptera
- Suborder: Adephaga
- Family: Carabidae
- Genus: Pediomorphus
- Species: P. macleayi

Binomial name
- Pediomorphus macleayi Sloane, 1900

Species of beetle

Pediomorphus macleayi is a species of beetle in the family Carabidae.
