= Don Kulick =

Professor of anthropology (born 1960)

- Born: 5 September 1960 (age 66)

Academic background
- Education: Stockholm University

Academic work
- Main interests: cultural and linguistic anthropology
- Notable works: Travesti: sex, gender, and culture among Brazilian transgendered prostitutes

Don Kulick (born 5 September 1960) is an American anthropologist and linguist. He is a professor in anthropology at the University of Hong Kong. Kulick works within the frameworks of both cultural and linguistic anthropology, and has carried out field work in Papua New Guinea, Brazil, Italy and Sweden. Kulick is also known for his extensive fieldwork on the Tayap people and their language in Gapun village of East Sepik Province, Papua New Guinea.

== Biography ==
Don Kulick was born on 5 September 1960 in the United States. He moved to Sweden at the age of 19 to study at Lund University.

== Education and career ==
Kulick received his B.A. in Anthropology and Linguistics from Lund University in Sweden in 1983 and his Ph.D. in Anthropology from Stockholm University in 1990. Kulick's previous academic positions were at both Stockholm and Linköping Universities. He was previously a professor of Anthropology and Director of the Center for the Study of Gender and Sexuality at New York University, before becoming a professor of Anthropology and Chair of the Department of Comparative Human Development at the University of Chicago. As of 2015, Kulick is a professor of Anthropology and leads the research program "New Perspectives on Vulnerability" at Uppsala University.

In the late 1990s, Kulick researched Travesti communities in Brazil and published his findings in multiple works, including The Gender of Brazilian Transgendered Prostitutes. Kulick notably included photographs in his study, as a visual aid to show common body modifications of Travesti. As well, many of the methods and theories that came from this study have been influential in other studies and discussions of sexual and gender identities within Latin American LGBTQ communities.

Kulick is known for his linguistic work, such as his study of the Tayap people of Papua New Guinea. This research included documenting the generational language shift from Tayap to Tok Pisin, as well as how gender and emotion interact with language in the context of the villagers of Gapun.

He has been considered one of Sweden's foremost queer theorists and was influential in introducing queer theory to Sweden.

== Selected publications ==
=== Books ===
- Kulick, Don (1992). Language shift and cultural reproduction: socialization, self, and syncretism in a Papua New Guinean village. Cambridge England New York: Cambridge University Press. ISBN 9780521414845.
- Kulick, Don; Willson, Margaret (1995). Taboo: sex, identity, and erotic subjectivity in anthropological fieldwork. London New York: Routledge. ISBN 9780415088190.
- Kulick, Don; Cameron, Deborah (2003). Language and sexuality. Cambridge: Cambridge University Press. ISBN 9780511791178.
- Kulick, Don (1998). Travesti: sex, gender, and culture among Brazilian transgendered prostitutes. Chicago: University of Chicago Press. ISBN 9780226461007.
- Kulick, Don; Meneley, Anne (2005). Fat: the anthropology of an obsession. New York: Jeremy P. Tarcher/Penguin. ISBN 9781585423866.
- Kulick, Don (2005). Queersverige [Queer Sweden]. Stockholm: Natur & Kultur. ISBN 9789127110199.
- Kulick, Don; Cameron, Deborah (2006). The language and sexuality reader. London New York: Routledge. ISBN 9780203013373.
- Kulick, Don; Rydström, Jens (2015). Loneliness and its opposite: sex, disability, and the ethics of engagement. Durham, North Carolina: Duke University Press. ISBN 9780822375845.
- Kulick, Don (2019). A Death in the Rainforest: How a Language and a Way of Life Came to an End in Papua New Guinea. Chapel Hill, North Carolina: Algonquin Books. ISBN 9781616209049.

=== Chapters in books ===
- Kulick, Don; Stroud, Christopher (1993), "Conceptions and uses of literacy in a Papua New Guinean village", in Street, Brian V. (ed.), Cross-cultural approaches to literacy, Cambridge England New York, New York, USA: Cambridge University Press, pp. 30–63, ISBN 9780521409643.
- Kulick, Don (2010), "Humorless lesbians", in Holmes, Janet; Marra, Meredith (eds.), Femininity, feminism and gendered discourse a selected and edited collection of papers from the fifth International Language and Gender Association Conference, IGALA5, Newcastle upon Tyne: Cambridge Scholars, pp. 59–82, ISBN 9781443823647.

=== Journal articles ===
- Kulick, Don; Stroud, Christopher (June 1990). "Christianity, cargo and ideas of self: patterns of literacy in a Papua New Guinean Village". Man. 25 (2): 286–304. doi:10.2307/2804565. JSTOR 2804565. Pdf.
- Kulick, Don (September 1997). "The gender of Brazilian transgendered prostitutes". American Anthropologist. 99 (3): 574–585. doi:10.1525/aa.1997.99.3.574. Pdf.
- Kulick, Don (October 2000). "Gay and lesbian language". Annual Review of Anthropology. 29 (1): 243–285. doi:10.1146/annurev.anthro.29.1.243. Pdf.
- Kulick, Don (April 2003). "No". Language & Communication. 23 (2): 139–151. doi:10.1016/S0271-5309(02)00043-5. Pdf.
- Kulick, Don (December 2008). "Gender politics". Men and Masculinities. 11 (2): 186–192. doi:10.1177/1097184X08315098. S2CID 220318745. Pdf.
