= Angoram language =

Papuan language spoken in Papua New Guinea

Angoram
- Pondo
- Kanda
- Native to: Papua New Guinea
- Region: East Sepik Province
- Native speakers: 8,200 (2003)
- Language family: Ramu–Lower Sepik: Lower Sepik (Nor–Pondo); Pondo?; Angoram

Language codes
- ISO 639-3: aog
- Glottolog: ango1255
- ELP: Angoram

Angoram, also known as Pondo and by its speakers as Kanda, is a Papuan language of Papua New Guinea.

Maramba, listed in Ethnologue, has been found by Foley (2018: 226) to in fact be a dialect of Angoram that is spoken in Maramba village.
