= Middle Ramu languages =

Language family

Middle Ramu
- Annaberg; South Ramu River
- Geographic distribution: Middle Ramu District, Madang Province, Papua New Guinea
- Linguistic classification: Ramu: Ramu proper; Middle Ramu
- Subdivisions: Rao; Aian: Anor, Aiome

Language codes
- Glottolog: anna1245

The Middle Ramu or Annaberg languages are a small language family of Madang Province, Papua New Guinea. It is no longer accepted as a valid grouping by Glottolog, but is accepted by Foley (2018).

Wurm (1982) classified Aian, at his 'family' level, in a more distant stock-level relationship with Rao (Annaberg):

- Annaberg
  - Rao (Annaberg)
  - Aian family: Anor, Aiome

The Annaberg family is generally classified among the Ramu languages of northern Papua New Guinea.
