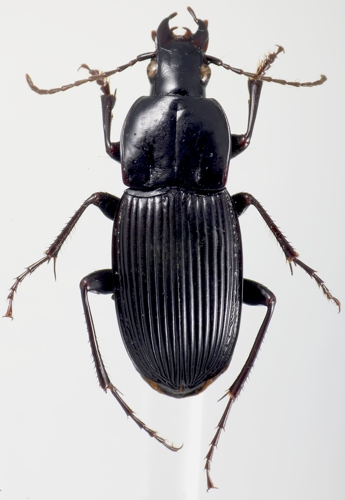
- Zeodera atra

Scientific classification
- Domain: Eukaryota
- Kingdom: Animalia
- Phylum: Arthropoda
- Class: Insecta
- Order: Coleoptera
- Suborder: Adephaga
- Family: Carabidae
- Subfamily: Pterostichinae
- Tribe: Abacetini
- Genus: Zeodera; Laporte, 1867

Subgenera
- Haploferonia Darlington, 1962; Homalonesiota Maindron, 1908; Nebrioferonia Straneo, 1939; Zeodera Laporte, 1867

= Zeodera =

Genus of beetles

Zeodera is a genus of ground beetles in the family Carabidae, first described by François-Louis Laporte in 1867. There are about six described species in Zeodera.

More than 15 species were recently transferred from Zeodera to the genus Oxycrepis, subgenus (Loxandrus).

== Species ==
These six species belong to the genus Zeodera:

- Zeodera atra Laporte, 1867 (Australia)
- Zeodera intermedia (Allen, 1982) (New Guinea)
- Zeodera karawarii (Maindron, 1908) (Indonesia and New Guinea)
- Zeodera simplex (Darlington, 1962) (Indonesia and New Guinea)
- Zeodera straneoi (Darlington, 1962) (Indonesia and New Guinea)
- Zeodera strigitarsis (Straneo, 1939) (Indonesia and New Guinea)
