= Porapora languages =

Members of the Ramu language family

Porapora River
- core Grass; Porapora River
- Geographic distribution: East Sepik Province and Madang Province, Papua New Guinea
- Linguistic classification: Ramu: Ramu proper; Tamolan–Ataitan; Porapora River
- Subdivisions: Gorovu; Adjora

Language codes
- Glottolog: agoa1234

The Porapora languages (alternatively the core Grass or Porapora River languages) are a pair of closely related languages in the Ramu language family, Gorovu and Adjora (Abu), spoken along the border of East Sepik Province and Madang Province in Papua New Guinea. Foley classifies them as part of the Grass group of languages, but Usher break up the Grass languages. Foley (2018) included Aion (Ambakich) as well, but it has since been shown to be one of the Keram languages.

== Phonemes ==
Usher (2020) reconstructs the consonant inventory as follows:

*m	*n		*ŋ
*p	*t	*s	*k
*mb	*nd	[*ndz]	*ŋg
*w	*ɾ	*j	*ɣ

Vowels are *i *ʉ *u *a.

== Pronouns ==
Usher (2020) reconstructs the pronouns as:

	singular	dual	plural
1st person	*[ŋg]u	*aŋgʉ	*ani
2nd person	*ŋu	*uŋgʉ	*uni
3rd person	*mV	?	*mV-nʉ

Adjora has 1SG na, but that derives from an oblique form.
