= Adjora language =

Ramu language of Papua New Guinea

Adjora
- Adjoria, Azao
- Abu
- Native to: Papua New Guinea
- Region: East Sepik Province
- Native speakers: (4,200 cited 2000 census)
- Language family: Ramu: Grass; Porapora; Adjora
- Dialects: Abu, Auwa, Sabu
- Writing system: Latin

Language codes
- ISO 639-3: ado
- Glottolog: abuu1241
- ELP: Abu
- Map of the region where Adjora is spoken, according to Ethnologue data.

Adjora (Adjoria, Azao) a.k.a. Abu is a Ramu language of Papua New Guinea.

A supposed dialect, Auwa, apparently with few speakers, may be a distinct language. One confirmed dialect, however, is Sabu, which is spoken in the northeast of the language's region.

== Location ==
Adjora is spoken in the Madang and East Sepik provinces of Papua New Guinea, specifically between Angoram, Ramu, and Sepik rivers and in the northwest of Madang. It is used in approximately 22 villages.

== Sociolinguistics ==
Many Adjora words have been borrowed by Tayap, a nearby language isolate that is spoken just to the west of the Adjora area. It is also closely related to the Waran language (also known as Banaro).

Most of its 4,200 speakers are Abu (3,380), though there are 820 Savunese speakers.
