= Tabriak language =

Lower Sepik language of Papua New Guinea

Tabriak
- Karawari
- Native to: Papua New Guinea
- Region: East Sepik Province
- Native speakers: 3,000 (2017)
- Language family: Sepik-Ramu: Lower Sepik (Nor–Pondo); Pondo?; Karawari–Yimas; Tabriak

Language codes
- ISO 639-3: tzx
- Glottolog: tabr1243
- ELP: Karawari

Tabriak, also known as Karawari or Yokoim, is one of the Lower Sepik languages of Papua New Guinea. It is spoken in 9 villages near Chambri in Karawari Rural LLG, East Sepik Province.

A Tabriak Talking Dictionary was produced by Living Tongues Institute for Endangered Languages.

== See also ==
- Yimas-Karawari Pidgin
