= Kopar language =

Lower Sepik language of Papua New Guinea

Kopar
- Native to: Papua New Guinea
- Region: East Sepik Province
- Native speakers: 20 (2016)
- Language family: Ramu–Lower Sepik: Lower Sepik (Nor–Pondo); Nor?; Kopar

Language codes
- ISO 639-3: xop
- Glottolog: kopa1248
- ELP: Kopar
- Coordinates: 3.863426°S 144.525852°E

Kopar is a Lower Sepik language of Marienberg Rural LLG, East Sepik Province, Papua New Guinea.

== Distribution ==
The Kopar language is spoken in Kopar village (3.863426°S 144.525852°E), Marienberg Rural LLG, East Sepik Province. It is also spoken in the villages of Wongan (3.999326°S 144.532123°E) and Singrin (3.939457°S 144.430355°E).

== Status ==
Kopar is a moribund language. It has historically influenced Tayap, a language isolate.
