= Guam River =

River in Papua New Guinea

Guam River Mete River
- Location within Papua New Guinea

Location
- Country: Papua New Guinea
- Region: Madang Province

Physical characteristics
- Source
  - location: Papua New Guinea
- Mouth
  - coordinates: 4°33′19″S 144°37′23″E

The Guam River is a river in northern Papua New Guinea.

== See also ==
- List of rivers of Papua New Guinea
- Guam River languages
- Moam River
