= Nor language =

Sepik language spoken in Papua New Guinea

Murik
- Nor
- Native to: Papua New Guinea
- Region: East Sepik Province
- Native speakers: (1,000 cited 2000)
- Language family: Ramu–Lower Sepik: Lower Sepik (Nor–Pondo); Nor?; Murik

Language codes
- ISO 639-3: mtf
- Glottolog: muri1260
- ELP: Murik
- Nor is classified as Vulnerable by the UNESCO Atlas of the World's Languages in Danger.
- Coordinates: 3.794976°S 143.998682°E

Murik, or Nor, is a Lower Sepik language spoken in Papua New Guinea. It is spoken in Murik ward (3.794976°S 143.998682°E) of Marienberg Rural LLG, East Sepik Province, which is located around a large coastal lagoon.

== Phonology ==
Consonants
	Labial	Alveolar	Palatal	Velar
Plosive	p b	t d	dʒ	k g
Prenasalized	ᵐb	ⁿd	ⁿdʒ	ᵑg
Fricative		s		
Nasal	m	n	ɲ	ŋ
Approximant	w	r	j	

Vowels
	Front	Central	Back
High	i		u
Mid	e	ə	o
Low		a	

== Pronouns ==
Murik independent pronouns are:

	singular	dual	paucal	plural
1	ma	ga-i	ag-i	e<*a+i
2	mi	ga-u	ag-u	o<*a+u
3	mən	məndəb	məŋgə	mwa

== Nouns ==
Murik nouns are inflected for four numbers.

	‘person’	‘house’
singular	nor	iran
dual	normbo	irambo
paucal	norgə	iramoara
plural	normot	iranmot
