= Mwakai language =

Language spoken in Papua New Guinea

Mwakai
- Mongol
- mwa, mwakai
- Native to: Papua New Guinea
- Region: East Sepik Province
- Ethnicity: Mwakai
- Native speakers: 340 (2003)
- Language family: Ramu–Keram: Keram; Mongol–Langam; Mwakai

Language codes
- ISO 639-3: mgt
- Glottolog: mong1344
- ELP: Mongol-Kaimba
- Coordinates: 4.262293°S 143.917638°E

Mwakai, also known as Mongol, is a Keram language of Papua New Guinea.

== Names ==
The name "Mongol" is from Tok Pisin and refers to a village where the language is spoken. Native speakers call the language mwa or mwakai, which mean 'no' or 'nothing'.

== Geographic distribution ==
It is spoken in the villages of Mongol (4.262293°S 143.917638°E, Mongol: Amngwar) and Kaimbal, Keram Rural LLG, East Sepik Province. Many residents of these villages moved to the town of Angoram in the 1970s.

== Phonology ==
Mwakai has 12 consonants and six vowels, shown in the tables below. This section follows Barlow (2020).

Mwakai consonants
		Labial	Coronal	Palatal	Velar
Obstruent	voiceless	p	(t)	s	k
Obstruent	voiced	ᵐb	ⁿd	ⁿd͡ʒ	ᵑɡ
Nasal	voiced	m	n		
Sonorant	voiced	w	r	j	

The sound [t] only occurs in borrowings, with earlier */t/ having historically become /r/; this is belied by the realisation of word-final /r/ as [t~r~l]. /s/ patterns as a palatal consonant, with the optional allophone [ʃ]; there is some interplay between the sounds /s/ and /ⁿd͡ʒ/ in casual speech, with the contrast sometimes being neutralised in favour or either realisation. [ɲ] is a marginal phone which appears in borrowings and occasional as a realisation of /n/ before /i/. /r/ varies between [r ~ ɾ ~ l] and /p/ is occasionally realised as [ɸ].

/w/ and /j/ have a limited distribution, appearing mostly word-initially or -finally, and only rarely intervocalically. Some instances of /j/ and most instances of /w/ may be merely epenthetic, suggesting that Mwakai is in the process of losing its glide phonemes.

Mwakai vowels
	Front	Central	Back
Close	i		u
Mid	e	ə	o
Open		a	

/i u e/ are rarely realised as their cardinal qualities and may approach [ɨ~ɪ ɨ~ʊ ɛ~ə], especially when unstressed.
