= Karachi Bunder And Sidings railway station =

Railway station in Pakistan

Karachi Bunder And Sidings railway station ڪراڇي بندر اينڊ سائيڊنگس ريلوي اسٽيشن

General information
- Owner: Ministry of Railways

Other information
- Station code: KBX

History
- Former names: Great Indian Peninsula Railway

Karachi Bunder And Sidings railway station (Urdu: کراچی بندر اینڈ سائڈنگ ریلوے اسٹیشن, Sindh: ڪراڇي بندر اينڊ سائيڊنگس ريلوي اسٽيشن) is located in Pakistan.

== See also ==
- List of railway stations in Pakistan
- Pakistan Railways
