= Iski language =

Ramu language of Papua New Guinea

Breri
- Kuanga
- Native to: Papua New Guinea
- Region: Madang Province
- Native speakers: 4,500 Breri (2020) and 630 Romkun (2003) (2003–2020)
- Language family: Ramu: Ramu proper; Tamolan–Ataitan; Tamolan; Breri
- Dialects: Breri; Romkun

Language codes
- ISO 639-3: Either: brq – Breri rmk – Romkun
- Glottolog: brer1240 Breri romk1240 Romkun
- ELP: Breri; Romkun

Iski is a Ramu language of Papua New Guinea. Dialects are Breri a.k.a. Kuanga and Romkun.
