= Kanggape language =

Ramu language of Papua New Guinea

Kanggape
- Igom
- Native to: Papua New Guinea
- Region: Madang Province
- Native speakers: (a fraction of 2,200 cited 1981)
- Language family: Ramu: Ramu proper; Tamolan–Ataitan; Ataitan; Kanggape

Language codes
- ISO 639-3: igm
- Glottolog: kang1291
- ELP: Kanggape

Kanggape a.k.a. Igom is a Ramu language of Papua New Guinea. Together with Andarum, there were 2,200 speakers in 1981.
