= Kaian language =

Ramu language spoken in Papua New Guinea

Kaian
- Kayan
- Native to: Papua New Guinea
- Region: Yawar Rural LLG, Madang Province
- Native speakers: 740 (2013)
- Language family: Ramu: Ramu proper; Lower Ramu; Ottilien; Watam; Kaian

Language codes
- ISO 639-3: kct
- Glottolog: kaia1245
- ELP: Kaian
- Coordinates: 4.054465°S 144.736539°E

Kaian (Kayan) is a Ramu language of Kaian village (4.054465°S 144.736539°E) in Yawar Rural LLG, Madang Province, Papua New Guinea.

== Phonology ==
Consonants
	Labial	Alveolar	Palatal	Velar	Glottal
Plosive	p b	t d	dʒ	k g	ʔ
Prenasalized	ᵐb	ⁿd	ⁿdʒ	ᵑg	
Fricative		s			
Nasal	m	n		ŋ	
Approximant	w	r	j		

- /p t k/ are aspirated preceding a vowel.
- /k/ is heard as [ʔ] word-finally or preceding another plosive.
- /dʒ/ can be pronounced [ʒ] or [z] by some speakers.
- /r/ is voiceless [r̥] word-finally.

Vowels
	Front	Central	Back
High	i		u
Mid	e		o
Low		a	

Additionally, the following diphthongs have been observed: /ai/, /au/, /ae/, /ao/, /ea/, /ia/, /iu/, /oa/, /oi/, /ou/, /ua/.

Stress is always found on the antepenultimate syllable. On shorter words, stress falls on the initial syllable.
