= Aruamu language =

Ramu language spoken in Papua New Guinea

Aruamu
- Aruamɨn Akam
- Native to: Papua New Guinea
- Region: Madang Province
- Native speakers: 12,000 (2018)
- Language family: Ramu: Ramu proper; Lower Ramu; Misegian; Aruamu

Language codes
- ISO 639-3: msy
- Glottolog: arua1260
- ELP: Aruamu
- Coordinates: 4.323612°S 144.786058°E

Aruamu, endonym Aruamɨn Akam, a.k.a. Mikarew (Mikarup, Makarup, Makarub), also Ariawiai (Mikarew-Ariaw), is a Ramu language spoken in Mikarew village (4.323612°S 144.786058°E) of Yawar Rural LLG, Madang Province, Papua New Guinea.
