= Keram River =

River in Papua New Guinea

Keram River Little Ramu River, Potter River, Töpfer
- Location within Papua New Guinea

Location
- Country: Papua New Guinea

Physical characteristics
- Source
  - location: Papua New Guinea
- Mouth
  - coordinates: 4°05′07″S 144°03′57″E

The Keram River is a river in northern Papua New Guinea.

== See also ==
- List of rivers of Papua New Guinea
- Keram languages
- Keram Rural LLG
