= Ataitan languages =

Language family of Papua New Guinea

Ataitan
- Tanggu; Moam River
- Geographic distribution: Moam River, Madang Province, Papua New Guinea
- Linguistic classification: Ramu: Ramu proper; Tamolan–Ataitan; Ataitan

Language codes
- Glottolog: tang1354

The Ataitan languages, also known as the Tanggu or Moam River languages, are a small family of clearly related languages spoken in the region of the Moam River in Papua New Guinea. They are,

- Andarum (Kaje)
- Tanguat
- Igom + Tangu (Tanggu)

Z'graggen named the family "Ataitan" as an acronym of the language names. Usher names it after the local river. They are classified among the Ramu languages of northern Papua New Guinea.

== Phonemes ==
Usher (2020) reconstructs the consonant inventory as follows:

*m	*n		*ŋ
*p	*t	*s	*k
*mb	*nd	[*ndz]	*ŋg
*w	*ɾ	*j	*ɣ

Vowels are *i *ʉ *u *a.

== Pronouns ==
Usher (2020) reconstructs the pronouns as:

	sg	du	pl
1	*uku[aɣ]	*naŋgi	*ani
2	*unu[aɣ]	*nuŋgi	*uni[aɣ]
3	*ma(-n)	ma-ni	?

Plus 1sg object *na.

Proto-Tamolan–Ataitan (Proto-Guam–Moam) is nearly identical, except for not having the [aɣ] suffixes, and the final vowels of the 1du and 2du forms is not certain. This may not consider the Porapora languages, however.
