= Keram Rural LLG =

Local-level government in Papua New Guinea

- Location within Papua New Guinea
- Coordinates: 4.319454°S 144.171125°E
- Country: Papua New Guinea
- Province: East Sepik Province
- Time zone: UTC+10 (AEST)

Keram Rural LLG is a local-level government (LLG) of East Sepik Province, Papua New Guinea.

== Wards ==
- 01. Chimundo
- 02. Kambot
- 03. Kambot
- 04. Kambot
- 05. Bobten
- 06. Korokopa
- 07. Pusyten
- 08. Kekten
- 09. Buten
- 10. Yemen
- 11. Manu
- 12. Kambugu
- 13. Pamban
- 14. Bopaten
- 15. Langam (Langam language speakers)
- 16. Mongol (Mongol language (New Guinea) speakers)
- 17. Wom (Wom language (Papua New Guinea) speakers)
- 18. Raten
- 19. Ketro/Samban
- 20. Baniamta
- 21. Kamen
- 22. Marua
- 23. Yanboe
- 24. Nainten
- 25. Yar
- 26. Bagaram
- 27. Kivim
- 28. Longwuk
- 29. Mungum
- 30. Mingnias
- 31. Togo
- 32. Monjito
- 33. Likan
- 34. Klorowom
- 35. Sori
- 36. Paniten
- 37. Pataka
- 38. Mui

== See also ==
- Keram languages
- Keram River
