= Tanggu language =

Ramu language spoken in Papua New Guinea

Tanggu
- Native to: Papua New Guinea
- Region: Madang Province
- Native speakers: (3,000 cited 1991)
- Language family: Ramu: Ramu proper; Tamolan–Ataitan; Ataitan; Tanggu

Language codes
- ISO 639-3: tgu
- Glottolog: tang1355
- ELP: Tangu

Tanggu (Tangu, Tanggum) is a Ramu language of Papua New Guinea.

== Phonology ==
Consonants
	Labial	Alveolar	Palatal	Dorsal
Plosive	p	t		k
Prenasalized	ᵐb	ⁿd	ⁿdʒ	ᵑg
Fricative	β	s z		ʁ
Nasal	m	n	ɲ	ŋ
Approximant		r	j	

- /m/ can occur syllabically [m̩] word-initially.
- /ʁ/ is heard as [ɣ] before /i/.
- /ⁿdʒ/ is pronounced [z~j] in the Wagi dialect.

Vowels
	Front	Central	Back
High	i	ɨ	u
Mid	e		o
Low		a	

- /ɨ/ almost always occurs only in unstressed syllables and diphthongs.

Additionally, the following diphthongs have been observed: /ia/, /ɨa/, /ai/, /ui/, /au/, /ua/. /ai/ is realised as [æ] word-finally.
