= Yaul language =

Keram language of Papua New Guinea

Yaul
- Ulwa
- Native to: Papua New Guinea
- Region: East Sepik Province
- Native speakers: 700 (2018)
- Language family: Ramu: Keram; Mongol–Langam; Yaul

Language codes
- ISO 639-3: yla
- Glottolog: yaul1241
- ELP: Ulwa

Yaul, also known as Ulwa, is a severely endangered Keram language of Papua New Guinea. It is spoken fluently by fewer than 700 people and semi-fluently by around 1,250 people in four villages of the Angoram District of the East Sepik Province: Manu, Maruat, Dimiri, and Yaul. Currently, no children are being taught Ulwa, which has led to the rapid decline of intergenerational transmission for this language.

According to Barlow (2018), speakers in Maruat, Dimiri, and Yaul villages speak similar versions of Ulwa, while those in Manu speak a considerably different version. Thus, he postulates that there are two different dialects of Ulwa.

== Phonology ==
Yaul has 13 consonants and 6 vowels. All information and examples are taken from Barlow (2023).

=== Consonants ===
Yaul consonant phonemes
	Labial	Alveolar	Palatal	Velar
Plain stops	p	t		k
Prenasalised stops	mb /ᵐb/	nd /ⁿd/	nj /ⁿd͡ʒ/	ng /ᵑg/
Nasals	m	n		
Fricatives		s		
Liquids		l		
Glides	w		y /j/	

==== Consonant allophony ====
- No sequences of two adjacent, heterorganic nasals undergo assimilation or coalescence, except for /nᵑg/, where the alveolar nasal is assimilated. When a nasal precedes another nasal with the same place of articulation it is deleted (/in-nda/ > [inda]). Curiously, when /n/ and /k/ cluster, /n/ assimilates to the velar place of articulation of /k/, producing [ŋk], but this does not happen in clusters of /n/ and /p/, which surface as [np].
- The alveolar approximant /l/ may be syllabic if word-final and preceded by the vowel /ɨ/ (/andïl/ > [andl̩]~[andïl] 'carefull'). The pronunciation may vary between [l] and [r~ɾ] for some speakers, but only word-initially and intervocalically.
- The alveolar fricative may palatalise to [ʃ] before /i/ in free variation (/sina/ > [ʃina]~[sina] 'knife').
- Many speakers may add a prothetic glide to words beginning with /u/ or /i/, resulting in [wu] or [ji].
- Words beginning with vowels often have a prothetic glottal stop [ʔ], though speakers prefer words beginning with a high vowel to have a prothetic glide instead.

==== Consonant distribution ====
The plain velar stop does not occur word finally.

Prenasalised stops are not attested word finally, except in one word, kamb 'shun', in which it never surfaces as such without a suffix.

[kam]	[kambe]	[kambïta]	[kamp]
/kamb/	/kamb-e/	/kamb-ta/	/kamb-p/
shun	shun-IMPV	shun-COND	shun-PFV
'shun'	'shun[IMPV]'	'shun[COND]'	'shun[PFV]'

The prenasalised palatal stop (or, more accurately, voiced prenasalised palatal affricate) is almost always followed by high vowels (/i/, /u/), but may be followed by low vowels as well.

=== Vowels ===
Yaul vowel phonemes
	Front	Central	Back
High	i	ï /ɨ/	u
Mid	e		o
Low	(ae /æ/)	a	

Vowel allophony

- /i/ may centralise to [ɪ] in non-careful speech.
- /u/ may centralise to [ʊ] in non-careful speech.
- /e/ may centralise to [ɛ] in non-careful speech.
- /o/ may centralise to [ɔ] in non-careful speech.
- /a/ may centralise to [ʌ] in non-careful speech.
- /ɨ/ is often dropped in words containing it or added to words to break up consonant clusters.

==== Vowel distribution ====
The low front vowel /æ/ has only been found in the Manu dialect and is likely the result of an underlying sequence of /e/ and /a/.

=== Syllable structure ===
Syllables in Yaul may be V, CV, VC, CVC or CCVC. The only complex syllable-initial clusters attested are /kw/, /ᵑgw/, /ᵐbl/, /pl/ and /mw/. Barlow states that, although the sequences /kw/, /ᵑgw/ and /mw/ could instead be analysed as single, labialised consonants, their limited distribution in the language shows that this is unlikely.

=== Stress ===
Stress in Yaul is non-phonemic and mostly appears on the final syllable of the word, though may optionally appear on the penult. Barlow states that the language "may be considered a stress-timed language".

== Word order ==
The word order in Ulwa is generally fixed. There are two categories for word order, and this is based on if the clause is transitive or intransitive. In a transitive clause, the object follows the subject and precedes the verb, leading to a SOV word order. With intransitive clauses, the subject precedes the verb: SV.

Below is an example from Barlow (2018) which represents the SOV word order in a transitive clause:

Amun tïn mï mïnda mame.

Amun tïn mï mïnda ma=ama-e

now dog 3SG.SUBJ banana 3SG.OBJ=eat-IPFV

‘The dog is eating the banana now.’

Furthermore, these fixed categories should only be regarded for active voice clauses. If the construction is in the passive voice, the word order is simply inverted.

Here is another example, this one of the passive construction, showing the inverted word order of VS:

Ndïn asape lamndu.

ndï=n asa-p-e lamndu

3PL=OBL hit-PFV-DEP pig

‘The pig was killed by them.’ [elicited]

== Core argument alignment ==
Ulwa displays one SAP alignment: nominative-accusative. There is no known evidence of ergative-absolutive alignment. This is based on the different forms of third person found. The third person form for both the S and A arguments is mï, while the form for third person P argument is ma=. Since this only occurs for third person markings, it appears that besides this, Ulwa has neutral alignment.

Below is an example using the third person mï for the A argument, and the clitic ma= for the P argument:

Yana mï yata masap i.

Yana mï yata ma=asa-p i

Woman 3SG.SUBJ man 3SG.OBJ=hit-PFV go.PFV

‘The woman hit the man [and] [the woman/*the man] left.’ [elicited]

== Speech act constructions ==
Ulwa has a few different construction types including declarative and interrogative (polar and content). This section will discuss the strategies used to achieve these constructions.

=== Declarative ===
Declarative constructions in Ulwa should be thought of as the 'basic' speech construction in the language. It follows the word order SOV, which is discussed above. No special intonations or strategies are needed for declarative statements, as is seen in the below example from Barlow (2018):

(50) way ango ambi me

way ango ambi me

turtle NEG big NEG

=== Interrogative ===
Interrogative questions can be split into two types in Ulwa: polar form and content form.

==== Polar ====
Polarity questions are essentially yes/no questions. In Ulwa, there is no change in deviation in structure from declaratives when asking an interrogative question. A rise in intonation is used instead.

==== Content ====
Content questions, on the other hand, are questions that elicit information that complete the thought, idea, or construction. An English example of this could be, "Who stole my watch?" In Ulwa, while the word order still does not change, a special morpheme is used, either kwa (who) or angos (what). An example of this is given below:

(52) Kwa utam maamap?

Kwa utam ma=ama-p

One yam 3SG.OBJ=eat-PFV

“Who ate the yam?”

== Sources ==
- Barlow, Russell (2018). A Grammar of Ulwa (PDF) (Ph.D. thesis). University of Hawaiʻi at Mānoa. hdl:10125/62506. Archived from the original (PDF) on 2019-06-06.
- Barlow R (2023). A grammar of Ulwa (Papua New Guinea) (pdf). Berlin: Language Science Press. doi:10.5281/zenodo.8094859. ISBN 9783961104154.
- Barlow, Russell. 2023. A grammar of Ulwa (Papua New Guinea). (Comprehensive Grammar Library). Berlin: Language Science Press.
