= Yawar Rural LLG =

Local-level government in Papua New Guinea

- Location within Papua New Guinea
- Coordinates: 4.272945°S 144.972388°E
- Country: Papua New Guinea
- Province: Madang Province
- District: Bogia District

Area
  - Total: 2,237 km^{2} (864 sq mi)

Population (2021 Estimate)
  - Total: 65,892
  - Density: 29.46/km^{2} (76.29/sq mi)
- Time zone: UTC+10 (AEST)

Yawar Rural LLG is a local-level government (LLG) of Madang Province, Papua New Guinea.

The Lower Ramu languages (Ottilien–Misegian) are all spoken in this LLG.

== Wards ==
- 01. Marangis (Marangis language speakers)
- 02. Kaiyan (Kaian language speakers)
- 03. Boroi (Mbore language speakers)
- 04. Buliva
- 05. Daiden
- 06. Dongan (Bosmun language speakers)
- 07. Awar (Awar language speakers)
- 08. Nubia
- 09. Birap
- 10. Rugusak
- 11. Ambu
- 13. Sepa (Sepen language speakers)
- 14. Rugasak
- 15. Banag
- 16. Giri Tung (Giri language speakers)
- 17. Damangap
- 18. Kumnung
- 19. Minung
- 20. Kuarak
- 21. Mikarew (Mikarew language speakers)
- 22. Abegini
- 23. Dinam Adui
- 24. Apengan
- 25. Ariangon
- 26. Amba Arep
- 27. Aringen Gun
- 28. Dimuk Sirin
- 29. Giar Wazamb
- 30. Andeamarup
- 31. Duapmung
- 32. Andarum
- 33. Ingamuk
- 34. Barit
- 35. Kayoma
- 36. Bang Wokam (Gorovu language speakers)
- 37. Sanai Taringi
- 38. Naupi
- 39. Gwaia Akurai
- 80. Bogia Urban
