= Banaro language =

Ramu language of Papua New Guinea

Banaro
- Waran
- Native to: Papua New Guinea
- Region: Madang & East Sepik Provinces
- Native speakers: 4,000 (2019)
- Language family: Ramu: Ramu proper; Banaro

Language codes
- ISO 639-3: byz
- Glottolog: bana1292
- ELP: Banaro

Banaro is a Ramu language of Papua New Guinea. It is lexically divergent from the other branches of the family, having remarkably few cognates.
