= Ambakich language =

Keram language spoken in Papua New Guinea

Aion
- Ambakich
- Native to: Papua New Guinea
- Region: East Sepik Province
- Ethnicity: 2,000 (2003)
- Native speakers: 770 (2003)
- Language family: Ramu–Keram: Keram; East Keram; Aion

Language codes
- ISO 639-3: aew
- Glottolog: amba1269
- ELP: Ambakich

Aion a.k.a. Ambakich is a Keram language of Papua New Guinea. It is only spoken by adults; children grow up speaking Tok Pisin.

== Phonology ==
Consonants
	Labial	Alveolar	Palatal	Velar
Plosive	p	(t)	tʃ	k
Prenasalized	ᵐb	ⁿd	ⁿdʒ	ᵑɡ
Fricative		s		
Nasal	m	n		(ŋ)
Approximant	w	r	j	

- /t/ and /ŋ/ only appear in loanwords.
- /p/ may sometimes be heard as [ɸ].
- /k/ is sometimes pronounced as [q] or [ʔ], usually word-initially.
- /tʃ/ can manifest as [s], or when adjacent to /ɨ/, [t].
- In certain words, the prenasalized consonants are denasalized.
- /s/ is occasionally [ʃ] before /i/.
- /n/ is heard as [ɲ] before /i/, and [ŋ] before /u/.
- Following /o/ and before any other vowel, /w/ is realized as [ŋ].
- Before /a/, /j/ is heard as [ɲ].
- Before the high vowels /i ɨ u/, /j/ is pronounced [dʒ].

Vowels
	Front	Central	Back
High	i	ɨ	u
Mid	e		o
Low		a	

- The high vowels /i ɨ u/ do not occur word-initially.
- /e/ is occasionally centralized to [ə].
- /a/ is typically raised to [ə] in open syllables.
- /a/ can also range in realization to [ɛ], [ʌ], and [ɔ].
- /u/ is sometimes unrounded to [ɤ].
- /ɨ/ is often deleted between two consonants.

Additionally, the following diphthongs have been observed: /ai/, /ei/, /oi/, /au/, /ou/.
