= Keram languages =

Ramu family languages of New Guinea

Keram
- Keram River
- Geographic distribution: Keram River watershed, Papua New Guinea
- Linguistic classification: Ramu–Keram: Keram
- Subdivisions: East; West (Mongol–Langam)

Language codes
- Glottolog: None

The Keram languages of New Guinea are part of the Ramu family. They are the Mongol–Langam languages and a pair of languages sometimes thought to belong to the Grass family. (See Grass languages for the history of classification.)

Foley (2018) classifies most of them in the Grass branch of the Ramu family, while Usher classifies them as coordinate with the Ramu family, leaving a reduced number of languages in the Grass branch.

They are named for the Keram River.

== Languages ==
- East Keram River
  - Ambakich (Aion)
  - Ap Ma (Kambot)
- West Keram River (Mongol–Langam)
  - Mwakai (Mongol)
  - Pondi (Langam)
  - Ulwa (Yaul)

== Pronouns ==
Usher (2020) reconstructs the pronouns of East Keram and West Keram as follows:

	East Keram		West Keram	
	sg	pl	sg	pl
1	*ni	*anɨ	*ni	*an
2	*[o/u]	*[o/u]nɨ	*u	*un
3	*ma	*aLɨ	*mɨ, *ma-	*ndɨ

== See also ==
- Grass languages
- Keram River
