= Abacetini =

Former tribe of beetles

Abacetini was formerly a tribe of ground beetles in the family Carabidae, but is now considered the subtribe Abacetina of the tribe Pterostichini in the same family.
