= Lower Sepik languages =

Language family of Papua New Guinea

Lower Sepik
- Nor–Pondo
- Geographic distribution: East Sepik Province, Papua New Guinea
- Linguistic classification: a primary language family
- Subdivisions: Nor; Pondo?

Language codes
- Glottolog: lowe1423
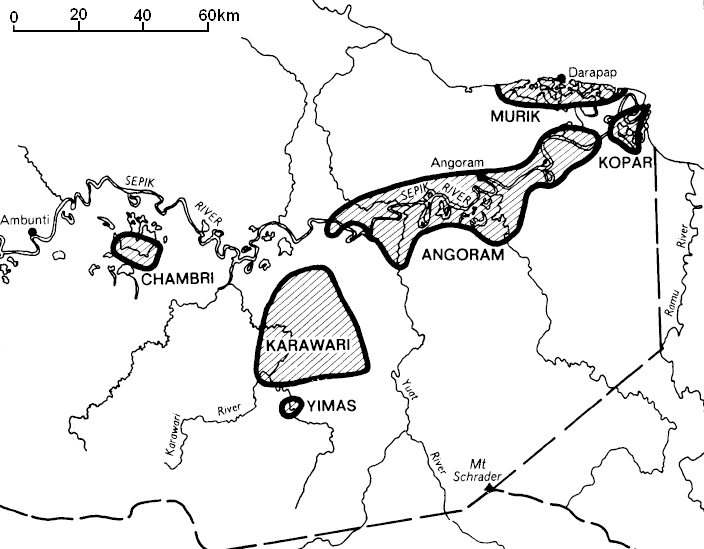

The Lower Sepik a.k.a. Nor–Pondo languages are a small language family of East Sepik Province in northern Papua New Guinea. They were identified as a family by K Laumann in 1951 under the name Nor–Pondo, and included in Donald Laycock's now-defunct 1973 Sepik–Ramu family.

== Classification ==
The original conception of the family, under the name Nor–Pondo, is as follows:

- Nor–Pondo
  - Nor family
    - Murik (Nor)
    - Kopar
  - Pondo family
    - Chambri
    - Karawari (Tabriak), Yimas
    - Angoram (Pondo)

Malcolm Ross (2005) broke up the Nor branch (and thus renamed the family Lower Sepik) because Murik does not share the characteristic /p/s of the first- and second-person pronouns of Kopar and the Pondo languages, so the latter may form a group: Murik vs Kopar–Pondo. Ross classified Lower Sepik as one branch of a Ramu–Lower Sepik language family.

Foley (2005) tentatively proposes that Chambri and Angoram may be primary branches: Nor, Chambari, Karawari–Yimas, Angoram. Usher, following Foley, keeps Nor together and breaks up Pondo. Neither accepts the connection to Ramu.

=== Foley (2018) and Usher (2020) ===
Foley (2018) and Usher (2020) agree on the following classification.

Lower Sepik family

- Kopar–Murik (Nor)
  - Murik
  - Kopar
- Angoram
- Chambri
- Karawari–Yimas
  - Karawari
  - Yimas

Foley notes that Angoram appears to be closer to Murik–Kopar, and Chambri to Karawari–Yimas, but Foley (2018: 213) leaves them as separate branches pending further evidence.

== Phonology ==
Except for Yimas-Karawari, Lower Sepik languages typically have the following six-vowel system.

i		u
e	ə	o
a		

Yimas-Karawari has only four vowels.

i	u
ə	
a	

== Proto-language ==
Proto-Lower Sepik
- Reconstruction of: Lower Sepik languages

=== Pronouns ===
The pronouns reconstructed for the proto-language are,

Proto–Lower Sepik (Ross)

I	*ama	we two	*ka-i, *ka-pia	we few	*(p)a-ŋk-i-t	we all	*a-i, *a-pia, *i-pi
thou	*nɨmi	you two	*ka-u, *ka-pua	you few	*(p)a-ŋk-u-t	you all	*a-u, *a-pu, *i-pu(a)
s/he	*mɨn	they two	*mɨnɨmp ? (M), *mpɨ ? (F)	they few	*mɨŋkɨ-t	they all	*mump (M), *pum (F)

Proto-Nor–Pondo (Foley)

I	*ama	we two	*ka-i, *ka-pa-i	we few	*(pa)ŋk-it	we all	*a-i, *a-pa-i, *(y)i-i, *(y)i-pa-i
thou	*mi	you two	*ka-u, *ka-pa-u	you few	*(pa)ŋk-ut	you all	*a-u, *a-pa-u, *(y)i-u, *(y)i-pa-u
s/he	*mən	they two	?	they few	*mɨŋkɨ	they all	*mump ?

=== Lexicon ===
A phonological reconstruction of proto-Lower Sepik has been proposed by Foley (2005). Foley's (2005) lexical reconstructions are provided below.

Proto-Lower Sepik reconstructions by Foley (2005)

gloss	proto-Lower Sepik	Yimas	Karawi	Chambri	Angrm	Murik	Kopar
one	*mb(w)ia-	mpa-	mba-	mbwia-	mbia-	abe	mbatep
two	*ri-pa-	-rpal	ripay	-ri	-(lɨ)par	kobo	kombari
three	*-ram	-ramnaw	-rianmaw	-ram	-elɨm	keroŋgo	keremɨŋ
person	*nor	nar-maŋ	yarmasɨnar	noranan		nor	nor
male	*pon	panmal	panmari		pondo	puin	
woman	*ŋay	ŋay	asay	kaye	nuŋor	ŋai	nana
water	*arɨm	arɨm	arɨm	arɨm	alɨm	arɨm	arɨm
fire	*awr	awt	awi	ayɨr	aluŋ	awr	awr
sun		tɨmal	sɨmari	sɨnmari	mbwino	akɨn	akɨn
moon	*m(w)il ?	mɨla	tuŋkwi	mwɨl	mɨle	karewan	karep
star		awak	suŋkwiɲcirim	suŋgwi	areɲjo	moai	kinaŋ
canoe	*kay	kay	kay	ke	ke	gain	kain
house		nam	yam	kurɨr	nam	iran	indan
village	*num	num	imuŋka	num	num	nomot	numot
breast	*nɨŋgay	nɨŋay	ɲjay	nɨŋke	ŋge	niŋgen	niŋgin
tooth	*sisiŋk ?	tɨrɨŋ	sɨsɨŋ	sraŋk	sisiŋ	asarap	asirap
blood	*ya-	yat	yay	yari	ayakone	yaran	yuwaran
bone	*sariŋamp	tanɨm	tanɨm	anamp	salɨŋ	sariŋib̩	sarekimp
tongue	*minɨŋ	mɨɲɨŋ	mumɨɲɨŋ	tɨbulaniŋk	mɨnɨŋ	menɨŋ	mimiŋ
eye	*tambri	tuŋkuruŋ	sampɨs	sɨsiŋk	tambli	nabrin	nambrin
nose		tɨkay	ipun	wambusu	naŋɨm	daur	imbot
leg	*namuŋk	pamuŋ	pamuŋ	namaŋk	namuŋ		namɨŋ
hair		wapwi	wampi	yawi	mbwikmaley	dwar	ruar
ear	*kwand-	kwantumuŋ	kwandukas	kukunam	kwandum	karekep	kundot
egg	*awŋ	awŋ	yawŋ	awŋk	awŋ	gaug	awŋ
leaf	*nɨmpramp	nɨmprɨm	yimprɨm	nɨmpramp	namblum	nabirɨk	nɨmbiraŋ
yesterday / tomorrow	*ŋarɨŋ	ŋarɨŋ	arɨŋ	namasɨnɨŋ	nakɨmɨn	ŋarɨŋ	rari
oar	*(mɨ)naŋ	muraŋ	mɨnaŋ	naŋk	inap	inaŋ	naŋ
betelnut	*poruŋ	patn	payn	muntɨkɨn	parɨŋ	porog	puruŋ
lime	*awi(r)	awi	as	ayɨr	awer	air	air
pig	*numpran	numpran	impian	numpran	imbar	nɨmbren	nɨmbren
crocodile		manpa	manpo	ayi	walami	oramen	uri
snake	*wakɨn	wakɨn	wakɨn	wan	paruŋ	wakɨn	ikun
mosquito	*naŋgun	naŋkun	yaŋkun	naŋgun	wawarɨn	nauk	nangɨt
ground	*andi	anti	anti	nɨŋkrump	andi	agin	andin
feces	*mɨndi	mɨlɨm	mɨnti	muɲjar	mɨndi	mɨndɨn	mɨndɨ
hear	*and-	andɨ	andu	andɨ	andɨ	dɨn	nda
hit	*di	tupul	kurar	dɨɨ	ti	di	nɨŋ
eat	*am(b)	am(b)	am(b)	am(b)	am(b)	mɨn	ma
go	*wa	wa	kuria	kal	wa	on	wa
come	*ya	ya	kurapia	ya	ya	ya	ya
sit	*sa	tay	sa	nda		sa	nda
big	*kupa	kɨpa	kupa	wupa	kupa	apo	kapu
cold	*sarV-	tarɨk	sarɨk	saruk	popant		sarapakin

For comparisons with the language isolate Tayap, see Tayap language#Classification.
