= Ramu languages =

Language family of Papua New Guinea

Ramu
- Keram and Ramu Rivers
- Geographic distribution: Ramu and Keram watersheds, Western Madang Province and Eastern East Sepik Province, Northern Papua New Guinea
- Linguistic classification: Ramu–Lower Sepik or a primary language family
- Subdivisions: Middle Ramu; Tamolan–Ataitan–Porapora; Lower Ramu; Keram; Banaro

Language codes
- Glottolog: ramu1234 reduced

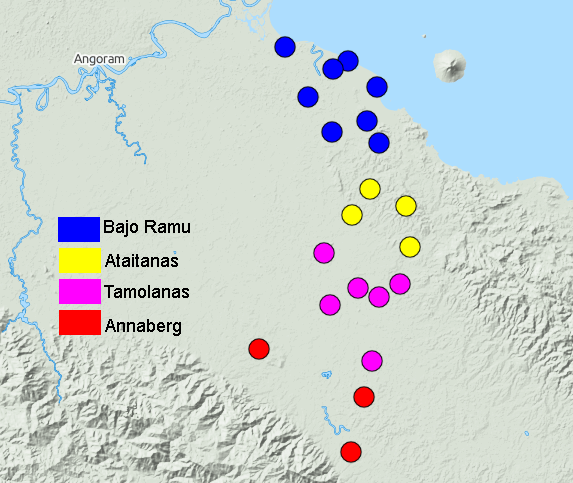

The Ramu languages are a family of some thirty languages of Northern Papua New Guinea. They were identified as a family by John Z'graggen in 1971 and linked with the Sepik languages by Donald Laycock two years later. Malcolm Ross (2005) classifies them as one branch of a Ramu – Lower Sepik language family. Z'graggen had included the Yuat languages, but that now seems doubtful.

With no comprehensive grammar yet available for any of the Ramu languages, the Ramu group remains one of the most poorly documented language groups in the Sepik-Ramu basin.

== Classification ==
The small families listed below in boldface are clearly valid units. The first five, sometimes classified together as Lower Ramu, are relatable through lexical data, so their relationship is widely accepted.

Languages of the Ottilien family share plural morphology with Nor–Pondo.

=== Late 20th century ===
- Ramu
  - Lower Ramu
    - **Ottilien** family
    - **Misegian** (Mikarew) family
    - Grass/Keram family
    - **Ataitan** (Tanggu) family
  - **Tamolan** family
  - **Annaberg** (Middle Ramu) family
  - ? **Mongol–Langam** family

Laycock (1973) included the Arafundi family, apparently impressionistically, but Arafundi is poorly known. Ross (2005) retains it in Ramu without comment, but Foley (2005) and Usher reject inclusion. Laycock (1973) also includes the Piawi languages as a branch, but Ross (2005), Foley (2005) and Usher all reject their inclusion.

=== Usher (2024) ===
Usher breaks up the Grass/Keram family. His classification of Ramu (with both his own and traditional names) as of 2018 is as follows:

- **Ramu and Keram Rivers**
  - Keram River
    - Kambot–Ambakich (East Keram River)
    - Mongol–Langam (West Keram River)
  - Ramu River
    - Banaro (Waran)
    - Guam and Moam Rivers
      - Guam River (Tamolan)
      - Moam River (Ataitan)
    - Lower Ramu River
      - Ramu Coast (Ottilien)
      - Ruboni Range (Misegian)
    - Porapora (Grass proper)
    - South Ramu River (Annaberg)

=== Foley (2018) ===
Foley (2018) provides the following classification, with 5 main branches recognized.

- **Ramu family**
  - Middle Ramu languages
  - Tamolan languages
  - Tangu languages
  - Lower Ramu languages
    - Ottilien languages
    - Ruboni languages
  - ? Grass languages [lexically divergent]
    - Porapora languages
    - Koam languages
    - Banaro
    - Ap Ma (Kambot / Botin)

Tamolan languages and Tangu languages are sparsely documented, and are mostly attested by short word lists.

Grass languages are lexically divergent, sharing very few cognates with the other Ramu languages, with Banaro and Ap Ma sharing almost none. Foley (2018: 205) leaves open the possibility of Grass being a third branch of the Lower Sepik-Ramu family, with Lower Sepik and Ramu being sister branches.

== Pronouns ==
The pronouns reconstructed by Ross (2005) for Proto-Ramu are:

I	*aŋko, *ni	we two	*a-ŋk-a	we	*ai, *nai, *a-ni, *na-ni
thou	*un, *nu	you two	*o-ŋk-oa, *no-ŋk-oa	you	*ne, *u-ni, *nu-ni
s/he	*man	they two	*mani-ŋk ?	they	*mə, *nda, *manda

However, Grass languages have the innovations *ɲi ‘1SG’ and *re ‘3SG’.

== Cognates ==
Proto-Ramu forms that are widespread across the family (except for the Grass languages) are:

gloss	proto-Ramu
‘bird’	*ŋgwarak
‘name’	*v/ɣi
‘ear’	*kwar
‘tooth’	*nda(r)
‘leaf’	*rapar
‘bone’	*(a)gar
‘eat’	*am(b)
‘I’	*(ŋ)go
‘you (SG)’	*nu
‘dative case marker’	*mV

Foley also reconstructs 7 vowels for proto-Ramu:

*i	*ɨ	*u
*e	*ə	*o
*a		

This 7-vowel system is also typical of Ndu languages.
