= Yuat =

Yuat may refer to:

== Papua New Guinea ==
- one of the Yuat languages of Papua New Guinea
- one of the Upper Yuat languages of Papua New Guinea
- the Yuat River
- Yuat Rural LLG in East Sepik Province, Papua New Guinea

== Australia ==
- the Yuat people of Australia
- the Yuat language (Australia)
