= Sister exchange =

Type of marriage

Chart of sister exchange marriage type. Triangle = male, circle = female. Colours represent descent groups.

Sister exchange is a type of marriage agreement where two sets of siblings marry each other. In order to get married, a man needs to persuade his sister to marry the bride's brother. It is practised as a primary method of organising marriages in 3% of the world's societies: in Australia, Melanesia, Amazonia and Sub-Saharan Africa; and can replace other methods in 1.4% of the societies.

Researchers disagree about the reasoning behind sister exchange but most believe that it is some type of reciprocity. Several anthropologists and sociologists expressed objections to the term "sister exchange" believing that it is not accurately describing the actual arrangement.

Despite earlier claims of its simplicity, sister exchange is a complex arrangement that involves many family members and not simply the four people who are getting married.

== Social functions ==
When a man does not have a sister, he can exchange his classificatory sister instead.

Sociologists and anthropologists who are interested in reciprocity study sister exchange. It establishes a symmetrical link between men and binds them together—which can be used to settle pre-existing conflicts. Mark Busse stressed that, since women are not alienable possessions, the exchange was not the end of the transaction but merely the beginning, in accordance with the rules of generosity and honour described by Marcel Mauss.

Many anthropologists pondered the social benefits of sister exchange and reasons why this exchange takes place without any evident "scarcity" of women—contrary to the theory of exchange laid out by Adam Smith. Claude Lévi-Strauss wrote in The Elementary Structures of Kinship that exchanged women are "the supreme gift"; he also asserted that sister exchange embodies the principle of reciprocity present in all marriage and kinship systems. At the same time, the research available to him did not firmly establish the existence of sister exchange without cross-cousin marriage and Lévi-Strauss expressed doubts in whether it is real. However, local census data in Nigeria and other West African countries from 1920s already included information about people who primarily practised sister exchange without cross-cousin marriage. Similarly to Lévi-Strauss, Charles Kingsley Meek wrote that sister exchange is similar to bride price and the former can also be considered a type of exchange marriage with the woman substituted by material possessions.

Jan van Baal did not agree with Lévi-Strauss' position that women are merely objects in this exchange; he argued that women comply with their brothers' wishes because it gives them power and protection. Marilyn Strathern supported this view too, adding that this exchange does not involve disposal of values but lies in the domain of interpersonal relations where kin get indebted to one another. She wrote: "′a model of active subjects exchanging passive objects′ is clearly inadequate for the analysis of sister exchange."

Writing about the origins of this type of marriage, sociologist Peter Bearman came to the conclusion that sister exchange arises from the incest taboo when two men exchange women who they cannot marry. James Weiner draws a parallel between the spread of sister exchange in New Guinea and the prevalence of a certain attitude towards food and vital substances: this marriage is practised by peoples who do not see food as a source of life for men, using direct semen transmission instead.

Several sociologists including Lévi-Strauss claimed that sister exchange is a "primitive" and "simple" system, however, this arrangement involves reaching consensus with not only the siblings themselves but also their parents and other kin because of other factors at play: how old are the siblings, how are the couples related to each other etc. Another difficulty arises if a man does not have an unmarried sister. He might remain unmarried, the marriage might occur without sister exchange, or some criteria for choosing appropriate marriage partners might become more flexible.

== Terminology ==
Alfred Gell who studied Umeda believed that "sister exchange" is not an appropriate term for this type of marriage referring to the fact that the "exchanged" women do not cease being sisters to their brothers; he also argued that sister exchange is not a proper exchange either.

Another objection to this term comes from Robin Fox and Donald Tuzin who pointed out that the exchange is usually organised by senior men (fathers, uncles) and not by the grooms themselves.

== Africa ==
This type of marriage system was described in the "middle belt" of the West Africa ravaged by the slave traders, on the plateau region of Benin (Mbelime), Nigeria and Cameroon (Tiv, Mambila); it is also used in DRC and Uganda (Amba, Mbuti); and on the border between Ethiopia and Sudan (Koman peoples).

Mbuti consider exchange marriages the only permanent type.

=== Koman ===
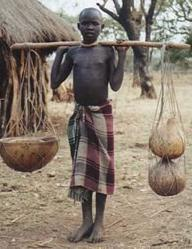
Gumuz girl

Koman-speaking peoples from the savannas on the Ethiopia–Sudan border historically exchanged sisters but by 1970s Uduk people abandoned this method completely, Kwama people partially substituted it with bridewealth payments while Gumuz people still practised it.

The Gumuz marriage is arranged by the elders who hold all the power over their children; the exchange must occur between members of different patrilineal clans. This is the only socially acceptable way of marriage; marrying a woman without providing a sister or daughter in exchange often results in violence and must be "settled" by giving a daughter to the wife's clan later. Elders have considerable authority and often marry their children when the sister is very young—in this case, she moves to her future husband's place and is raised there.

The elders hold less power in Kwama society, women are seen as honourable and important members of the society. They can refuse the arrangement and their family complies with their wishes, but usually the sister agrees in order to not upset her brother. Men see the exchange as an act of losing a sister who is missed. If money is used instead of providing a sister, the brother can ask for a big sum justifying it by the strength of love between his sister and her husband.

Uduk, unlike Gumuz and Kwama, are matrilineal; they abandoned sister exchange but do not use bridewealth because they see it akin to slavery.

=== Mambila ===
Exchange marriage was the standard way of acquiring a marriage partner for Mambila, although other options existed too. If a Mambila man who had married without the exchange found someone who could exchange sisters, he returned his wife to her brother and married with exchange instead. Children from the exchanged woman belonged to their father, but if bride price was paid instead, the children born in this union were returned to the mother's brother.

=== Tiv ===
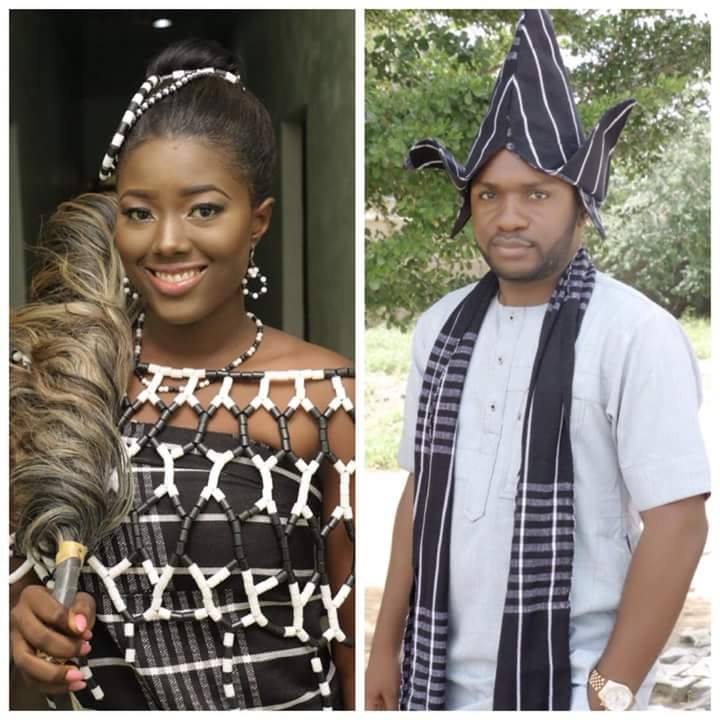
Modern Tiv bride and groom

The most detailed accounts about sister exchange in Africa came from descriptions of Tiv people. British colonial officials made reports about the Tiv system before abolishing it in 1927; however, that did not solve the problems that the British attributed to this type of marriage. Unlike many other peoples, marrying cross-cousins was forbidden for Tiv. After the marriage if one of the exchanged women had more children than the other, she gave them away to her to make the numbers equal.

== Amazonia ==
Macuna people from the eastern part of the Amazon basin exchange sisters between patrilineal descent groups. Sister exchange is considered the most appropriate type of marriage, emphasising the ideal symmetric relationship between descent groups unlike bride kidnapping and gift marriage that imply debt relation.

== Asia ==
=== Mongolia ===
High-ranking Mongol Borjigin clan members exchanged sisters and daughters with Khongirad and Oirat clans which is mentioned in History of Yuan and Jami' al-tawarikh. This marriage exchange was used to strengthen political unions.

=== Pakistan ===
In Pakistan, sister exchange marriage is called watta satta, and about a third of all marriages in rural Pakistan are arranged on this basis.

== Australia ==
=== Warnindhilyagwa ===
Warnindhilyagwa people who inhabit Groote Eylandt, Woodah Island and Bickerton Island in the Northern Territory of Australia also exchange classificatory cross-cousins between moieties. Warnindhilyagwa prefer sister-exchange marriages to other types, yet they are rare due to the low population numbers.

== Melanesia ==
Sister exchange marriage is practised by all inhabitants of the South Central Lowlands of New Guinea.

=== Bun ===
Bun is a village located in the dense rainforest in Angoram District of the East Sepik Province of Papua New Guinea, near the Yuat River. Locals usually practise sister exchange and rarely marry outside of the village. If a Bun man marries a woman from a different village via sister exchange, she moves to Bun and sends a daughter to her home village later. It is rare and undesirable for Bun men to marry without providing a sister as a reciprocity; in this case, he usually leaves the village and resides with his wife's kin. Other types of marriage are undesirable because Bun people consider reciprocity a priority in marriage arrangements; the only exception is marrying a widow.

The ideal candidate for the sister exchange is the groom's full sister but this is not compulsory: Bun people use Iroquois kinship system where many women from the same generation are called "sister"; it is also not important if the exchanged woman belongs to the same clan as him. There is also a strong preference to marry classificatory cross-cousins. Bun people, however, are not rigid in following these rules if it means that a man would stay unmarried.

Discussions about marriage must conclude in agreements not only between the men and women themselves but also their parents and other close relatives. It is, however, customary for a woman's brother (and other male relatives) to have a right to use her in exchange (if she agrees).

Unlike Mundugumor people, Bun men did not use their classificatory daughters (for example, their brother's daughter) to make an exchange.

=== Umeda ===
Umeda people, hunter-gatherers from Sandaun Province in Papua New Guinea, practise sister exchange marriage. Umeda believe that exchanging sisters is worse than if a man seduces or steals a woman to marry, and put the blame for this type of marriage on the Dutch colonisation. Newlywed Umeda men also perform bride service for their in-laws.

=== Wamek and other Boazi ===
Boazi-speaking tribes

Chart of the Boazi marriage arrangement

All Boazi-speaking tribes have a strong preference for sister exchange over other types of marriage considering them unacceptable. Boazi-speaking Wamek tribe who live on marshy plains of the Lake Murray in Papua New Guinea call sister exchange seki towam which literally means "to give women". This marriage type is also used by Pa-speaking people just North-East from the Lake Murray. After marriage the groom provided labour to his father-in-law for an extended period of time, sometimes 10 years and more.

Seki towam occurs between opposing moieties and concludes with a period of bride service which, by extension, implies uxorilocal residence. Close matrilateral relatives are not allowed to become marriage partners; a marriage between second cousins is considered improper although might happen in practice, and third cousins are acceptable partners.

Wamek men are close with their sisters; they give each other food (women provide sago while men give them game), maternal uncles help rearing children and make marriage arrangements for their sister's sons. The bonds between maternal uncles and daughters are weaker but exist nonetheless. Men see their sisters as nurturers while complaining about their wives who order them around.

It is fathers and maternal uncles who arrange a seki towam: after a consultation between the prospective groom's father and maternal uncle (who exchanged his sister for the groom's paternal aunt) the uncle talks to the prospective bride's maternal uncles first, then to her father. If the bride or the groom were adopted, both their adoptive and biological parents participate in the arrangement. Traditionally, the decision was made without consulting the siblings themselves, but in 1970s they could reject the proposed partner.

If a prospective groom does not have a maternal sister of appropriate age or if she does not want to marry the brother of the prospective bride, he might exchange his classificatory sister instead (daughter of the father's brother). This option complicates things as more people need to agree for the marriage to take place. There also is a requirement to return a woman back to the lineage where the man took a sister from (he might return his first-born daughter) as well as giving that lineage a sago swamp.

== Kurdish communities ==
Berdel marriage or sibling swapping is a type of marriage wherein a bride or bridegroom is exchanged with a bride or bridegroom of another family. It is common in a few Kurdish communities. The relatives giving their bridegroom or bride away are typically well-acquainted or friends with the other family. The popularity of berdel marriage is sometimes attributed to the fact that it costs less as there is no dowry, bridewealth or similar exchange of monetary transaction by the groom himself. However, the brides typically exchange their own share of property, which is equal to half of their brother’s property, so that the wives will own property on their husband’s ancestral land, though half as much as their respective husband. This was considered to be the equivalent of a dowry for the brides, though Islamically it would not be considered a valid dowry as it is paid by the husband’s female relative rather than the husband himself or his male relative. Upon a divorce of one couple however, the other couple must also obtain a divorce and the former wives will exchange their property again. Another cause for its popularity is that it cements the friendship that already existed between the exchanging families.

Since there are four people getting married, such a marriage is often referred to as a parallel marriage or four-way marriage. In the event where a family officiant offers a woman to the other family, it is sometimes referred to as sister swapping, daughter swapping or niece swapping. The male counterpart to the same situation is referred to as brother swapping, son swapping, or nephew swapping respectively.

In Turkey, 5% of marriages are berdel marriages, and are called degis tokus, while in Arab countries such marriages are called sigar.

== See also ==
- Exchange of women
