= Meakambut language =

Possible Arafundi language of Papua New Guinea

Meakambut
- Mongolo
- Native to: Papua New Guinea
- Region: East Sepik Province
- Ethnicity: Meakambut
- Language family: Madang – Upper Yuat ?: Upper Yuat ?; Arafundi ?; Meakambut

Language codes
- ISO 639-3: muf (rejected)
- Glottolog: meak1234

Meakambut (Mongolo) is an Arafundi language spoken in Papua New Guinea, by the Meakambut. The language may be synonymous with Andai, although some sources, like Glottolog, treat it as distinct. Due to lack of data, it is impossible to state with any certainty on the status of Meakambut.
