= Tapei language =

Arafundi language of Papua New Guinea

Tapei
- Imboin
- Native to: Papua New Guinea
- Region: East Sepik Province
- Native speakers: 250 (2017)
- Language family: Madang – Upper Yuat: Upper Yuat; Arafundi; Tapei

Language codes
- ISO 639-3: afp
- Glottolog: tape1242

Tapei is an Arafundi language of Papua New Guinea. It is close to Nanubae; the name Alfendio was once used for both.

== Locations ==
Kassell, et al. (2018) list Imanmeri, Wambrumas, and Yamandim as the villages where Nanubae is spoken. Additionally, there are some speakers in Imboin, which also has Andai speakers.

According to Ethnologue, it is spoken in Awim (4.753283°S 143.580166°E) and Imboin (4.792407°S 143.661468°E) villages of Karawari Rural LLG, East Sepik Province.

== Phonology ==
Consonants
	Labial	Alveolar	Palatal	Velar
Plosive	p	t	c	k
Prenasalized	ᵐb	ⁿd	ᶮɟ	ᵑɡ
Nasal	m	n	ɲ	ŋ
Approximant	w	r	j	

- /c/ varies between [c] and [s].

Vowels
	Front	Central	Back
High	i	ɨ	u
Mid	e	ə	o
Low		a	

== Vocabulary ==
The following basic vocabulary words of Alfendio (Tapei) are from Davies & Comrie (1985), as cited in the Trans-New Guinea database:

gloss	Alfendio
head	gʌbʌk
hair	gaƀɷkduma
ear	gunduk
eye	nomguamguk
nose	bogok
tooth	ganžik
tongue	danʌmayʌk
leg	banambʌk
louse	yɩmwin
dog	daʷm
pig	yay
bird	gɩnyɛ
egg	mɩnda
blood	ʔʌndi
bone	džɩmpa; ʔežɩmbʌk
skin	gumbukdea
breast	yɩdʌk
tree	ʔɛt
man	nuŋgumidndža
woman	nam
sun	dum
moon	dɩpar
water	yɩm
fire	yam
stone	naŋgum
road, path	ʔɩnduŋ
eat	nʌmbɩdžik
one	kʰundʌpam
two	kʰundamwin
