= Arafundi =

Arafundi may refer to:

- Arafundi languages
- Arafundi River
