= Mundugumor =

Mundugumor may be:

- Mundugumor people
- Mundugumor language
