= Mundugumor people =

Indigenous people of Papua New Guinea

The Mundugumor (a.k.a. Biwat) are an indigenous people of Papua New Guinea. They live on the Yuat River in East Sepik Province, Papua New Guinea, and speak the Mundugumor language and Melanesian Pidgin.

== Anthropological studies by Margaret Mead ==
The Mundugumor people were first studied by anthropologist Margaret Mead during her field studies in Papua New Guinea from 1931 to 1933. In fact, the only in-depth research done on the Mundugumor was conducted by Mead. She and her husband, Reo Fortune spent two years in the Sepik River region studying the Aarapesh, the Mundugumor, and the Tchambuli peoples. Their second field site was inhabited by the Mundugumor, who, until three years previous, were without governmental control and thrived in a society centered around war, cannibalism, and headhunting.

Based on this background filled with traditions and customs of aggression, Mead noted the Mundugumor as being actively masculine, positively sexed, virile, jealous, violent, hard, and arrogant. The attitudes of the Mundugumor that Mead and Fortune picked up during their field study were notably influenced by Mundugumor ways of marriage and directly influenced female parenting styles. Mundugumor women were strongly affected by the marriage customs and large responsibilities that come with being a mother. They dealt with each milestone in life in unique ways rooted in the traditions of the Mundugumor.

=== Marriage ===
Marriage among the Mundugumor was consummated in many different fashions, all of them encompassing competition and hostility. Marriage was never a quick process, but always arranged in some form. Traditional Mundugumor customs required every man to acquire a wife by giving his sister in return for another man's sister. Because of this requirement, early bonds were created between fathers and daughters and separately between mothers and sons. Brothers and sisters did not communicate with each other and their bond was of pure exchange and benefit on both ends.

Mundugumor men were forbidden from choosing a mate within their own clan and a father's clan and an exchange was forbidden from involving two women of the same group. But despite these rules, they were easily ignored and the obtainment of an ideal mate overshadowed the rules of the community. Affairs and elopements often spawned the desire for marriage, although arrangements had to be made for exchange among the two families.

Polygyny was widely practiced among Mundugumor men, the social ideal being to have as many as eight to ten wives. This socially acceptable way of marriage also created aggression from a wife towards her husband. In any creation of marriage among two individuals, conflict was present and marriage was only valued as obtainment of labor and fertility for the husband.

==== Arranged marriage ====
Among the Mundugumor, arranged marriages were the most common and widely accepted way of creating a husband and wife bond. All arranged marriages in Mundugumor culture involved familial ties and acceptance. Marriages were formed around brother-and-sister exchange. This exchange caused brothers to have pre-emptive rights over their sisters as they acted as their personal passage into marriage. The sisters were taught by their mothers to appreciate this fact and the full value of marriage through exchange. Occasionally, a wife could be paid for with a valuable flute as an exchange. The flute demonstrated purity and virginity and held great value in the eyes of the Mundugumor. Men without sisters could not participate in the brother-and-sister exchange for marriage. They were forced to fight for their wives physically and mentally. A family with many sons and no daughters held a future full of physical feuding.

Arranged marriages were also common among two very young adolescents. If there were two sibling pairs around the same age, a peacemaking ceremony could occur between the two fathers, arranging marriage among the pairs. Many times though, because the Mundugumor were so centered around sister for sister exchange, they paid little attention to relative ages.

It is also true that an older sister could be the property of her considerably younger brother. When a girl chose her husband or a marriage arrangement was made, a wife also had to be selected for her brother. If a girl was nearing adolescence, she was sent almost immediately to live in her betrothed husband's household. This allowed her own kin to shift the responsibility for her elopement if it was to occur. In these situations, the husband was almost always younger than the wife. As the girl developed in this household, she may catch the eye of the father or an elder brother of her boy husband. If this occurred, a struggle would develop among the family members.

If she preferred one member of the family above another, she chose that male as her husband and her choice was final. If she hated the entire family as a group, she was fought over with little say in the matter, unless she was able to find a lover who would elope with her. If she failed to catch the eye of another male family member, the household focused on chaperoning the girl. This chaperoning involved the forceful compliance of her boy husband to engage in sexual relations with his official wife. This young couple then had the ability to begin creating a family and continue their lives together.

==== Affairs ====
Despite the prevalence of arranged marriages among the Mundugumor, affairs could occur in hopes of spawning marriage or elopement. Because of the stress on arrangement marriage, there was a violent preference for the selection of one's mate. Sexual affairs occurred in the bush of New Guinea, out of eye and earshot of other members of the community. Those who took a lover had to conceal their activity to avoid teasing and disapproval. Sexual affairs involved rough foreplay that began with violent scratching and biting matches to create the maximum amount of excitement. Physical violence was often accompanied by the breaking of the arrows or baskets and ornaments of the beloved to demonstrate the passion that was consumed. Members of both sexes are known and expected to be aggressive in their sexual encounter, but also equally jealous of one another and vengeful of other affairs.

Some girls had many affairs before they were even married. This concealment of this type of unmarried affair was even more important. The Mundugumor valued virginity in their daughters and their wives and virginity was crucial in the brother-and-sister exchange. Only a virgin could be exchanged for a virgin. If a woman's lack of virginity was exposed, she could only be exchanged for a woman whose exchange value was equally damaged in a similar fashion.

Married men had more affairs than married women. A young girl's first lover was often a married man. Because of her vulnerability in the situation, the girl often attempted to persuade the married man to elope with her and take her as his wife. If he protested, she may run away with him anyway. If the girl was lucky enough to have a sympathetic father or her lover has a younger sister that was available as a wife for her brother, she may have been able to approach her father about her hopes to marry this man. These conditions were rare. If confronting her father was not an option, the girl would many times run away with her dowry in her possession. This dowry (a sacred flute) was as important to the girl's family as it is to her, so a fight often followed. Her relatives would pursue her as she attempted to escape and a battle was fought. Around one third of Mundugumor marriages began in this violent fashion.

If a married man wanted another man's wife or the daughter of another man, the pair must first elope. After eloping, the man had to defend his women against the enraged relatives and/or husband that would come to fight for her labor and fertility. After defending his new wife, the man was forced to compensate the girl's family for her position in the family. This compensation could be a kindred women or a valuable sacred flute.

==== Polygyny ====
The division of Mundugumor families can be attributed to the practice of polygyny. The Mundugumor had a form of organization called a "rope". A man's rope was composed of a man, his daughters, and his daughters' son's daughters. A female rope consisted of a woman, her sons, her sons' daughters, and her sons' daughters' sons. Sons were bound in allegiance to their mothers and daughters to their fathers. In Mundugumor culture, having many wives was a symbol of wealth and power. Because of a man's desire to have a polygynous household, tension was created between fathers and sons in the form of competition and between husbands and wives in the form of jealousy.

Traditionally, Mundugumor people were not permitted to marry outside of their generation, but none of their own rules were respected. Fathers harbored a desire to have many young wives. This desire caused competition between fathers and sons, as they were competing for the same wives among the same families. At the same time, a mother favored her sons because a daughter could be used as an exchange for her husband to obtain another wife.

As wives aged, they became less desirable and husbands look for younger wives. Because of this, a mother favors the exchange of her daughter for a son's wife rather than for a new wife for her husband. If an older wife objected to her husbands taking multiple wives, she was beaten for her defiance. Her son was expected to defend his mother and act violent towards the father, creating more tension in the home.

=== Motherhood ===
Beginning with pregnancy, Mundugumor women found motherhood a time of stress and inconvenience. When a woman gave her husband the news of her pregnancy, he immediately became unhappy and was considered a marked man. He could no longer live a life as he did before, and was officially known as a father. It was common for husbands to abuse their wives if they became pregnant early on in the marriage. He cursed the pregnancy magic that he conducted after intercourse to prevent pregnancy. There was also a taboo against intercourse during pregnancy in fear of one child turning into twins; therefore women associated their pregnancy with sexual deprivation, as well as her husband's anger and repudiation, and the continual risk that he would take another wife and desert her.

==== Before birth ====
Before the child was born, there was much contemplation over the fate of the child. Whether the child was to be kept and allowed the chance at life many times depends on whether the child is male or female. Though mothers many times wanted male children, the decision was weighted against her because the father and brothers preferred girls. Without female children, the boys in the kin-group would have trouble when it came to exchange for a wife. Boys had a greater chance of being kept alive as the birth order increased. If the first child was a boy, they had the poorest chances of living.

If a wife became pregnant, and the husband did not believe that he had had enough sexual experience with his wife for the child to be his, the child had little chance of survival, regardless of the gender. The husband not only desired the death of this child, but also shamed and abused the wife to the extent that she too wished to have the child killed.

If the couple chose against preserving the life of their child, Mundugumor practiced infanticide. Their most commonly chosen pathway was throwing the recently born infant into the Yuat River. The infant could still be alive, doomed to drowning, or strangled to death before it was disposed of in the river.

==== After birth ====
Mundugumor children were not welcomed to earth with warmth and love. Instead, babies were seen as a hassle until they could fend for themselves. Mothers were the primary caregivers for their children and continued with their daily routines shortly after childbirth. In fact, a father rarely even held his children. Mothers were expected to do the feeding, caring for, and weaning of their children. Despite the load this responsibility may bring, Mundugumor mothers took it in stride and expected their children to mature extremely quickly.

Women comforted their children with food as an attempt to stop their wailing and only tended to the needs of the child during feeding. Women breastfed their children standing up, supporting their child with one hand in a position that was straining to the mothers arm and pinions the arms of the baby. The child was given no comfort as it gained its nutrition and the Mundugumor ensured no sensuous pleasure in feeding. The child was forbidden from prolonging his meal in any way, including playful fondling of his mother's body or his own.

To Mundugumor women, the point of feeding their child was for him or her to absorb enough food to stop crying and allow the mother to place the child back in their basket. This hurried sense of what seems to be the only form of comfort provided by mothers was what caused the first signs of violence and competition in a Mundugumor individual. Because there was always a risk of being refused feeding, babies developed a fighting attitude while being nursed, holding on firmly to the mother's nipple and sucking milk as fast as possible. This harried notion of feeding caused many babies to choke from swallowing too fast. This choking irritated the mother and angered the child as they failed to accomplish their goal of satisfaction. Because of this, feeding became a situation of anger and struggle instead of reassurance and affection.

From the moment children could walk, they were expected to fend for themselves. Aside from feeding, children were taught to act individually early on. Once a child was around one or two years old, they were carried around on the mother's back. Early in the child's life, mothers would, despite the well known risk of strangulation, carry their babies by the armpit. As children grew older and could hold on for themselves, mothers would sit their children astride the mother's neck and expect them to hold onto their mother's hair for support. Once astride the neck, mothers returned to working in the fields to provide for their families. Babies were rarely held, and if they were held it was not by the mothers but instead by small daughters of other mothers.

Mundugumor mothers did not conform to warm and comforting personalities. Instead, they laughed at the fears of their children, punished them for crying during injury or discomfort, and joined along in the teasing done by other, older children. Before the Mundugumor village was placed under Australian governmental control, they even had the custom of giving their own children as hostages to temporary trade allies. They would leave their children, usually sons due to their lack of value, to prove their trust and reliability. This tradition showed the lack to connection and value of children to the Mundugumor people in general.

== Later studies ==
Mead returned to the village in 1971 and initially found her opinion of it unchanged; however, encouraged by fellow anthropologist Nancy McDowell, who had worked with other communities on the Yuat River, she began to undertake a more comprehensive study. She died in 1978 before the study could be completed, but her book was finished by McDowell and published in 1991 as The Mundugumor: From the Field Notes of Margaret Mead and Reo Fortune.

Mead and McDowell found that the Mundugumor people, now called the Biwat, had in fact changed very much since the original study in the 1930s. They did not remember the "rope" system, and many of them did not understand the indigenous kinship terminology described by Mead, as they now spoke Melanesian Pidgin. Most of them were now Catholic, although a land dispute with a local mission had forced the closure of the mission's airstrip. Education was widely available, and many sought higher education at schools like the University of Papua New Guinea. McDowell visited the village herself for two weeks in 1981 and described them as "warm, open and generous ... as well as assertive and volatile", concluding that she "liked them very much".

The Yuat River was still the main route of transportation, and the Biwat travelled by motorized canoes to buy and sell their produce in nearby Angoram, Wewak, and Madang. The main cash crops were still tobacco and betel nut, as they had been in the 1930s, and most of their food was still produced by slash-and-burn agriculture. They now kept other livestock aside from pigs, including cattle.

McDowell also reexamined Mead and Fortune's field notes from their original visit, and found that these too could be interpreted more charitably. She also reanalyzed Mead and Fortune's notes about the "rope" kinship system and came to different conclusions about its meaning. She described Mead's notes as "remarkable" and "so thorough, clear and professional" that they allowed her to construct a general ethnography of the people as Mead had originally intended.
