= Kyenele language =

Yuat language spoken in Papua New Guinea

Kyenele
- Miyak
- Native to: Papua New Guinea
- Region: East Sepik Province
- Native speakers: 1,300 (2003)
- Language family: Yuat: Kyenele

Language codes
- ISO 639-3: kql
- Glottolog: kyen1243
- ELP: Miyak
- Coordinates: 4.602663°S 143.844495°E

Kyenele a.k.a. Miyak is a Yuat language of Papua New Guinea.

Versions of its name include Keñele, Keyele, Kenying, Bulang, Kenen Birang, Kyenying-Barang.

It is spoken in Giling (Girin) (4.602663°S 143.844495°E), a village located on the banks of the Yuat River in Yuat Rural LLG, East Sepik Province.
