= Nanubae language =

Arafundi language of Papua New Guinea

Nanubae
- Lower Arafundi
- Native to: Papua New Guinea
- Region: East Sepik Province
- Native speakers: 1,300 (2005)
- Language family: Madang – Upper Yuat: Upper Yuat; Arafundi; Nanubae

Language codes
- ISO 639-3: afk
- Glottolog: nanu1240

Nanubae (Kapagmai, Aunda) is an Arafundi language of Papua New Guinea. It is close to Tapei; the name Alfendio was once used for both.

== Locations ==
Kassell, et al. (2018) list Imanmeri, Wambrumas, and Yamandim as the villages where Nanubae is spoken. Additionally, there are some speakers in Imboin, which also has Tapei speakers.

According to Ethnologue, it is spoken in Imanmeri (4.646309°S 143.604125°E), Wambrumas (4.726468°S 143.564188°E), and Yamandim (4.73418°S 143.611984°E) villages of Karawari Rural LLG, East Sepik Province.
