= Karawari Rural LLG =

Local-level government in Papua New Guinea

- Location within Papua New Guinea
- Coordinates: 4.606285°S 143.506633°E
- Country: Papua New Guinea
- Province: East Sepik Province
- Time zone: UTC+10 (AEST)

Karawari Rural LLG is a local-level government (LLG) of East Sepik Province, Papua New Guinea. Various Ramu, Arafundi (Upper Yuat), and Sepik languages are spoken in the LLG.

== Wards ==
- 01. Masandanai
- 02. Kaiwaria
- 03. Manjamai
- 04. Konmei
- 05. Ambonwari
- 06. Imanmeri (Nanubae language speakers)
- 07. Kanjimei
- 08. Kundiman
- 09. Yimas (Yimas language speakers)
- 10. Awim (Tapei language speakers)
- 11. Yamandim (Nanubae language and Tapei language speakers)
- 12. Imboin (Andai language speakers)
- 13. Amongabi
- 14. Chimbut
- 15. Sikalum
- 16. Yanitabak
- 17. Latoma (Sumariup language speakers)
- 18. Malamata
- 19. Kotkot
- 20. Mamri
- 21. Sangriman
- 22. Tungimbit
- 23. Kambraman
- 24. Kraimbit
- 25. Kaningara (Kaningra language speakers)
- 26. Govanmas
- 27. Anganambai
- 28. Tarakai
- 29. Meska
- 30. Bisorio
