= MVK =

MVK may refer to:

- Mekmek language
- Methyl vinyl ketone
- Mevalonate kinase, enzyme encoded by the MVK gene
- MVK Zrt., a Hungarian transport company
