= Bun language =

Yuat language of Papua New Guinea

Bun
- Native to: Papua New Guinea
- Region: East Sepik Province
- Native speakers: 480 (2003)
- Language family: Yuat: Bun

Language codes
- ISO 639-3: buv
- Glottolog: bunn1240
- ELP: Bun
- Coordinates: 4.415234°S 143.859962°E

Bun is a Yuat language of Papua New Guinea. It is spoken in Biwat village (4.415234°S 143.859962°E) of Yuat Rural LLG, East Sepik Province.
