= Andai language =

Arafundi language of Papua New Guinea

Andai
- Upper Arafundi
- Native to: Papua New Guinea
- Region: East Sepik Province
- Native speakers: 440 (2017)
- Language family: Madang – Upper Yuat: Upper Yuat; Arafundi; Andai

Language codes
- ISO 639-3: afd
- Glottolog: anda1283
- ELP: Meakambut

Andai (Pundungum, Wangkai) is an Arafundi language of Papua New Guinea. Meakambut may be identical, but due to lack of data this cannot be determined with certainty.

== Locations ==
Kassell, et al. (2018) list Namata, Kupina, Kaiyam, Andambit, and Awarem as the villages where Nanubae is spoken. In the Andai area, the Mongolo (or Meakambut, after one of their former villages) people, a group of about 50–60 people, live east of the Arafundi River; Kassell, et al. (2018) believe this may be a separate ethnolinguistic group.

According to Ethnologue, it is spoken in Andambit (4.953147°S 143.586822°E), Awarem, Imboin (4.792407°S 143.661468°E), Kaiyam (4.918344°S 143.528512°E), Kupini (4.942655°S 143.581077°E), and Namata mountain (4.860561°S 143.598304°E) villages in Imboin ward, Karawari Rural LLG, East Sepik Province.
