= Piawi languages =

Upper Yuat language family of Papua New Guinea

Piawi
- Schraeder Range; Waibuk
- Geographic distribution: Schraeder Range, Madang Province, Papua New Guinea
- Linguistic classification: Madang – Upper Yuat: Upper Yuat; Piawi
- Subdivisions: Hagahai; Haruai

Language codes
- Glottolog: piaw1238

The Piawi languages are a small family of Papuan languages spoken in the Schraeder Range of the Madang Highlands of Papua New Guinea that had been part of Stephen Wurm's Trans–New Guinea proposal. They are now connected to the Arafundi and Madang languages.

The name "Piawi" is an acronym of three language varieties: Pinai (Pinaye), Aramo/Aramaue (Hagahai) and Wiyaw (Harway/Waibuk). Pinai and Hagahai are often classified as a single language.

== Classification ==
Piawi consists of only two languages:

- Piawi family: Pinai-Hagahai, Haruai (Waibuk)

Davies and Comrie (1985) noted some pronominal similarities with the Engan languages in Trans–New Guinea, which Ross took into consideration, but no lexical similarities. Comrie believes the family is as isolate. William A. Foley suggested that Piawi and Arafundi may be related (Comrie 1992), and according to Ross a connection with Arafundi or Ramu appears more promising than Engan. Timothy Usher confirms the link to Arafundi.

== Pronouns ==
Below is a comparison of proto-Piawi, proto-Ramu, Arafundi, and proto-North Engan pronouns, per Ross. Initial nasals are ubiquitous, and indeed are very common throughout New Guinea, so they are in themselves not good evidence of a relationship.

	"I"	"thou"	"s/he"	"we two"	"you two"	"we"	"you"
p-Piawi	*ni-ga	*na-ga	*nu-ga	*(n)ane-ga-li(mi)	*ni-ga-li(mi)	*ane-ga, *nane-ga	*ni-ga
p-Ramu	*aŋko, *ni	*un, *nu	*man	*a-ŋk-a	*(n)o-ŋk-oa	*a-ni, *na-ni	*u-ni, *nu-ni
Arafundi	ɲiŋ	nan	nda	aci	niɲi	aŋ	nuŋ
p-N Engan	*na-ba	*ne-ba	*-ba	*na-li-ba	*ɲa-li-mba	*na-ni-ma	*ɲa-ma, *ɲa-ka-ma

Both Engan and Piawi have a dual suffix *li.

== Vocabulary comparison ==
The following basic vocabulary words are from Davies & Comrie (1985), as cited in the Trans-New Guinea database. The Haruai data is from Tonson (1976).

The words cited constitute translation equivalents, whether they are cognate (e.g. waɲa, wəɲa, wɛɲa for “dog”) or not (e.g. haŋietʰ, nauŋasi, namagə for “nose”).

gloss	Haruai (Wiyaw dial.)	Pinai-Hagahai (Wakadadap dial.)	Pinai-Hagahai (Nangenuwetan dial.)	Pinai-Hagahai (Aramo dial.)	Haruai	Pinai-Hagahai
head	ˈjeʥ̮ᵊˈmat̮ɑ	ɩʥ̮ɩboˈʥ̮ɛ	idᴶibəˈdᴶə	iʥ̮uəˈxə	yɛtʸəmatʸ	ɩʥ̮ɩˈboʥ̮ɛ
hair	jeʥ̮ᵊˈϕan	ɩʥ̮ɷmuˈda	idᴶimuˈda	iˌʥ̮iməˈda	yɛntʸəᵽan	ɩʥ̮ɷmɷˈda
ear	ɾ̥ɨmɨnt̮ɕ	jɛnɷaˈʥ̮ə	jənˈwadᴶə	jɛnˈwaϕe		jɛnuˈaʥ̮ɩ
eye	ˈmomakʰ	məmɛˈʥ̮i	mɛmɛˈdᴶi	mɛmɛʥ̮əˈmagə	mɛmaŋk	mɛmɛˈʥ̮i
nose	haŋiˈetʰ	nauˈŋasi	namaˈga	namaˈgə	haŋantʸ	namaˈgə
tooth	andzᵊmakᵡ	ad̮ʑuaˈbə	adᴶuˈabɤ	ˌjɛd̮ʑɩ ˈmagə		ad̮ʑuaˈβə
tongue	alᵊˈbʌɲ	t̮suˈə; t̮suˈɛ	suˈwɔ	suˈə; syê		sjuˈə
leg	ϕaˈletʰ	əˈda; həˈda	ˌaɤɔjɔˈdu	həˈdaməˈsi		aˈɽɐd̮ʑə
louse	jɩm	nəˈma	ɭɛˈma	iˈmɤd̮ʑi	yɩm	
dog	waɲa	wəˈɲa; wɛˈɲa	wəˈɲa	wɛˈɲa	wañə	wɛˈɲa
pig	han	jɛˈnə	jɛˈnɤ	jɛˈnɤ	han	jɛˈnə
bird	ˈjaʷər	jauˈr̥ɷ; jauˈtʰɷ	jauˈt͑u	jauˈthə	yawʌř	jauˈr̥u; jauˈthu
egg	jaur mɩntɕ		ˈjautʰumuˈsi	jauˈt͑umuˈsi	məntʸ	
blood	haɲ	geˈja	aˈt͑aɤi	gaˈja		
bone	jantʰ	joˈdu	jɔˈdu	jɛˈdə		
skin	jɩmaɤ wɨɲ	ɽəˈxa	ɭIˈk͑a	wɩˈɲi	wəñ	Iˈda
breast	kau	aˈu	aˈu	aˈhu		
tree	bɨ	məˈna	muˈna	mɤˈna	bï	
man	ˈnabʌ	naˈba	naˈba	naˈba	nʌmbə	woˈdu
woman	mʌ	jaˈma	jəˈma	məˈgə	mʌg	jamˈwa
sun	naijʌ	ɽəˈma	nuˈma	ɽəˈma	naiyə	
moon	r̥̃ʌn	tsoxɷˈno	sɔkᵡɷˈnə	sɔˈkɷnə	hřawən	
water	ɾ̥aˈbʌ	gɯ	gɯ	gɯ	hřʌmbə	
fire	ɾ̥ᵼn	ɲabɯ; ɲabu	ɲaˈbu	ɲaˈbɤ	hřən ᵽin	
stone	ɾ̥ɩgɨ	ɽɩˈgə	ɭɨˈgə	ɽɩˈgə	hřəŋk	ɽɩˈgə
road, path	ganɨmϕ	ˈsaba ʥɩmur̥əmam	ˈdᴶɩmɷtʰɩ	ˈdiədə	anəmbi	
name	hʌmpʰ	mɛˈi	aˈt̮ɕaβəde	nabamɩˈhe	yɩmpʰ	
eat	nɨmˈda	jaˈd̮ʑi	ja⋅ˈdᴶɩmɩnə	ˌmoməˈdɛɽə		
one	waɲɩŋˈgeϕ	joɽoˈdə	ˈjɔ⋅ɤɔdə	aˈgə	paŋɛmp	
two	jɩˈmag ˈjɩŋgʷʌ	janˈdɛɽimi	ˈjadaɤɩn	ˌhəgəˈnaβəmaˈɨ	mʌs	

== See also ==
- Upper Yuat languages
