= Awiakay language =

Arafundi language of New Guinea, PNG

Awiakay
- Karamba
- Native to: Papua New Guinea
- Region: East Sepik Province
- Native speakers: 400 (2023)
- Language family: Madang – Upper Yuat: Upper Yuat; Arafundi; Awiakay

Language codes
- ISO 639-3: None (mis)
- Glottolog: awia1234
- ELP: Awiakay

Awiakay is a little-known Arafundi language of New Guinea. It is spoken in one village (Kanjimei) in East Sepik Province. It is classified as "vulnerable" by the Endangered Languages Project; between 300 and 400 people speak the language.
