= Hagahai language =

Piawi language of Papua New Guinea

Hagahai
- Pinai
- Native to: Papua New Guinea
- Region: Enga–Madang border
- Native speakers: 700 (2005)
- Language family: Madang – Upper Yuat: Upper Yuat; Piawi; Hagahai

Language codes
- ISO 639-3: pnn
- Glottolog: pina1252
- ELP: Pinai-Hagahai

Hagahai, also known as Pinai, is one of two languages of the Piawi family of New Guinea.

Speakers in Enga Province use the name Pinai for all Pinai-Hagahai speakers. Those in Madang use Hagahai, at least for themselves. Exonyms include Wapi and Miamia in Enga and Aramo in Haruai.

Dialects are divergent, but speakers have a common identity.

== Writing system ==
Hagahai alphabet
Pronunciations	ɑ	æ	b	d	e	ə	g	i	ɨ	dz	k	l	m	n	o	p	s	t	u	w	j
Letters	a	ae	b	d	e	o	g	i	u	j	k	l	m	n	o	p	s	t	u	w	y
