= Haruai language =

Language family

Waibuk
- Haruai
- Native to: Papua New Guinea
- Region: Madang Province
- Native speakers: (2,000 cited 2000)
- Language family: Madang – Upper Yuat: Upper Yuat; Piawi; Waibuk
- Dialects: North (Hamil); Central (Mambar); South (Arama)

Language codes
- ISO 639-3: tmd
- Glottolog: haru1245
- ELP: Haruai

Haruai (less commonly Harway) is one of two languages of the Piawi family of New Guinea. The language has borrowings from Kalam. Young men are likely to know Kobon and Tok Pisin, but many Haruai are monolingual. Haruai is also commonly known as Waibuk, also Wiyaw, Wovan, Taman.

Dialects are North Waibuk (Hamil), Central Waibuk (Mambar), South Waibuk (Arama); word taboo is practiced but does not impede communication.

== Language contact ==
Due to intensive language contact, Haruai shares 35 percent of its vocabulary with Kobon (a Trans-New Guinea language belonging to the Madang branch), which is the same proportion of vocabulary that Haruai shares with the related language Hagahai. Some lexical examples:

| gloss | native Harway word | borrowed Harway word | Kobon word |
|---|---|---|---|
| ‘sun’ | nayə | sdə | sda |
| ‘dog’ | wəɲə | kəyn | kayn |
| ‘father’ | acə | bəp | baap |
| ‘wife’s brother’ | (no native word) | bənəy | bane |
| ‘grandmother’ | (no native word) | əpsəw | aps |
| ‘ear’ | (no native word) | rmj | rmd |

Harway has both native and borrowed terms for words like ‘sun’, ‘dog’, and ‘father’, but in the case of ‘wife’s brother’, ‘grandmother’, and ‘ear’, only loanwords of Kobon origin are used.

== Phonology ==
Consonants
| | Labial | | Alveolar | Palatal | Velar | |
| | oral | pal. | Alveolar | Palatal | oral | pal. |
|---|---|---|---|---|---|---|
| Plosive | p | pʲ | t | c | k | |
| Prenasalized | ᵐb | ᵐbʲ | ⁿd | ᶮɟ | ᵑg | ᵑgʲ |
| Fricative | | | s | | | |
| Nasal | m | mʲ | n | ɲ | ŋ | ŋʲ |
| Approximant | w | | r, l | j | | |

Vowels
| | Front | Central | Back |
|---|---|---|---|
| High | i | ɨ | u |
| Mid | e | ə | o |
| Low | | a | |

== Bibliography ==
- Comrie, Bernard. 1987. A Grammar of the Wiyaw Language. Unpublished Technical Report presented to the National Science Foundation on Project BNS-8504293.
- Bernard Comrie, 1988, ‘Haruai verb structure and language classification in the Upper Yuat’. Language and Linguistics in Melanesia 17: 140–160.
- Comrie, 1989, ‘Haruai attributes and processing explanations for word order’. In F.J. Heyvaert and F. Steurs, eds.: Worlds Behind Words: Essays in Honour of Prof. Dr. F.G. Droste on the Occasion of his Sixtieth Birthday. (Symbolae Facultatis Litterarum et Philosophiae Lovaniensis, Series C Linguistica, volume 6), 209–215. Leuven: Leuven University Press.
- Comrie, 1990, ‘Lexical variation and genetic affiliation: The case of Haruai’. In Jerold A. Edmondson, Crawford Feagin, and Peter Muhlhausler, eds.: Development and Diversity: Linguistic Variation Across Time and Space: A Festschrift for Charles-James N. Bailey (Summer Institute of Linguistics and the University of Texas at Arlington Publications in Linguistics 92), 461–466. Dallas: Summer Institute of Linguistics and Arlington: University of Texas at Arlington.
- Comrie, 1991, ‘How much pragmatics and how much grammar: the case of Haruai’. In Jef Verschueren, ed.: Pragmatics at Issue, 81–92. Amsterdam: John Benjamins.
- Comrie, 1991, ‘On Haruai vowels’. In Andrew Pawley, ed.: Man and a Half: Essays in Pacific Anthropology in Honour of Ralph Bulmer, 393–397. Auckland: The Polynesian Society.
- Comrie, 1993, ‘The phonology of heads in Haruai’. In Greville G. Corbett, Norman M. Fraser, and Scott McGlashan, eds.: Heads in Grammatical Theory, 36–43. Cambridge: Cambridge University Press.
- Comrie, 1993, ‘Some remarks on causatives and transitivity in Haruai’. In Bernard Comrie and Maria Polinsky, eds.: Causatives and Transitivity (Studies in Language Companion Series 23), 315–325. Amsterdam: John Benjamins.
- Comrie, 1995, ‘Serial verbs in Haruai (Papua New Guinea) and their theoretical implications’. In Janine Bouscaren, Jean-Jacques Franckel, Stéphane Robert, eds.: Langues et langage: Problèmes et raisonnement en linguistique, mélanges offerts à Antoine Culioli, 25–37. Paris: Presses Universitaires de France.
- Comrie, 1998, ‘Switch reference in Haruai: grammar and discourse’. In Marc Janse, ed.: Productivity and Creativity: Studies in General and Descriptive Linguistics in Honor of E.M. Uhlenbeck (Trends in Linguistics. Studies and Monographs 116), 421–432. Berlin: Mouton de Gruyter.
- Comrie, 1999, ‘Haruai numerals and their implications for the history and typology of numeral systems’. In Jadranka Gvozdanović, ed.: Numeral Types and Changes Worldwide (Trends in Linguistics, Studies and Monographs 118), 95–111. Berlin: Mouton de Gruyter.
- Comrie, 2001, ‘Haruai kin terms’. In Andrew Pawley, Malcolm Ross, and Darrell Tryon, eds.: The Boy from Bundaberg: Studies in Melanesian Linguistics in Honour of Tom Dutton, 89–95. Canberra: Pacific Linguistics.
