= Changriwa language =

Yuat language of Papua New Guinea

Changriwa
- Native to: Papua New Guinea
- Region: East Sepik Province
- Native speakers: 690 (2003)
- Language family: Yuat: Changriwa

Language codes
- ISO 639-3: cga
- Glottolog: chan1319
- ELP: Changriwa
- Coordinates: 4.334902°S 143.748355°E

Changriwa is a Yuat language of Papua New Guinea. It is spoken in Changriwa village (4.334902°S 143.748355°E), Angoram/Middle Sepik Rural LLG, East Sepik Province.
