= Bride price =

Money or other form of wealth paid by a groom or his family to the family of the bride

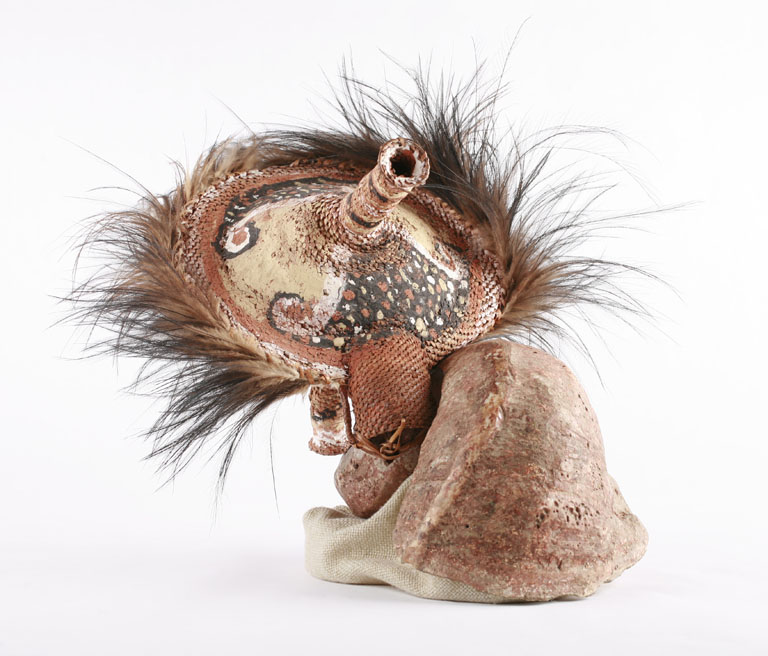
A Papuan bride dowry basket piece from the early 20th century. In the collection of The Children's Museum of Indianapolis.

Bride price, bride-dowry, bride-wealth, bride service or bride token, is money, property, or other form of wealth paid by a groom or his family to the woman or the family of the woman he will be married to or is just about to marry. Bride dowry is equivalent to dowry paid to the groom in some cultures, or used by the bride to help establish the new household, and dower, which is property settled on the bride herself by the groom at the time of marriage. Some cultures may practice both simultaneously. Many cultures practiced bride dowry prior to existing records.

The tradition of giving bride price is practiced in many East Asian countries, the Middle East, parts of Africa and in some Pacific Island societies, notably those in Melanesia. The amount changing hands may range from a token to continue the traditional ritual, to many thousands of US dollars in some marriages in Thailand, and as much as $100,000 in exceptionally large bride price in parts of Papua New Guinea where bride dowry is customary.

== Function ==
Bridewealth is commonly paid in a currency that is not generally used for other types of exchange. According to French anthropologist Philippe Rospabé, its payment does therefore not entail the purchase of a woman, as was thought in the early twentieth century. Instead, it is a purely symbolic gesture acknowledging (but never paying off) the husband's permanent debt to the wife's parents.

Dowries exist in societies where capital is more valuable than manual labor. For instance, in Medieval Europe, the family of a bride-to-be was compelled to offer a dowry — land, cattle and money — to the family of the husband-to-be. The custom of dowry is also commonly practiced in much of South Asia (see Dowry system in India).

Bridewealth exists in societies where manual labor is more important than capital. In Sub-Saharan Africa where land was abundant and there were few or no domesticated animals, manual labor was more valuable than capital, and therefore bridewealth dominated.

An evolutionary psychology explanation for dowry and bride price is that bride price is common in polygynous societies which have a relative scarcity of available women. In monogamous societies where women have little personal wealth, dowry is instead common since there is a relative scarcity of wealthy men who can choose from many potential women when marrying.

== Historical usage ==
=== Mesopotamia ===
The Babylonian Code of Hammurabi mentions bride price in various laws as an established custom. It is not the payment of the bride price that is prescribed, but the regulation of various aspects:

- If a man marry a woman and she bear him no sons; if then this woman die, if the "purchase price" which he had paid into the house of his father-in-law is repaid to him, her husband shall have no claim upon the dowry of this woman; it belongs to her father's house.
- If his father-in-law do not pay back to him the amount of the "purchase price" he may subtract the amount of the "Purchase price" from the dowry, and then pay the remainder to her father's house.

=== Jewish tradition ===
The Torah discusses the practice of paying a bride price to the father of a virgin at Shemot (Exodus) 22:16-17 (JPS translation): "And if a man entice a virgin that is not betrothed, and lie with her, he shall surely pay a dowry for her to be his wife. If her father utterly refuse to give her unto him, he shall pay money according to the dowry of virgins." Devarim (Deuteronomy) 22:28-29 similarly states, "If a man meets a virgin who is not betrothed, and seizes her and lies with her, and they are found, then the man who lay with her shall give to the father of the young woman fifty shekels of silver, and she shall be his wife, because he has violated her. He may not divorce her all his days."

Jewish law in ancient times insisted upon the betrothed couple signing a ketubah, a formal contract. The ketubah provided for an amount to be paid by the husband in the event he divorced his wife (i.e. if he gives her a get; women cannot divorce their husbands in orthodox Jewish law); or by his estate in the event of his death. The provision in the ketubah replaced the bride price tradition recited in the Torah, which was payable at the time of the marriage by the groom.

This innovation came about because the bride price created a major social problem: many young prospective husbands could not raise the amount at the time when they would normally be expected to marry. To enable these young men to marry, the rabbis (in effect) delayed the time that the amount would be payable, when they would be more likely to have the sum. The object — in either case — was financial protection for the wife should the husband die, divorce her or disappear. The only difference between the two systems was the timing of the payment.

In fact, the rabbis were so insistent on the bride having the "benefit of the ketubah" that some even described a marriage without one as being merely concubinage, because the bride would lack the benefit of the financial settlement in case of divorce or death of the husband; without which the woman and her children could become a burden on the community. However, the husband could refuse to pay if a divorce was on account of adultery by the wife.

To this day in traditional Jewish weddings, the groom gives the bride an object of value, such as a wedding ring, to fulfill the requirement in the ketubah. The object given must have a certain minimal value to satisfy the obligation but, modernly, the value is otherwise nominal and symbolic.

=== Ancient Greece ===
Some of the marriage settlements mentioned in the Iliad and Odyssey suggest that bride price was a custom of Homeric society. The language used for various marriage transactions, however, may blur distinctions between bride price and dowry, and a third practice called "indirect dowry," whereby the groom hands over property to the bride which is then used to establish the new household. "Homeric society" is a fictional construct involving legendary figures and deities, though drawing on the historical customs of various times and places in the Greek world. At the time when the Homeric epics were composed, "primitive" practices such as bride price and polygamy were no longer part of Greek society. Mentions of them preserve, if they have a historical basis at all, customs dating from the Age of Migrations (c. 1200–1000 BC) and the two centuries following.

In the Iliad, Agamemnon promises Achilles that he can take a bride without paying the bride price (Greek hednon), instead receiving a dowry (pherne). In the Odyssey, the least arguable references to bride price are in the marriage settlements for Ctimene, the sister of Odysseus; Pero, the daughter of Neleus, who demanded cattle for her; and the goddess Aphrodite herself, whose husband Hephaestus threatens to make her father Zeus return the bride price given for her, because she was adulterous. It is possible that the Homeric "bride price" is part of a reciprocal exchange of gifts between the prospective husband and the bride's father, but while gift exchange is a fundamental practice of aristocratic friendship and hospitality, it occurs rarely, if at all, in connection with marriage arrangements.

=== Islamic law ===
Islamic law commands a groom to give the bride a gift called a Mahr prior to the consummation of the marriage. A mahr differs from the standard bride-price in that it is paid not to the family of the bride, but to the wife to keep for herself; it is thus more accurately described as a dower. In the Qur'an, it is mentioned in chapter 4, An-Nisa, verse 4 as follows:

And give to the women (whom you marry) their Mahr [obligatory bridal money given by the husband to his wife at the time of marriage] with a good heart; but if they, of their own good pleasure, remit any part of it to you, take it and enjoy it without fear of any harm (as Allah has made it lawful).

=== Morning gifts ===
Morning gifts, which might be arranged by the bride's father rather than the bride, are given to the bride herself. The name derives from the Germanic tribal custom of giving them the morning after the wedding night. The woman might have control of this morning gift during the lifetime of her husband, but is entitled to it when widowed. If the amount of her inheritance is settled by law rather than agreement, it may be called dower. Depending on legal systems and the exact arrangement, she may not be entitled to dispose of it after her death, and may lose the property if she remarries. Morning gifts were preserved for many centuries in morganatic marriage, a union where the wife's inferior social status was held to prohibit her children from inheriting a noble's titles or estates. In this case, the morning gift would support the wife and children. Another legal provision for widowhood was jointure, in which property, often land, would be held in joint tenancy, so that it would automatically go to the widow on her husband's death.

== Contemporary ==
=== Africa ===
In parts of Africa, a traditional marriage ceremony depends on payment of a bride price to be valid. In Sub-Saharan Africa, bride price must be paid first in order for the couple to get permission to marry in church or in other civil ceremonies, or the marriage is not considered valid by the bride's family. The amount can vary from a token to a great sum, real estate and other values. Lobolo (or Lobola, sometimes also known as Roora) is the same tradition in most cultures in Southern Africa Xhosa, Shona, Venda, Zulu, Ndebele etc. The amount includes a few to several head of cattle, goats and a sum of money depending on the family. The cattle and goats constitute an integral part of the traditional marriage for ceremonial purposes during and after the original marriage ceremony.

In some societies, marriage is delayed until all payments are made. If the wedding occurs before all payments are made, the status is left ambiguous. The bride price tradition can have destructive effects when young men don't have the means to marry. In strife-torn South Sudan, Kenya many young men steal cattle for this reason, often risking their lives.

=== Asia ===
==== Western Asia ====
Assyrians, who are indigenous people of Western Asia, commonly practice the bride price (niqda) custom. The tradition would involve the bridegroom's family paying to the father of the bride. The amount of money of the niqda is reached by negotiation between groups of people from both families. The social state of the groom's family influences the amount of the bridewealth that ought to be paid. When the matter is settled to the contentment of both menages, the groom's father may kiss the hand of the bride's father to express his chivalrous regard and gratitude. These situations are usually filmed and incorporated within the wedding video. Folk music and dancing is accompanied after the payment is done, which usually happens on the doorstep, before the bride leaves her home with her escort (usually a male family member who would then walk her into the church).

==== Central Asia ====
In many parts of Central Asia nowadays, bride price is mostly symbolic. Various names for it in Central Asia include Kazakh: қалыңмал [qaləɴmal], Kyrgyz: калың [qɑlɯ́ŋ], Uzbek: qalin [qalɨn], and Russian: калым [kɐˈɫɨm]. It is also common in Uzbekistan and Turkmenistan. The price may range from a small sum of money or a single piece of livestock to what amounts to a herd of livestock, depending on local traditions and the expectations and agreements of the families involved. The tradition is upheld in Afghanistan. A "dark distortion" of it involved a 6-year-old daughter of an Afghan refugee from Helmand Province in a Kabul refugee camp, who was to be married to the son of the money lender who provided with the girl's father $2500 so the man could pay medical bills. According to anthropologist Deniz Kandiyoti, the practice increased after the fall of the Taliban.

==== Thailand ====
In Thailand, bride price—sin sod (Thai: สินสอด, pronounced [sĭn sòt] and often erroneously referred to by the English term "dowry") is common in both Thai-Thai and Thai-foreign marriages. The bride price may range from nothing—if the woman is divorced, has a child fathered by another man, or is widely known to have had premarital relations with men—to tens of millions of Thai baht (US$300,000 or ~9,600,000 THB) for a woman of high social standing, a beauty queen, or a highly educated woman. The bride price in Thailand is paid at the engagement ceremony, and consists of three elements: cash, Thai (96.5 percent pure) gold, and the more recent Western tradition of a diamond ring. The most commonly stated rationale for the bride price in Thailand is that it allows the groom to demonstrate that he has enough financial resources to support the bride (and possibly her family) after the wedding. In many cases, especially when the amount is large, the parents of a Thai bride will return all or part of the bride price to the couple in the form of a wedding gift following the engagement ceremony.

It is also practised by Muslims in Thailand and is called Mahr.

==== Kachin ====
In Kachin society they have the system of Mayu and Dama. "Mayu" means a group of people who give woman and "Dama" means a group of people who take woman. The “bride wealth” system is extremely important for kinship system in Kachin society and has been used for centuries. The purpose of giving "bride wealth" is to honor the wife giver "Mayu" and to create a strong relationship. The exact details of the “bride wealth” system vary by time and place. In Kachin society, bride wealth is required to be given by wife taker “Dama” to wife giver “Mayu.” Kachin ancestors thought that if wife takers “Dama” gave a large bride price to wife giver “Mayu”; it meant that they honored the bride and her family, and no one would look down on the groom and bride.

==== China ====
In traditional Chinese culture, an auspicious date is selected to ti qin (simplified Chinese: 提亲; traditional Chinese: 提親; lit. 'propose marriage'), where both families will meet to discuss the amount of the bride price (聘金; pìn jīn) demanded, among other things. Several weeks before the actual wedding, the ritual of guo da li (过大礼; 過大禮; 'going through the great ceremony') takes place (on an auspicious date). The groom and a matchmaker will visit the bride's family bearing gifts like wedding cakes, sweetmeats and jewelry, as well as the bride price. On the actual wedding day, the bride's family will return a portion of the bride price (sometimes in the form of dowry) and a set of gifts as a goodwill gesture.

Bride prices varies by eras, for instance during the Republican era, bride prices were usually in a form of a sack of rice or wheat. However bride prices were sent in secret during the Cultural Revolution following a public discouragement on bride price, which was seen as a feudalist legacy. Since Deng's reform, bride prices vary from CN¥ 1,000,000 in famously money-centric Shanghai to as little as CN¥ 10,000. A house is often required along with the bride price (an apartment is acceptable, but rentals are not) and a car under both or only the bride's name, neither of which are counted toward the bride price itself. In some regions, the bride's family may demand other kinds of gifts, none counted toward the bride price itself. May 18 is a particularly auspicious day on which to pay the bride price and marry, as its Chinese wording is phonetically similar to "I will get rich". Bride prices are rising quickly in China, largely without documentation, but a definite verbal and cultural understanding of where bride prices are today. Gender inequality in China has increased competition for ever higher bride prices. Financial distress is an unacceptable and ignored justification for not paying the bride price. If the grooms' side cannot agree or pay, they or simply the groom himself must still pay a bride price, thus, borrowing from relatives is a popular if not required option to "save face". Inability to pay is cause for preventing a marriage which either side can equally recommend. Privately, families need bride prices due to China's lack of a social security net, and a one child policy which leaves parents with neither retirement funding nor caretaking if their only child is taken away, as brides typically move into the groom's residence upon marrying, as well as to test the groom's ability to marry by paying cash and emotionally giving up his resources to the bride. Publicly, families cite bride price as insurance in case the man abandons or divorces the wife and that the bride price creates goodwill between families. The groom's side should pay more than what the bride's side has demanded to "save face". Amounts preferably follow the usual red envelope conventions though the sum is far more important. Attempts to tackle skyrocketing bride prices were also done by the Ministry of Civil Affairs by implementing marriage reforms, with involves capping the maximum amount of bride price which was implemented by trial in several regions, notably Chengdu, Guangzhou and Shenyang, apart from the ruling from the Supreme People's Court dated 17 January 2024 regarding the prohibition of demanding property under the name of marriage, which includes bride price that allows cases for reimbursement.

Changing patterns in the betrothal and marriage process in some rural villages of modern China can be represented as the following stages:

1. Ti qin 提亲, "propose a marriage";
2. He tian ming 和天命, "Accord with Heaven's mandate" (i.e. find a ritually auspicious day);
3. Jian mian 见面, "looking in the face", i.e. meeting;
4. Ding hun 订婚, "being betrothed";
5. Yao ri zi 要日子, "asking the wifegivers the date of the wedding"; and
6. Jie xin ren 接新人, "transferring the bride".

It is also practised by Uyghurs, among whom it is called Mahr.

==== Indian subcontinent ====
It is still practised by Muslims in India, Pakistan and Bangladesh and is called Mahr. In North East India, notably in Assam (the indigenous Assamese ethnic groups) an amount or token of bride price was and is still given in various forms. In some parts of Indian state of Gujarat, bride price is rather prevalent, resulting from the fact that there are lesser number of girls than boys in the society.

==== Myanmar ====
It is still practised by Muslims, known as Rohingyas in Myanmar, especially in Rakhine State and is called Mahr.

== Determinants of bride price ==
=== Education ===
Economic models suggest that in societies where bride price is practiced, parents may have stronger incentives to educate daughters, since higher education increases the amount of bride price received at marriage.

A landmark empirical study by Ashraf, Bau, Nunn, and Voena (2020) analyzed nationwide school construction programs in Indonesia and Zambia. They found that education policies had markedly different impacts depending on the presence of bride price customs. In Indonesia, completing primary school increased the bride price payment by approximately 58%, while completing junior secondary and college education raised it by 67% and 86%, respectively. These estimates suggest that the return to parents from educating their daughters could be as high as 14-38% of one year of household consumption.

School construction magnified these effects. Adding one new school per 1,000 children in Indonesia raised female primary school completion rates by 2.5 percentage points among bride price groups, but had no detectable effect in non–bride price groups. In Zambia, building one additional school per square kilometer increased girls’ completion rates by 4.2 percentage points in bride price groups, again with no effect among others.

The researchers also showed that female enrollment rates were consistently higher among bride price groups: 4.1-4.9 percentage points higher in Indonesia and 1.2-2.1 percentage points higher in Zambia, relative to non–bride price groups. These findings suggest that traditional marriage customs can enhance the responsiveness of households to education policies, and that this effect applies only to daughters, not to sons.

=== Marriage age ===
Age has been recognized as a key demographic variable affecting the level of bride price. One study, conducted in a region of Tanzania using the Kagera Health and Development Survey (2004–2010), showed that average payments were lower for marriages occurring at or before age 18 (around 68,000 Tanzanian shillings, or US$29.50), compared to over 104,000 shillings (US$45) for marriages above 18.

Regression analysis confirmed a non-linear relationship: bride price values rise through the late teenage years and peak around the early twenties, after which they gradually decline. This pattern suggests that while very early marriages yield smaller transfers, the payments do not increase indefinitely with age, but instead follow an inverted-U shape.

=== Other factors ===
Apart from education and age, various social and economic conditions have been found to affect bride price practices. An early empirical study by Papps (1983), based on household survey data from a Palestinian village, applied econometric analysis to explain variation in bride price payments.

The analysis identified several determinants:

- Kinship: Bride price tends to increase when the bride and groom are less closely related. Marrying outside the extended family or village raised payments, as children were considered to “leave” the bride’s family. Each additional degree of kinship distance was associated with about £30 higher bride price.
- Fertility: Higher maternal fertility was unexpectedly linked to lower bride price, since children were viewed as a public good within the family, reducing the marginal value of additional births.
- Marital history: Virgins commanded the highest bride prices, while widows and divorcees received significantly less. Ethnographic reports suggested that a widow’s bride price could be around half that of a virgin.
- Time and inflation: Bride price payments rose over successive generations, with estimates showing each new cohort of grooms paid on average £26 more, reflecting both inflation and intergenerational trends.
- Clan: Payments also varied by clan. For instance, the Rabayca clan, reputed to treat wives more kindly, was associated with significantly lower bride prices (about £54 less).

== See also ==
- Bride services
- Dowry
