= Yuat languages =

Language family spoken in Papua New Guinea

Yuat
- Middle Yuat River
- Geographic distribution: Yuat River area, East Sepik Province, Papua New Guinea
- Linguistic classification: One of the world's primary language families
- Subdivisions: Changriwa; Mekmek; Kyenele; Biwat; Bun

Language codes
- Glottolog: yuat1252

The Yuat languages are an independent family of five Papuan languages spoken along the Yuat River in East Sepik Province, Papua New Guinea. They are an independent family in the classification of Malcolm Ross, but are included in Stephen Wurm's Sepik–Ramu proposal. However, Foley and Ross could find no lexical or morphological evidence that they are related to the Sepik or Ramu languages.

It is named after the Yuat River of northern Papua New Guinea. Yuat languages are spoken mostly in Yuat Rural LLG of East Sepik Province.

== Languages ==
The Yuat languages proper are:

- Changriwa
- Mekmek
- Kyenele (Miyak)
- Biwat (Mundugumor)
- Bun

== Classification ==
Foley (2018) provides the following classification.

Yuat family

- Changriwa
- Mekmek
- Miyak; Bun, Mundukumo (Biwat)

Changriwa and Mekmek are attested only by short words, and are tentatively grouped as separate branches by Foley (2018: 226) due to scanty evidence.

== Pronouns ==
The pronouns Ross (2005) reconstructs for proto-Yuat are:

I	*ŋun	we	*amba
thou	*ndi	you	*mba
s/he	*wu	they	?

Mundukumo and Miyak pronouns are:

person	Mundukumo	Miyak
1SG	ŋə	ŋə
2SG	də	də
3SG	u	u
1EXCL	i	ni
1INCL	abə	aba
2PL	ya	be
3PL	wa	vara

== Vocabulary comparison ==
The following basic vocabulary words are from Davies & Comrie (1985), as cited in the Trans-New Guinea database.

The words cited constitute translation equivalents, whether they are cognate (e.g. ŋkaᵐbaᵐgat∘, ŋgambaŋ for “leg”) or not (e.g. fufuimaye, ɸə'ziru for “hair”).

gloss	Biwat	Kyenele (Kyaimbarang dialect)	Kyenele (Miyak dialect)
head	fop; fopeh	ϕɔp∘	ᵽop
hair	fufuimaivi; fufuimaye	ϕə'ziru	fusibɩľu
ear	tuanhe; tundu	'twan	tandu
eye	siketeh; sipta	'ɕikɯ	sɩpʰala
nose	gerekeh; ŋerek	'ŋəŋərɩ	nʌnɛlɩŋ
tooth	andu; andusivahe	'ŋandu	ŋandu
tongue	be; behe	'mbᴶe	mpe
leg	gambang; geambangeh	ŋkaᵐbaᵐgat∘	ŋgambaŋ
louse	uta; utaeh	uta	wututʰoma
dog	ken; kenhe	kᴶɛn	gɛn
pig	vereh; vre	βɛrɩ	ƀeǏe
bird	kaok; kaokhek	hɔpᴶɛ	wanma
egg	momoateh; mumuat	'majmuma	wanmuma
blood	amberaeh; ambra	ambara	ambala
bone	amfuva; amfuvaheh	amϕu	amᵽuwa
skin	gamfuin; iaveteh	'vɨza	nᵽɩsakʰ
breast	meru; meruhe	mi	miřu
tree	mung; mungeh	mu	mï
man	foakpa; fuakpahe	aβɨd	aƀɷt
woman	arepa; arepahe	mᴶe	miandu
sun	va; vaeh	βanma	ƀanma
moon	mumere; mumereh	'gəŋat∘	ŋgɨŋat
water	mam; mumeh	'maŋam	maŋam
fire	mehen; men	mɨn	mɨn
stone	ghateh; yiak	mɨndəm	mɨndɩm
road, path	maikua; miakuahe	maj	mayt
name	vu'geh; vuŋ	wuŋ	
eat	ueh jiveh; u-u give	ɕɛnɕɛn	tšɛntšɛntšuƀa
one	nategeh; natek	ŋajkə	ŋaykʰʌkʰ
two	arauu; aravueh	aɽawi	aǏawin

== Grammar ==
Yuat languages distinguish inclusive and exclusive first person pronouns, a feature not found in most other Papuan languages. This typological feature has also diffused from Yuat into the Grass languages, which are spoken contiguously to the Yuat languages.

Yuat grammar and phonology are similar to those of the neighboring Ramu languages. Yuat verbal morphology is relatively simple.

Yuat languages are accusative, unlike many other Papuan languages, e.g., Trans New Guinea, East Cenderawasih Bay, Lakes Plain, South Bougainville, which are all ergative.

Word order in Yuat languages, like in the Yawa languages, is rigidly SOV, whereas in many other Papuan families, OSV word order is often permitted (as long as the verb is final).

== See also ==
- Maramba language, a possibly spurious language often listed as Yuat.
- Upper Yuat languages
