= Yuat Rural LLG =

Local-level government in Papua New Guinea

- Location within Papua New Guinea
- Coordinates: 4.405782°S 143.866251°E
- Country: Papua New Guinea
- Province: East Sepik Province
- Time zone: UTC+10 (AEST)

Yuat Rural LLG is a local-level government (LLG) of East Sepik Province, Papua New Guinea. It is named after the Yuat River. The Yuat languages are spoken in this LLG.

== Wards ==
- 01. Kundima
- 02. Aragunum
- 03. Saparu
- 04. Kinakaten
- 05. Akuran
- 06. Branda
- 07. Biwat (Mundugumor language and Bun language speakers)
- 08. Muruat
- 09. Dimiri
- 10. Bun (Bun language speakers?)
- 11. Sipisipi
- 12. Girin (Kyenele language speakers)
- 13. Asangumut
- 14. Mensuat
- 15. Yambimbit
- 16. Kambambit
- 17. Nadvari
- 18. Andafugun
- 19. Yambaidog
- 20. Olimolo
- 21. Itipino

== See also ==
- Yuat languages
- Upper Yuat KIANGING languages
