= Mekmek language =

Yuat language of Papua New Guinea

Mekmek
- Native to: Papua New Guinea
- Region: East Sepik Province
- Native speakers: (1,400 cited 2000 census)
- Language family: Yuat: Mekmek

Language codes
- ISO 639-3: mvk
- Glottolog: mekm1240
- ELP: Mekmek

Mekmek is a Yuat language of the East Sepik Province of Papua New Guinea. It has 1,400 total speakers, according to the 2000 Papua New Guinea census.
