= Dowry =

Payment by one family of a marriage to the other family

A dowry (or marriage portion) is a payment such as land, property, money, livestock, or a commercial asset that is paid by the bride's (woman's) family to the groom (man) or his family at the time of marriage.

Dowry contrasts with the related concepts of bride price and dower. While bride price or bride service is a payment by the groom, or his family, to the bride, or her family, dowry is the wealth transferred from the bride, or her family, to the groom, or his family. Similarly, dower is the property settled on the bride herself, by the groom at the time of marriage, and which remains under her ownership and control.

Traditional dowry is an ancient custom that is mentioned in some of the earliest writings, and its existence may well predate records of it. Dowries continue to be expected and demanded as a condition to accept a marriage proposal in some parts of the world, mainly in parts of Asia. The custom of dowry is most common in strongly patrilineal cultures that expect women to reside with or near their husband's family (patrilocality). Dowries have long histories in Europe, South Asia, Africa, and other parts of the world.

== Definition ==
A dowry is the transfer of parental property to a daughter at her marriage (i.e. "inter vivos") rather than at the owner's death (mortis causa). A dowry establishes a type of conjugal fund, the nature of which may vary widely. This fund may provide an element of financial security in widowhood or against a negligent husband, and may eventually go to provide for her children. Dowries may also go toward establishing a marital household, and therefore might include furnishings such as linens and furniture.

Locally, dowry or trousseau is called jahez in Urdu, jahizie (also means prize not specifically dowry) in Persian and Arabic; dahej in Hindi, dāj in Punjabi, daijo in Nepali, çeyiz in Turkish, joutuk in Bengali, jiazhuang in Mandarin, varadhachanai in Tamil, khatnam in Telugu, streedhanam in Malayalam, miraz in Serbo-Croatian and in various parts of Africa is known as serotwana, idana, saduquat or mugtaf.

== Origins ==
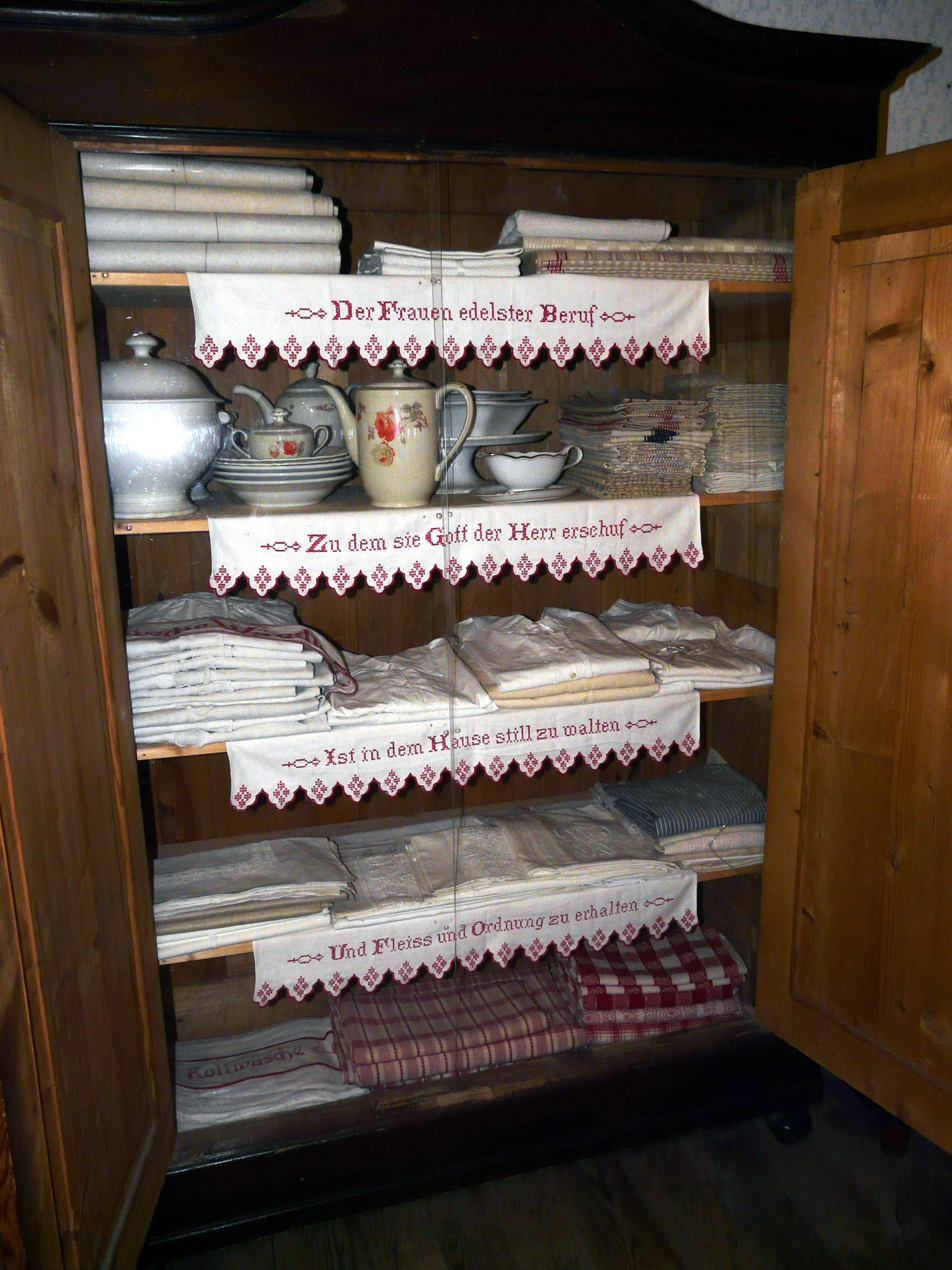
Aussteuerschrank – a dowry cabinet, currently in a German museum in Hauenstein.

Anthropologist Jack Goody's comparative study of dowry systems around the world using the Ethnographic Atlas demonstrated that dowry is a form of inheritance found in the broad swath of Eurasian societies from Japan to Ireland that practice "diverging devolution", i.e., that transmit property to children regardless of sex. This practice differs from the majority of Sub-Saharan African societies that practice "homogenous inheritance" in which property is transmitted only to children of the same sex as the property holder. These latter African societies are characterized by the transmission of the "bride price", the money, goods or property given by the groom or his family to the parents of the bride (not the bride herself).

Goody has demonstrated a historical correlation between the practices of "diverging devolution" (dowry) and the development of intensive plough agriculture on the one hand, and homogeneous inheritance (brideprice) and extensive hoe agriculture on the other. Drawing on the work of Ester Boserup, Goody notes that the sexual division of labour varies in intensive plough agriculture and extensive shifting horticulture. In sparsely populated regions where shifting cultivation takes place, most of the work is done by women. These are the societies that give brideprice. Boserup further associates shifting horticulture with the practice of polygamy, and hence bridewealth is paid as a compensation to her family for the loss of her labour. In plough agriculture farming is largely men's work; this is where dowry is given. In contrast, plough agriculture is associated with private property and marriage tends to be monogamous, to keep the property within the nuclear family. Close family are the preferred marriage partners so as to keep property within the group.

There is a scholarly debate on Goody's theory. Sylvia Yanagisako argues, for example, that there are a number of societies including parts of Japan, Southern Italy, and China, that do not support Goody's claim that dowry is a form of female inheritance of male property. She notes that Goody's is an evolutionary model in which these historical variables may not be the decisive factors today. Susan Mann argues, in contrast, with examples where even in late Imperial China, dowry was a form of female inheritance.

Stanley J. Tambiah later argued that Goody's overall thesis remained pertinent in North India, although it required modification to meet local circumstances. He points out that dowry in North India is only partially used as a bride's conjugal fund, and that a large part goes directly to the groom's joint family. This would initially seem to discount Goody's model, except that in North India, the joint family is composed of the groom's parents, his married brothers and unmarried sisters, and their third generation children. This joint family controlled this part of the dowry, which they used to help fund their own daughter/sister's dowries. But when the parents die, and the joint family partitions, this jointly held wealth was then divided among the married sons, such that ultimately, the bride's dowry given to the joint family returned to her and her husband as their "conjugal fund."

Schlegel and Eloul expanded on Goody's model through further statistical analysis of the Ethnographic atlas. They argue that a major factor in determining the type of marriage transaction is the type of property controlled by the household. Bridewealth circulates property and women, and is typical of societies where property is limited. Dowry concentrates property and is found in property owning classes or commercial or landed pastoral peoples. When families give dowry, they not only ensure their daughter's economic security, they also "buy" the best possible husband for her, and son-in-law for themselves.

== Historical practices ==
=== Babylon ===
Even in the oldest available records, such as the Code of Hammurabi in ancient Babylon, the dowry is described as an already-existing custom. Daughters did not normally inherit any of her father's estate. Instead, with marriage, the bride got a dowry from her parents, which was intended to offer her as much lifetime security as her family could afford.

In Babylonia, both bride price and dowry auctions were practiced. However, bride price almost always became part of the dowry. According to Herodotus, auctions of maidens were held annually. The auctions began with the woman the auctioneer considered to be the most beautiful and progressed to the least. It was considered illegal to allow a daughter to be sold outside of the auction method. Attractive maidens were offered in an auction to determine the bride price to be paid by a swain, while in the case of maidens lacking attractivity a reverse auction was needed to determine the dowry to be paid to a swain. In case of divorce without reason, a man was required to give his wife the dowry she brought as well as the bride price the husband gave. The return of dowry could be disputed, if the divorce was for a reason allowed under Babylonian law.

A wife's dowry was administered by her husband as part of the family assets. He had no say, however, in its ultimate disposal; and legally, the dowry had to be kept separate for it was expected to support the wife and her children. The wife was entitled to her dowry at her husband's death. If she died childless, her dowry reverted to her family, that is her father if he was alive, otherwise her brothers. If she had sons, they would share it equally. Her dowry was inheritable only by her own children, not by her husband's children or by other women.

=== Ancient Greece ===
In archaic Greece, the usual practice was to give a bride price (hédnon (ἕδνον)). Dowries (pherné (φερνή)) were exchanged by the later classical period (5th century B.C). A husband had certain property rights in his wife's dowry. In addition, the wife might bring to the marriage property of her own, which was not included in the dowry and which was, as a result, hers alone. This property was "beyond the dowry" (Greek parapherna, the root of paraphernalia) and is referred to as paraphernal property or extra-dotal property.

A dowry may also have served as a form of protection for the wife against the possibility of ill treatment by her husband and his family, providing an incentive for the husband not to harm his wife. This would apply in cultures where a dowry was expected to be returned to the bride's family if she died soon after marrying.

In contemporary Greece, dowry was removed from family law through legal reforms in 1983.

=== Roman Empire ===
The Romans practiced dowry (dos). The dowry was property transferred by the bride, or on her behalf by anyone else, to the groom or groom's father, at their marriage. Dowry was a very common institution in Roman times, and it began out of a desire to get the bride's family to contribute a share of the costs involved in setting up a new household. Dowry was given for the purpose of assisting the husband in fulfilling the economic obligations or "burdens" involved in the bonds of marriage (onera matrimonii). All the property of the wife which was not dowry or was not a donatio propter nuptias ("gift because of [the] wedding," with nuptias plural as referring to each respective uniting of one partner with the other) continued to be her own property and was called parapherna. The dowry could include any form of property given or promised at the time of marriage, but only what remained after deducting the debts. Any person, not only a member of the bride's family, could donate property as dowry for the woman.

Two types of dowry were known—dos profectitia and dos adventitia. That dowry is profectitia which was given by the father or father's father of the bride. All other dowry is adventitia. Roman law also allowed for a species of dowry, called dos receptitia, which was given by some other person than the father or father of the bride's father, in consideration of marriage, but on the condition that it should be restored back to the dowry giver, on the death of the wife. The bride's family were expected to give a dowry when a girl married, and in proportion to their means. It was customary for the bride's family and friends to pay promised dowries in installments over three years, and some Romans won great praise by delivering the dowry in one lump sum.

=== Indian subcontinent ===
The practice of dowry in the Indian subcontinent is a controversial subject. Some scholars believe dowry was practiced in antiquity, but some do not. Historical eyewitness reports (discussed below) suggest dowry in ancient India was insignificant, and daughters had inheritance rights, which by custom were exercised at the time of her marriage. Documentary evidence suggests that at the beginning of 20th century, bridewealth, rather than dowry was the common custom, which often resulted in poor boys remaining unmarried.

Stanley J. Tambiah claims the ancient Code of Manu sanctioned dowry and bridewealth in ancient India (typically in Rohtak) and especially in Kadia families, but dowry was the more prestigious form and associated with the Brahmanic (priestly) caste. Bridewealth was restricted to the lower castes, who were not allowed to give dowry. He cites two studies from the early 20th century with data to suggest that this pattern of dowry in upper castes and bridewealth in lower castes persisted through the first half of the 20th century. However, it is more likely that marriages involved both reciprocal gifts between the two families, claims Tambiah, so that insofar as the groom's family gave the bridewealth, it tended to be given back as dowry to the bride as part of her conjugal estate.

Michael Witzel, in contrast, claims the ancient Indian literature suggests dowry practices were not significant during the Vedic period. Witzel also notes that women in ancient India had property inheritance rights either by appointment or when they had no brothers.

The findings of MacDonell and Keith are similar to Witzel, and differ from Tambiah; they cite ancient Indian literature suggesting bridewealth was paid even in brahma- and daiva-types of marriage associated with the Brahmanic (priestly) upper caste. Dowry was not infrequent, when the girl suffered from some bodily defect. Property rights for women increased in ancient India, suggest MacDonell and Keith, over the Epics era (200 BC – 700 AD). Kane claims ancient literature suggests bridewealth was paid only in the asura-type of marriage that was considered reprehensible and forbidden by Manu and other ancient Indian scribes. Lochtefeld suggests that religious duties listed by Manu and others, such as 'the bride be richly adorned to celebrate marriage' were ceremonial dress and jewelry along with gifts that were her property, not property demanded by or meant for the groom; Lochtefeld further notes that bridal adornment is not currently considered as dowry in most people's mind.

The above analysis by various scholars is based on interpreting verses of ancient Sanskrit scriptures from India, not eyewitness accounts. Available eyewitness observations from ancient India give a different picture. One of these are the eyewitness records from Alexander the Great's conquest (ca. 300 BC), as recorded by Arrian and Megasthenes. Arrian's first book mentions a lack of dowry,

They (these ancient Indian people) make their marriages accordance with this principle, for in selecting a bride they care nothing whether she has a dowry and a handsome fortune, but look only to her beauty and other advantages of the outward person.

— Arrian, The Invasion of India by Alexander the Great, 3rd century BC

Arrian's second book similarly notes,

They (Indians) marry without either giving or taking dowries, but the women as soon as they are marriageable are brought forward by their fathers in public, to be selected by the victor in wrestling or boxing or running or someone who excels in any other manly exercise.

— Arrian, Indika in Megasthenes and Arrian, 3rd century BC

The two sources suggest dowry was absent, or infrequent enough to be noticed by Arrian. About 1200 years after Arrian's visit, another eyewitness scholar visited India named Abū Rayḥān al-Bīrūnī, also known as Al-Biruni, or Alberonius in Latin. Al-Biruni was an Islamic era Persian scholar who went and lived in India for 16 years from 1017 CE. He translated many Indian texts into Arabic, as well as wrote a memoir on Indian culture and life he observed. Al-Biruni claimed,

The implements of the wedding rejoicings are brought forward. No gift (dower or dowry) is settled between them. The man gives only a present to the wife, as he thinks fit, and a marriage gift in advance, which he has no right to claim back, but the (proposed) wife may give it back to him of her own will (if she does not want to marry).

— Al-Biruni, Chapter on Matrimony in India, about 1035 AD

Al-Biruni further claims that a daughter, in 11th-century India, had legal right to inherit from her father, but only a fourth part of her brother. The daughter took this inheritance amount with her when she married, claimed Al-Biruni, and she had no rights to income from her parents after her marriage or to any additional inheritance after her father's death. If her father died before her marriage, her guardian would first pay off her father's debt, then allocate a fourth of the remaining wealth to her upkeep till she is ready to marry, and then give the rest to her to take with her into her married life.

=== China ===
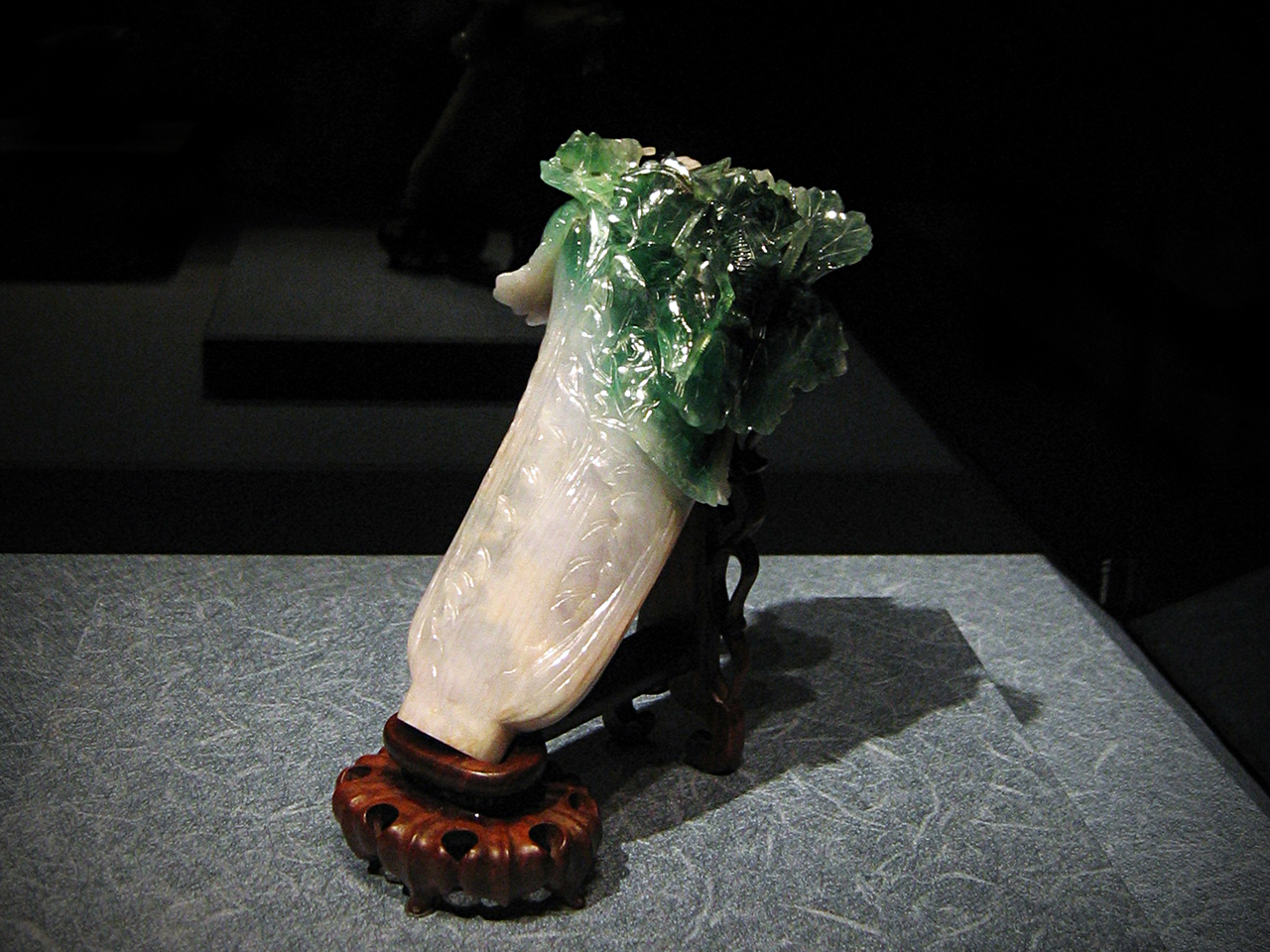
Jadeite Cabbage – Jin received it as part of her dowry for her wedding to Guangxu, in 1889; originally displayed in Forbidden City (Beijing), it is now in National Palace Museum (Taipei City).

Dowry was common in different historic periods of China and continued through the modern history. Locally called "嫁妝 (Jiàzhuāng), the dowry ranged from land, jewelry, money to a collection of clothing, sewing equipment and collection of household items. Mann and others find that dowry was a form of inheritance to daughters. In traditional China, the property owned by a family, if any, was earmarked for equal division or inheritance by sons only. Dowry was the only way assets were transferred to a daughter. It included immovable property such as land, and movable property like jewelry and fine clothing. The dowry she brought with her was typically sequestered from the property of her husband and other male members in a joint family. She would often sell this property for cash to overcome hard economic times or needs of her children and husband. In a few cases, she may transfer the property she brought as dowry to her daughter or daughter-in-law. Dowry assets once transferred in turn constituted separate wealth of the woman who received it (sifang qian, etc.). Often a woman who brought a large dowry was considered more virtuous in Chinese culture than one who didn't. In parts of China, both dowry and brideprice (pinjin) were practiced from ancient eras to the 20th century. Though throughout the history of China, the practice of using a brideprice has largely been used instead of dowries, but has slowly diminished in modern times.

=== Europe ===
Dowry was widely practiced in Europe until the early modern era. Folklorists often interpret the folk tale Cinderella as the competition between the stepmother and the stepdaughter for resources, which may include the need to provide a dowry. Gioachino Rossini's opera La Cenerentola makes this economic basis explicit: Don Magnifico wishes to make his own daughters' dowries larger, to attract a grander match, which is impossible if he must provide a third dowry.

Dowries were commonly given with the condition that the groom take the surname of his bride, in order to continue the family name. In the County of Bentheim in Lower Saxony, for instance, parents who had no sons might give a land dowry to their new son-in-law. It was commonly given with the condition that he take the surname of his bride, in order to continue the family name.

One common penalty for the kidnapping and rape of an unmarried woman was that the abductor or rapist had to provide the woman's dowry. Until the late 20th century this was sometimes called wreath money, or the breach of promise.

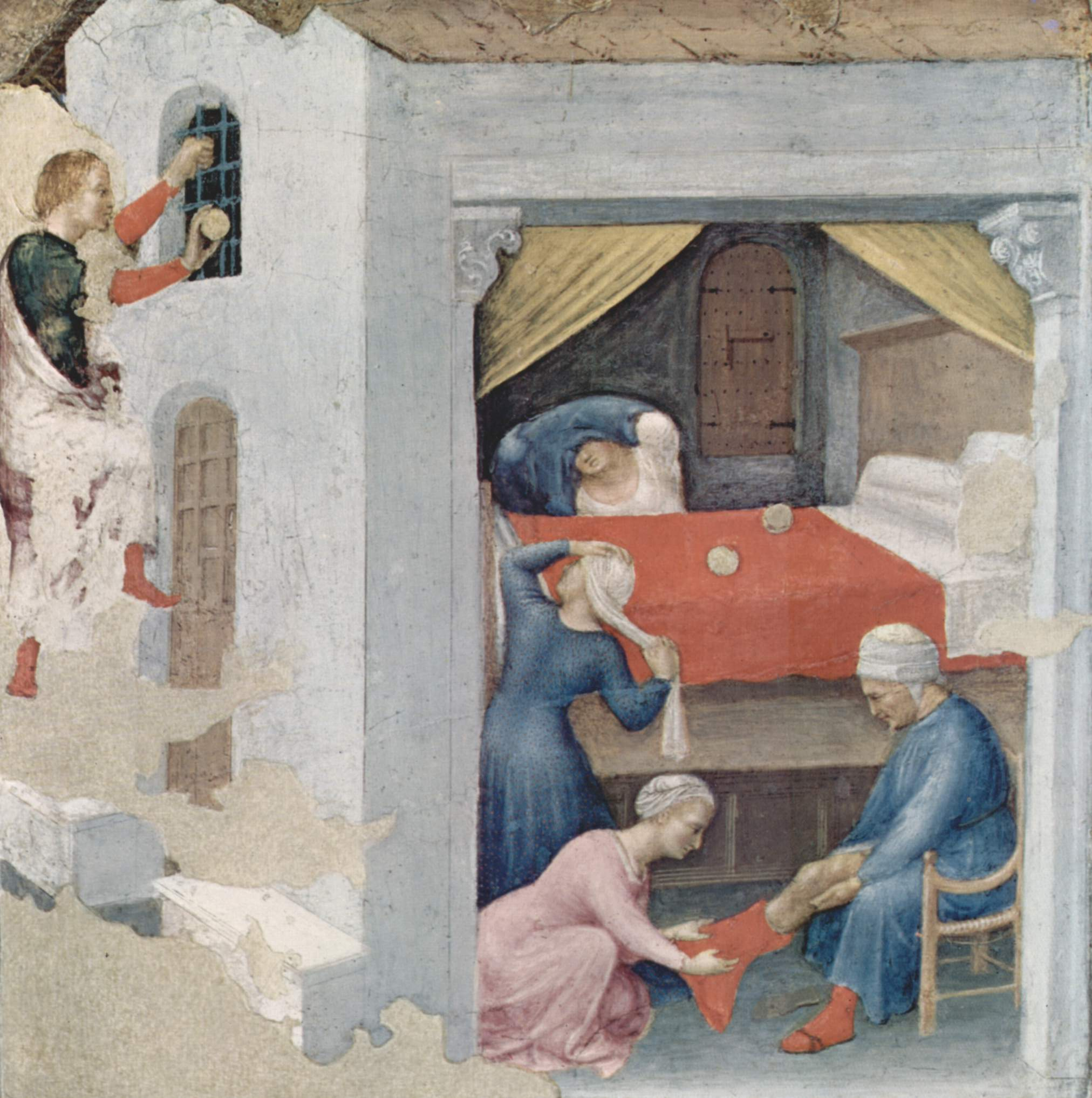
The dowry for the three virgins (Gentile da Fabriano, c. 1425, Pinacoteca Vaticana, Rome), part of the Saint Nicholas legend.

Providing dowries for poor women was regarded as a form of charity by wealthier parishioners. The custom of Christmas stockings springs from a legend of St Nicholas, in which he threw gold in the stockings of three poor sisters, thus providing for their dowries. St. Elizabeth of Portugal and St. Martin de Porres were particularly noted for providing such dowries, and the Archconfraternity of the Annunciation, a Roman charity dedicated to providing dowries, received the entire estate of Pope Urban VII. In 1425, the Republic of Florence created a public fund, called the Monte delle doti, to provide dowries to Florentine brides.

Vast inheritances were standard as dowries for aristocratic and royal brides in Europe during the Middle Ages. The Portuguese crown gave two cities in India and Morocco as dowry to the British Crown in 1661 when King Charles II of England married Catherine of Braganza, a princess of Portugal.

==== England ====
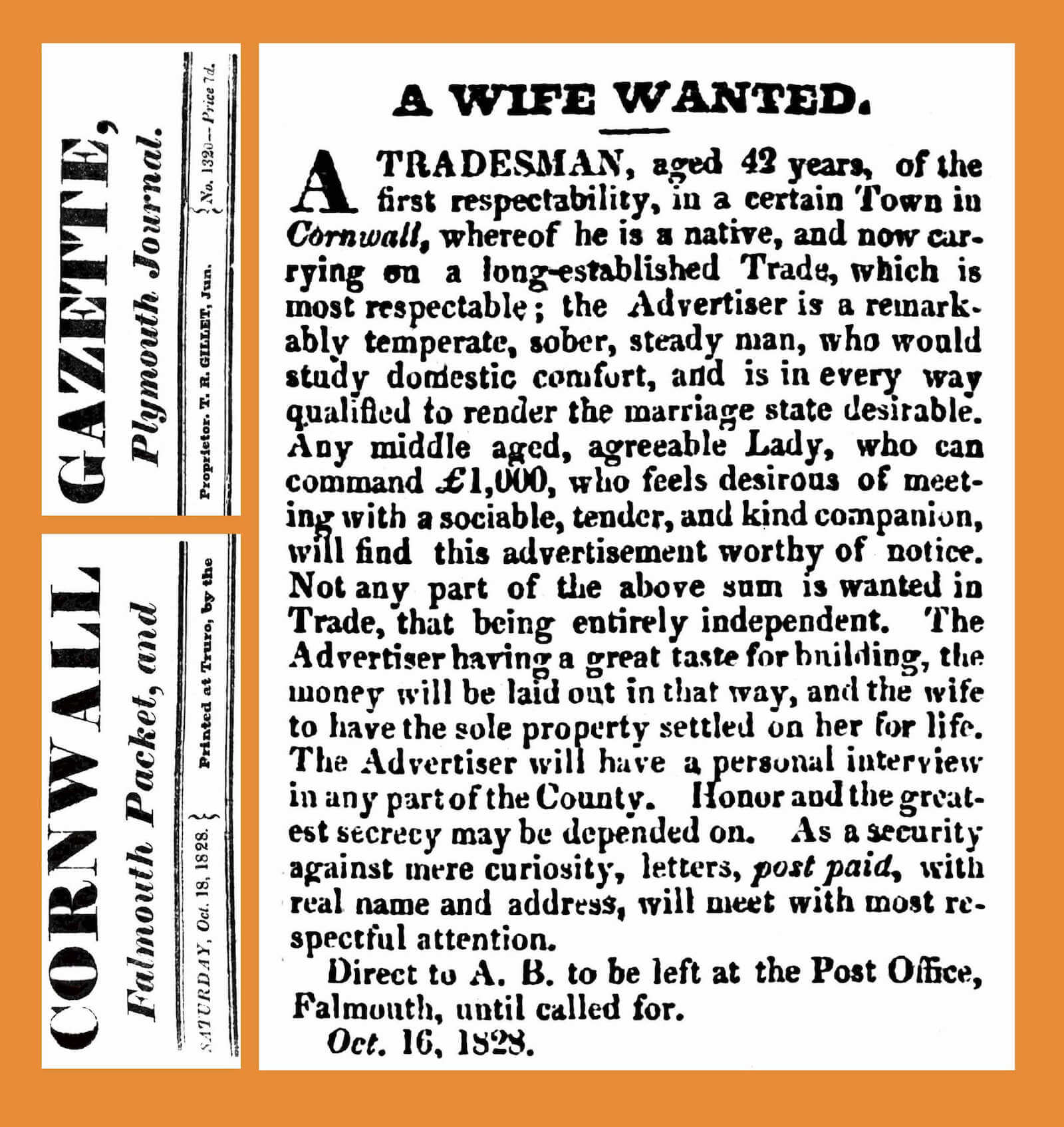
In an 1828 "Wife Wanted" advertisement in Cornwall, England, a man claiming a "great taste for building" pledges to apply a prospective wife's dowry-like £1,000+ to build property that will be "settled on her for life".

Dowry was used in England. However, the right of daughters to inherit and of women to hold property and other rights in their own name made it a different instrument than on the European continent. The Salic law, which required females to be disinherited and disenfranchised from land ownership, did not apply in England. Single women held many rights men did. The most famous example of this English female inheritance and agency right is perhaps Elizabeth I of England, who held all rights a male monarch did.

While single women held rights to hold property equivalent to those of men, marriage and married women were affected by the Norman Conquest changes to the law in the 12th century. Coverture was introduced to the common law in some jurisdictions, requiring property of a wife to be held in the husband's name, custody and control. The Normans also introduced the dowry in England replacing the earlier custom of the new husband giving a morning gift to his bride. At first the husband publicly gave^{[or received?]} the dowry at the church door at the wedding.

If the husband died first, which was frequent, there was a widows dowry of one third of the husband's lands at the time of his marriage; the income, and in some cases, the management, of the lands, was assigned to her for the rest of her life. This concept is included in the Great Charter, and along with the recognition of female inheritance and absence of the Salic law, and women, particularly single women, holding many rights equivalent to those men held, manifests English law differing fundamentally from the law of the European continent, especially the law of the Holy Roman Empire.

Thirteenth-century court records are filled with disputes over dowries, and the law became increasingly complex.

The English dowry system permitted most noble families to marry off their daughters and thereby gain extended kin and patronage ties. Marriageable daughters were a valuable commodity to ambitious fathers, and the English aristocracy sent few of their eligible daughters to convents.

Failure to provide a customary, or agreed-upon, dowry could cause a marriage to be called off. William Shakespeare made use of such an event in King Lear: one of Cordelia's suitors gives up his suit upon hearing that King Lear will give her no dowry. In Measure for Measure, Claudio and Juliet's premarital sex was brought about by their families' wrangling over dowry after the betrothal. Angelo's motive for forswearing his betrothal with Mariana was the loss of her dowry at sea.

In Victorian England, dowries were viewed by some members of the upper class as an early payment of the daughter's inheritance. In some instances, daughters who had not received their dowries were the only female heirs entitled to part of the estate when their parents died. If a couple died without children, a woman's dowry was often returned to her family.

Coverture never applied universally in Britain and was repealed in the 1800s. This effectively ended the concept of dowry as the property of a single woman was either retained by her after marriage or its income became marital property under joint control with a husband (not under his sole control as in coverture).

==== Russia ====
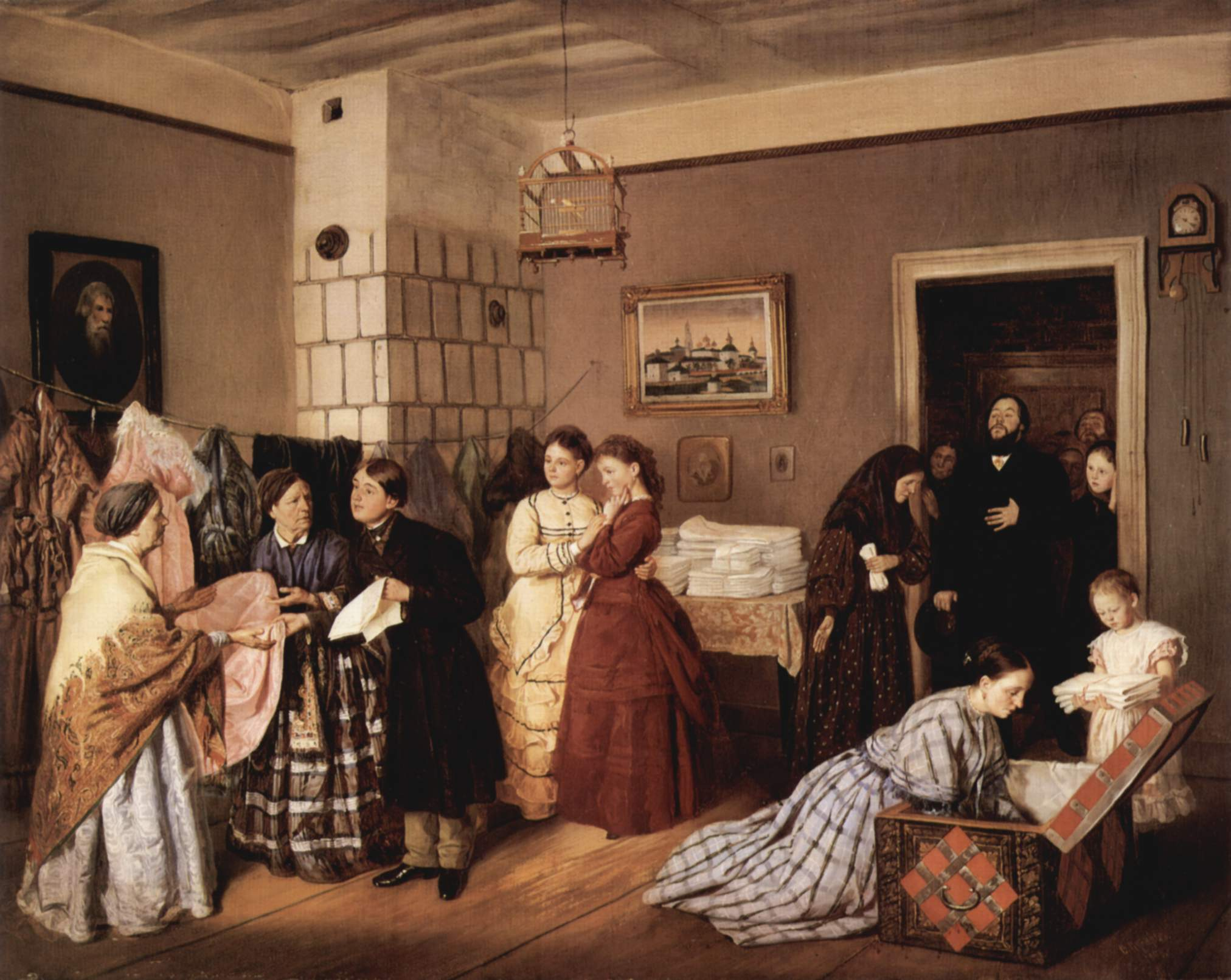
The Dowry by 19th-century Russian painter, Vasili Pukirev. Dowry was a common practice in Russia through the 19th century.

In some parts of Europe, especially Eastern Europe, land dowries were common.

The Domostroy, a Russian advice book of the 16th century for upper classes, includes advice to set aside property for purposes of a dowry, and use it to accumulate linens, clothing, and other things for it, rather than have to suddenly buy it all for the wedding; if the daughter should happen to die, the dowry should be used to give alms and for prayers for her soul, although some might be set aside for other daughters. In late Tsarist Russia the dowry originally consisted of clothing for the bride, linen, and bedding. Linen became less common, a fact blamed on poor flax harvest and girls being poor spinners, but emphasis was added to the finest of the clothing, and a money dowry was sometimes added, particularly if the bride was regarded as having some fault. Prospective in-laws, usually concerned mostly with her working ability, grew more concerned about a money dowry.

==== Romania ====
In Romania in the late 18th and early 19th centuries (1750–1830s) the exclusion of dowered girls from the family inheritance led to increased cohesion within the nuclear family. The wife's male relatives controlled the dowry but she retained sole ownership of the dowry and wedding gifts. Her relatives could prosecute the husband for squandering a dowry; wives gained some ability to leave an abusive marriage. The long-term result was a greater legal empowerment of women, while providing economic security to divorced women, widows, and children.

==== Nuns ====
In some cases, nuns were required to bring a dowry when joining a convent. At some times, such as Ancien Régime France, convents were also used by some parents as a place to put less attractive daughters, so that the more marriageable daughters could have larger dowries. Ancien Régime families that could not provide proper dowries also used the convents as places to put their daughters.

=== Americas ===
==== Indigenous cultures ====
According to one ethnographic study of indigenous cultures worldwide, around six percent of North American indigenous cultures practised reciprocal exchange, involving the giving of gifts between both the bride and groom's families. Among the tribes of the American Plains, a combination of dower and dowry was used. The groom would give a gift of horses to the bride's parents, while they in turn would give a gift to the groom. The exchange was somewhat reciprocal.

==== Mexico ====
Spanish colonists brought the dowry custom to Mexico. Spain's laws gave brides the right to control their dowry after marriage, contrary to the usual European practice of transferring the dowry to the control of the groom and his family. Women, in practice, often did maintain control over their dowry after marriage. The husband might be given funds from the dowry to invest for the mutual benefit of the couple and their children, but wives also often used funds from their dowries to operate their own businesses, as grocers, tavern keepers, and shop owners in urban areas. Dowries were a common custom in the early colonial years, but were passing out of use by the mid-18th century. By that time, less wealthy daughters were often marrying without any dowry.

==== New France ====
The French government made efforts to encourage marriage for the male soldiers and traders in New France by granting dowries to women willing to travel to the colony at Quebec. As the French crown provided dowries for many of the women persuaded to travel to New France for marriages and settlement there, they were known as filles du roi (daughters of the king).

Convents in Quebec, as in Europe, required a dowry from the parents of girls becoming nuns, much as the dowry was expected in the marriages of upper class brides. The Catholic Church and secular authorities intended for this requirement to regulate admission into religious communities. Girls without a dowry were often supported by benefactors, however, and occasionally convents lowered the sum required to enter the convent.

==== United States ====
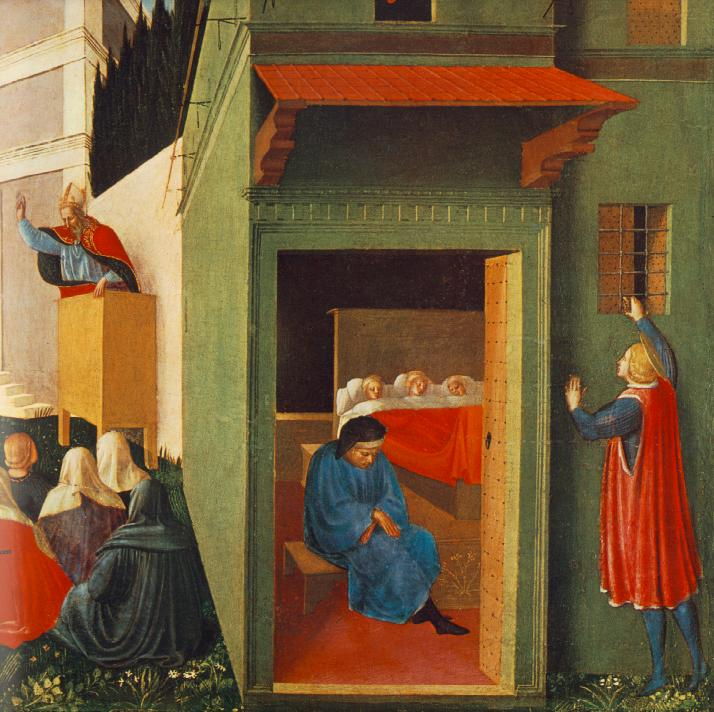
Fra Angelico's painting: The Story of St Nicholas Giving Dowry to Three Poor Girls. The 15th-century painting relates to the story of a poor man with three daughters. In those days a young woman's father had to offer prospective husbands a dowry. Without a dowry, a woman was unlikely to marry. Mysteriously, on three occasions, so goes the story, a bag of gold appeared in their home, for the dowries, courtesy of St Nicholas. Later, St Nicholas came to be known as Santa Claus.

The dowry was a custom brought to the United States by colonists from England and elsewhere in Europe. One legend tells how John Hull, the Master of the Mint in Boston, Massachusetts, and a wealthy man, determined the dowry for his daughter Hannah's marriage to Samuel Sewall. Hull is said to have set his 18-year-old daughter onto one side of the large scales in his warehouse. He piled shillings into the other side of the scale until he reached her weight in silver, and that was her dowry.

The daughters of wealthy 19th-century industrialists, who were able to inherit large amounts of money and property, were given "dowries" by their fathers to marry European aristocrats who held a title but had little wealth. The mutual exchange of title and wealth raised the status of both bride and groom. A very good example is the marriage of Consuelo Vanderbilt to Charles Spencer-Churchill, 9th Duke of Marlborough in 1895.

==== Brazil ====
The dowry was a custom brought to Brazil by Portuguese settlers. Colonial economics meant that families had a great stake in inheritances of land in particular. As in Europe, the eldest daughter was usually granted the largest dowry by her father. Variations were not unusual, however, as research has shown in São Paulo, 31% of fathers gave dowries of increasing size to the younger daughters, and 21% distributed dowries with no particular favour shown to birth order of the daughters. In addition to dowries, daughters could also be granted an inheritance from their father, a share of the legìtima. Inheritance laws were complex in colonial Brazil. According to Portuguese law, an estate was to be divided among children who had not already received a dowry. In the early colonial period, married daughters receiving a large dowry would refuse to accept a further inheritance after the death of their father. In the 18th century, as inheritances and dowries gradually became smaller, this custom disappeared. Daughters accepted a dowry, plus a legìtima. In this way, they folded their dowry back into the estate with the legìtima, called bringing the dowry à colação. The remaining third of the estate, the terça, was free for the father to divide as he wished among his heirs.

There were instances where a daughter was left to marry without a dowry, whereas her sisters were given dowries, an indication of paternal control over marriage choices. During the 18th century, as inheritances decreased in size, litigation among siblings became more common. Dowries could include land, a house in the city, cash, gold dust, gold bars, tools and machinery, cattle, or horses. By the 19th century, economic changes meant that men, typically merchants, brought more to the marriage materially, and the economic dynamics of marriage changed.

== Current practices ==
Dowry is a common practice in many parts of the world, especially in South Asia and several Middle East and North Africa countries. Dowry is most common in nations with inadequate male-biased inheritance laws and patrilineal societies, which expect women to live with or near their husband's family.

An unusual exception to the dowry custom in South Asia is found in Bhutan. The dowry system does not exist in Bhutan; inheritance is matrilineal, and daughters do not take their father's name at birth, nor their husband's name upon marriage. Rural land may be registered in a woman's name. Women own businesses, and both polyandry and polygyny are socially accepted, with polygyny being more prevalent. Sometimes a prospective groom will work in the bride's family's household to earn the right to marry her.

=== India ===
In India, dowry is called Dahez in Hindi. In far eastern parts of India, dowry is called Aaunnpot. Dowry is a payment of cash or gifts from the bride's family to the bridegroom's family upon arranged marriage. It may include cash, jewelry, electrical appliances, furniture, bedding, crockery, utensils, car and other household items that help the newlyweds set up their home.

In India, the dowry puts great financial strain on the bride's family. Payment of dowry is now prohibited under the Dowry Prohibition Act, 1961 in Indian civil law and subsequently by Sections 304B and 498a of the Indian Penal Code (IPC). Despite anti-dowry laws in India, it is still a common practice. Other laws attempting to address the problem include the Dowry and Bridal Gifts Restrictions Rules, 1976 and the Dowry Prohibition (Maintenance of Lists of Presents to the Bride and Bridegroom) Rules, 1985, which are intended to document gifts and provide complainants with stronger evidence in case prosecution for crimes against the bride occurs later.

Dowry in India is widespread among all religions. Over the years, the practice has evolved and expanded in terms of scope and outreach. For example, Indian Muslims call dowry as jahez, and it is classified into two categories: The first comprises some essential articles for the outfit of the bride as well as for conjugal life. The other is made up of valuable goods, clothes, jewelry, an amount of money for the groom's family, which is settled on after bargaining.

A 2026 study of rural India examined whether women's political representation affected marriage practices by using the reservation of village council leadership positions for women following the 73rd Constitutional Amendment as a source of variation in exposure to female pradhans. The study estimated that exposure to female pradhans delayed women's marriage by about 1.22 years and increased dowry payments by about 68%. It also found that employment among unmarried women increased by about 29% following the election of a female pradhan, while increases in dowry were concentrated in the most patriarchal states. The author argues that improved economic opportunities can encourage families to delay marriage, but that where the social costs of delayed or non-marriage are greater for women, this delay can increase pressure on brides' families to offer higher dowries.

Although Indian laws against dowries have been in effect for decades, they have been largely criticised as being ineffective. The practice of dowry deaths and murders continues to take place unchecked in many parts of India and this has further added to the concerns of enforcement. Dowry-murder persists. It is the killing of a wife for not bringing sufficient dowry to the marriage. It is the culmination of a series of prior domestic abuses by the husband's family.

Section 498A of the Indian Penal Code required the bridegroom and his family to be automatically arrested if a wife complains of dowry harassment. The law was widely abused and in 2014, the Supreme Court ruled that arrests can only be made with a magistrate's approval.

=== Bangladesh ===
The original custom in Bangladesh was the bride price, called pawn, where the groom's family makes a payment to the bride's parents. This has gradually been replaced by the dowry, called joutuk. This transition in customs began in the 1960s. By the early 21st century, the bride price has been supplanted by the dowry. Joutuk, sometimes spelled Joutukh, like elsewhere in South Asia, is a serious and growing problem in Bangladesh. Between 0.6 and 2.8 brides per year per 100,000 women are reported to die because of dowry-related violence.

Bangladesh has seen a rise in the expected size of dowries in recent decades, as its middle class has grown. Sociologist Sarah White has argued that the dowry is not compensation for weakness in women's economic contribution. Instead, its main function is now to support family advancement by mobilizing additional resources. It also demonstrates an ongoing commitment to the norms of masculine provision and protection. Dowries make women more valuable, which pushes against the background of widespread corruption and political and gender violence.

A negative factor is a rise in the rate of dowry deaths. In Bangladesh, dowry killings are more frequently done by stabbing or poison rather than burning. Dowry extortion is also a problem in Bangladesh. From January to October 2009, more than 3,413 complaints were made to the police in Bangladesh concerning beatings and other abuses related to dowries. One of the methods used by families who are unhappy with dowry includes acid throwing, in which concentrated acid is thrown on the bride's face to cause disfiguration and social isolation. From 1995 to 1998, 15 women reported dowry disputes as the motivation behind acid attacks, though that number may be low due to underreporting. Bangladesh is combating the problem with legislation largely copied from that of India. Laws prohibiting dowry in Bangladesh include Dowry Prohibition Act, 1980; Dowry Prohibition (Amendment) Ordinance, 1982; and Dowry Prohibition (Amendment) Ordinance, 1986.

Dowry Prohibition Act Clause 4 states that anyone demanding dowry from a person has committed a crime. The law does not have any clause stating punishment to misuse it. Therefore, the law is frequently used by women to harass in-laws and husbands.

=== Pakistan ===
In Pakistan, dowry is called Jahez . A 2014 Gallup survey in Pakistan found that 84% of Pakistanis believe that dowry plays either very important or somewhat important role in marriage, while 69% believed it is not possible for a girl to get married without a dowry.

Pakistan has seen a rise in the values of dowries in recent decades, as in other South Asian countries. However, in Pakistan it is still expected that a bride will bring some kind of dowry with her to a marriage, whether she is Muslim, Hindu, or Christian. The Dower (bride price), called mahr, and dowry, called jahaiz, are both customs with long histories in Pakistan. Today, the dowry will often consist of jewelry, clothing, and money. Dowry is expected while the majority of marriages are consanguineously arranged between first cousins.

Control of the dowry belongs to the bride in theory, although in practice control often transfers to the husband and in-laws, and grooms sometimes extort large dowries. In rural Pakistan, dowry values are still relatively low, around 12 percent of a household's annual (non-durable goods) expenses. Also, in rural Pakistan it is standard for the bride to maintain control over her dowry after marriage, rather than control of the dowry being given to the in-laws. A survey in January 2017 by Gallup Pakistan showed that 56 percent of the population expects the girl to bring dowry to marriage. The pressure among some Pakistanis to provide a large dowry results in some brides' families going into debt, including debt servitude; some brides build up their dowry with their own earnings if they work outside the home. The debt trap created by providing large dowries puts pressure on parents aspiring to arrange a marriage for their daughter(s) into a better social class. It is also cited as a reason for the current trend toward delayed marriages. Arranged marriages among first cousins are common, since they provide a way of keeping dowries within an extended family.

Pakistan has passed several laws to address the problem of excessive dowry demands: West Pakistan Dowry (Prohibition of Display) Act, 1967; Dowry and Bridal Gifts (Restriction) Act, 1976. Women's rights to inheritance separate from the dowry are offered some protection in the Muslim Personal Law of Shariat of 1948 and the Muslim Family Laws Ordinance of 1961. In October 2020, Pakistan became the first Muslim country to make it illegal to receive dowry as per the tenets of Islamic sunnah. According to the bill, the maximum amount to be given to the bride as her dowry may be no more than four tola gold, which may include clothes that belong to the bride, and bedsheets only. Guests arriving at the marriage ceremony will be banned from giving gifts costing more than 1,000 Pakistani rupees.

=== Nepal ===
The practice of dowry is common in Nepal, and dowry-related violence is increasingly becoming a problem. As a result, the dowry system has been banned in Nepal. Despite the laws, the violent incidents continue, under a general perception of impunity. Nepali people of the Madhesi society still freely welcome dowry as a right to the groom's side. Even highly educated people living in the Terai of Nepal accept dowry without any second thoughts. Parents have thus started dreading the birth of daughters in the family, going as far as determining the sex of fetuses in order to abort daughters. Many deaths have also been caused by not giving dowry to the groom's side. Dowry system, however, is not practiced by indigenous people and is less prevalent in Hill Region.

In Nepal, the practice of dowry is closely related to social prestige; and dowry violence is especially prevalent in the Terai belt. In 2009, Nepal enacted the Social Customs and Practices Act outlawing dowry; however, there have been no known cases of enforcement.

=== Sri Lanka ===
Here, the dowry is known as dewedda. The payment of dowry in Sri Lanka has a strong tradition, and has been connected to family violence. However its importance is declining, and violence related to it is not as common as in other South Asian countries, though it still exists.

=== Afghanistan ===
Dowry is called Jehez in Afghanistan, and is separate from Mahr, sherbaha, and brideprice (locally called walwar, toyana, or qalyn).

A large dowry is sometimes expected, and given, in Afghanistan; some houses are almost emptied so that the daughter may make a grand show at the wedding. Items included in a dowry depend on the resources of the bride's family and the demands made by the groom's family. Embroidery is traditionally included in a dowry, as is land, money, jewelry such as necklaces and pazab, shoes, shawls, carpets, bedding, furniture, crockery, mirrors, clocks and such items. The dowry is transferred from bride's family house to the groom's family house one day before the wedding day in a ritual ceremony with band and a procession, which typically adopts the longest route in the residential area for the Afghan community to see the dowry being given by the bride's family.

Afghanistan has both dowry and bride price, although the practice differs between different tribal and ethnic groups. In Afghanistan, a marriage typically requires two kinds of payments: a mahr, which typically consists of livestock, property and money, and in practice often takes the form of a bride price paid to the woman's family; and a dowry brought by the bride to her husband's home which may include various goods such as clothing, bedding and household utensils. The nature of dowry the bride brings often influences how she is treated when she arrives at her husband's home. Parents frequently arrange marriages for daughters at a young age, in order to end their economic responsibility for their daughter.

=== Iran ===
Dowry has existed in Persia for over 1000 years, and called jahīzīeh (sometimes spelled jahaz or jaheez, جهیزیه). Jahiz is vestments, furniture, jewelry, cash and other paraphernalia a bride's family gives to the bride to take with her to the groom's family. Jahiz is separate from Mahr required by Sharia religious laws, as well as the traditional payment of Shir Baha (literally: price of milk), in rural Iran. Dowry-related violence and deaths in Iran are reported in Iranian newspapers, some of which appear in English media.

=== Turkey ===
Dowry is known as çeyiz in Turkey. Çeyiz is the property and/or money the bride's family gives the couple at marriage. Çeyiz is different and separate from the Mahr, which is paid by the groom to the bride, or traditional baslik in some parts of Turkey. The giving of dowry has been replaced with the exchanging of gifts at the marriage ceremony by family members in modern times.

Çeyiz often includes furnishings, appliances, clothing, gold jewelry, cash and other items depending on the resources of the Turkish family. Some of the Turkish dowry remains with the couple after marriage, other is specifically meant for the groom's family and relatives. The çeyiz is typically agreed upon between the groom's and bride's families before the wedding date is finalized. According to tradition, even in current times, the dowry is displayed for showing-off, before the marriage in rural Turkey, at the bride's family, or groom's family—the display is typically attended and examined by women, particularly from the groom's family. In some cases, if the groom's family is not satisfied with the displayed dowry, the wedding is cancelled. The dowry is transferred, from the bride's family to the groom's family just before the wedding in a ceremonial ritual. Thereafter, the wedding is completed.

Scholars and government agencies claim significant domestic violence in Turkish population due to dowry disputes. Violence and property claims related disputes are more frequent if there is a divorce.

=== Thailand ===
In Thailand, it is a common practice for men to give dowry which is called สินสอด (sin-sot) in Thailand. Dowry is usually given by the groom to the parents of the bride before or during the wedding. This is often in the form of money or gold.

=== Azerbaijan ===
Dowry is known as cehiz in Azerbaijan. Cehiz is the property and money the bride's family must give to the groom's family prior to marriage. Cehiz is separate from the money under Mahr required under Sharia religious requirements in Islamic Azerbaijan. Cehiz often includes furnishings, appliances, crystal, mirrors, bed, jewelry and cash depending on the negotiations between the groom's and bride's families before the wedding day. While the groom's family receives Cehiz, the bride receives Mahr. Relatives of the bride often contribute to the Cehiz demands, through the ritual of koncas. Dowry is transferred a few days before the wedding, and examined by groom's family, and a Siyahı (receipt) for the dowry is issued by the groom's family; this helps avoid disputes. If some items of the dowry are not satisfactory, the wedding may be delayed or cancelled. Similar traditions continue in many regions of Caucasus, including non-Muslim ethnic groups.

=== Tajikistan ===
Dowries are sometimes expected in Tajikistan, and they often consist of a collection of traditional dresses which are on display on the wedding day. However, the practice is much less common than in other parts of the Persophone world, as Tajikistan has a strong history of secularism due to it being a former Soviet republic.

=== Egypt ===
In Egypt, dowry is known as Gehaz. This is the property a bride is expected to bring with her at marriage, and it is different from the dower (Mahr) paid by the groom to the bride per requirements of sharia. Gehaz is observed in rural and urban Egypt, and is typically negotiated between the groom's family and bride's. Gehaz includes furniture, appliances, jewelry, china, bedding and various household items. Families begin collecting dowry years before a girl is betrothed. Many Egyptian girls take up jobs so as to save money necessary to meet the expected dowry demands.

While the dowry is given during the marriage, in rural Egypt, it is ritually displayed to the village prior to the marriage. Every piece of the gehaz is placed on open cars that go around the village several times, with music, in order to show off the dowry being given by the bride's family to the groom. The gehaz show off ritual is also a means to enhance the bride's status within her new marital family.

=== Morocco ===
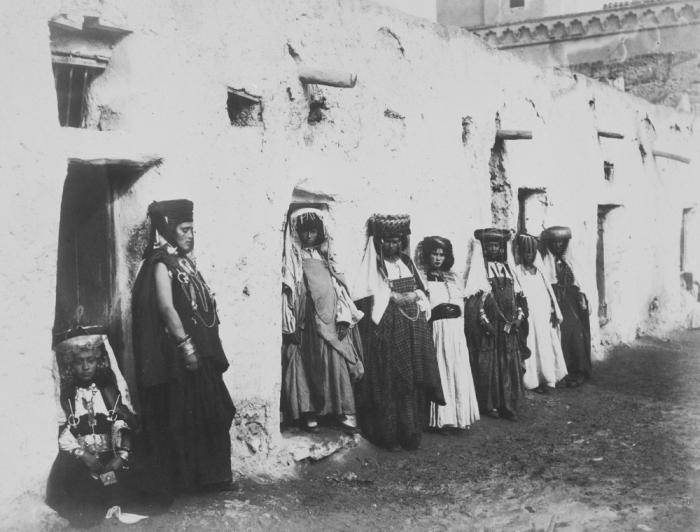
Muslim Ouled Nail girls waiting in the streets of an Algerian village to earn dowry as dancers. Algerian patrons invited them at cafés and festivals or to shrines of Muslim awliya. When their dowries were adequate they returned to their mountain villages and married within the tribe. This centuries-old tradition has continued into modern Algeria. (Photo from the late 19th century, courtesy of Tropenmuseum, The Netherlands)

Dowry is a traditional and current practice in Morocco, and is called shura, shawar, ssdaq, or amerwas depending on the speaker's region and ethnicity (e.g. Arabic, Berber, etc.). Dowry in Morocco is separate from the Mahr or Sadaq that is religiously required by Sharia.

Centuries ago, Mahr and Sadaq meant something different in Morocco. Mahr was the purchase price paid for the bride by the groom's family to the bride's father or guardian, while Sadaq was the betrothal gift offered by groom to the bride. Over time, the difference vanished and they are now one and the same, but different from the practice of dowry.

In modern times, the Moroccan practice is to split the so-called Sadaq, which meets the Islamic requirement of Mahr, into two parts: naqd (cash) and kali (remainder Mahr). The Naqd Sadaq is paid by the groom's family to bride's family before the wedding. The bride's family supplements the Naqd amount with an equal or greater amount of cash, and gives dowry (called shura, shawar or amerwas). This dowry typically includes furniture, clothing, appliances, beds, household items, divans, jewelry, and other property. The dowry amounts are negotiated before the wedding. Higher dowry and lower Mahr are expected for widows and divorcées than for virgins. If elders of the two families do not agree on the dowry amount, the marriage is typically delayed or cancelled. The value and composition of the dowry varies according to social class, family wealth and regional customs. The kali al-sadaq (sometimes called mwahhar in Northern Morocco) is paid later, to technically meet the requirements of Mahr under Islamic Sharia. The shura (dowry) far exceeds the kali al-sadaq, and there is a large transfer of wealth from bride's family to the couple and the groom's family.

=== Bosnia ===
Dowry is an old custom known as oprema in Bosnia. In neighboring regions, it is sometimes called prikija or ženinstvo. Another term miraz is used sometimes, but miraz is also used to mean inheritance, something different from dowry.

Oprema refers to the property the bride's parents give her as part of the marriage. It often includes furniture, kitchenware, decorative items, gold jewelry and other items. Oprema is also different from pohod (gift giving, dar) ritual of Bosnia, as well as the ruho (embroidered clothing) ritual. Oprema is discussed between the groom's and bride's family before the marriage; the groom's family sets the quality and quantity expectations. The oprema is typically not displayed to those who attend the wedding. Oprema and dar are a major economic burden to bride's family in Bosnia. Poorer families spend years saving money and buying oprema in order to get their daughter(s) married.

=== Serbia ===
Dowry is not a Slavic custom; medieval Serbia was first exposed to it by the Byzantines. During the Ottoman era, dowry was non existent. Although the custom might have had limited adoption in the 19th century, the communist regime outlawed dowry. It's possible that the custom may have survived in some rural areas to this day among the Romani population.

== Violence against women and international perspectives ==
Disputes related to dowry sometimes result in violence against women, including killings and acid attacks. Amnesty International has stated:

[T]he ongoing reality of dowry-related violence is an example of what can happen when women are treated as property. Brides unable to pay the high "price" to marry are punished by violence and often death at the hands of their in-laws or their own husbands.

The Declaration on the Elimination of Violence against Women classifies violence against women into three categories: that occurring in the family (DV), that occurring within the general community, and that perpetrated or condoned by the State. Family violence is defined as follows:

Physical, sexual and psychological violence occurring in the family, including battering, sexual abuse of female children in the household, dowry-related violence, marital rape, female genital mutilation and other traditional practices harmful to women, non-spousal violence and violence related to exploitation.

Kirti Singh states, "Dowry is widely considered to be both a cause and a consequence of son preference. The practice of dowry inevitably leads to discrimination in different areas against daughters and makes them vulnerable to various forms of violence." Singh suggests this may lead to girls being unwanted, sex-selective abortion, or her parents may abandon or mistreat her after she is born. UNICEF notes dowry helps perpetuate child marriage. The World Health Organization (WHO) has expressed concern for dowry-related femicide, citing the study by Virendra Kumar which argued that dowry deaths occur primarily in areas of the Indian subcontinent. They note the estimates for actual number of dowry deaths per year vary widely ranging from 600 to 750 homicides a year to 25,000 homicides a year, with official government records suggesting 7,618 deaths in 2006. Rakhshinda Perveen states thousands of dowry-related bride burning cases in Pakistan, yet few prosecutions and rare convictions for dowry-related violence against women.

UNODC includes dowry deaths as a form of gender-based violence. About 4.6% of total crimes against women in India were dowry death-related, and another 1.9% were related to violation of Dowry Prohibition Act. The dowry death rate in India has been about 0.7 women per 100,000 every year from 1998 to 2009.

== See also ==
- Bride price, the payment made by a groom to the bride or her family
- Excrex, old Spanish law of Aragon
- Hypergamy
- Mahr (mahar, mehr, meher, mehrieh, or mahriyeh), required in Quran for Muslims

== Sources ==
- Goody, Jack (1976). Production and Reproduction: A Comparative Study of the Domestic Domain. Cambridge University Press. ISBN 978-0-521-29088-3.
- Nazzari, Muriel (1991). Disappearance of the Dowry: Women, Families, and Social Change in São Paulo, Brazil, 1600-1900. Stanford University Press. ISBN 978-0-8047-1928-5.
- Goody, Jack; Tambiah, S. J. (1973). Bridewealth and Dowry. CUP Archive. ISBN 978-0-521-20169-8.
