= Arafundi River =

River in Papua New Guinea

Arafundi River Waiangra River
- Location within Papua New Guinea

Location
- Country: Papua New Guinea
- Region: East Sepik Province

Physical characteristics
- Source
  - location: Papua New Guinea
- Mouth
  - coordinates: 4°37′00″S 143°30′00″E

The Arafundi River is a river in northern Papua New Guinea.

== See also ==
- List of rivers of Papua New Guinea
- Arafundi languages
