= Bride service =

Services rendered by a bridegroom

Bride service has traditionally been portrayed in the anthropological literature as the service rendered by the bridegroom to a bride's family as a bride price or part of one (see dowry). Bride service and bride wealth models frame anthropological discussions of kinship in many regions of the world.

== Patterns ==
Patterns of matrilocal post-marital residence, as well as the practice of temporary or prolonged bride service, have been widely reported for indigenous peoples of the Amazon basin. Among these people, bride service is frequently performed in conjunction with an interval of uxorilocal residence. The length of uxorilocal residence and the duration of bride service are contingent upon negotiations between the concerned parties, the outcome of which has been characterized as an enduring commitment or permanent debt. The power wielded by those who "give" wives over those who "take" them is also said to be a significant part of the political relationships in societies where bride service obligations are prevalent.

Rather than seeing affinity in terms of a "compensation" model whereby individuals are exchanged as objects, Dean's (1995) research on Amazon bride service among the Urarina demonstrates how differentially situated subjects negotiate the politics of marriage.

"Bride service" involves a comparatively minimal amount of wealth transfer between families, especially if it is performed by a solitary prospective groom rather than by his entire family or clan. Thus, bride-service "may in many cases function more as a trial marriage than as a [form of] payment." Bride service has traditionally been practiced by Jivaro people in Peru–Ecuador and Timbira people in Brazil.

== Example ==
An example of bride service occurs in the Book of Genesis, when Jacob labored for Laban for fourteen years to marry Rachel. The original deal was seven years, but when the wedding day arrived, Laban tricked Jacob by giving him Leah, his older daughter, instead of Rachel. Jacob then had to work for Laban another seven years before he was permitted to marry Rachel.
