= Excrex =

In the old Spanish law of Aragon, an excrex was a gift from the groom to the bride at marriage.
