= Meakambut =

Nomadic people

Total population
- 62 (2016)

Regions with significant populations
- Papua New Guinea (East Sepik Province)

Languages
- Andai language

Religion
- Animism, Christianity

Related ethnic groups
- Awim, Imboin

The Meakambut is a nomadic people living in the East Sepik Province of Papua New Guinea.

== History ==
The Meakambut were first discovered by an Australian patrol in 1966. They were then found again by the Slovenian anthropologist Borut Telban in 1991, that visited the area again ten years later, without finding them. They were found again by the anthropologist Nancy Sullivan in 2008. Since then, with the help of Nancy Sullivan's team, they have partly settled in homes, without abandoning their hunter-gathering lifestyle.

== Lifestyle ==
The Meakambut live in small bands. Their substistence is based on hunting (mostly wild pigs, fish and cassowaries) and gathering; they also plant taro, pumpkins, cucumbers, bananas, cassava and tobacco.
They use caves as shelters, and there are 105 of them that have a name; the caves have a proprietary and are inherited. The most important cave is the Kopai Cave, which has a sacred value and preserves the ossuary of the ancestors and hand-shaped cave paintings.
