= Mundugumor language =

Yuat language of Papua New Guinea

Mundugumor
- Biwat
- Region: East Sepik Province, Papua New Guinea
- Ethnicity: Mundugumor people
- Native speakers: 3,000 (2003)
- Language family: Yuat: Mundugumor

Language codes
- ISO 639-3: bwm
- Glottolog: biwa1243
- ELP: Biwat
- Coordinates: 4.415234°S 143.859962°E

Mundugumor (Munduguma, Mundukomo) a.k.a. Biwat is a Yuat language of Papua New Guinea. It is spoken in Biwat village (4.415234°S 143.859962°E) of Yuat Rural LLG, East Sepik Province.

== Phonology ==
Mundukumo consonants are:

p	t		k
ᵐb	ⁿd	ᶮʤ	ᵑg
m	n	ɲ	ŋ
f	s		
ᵐv			
	r		
w		j	

Mundukumo vowels are:

i		u
e	ə	o
	a	

== Nouns ==
Some examples showing Mundukomo nouns and their irregular plural forms:

gloss	singular	plural
‘snake’	mas	mase
‘tooth’	adusuva	adusuvavi
‘bone’	avu	avuvavi
‘nose’	ŋlək	ŋlu
‘thigh’	guak	go
‘hand’	klik	klia
‘dog’	ken	kidu
‘betelnut’	siman	simadu
‘ear’	tuan	tuadu
‘fire’	mən	məda
‘basket’	ban	bada
‘mouth’	balaŋ	balaji
‘house’	klaŋ	klagi
‘star’	susuaŋ	susuagi
‘water’	mam	mabi
‘neck’	volam	volabi
‘ball’	muŋmam	muŋmabi
‘cassowary’	kalim	kalimu
‘girl’	analom	analomu
‘paddle’	dum	dumu

Similar patterns of complex nominal plural allomorphy are also found in the Lower Sepik-Ramu languages.
