= Arafundi languages =

Upper Yuat language family of Papua New Guinea

Arafundi
- Alfendio; Arafundi River
- Geographic distribution: Arafundi River, East Sepik Province, Papua New Guinea
- Linguistic classification: Madang – Upper Yuat: Upper Yuat; Arafundi

Language codes
- Glottolog: araf1243
- ELP: Alfendio

The Arafundi languages are a small family of clearly related languages in East Sepik Province, Papua New Guinea. They are conjectured to be related to the Piawi and Madang languages. They are named after the Arafundi River.

Alfendio is an old synonym for Arafundi, from when it was still considered a single language.

== Languages ==
The Arafundi languages form a dialect continuum where language boundaries are blurred.

The Arafundi languages are,

- Nanubae
- Tapei
- Andai (Meakambut)
- Awiakay (Karamba)

Kassell, et al. (2018) recognize Andai, Nanubae, and Tapei.

Foley (2018) cites Hoenigman (2015) for 'Upper Arafundi' and 'Lower Arafundi', as well as listing Awiakay and 'Imboin'. However, the scope of these names is somewhat confused. Usher notes,

Hoenigman (2015: 46 after Hoenigman and Evans 2013) designates Nanubae as Lower Arafundi and Andai–Meakambut as Upper Arafundi, with what we guess to be Tapei labelled simply Imboin after the name of a village where Tapei (Awim) as well as Andai (Namata) and Awiakay (Karamba) are spoken (Kassell, MacKenzie and Potter 2017: 13.) However, she assigns the Tapei-speaking Awim village to the Lower Arafundi language, which contradicts our data from Haberland (1966: 62-64) and Kassell, MacKenzie and Potter (2017: 48-54).

An Enga-based pidgin is also used by speakers of Arafundi languages.

== Classification ==
Laycock (1973) grouped the Arafundi languages with the Ramu languages, although (according to his comments in the introduction) this grouping was apparently impressionistic and not based on either reconstructive work or lexicostatistics. Ross (2005) retains Laycock's grouping without comment. However, Foley (2005) does not include Arafundi within Ramu, and Ethnologue (2009) shows them as an independent family. Foley has suggested instead that the Arafundi and Piawi languages may be related (Comrie 1992), a position confirmed by Timothy Usher.

== Proto-language ==
Some lexical reconstructions of Proto-Arafundi River by Usher (2020) are:

| gloss | Proto-Arafundi River |
|---|---|
| head | *kopa |
| hair/feather(s) | *tum[a] |
| ear | *kund[a] |
| nose | *pok |
| tooth | *kandz[a] |
| tongue | *taTumat[a] |
| foot/leg | *panamb[a] |
| blood | *kombet- |
| bone | *jekimb[a] |
| skin | *kumb[a]-; *tut[a] |
| breast | *ji[t/s] |
| louse | *emuŋg |
| dog | *tawa[m/mb] |
| pig | *jat |
| bird | *kenet |
| egg | *mund[a] |
| tree | *jes |
| man | *nuŋgum |
| woman | *nam |
| sun | *kVjom |
| moon | *kepa |
| water | *jomb |
| fire | *jamb |
| stone | *naŋgum |
| name | *membi[a] |
| eat/drink | *nembV- |
| two | *kamin, *kondamin |

== See also ==
- Yimas-Arafundi Pidgin
