= Yuat River =

River in Papua New Guinea

Coordinates: 4°10′13″S 143°51′14″E

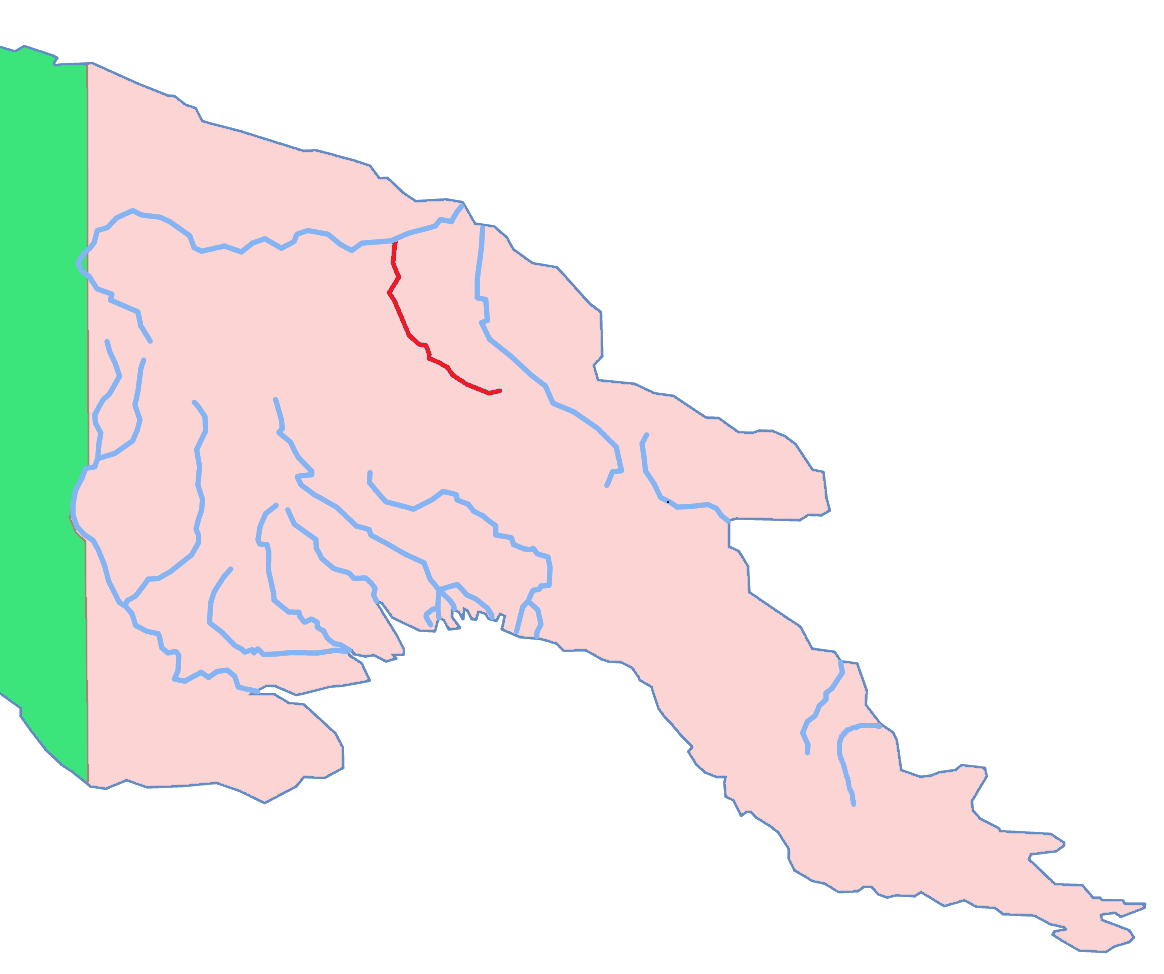

Location
- Country: Papua New Guinea
- Region: East Sepik Province

Physical characteristics
- Source
  - location: northern Papua New Guinea
- Mouth
  - location: Sepik River
- Length: 373.4 km (232.0 mi)
- Basin size: 12,500 km^{2} (4,800 sq mi)

Basin features
- River system: Sepik

The Yuat is the major tributary of the Sepik River in northern Papua New Guinea. The Yuat is on the right (southern) side and joins the Sepik about 20 linear km upstream from the Keram River, and just downstream from the Chambri Lakes. The eponymous (Middle) Yuat and Upper Yuat languages are spoken along the banks of the Yuat River.

Yuat Rural LLG in East Sepik Province derives its name from the river.

== Tributaries ==
Yuat River has many tributaries, the two major source is Lai River 179 km and Jimi River 148 km long.

List of Yuat River Tributaries by length

- Lai River 179 km
- Jimi River 148 km
