= Upper Yuat languages =

Language family of Papua New Guinea

Upper Yuat
- Upper Yuat River
- Geographic distribution: Upper Yuat River watershed, Papua New Guinea
- Linguistic classification: Northeast New Guinea and/or Trans–New Guinea: Madang – Upper Yuat; Upper Yuat
- Subdivisions: Arafundi; Piawi

Language codes
- Glottolog: None

The Upper Yuat languages consist of two small language families, namely Arafundi and Piawi, spoken in the region of the upper Yuat River of New Guinea. The connection was first suggested by William A. Foley and confirmed by Timothy Usher, who further links them to the Madang languages.

Upper Yuat languages display more typological similarities with Trans-New Guinea than the other neighboring language families of the Sepik-Ramu basin (namely the Lower Sepik-Ramu and Yuat families). The Madang languages are frequently included in Trans–New Guinea classifications, but the connection is not yet demonstrated.

The Piawi languages are morphologically much simpler than the Arafundi languages.

== Linguistic varieties ==
Foley (2018) lists the following linguistic varieties.

Upper Yuat

- Piawi languages: Harway (Wiyaw / Waibuk), Pinai-Hagahai (Pinaye, Aramo / Aramaue)
- Arafundi languages: Awiakay, Lower Arafundi, Upper Arafundi, Imboin

== Pronouns ==
Reconstructions of Proto-Upper Yuat personal pronoun are:

Proto-Upper Yuat pronouns
	singular	plural
1st person	*ni	*an ~ *aŋ
2nd person	*na	*ne
3rd person	*nu	

Personal pronouns in individual languages are as follows:

	Harway	Hagahai	Pinai	Lower Arafundi	Upper Arafundi	Awiakay
1SG	nɨ-ɡə	ŋɨ-ɡə	nɨ-ɡa	ɲɨŋ	niŋ	niŋ
2SG	na-ɡo	na-ɣə	na-ɡa	nan	nan	nan
3SG	nu-ɡʷə	nə-ɣʷə		an		an
1DU				as	as	as
2/3DU				nɨɲ	nen	neɲ
1PL	an-ɡə	an-ɡə	nanə-ɡa	aŋ		aŋ
2/3PL	ɲɨ-ɡə	ɲe-ɡə	ɲi-ɡa	noŋ	noŋ	noŋ

3rd-person *nu (number uncertain) corresponds to Piawi 3 singular and Arafundi 2/3 plural, *ne to Piawi 2/3 plural and Arafundi 2/3 dual.

== Phonology ==
Upper Yuat languages typically have 7 vowels:

i	ɨ	u
e	ə	o
	a	
