= Amto language =

Amto–Musan language of Papua New Guinea

Amto
- Native to: Papua New Guinea
- Region: Amto ward, Green River Rural LLG, Sandaun Province
- Native speakers: 500 (2013)
- Language family: Arai–Samaia: Amto–Musan (Samaia); Amto

Language codes
- ISO 639-3: amt
- Glottolog: amto1250
- ELP: Amto
- Coordinates: 4.052936°S 141.328446°E

Amto (also known as Ki) is an Amto–Musan language spoken in Sandaun Province of Papua New Guinea.

Amto is spoken in Amanab and Rocky Peak Districts, south of the Upper Sepik River, toward the headwaters of the Left May River on the Samaia River. It is spoken in three villages, Amto (4.052936°S 141.328446°E), Amu, and Habiyon of Green River Rural LLG, Sandaun Province.
