= Chambri =

Chambri may refer to:

- Chambri people
- Chambri language
- Chambri Lakes
