= Tama languages =

Small family of languages of northern Papua New Guinea

Tama
- Geographic distribution: Sepik River basin, Papua New Guinea: just to the south of Nuku town in eastern Sandaun Province
- Linguistic classification: Sepik: Middle Sepik; Tama

Language codes
- Glottolog: sepi1256
- The Sepik languages as classified by Foley (2018)

The Tama languages are a small family of three clusters of closely related languages of northern Papua New Guinea, spoken just to the south of Nuku town in eastern Sandaun Province. They are classified as subgroup of the Sepik languages. Tama is the word for 'man' in the languages that make up this group.

Yessan-Mayo and Mehek are the best documented Tama languages.

== Languages ==
Usher (2020) classifies the Tama languages as follows,

Tama

- Pasi–Yamano: Ayi, Pasi, Yamano (Yessan-Mayo)
- Mehek–Pahi: Pahi, Mehek
- Wogamus: Wogamusin, Chenapian

Foley (2018), following Donald Laycock, provides the following classification.

Tama

- Kalou
- Ayi
- Pahi, Mehek (Makru)
- Pasi, Yessan-Mayo (Yamano)

Kalou is actually related to Amal.

== Phonology ==
The Tama languages distinguish /r/ and /l/, unlike many other Papuan languages that have only one liquid consonant.

== Vocabulary comparison ==
The following basic vocabulary words are from Laycock (1968), as cited in the Trans-New Guinea database.

The words cited constitute translation equivalents, whether they are cognate (e.g. suwa, huwa for “leg”) or not (e.g. namra, wapray for “eye”).

gloss	Mehek	Pahi	Yessan-Mayo	Yessan-Mayo (Warasai dialect)
head	terfa	taraʔwey	tara	
ear	namra	wapray	wan	wan
eye	lakwo	niaʔwey	la; lə	la
nose	wiliŋki	fikihinwi	raŋkɨ; raŋki	haŋki
tooth	mpi	piaʔwey	lər; lir	rir
tongue	tawul	tafəki	tawlə	kawul
leg	suwa	huwa	towa; warə	sowa
louse	nunum	nunum	nɨ; ni	niʔ
dog	wala	waʔay	wala	wale
pig			for	
bird	fenre	feydey	ap	apu
egg	lakwo	yaʔwey	yen; yɨn	yan
blood	kefu	nefum	nap	nap
bone	yefa	yefa	yaha	
skin	liki	fuhum	was	
breast	muku	muwi	mu; mukw	mukw
tree	moː	muy	me	meʔ
man	tama	tama	tama; tamə	kama
woman	tawa	tawa	taː	ka
sun	nampul	napuy	yabəl; yampəl	yampəl
moon	nekwa	nefʔa	lup; lɨyf	lüp
water	okwu	oʔwi	ok; okw	okw
fire	kiri	irʔi	k-er; kər	kər
stone	arkwo	hijopey	pa	papə
eat			a(m)	
one			wurɨ	
two	lisifu		fes	kes
