= Sepik Hill languages =

Sepik language branch of Papua New Guinea

Sepik Hill
- Geographic distribution: Sepik Hills, south-central East Sepik Province, in the Sepik River basin of Papua New Guinea
- Linguistic classification: Sepik: Sepik Hill

Language codes
- Glottolog: sepi1258
- The Sepik languages as classified by Foley (2018). The Sepik Hill languages are in green.

The Sepik Hill languages form the largest and most ramified branch of the Sepik languages of northern Papua New Guinea. They are spoken along the southern margin of the Sepik floodplain in the foothills of Central Range of south-central East Sepik Province.

== Languages ==
The languages according to Usher (2020) are,

Sepik Hills

- Saniyo-Hiyewe
- Southwest Sepik Hills: Niksek (Paka, Gabiano), Piame, Hewa
- Bahinemo–Berinomo
- East Sepik Hills (Alamblak etc.)

The languages according to Foley (2018) are:

Sepik Hill

- Eastern (Alamblak etc.)
- Central (Bahinemo etc.)
- Western: Saniyo-Hiyewe, Paka (Setiali), Gabiano (Niksek), Piame, Bikaru, Umairof, Hewa

Other than disagreement at to what is a language or a dialect (Glottolog, for example, concludes that the 'Bikaru' language is probably spurious, and doesn't list Umairof at all), the only difference from Usher is in combining Sanio with the Southwest Sepik Hills languages as a Western branch.

== Pronouns ==
Pronouns in Sepik Hill languages:

pronoun	Sare	Alamblak	Saniyo-Hiyewe
1sg	an	na	ane
2sg	nɨ	ni	ne
3sg.m	rɨ	rər	rei
3sg.f	sɨ	rət	
1du	nond	nə	noto-(si)
2du	fin	nifɨn	fene-si
3du	fɨ	rəf	rowe-si
1pl	nom	nəm	nomo
2pl	mɨ	nikə(m)	fene
3pl	rom	rəm	rowe

== Vocabulary comparison ==
The following basic vocabulary words are from Davies & Comrie (1985), Dye et al. (1968), Foley (2005), Macdonald (1973), and various SIL field notes, as cited in the Trans-New Guinea database.

The words cited constitute translation equivalents, whether they are cognate (e.g. ɲinga, ningaw, nikha for “eye”) or not (e.g. wabo, nuŋgař, yerɛpm for “bird”).

Language	Alamblak	Bahinemo	Berinomo	Bisis	Kapriman	Bikaru	Saniyo-Hiyewe
head	mʌbogath; mɛ̈ƀɨǥatʰ	thu	tu tɛpi	tuʔus	toɣo	ʔambu; yowidi 'hɔřise	tu; worɛ siyaʔi
hair	tʰɨ'maʀ̌č; tʌmarts; tʰɨ'maʀ̌š	thunʌba	to towa; tu sowa	tuam	tuwam	nɨmbɨ; yowididise	mato towe; tutowe
ear	yimbɣindang; yɩmbɨǥin'daŋgɨtʰ; yɩmbʌlindangʌm	bʌsiya	pɛnɛhax	wanbatal	womblaja	haři; waʔaʌ	apahɛ; apaniyɛ
eye	ɲinga; 'ɲiŋgaʀ̥̥̌; ningaw	niya	niya	nika	nikha	mɨn 'taʔamɨ; tařa	nihe; nihɛ
nose	'hʰušɨ ɨtʰ; khusɩmʌth; 'kʰučɨmɨtʰ; kusm	sɛkʌnɩ	ɛrɛm	sikʌľap̶ar	singova	taʔama; towi	ɛrɛme; ɛrɛmɛ
tooth	bɩ'čɛ̈tʰ; biʃə; bɩ'šɛ̈tʰ; bɩsʌm	pi	pi	binikam	bim	ne; nɨmbi	pi
tongue	tor; torkh; 'tʰoʀ̥̌tʰ	thɔlu	tor	toguʌl	thʌdɩs	ketasi; tɨgalɨ	sořowɛ; soruwɛ
leg	wʌlat; 'wɷ'řatʰ; wura	lowa	rowa hɛna	wɛlis	wola		lowe; rowɛ
louse	nəm; 'nɛ̈mɨtʰ; nʌmo	nʌmu	tu nɛm	ninis	nʌmɩs	aƀʌkʰ; lema	nɛmɛ
dog	yauʀ̥̌ʸ; yawi; yawu	yo	yao	yau	yom	waʔšɨ; waʔšʌ; wina	yo; you
pig	'ᵽɛ̈gɨʀ̥̌; fagʌr; fəɣ	fa	hɛ	p̶oʔol	fʌɣr		fe
bird	nongwar; 'nugwaʀ̥̌	wabo	uro	nuŋgař	yerɛpm	heka; namʷio; waʔaƀi	iřowɛ; iruwɛ
egg	fɣa; fokam; ᵽo'ǥat	wabo mu	uro wɛka	nuŋgwawobom	yuɣwar	heře akia; mbandung	hotɛ
blood	khukhupam; kɨ'kʰupʰam	mahələ	marɛ hax	kukwem	kokwem	gugubase	fisa'i; fisaʔi
bone	thʌphim; tɨ'pɩʀ̥̌; tɨpi	hʌbi	sɛtsɛpi	sɩbɩkʰam	sibevam	hɔři	paʔaře; pa'arɛ
skin	tʰɨ'ǥatʰ; thʌkhath	thʌbi	tepi	tibi	thʌgas	ha'baisi; nbangɨ	tahɛ
breast	mingam; miŋatʰ; niŋgam	mosu	mok	minika	mʌnikha	ařu'se:; muña	mo'u; moʔu
tree	mᵼč; mim; mᵼš; mɨy	mi	mɛ	mom	mə	mi; sia	me; mɛ
man	yima; 'yi'maʀ̥̌	'ɩma	muwɛ pɛhɛnɛ	nimař	wiyak	ntu; wɔbi	mɛni; mitaru
woman	'metɨtʰ7; metum	swani	mesan	toʔanʌs	toɣwan	taʔagwa; wita	taunɛ; tawnɛ
sun	mar; 'mařɨʀ̥̌	tɩniya	teniya	maľɛľɛl	yɛneza	ñʌ; yaki	poɔyuɛ; poweyɛ
moon	yam; 'yamɨtʰ; yamʌth	yamal	nop	yaguso	yagos	babume; mpaʔopmu	yamɛ; yamɛ'
water	bukbam; 'bupʰam; bu-pam	hagi	saʔ	sagim	sagim	eipa; ngu	sa'i; saʔi
fire	kaɣ; kʰaǥɨtʰ; khaxth	ya	itai	yoʔoy	moyos	ʔiya; sea	yɛhɛ
stone	š; taxim	ba	pa	obak	obar	hana; tumbu	tapiyɛ
road, path	yɨ'ǥotʸoǥatʰ		yo	ʔatʰoř		yaʔambu; yəřo; yəto	
name	'yuƀatʰ; yufa; yufat	wufa	wiyapa		ovas		yapɛ
eat	fa; ka; 'kʰaɛ̈ʀ̥̌; weyanum; ye	diyaw		bʌľia̠s	asoliya	ʔagʌnʌ	aiyei; asiyʌ
one	rɛphar; rpa; řɨpʰatʰ	dʌbatha	tɛpa	tabak	dɩbar	kɨtʌkʰ; yoko habia	hɛta'i; taʔi
two	hutsif; xočiᵽ; 'xošɩᵽ	husi	howis	wɩtɩp	kothi	ƀɩtik; yoko labo	hɛsi
