= Sepik Iwam language =

Sepik language spoken in Papua New Guinea

Sepik Iwam
- Yawenian
- Region: East Sepik Province
- Native speakers: (2,500 cited 2000 census)
- Language family: Sepik: Upper Sepik; Iwam; Sepik Iwam

Language codes
- ISO 639-3: iws
- Glottolog: sepi1255
- ELP: Sepik Iwam
- Coordinates: 4.291°S 142.01°E

Hauna pidgin
- Region: East Sepik Province
- Native speakers: None
- Language family: Iwam-based pidgin

Language codes
- ISO 639-3: None (mis)
- Glottolog: haun1238

Sepik Iwam, or Yawenian, is a language of Papua New Guinea. It is the lexical basis of the Hauna trade pidgin.

It is spoken in villages such as Iniok (4.291°S 142.01°E) in Tunap/Hunstein Rural LLG of East Sepik Province.

== Phonology ==
Consonants
		Labial	Alveolar	Velar	Glottal
Nasal		m	n		
Plosive	voiceless	p	t	k	
Plosive	voiced	b	d	ɡ	
Fricative			s		h
Liquid			r		
Semivowel		w	j		

Vowels
	Front	Central	Back
Close	i		u
Mid	e	ə	o
Open		a	

== Pronouns ==
Sepik Iwam pronouns:

		singular	dual	plural
1st person		ka	kərar	kəram
2nd person		kə	kow	kom
3rd person	masculine	si	sow	səm
3rd person	feminine	sa	sow	səm

== Grammar ==
Sepik Iwam subject agreement suffixes are:

	singular	dual	plural
masculine	*-ən	*-o	*-əm
feminine	*-a	*-o	*-əm

The structure of this subject agreement paradigm can be traced back to Proto-Sepik, although the morphemes themselves do not seem to be directly related to the reconstructed Proto-Sepik forms. (See also Sepik languages#Gender.)

Like May River Iwam, Sepik Iwam has periodic tense, for instance the matutinal -iyakwok.
