= Awtuw language =

Sepik language spoken in Papua New Guinea

Awtuw
- Region: East Wapei Rural LLG, Sandaun Province, Papua New Guinea
- Native speakers: 700 (2014)
- Language family: Sepik: Ram; Awtuw

Language codes
- ISO 639-3: kmn
- Glottolog: awtu1239
- ELP: Awtuw

Awtuw (Autu), also known as Kamnum, is spoken in Sandaun Province, Papua New Guinea. It is a polysynthetic language closely related to Karawa and Pouye. It is spoken in Galkutua, Gutaiya (3.565508°S 142.001655°E), Kamnom (3.552454°S 141.994165°E), Tubum (3.567408°S 142.003722°E), and Wiup (3.553766°S 141.9845°E) villages in Kamnom East ward, East Wapei Rural LLG, Sandaun Province.

It is an endangered language, being widely replaced by Tok Pisin.

== Phonology ==
Awtuw consonants are:

	Bilabial	Alveolar	Palatal	Velar
Nasal	m	n		ŋ
Plosive	p	t		k
Rhotic		r	ɻ	
Lateral		l		
Semivowel	w		j	

Awtuw vowels are:

	Front	Central	Back
Close	i		u
Close-mid	e	ə	o
Near-open	æ		
Open	a		

== Pronouns ==
Pronouns are:

	sg	du	pl
1	wan	nan	nom
2	yen	an	om
3m	rey	ræw	rom
3f	tey	ræw	rom

== Verbal morphology ==
Awtuw has a very rich verbal morphology, with 8 prefixal slots encoding tense, aspect, modality, polarity, subject number and reciprocal.). Six of these slots contain prefixes that have cognates in Pouye.

The suffixal chain contains recently grammaticalized suffixes encoding associated motion, aspect, benefactive, and various unusual categories such as celerative -imya 'quickly' as in (1) (grammaticalized from the verb imya 'run'), simulative -panya 'pretend', and periodic tense (adauroral -alw 'until dawn').

Rey aeye rokr’-imy’-e.
3sg:MASC food cook-CELER-PST
'He cooked the food quickly.' (Feldman 1983: 122–123)
