= Iteri language =

Left May language spoken in Papua New Guinea

Iteri
- Rocky Peak
- Native to: Papua New Guinea
- Region: Sandaun Province, Rocky Peak Mountains
- Native speakers: 480 (2003)
- Language family: Arai–Samaia: Left May (Arai); Iteri

Language codes
- ISO 639-3: itr
- Glottolog: iter1241
- ELP: Iteri
- Coordinates: 4°7′S 141°35′E

Iteri is a Left May language of Papua New Guinea, in the Rocky Peak Mountains of Sandaun Province. There are about 475 speakers in all.

Alternate names include Alowiemino, Laro, Iyo, Yinibu, and Rocky Peak. (Some list Rocky Peak/Yinibu as a separate language; insufficient research has been conducted as to the exact relation among the languages in the Left May dialect continuum.)

Most speakers are monolingual, but some also speak Ama.

== See also ==
- Papuan languages
