= Upper Sepik languages =

Language group in northern Papua New Guinea

Upper Sepik
- Upper Sepik River
- Geographic distribution: Sandaun Province and western East Sepik Province, Papua New Guinea
- Linguistic classification: Sepik: Upper Sepik
- Subdivisions: Abau–Iwam; Yellow and Wanibe Rivers

Language codes
- Glottolog: None
- The Sepik languages as classified by Foley (2018)

The Upper Sepik languages are a group of ten to a dozen languages generally classified among the Sepik languages of northern Papua New Guinea.

== Languages ==
The Upper Sepik languages are:

- Abau–Iwam
  - Abau
  - Iwam languages
- Yellow and Wanibe Rivers
  - Amal–Kalou
    - Amal
    - Kalou
  - Ram languages (see)
  - Yellow River languages (see)

Although even the pronouns do not appear to be cognate, Foley classifies the Abau–Iwam languages with the Wogamus languages rather than with the Yellow and Wanibe River languages on the basis of a unique noun-class system in the numeral systems (see Wogamus languages#Noun classes). Additionally, Foley considers Sepik Iwam and Wogamusin noun class prefixes to be likely cognate with each other. Abau is more divergent, but its inclusion by Foley (2018) is based on the similarity of Abau verbal morphology to that of the Iwam languages. Foley observes that much of the lexicon and pronouns of these languages do not derive from proto-Sepik.

== Numerals ==
Upper Sepik morphological numerals are (Foley 2018):

gloss	Abau	Sepik Iwam	Wogamusin	Chenapian
‘one’	-eyn ~ -mon ~ -ron	-or	-Vd	-rə
‘two’	-(r)eys	-is	-us	-si
‘three’	-(r)ompri	-um	-um	-mu
