= Auwon language =

Sepik language spoken in Papua New Guinea

Awun
- Native to: Papua New Guinea
- Region: Sandaun Province
- Native speakers: 400 (2003)
- Language family: Sepik: Yellow River; Awun

Language codes
- ISO 639-3: aww
- Glottolog: awun1245
- ELP: Awun
- Coordinates: 3.814517°S 142.042193°E

Awun (Auwon) is a Sepik language spoken in Yakeltim (3.814517°S 142.042193°E) village of Namea Rural LLG, Sandaun Province, Papua-New Guinea.
