= WTK =

WTK may refer to:

- Noatak Airport, Alaska, IATA airport code WTK
- Watakataui language, ISO 639-3 language code wtk
- We the Kings, an American rock band
- The Well-Tempered Clavier (Das wohltemperierte Klavier, WTK), a book of musical works by Bach

== See also ==
- WTKS (disambiguation)
- List of widget toolkits
