= Kaningra language =

Sepik language spoken in Papua New Guinea

Kaningra
- Native to: Papua New Guinea
- Region: Karawari Rural LLG, East Sepik Province
- Native speakers: 330 (2006)
- Language family: Sepik: Sepik Hill; Alamblak; Kaningra

Language codes
- ISO 639-3: knr
- Glottolog: kani1285
- ELP: Kaningra
- Kaningra is classified as Vulnerable by the UNESCO Atlas of the World's Languages in Danger.
- Coordinates: 4.541275°S 143.33889°E

Kaningra (Kaningara) language is a Sepik language of Papua New Guinea.

It is spoken in two villages, including Kaningara village (4.541275°S 143.33889°E) of Karawari Rural LLG in East Sepik Province.
