= Amto–Musan languages =

Language family of Papua New Guinea

Amto–Musan
- Samaia River
- Geographic distribution: Samaia River, Sandaun Province, Papua New Guinea
- Linguistic classification: Arai–Samaia or independent language family: Amto–Musan
- Subdivisions: Amto; Siawi

Language codes
- Glottolog: amto1249

Amto–Musan is a language family of two closely related but mutually unintelligible Papuan languages, Amto and Siawi, spoken along the Samaia River of Sandaun Province of Papua New Guinea.

== Languages ==
Foley (2018) and Usher (2020) agree that the family consists of two languages.

Amto–Musan / Samaia River family

- Amto (Ki)
- Musan (Musian, Siawi)

== External relationships ==
Amto–Musan was left unclassified by Ross (2005) (see Papuan languages#Ross (2005)) due to lack of data; Wurm (1975) had posited it as an independent family. The family has typological similarities with the Busa language isolate, but these do not appear to demonstrate a genetic relationship.

Timothy Usher links the Amto–Musan languages to their neighbors, the Arai languages and the Pyu language in as Arai–Samaia stock.

Foley (2018) classifies them separately as an independent language family. Foley also notes that due to heavy contact and trade with Left May languages, Amto–Musan languages have borrowed much cultural vocabulary from Left May.

== Cognates ==
Amto-Musan family cognates listed by Foley (2018):

Amto-Musan family cognates
gloss	Amto	Musan
‘bad’	supuware	pioware
‘bird’	ai	ʔai
‘black’	towan	tewane
‘breast’	ne	ne
‘ear’	ye	ʔe
‘eye’	mo	mene
‘fire’	mari	mari
‘leaf’	he	sɛʔ
‘liver’	tei	teʔ
‘louse’	nanu	nanu
‘man’	kyu	yɛnokono
‘mother’	ena	inaʔ
‘nape’	tipiyari	tibiare
‘older brother’	apɔ	aboʔ
‘road’	mo	mono
‘sago’	tɔ	tawe
‘tongue’	həne	hanɛ
‘tooth’	i	ʔi
‘tree’	ami	ameʔ
‘water’	wi	wi

Possible cognates between the Amto-Musan and Left May families:

Possible Amto-Musan family and Left May family cognates
gloss	Amto	Musan	Ama	Nimo	Owiniga
‘breast’	ne	ne	nano	nɔ	nano
‘arm’		næ	naino	ina	
‘louse’	nani	nanu	ani		eni
‘tooth’	i	ʔi	i	i	
‘water’	wi	wi	iwa	wi	bi

Possible loanwords reflecting the close trade relationship between Amto-Musan and Left May speakers:

- ‘arrow’ Amto lamu, Musan namu, Ama lamu
- ‘stone’: Amto tabeki, Musan tipeki, Bo təpəki, Ama tomoki

== Vocabulary comparison ==
The following basic vocabulary words are from Conrad & Dye (1975), as cited in the Trans-New Guinea database:

The words cited constitute translation equivalents, whether they are cognate (e.g. tipeki, ʌbɛki for “stone”) or not (e.g. twæ, nani for “head”).

gloss	Amto	Siawi
head	twæ	nani
hair	(twæ) iwɔ	nanigi
ear	ye	eʔ
eye	mo	mene
nose	ni	Ǐimʌ
tooth	i	ʔi
tongue	hæne; hʌne	hanɛ
louse	nanu	nani
dog	hɔ	soː
pig	ma	kinʌdiʔ
bird	ai	ʔai
egg	aiː	iǏɔ
blood	nʌkei	hařʔ
bone	hae	hařʔ
skin	ka	ʔaoko
breast	ne	ne
tree	amɩ	ameʔ
man	kyu	yɛnokono
woman	hama	ʔeǏo
water	wiː	wi
fire	maři	maǏi
stone	tipeki	tʌbɛki
road, path	mo	mono
eat	meːne	pe
one	ohu	sʌmo
two	kiyaA	himolo
