= Nakwi language =

Left May language of Papua New Guinea

Nakwi
- Native to: Papua New Guinea
- Region: East Sepik Province
- Native speakers: 280 (2003)
- Language family: Arai–Samaia: Left May (Arai); Nakwi

Language codes
- ISO 639-3: nax
- Glottolog: nakw1240
- ELP: Nakwi

Nakwi is a Left May language of Papua New Guinea, in East Sepik Province. It is close to Nimo.

Nakwi is spoken to the south of the Ama-speaking area, in Augot, Nakwi-Amasu, Tiki (4.156505°S 141.677012°E), and Uwau (4.169381°S 141.599085°E) villages in Tunap/Hunstein Rural LLG, East Sepik Province.
