= Tunap/Hunstein Rural LLG =

Local-level government in Papua New Guinea

- Location within Papua New Guinea
- Coordinates: 4.318314°S 141.793296°E
- Country: Papua New Guinea
- Province: East Sepik Province
- Time zone: UTC+10 (AEST)

Tunap/Hunstein Rural LLG (often spelled locally as Tunap/Hustein) is a local-level government (LLG) of East Sepik Province, Papua New Guinea. The LLG is home to speakers of many different Left May languages and Sepik languages.

== Wards ==
- 01. Hotmin
- 02. Burmai
- 03. Arai
- 04. Nino (Nimo language speakers)
- 05. Itelinu
- 06. Samo (Owiniga language speakers)
- 07. Painum
- 08. Wanium
- 09. Aumi
- 10. Pekwei
- 11. Wanamoi
- 12. Waniap (Ama language (New Guinea) speakers)
- 13. Kavia (Ama language (New Guinea) speakers)
- 14. Ama (Ama language (New Guinea) speakers)
- 15. Yenuai (Nakwi language and Ama language (New Guinea) speakers)
- 16. Panawai
- 17. Imombi (Iwam language speakers)
- 18. Mowi (Iwam language speakers)
- 19. Iniok (Sepik Iwam language speakers)
- 20. Paupe (Papi language speakers)
- 21. Oum 3
- 22. Walio (Walio language speakers)
- 23. Nein
- 24. Nekiei/Wusol
- 25. Masuwari
- 26. Sio (Sanio language speakers)
- 27. Hanasi (Sanio language speakers)
- 28. Moropote
- 29. Maposi (Sanio language speakers)
- 30. Lariaso
- 31. Yabatawe
- 32. Sowano
- 33. Bitara (Berinomo language speakers)
- 34. Kagiru (Berinomo language speakers)
- 35. Begapuki
- 36. Wagu
- 37. Niksek/Paka (Niksek language speakers)
- 38. Gahom (Bahinemo language speakers)
