= Piame language =

Sepik language of Papua New Guinea

Piame
- Biami
- Native to: Papua New Guinea
- Region: East Sepik Province
- Ethnicity: Hewa
- Native speakers: (Less than 100 cited 1988)
- Language family: Sepik: Sepik Hill; Southwest; Piame

Language codes
- ISO 639-3: pin
- Glottolog: piam1243
- ELP: Piame

Piame, or Biami, is a Sepik language, which in 1988 was spoken in the village of Piame in northwestern Papua New Guinea.

== Relationship to other languages ==
Piame is closely related to Niksek, with cognate percentages ranging from 44% to 53% for the different Niksek dialects.

== Sociolinguistics ==
In 1988, it was spoken by less than a hundred people, in the single village of Piame. The village was primarily monolingual. Two or three men had begun to learn Tok Pisin, the lingua franca of Papua New Guinea.

The language is today described as moribund.

== Vocabulary ==
The table below is a sample of words in Piame:

Piame	English
pasikofi	afternoon
bawe	arrow
mokuawo	baby
mekia	back
wɔřou	cassowary
a yopakaři	chin
yabi	dog
peni	ear
yelia kaia	egg
wauwuo	fat
aise	father
mɔmiyaři məməni moku'awo	girl
yelia kowane	good
kouřinobo	hair
nɔti	hand
u'kwəti	knee
misaři	knife
mekwa	leaf
yelia meisa	long
məmini'nɔni	man
ake/kɔřisib̵ab̵e	many
ka'lami	neck
ake/akutu	new
akelmeisi	old
mekwa	one
a'kaifɔ/fɔ	pig
nou	rain
wamo	rat
kařinei	sand
yelia nɔpo	short
fɔ'yəni	tail
sawi	taro
you'wei	vine
akaipəsi	wallaby
a'sei	water
kařu	yam
nɔifi	yesterday
