= Siawi language =

Arai–Samaia language of Papua New Guinea

Siawi
- Musan
- Siafli
- Native to: Papua New Guinea
- Region: Sandaun Province: Sandaun Province of Papua New Guinea in Amanab and Rocky Peak Districts, south of the Upper Sepik River, toward the headwaters of the Left May River on the Samaia River east of Amto
- Native speakers: 220 (2007)
- Language family: Arai–Samaia: Amto–Musan (Samaia); Siawi

Language codes
- ISO 639-3: mmp
- Glottolog: siaw1243
- ELP: Siawi
- Coordinates: 4.062998°S 141.421181°E

Siawi, also known as Musan, is one of two Amto–Musan (Samaia River) languages. It is spoken in Siawi village (4.062998°S 141.421181°E), Green River Rural LLG, Sandaun Province, Papua New Guinea.

The name "Siawi" is misspelling of the endonym, Siafli, used on government maps. The old name for the language, "Musan", is a clan name.

== Grammar ==
Siawi has postpositions and SV basic word order.There is a clause final polar interrogative particle.
