= Namia language =

Sepik language spoken in Papua New Guinea

Namia
- Native to: Papua New Guinea
- Region: Namea Rural LLG in Sandaun Province; East Sepik Province
- Native speakers: 6,000 (2007)
- Language family: Sepik: Yellow River; Namia

Language codes
- ISO 639-3: nnm
- Glottolog: nami1256
- ELP: Namia

Namia (Namie, Nemia) is a Sepik language spoken in Namea Rural LLG, Sandaun Province, Papua New Guinea. It goes by various names, such as Edawapi, Lujere, Yellow River. Language use is "vigorous" (Ethnologue).

In Sandaun Province, it is spoken in Ameni (3.981559°S 141.766186°E), Edwaki, Iwane (3.906643°S 141.755439°E), Lawo, Pabei (3.927006°S 141.776325°E), and Panewai villages in Namea Rural LLG, and in the Wiyari area. It is also spoken in 19 villages of Yellow River District in East Sepik Province.

== Dialects ==
Namie dialect groups are:

- Ailuaki: spoken in Yegarapi (3.870583°S 141.800527°E), Yaru (3.85512°S 141.802378°E), and Norambalip (3.814045°S 141.828438°E) villages
- Amani: spoken in Augwom (3.99286°S 141.716817°E), Iwani (3.906643°S 141.755439°E), Pabei (3.927006°S 141.776325°E), Panewai, and Tipas (3.981559°S 141.766186°E) villages
- Wiari: spoken in Alai (3.910948°S 141.797074°E), Nami (3.896557°S 141.879322°E), Worikori (3.923558°S 141.879066°E), Akwom (3.938724°S 141.833174°E), and Naum (3.923731°S 141.833466°E) villages
- Lawo: spoken in Mokwidami (3.858705°S 141.744059°E), Mantopai (3.708668°S 141.698706°E), Yawari (3.676068°S 141.729295°E), and Aiendami (3.944326°S 141.806744°E) villages

== Phonology ==
Namia has only 7 phonemic consonants:

Namia consonant inventory
| | Labial | Alveolar | Velar |
|---|---|---|---|
| Plosive | p | t | k |
| Nasal | m | n | |
| Tap | | r | |
| Lateral | | l | |

Some analyses present /tʃ/ as an eighth phoneme, although its distribution is predictable. [tʃ] and in some cases /r/ are positional variants of /t/, as described in the table below.

Distribution of oral coronal phones in Namia
| Environment | Phones | | | Examples |
| Environment | Attested | In variation | Unattested | Examples |
|---|---|---|---|---|
| # _ | [t], [l] | [t~r] | *[tʃ] | [tip] 'basket', [lip] 'ditch' |
| _ # | [r], [l] | | *[t], *[tʃ] | [er] 'we two', [el] 'woman' |
| [i u] _ | [tʃ], [r], [l] | | *[t] | [titʃei] 'stone', [irei] 'digging stick', [ilei] 'name' |
| [e ə o a] _ | [r], [l] | | *[tʃ], *[t] | [ari] 'already', [alu] 'branch' |
| V _ C V | [r], [l] | | *[tʃ], *[t] | [irno] 'face', [ilpok] 'storm front' |
| V C _ V | [r], [l], [t] | | *[tʃ] | [amral] 'width', [amtou] 'red pandanus', [emomle] 'awaken' |

Word-initially [r] may be heard in place of expected [t] in rapid speech if the previous word ends in a vowel. In no environment do more than three phonemes contrast, meaning that a fourth oral coronal /tʃ/ is not required. [tʃ] only occurs following high vowels /i/ or /u/ (e.g. [putʃwapu] 'lazy') where it can be seen as an allophone of /t/. In most environments only two phonemes contrast, suggesting that /r/ only recently diverged from /t/.

There are 6 vowels in Namia:

| | Front | Central | Back |
|---|---|---|---|
| Close | i | | u |
| Mid | e | ə | o |
| Open | a | | |

The glides [j w] occur as allophones of /i u/, e.g. /iapu/ [japu] 'Sepik river', /uəla/ → [wəla] 'house'.

== Grammar ==
Unlike other Sepik languages, Namia has an inclusive-exclusive distinction for the first-person pronoun, which could possibly be due to diffusion from Torricelli languages. Inclusive-exclusive first-person pronominal distinctions are also found in the Yuat languages and Grass languages.

== Vocabulary ==
The following basic vocabulary words are from Foley (2005) and Laycock (1968), as cited in the Trans-New Guinea database:

| gloss | Namia |
|---|---|
| head | magu |
| ear | mak |
| eye | eno |
| nose | nəmala; nɨmala |
| tooth | pinarɨ; pinarə |
| tongue | lar |
| leg | liː; lipala |
| louse | nanpeu |
| dog | ar; ara |
| pig | lwae |
| bird | eyu |
| egg | puna |
| blood | norə |
| bone | lak |
| skin | urarə |
| breast | mu |
| tree | mi |
| man | lu |
| woman | ere |
| sun | wuluwa |
| moon | yem |
| water | ijo; ito |
| fire | ipi |
| stone | lijei |
| name | ilei |
| eat | (t) |
| one | tipia |
| two | pəli |
