= Wanib Sign Language =

Reported sign language

- Native to: Papua New Guinea
- Region: southern Toricelli Range
- Language family: village sign?

Language codes
- ISO 639-3: None (mis)
- Glottolog: wani1243

Wanib Sign Language is a reported sign language, possibly a village sign language, in a Heyo-speaking community of Papua New Guinea. It's spoken just to the west of Mehek Sign Language, but the two languages reflect the very different spoken languages of their communities: Wanib SL follows the SVO word order of Heyo, whereas Mehek SL follows the SOV word order of Mehek.
