= Pahi language =

Sepik language of Papua-New Guinea

Pahi
- Lugitama
- Region: Sandaun Province
- Native speakers: (840 cited 2000 census)
- Language family: Sepik: Tama; Pahi

Language codes
- ISO 639-3: lgt
- Glottolog: pahi1246
- ELP: Pahi

Pahi, or Lugitama (also Riahoma, Wansum), is a Sepik language of Sandaun Province, Papua-New Guinea.
