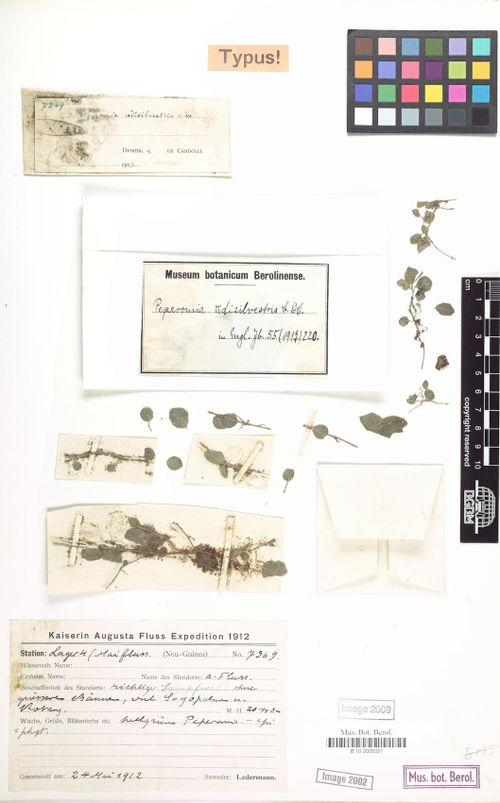

Scientific classification
- Kingdom: Plantae
- Clade: Tracheophytes
- Clade: Angiosperms
- Clade: Magnoliids
- Order: Piperales
- Family: Piperaceae
- Genus: Peperomia
- Species: P. udisilvestris

Binomial name
- Peperomia udisilvestris C.DC.

= Peperomia udisilvestris =

Species of epiphyte

Peperomia udisilvestris is a species of epiphyte from the genus Peperomia. It was first described by Casimir de Candolle and published in the book "Botanische Jahrbücher fur Systematik, Pflanzengeschichte und Pflanzengeographie.".

== Distribution ==
It is endemic to New Guinea.

- Indonesia
  - Nouvelle-Guinée
- Papua New Guinea
  - May River
