= Wogamush River =

River in Papua New Guinea

Wogamush River Wogamus River
- Location within Papua New Guinea

Location
- Country: Papua New Guinea
- Region: East Sepik Province

Physical characteristics
- Source
  - location: Papua New Guinea
- Mouth
  - coordinates: 4°19′53″S 142°21′36″E

The Wogamush River (or Wogamus River) is a river in northern Papua New Guinea. It is located in East Sepik Province (East Sepik). The Wogamus languages are spoken along the banks of the river.

== See also ==
- List of rivers of Papua New Guinea
- Wogamus languages
- Wogamusin language
