= Iwam language =

Language of Papua New Guinea

May River Iwam
- Region: East Sepik Province
- Native speakers: (3,000 cited 1998)
- Language family: Sepik: Upper Sepik; Iwam; May River Iwam

Language codes
- ISO 639-3: iwm
- Glottolog: iwam1256
- ELP: May River Iwam

May River Iwam, often simply referred to as Iwam, is a language of East Sepik Province, Papua New Guinea.

It is spoken in Iyomempwi (4.24117°S 141.89271°E), Mowi (4.294971°S 141.929199°E), and Premai villages of Tunap/Hunstein Rural LLG in East Sepik Province, and other villages on the May River.

== Phonology ==
=== Vowels ===
Vowels
	Front	Central	Back
Close	i		u
Mid	e	ə	o
Open		a	

In non-final positions, /u/ /o/, /i/, and /e/ are [ʊ] [ɔ], [ɪ], and [ɛ], respectively. /ə/ appears only in nonfinal syllables. When adjacent to nasal consonants, vowels are nasalized; nasalization may also occur when adjacent to word boundaries.

=== Consonants ===
Consonants
	Bilabial	Alveolar	Palatal	Velar	Glottal
Nasal	m	n		ŋ	
Plosive	p	t		k	
Fricative		s			h
Flap		r			
Semivowel			j	w	

/p/ and /k/ are voiced fricatives ([β] and [ɣ]) respectively) when intervocalic and unreleased when final (/t/ is also unreleased when final). /ŋ/ is a nasal flap ([ɾ̃]) word-initially and between vowels. /s/ is [ts] initially and may otherwise be palatalized [sʲ]. Sequences of any consonant and /w/ are neutralized before /u/ where an offglide is always heard.

=== Phonotactics ===
Bilabial and velar consonants and /n/ may be followed by /w/ when initial. Other initial clusters include /pr/, /kr/, /hr/, /hw/, and /hn/ and final clusters are /w/ or /j/ followed by any consonant except for /h/ or /ŋ/.

== Pronouns ==
May River Iwam pronouns:

	sg	du	pl
1	ka/ani	kərər	kərəm
2	ki	kor	kom
3m	si	sor	səm
3f	sa	sor	səm

== Noun classes ==
Like the Wogamus languages, May River Iwam has five noun classes:

class	semantic category	prefix	example
class 1	male human referents	nu- (adult males); ru- (uninitiated or immature males)	yenkam nu-t man class.1-one ‘one man’
class 2	female human, children, or other animate referents	a(o)-	owi a-ois duck class.2-two ‘two ducks’
class 3	large objects	kwu-	ana kwu-(o)t hand class.3-one ‘a big hand’
class 4	small objects	ha-	ana ha-(o)t hand class.4-one ‘a small hand’
class 5	long objects	hwu-	ana hwu-(o)t hand class.5-one ‘a long hand’

As shown by the example above for ana ‘hand’, a noun can take on different classes depending on the physical characteristics being emphasized.

== Verbal morphology ==
May river Iwam has four periodic tense suffixes: matutinal -yok, diurnal -harok, postmeridial -tep and nocturnal -wae.

== Vocabulary ==
The following basic vocabulary words of Iwam are from Foley (2005) and Laycock (1968), as cited in the Trans-New Guinea database:

gloss	Iwam
head	mu
ear	wun
eye	nu
nose	nomwos
tooth	piknu
tongue	kwane
leg	wərku; wɨrku
louse	ŋən; nɨn
dog	nwa
pig	hu
bird	owit
egg	yen
blood	ni
bone	keew; kew
skin	pəw
breast	muy
tree	pae(kap); paykap
man	kam; yen-kam
woman	wik
sun	pi
moon	pwan
water	op; o(p)
fire	pay
stone	siya
eat	(n)ai; (nd)ai
one	oe; ruk; su
two	ŋwis
