= Hewa language =

Sepik language of Papua New Guinea

Hewa
- Native to: Papua New Guinea
- Region: Sepik River basin
- Ethnicity: Hewa
- Native speakers: 4,800 (2014)
- Language family: Sepik: Sepik Hill; Southwest; Hewa

Language codes
- ISO 639-3: ham
- Glottolog: hewa1241
- ELP: Hewa

Hewa, also known as Sisimin and Lagaip, is spoken by the Hewa people. It is a Sepik language of northern Papua New Guinea. It is spoken in Lagaip Rural LLG of Enga Province, and also in Hela Province and Telefomin Rural LLG of Sandaun Province.
