= AYQ =

AYQ or ayq may refer to:

- Ayers Rock Airport, Northern Territory, Australia (by IATA code)
- Ayi language, Sandaun Province, Papua New Guinea (by ISO 639-3 code)
