= KMN (disambiguation) =

KMN may refer to:

- ISO 639-3 code for the Awtuw language, a Sepik language in Papua New Guinea
- Postal code for Comino Island, Malta (Maltese: Kemmuna)
- Kamina Airport, the IATA code KMN
- kmn, a stage name of Heikki Saari (, Finnish drummer and musician
- Pinyin code for Kunming South railway station
- Order of the Defender of the Realm, a Malaysian federal award
