= Sanio language =

Sepik language of Papua New Guinea

Sanio
- Hiowe
- Native to: Papua New Guinea
- Region: East Sepik Province
- Native speakers: (1,300 cited 2000 census)
- Language family: Sepik: Sepik Hill; Sanio
- Dialects: Saniyo; Hiyowe

Language codes
- ISO 639-3: sny
- Glottolog: sani1270
- ELP: Saniyo-Hiyewe

Sanio, or more precisely Saniyo-Hiyewe, is a Sepik language of Tunap/Hunstein Rural LLG in East Sepik Province, northern Papua New Guinea. It is also spoken in Telefomin Rural LLG, Sandaun Province.

== Dialects ==
Dialects are:

- Hiyowe dialect, spoken in Maposi village (4.547475°S 142.220638°E) of Tunap-Hunstein Rural LLG
- Saniyo dialect, spoken in Hanasi (4.523215°S 142.375861°E), Malapute’e (4.58544°S 142.33631°E), Pukapuki, Salunapi (4.551342°S 142.343271°E), and Sio (4.450431°S 142.316392°E) villages of Tunap-Hunstein Rural LLG

== Phonology ==
Consonants
	Labial	Alveolar	Palatal	Velar	Glottal
Plosive	p	t		k	ʔ ⟨'⟩
Fricative	ɸ ⟨f⟩	s			h
Nasal	m	n			
Approximant	w	r	j		

- /r/ has the allophone [l] word-initially, which is written with the separate character ⟨l⟩.
- /ʔ/ only appears intervocalically.

Vowels
	Front	Central	Back
High	i		u
Mid-high	e ⟨ei⟩		o
Mid-low	ɛ ⟨e⟩		
Low		a	

- /ɛ/ is pronounced [ei] before /j/. In this case it is written as ⟨ei⟩.

Additionally, the following diphthongs can be found: /ai/, /au/, /ou/.
