= Karawa =

Karawa may refer to:

- Garrwa language, a Garawan language of Australia
- Karawa language, a Sepik language of Papua New Guinea
- Karawa, Central African Republic
- Qarawat Bani Hassan
- Qarawat Bani Zeid
