= BJH =

BJH or bjh may refer to:

- Barclay James Harvest, an English progressive rock band
- Big Jack Horner
- BJH, the IATA code for Bajhang Airport, Sudurpashchim Province, Nepal
- bjh, the ISO 639-3 code for Bahinemo language, East Sepik Province, Papua New Guinea
