= Abau language =

Papuan language of Papua New Guinea

Abau
- Native to: Papua New Guinea
- Region: Sandaun Province
- Native speakers: 7,500 (2008 census)
- Language family: Sepik: Upper Sepik; Abau
- Writing system: Latin

Language codes
- ISO 639-3: aau
- Glottolog: abau1245
- ELP: Abau

Abau is a Papuan language spoken in southern Sandaun Province of Papua New Guinea, primarily along the border with Indonesia.

In 2002, there were estimated to be between 4,500 and 5,000 speakers, and this number does not appear to have declined since the first accurate count in the 1970s.

Abau is reported to have whistled speech.

== Phonology ==
Abau has the simplest phonemic inventory in the Sepik language family.

Vowels
| | Front | Back |
|---|---|---|
| Close | i | u |
| Close-mid | e | o |
| Open | | ɑ |

Consonants
| | Bilabial | Alveolar | Palatal | Velar | Glottal |
|---|---|---|---|---|---|
| Nasal | m | n | | | |
| Plosive | p | | | k | |
| Fricative | | s | | | h |
| Flap | | ɾ | | | |
| Semivowel | | | j | w | |

== Pronouns ==
Pronouns are:

| | | Singular | Dual | Plural |
|---|---|---|---|---|
| First | | ha ~ han | hror | hrom |
| Second | | hwon ~ hun | hoh | hom |
| Third | Masculine | hiy ~ hi | hoh | hom |
| Third | Feminine | hok | hoh | hom |

The dual and plural numbers only distinguish between first person and non-first person. Also, the third-person gender distinction exists only for the singular, but not the dual or plural forms.

== Noun classes ==
Abau noun classes are:

Abau noun classes
| class | formal marker | semantics |
|---|---|---|
| class 1 | pru | human, spirits |
| class 2 | k(a)- | animals and default |
| class 3 | na | small objects with some volume |
| class 4 | s(i)- | flat surface objects |
| class 5 | pi | long thin objects |
| class 6 | u | geographical locations |
| class 7 | i | flat objects with little volume |
| class 8 | ri | certain types of trees |
| class 9 | ein(d)- | bundles of long uncut items |
| class 10 | reik | temporal |
| class 11 | hnaw | bundles of long cut items |
| class 12 | houk- | part of a long object |

Nouns can take on different class affixes depending on the physical characteristics being emphasized. Examples:

su ‘coconut’

- su pi-ron /coconut class.5-one/ ‘a coconut palm’
- su ka-mon /coconut class.2-one/ ‘a coconut’

pey ‘sugarcane’

- pey pi-ron /sugarcane class.5-one/ ‘one stalk of uncut sugarcane’
- pey houk-mon /sugarcane class.12-one/ ‘one piece of sugarcane’
- pey eind-mon /sugarcane class.9-one/ ‘bundle of stored stalks of sugarcane’
- pey hnaw-mon /sugarcane class.11-one/ ‘one bundle of sugarcane ready for transport’

Like most other Sepik languages, Abau overtly marks grammatical gender (see Sepik languages#Gender). The same object can be classified as either masculine or feminine, depending on the physical characteristics intended for emphasis. Example:

youk ‘paddle’

- youk se ‘paddle M.DAT’ (focuses on the length of the paddle)
- youk ke ‘paddle F.DAT’ (focuses on the flat nature of the two-dimensional paddle blade)

== Verbal morphology ==
Abau had three periodic tense suffixes: diurnal -kok, postmeridial -ropay and nocturnal -nayr

== Vocabulary ==
The following basic vocabulary words are from Foley (2005) and Laycock (1968), as cited in the Trans-New Guinea database:

| gloss | Abau |
|---|---|
| head | makwe |
| ear | nwek |
| eye | nane; nanɛ |
| nose | kasan |
| tooth | nas |
| tongue | sane; sanɛ |
| leg | sune; sunɛ |
| louse | mapru |
| dog | nwɔf; nwɔhɔ |
| pig | fwok |
| bird | ahnɛ |
| egg | ne |
| blood | nyoh |
| bone | ayo; i |
| skin | ohi |
| breast | mu |
| tree | no; nɔw |
| man | lu; or; ur |
| woman | sa |
| sun | e; ey |
| moon | yen; yeny |
| water | fu; hu |
| fire | ya |
| stone | məny |
| name | uru |
| eat | ra |
| one | mun; rin |
| two | pris |
