= Kalou =

Kalou may refer to:

- 23663 Kalou, a main-belt asteroid
- Bonaventure Kalou (born 1978), Ivorian footballer
- Kalou language, a language of Papua-New Guinea
- Ol Kalou, a town in Kenya
- Ol Kalou Constituency, an electoral constituency in Kenya
- Salomon Kalou (born 1985), Ivorian footballer
- Sekonaia Kalou (born 1984), Fijian rugby player
