= Karawa language =

Endangered Sepik language of Papua New Guinea

Karawa
- Native to: Papua New Guinea
- Region: Sandaun Province
- Native speakers: 63 (2003)
- Language family: Sepik languages: Ram; Karawa

Language codes
- ISO 639-3: xrw
- Glottolog: kara1495
- ELP: Karawa
- Coordinates: 3.665801°S 142.014408°E

Karawa (Bulawa) is a language spoken in Sandaun Province, Papua New Guinea, by decreasing number of people. Speakers are shifting to Pouye, which is closely related (67% similar lexically). It is spoken in the single village of Pulwa (Bulawa) (3.665801°S 142.014408°E) in East Wapei Rural LLG, Sandaun Province.
