= Wagu language =

Sepik language of Papua New Guinea

Wagu
- Native to: Papua New Guinea
- Region: East Sepik Province
- Language family: Sepik: Bahinemo; Wagu

Language codes
- ISO 639-3: None (mis)
- Glottolog: wagu1234

Wagu is a Sepik language spoken in East Sepik Province, Papua-New Guinea.
