= Ama language =

Ama may refer to:

- Ama language (New Guinea)
- Ama language (Sudan)
