= Nigilu language =

Language spoken in Papua-New Guinea

Nigilu
- Native to: Papua New Guinea
- Region: East Sepik Province
- Language family: Sepik: Bahinemo; Nigilu

Language codes
- ISO 639-3: None (mis)
- Glottolog: nigi1241

Nigilu is a Sepik language spoken in East Sepik Province, Papua-New Guinea.
