= Gawi Rural LLG =

Local-level government in Papua New Guinea

- Location within Papua New Guinea
- Coordinates: 4.056899°S 143.029677°E
- Country: Papua New Guinea
- Province: East Sepik Province
- Time zone: UTC+10 (AEST)

Gawi Rural LLG is a local-level government (LLG) of East Sepik Province, Papua New Guinea. Sepik Hill languages are spoken in this LLG.

== Wards ==
- 01. Sapande
- 02. Yamanumbu
- 03. Pagwi
- 04. Sapanaut
- 05. Yenjinmangua
- 06. Nyaurange
- 07. Kandinge
- 08. Korogu
- 09. Sotmeri
- 10. Indabu
- 11. Yenchen
- 12. Kanganamun
- 13. Tegowi
- 14. Parambei
- 15. Maringei
- 16. Aibom
- 17. Wombun
- 18. Indinge
- 19. Kirimbit
- 20. Luluk
- 21. Timbunmeri
- 22. Changriman
- 23. Mari (Mari language (Sepik) speakers)
- 24. Yembiyembi (Bisis language speakers)
- 25. Paliagwi

== Sources ==
- OCHA FISS (2018). "Papua New Guinea administrative level 0, 1, 2, and 3 population statistics and gazetteer". Humanitarian Data Exchange. 1.31.9.
- United Nations in Papua New Guinea (2018). "Papua New Guinea Village Coordinates Lookup". Humanitarian Data Exchange. 1.31.9.
