= Mari language (Sepik) =

Sepik language of Papua New Guinea

Mari
- Native to: Papua New Guinea
- Region: East Sepik Province
- Native speakers: (80 cited 2000)
- Language family: Sepik: Bahinemo; Mari

Language codes
- ISO 639-3: mbx
- Glottolog: mari1432
- ELP: Mari
- Coordinates: 4.3449°S 143.063548°E

Mari is an endangered Sepik language spoken in East Sepik Province, Papua New Guinea.

Mari is not used by many children. Although Mari is a language known only by approximately eighty people, it is spoken only within the home. It is spoken in Mari village (4.3449°S 143.063548°E) of Gawi Rural LLG, East Sepik Province.

Recordings of scriptures in the tongue of Mari can be found on the website of the Global Recordings Network, a non-profit organization dedicated to translating Biblical canon and songs into endangered languages and dialects in audio format.
