= Sumariup language =

Sepik language spoken in Papua New Guinea

Sumariup
- Native to: Papua New Guinea
- Region: East Sepik Province
- Native speakers: (80 cited 1993)
- Language family: Sepik: Bahinemo; Sumariup

Language codes
- ISO 639-3: siv
- Glottolog: suma1269
- ELP: Sumariup
- Coordinates: 4.725709°S 143.253249°E

Sumariup is a Sepik language spoken in East Sepik Province, Papua New Guinea. It is spoken in the single village of Latoma (4.725709°S 143.253249°E) in Karawari Rural LLG, East Sepik Province.
