= AKQ =

AKQ or akq may refer to:

- Prince M. Bunyamin Air Force Base, Lampung, Indonesia (IATA code "AKQ")
- Ak language, Sandaun Province, Papua New Guinea (ISO 639-3 code "akq")
