= PSQ =

PSQ or psq may refer to:

- Political Science Quarterly, an American double blind peer-reviewed academic journal
- PSQ, the IATA code for Philadelphia Seaplane Base, Essington, Pennsylvania, United States
- psq, the ISO 639-3 code for Pasi language, Sandaun Province, Papua New Guinea
