= Pyu language (Papuan) =

Language isolate spoken in Papua New Guinea and Indonesia

Pyu
- Native to: Papua New Guinea; Indonesia
- Region: Green River Rural LLG in Sandaun Province; Pegunungan Bintang Regency in Highland Papua
- Native speakers: 250 (2012 census)
- Language family: Arai–Samaia or Language isolate: Pyu

Language codes
- ISO 639-3: pby
- Glottolog: pyuu1245
- ELP: Pyu
- Coordinates: 4.019117°S 141.033561°E

Pyu is a language isolate spoken in Papua New Guinea and Indonesia. As of 2000, the language had about 100 speakers in Papua New Guinea. It is spoken in Biake No. 2 village (4.019117°S 141.033561°E) of Biake ward, Green River Rural LLG in Sandaun Province. Additionally, there are about 150 speakers in Batom District, Pegunungan Bintang Regency, Highland Papua, Indonesia.

== Classification ==
Timothy Usher links the Pyu language to its neighbors, the Left May languages and the Amto–Musan languages, in as Arai–Samaia stock.

An automated computational analysis (ASJP 4) by Müller et al. (2013) found lexical similarities with Kimki. However, since the analysis was automatically generated, the grouping could be either due to mutual lexical borrowing or genetic inheritance.

Based on limited lexical evidence, Pyu had been linked to the putative Kwomtari–Fas family, but that family is apparently spurious and Foley (2018) notes that Pyu and Kwomtari are highly divergent from each other. Some similar pronouns are found in both Kwomtari and Pyu:

| pronoun | Pyu | Kwomtari |
|---|---|---|
| ‘1PL, we’ | məla | mena |
| ‘2SG, you (sg)’ | no | une |
| ‘3, he/she/it/they’ | na | nane |

== Vocabulary ==
The following basic vocabulary words are from Conrad & Dye (1975) and Voorhoeve (1975), as cited in the Trans-New Guinea database:

| gloss | Pyu |
|---|---|
| head | uǏiʔ; wiri |
| hair | Ǐɩsiʔ; lisi |
| ear | kweɛ |
| eye | bəmeʔ; pɛmɛʔɛ |
| nose | tɛpʌǏi |
| tooth | rəne |
| tongue | asaguʔ |
| louse | ni; niʔ |
| dog | naguʔ; nakwu |
| pig | we; wɛʔ |
| bird | maǏuǏiʔ; maru |
| egg | Ǐio taʔ; taʔ |
| blood | ɛmiʔ; kami |
| bone | bəli; bɩǏiʔ |
| skin | kagole; kʌkʌǏɛʔ |
| breast | ib̶iʔ |
| tree | ga; ka |
| man | tali; taliʔ |
| woman | Ǐomæʔ |
| sun | agwiʔ |
| water | ʔiʔ; yi |
| fire | kamie; kʌmæ |
| stone | siri; sɩliʔ |
| road, path | ʔonæ; ʔonɛ |
| eat | waŋgɛʔ |
| one | tefiye; tɛᵽiɛʔ |
| two | kasi |
