= Yellow River (Papua New Guinea) =

River in Papua New Guinea

Yellow River Yani River
- Location within Papua New Guinea

Location
- Country: Papua New Guinea
- Region: Sandaun Province

Physical characteristics
- Source
  - location: Papua New Guinea
- Mouth
  - coordinates: 3°59′30″S 141°43′23″E

The Yellow River is a river in northern Papua New Guinea.

== See also ==
- List of rivers of Papua New Guinea
- Yellow River languages
