= Yessan-Mayo language =

Papuan language of Papua New Guinea

Yessan-Mayo
- Yamano
- Region: East Sepik Province, Papua New Guinea
- Native speakers: (2,000 cited 2000 census)
- Language family: Sepik: Tama; Yessan-Mayo

Language codes
- ISO 639-3: yss
- Glottolog: yess1239
- ELP: Yessan-Mayo

Yessan-Mayo (also known as Yesan, Mayo, and natively known as Yamano) is a Papuan language spoken by 2000 people in Papua New Guinea. It is spoken in Maio (4.21379°S 142.675929°E) and Yessan (4.219025°S 142.66658°E) villages of Yessan ward, Ambunti Rural LLG, East Sepik Province.

== Phonology ==
The phonology of Yessan-Mayo is described in Foley (2018) as such:

=== Vowels ===
	Front	Central	Back
Close		ɨ	
Mid		ə	ɔ
Open	a		

=== Consonants ===
		Bilabial	Alveolar	Palatal	Velar		Glottal
		Bilabial	Alveolar	Palatal	plain	labialized	Glottal
Plosive	plain		t		k	kʷ	
Plosive	prenasalized	ᵐb	ⁿd		ᵑg	ᵑgʷ	
Fricative		ɸ	s				h
Nasal		m	n				
Trill			r				
Approximant			l	j		w	

== Pronouns ==
Foreman (1974) describes two kinds of pronouns in Yessan-Mayo: non-emphatic and emphatic pronouns.

In addition to the non-emphatic pronouns, there is also the reflexive pronoun kwarara (self), as well as the demonstrative pronouns op (this) and otop (that).

=== Non-emphatic ===
		singular	dual	plural
1st person		an	nis	nim
2nd person		ni	kep	kom
3rd person	male	ri	rip	rim
3rd person	female	ti	rip	rim

=== Emphatic ===
		singular	dual	plural
1st person		arin	nisis	nirim
2nd person		nirin	kerip	kerim
3rd person	male	atar	atep	atem
3rd person	female	atat	atep	atem
