= Pasi language =

Sepik language of Papua-New Guinea

Pasi
- Region: Sandaun Province (3 villages)
- Native speakers: (360 cited 2000 census)
- Language family: Sepik: Tama; Pasi

Language codes
- ISO 639-3: psq
- Glottolog: pasi1259
- ELP: Pasi

Pasi is a Sepik language of Sandaun Province, Papua New Guinea.
