= Mawase Rural LLG =

Local-level government in Papua New Guinea

- Location within Papua New Guinea
- Coordinates: 3.674233°S 142.482153°E
- Country: Papua New Guinea
- Province: Sandaun Province
- City: Nuku
- Time zone: UTC+10 (AEST)

Mawase Rural LLG is a local-level government (LLG) of Sandaun Province, Papua New Guinea. A wide variety of Torricelli languages are spoken in this LLG.

== Wards ==
- 01. Seleput
- 02. Nuku
- 03. Mantsuku
- 04. Yiminum
- 05. Ifkindu
- 06. Wilwil
- 07. Kaflei
- 08. Kaflei 3
- 09. Arkosame 1
- 10. Arkosame 2
- 11. Hambasama
- 12. Angara
- 13. Abigu
- 14. Usitamu
- 15. Hambanori
- 16. Engiep
- 17. Wombiu
- 21. Wulbowe
- 22. Tukinaro
- 28. Yilwombuk
- 29. Arkosome 3
- 30. Yirwondi
- 31. Sepitala
- 32. Suau
