= Amal language =

Sepik language spoken in Papua New Guinea

Amal
- Region: Sandaun Province and East Sepik Province
- Native speakers: 830 (2003)
- Language family: Sepik: Upper Sepik; Amal–Kalou; Amal

Language codes
- ISO 639-3: aad
- Glottolog: amal1242
- ELP: Amal

Amal is a language spoken along the border of Sandaun Province and East Sepik Province, Papua New Guinea, along the Wagana River near the confluence with Wanibe Creek. Foley (2018) classifies Amal as a primary branch of the Sepik languages, though it is quite close to Kalou.

== Pronouns ==
Pronouns are:

Amal pronouns
	sg	pl
1	ŋan	nut
2	in	kun
3	may	ilum

== Cognates ==
Amal cognates with Sepik languages are:

- tal ‘woman’
- yan ‘child’
- lal ‘tongue’ < proto-Sepik *ta(w)r
- mi ‘breast’ < proto-Sepik *muk
- waplo ‘liver’
- nip ‘blood’
- yen ‘egg’
- ak ‘house’

Foley (2018) notes that there appears to be somewhat more lexical similarities between Amal and the Tama languages, but does not consider them to form a group with each other.

== Vocabulary ==
The following basic vocabulary words of Amal are from Laycock (1968), as cited in the Trans-New Guinea database:

gloss	Amal
head	makələ
ear	marj
eye	nai
nose	yimeʔ
tooth	pu
tongue	lal
leg	lü
louse	ŋin
dog	wun
bird	yok
egg	yen
blood	niːp
bone	nəŋolak
skin	puːk
breast	m
tree	piːt
man	wul
woman	tal
sun	mwak
moon	yimal
water	iːp
fire	waː
stone	tipal
two	kila
