= Pagwi =

- Village
- Location within Papua New Guinea
- Coordinates: 4°3′S 143°2′E
- Country: Papua New Guinea
- Province: East Sepik Province
- LLG: Gawi Rural LLG
- Time zone: UTC+10 (AEST)

Pagwi is a village and township on the Sepik River in Gawi Rural LLG of East Sepik Province, Papua New Guinea, north-east of Ambunti. Linked by road to Wewak, about 4 or 5 hours away on the coast, the Chambri Lakes are nearby to the south. It contains little more than some dilapidated government buildings and a few basic guesthouses such as Yamanumbo Guesthouse. Pagwi Council House is described as "hardly impressive", but its "handsomely carved posts inside" are noted. There have been numerous land disputes and conflicts in the area.
