= Ram languages =

Language family spoken in Papua New Guinea

Ram
- Geographic distribution: central Sandaun Province, Papua New Guinea
- Linguistic classification: Sepik: Upper Sepik; Ram
- Subdivisions: Karawa; Pouye; Awtuw

Language codes
- Glottolog: ramm1241
- The Sepik languages as classified by Foley (2018)

The Ram languages are a small group of 3 languages spoken in Sandaun Province, Papua New Guinea. They are spoken directly to the northeast of the Yellow River languages and directly to the south of the Wapei languages, both of which are also Sepik groups. Ram is the word for 'man' in the languages that make up this group.

The languages are,

- Awtuw
- Karawa–Pouye
  - Karawa
  - Pouye (Bouye)

They are classified among the Sepik languages of northern Papua New Guinea.

Awtuw is the best documented Ram language.

== Pronouns ==
The pronouns Ross reconstructs for proto-Ram are:

| I | *wan | we two | (*na-n) | we | *na-m |
| thou | *yɨ-n | you two | (*yɨ-n/*a-n) | you | *yɨ-m/*a-m |
| he | *ra (*atə-) | they two | (*ra-p, *atə-) | they | (*ra-m, *atə-m) |
| she | (*ta-i) | they two | (*ra-p, *atə-) | they | (*ra-m, *atə-m) |

== Vocabulary comparison ==
The following basic vocabulary words are from Laycock (1968) and Foley (2005), as cited in the Trans-New Guinea database.

The words cited constitute translation equivalents, whether they are cognate (e.g. nipia, nipikəm for “louse”) or not (e.g. nəpay, aukwə for “dog”).

| gloss | Awtuw | Karawa | Pouye |
|---|---|---|---|
| head | makəlak | moulaka | nouraka |
| ear | maːna; nane | maklaka | maroalaka |
| eye | new; nü | noulaka | nowar |
| nose | witil; wutil | waklaka | wolokə |
| tooth | pilak; piylake | pilaka | piyapa |
| tongue | lale; laːlə | laləpi | laləmu |
| leg | riiwe; riwe | lalə | lalə |
| louse | nin | nipia | nipikəm |
| dog | piːrən; piyren | nəpay | aukwə |
| pig | yaw | | |
| bird | yi | awra | yio |
| egg | paŋkə; wate | waːtə | warə |
| blood | aipi | eipi | aywi |
| bone | lake; lakər | lakə | lakə |
| skin | yai | mouwil | nəpyei |
| breast | muy; mwi | məy | muy |
| tree | tau; taw | tau | tau |
| man | rame; ramiyan | yaŋkai | lamo |
| woman | taləran | telou | tʔlum |
| sun | mæy; may | may | taliyə |
| moon | yelmek; yilmake | yalma | yalma |
| water | yiw; yüw | you | you |
| fire | tapo; tapwo | tapo | tapo |
| stone | til | tidi | tɨl |
| name | yenyiy | | |
| eat | ra | | |
| one | naydowo | | |
| two | yikir | yikəramo | yikən |

== Morphology ==
Awtuw (Feldman 1983) and Pouye present many morphological commonalities: they share cognate prefixes in six out of eight prefixal slots, but on the other hand they present very little cognate material in their suffixal chain.

Ram languages have a rich verbal morphology, which can encode unusual categories such as celerative -imya 'quickly', grammaticalized from the verb imya 'run' as in (1), periodic tense and simulative.

Rey aeye rokr’-imy’-e.
3sg:MASC food cook-CELER-PST
'He cooked the food quickly.' (Feldman 1983: 122–123)
