= Bahinemo languages =

Bahinemo
- Central Sepik Hill
- Geographic distribution: Sepik River basin, Papua New Guinea
- Linguistic classification: Sepik: Sepik Hill; Bahinemo

Language codes
- Glottolog: cent2234

The Bahinemo languages are a small family of closely related languages of northern Papua New Guinea. The languages are:

- Bitara (Berinomo), Bahinemo (Gahom), Nigilu, Wagu
- Mari, Bisis, Kapriman (Sare) – Watakataui, Sumariup.

They are classified among the Sepik Hill languages of the Sepik family.
