= Alamblak languages =

Alamblak
- Eastern Sepik Hill
- Geographic distribution: Sepik River basin, Papua New Guinea
- Linguistic classification: Sepik: Sepik Hill; Alamblak
- Subdivisions: Alamblak; Kaningra

Language codes
- Glottolog: east2496

The Alamblak languages are a small family of two closely related languages,

Kaningra and Alamblak.

They are generally classified among the Sepik Hill languages of the Sepik family of northern Papua New Guinea.

== Bibliography ==
- Ross, Malcolm (2005). "Pronouns as a preliminary diagnostic for grouping Papuan languages". In Andrew Pawley; Robert Attenborough; Robin Hide; Jack Golson (eds.). Papuan pasts: cultural, linguistic and biological histories of Papuan-speaking peoples. Canberra: Pacific Linguistics. pp. 15–66. doi:10.15144/PL-572. ISBN 0858835622. OCLC 67292782.
