= Nimo language =

Left May language of Papua New Guinea

Nimo
- Native to: Papua New Guinea
- Region: Sandaun Province
- Native speakers: (350 cited 1998)
- Language family: Arai–Samaia: Left May (Arai); Nimo

Language codes
- ISO 639-3: niw
- Glottolog: nimo1247
- ELP: Nimo

Nimo (Nimo-Wasawai) is a Left May language of Papua New Guinea, in Sandaun Province. Nimo and Wasawai are two of the villages inhabited by speakers of this language. It is close to Nakwi.

It is spoken in Arakau, Binuto, Didipas (4.316471°S 141.54343°E), Fowiom, Nimo (4.315194°S 141.603518°E), Uburu, Uwawi, Wamwiu, Wasuai (4.258869°S 141.559617°E), and Yuwaitri villages, some of which are located in Nino ward, Tunap/Hunstein Rural LLG, East Sepik Province.
