= Wogamus languages =

Languages originating in Papua New Guinea

Wogamus
- Geographic distribution: Wogamush River, western East Sepik Province, in the Upper Sepik River basin of Papua New Guinea
- Linguistic classification: Sepik: Middle Sepik; Tama; Wogamus

Language codes
- Glottolog: woga1248

The Wogamus languages are a pair of closely related languages, Wogamusin and Chenapian.

They are classified among the Sepik languages of northern Papua New Guinea; Malcolm Ross and William A. Foley (2018) place them in the Upper Sepik branch of that family.

The Wogamus languages are spoken along the banks of the Wogamush River and Sepik River in western East Sepik Province, just to the east of the Iwam languages.

== Noun classes ==
Wogamus languages have noun classes reminiscent of those found in Bantu languages. Noun classes in Wogamusin and Chenapian are listed below, with Wogamusin - um 'three' and Chenapian - mu 'three' used as examples.

Class no.	Semantic category	Wogamusin prefix	Chenapian prefix	Wogamusin example	Chenapian example
1	humans	s(i)-	s(i)-	s-um	si-mu
2	higher animals: dogs, pigs, etc.	r-	gw-	r-um	gw-umu
3	plants, trees, vines, etc.	b-	b-	b-um	b-umu
4	no specific pattern	h-	n-	h-um	n-əmu
5	no specific pattern	ŋgw-	kw-	ŋgw-um	kw-umu

== Vocabulary comparison ==
The following basic vocabulary words are from the Trans-New Guinea database. The Wogamusin data is from Foley (2005) and Laycock (1968), and the Chenapian data is from SIL field notes (1983).

The words cited constitute translation equivalents, whether they are cognate (e.g. tawö, taw for "woman") or not (e.g. dəmiaʔ, tetak for "louse").

gloss	Chenapian	Wogamusin
head	toapᵒ; tuwap	towam
hair	taoɛnavon; taunabon	
ear	gwabuo; ugwabə	mam
eye	džinano; ǰinino	li
nose	mɨnɨk; munɩk	boliŋ
tooth	diu; duɨʔ	ndəl; ndɨl
tongue	taun; ton	taliyen
leg	soʷanaup; šonawəp	su
louse	damian; dəmiaʔ	tetak
dog	gwara; ogwara	wal
pig	kᵘo; ku	
bird	džɛosiʔ; ǰɛoši	yah
egg	noə; ṣⁱu no	
blood	ne; nᵊe	noh
bone	dža; ǰa·	rubwi
skin	bɩn; bön	mbe
breast	mu; muʔ	muk
tree	məntəp; montoap	mbotom
man	tama; tamö	tam
woman	tauwo; tawö	taw
sun	džabɨn; ǰaƀan	yam
moon	nu	luh
water	džoʔ; ǰoʔ	yək; yɨk
fire	un	kur
stone	nogɛrao; noguařo	noŋg
road, path	uni	
name	tamgu	
one	nař; sⁱərəʔ	a (M); ed (F)
two	ǰⁱək; nɛsi; ṣiṣi	nwis
