= Arai River =

River in Papua New Guinea

- Location within Papua New Guinea

Location
- Country: Papua New Guinea
- Region: Gulf Province

Physical characteristics
- Source
  - location: Papua New Guinea
- Mouth
  - coordinates: 7°42′00″S 145°02′00″E

The Arai River or May River is a river in southern Papua New Guinea. Various Papuan languages are spoken in the watershed of the May River, including the Iwam language and the Arai–Samaia languages.

== See also ==
- List of rivers of Papua New Guinea
- Arai–Samaia languages
