= Bisis language =

Sepik language of Papua New Guinea

Bisis
- Native to: Papua New Guinea
- Region: East Sepik Province
- Native speakers: 3,500 (2013)
- Language family: Sepik: Bahinemo; Bisis

Language codes
- ISO 639-3: bnw
- Glottolog: bisi1244
- ELP: Bisis
- Coordinates: 4.46974°S 143.144677°E

Bisis is a Sepik language spoken in East Sepik Province, Papua-New Guinea. It is spoken in three villages, including Yembiyembi (4.46974°S 143.144677°E) of Gawi Rural LLG in East Sepik Province.
