= Chambri language =

Lower Sepik language spoken in Papua New Guinea

Chambri
- Native to: Papua New Guinea
- Region: Chambri Lakes region, East Sepik Province
- Ethnicity: Chambri
- Native speakers: 800 (2006)
- Language family: Ramu–Lower Sepik: Lower Sepik (Nor–Pondo); Pondo?; Chambri

Language codes
- ISO 639-3: can
- Glottolog: cham1313
- ELP: Chambri

The Chambri language is spoken by the Chambri people of the Chambri Lakes region in the Sepik basin of northern Papua New Guinea. Spellings in the older anthropological literature include Tchambuli, Tshamberi. Being completely surrounded by the Sepik languages, it is geographically separated from the rest of the Ramu–Lower Sepik language family, of which Chambri is a member.
