= Owiniga language =

Left May language of Papua New Guinea

Owiniga
- Native to: Papua New Guinea
- Region: Tunap-Hunstein Rural LLG, East Sepik Province
- Native speakers: (330 cited 1998)
- Language family: Arai–Samaia: Left May (Arai); Owiniga

Language codes
- ISO 639-3: owi
- Glottolog: owin1240
- ELP: Owiniga

Owiniga (a.k.a. Bero, Samo, Taina) is a Left May language of Tunap/Hunstein Rural LLG, East Sepik Province in Papua New Guinea.

It is spoken in Amu, Inagri (4.479158°S 141.709444°E), Samo (4.425648°S 141.715772°E), and Yei (4.425035°S 141.832443°E) villages.
