= Watakataui language =

Sepik language of Papua New Guinea

Watakataui
- Waxei
- Native to: Papua New Guinea
- Region: East Sepik Province
- Native speakers: 750 (2020)
- Language family: Sepik: Bahinemo; Watakataui

Language codes
- ISO 639-3: wtk
- Glottolog: wata1251
- ELP: Watakataui

Watakataui is a Sepik language spoken in two villages of East Sepik Province, Papua-New Guinea.
