= Alamblak language =

Language of East Sepik Province, Papua New Guinea

Coordinates: 4.663070°S 143.315760°E

Alamblak
- Native to: Papua New Guinea
- Native speakers: 1,000 (2011)
- Language family: Sepik: Sepik Hill; Alamblak; Alamblak

Language codes
- ISO 639-3: amp
- Glottolog: alam1246
- ELP: Alamblak

The Alamblak language is spoken in the Angoram District of East Sepik Province, Papua New Guinea. One dialect is spoken in nine villages on the Middle Karawari and Wagupmeri rivers, and another in four villages near Kuvanmas Lake. It is the easternmost of the Sepik Hill languages.

== Geographic distribution ==
=== Dialects/Varieties ===
There are two major dialects of Alamblak: Karawari and Kuvenmas. These dialects demonstrate extensive differences in phonology, grammar, and lexicon. Speakers of the Karawari dialect live along the Karawari and Wagupmeri Rivers, and those of the Kuvenmas dialect live along the southern shore of Lake Kuvenmas and eastward. In 1984, it was noted by linguist Les Bruce that there are approximately 800 speakers of Karawari and 400 speakers of Kuvenmas.

Speakers of the Karawari dialect constitute four of six Alamblak social groups: Këmbrofm, Marhëmbom, Yimanifm, and Bnarm. The Këmbrofm people live in the villages of Tanganbit (Meingenda), Amongabi, Morwok, and in some traditional hamlet sites among the hills between the Karawari River and the Black Water River to the west. The Marhëmbom people live in the villages of Maramba and Chimbut. The Yimanifm people live in the villages of Skayum (Sikaium) and Barabijim (Barapidjin) on the Wagupmeri River and Gitfat Creek. The Bnarm people live in the villages of Yanitabak (Yenitabak) and Denyik (Danyig).

Speakers of the Kuvenmas dialect constitute two of the six Alamblak social groups: Bahwidëh and Wolpam. The Bahwidëh and Wolpam people live in the villages of Tarakai, Sevenbuk, Anganamei, and Mariamei.

== Phonology ==
=== Consonants ===
Alamblak Consonant Phonemes
		Labial	Alveolar	Palato- alveolar	Velar
Nasal		m	n	(ɲ)	
Stop	voiceless	p	t	(tʃ)	k
Stop	voiced	b	d	(dʒ)	
Fricative		f	s	(ʃ)	h
Glide		w		j	
Liquid			r ~ l		

Unlike the Tama languages and Sare, Alamblak does not distinguish between /r/ and /l/.

=== Vowels ===
Alamblak Vowel Phonemes
	Front	Central	Back	
	Front	Central	unrounded	rounded
High	i		ɯ	u
Mid	e		ɤ	o
Low		a		

=== Syllable structure ===
There are three basic syllable patterns in Alamblak:

1. C(C) (C)V(C) (C)
2. V(C) (C)
3. CVV(C)

== Typology ==
Alamblak is a polysynthetic language. It is highly agglutinative with some fusional elements. It exhibits several linguistic features that generally indicate polysynthesis in a Papuan-language context. Some of these include polypersonalism (marking of multiple arguments on verbs) and heavy head-marking. Its basic word order is subject–object–verb, and several other morphosyntactic features generally associated with SOV languages are also exhibited in Alamblak. Specifically, subordinate clauses precede independent clauses (e.g., relative clauses precede the head), case relators follow the noun (as enclitics or suffixes), and the interrogative element is not fronted in a clause, but remains in situ. Examples of these typological features can be seen below. Examples are from Bruce (1984).

tɨndht pɨthë-rhwa-an-t
legend tell-FUT-1SG-3S.F
‘I will tell you a story’

me-t hoitwa kuñ-t
woman-3S.F sleeps house-3S.F
‘a house in which a woman sleeps’

wai kuñ-kimb-ko
go house-side-AL
‘Go to the side of the house’

== See also ==
- Yimas-Alamblak Pidgin
- Bruce, Leslie Peter (1979). "A grammar of Alamblak : (Papua New Guinea)".
