= Berinomo language =

Sepik language spoken in Papua New Guinea

Bitara
- Berinomo
- Native to: Papua New Guinea
- Region: East Sepik Province
- Native speakers: (350 cited 2000 census)
- Language family: Sepik: Bahinemo; Bitara

Language codes
- ISO 639-3: bit
- Glottolog: beri1253
- ELP: Berinomo

Bitara, or Berinomo, is a Sepik language spoken in East Sepik Province, Papua-New Guinea.

It is spoken in Bitara (4.439398°S 142.459545°E) and Kagiru (4.470453°S 142.481622°E) villages of Tunap/Hunstein Rural LLG, East Sepik Province.
