= Kapriman language =

Sepik language of Papua-New Guinea

Kapriman
- Native to: Papua New Guinea
- Region: East Sepik Province
- Native speakers: 1,300 (2006)
- Language family: Sepik: Bahinemo; Kapriman
- Dialects: Kapriman; Karambit

Language codes
- ISO 639-3: dju
- Glottolog: kapr1245
- ELP: Kapriman

Kapriman (or Sare) is a Sepik language spoken in East Sepik Province, Papua-New Guinea. Alternative names are Mugumute, Wasare.

== Phonology ==
Consonants
		Labial	Coronal	Dorsal
Nasal		m	n	
Plosive	voiceless	p	t	k
Plosive	voiced	b	d	ɡ
Fricative		f	s	x
Liquid	rhotic		r	
Liquid	lateral		l	
Semivowel		w	j	

Vowels
	Front	Central	Back
Close	i	ɨ	u
Mid	e	ə	o
Open		a	

Alamblak also has the same vowel system.
