= Bo language (New Guinea) =

Left May language of Papua New Guinea

Bo
- Sorimi
- Native to: Papua New Guinea
- Region: Sandaun Province
- Native speakers: (85 cited 1998)
- Language family: Left May?: Bo
- Dialects: Kaboru; Nikiyama; Umuruta

Language codes
- ISO 639-3: bpw
- Glottolog: bopa1235
- ELP: Bo

Bo (Po, Sorimi) is a possible Left May language of New Guinea, in Sandaun and East Sepik Provinces. It is essentially undocumented, and its status as a separate language is unconfirmed. It is spoken in Bo, Kaumifi, Kobaru, and Nigyama Umarita villages in Sandaun Province.
