= Iwam languages =

Family of languages in Papua New Guinea

Iwam
- Geographic distribution: Upper Sepik River basin in western East Sepik Province, Papua New Guinea
- Linguistic classification: Sepik: Upper Sepik; Iwam

Language codes
- Glottolog: iwam1260

The Iwam languages are a small family of two clearly related languages, May River Iwam and Sepik Iwam are generally classified among the Sepik languages of northern Papua New Guinea; Malcolm Ross places them in an Upper Sepik branch of that family.

The Iwam languages are spoken at the extreme western end of East Sepik Province, Papua New Guinea along the bank of the Upper Sepik River, and are situated just to the west of the Left May languages.
