= Mehek Sign Language =

Sign language of the Mehek people of northwestern Papua New Guinea

- Native to: Papua New Guinea
- Region: Upper Lagaip Valley, Enga Province
- Ethnicity: Mehek
- Native speakers: 2 deaf (2016) along with family and friends
- Language family: home sign?

Language codes
- ISO 639-3: None (mis)
- Glottolog: mehe1245

Mehek Sign Language is either home sign or a possible incipient village sign language of the Mehek people of northwestern Papua New Guinea. It is used by at least two deaf people – one in each of two different communities – and their family and friends, but not by the community as a whole. There are reported to be about 100 signers, but statements of numbers this high are not likely to be accurate.

There appear to be many Mehek families with deaf members. Signs are not standardized, and vary significantly between deaf individuals, with many signs being ad hoc. This suggests multiple instances of home sign and perhaps a contact pidgin rather than a coherent language. Other than pointing and holding a flat hand above the ground to indicate various people's heights, Hatfield (2016) found only thirty sign that were consistent between utterances and between signers, and most of these are highly mimetic, some full-body signs, rather than simply iconic hand signs as in developed sign languages. One sign even involves touch the hands with the feet. Signing involves a great deal of pointing and repetition, and the repetition "often takes a variety of forms".

However, the system does include an apparent topic-comment construction, with a "preparatory clause" that sets the stage for what will be described, unlike what is found in spoken Mehek. For example, for 'a man and a woman fought', the signer will indicate the relative heights of the participants before signing 'man' (pat shoulder), 'woman' (pat head or make fists for breasts) and 'fight' (slap one's face).

== See also ==
- Mehek language
- Wanib Sign Language
