= Ayi language =

Language spoken in Papua New Guinea

Ayi
- Native to: Papua New Guinea
- Region: Sandaun Province
- Native speakers: (430 cited 2000 census)
- Language family: Sepik: Tama; Ayi

Language codes
- ISO 639-3: ayq
- Glottolog: ayip1235
- ELP: Ayi

Distinguish Anong language, whose Chinese name has been misread as "Ayi".

Ayi is a language spoken by approximately 400 people in the southeast of Sandaun Province, Papua-New Guinea.
