= Samaia River =

River in Papua New Guinea

Samaia River Simaia River
- Location within Papua New Guinea

Location
- Country: Papua New Guinea
- Region: Sandaun Province

Physical characteristics
- Source
  - location: Papua New Guinea
- Mouth
  - coordinates: 3°57′21″S 141°16′38″E

The Samaia River or Simaia River is a river in Sandaun Province, Papua New Guinea. The river flows through Green River Rural LLG.

Various Papuan languages are spoken in the watershed of the Samaia River, including the Amto–Musan languages (also called the Samaia River languages).

== See also ==
- List of rivers of Papua New Guinea
- Arai–Samaia languages
- Amto–Musan languages
