= Pouye language =

Sepik language of Papua New Guinea

Pouye
- Native to: Papua New Guinea
- Region: Sandaun Province
- Native speakers: 960 (2003)
- Language family: Sepik: Ram; Pouye

Language codes
- ISO 639-3: bye
- Glottolog: pouy1238
- ELP: Pouye

Pouye (Bouye) is a language spoken in Sandaun Province, Papua New Guinea, by a thousand people, and growing. It is spoken in the seven villages of Bulawa (3.665801°S 142.014408°E), Kiliauto, Komtin, Maurom (3.683154°S 141.847269°E), Wokien (3.697824°S 141.957815°E), Wulme, and Yukilau (3.678344°S 141.925477°E), which are mostly located within East Wapei Rural LLG.

A grammar of the Pouye language is published here: https://www.sil.org/resources/archives/62023

== Phonology ==
This description follows Dede & Reuter (2011).

=== Phonemic inventory ===
Pouye has 12 consonants, of which three have constrastive secondary articulations (labialisation or palatalisation).

Pouye consonant inventory
	Bilabial	Alveolar			Palatal	Velar	
	Bilabial	labialised	plain	palatalised	Palatal	labialised	plain
Plosive	/p/	/tʷ/	/t/	/tʲ/		/kʷ/	/k/
Nasal	/m/		/n/				
Trill			/r/				
Approximant			/l/		/j/	/w/	

A fairly large nine-vowel inventory is also seen:

Pouye vowel inventory
	Front	Central	Back
Close	/i/	/ɨ/	/u/
Near-close	/ɪ/		
Close-mid	/e/		/o/
Open-mid	/ɛ/	/ə/	
Open	/a/		

In addition there are seven diphthongs /au̯ əu̯ ou̯ ai̯ əi̯ ei̯ ɪi̯/ which act as discrete vowel units.

The trial orthography is as in the IPA except for /tʷ tʲ kʷ j/ which are tw ty kw y and the vowels /ɨ ɪ ɛ ə/ which are i i e a. This causes ambiguity between /i ɨ ɪ/, /e ɛ/ or /a ə/ although the functional load on these contrasts is low.

=== Phonotactics ===
Pouye allows maximally two consonants in a syllable onset and one consonant in the coda. The nucleus may be a single vowel or diphthong, but although CVVC and CCVC syllables are permitted, CCVVC syllables are unattested. Complex onsets may be maximally a plosive plus a trill or approximant, or the sequence /kt/, for instance in /kin.kti/ "small" (no other two-plosive sequences occur).

Stress is generally placed on the penultimate syllable, although exceptions do occur (/wɨlˈou̯k/ "snake") and if the penult is /wɨ/ or /wo/ the stress is pushed leftwards (/ˈka.wo.wi/ "white").

=== Morphophonology ===
Several morphophonemic alternations occur in Pouye, both within phonological words and across word boundaries.

==== Trill-deletion ====
The nominal object marker -rɨ loses its initial consonant following /r/ or /l/ or a monosyllable ending in /n/:

/jar-rɨ/ → [jarɨ] who-OBJ "whom"

/pol-rɨ/ → [polɨ] Paul-OBJ "Paul"

/wan-rɨ/ → [wanɨ] 1SG-OBJ "me"

Compare /wəlou̯k-rɨ/ → [wəlou̯krɨ] snake-OBJ. Similarly, the locative marker -ru is realised as [u] in fast speech following any plain alveolar consonant (/n l r t/).

/tɨlpan-ru/ → [tɨlpanu] palm.floor-LOC "on the floor"

/tau̯ wai̯l-ru/ → [tau̯ wai̯lu] tree tree.keel-LOC "on the tree keel"

/jɪprar-ru/ → [jɪpraru] chicken-LOC "on the chicken"

/pɨrɨt-ru/ → [pɨrɨtu] ground-LOC "on the ground"

Compare /ləu̯-ru/ → [ləu̯ru] house-LOC "to the house/village".

==== Vowel epenthesis ====
When concatenation of morphemes would produce a sequence of two identical plosives, /ɨ/ is inserted between them epenthetically.

/t-tɪnri-ke-nɨn-a/ → [tɨtInrikenɨn]

R-revenge-PRF-PAS-awhile

"Had had revenge"

Likewise /ɨ/ is inserted to prevent the formation of non-permissible consonant sequences, i.e. sequences of three consonants where the last two do not form a valid onset as described above, or two such consonants word-initially.

/wilau̯k-mta/ → [wilau̯kɨmta] good-INT "great" /n-kɨ/ → [nɨkɨ] IMP-get "get it!"

Compare for instance /nam-ki/ → [namki] 1P-ACP "with us", where the sequence /mk/ appears intervocalically and can be syllabified to two distinct syllables without requiring epenthesis.

==== Consonant coalescence ====
Two identical nasals, trills or laterals (/mm nn rr ll/) degeminate when brought together.

/t-ətɨn-nɨn/ → [tətɨnɨn] R-sew-PAS "has sewn" /t-ɪl-lai̯/ → [tɪlai̯] R-weave-CONT "weaving"

With the imperative prefix n-, epenthesis occurs prior to this rule, meaning that imperatives remain distinct.

/n-nək/ → [nɨnək] IMP-hold "hold!" *[nək]

==== Approximant epenthesis ====
Between two vowels at morpheme boundaries, a non-lateral approximant is inserted. Following /i ɨ ɪ e ɛ/, /j/ is inserted, and following /u o ə a/, /w/ is inserted.

/t-ake-ɨr/ → [takejɨr] R-see-around "look round" /ra-lə-atʲɨ/ → [raləwatʲɨ] REP-down-come "come down again"

In exception to this rule, the hortative prefix pa- inserts /l/ before a vowel.

/pa-i-nɨm/ → [palinɨm] HRT-go-P "let's go" *[pawinɨm]

Note also the exception described below.

==== Vowel deletion ====
The low vowel /a/ is deleted before /e/ or /ɛ/ over morpheme boundaries.

/t-ja-ɛj-ɨr-wɨt/ → [tʲejɨrwɨt]

R-up-COM-with-stand

"Come up and stand with"

==== Labial-velar approximant deletion ====
The suffix -wo "only" is reduced to -o in penultimate position, i.e. when followed by another single monosyllabic suffix. This prevents stress shifting leftwards.

/wan-wo-kʷɨ/ → [waˈnokʷɨ] 1S-only-POS "my/mine only"

Compare /wan-wo/ → [ˈwanwo] 1SG-only "I only" or /kʷ-atu-wo-ke-nɨn/ → [kʷatuwoˈkenɨn] QCK-hang.up-up-PRF-PAS "quickly hung up (sth.) and left", in which cases wo would not be stressed normally anyway.

==== Dissimilation ====
When the prefixes na- (potential) or ya- (negative) precede the realis prefix t-, and this sequence precedes a morpheme beginning with a plosive, the realis prefix becomes r- via dissimilation of manner with the following plosive.

/ya-t-patɨ-tamu/ → [yarpatɨtamu]

NEG-R-twist-break

"Didn‘t break"

==== Vowel harmony ====
With compound words, vowel harmony causes the open vowel /a/ in the first element to raise to /ə/ in the second element.

/mau̯-ləu̯/ → [məu̯ləu̯] bush-house "bush-house"

==== Alveolar plosive epenthesis ====
The alveolar plosive /t/ is inserted at the end of a word when the following word begins with /m/. If the first word already ends in /t/, then additional epenthesis of /ɨ/ occurs.

/pa-ki me/ → [pakit me] FCS-TMP say "then said" /lot mei̯pɨr-ke/ → [lotɨt mei̯pɨrke] Lot laugh-PRF "Lot laughed"

This and the following rule occur over word boundaries, as opposed to the previous rules which are all word-internal processes.

==== Secondary trill deletion ====
The trill /r/ is also deleted in fast speech in the word riyɨ "now" when the previous word ends in /n/.

/ja-t-i-nɨn rijɨ/ → [jatinɨn ͜ ijɨ] NEG-R-go-PAS now "still has not gone"

=== Loan word phonology ===
Pouye has borrowed a number of words from the lingua franca Tok Pisin. In these words the phonemes /b d ɡ v s/ can be retained, e.g. /sevenpela/ "seven" (cf. native /jilɨkalikir/). Morphophonemic rules generally apply to these words, and the trill deletion rule described above extends its environment to following /s/ as well:

/barnabas-rɨ/ → [barnabasɨ] Barnabas-OBJ "Barnabas"

Note the loan phonemes /b/ and /s/.
