= Ak language =

Sepik language of Papua New Guinea

Ak
- Native to: Papua New Guinea
- Region: Sandaun Province
- Native speakers: 10 (2017)
- Language family: Sepik: Yellow River; Ak

Language codes
- ISO 639-3: akq
- Glottolog: akkk1240
- ELP: Ak
- Ak is classified as Severely Endangered by the UNESCO Atlas of the World's Languages in Danger.

Ak is a minor Sepik language spoken in Sandaun Province, Papua New Guinea. It is spoken in Kwieftim village.
