= Left May languages =

Family of languages in New Guinea

Left May
- Arai
- Geographic distribution: Left May River, eastern Sandaun Province and western East Sepik Province, Papua New Guinea
- Linguistic classification: Arai–Samaia or independent language family: Left May

Language codes
- Glottolog: left1242

The Left May or Arai languages are a small language family of half a dozen closely related but not mutually intelligible languages in the centre of New Guinea, in the watershed of the Left May River. There are only about 2,000 speakers in all. Foley (2018) classifies them separately as an independent language family, while Usher (2020) links them with the Amto–Musan languages.

The Left May languages are spoken at the extreme western end of East Sepik Province, Papua New Guinea.

Ama is the best documented Left May language.

== Languages ==
The languages are:

Iteri (Rocky Peak), Nakwi, Ama, Nimo, Owiniga, and (possibly) Bo.

== Classification ==
Foley (2018) provides the following classification.

Left May family

- western branch: Ama; Nimo; Iteri, Bo
- eastern branch: Owiniga

Iteri and Bo are closely related to each other.

Usher (2020) does not recognize a primary western branch, and distinguishes more languages.

Arai River family

- Ama
- Nimo–Nakwi
  - Nakwi
  - Nimo
- Owiniga
- West Arai River
  - Bo
  - Iteri – Rocky Peak
    - Iteri
    - Rocky Peak

== External relationships ==
Malcolm Ross (2005) linked the Left May languages to Laycock's Kwomtari–Baibai languages in a Left May – Kwomtari family, based on similarities in the pronouns of Rocky Peak. However, he had not corrected for Laycock's errors in classification, and it is not clear if the links are with the Kwomtari or Fas languages.

Timothy Usher links the Left May languages to their neighbors, the Amto–Musan languages and the Pyu language in as Arai–Samaia stock. However, Foley (2018) attributes lexical similarities between the Left May and Amto-Musan families to contact, rather than genetic relationship.

Foley (2018) notes that typologically, the Left May languages are highly different from the other language families of the Sepik-Ramu basin, instead resembling the Trans-New Guinea somewhat more closely. For example, Left May and Trans-New Guinea languages typically all have ergative case markers, which most languages of the Sepik-Ramu basin do not have except for a few such as the isolate Taiap. Nevertheless, Left May and Trans-New Guinea speakers have historically been hostile towards each other (unlike their close trade relationships with Amto-Musan speakers), so there has been no recent contact scenarios to speak of. These typological similarities could be due to chance, ancient contact, or perhaps even a deep genetic relationship.

== Vocabulary comparison ==
The following basic vocabulary words are from Conrad & Dye (1975) and various SIL resources, as cited in the Trans-New Guinea database.

The words cited constitute translation equivalents, whether they are cognate (e.g. kʌmi, ʔɛmi, ʔami for “head”) or not (e.g. dɛbo, ʔinʌ̀, fɛřæ for “skin”).

| gloss | Ama | Bo | Iteri (Rocky Peak dialect) | Iteri | Nimo | Owiniga |
|---|---|---|---|---|---|---|
| head | kamu; 'kaːmũ | kʌmi | ʔɛmi | | ʔami; ʔa'm̀i | kɛmɛ; 'kɛmɛh |
| hair | kamusowa; 'kaːmũsuɒ | kʌmsiya | ʔɛmisu | ami | ʔamiso; ʔami'sò | 'kamo; kɛmo |
| ear | i'ɒː; ʔia | kɔ | ʔo | æu | ɔ; ʔɔ | iso; is̯o; i'só |
| eye | mʝɒː; mʌřa | mʌǏo | ᵽogwa | | mɔ; moh | 'mǒro; mořo |
| nose | amu; 'aːmũ | ki | ʔɩmodʋ | imuř | ʔimʌ | tɛmɛři; tə'mʌ́li |
| tooth | iː | ki | ʔe | ɩ | | imɛři; i'mʌli |
| tongue | isauna; i'saːunɔ̃ | lɛsɛ | | lɛtɛ | isaːbe; isaːpe | isɩ; ise |
| leg | 'ɸeʌu | | | | | feřǽ |
| louse | ʔani; ʌ'nĩː | ka | ʔɔ | æ | amiᶗ; ʔamiyo | eni; kemo; tařap̶úmwaino |
| dog | aǏuou; ʌʝɔ'wɔːu | naři | so | soʔ | ʔau; ʔauh | bɛlɩ; bɛři |
| pig | ᵽu; ʍuː | ᵽu | ᵽu | hwusu | ᵽu | kebaře; kebáře |
| bird | o; oː | wɔ | wo | waři | wʌ; 'ẃəli | be; mbɛh; ya |
| egg | oː iː; ʔui | wɔi | ʔabotɩno | woi | i; sáːviya | bene; mɛřɛfi; mɛřɛri; pe'dana |
| blood | 'nãːkɒ; nakʌʔ | kwo | wo | woʔ | iwʌ | ke; takona |
| bone | miː; mĩː | mutuk | moto | ᵽʋmoto | mi | miři; nom |
| skin | au; 'tɔːnɔ̃ | tʌpɔ | dɛbo | nae | abu; ʔi'nʌ̀ | fɛřæ; fɛřai; numə'řài; sepe |
| breast | nanʌ; 'nãːnɔ̃ | nɔ | nʋ | nou | nɔ | 'náinoh; nano |
| tree | ãː; ʔą | ka | ʔa | ąʔ | a; ʔa | a; ʔaː |
| man | nʌ̃'kɒː; nʌka | nʌkʌ | no | nau | nɔː; nɔno 'sámo | nəgaina; 'nɛ́ka; nʌga; nʌgaina |
| woman | mwi; nə̃'nĩː; nʌkʌǏaǏa | kwa | | uwa; ʔwa | nią; nià 'sámo | 'níboh; nini |
| sun | o'ʝɒː | | | | 'húanota | beřa; mbɛ'lah |
| moon | ʌ'mũː | | | | ʔi'ḿʌ | 'fonai; fořai |
| water | i'wɒː; ʔiwa | ʔu | ʔu | u | wi; ʔwi | bi; ʔmi |
| fire | taː; tah | ta | yɛyʋ | | ta | sa; sah |
| stone | tɛmʌkiʔ; tʌmʌ̃'kiː | tʌpʌki | tʌbe | masɩ | tə'pái; tʌpei | sia; si'yà; sya |
| road, path | mʝɒː; mʌǏa | keři; kʌři | ʔæliwi | ʌři | áři; ařiI | maǥamář; meřeb̶i; mɛ'řiƀi |
| name | 'siːʌʝɔ | | | | | |
| eat | napʌna; tə'nɔ̃ː | sanoʔ | wɛno | | pano; 'yʌ́no 'sáno | epepeki; siyunò; tauna |
| one | siasʌ; 'siːʌsɔ | sɔsɔ | sʋso | susæsæ | siʌesʌ; 'síyasə | ya'liƀuh; yəvyaro; yʌřu |
| two | tiwe; 'tiːwei | tisʌ | tiso | lisæʔ | tiː; tiĩ | si'máƀi; simʌbi; siməbi |

== See also ==
- Amto–Musan languages
- Papuan languages
