= Mehek language =

Language

Mehek
- Native to: Papua New Guinea
- Region: Sandaun Province
- Native speakers: (6,300 cited 1994)
- Language family: Sepik: Tama; Mehek

Language codes
- ISO 639-3: nux
- Glottolog: mehe1243
- ELP: Mehek

Mehek is a Tama language spoken by about 6300 people in a somewhat mountainous area along the southern base of the Torricelli Mountains in northwestern Papua New Guinea. Mehek is spoken in six villages of Sandaun Province: Nuku, Yiminum, Mansuku, Yifkindu, Wilwil, and Kafle. Mehek is most closely related to Pahi, with 51% lexical similarity, and spoken approximately 20 kilometers to the southwest. Mehek is a fairly typical Papuan language, being verb-final, having a relatively simple phonology, and agglutinative morphology. There is very little published information about Mehek. The literacy rate in Tok Pisin, spoken by nearly everyone, is 50-75%. Mehek is not written, so there is no literacy in Mehek. Tok Pisin is primarily used in the schools, with 50% children attending. There is also a sign language used by the large number of deaf people in the Mehek community.

== Alternate Names ==
Mehek is also known as Nuku, Me’ek, Driafleisuma, and Indinogosima The speakers themselves refer to the language as Mehek, which is the word meaning “no.” The alternate names derive from the primary village where it is spoken (Nuku), a phonological variant: epenthetic /h/ occurs word-initially before vowels or between identical vowels (Me’ek), and a phrase meaning “our language” (indinumgo suma).

== Phonology ==
The phonology of Mehek is relatively simple. It has a five-vowel system, much like many of the non-Austronesian languages of Papua New Guinea, in addition to two diphthongs. The consonant system is also fairly simple, containing 15 phonemes. Voiced stops are almost always prenasalized, though this effect is much weaker word-initially. The tables below list the consonant and vowel phonemes. In the list of vowels, the phones in parentheses are allophones.

=== Consonants ===
| | Labial | Dental | Palatal | Velar |
|---|---|---|---|---|
| Stops | p b | t d | | k ɡ |
| Fricatives | f | s | | |
| Nasals | m | n | | ŋ |
| Approximants | w | l r | j | |

=== Vowels ===
| | Front | Central | Back |
|---|---|---|---|
| High | i (ɪ, ɨ) | | u (ʊ) |
| Mid | e (ɛ) | | o (ɔ) |
| Low | | a | |
| Diphthongs | ai | | au |

== Morphology ==
Mehek is an agglutinating language with both prefixes and suffixes.

=== Verbs ===
Mehek has medial and final verbs, only the latter of which take any morphological marking. In a given utterance, there can be any number of medial verb forms. They must precede the final verb and have the same subject as the final verb. Whenever a new subject is introduced, a new final verb form must be used (with a possible string of medial verbs preceding it). There are two past and two future tenses. The Recent Past and the Near Future apply to yesterday and tomorrow, respectively. The Distant Past and Distant Future are used for any day before yesterday or after tomorrow, respectively. The formula for a final verb is: stem+tense+person+interrogative. The interrogative marker is optional and consists of a suffix –a on the end of any verb form. The other suffixes are as follows:

| | Singular | Dual | Plural |
|---|---|---|---|
| 1st person | -(yu)n | -dun | -num |
| 2nd person | -n | -fun | -kum |
| 3rd person | -r (masc.) -s (fem.) | -f | -m |

| Tense | Form |
|---|---|
| Distant Past | -m- |
| Recent Past | -wa- |
| Present | -ya- |
| Near Future | -kya- |
| Distant Future | -ka- |

=== Nouns ===
Nominal morphology is fairly straightforward, each noun only taking a single suffix. Nouns can also appear in their base form. Every noun is specified for gender, masculine or feminine, though the respective gender affix is not obligatory. Living things have natural gender, while plants and inanimate objects have morphological gender. There are five possible affixes a singular noun can take. Nouns in the dual or plural can only be marked for number, and these affixes are obligatory where appropriate.

| Singular Inflection | Form |
|---|---|
| Masculine | -r |
| Feminine | -s |
| Diminutive | -t |
| Locative/Instrumental | -k |
| Vocative | -n |

| Non-Singular Inflection | Form |
|---|---|
| Dual | -f |
| Plural | -m |

=== Pronouns ===
Mehek pronouns documented by Mark Donohue (unpublished field notes), as cited in Foley (2018):

| | | singular | dual | plural |
|---|---|---|---|---|
| 1st person | | ene | nenden | nemen |
| 2nd person | | ne | kefen | kemen |
| 3rd person | masc. | re | fe | me |
| 3rd person | fem. | te | fe | me |

Mehek pronouns documented by Laycock and Z’Graggen (1975) have the suffix -ra:

| | | singular | dual | plural |
|---|---|---|---|---|
| 1st person | | on-ta | non-ra | nom-ra |
| 2nd person | | nu-ra | fun-ra | kum-ra |
| 3rd person | masc. | ru-ra | fu-ra | mu-ra |
| 3rd person | fem. | su-ra | fu-ra | mu-ra |

Mehek pronouns occur in singular, dual and plural number and have different subject and object forms. Mehek also has a series of imperative pronouns which are distinct in the 1st and 3rd persons and are used in commands and suggestions (let’s...).

Subject Pronuns
| | | singular | dual | plural |
|---|---|---|---|---|
| 1st person | | on | dun | num |
| 2nd person | | nu | fun | kum |
| 3rd person | masc. | ru | fu | mu |
| 3rd person | fem. | su | fu | mu |

Object Pronouns
| | | singular | dual | plural |
|---|---|---|---|---|
| 1st person | | ene | nende | nemen |
| 2nd person | | ne | kefen | kemen |
| 3rd person | masc. | re | fe | me |
| 3rd person | fem. | te | fe | me |

Imperative Pronouns
| | | singular | dual | plural |
|---|---|---|---|---|
| 1st person | | ana | anda | ama |
| 2nd person | | nu | fun | kum |
| 3rd person | masc. | or | of | om |
| 3rd person | fem. | os | of | om |

=== Possession ===
Possession is indicated by the morpheme -ko-/-go-. This morpheme takes a prefix that agrees with the possessor in person and number and a suffix that agrees with the possessed in number only. (Gender agreement does occur in both, but only for 3rd person singular entities.) The prefixes are virtually identical to the verbal person suffixes, and the suffixes are identical to the noun suffixes.

=== Numerals ===
The counting system is a restricted system, with only three morphemes combining in different ways to count as high as 24. In practice, though, any number above five will be given in Tok Pisin and numbers above ten are difficult for speakers to recall. The morpheme for “five” is related to the word for “fist.” Numbers above five are combinations of lower numbers up to 15, when a new term is introduced which can then be used for combinations up to 24. This term is related to the word for fist, but with the morpheme for “foot” (suwa) replacing the morpheme for “hand” (lesu). As an example of how the morphemes are combined, 14 is rendered as “5,” “5,” “4.”

| 1 | dirambur |
| 2 | lasif |
| 3 | lasifirndin |
| 4 | lasifu lasifu |
| 5 | yokolesumbutu |
| 15 | yokosuwambutu |

== Syntax ==
The following are some brief facts about Mehek syntax and word order:

- Canonical word order is subject–object–verb (SOV), though there is some freedom within this.
- Transitivity is a semantic property of verbs and there are no syntactic restrictions or morphological marking on nouns or verbs that distinguishes a transitive verb from an intransitive one.
- There is no copula.
- Though adjectives are a sub-class of verbs, when modifying nouns they typically follow the noun, as do numerals.
- Demonstratives, on the other hand, typically precede the noun.
- Most clauses contain multiple verbs, with different medial and final forms (see Verbs above).
- Possession with a 1st, 2nd or a pronominal 3rd person possessor will have the possessive word following the noun and no morphological marking on the noun.
- Possession with a nominal 3rd person possessor will have the possessor first, then the possessive word, then the possessed, also with no morphological marking.
- All clauses are marked with an aspect particle, the realis marker “ka” by far the most common. The irrealis marker “wa” is the second most common. This particle typically comes between the subject and object.
- Negated verbs of all person and tense categories take the suffix –nak, which replaces all other suffixes. The negative word “iki” is also required and typically precedes the subject.

== See also ==
- Mehek Sign Language

== Bibliography ==
- Bugenhagen, Robert D. "A Sociolinguistic Survey of Mehek and Siliput." SIL. 79-108.
- Laycock, D.C. "Languages of Lumi Subdistrict (West Sepik District), New Guinea." Oceanic Linguistics 7.1 (1968): 36-66.
- Laycock, D.C. "Three Upper Sepik Phonologies." Oceanic Linguistics 4.1/2 (1965): 113-18.
- SIL. “Language Community Data Base Profiles.” University of California, San Diego (1985)
