= Yellow River languages =

Language family

Yellow River
- Geographic distribution: Yellow River, central Sandaun Province, Papua New Guinea
- Linguistic classification: Sepik: Upper Sepik; Yellow River

Language codes
- Glottolog: yell1247

The Yellow River languages are a small family of clearly related languages,

Namia (Namie), Ak, and Awun.

They are classified among the Sepik languages of northern Papua New Guinea.

Namia is the most divergent Yellow River language.

== Distribution ==
They are spoken along the Yellow River (a tributary of the Sepik) in a mountainous area of central Sandaun Province, located to the north of the Upper Sepik basin. They are located directly to the southwest of the Ram languages, another Sepik group.

== Pronouns ==
The pronouns Ross reconstructs for proto–Yellow River are:

I	*wan	we two	*ɨ-t	we	*ɨ(m, n)
thou	*nɨ	you two	(*kə-, *wə-p)	you	(*kə-m, *wə-m)
he	*[ə]rə	they two	*tə-p	they	*tə-m
she	*ɨ	they two	*tə-p	they	*tə-m
