= Bahinemo language =

Sepik language spoken in Papua New Guinea

Bahinemo
- Native to: Papua New Guinea
- Region: East Sepik Province
- Native speakers: 700 (2012)
- Language family: Sepik: Bahinemo; Bahinemo

Language codes
- ISO 639-3: bjh
- Glottolog: bahi1254
- ELP: Bahinemo
- Coordinates: 4.629412°S 142.747919°E

Bahinemo (Gahom) is a Sepik language spoken in East Sepik Province, Papua-New Guinea.

It is spoken in 4 villages, including in Gahom village (4.629412°S 142.747919°E) of Tunap/Hunstein Rural LLG in East Sepik Province.
