= Chambri people =

Ethnic group in the Chambri Lakes region

Chambri (previously spelled Tchambuli) are an ethnic group in the Chambri Lakes region in the East Sepik province of Papua New Guinea. The social structures of Chambri society have often been a subject in the study of gender roles. They speak the Chambri language.

Margaret Mead, a cultural anthropologist, studied the Chambri in 1933. Her influential book Sex and Temperament in Three Primitive Societies became a major cornerstone of the women's liberation movement, since it claimed that females had significant and dominant roles in Chambri society.

== History ==
This community is located near Chambri Lake in Papua New Guinea, in the middle region of the Sepik River. The Chambri consist of three villages: Indingai, Wombun, and Kilimbit. Together, these communities contain about 1,000 people. When the Chambri first came together, though isolated, they located communities nearby that made it possible for cultural interaction and growth.

A neighboring society, the Iatmul people, and the Chambri began trading goods so that each could progress and aid one another. The Chambri have been, and continue to be a large fishing community. The fish Chambri caught were in turn traded with the Iatmul to receive sago. For shell valuables the Chambri traded their hand-made tools and products. In later years as the introduction of European tools began appearing within the culture, the Iatmul no longer needed the Chambri's tools and goods. This left the Chambri vulnerable and eventually led to the Chambri society leaving their island to protect their community from the rising Iatmul military. They returned in 1927 once peace had been restored in their area. Historically known as headhunters and a volatile group, the Chambri abandoned these tendencies once Papua New Guinea came under independent government. Culturally their society had changed due to European influences, however the personal interactions and customs within the Chambri had not. New neighboring societies were formed, trade and growth continued throughout the years as anthropologists such as Margaret Mead, Deborah Gewertz and Frederick Errington visited this tribal location and reported on their findings.

=== Contemporary ===
Now a non-violent community, the Chambri still maintain their lifestyle through bartering and intertribal trade. The diet of the Chambri continues to consist mainly of sago and fish. As an island community, fishing is a staple of this society. The surplus fish that are not needed for the villages’ nourishment are then taken and traded in the mountains for sago. Trade takes its form in the way of barter markets that occur on a six-day schedule. Barter markets are located in the Sepik Hills and women from the Chambri travel to meet other women from various villages spread throughout the hills to barter their food. Unlike their history with the Iatmul society, the Chambri and the villages they trade with have a more equal status between each.

As anthropologists visited and studied the Chambri culture, their villages and culture were affected. Anthropologists brought some of the Chambri people to the United States to share their culture. When bringing them back to Papua New Guinea they brought back new ideas and customs they had acquired from their travels. As the world modernized, the Chambri villages became less financially stable through their trade and goods. Even through the financial distress, the Chambri culture and people survived and continued to practice their ways.

== Chambri women ==
In Margaret Mead’s field study research in 1933 in Papua New Guinea, she outlined a position of women in the Chambri community that was unusual to what had been thought to be the norm across cultures. She speculated that women in the Chambri were the power individuals within the villages instead of men. How Margaret came to this conclusion was based on a few attributes of the Chambri. She first noted that the Chambri women were the primary suppliers of food. Contrary to other cultures the Chambri women were the ones who did the fishing for the community. This empowerment and responsibility of the women lends to the idea of a higher importance of women within this society. Through further observation Mead found that women also took the fish they caught and not only supplied it as food for their families but traveled to trade the surplus. It was the women's job to take the extra fish caught and travel into the surrounding hills to barter for sago for their families. Once again instead of the primary provider being the man in the family, Mead was witnessing the wife taking this role. However, as later anthropologists Deborah Gewertz and Frederick Errington discovered, these actions do not control the relationships between men and women of the Chambri.

The women being the sole provider for the family does not imply submission by the man. The men in the Chambri society are involved in other areas within the community, many of which are not deemed appropriate for the women. Such areas include politics and power within the tribe. This lack of involvement by women in these areas further suggest Mead's original claim of women's dominance may have been rooted in a lack of full observation of the activities in the Chambri society. Instead what later anthropologists found was that neither sex competed to be the dominant one. Within each sex dominance occurred and was witnessed, however this behavior failed to cross the sex barrier. Specifically neither group was viewed to follow or be submissive to the other. This lack of a dominant individual within a relationship allows for speculation that the role of women in a civilization can drastically be determined by its customs.

== Marriage within the Chambri ==
Marriage within the Chambri is a custom in which neither male nor female has the power. Though a patrilinear culture with arranged marriages, neither party loses full control in the marriage situation. Marriage is conducted in such a way that the men (who most commonly arrange the marriages) choose couplings that allow inter-clan relationships. Marriages that are not arranged also exist, but are much less common. Women have a say in who they marry as they work with male family members to choose a man with decent ancestral power. Bride price does exist within this community and is not looked upon as custom that demeans women. Shell valuables that are acquired through bartering are used for a bride price. Many of these shell valuables have symbolic purposes in the giving. Certain shells are associated specifically with womanly attributes such as childbearing, wombs, and menstruation.

Within marriages women have certain stereotypes with which they have been labeled. Many times within the Chambri men fear their wives. This is because men obtain secret names within the male sorcery facet of the civilization and are forbidden to voice them. Men fear that they will speak while sleeping and reveal their secret names. Furthermore, the easy access women have to many of their husbands' personal aspects such as hair, saliva and semen makes the men wary of what the women could possibly give to a sorcerer. However, in some cases men see this fear as a characteristic of their power. Their view is that if their secret names are worth stealing by their wife, then they must be important and powerful enough for this kind of deceitfulness to have taken place.

== Family ==
Women and men's dependence becomes almost completely equal when examining the roles of brothers and sisters within a traditional Chambri family. Unlike the fear that exists within marriages, fear is non-existent within the Chambri family. Brothers and sisters welcome the other's help in their pursuing of their desired roles within the community. Brothers look to their sisters for help in the political aspect of the Chambri. Sisters obtain help from the brothers in his support for her and her future children. Specifically the brother becomes a significant role in the life of his sister's sons. The brother's nephew in turn is seen to be a key factor in helping the brother in his political uprising. This relationship between nephew and uncle can be seen through the seamless family relationships that exist between the families of mothers and their brothers. The terms brother and sister are not always biologically reflected within the Chambri. Within the clan, women and men can act as siblings to one another during specific times, such as loss. The death of an individual binds the sisters of the clan together by representing the loss of a support system. Contrasting this, the men view a death as a loss of a political position within the community.
