= Hewa people =

Hewa
Total population
- 2,000

Regions with significant populations
- Papua New Guinea: 2,000

The Hewa are an indigenous people that live in the Koroba Lake Kopiago Electorate of Hela Province of Papua New Guinea near the junction of the Strickland River. They were one of the last peoples in Papua New Guinea to come into contact with the outside world. They number about 2,000 persons, and their rugged rainforest terrain comprises about 1,000 square miles (2,590 km^{2}), some of which was unexplored by outside society until 2008. Their language belongs to the Sepik Hills family.

They hunt birds, reptiles and mammals for food, adornment and trade with neighboring tribes. Having learned that fruit- and nectar-eating birds, such as fruit-doves and lorikeets, are vital to forest regeneration, the Hewa slash small gardens out of the dense jungle and allow about 20–25 years for the tilled once-used land to be reforested naturally. Their language is not related to any neighboring culture as their culture is a Sepik Basin one, unlike that of the other Hela Province (formerly Southern Highlands) tribes. They have some limited trade with those neighboring tribes, exchanging the Hewa's animal skins, spears and tree bark fiber for shells and boar tusks. They make paintings on flat sheets of bark but these paintings, done for magical purposes, are never traded or exhibited.

They are one of the few tribes in the fringe highland area never to have practised cannibalism, perhaps because their belief associates cannibalism with dangerous sorcerers. It is not uncommon for women accused of witchcraft to be killed. The Hewa have been extensively studied by anthropologists Lyle Steadman and William H. Thomas. The Hewa were also featured on the final episode of the Discovery Channel program Survivorman and in a later program called Beyond Survival.

The Hewa were one of the last peoples in Papua New Guinea to come into contact with the outside world. Many Hewa people north of the Lagaip River were uncontacted until 1975, when the Officer in Charge at Lake Kopiago braved arrow attacks and led what probably was Papua New Guinea's last "first contact patrol", bringing steel axeheads to an area where stone axeheads were the norm. Even south of the Lagaip, many Hewa families were first contacted by Steadman in the late 1960s. He found that the typical family (which averaged seven people) lived in relative isolation from other families, with their nearest neighbors living from five minutes' walk up to half a mile away through dense jungle. After dark, the families often stay awake for hours, the men telling myths and stories around a fire, and the women, gathered around a separate fire in their section of the house, often interrupting with banter as they create grass skirts or weave stringbags. Sometimes, historical tales are sung or chanted.

In recent decades, change has come to the region. Many Hewa wear Western clothes instead of the traditional grass skirts; though the majority still live in scattered households, some now live in villages and travel agencies fly tourists to newly constructed airstrips to visit them.
