= WTKS =

WTKS may refer to:

- WTKS-FM, a radio station (104.1 FM) licensed to Cocoa Beach, Florida, United States
- WTKS (AM), a radio station (1290 AM) licensed to Savannah, Georgia, United States
- WBBF, a radio station (1120 AM) licensed to Buffalo, New York, which held the call sign WTKS from 1987 to 1988
- WMMJ, a radio station (102.3 FM) licensed to Bethesda, Maryland, which held the call sign WTKS from 1983 to 1987
