= Chenapian language =

Papuan language of Papua New Guinea

Chenapian
- Native to: Papua New Guinea
- Region: East Sepik Province
- Native speakers: 180 (2003)
- Language family: Sepik: Middle Sepik; Wogamusin; Chenapian

Language codes
- ISO 639-3: cjn
- Glottolog: chen1259
- ELP: Chenapian
- Coordinates: 4.273583°S 142.268442°E

Chenapian (Chenap) is a Papuan language of East Sepik Province, Papua New Guinea. It is spoken in Chepanian (Sanapian) village (4.273583°S 142.268442°E), Ambunti Rural LLG.

== Pronouns ==
Chenapian pronouns:

	sg	du	pl
1	an	ser	sam
2m	nan	nay	nam
2f	nin		
3m	tow	tey	tom
3f	ti		
