= Nuku, Papua New Guinea =

Coordinates: 3°40′S 142°29′E

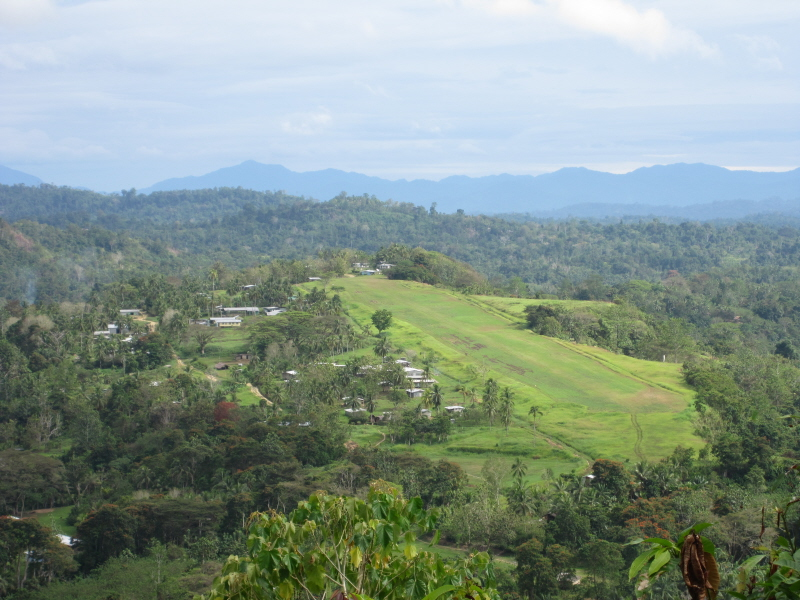
Nuku

Nuku, also known as Nuku Station, is the capital of Nuku District in Sandaun Province, Papua New Guinea. It is located within Mawase Rural LLG.

The language of Nuku is Mehek, though Tok Pisin is also widely spoken.

The district is the tertiary level of political division within Papua New Guinea, after the national and provincial levels. The population is approximately 800, though this is variable with the presence of government employees who may only spend short periods of time in the capital, though they may maintain a residence there. Nuku contains a government outpost, post office, medical center, and airstrip. There are several trade stores, and some Western goods can be purchased, though these are not consistent or reliable for any given item.

The global coordinates for Nuku are 3° 40’ 46.03” S x 142° 28’ 50.51” E, and it lies at an average elevation of 815 feet, though the area is mountainous and the elevation is variable. Nuku is accessible by motor vehicle, though the roads are quite rough and can be impassible during the rainy season. The nearest large town, Mai, is about two hours by motor vehicle or eight hours walking.
