= Chambri Lakes =

Bodies of water in Papua New Guinea

Chambri Lake
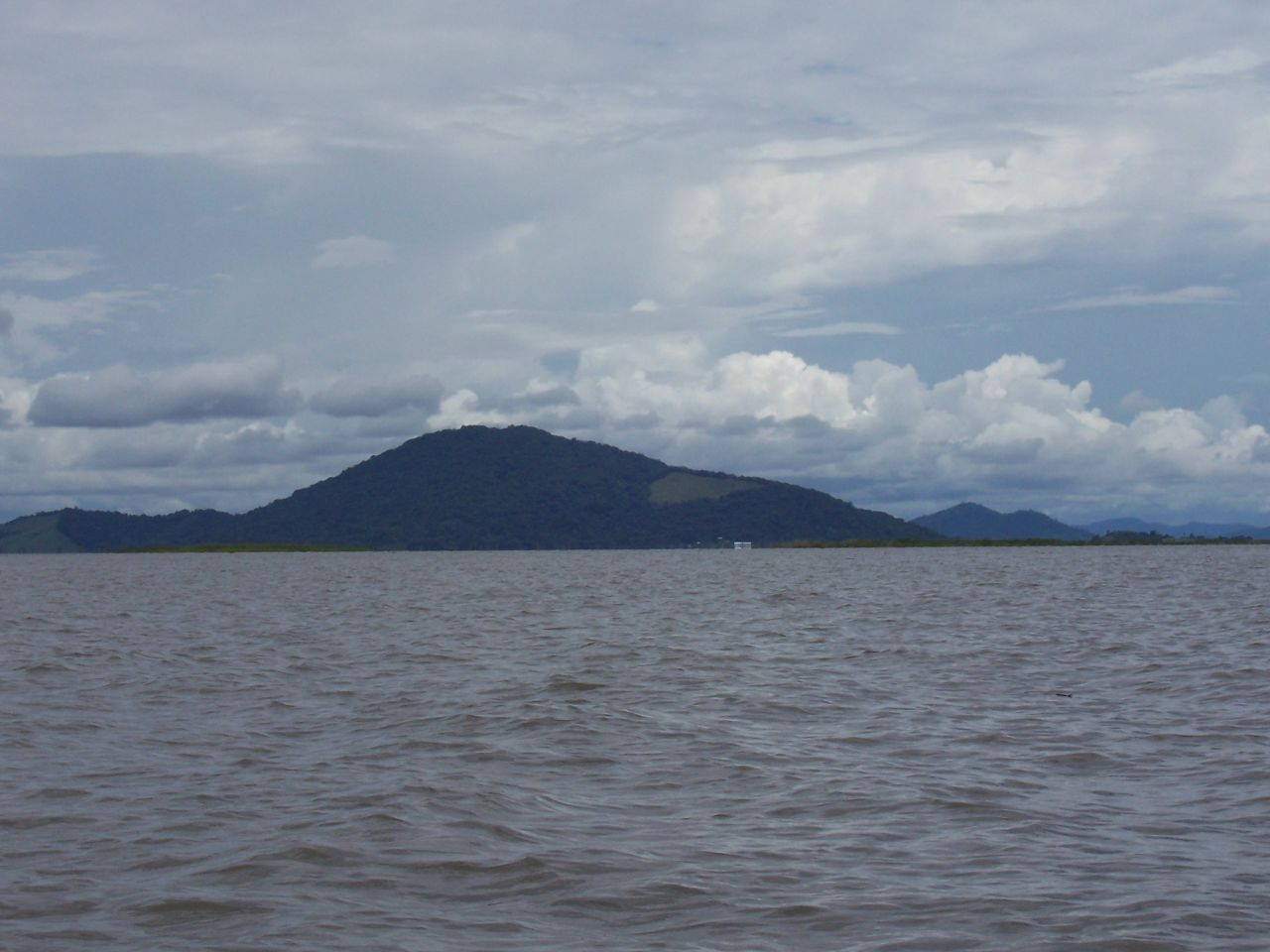
- Chambri Lakes, 2006

- Location within Papua New Guinea
- Coordinates: 4°16′S 143°7′E
- Basin countries: Papua New Guinea

The Chambri Lakes are a series of swamps and shallow water canals in the East Sepik Province of Papua New Guinea that are seasonally filled by the flooding of the Sepik river in vast area of 216 km^{2} (83 sq mi). During the northwest monsoon season, from September to March, occurs overflow of two of the Sepik's tributaries and vast Chambri Lake is created. The Chambri Lakes form in the middle Sepik, between the village of Pagwi and the junction of the crosmari Karawari Rivers with the Sepik. The inhabitants of the Chambri Lakes are renowned for their artistry. The Chambri language is spoken in the Chambri island.
