= Niksek language =

Sepik language of Papua New Guinea

Niksek
- Native to: Papua New Guinea
- Region: East Sepik Province
- Native speakers: 930 (2003)
- Language family: Sepik: Sepik Hill; Southwest; Niksek
- Dialects: Paka; Gabiano

Language codes
- ISO 639-3: gbe
- Glottolog: niks1238
- ELP: Niksek
- Coordinates: 4.696824°S 142.538469°E

Niksek is a Sepik language of northern Papua New Guinea. The two dialects, Paka and Gabiano, are rather divergent. Niksek is spoken in Niksek village (4.696824°S 142.538469°E) of Niksek/Paka ward in Tunap/Hunstein Rural LLG, East Sepik Province.
