= Namea Rural LLG =

Local-level government in Papua New Guinea

- Location within Papua New Guinea
- Coordinates: 3.886863°S 141.791313°E
- Country: Papua New Guinea
- Province: Sandaun Province
- Time zone: UTC+10 (AEST)

Namea Rural LLG is a local-level government (LLG) of Sandaun Province, Papua New Guinea. The Yellow River languages are spoken in this LLG.

== Wards ==
- 01. Abrau
- 02. Alendami
- 03. Akwom
- 04. Augom
- 05. Alai
- 06. Ameni
- 07. Iwani
- 08. Magleri
- 09. Mantopai
- 10. Warukori
- 11. Norambalip
- 12. Yakaltim
- 13. Yegarapi
- 14. Yilui
- 15. Edwaki
