= Left May River =

River in Papua New Guinea

Left May River Arai
- Location within Papua New Guinea

Location
- Country: Papua New Guinea
- Region: East Sepik Province

Physical characteristics
- Source
  - location: Papua New Guinea
- Mouth
  - coordinates: 4°20′10″S 141°39′25″E

The Left May or Arai River is a river in northern Papua New Guinea.

== See also ==
- List of rivers of Papua New Guinea
- Left May languages
