= Telefomin Rural LLG =

Local-level government in Papua New Guinea

- Location within Papua New Guinea
- Coordinates: 5.123652°S 141.640681°E
- Country: Papua New Guinea
- Province: Sandaun Province
- Time zone: UTC+10 (AEST)

Telefomin Rural LLG is a local-level government (LLG) of Sandaun Province, Papua New Guinea. Mountain Ok languages are spoken in the LLG.

== Wards ==
- 01. Amaromin
- 02. Fuiaimin
- 03. Bovripmin
- 04. Sogamin
- 05. Temsapmin
- 06. Abungkamin
- 07. Afogavip
- 08. Agamtauip
- 09. Anavip-Kalikman
- 10. Atemtkiakmin
- 11. Bofulmin/Tifalmin
- 12. Bogalmin
- 13. Drolengam
- 14. Famukin
- 15. Inantigin
- 16. Kialikman/Framen
- 17. Urapmin
- 18. Kobrenmin
- 19. Kobrenmin/Framin
- 20. Komdavip
- 21. Ofektaman
- 22. Okbilavip
- 23. Siliambil
- 24. Fumenavip
- 25. Wabia
- 26. Freda Base

== See also ==
- Telefol language
- Telefol people
