= Nete language =

Engan language spoken in Papua New Guinea

Nete
- Bisorio, Malamauda, Iniai
- Native to: Papua New Guinea
- Region: East Sepik Province
- Native speakers: (1,000 cited 2000–2003)
- Language family: Engan: North Engan; Nete

Language codes
- ISO 639-3: Either: net – Nete bir – Bisorio
- Glottolog: oute1259
- ELP: Bisorio
- Nete is classified as Severely Endangered by the UNESCO Atlas of the World's Languages in Danger.

Nete, also known as Bisorio, Malamauda, or Iniai, is an Engan language spoken in Papua New Guinea.

== Classification ==
Glottolog classifies Nete and Bisorio as two languages within Outer Engan, a divergent group situated northward across the Central Range from the main Engan-speaking area, located in Enga Province. The purported language Bikaru, spoken at the head of the Korosamen River adjacent to the Nete dialect-speaking area, is a dialect of Bisorio fully mutually intelligible with the rest of the language.

== Geography ==
Villages where Nete is spoken include Malaumanda, Anamanda, Lodon, Onge, Kasakali, Takop, Hulipa, Yaipo, Bake, Nai, Onon, Limbia and Menagus.

== Bibliography ==
Word lists of Bisorio

- Conrad, Robert J. and Ronald K. Lewis. 1988 Some language and sociolinguistic relationships in the Upper Sepik region of Papua New Guinea. In: Smith et al. 243–273.
- Davies, John and Bernard Comrie. 1985. A linguistic survey of the Upper Yuat. In: Adams et al., 275–312.
