= Wogamusin language =

Sepik language spoken in Papua New Guinea

Wogamusin
- Region: Ambunti District, East Sepik Province, Papua New Guinea (4 villages)
- Native speakers: (700 cited 1998)
- Language family: Sepik: Middle Sepik; Wogamusin; Wogamusin

Language codes
- ISO 639-3: wog
- Glottolog: woga1249
- ELP: Wogamusin

Wogamusin is a Papuan language found in four villages in the Ambunti District of East Sepik Province, Papua New Guinea. It was spoken by about 700 people in 1998.

== Phonology ==
Vowels
	Front	Central	Back
Close	i		u
Mid	e	ə	o
Open		a	

In non-final positions, /u/ /o/, /i/, and /e/ are [ʊ] [ɔ], [ɪ], and [ɛ], respectively. [ə] appears only in unstressed syllables; when it is followed by /w/ it is rounded: [ɵu̯].

Consonants
		Bilabial	Alveolar	Palatal	Velar	Glottal
Nasal		m	n		ŋ	
Plosive	Voiceless	p	t		k	
Plosive	Voiced	b	d		ɡ	
Plosive	Voiced prenasalized	ᵐb	ⁿd		ᵑɡ	
Fricative			s		h	
Flap			ɺ			
Semivowel				j	w	

Between vowels, /b/ and /ɡ/ lenite to the fricatives [β] and [ɣ], respectively. /s/ is realized as an affricate, [ts], word-initially. /h/ is velar, [x], after /a/ and /o/. Word-finally, voiceless stops are usually unreleased.

=== Phonotactics ===
The consonant /ŋ/ only occurs finally. Bilabial and velar consonants may be followed by /w/ when initial, but otherwise consonant clusters only occur over syllable boundaries, with the exception of the unusual word /məmt/ ('snake').

== Pronouns ==
Wogamusin pronouns:

	sg	du	pl
1	nay	nond	non
2	ni	noh	nom
3m	ye	yoh	yor
3f	yo		
