= Green River Rural LLG =

Local-level government in Papua New Guinea

- Location within Papua New Guinea
- Coordinates: 3.896615°S 141.185699°E
- Country: Papua New Guinea
- Province: Sandaun Province

Population (2011 census)
  - Total: 14,266
- Time zone: UTC+10 (AEST)
- Postal code: PG150414

Green River Rural LLG is a local-level government (LLG) of Sandaun Province, Papua New Guinea. It is located along the border with Keerom Regency, Papua Province and Pegunungan Bintang Regency, Highland Papua Province, in Indonesia.

== Rivers ==
Rivers that flow through the LLG include the Samaia River.

== Languages ==
Green River is one of the most linguistically diverse LLGs of Sandaun Province. Amto-Musan, Busa, Yalë, Kwomtari, Pauwasi, and other languages unrelated to each other are spoken in this LLG.

== Wards ==
- 01. Abaru
- 02. Dieru
- 03. Hogru
- 04. Rawei
- 05. Nagatiman
- 06. Dila
- 07. Marakwini
- 08. Wagu
- 09. Beimap
- 10. Seiawi
- 11. Amto
- 12. Bisiabru
- 13. Idam 1
- 14. Idam 2
- 15. Hufi
- 16. Biake 1
- 17. Kaiseiru
- 18. Sokmaiyon
- 19. Kobraru
- 20. Yabru
- 21. Buna
- 22. Mahanei
- 23. Mukuasi
- 24. Bifro
- 25. Baio
- 26. Yibru
- 27. Miniabru
- 28. Auiya 1
- 29. Kambriap
- 30. Fonginum
- 31. Iuri 1
- 32. Tingirapu
- 33. Amini
- 34. Samunai
- 35. Miarfai
- 36. Biaka
