= East Wapei Rural LLG =

Local-level government in Papua New Guinea

- Location within Papua New Guinea
- Coordinates: 3.488693°S 142.051951°E
- Country: Papua New Guinea
- Province: Sandaun Province
- City: Lumi
- Time zone: UTC+10 (AEST)

East Wapei Rural LLG is a local-level government (LLG) of Sandaun Province, Papua New Guinea. Ram (Sepik) and Wapei (Torricelli) languages are spoken in this LLG.

== Wards ==
- 01. Kamnom
- 02. Bulwo
- 03. Yiklau
- 04. Maurom
- 05. Kulnom
- 06. Kweftim
- 07. Eritei 2
- 08. Taute
- 09. Maui/Talbibi
- 10. Lumi
- 11. Oute
- 12. Tabale
- 13. Karate
- 14. Sainde
- 15. Mabul
