= Ama language (New Guinea) =

Left May language of Papua New Guinea

Ama
- Sawiyanu
- Native to: Papua New Guinea
- Region: East Sepik Province
- Native speakers: (490 cited 2000)
- Language family: Arai–Samaia: Left May (Arai); Ama

Language codes
- ISO 639-3: amm
- Glottolog: amap1240
- ELP: Ama

Ama (Sawiyanu) is a Left May language of Papua New Guinea, in East Sepik Province. Former dialects have merged.

Ethnologue reports that it is spoken in Ama (Wopolu I) (4.103263°S 141.665012°E), Kauvia (Kawiya) (4.123436°S 141.662939°E), Waniap creek (4.215844°S 141.728851°E), Wopolu II (Nokonufa) (4.072957°S 141.706211°E), and Yonuwai (4.193624°S 141.603848°E) villages of Tunap/Hunstein Rural LLG, East Sepik Province.

== Phonology ==
Ama has 12 consonants, which are:

p	t		k	kʷ	
ɸ	s				h
m	n				
w	ɻ	j			

Ama has 7 vowels, which are:

i	u
e	o
	ɔ
a	ɒ

== Pronouns ==
Pronouns are:

	sg	du	pl
1incl		moti	moi
1excl	yo/ya	koti	koi
2	nono/na	moti	moi
3	to/ta	toti	toi

== Grammar ==
Ama has four tenses, which are marked by suffixes.

- remote past (-ki)
- near past (i. e. yesterday) (-a)
- present (today) (Ø, unmarked)
- future (-imoi ~ -i)
