= Periodic tense =

Grammatical category of tense

Periodic tense is a subtype of the grammatical category of tense, which encodes that the event expressed by the verb occurs within a particular period of the day (such as 'at night', 'in the morning' etc.) or of the year ('in winter', 'in summer' etc.). Its does not encode a relation to a particular point of reference, unlike deictic tense, the grammatical expression of time reference (usually past, present or future) relative either to the moment of speaking (absolute tense) or to another point of reference (relative tense).

Periodic tense is geographically restricted to Northern America, the Western Amazon region, the area of the Sepik River in Papua New Guinea, Arnhem Land in Australia and is almost entirely absent from languages of Africa and Eurasia, with the exception of Chukotkan languages.

== Periodic tense in Nez Perce ==
Periodic tense can be illustrated with data from Nez Perce, which has one of the richest paradigms, comprising matutinal, diurnal, vesperal, nocturnal and hivernal, as illustrated in the following examples

méy-tip-se
MAT-eat.meal-PRS:SG
'I am having breakfast.'

halx̣pa-típ-sa
DIU-eat.meal-PRS:SG
'I am eating lunch.'

kulewí·-tip-se
VESP-eat.meal-PRS:SG
'I am eating supper.'

te·w-c͗íq-ce
NOCT-talk-PRS:SG
'I am talking at night.

ʔelíw-tin̉k-ce
HIB-die-PRS:SG
'I am starving in winter.'

== Reconstructibility ==
Periodic tense systems are at least partially reconstructible in some language families. In proto-Sahaptian for instance, nocturnal *têw- and matutinal *mêy-, from which Nez Perce nocturnal te·w- and matutinal méy- above originate, have been reconstructed by Aoki (1962).

In Tacanan languages, four periodic tense markers are reconstructible, whose reflexes in Cavineña or the following: diurnal -chinepe, nocturnal -sisa, auroral -wekaka and vesperal -apuna (Guillaume 2008:126).

== Attested subtypes ==
17 subtypes of periodic tense markers have been identified in Jacques (2023:7, Table 2), with a latinate terminology for each specific time period.

Terminology for periodic tense markers across the world's languages
Period	Term	Example	Reference
at dawn	auroral	Cavineña -wekaka	Guillaume (2008:126)
in the morning	matutinal	Nez Perce mey-	Aoki (1994)
at noon	meridial	Berik	Westrum (1988:154)
in the afternoon	postmeridial	May River Iwam -tep	Foley (2018:286)
in the evening	vesperal	Nez Perce kulewi-	Aoki (1994)
in the night	nocturnal	Nez Perce te·w-	Aoki (1994)
during the day	diurnal	May River Iwam -harok	Foley (2018:286)
all day	panemerial	Chácobo =baina	Tallman (2018:876–878)
all night	pannuchial	Jarawara =haba	Dixon (2004:136)
until dawn	adauroral	Awtuw =alw	Feldman (1986:119)
until noon	admeridial	Omaha -míthumoⁿshi	Marsault (2021:309)
until afternoon		Alamblak -krif	Bruce (1979:275)
until nightfall	adnocturnal	Omaha -hoⁿ	Marsault (2021:309)
during winter	hibernal	Arapaho cecin-	Cowell and Moss (2006:217-218)
during the spring	vernal	Arapaho benii'ow-	Cowell and Moss (2006:217-218)
during the summer	estival	Arapaho biicen-	Cowell and Moss (2006:217-218)
during the fall	autumnal	Arapaho toyoun-	Cowell and Moss (2006:217-218)
