= Kalou language =

Papuan language of Papua-New Guinea

Kalou
- Yawa
- Native to: Papua New Guinea
- Native speakers: 1,400 (2003)
- Language family: Sepik: Upper Sepik; Amal–Kalou; Kalou

Language codes
- ISO 639-3: ywa
- Glottolog: kalo1262
- ELP: Kalou

Kalou, or Yawa, is a Papuan language of Papua-New Guinea. It is closely related to Amal.
