= Arai–Samaia languages =

Proposed language family of New Guinea

Arai–Samaia
- Arai and Samaia Rivers
- Geographic distribution: New Guinea
- Subdivisions: Arai; Pyu; Samaia

Language codes
- Glottolog: None

Arai–Samaia is a language family of New Guinea, proposed by Timothy Usher, that includes the Arai (Left May) and Samaia (Amto–Musan) languages and the Pyu isolate.

- Arai and Samaia Rivers
  - Arai River
    - Ama
    - Nimo–Nakwi
    - Owiniga
    - West Arai River
  - Pyu
  - Samaia River
    - Amto
    - Musan
