= Sepik languages =

Papuan language family

Sepik
- Sepik River
- Geographic distribution: Sepik River region, northern Papua New Guinea (mostly in East Sepik Province)
- Linguistic classification: One of the world's primary language families
- Subdivisions: Leonhard Schultze; Sepik Hills; Middle Sepik; Upper Sepik

Language codes
- Glottolog: sepi1257
- Distribution of Sepik languages in Papua New Guinea

The Sepik or Sepik River languages are a family of some 50 Papuan languages spoken in the Sepik river basin of northern Papua New Guinea, proposed by Donald Laycock in 1965 in a somewhat more limited form than presented here. They tend to have simple phonologies, with few consonants or vowels and usually no tones.

The best-studied Sepik language is Iatmul. The most populous are Iatmul's fellow Ndu languages Abelam and Boiken, with about 35,000 speakers each.

The Sepik languages, like their Ramu neighbors, appear to have three-vowel systems, /ɨ ə a/, that distinguish only vowel height in a vertical vowel system. Phonetic [i e o u] are a result of palatal and labial assimilation to adjacent consonants. It is suspected that the Ndu languages may reduce this to a two-vowel system, with /ɨ/ epenthetic (Foley 1986).

== Classification ==
The Sepik languages consist of two branches of Kandru's Laycock's Sepik–Ramu proposal, the Sepik subphylum and Leonhard Schultze stock. According to Malcolm Ross, the most promising external relationship is not with Ramu, pace Laycock, but with the Torricelli family.

Palmer (2018) classifies the Leonhard Schultze languages as an independent language phylum.

=== Usher (2020) ===
In the cladogram below, the small, closely related families in bold at the ends of the branches are covered in separate articles.

- Sepik
  - Leonhard Schultze
    - **Walio** family
    - Papi family (Papi, Suarmin/Asaba)
  - Upper Sepik
    - - Abau
      - **Iwam** family
    - Yellow–Wanibe Rivers
      - **Ram** family
      - **Yellow River** family
      - Amal–Kalou
  - Middle Sepik
    - - **Tama** family
      - **Nukuma** family
    - - Yerakai
      - **Ndu** family
  - Sepik Hills
    - Sanio
    - Hewa–Paka: Niksek (Paka, Gabiano), Piame, Hewa
    - **Bahinemo** family
    - **Alamblak** family

The Sepik languages as classified by William A. Foley

=== Foley (2018) ===
Foley (2018) provides the following classification, with 6 main branches recognized.

- **Sepik family**
  - **Middle Sepik languages**
    - **Ndu languages**
    - **Nukuma languages**
    - Yerakai (Garamambu)
    - **Yellow River languages**
  - **Tama languages**
  - **Sepik Hill languages**
    - **Eastern** (Alamblak)
    - **Central** (Bahinemo)
    - Western: Saniyo-Hiyewe, Paka (Setiali), Gabiano (Niksek), Piame, Bikaru, Umairof, Hewa
  - **Ram languages**
  - **Upper Sepik languages**
    - **Wogamus languages**
    - **Iwam languages**
    - Abau
  - Amal

Like the neighboring Torricelli languages, but unlike the rest of the Sepik languages, the Ram and Yellow River languages do not have clause chaining constructions (for an example of a clause chaining construction in a Trans-New Guinea language, see Kamano language#Clause chaining). Foley (2018) suggests that many of the Ram and Yellow River-speaking peoples may have in fact been Torricelli speakers who were later assimilated by Sepik-speaking peoples.

Foley classifies the Leonhard Schultze languages separately as an independent language family.

== Pronouns ==
The pronouns Ross reconstructs for proto-Sepik are:

I	*wan	we two	*na-nd, *na-p	we	*na-m
thou (M)	*mɨ-n	you two	*kwə-p	you	*kwə-m
thou (F)	*yɨ-n, *nyɨ-n	you two	*kwə-p	you	*kwə-m
he	*ətə-d, *də	they two	*ətə-p, *tɨ-p	they	*ətə-m, *tɨ-m
she	*ətə-t, *tɨ	they two	*ətə-p, *tɨ-p	they	*ətə-m, *tɨ-m

Note the similarities of the dual and plural suffixes with those of the Torricelli languages.

Ross reconstructs two sets of pronouns for "proto–Upper Sepik" (actually, Abau–Iwam and Wogamusin (Tama)). These are the default set (Set I), and a set with "certain interpersonal and pragmatic functions" (table 1.27):

Pronoun Set I
I	*an	we two	*nə-d	we	*nə-n
thou (M)	*nɨ	you two	*nə-p	you	*nə-m
thou (F)	(*nɨ-n)	you two	*nə-p	you	*nə-m
he	*tə-	they two	(*rə-p)	they	*ra-m
she	*tɨ-	they two	(*rə-p)	they	*ra-m

Pronoun Set II
I	*ka	we two	*krə-d	we	*krə-m
thou (M)	*kɨ	you two	*kə-p	you	*kə-m
thou (F)	?	you two	*kə-p	you	*kə-m
he	*si	they two	*sə-p	they	(*sə-m)
she	(*sae)	they two	*sə-p	they	(*sə-m)

Most Sepik languages have reflexes of proto-Sepik *na ~ *an for 1sg, *no for 1pl, and *ni for 2sg.

== Cognates ==
Proto-Sepik forms reconstructed by Foley (2018) that are widespread across the family:

gloss	proto-Sepik
'breast'	*muk
'tongue'	*ta(w)r
'tree'	*mi
'dog'	*wara
'louse'	*nim
'feces'	*ri
'go'	*(y)i
'come'	*ya
'1sg'	*na ~ *an
'2sg'	*ni
'1pl'	*no
'dative suffix'	*-ni
'locative suffix'	*-kV

== Typological overview ==
Even internally within Sepik subgroups, languages in the Sepik family can have vastly different typological profiles varying from isolating to agglutinative, with example languages listed below.

group	isolating	agglutinative
Ndu	Ambulas	Manambu
Sepik Hill	Sanio-Hiowe	Alamblak
Tama	Yessan-Mayo	Mehek

In contrast, languages within the Ramu, Lower Sepik, and Yuat families all have relatively uniform typological profiles.

=== Gender ===
Like the isolate Taiap, but unlike the Lower Sepik-Ramu, Yuat, and Upper Yuat families, Sepik languages distinguish masculine and feminine genders, with the feminine gender being the more common default unmarked gender. Proto-Sepik gender-marking suffixes are reconstructed by Foley (2018) as:

	singular	dual	plural
masculine	*-r	*-f	*-m
feminine	*-t ~ *-s	*-f	*-m

In Sepik languages, gender-marking suffixes are not always attached to the head noun, and can also be affixed to other roots in the phrase.

Typically, the genders of lower animals and inanimate objects are determined according to shape and size: big or long objects are typically classified as masculine (as a result of phallic imagery), while small or short objects are typically classified as feminine. In some languages, objects can be classified as either masculine or feminine, depending on the physical characteristics intended for emphasis. To illustrate, below is an example in Abau, an Upper Sepik language:

- youk se 'paddle M.DAT' focuses on the length of the paddle
- youk ke 'paddle F.DAT' focuses on the flat nature of the two-dimensional paddle blade

Except for the Middle Sepik languages, most Sepik languages overtly mark nouns using gender suffixes.

=== Periodic tense ===
Many Sepik languages from different branches, including Awtuw, May River Iwam, Abau or Alamblak, encode periodic tense in their verbal morphology, though the markers themselves are not cognate.

== See also ==
- Papuan languages
- Sepik–Ramu languages
- Donald Laycock
- William A. Foley
