= Sepik–Ramu languages =

Obsolete language family of New Guinea

Sepik–Ramu
- (obsolete)
- Geographic distribution: New Guinea
- Linguistic classification: Proposed language family
- Subdivisions: Sepik; Ramu; Nor–Pondo; Leonhard Schultze (Walio–Papi); Tayap

Language codes
- Glottolog: None

The Sepik–Ramu languages are an obsolete language family of New Guinea linking the Sepik, Ramu, Nor–Pondo (Lower Sepik), Leonhard Schultze (Walio–Papi) and Yuat families, together with the Taiap language isolate, and proposed by Donald Laycock and John Z'graggen in 1975.

Sepik–Ramu would consist of a hundred languages of the Sepik and Ramu river basins of northern Papua New Guinea, but spoken by only 200,000 people in all. The languages tend to have simple phonologies, with few consonants or vowels and usually no tones.

The best known Sepik–Ramu language is Iatmül. The most populous are Iatmül's fellow Ndu languages Abelam and Boiken, with about 35,000 speakers apiece.

Malcolm Ross and William A. Foley separately re-evaluated the Sepik–Ramu hypothesis in 2005. They both found no evidence that it forms a valid family. However, all of the constituent branches, except for Yuat within Ramu, remain individually valid in his evaluation. Ross links Nor–Pondo to Ramu in a Ramu–Lower Sepik proposal, places Leonhard Schultze (tentatively broken up into Walio and Papi) within an extended Sepik family, and treats Yuat and Taiap as independent families.

== Classification ==
=== Ethnologue ===
This list is a mirror of the classification in Ethnologue 15.

- Sepik–Ramu phylum (based on Laycock 1973)
  - Taiap isolate
  - Leonhard Schultze stock
    - Walio family (4 languages)
    - Papi family (2 languages)
  - Nor–Pondo stock (6 languages)
  - Ramu subphylum (37 languages)
    - Ramu superstock (29 languages)
      - Grass stock (5 languages)
      - Arafundi family (2 languages)
      - Annaberg stock (3 languages)
      - Ruboni stock (8 languages)
        - Ottilien family
        - Misegian family
      - Goam stock (11 languages)
        - Ataitan family
        - Tamolan family
    - Yuat–Langam superstock (13 languages)
      - Mongol–Langam family
      - Yuat–Maramba stock
        - Maramba isolate (unattested)
        - Yuat family
  - Sepik subphylum (50 languages) [see subclassification at that article]

=== Foley (2018) ===
Uncontroversially coherent subgroups accepted by Foley (2018) are:

- Sepik (11 groups)
  - Ndu (Middle Sepik?)
  - Nukuma (Middle Sepik?)
  - Yerakai (Middle Sepik?)
  - Yellow River (Middle Sepik?)
  - Tama
  - Sepik Hill
  - Ram
  - Wogamus (Upper Sepik?)
  - Iwam (Upper Sepik?)
  - Abau (Upper Sepik?)
  - Amal
- Ramu (5 groups)
  - Middle Ramu
  - Tamolan
  - Ataitan (Tanggu)
  - Ottilien–Misegian
  - Grass
- Lower Sepik
- Leonhard Schultze (Walio-Papi)
  - Walio
  - Papi
- Yuat
- Taiap

== Lexical comparison ==
Below is a comparison of proto-Ndu, proto-Lower Sepik, and proto-Ottilien reconstructed by and listed in Foley (2005).

gloss	proto-Ndu	proto-Lower Sepik	proto-Ottilien
man, person	*ntɨw	*nor	*namot
water	*ŋkɨw	*arɨm	
fire	*ya	*awr	*s(u)ək
sun	*ɲa		*ra(u)
moon	*mpapmɨw	*m(w)il ?	*kər(v)i
breast	*mɨwɲ	*nɨŋgay	*mɨr
tooth	*nɨmpɨy	*sisiŋk ?	*nda(r)
bone	*apə	*sariŋamp	*ɣar
tongue	*tɨkŋa	*minɨŋ	*mi(m)
eye	*mɨyR	*tambri	*rəmeak
nose	*tam(w)ə		*ŋgum
leg	*man	*namuŋk	*or ?
ear	*wan	*kwand-	
name	*cɨ		*ɣi
pig	*mp(w)al	*numpran	*rəkəm
snake	*kampwəy	*wakɨn	*ndop
mosquito	*kɨvɨy	*naŋgun	*ŋgit
eat	*kɨ	*am(b)	*amb
go	*yɨ	*wa	*saŋg
come	*ya	*ya	*kɨp
sit	*rə	*sa	*mbirak
stand	*rap(m)		*-tik
one	*nək	*mb(w)ia-	*kaku
two		*ri-pa-	*mbuniŋ
three		*-ram	

Due to its highly divergent lexicon, Foley does not classify Sepik with Lower Sepik and Ramu.

== See also ==
- Papuan languages
- Northwest Papuan languages
