= Burui language =

Ndu language of Papua New Guinea

Burui
- Native to: Papua New Guinea
- Region: East Sepik Province
- Native speakers: (260 cited 2000)
- Language family: Sepik: Middle Sepik; Ndu; Burui

Language codes
- ISO 639-3: bry
- Glottolog: buru1309
- ELP: Burui
- Coordinates: 3.989893°S 143.035181°E

Burui is one of the Ndu languages of Sepik River region of northern Papua New Guinea. It is spoken in Burui village (3.989893°S 143.035181°E) of Burui/Kunai Rural LLG, East Sepik Province.
