= GBF =

GBF may refer to:

- Bilfinger, a German firm, stock symbol
- G.B.F. (film), 2013, US
- Gaikundi language, native to Papua New Guinea
- Gain before feedback
- Gay best friend
- Georgian Basketball Federation
- Graduate Business Forum, US
- Granblue Fantasy, a popular Japanese video game
- Grassroots Business Fund, US
- Gundam Build Fighters, Japanese anime series
