= Yelogu language =

Ndu language spoken in Papua New Guinea

Yelogu
- Kaunga
- Native to: Papua New Guinea
- Region: East Sepik Province
- Native speakers: 900 (2018)
- Language family: Sepik: Middle Sepik; Ndu; Yelogu

Language codes
- ISO 639-3: ylg
- Glottolog: yelo1243
- ELP: Yelogu
- Coordinates: 4.139504°S 142.803587°E

Yelogu, also known as Kaunga, is one of the Ndu languages of Sepik River region of northern Papua New Guinea. It is spoken in Yelogu village (4.139504°S 142.803587°E), Bangus ward, Ambunti Rural LLG, East Sepik Province.
