= Koiwat language =

Ndu language of Papua New Guinea

Koiwat
- Native to: Papua New Guinea
- Region: East Sepik Province
- Native speakers: (800 cited 2000 census)
- Language family: Sepik: Middle Sepik; Ndu; Koiwat

Language codes
- ISO 639-3: kxt
- Glottolog: koiw1243
- ELP: Koiwat

Koiwat is one of the Ndu languages of Sepik River region of northern Papua New Guinea.

It is spoken in Kamangaui (4.116371°S 143.593484°E), Koiwat (4.089795°S 143.555238°E), Paiambit (4.11068°S 143.69616°E), and Seraba (4.063985°S 143.629118°E) villages of Koiwat ward, Angoram/Middle Sepik Rural LLG, East Sepik Province.
