= Kwoma language =

Sepik language of Papua New Guinea

Kwoma
- Native to: Papua New Guinea
- Region: East Sepik
- Ethnicity: Kwoma
- Native speakers: 4,000 (2018)
- Language family: Sepik: Middle Sepik; Nukuma; Kwoma

Language codes
- ISO 639-3: kmo
- Glottolog: kwom1262
- ELP: Kwoma

Kwoma is a Sepik language of Papua New Guinea also known as Washkuk. The word 'Kwoma' means "hill people" (from Kwow, meaning hill, + ma, meaning people or man). Washkuk is a government name for the people of Kwoma. Linguists have the given the name 'Kwoma' as the primary name of the language, but 'Nukuma' is the specific name for the Northern dialect. Nukuma (Nu-top, Kuma-people) means people who live along the upper reaches of the Sanchi River. The speakers of Kwoma are located in the Ambunti district of the Sepik River region. There are two dialects known as Kwoma (Washkuk) and Nukuma. The Kwoma dialect or "hill people" is located in the Washkuk Hills which is a range of mountains on the north side of the Sepik. The Nukuma dialect or "headwater people" live to the north and west of the Washkuk range along the Sepik River. Kwoma is considered an endangered language with an estimated 2,925 native speakers worldwide.

== Demographics ==
The Kwoma people reside in the Washkuk Hills Census District, an area of 301 miles. The number of Kwoma speakers in the Washkuk Hills is approximately 2,000. Whereas, the number of Nukuma speakers is approximately 1,200 people. As of 2011, Washkuk (Waskuk) ward (4.233099°S 142.407645°E) is located in Ambunti Rural LLG, East Sepik Province.

There are four Kwoma tribes consisting of various clans in the following villages of Ambunti Rural LLG:

- Hogwama tribe in the villages of Washkuk (4.187114°S 142.757332°E), Bangwis (4.182776°S 142.783513°E), and Melawei (4.215109°S 142.752237°E)
- Kowariyasi tribe in the villages of Meno (4.167451°S 142.68621°E) and Beglam (4.193369°S 142.693064°E)
- Wurubaj tribe in Urumbaj (4.132689°S 142.707665°E)
- Tokogwiyishebi tribe in Tongwinjamb (4.126457°S 142.705615°E)

Linguistically speaking, Kwoma is closely related to the Kwanga language spoken by a larger population in the Torricelli Mountains. It is speculated the Kwoma people migrated from this area to their present region. In their regular lives, the people speak Kwoma to each other and New Guinea pidgin with outsiders. Very few people speak English. The Kwoma and Nukuma refer to their neighbors on the Sepik as 'Kwayama', which literally means "grass skirt people". This name was derived because the women in the river villages traditionally wore grass skirts unlike Kwoma women and men, who went around completely naked. Kwoma is also spoken as a second language by many neighboring groups for instance, the Kwoma dialect is spoken by many members of the three Manambu speaking villages on the Sepik, and by many members of the villages Yesan, Maio, and Nayiwori, Yelogu village. Kwoma is spoken as a second language in these neighboring villages because of the close social ties that have existed for many generations because these different villages traded goods with one another.

== Linguistic Affiliation ==
Kwoma is part of 90 distinct Papuan non-Austronesian languages composing the Nukuma Language Family. The Kwoma have a rich extensive tradition of singing songs written previously from different clans and tribes. They perform these songs in every day context, such as when they are roofing a new house as well as during magic rituals. The songs are composed in a mixture of everyday speech as well as historical vocabulary, which many younger Kwoma do not understand nor use as Kwoma words. The two dialects of Kwoma are different in only minor ways and speakers of both dialects readily understand each of the dialects. Some common words in Kwoma include wayaga yichar eem, meaning ancestral place. Mashi nobo means ancestral practice. Wayaga tar agama means ancestral village. Yimowurek eek tar wayaga means ancestry. For the subject of ceremony, mayira means ceremonial object. Sukwiya sayawa nedii means ceremonial occasion. There are many different sayings of 'hand' including tapa, tapa jumu. Ha paya means hand across. There are many different words for 'homicide' including apo eyi, apokwashi ya, aposhebu sapi, botiika, diigii, hapa pika, hapa pika ya, pay, pika, tay, and poyi.

== Phonology ==
=== Consonants ===
The consonant inventory of Kwoma is average in many respects, without uncommon consonants and with no absence of common consonants. There are no glottalized, lateral, or uvular consonants in Kwoma. Stress occurs on the first syllable of words. Below is a chart of Kwoma consonants.

Table of consonant phonemes of Kwoma
	Labial	Rounded Labial	Dental/ Alveolar	Palatal	Velar	Rounded Velar	Glottal
Nasal	m	mʷ	n	ɲ			
Plosive	p ᵐb	bʷ	t ⁿd	tɕ ᶮdʝ	k ᵑɡ	kʷ ᵑɡʷ	ʔ
Fricative	β		s	ɕ			h
Resonant			r	j		w	

=== Vowels ===
There are at least seven vowel qualities in Kwoma: /i ɨ u e o ε ɑ/. The additional vowel /ɔ/ is listed in linguistic writings but no examples are provided. There is no distinction of vowel length.

Phonological conventions of Kwoma:

- /i/ is pronounced high rounded [y] preceding /w/ in word medial positions.
- /p/ can be pronounced either [p] in all positions.
- /b/ is pronounced usually [b], but can also be pronounced [b] in word initial position. /t/ and /k/ can be voiced [d] intervocalically.
- /j/ can be pronounced also [l] by certain speakers.

== Morphology ==
Kwoma is an analytic language containing a number of suffixes.

== Word Order ==
Kwoma's word order is subject-object-verb (SOV). The order of subject and verb is subject then verb. The order of object and verb is object then verb. The order of object, oblique, and verb is object, oblique, then verb.

== Society ==
The Kwoma refer to clans women from their generation as "true sisters." The refer to kinsman of their first generation as "true fathers." Marriage is prohibited between a wide range of relatives, which ensures that marriages are created between clans and villages. There is a common practice where an individual's first marriage is arranged. Divorce is vehemently discouraged during the early years of the marriage. If a divorce does happen, part of the bride's payment is returned. Marriages may be legitimately ended due to the following factors: personal incompatibility, a man taking an additional wife without the first wife's approval, or abandonment by a spouse. If a woman dies soon after she marries, her clansmen may provide a sister to replace her. When a man passes away, his widow is encouraged to marry again. Younger women prefer to have a monogamous marriage. These people take on the ancient custom of marrying relative's widows. This is a safe way for the women to be cared for in a non-sexual marriage. This provides security to the otherwise, perhaps, abandoned widow. In this collectivistic culture, when a male in the family plans to marry, he builds onto the parents' home.

== Socialization ==
The responsibility of raising children and socializing them to the values of the culture rests on parents and any older siblings. Values of strength and independence are inculcated into all relationships while also an understanding of the other's rights. Modeling is a very important social construct in this culture. Young girls are taught how to take care of the home and young boys are taught responsibilities of masculine nature. Men being skilled hunters and people who can participate in warfare is important in this culture. Men are expected to offer women financial incentives such as shell valuables in exchange for marriage opportunities.

== See also ==
- Kwoma-Manambu Pidgin
