= Nukuma languages =

Language family of Papua New Guinea

Nukuma
- Ma
- Geographic distribution: East Sepik Province, in the Sepik River basin of Papua New Guinea
- Linguistic classification: Sepik: Middle Sepik; Nukuma

Language codes
- Glottolog: nuku1256

The Nukuma languages are a small family of three clearly related languages:

- Kwoma
- Kwanga–Mende
  - Kwanga
  - Seim

They are generally classified among the Sepik languages of northern Papua New Guinea; Malcolm Ross places them in a Middle Sepik branch of that family.

They are spoken to the north of the Sepik River near Ambunti, and west of the Ambulas-speaking region of Mapr (near Wosera town).

== Pronouns ==
Pronouns in Nukuma languages:

| pronoun | Kwoma | Mende |
|---|---|---|
| 1SG | an | an ~ na ~ a |
| 2SG.M | mɨ | mi |
| 2SG.F | ni | ɲi |
| 3SG.M | rɨ | or ~ ri |
| 3SG.F | sɨ | os ~ si |
| 1DU | si | ʃi |
| 2DU | ki | ʃi |
| 3DU | pɨr | fri |
| 1PL | no | ni |
| 2PL | kwo | ci |
| 3PL | ye | li |

== Vocabulary comparison ==
The following basic vocabulary words are from Foley (2005) and Laycock (1968), as cited in the Trans-New Guinea database.

The words cited constitute translation equivalents, whether they are cognate (e.g. masək, masiki for “head”) or not (e.g. miːma, nogəpie for “woman”).

| gloss | Kwoma | Mende |
|---|---|---|
| head | masək | masiki |
| ear | fuː; mabiya | mampla |
| eye | miː; miyi | məsokome |
| nose | sumojɨ; sumwonj | miñompo |
| tooth | pu; tarəkwi | fu |
| tongue | kwunja; tarekwoy | tarple |
| leg | yaːte; yati | kumpa |
| louse | nəkə; nɨka | nika |
| dog | asa | asa |
| pig | buri; poyi | |
| bird | apu | afi |
| egg | apo; bey; mpei | fəla |
| blood | pi | fi |
| bone | apo; hapa | hapa |
| skin | mampə | maume |
| breast | muk; muku | muku |
| tree | me | mi |
| man | ma | ma |
| woman | miːma | nogəpie |
| sun | ya | ta |
| moon | nowəka; nɨwɨka | niyaka |
| water | uku | uku |
| fire | hi; hiː | hi |
| stone | papa | süŋkye |
| name | hi | |
| eat | a | |
| one | pochi | |
| two | uprus | frišip |

== See also ==
- Kwoma people
