= Kwasengen language =

Ndu language of Papua New Guinea

Kwasengen
- Hanga Hundi
- Native to: Papua New Guinea
- Region: Sepik River basin
- Native speakers: (7,200 cited 2000 census)
- Language family: Sepik: Middle Sepik; Ndu; Kwasengen

Language codes
- ISO 639-3: wos
- Glottolog: hang1263

Kwasengen, also known as Hanga Hundi, is one of the Ndu languages of Sepik River region of northern Papua New Guinea.
