= Kwoma =

Kwoma may refer to:

- Kwoma people, a people of northeastern New Guinea
- Kwoma language, the language of the Kwoma people
