= Manambu language =

Ndu language of Papua New Guinea

Manambu
- Native to: Papua New Guinea
- Region: Sepik River basin
- Native speakers: 3,000 (2018)
- Language family: Sepik: Middle Sepik; Ndu; Manambu

Language codes
- ISO 639-3: mle
- Glottolog: mana1298
- ELP: Manambu

Manambu is one of the Ndu languages of Sepik River region of northern Papua New Guinea. A Manambu-based pidgin is used with speakers of Kwoma. Manambu has been extensively documented by Alexandra Aikhenvald in a comprehensive grammar.
