= KWJ =

KWJ or kwj may refer to:

- KWJ, the IATA code for Gwangju Airport, South Korea
- kwj, the ISO 639-3 code for Kwanga language, Papua New Guinea
- Kevin Ward Jr. was a Sprint Car driver who killed by Tony Stewart.
- Klaus Iohannis (Klaus Werner Johannis), former president of Romania
