= Sengo language =

Ndu language of Papua New Guinea

Sengo
- Native to: Papua New Guinea
- Region: East Sepik Province
- Native speakers: 520 (2003)
- Language family: Sepik: Middle Sepik; Ndu; Sengo

Language codes
- ISO 639-3: spk
- Glottolog: seng1284
- ELP: Sengo
- Coordinates: 4.009778°S 142.980978°E

Sengo is one of the Ndu languages of Sepik River region of northern Papua New Guinea. It is spoken in Sengo village (4.009778°S 142.980978°E), Burui/Kunai Rural LLG, East Sepik Province.
