= Sos Kundi language =

Ndu language of Papua New Guinea

Sos Kundi
- Native to: Papua New Guinea
- Region: Sepik River basin
- Native speakers: 3,500 (2018 census)
- Language family: Sepik: Middle Sepik; Ndu; Sawos (Malinguat); Sos Kundi

Language codes
- ISO 639-3: sdk
- Glottolog: sosk1235
- ELP: Kwaruwi Kwundi

Sos Kundi is one of the Ndu languages of Sepik River region of northern Papua New Guinea, and is spoken by approximately 3,500 people who live in the East Sepik Province.

English	Sos Kundi
sky	nyiitgu
sorcery	muera
sun	nya
moon	bapmu
lightning	kuilak
thunder	jaatyaki
morning	ganbi
tornado	kujawetetiya'bara
