= Gaikundi language =

Ndu language of Papua New Guinea

Gaikundi
- Native to: Papua New Guinea
- Region: Sepik River basin
- Native speakers: (1,200 cited 2000)
- Language family: Sepik: Middle Sepik; Ndu; Sawos (Malinguat); Gaikundi

Language codes
- ISO 639-3: gbf
- Glottolog: gaik1242
- ELP: Gaikundi

Gaikundi (lit. "village language") is one of the Ndu languages of Sepik River region of northern Papua New Guinea.
