= Keak language =

Ndu language spoken in Papua New Guinea

Keak
- Kwaruwikwundi
- Mevembet
- Native to: Papua New Guinea
- Region: Sepik River basin
- Native speakers: (6,000 cited 1986–2000)
- Language family: Sepik: Middle Sepik; Ndu; Sawos (Malinguat); Keak

Language codes
- ISO 639-3: keh
- Glottolog: keak1239
- ELP: Kwaruwi Kwundi

Keak is an Ndu language of Sepik River region of northern Papua New Guinea.
