= Proto-Indo-European éye-presents =

Proto-Indo-European verbal formation

The Proto-Indo-European éye-present is a type of verbal formation reconstructable on the basis of numerous reflexes in the Indo-European family. The suffix varyingly displays iterative or causative semantics throughout the daughter languages, rendering the original function of the class opaque.

== Semantics ==
In daughter languages, this suffix often formed causative verbs, meaning "to cause to do", or iterative verbs, meaning "to do repeatedly". Most branches, like Germanic, preserve the causative meaning, but some—Greek and Slavic—retain mostly the iterative one. For instance, the Latin verb doceō ("to teach") presumably continues an earlier causative-factitive meaning "make accept, perceive," whereas the parallel Greek term δοκέω ("dokéō," "to expect") lacks any such causativity, though both terms can formally continue Proto-Indo-European *doḱ-éye-ti. Ancient Greek does, however, provide other evidence for the existence of causative-factitive semantics, such as the verb σοβέω ("sobéō," "to scare away"), which perhaps reflects PIE *tyogʷ-éye-ti. The status of this formation in Hittite is unclear, though there are certain terms that have been cited as potential Anatolian reflexes, such as the verbs lukkezzi ("to set aflame") and waššezzi ("to put on"), which may derive from *lowkéyeti and *woséyeti respectively. Alternatively, Kloekhorst prefers to derive these forms from *lukyéti and *usyéti. It has also suggested that certain hi-conjugation verbs in Hittite, such as lāk-, might continue original Proto-Indo-European *éye-verbs, though Jasanoff has denigrated this theory as "literally incredible."

According to the linguist Stephanie W. Jamison, there is no evidence for the iterative sense throughout early Vedic literature, where this suffix is continued as -áyati. The LIV, however, does note the existence of iterative formations in Vedic: It, for instance, considers the verb marjáyati ("to wipe, rub, polish") to reflect a Proto-Indo-European iterative verb of the shape *h₂morǵ-éye-ti. Regarding this particular example, Jamison alternatively argues that it was formed as a causative to the mediopassive mṛṣṭé, the mediopassive form of the synonymous present mā́rṣṭi ("to wipe, purify"). In any case, Jamison—following an even earlier suggestion by Paul Thieme—treats the causative sense as secondary, arguing that the Vedic -áya- are all defined by their transitivity, and that the causative meaning emerged due to the reanalysis of transitives as causatives. However, according to the philologist Alexander Lubotsky, the purely transitive meaning of -áya- verbs means that, in some cases, they are synonymous with their corresponding thematic presents. For instance, the verb várdhati ("to increase, enlarge") is semantically similar to the causative vardháyati ("to cause to grow"), both of which are also potentially reconstructible at the Proto-Indo-Iranian level. Lubotsky argues that it would be unusual for Vedic to preserve two identical formations for centuries, an issue that could be resolved provided that the morphological categories were once semantically different. Regarding the putative "original" meaning of the -áya- verbs, Lubotsky proposes that they were once factitives. In support of this theory, Lubotsky cites the existence of several archaic verbs that form causatives to perfects, such as vedáyati ("to make known"), which parallels the perfect véda ("to be known").

Within Indo-Iranian, the most archaic causative formations exist in opposition to active or mediopassive intransitive verbs. For instance, Sanskrit rocáyati ("to make shine"), which derives from PIE *lowkéyeti, exists beside a deponent present rócate ("to shine"). The formation of causatives from transitive verbal roots was perhaps a later development, whereas—in early Vedic Sanskrit—the causative suffix perhaps remained only productively capable of forming verbs from intransitive or intransitive-transitive verbs. (Note: The concept of "intransitive/transitive" refers to verbs that can pair with an accusative direct object or an oblique (i.e. genitive, dative, or locative) object.) Likewise, in Gothic, the -jan causatives only appear near transitive base verbs when the subject of said verb is themself affected by the action, such as in verbs of eating or position. It is possible that a similar pattern of derivation existed in Proto-Indo-European itself, as there are no attested causatives to transitive verbal roots such as *bʰedʰh₂- ("to dig"), but there are attested causatives formed to intransitive roots such as *bʰewdʰ- ("to be awake"). Alongside *bʰedʰh₂-, the linguist Ranko Matasović cites the root *gʷʰen- ("to strike") as an example of a transitive root without a causative at the PIE level. The LIV, however, does ascribe an iterative éye-present to this same root on the basis of Old Church Slavonic goniti ("to persecute, chase").

The exact relationship between the iterative and causative meanings is unclear, though there is perhaps a parallel example of a similar issue in the sḱé-suffix, which is attested with iterative semantics in some daughter languages, but it also formed causatives in Tocharian. Certain linguists, such as Benjamin Fortson IV, reconstruct the polysemy at the PIE level, thus designating the formation as "causative-iterative." Other linguists, however, prefer to reconstruct either an exclusively causative or iterative meaning, and still others presume an entirely different original semantic function that was neither causative nor iterative. Cross-linguistically, it is not necessarily unusual for causative formations to express additional meanings; in other languages, causative morphology can more generally increase the transitivity of a verb. Like Proto-Indo-European, languages such as Tariana, Tongan, Manambu, and Bouma Fijian also possess morphological causative that can serve as either iterative or intensive formations. The linguist Daniel Kölligan has suggested that, in the prehistory of Latin, the causative or iterative meanings were probably allotted on the basis of agentivity. If the lexical aspect inherent to the semantics of the base verb was non-agentive, then the suffix *-éyeti would transfer the agentivity to an outside source, creating a new causative verb. However, if the base verb was already agentive, then the suffix would only heighten the preexisting agentivity, thereby forming an iterative verb.

== See also ==
- Proto-Indo-European language
- Proto-Indo-European verbs
