= Seim language =

Sepik language spoken in Papua New Guinea

Seim
- Mende
- Native to: Papua New Guinea
- Region: East Sepik Province and Sandaun Province
- Native speakers: 6,000 (2006)
- Language family: Sepik: Middle Sepik; Nukuma; Seim

Language codes
- ISO 639-3: sim
- Glottolog: mend1268
- ELP: Mende
- Coordinates: 3.666057°S 142.570816°E

Seim, or Mende, is a Sepik language of Yirwondi ward and surroundings (3.666057°S 142.570816°E) in Mawase Rural LLG, Sandaun Province, Papua New Guinea.
