= Burui/Kunai Rural LLG =

Local-level government in Papua New Guinea

- Location within Papua New Guinea
- Coordinates: 4.014036°S 143.135397°E
- Country: Papua New Guinea
- Province: East Sepik Province
- Time zone: UTC+10 (AEST)

Burui/Kunai Rural LLG is a local-level government (LLG) of East Sepik Province, Papua New Guinea. Ndu languages are spoken in this LLG.

== Wards ==
- 01. Moi
- 02. Bangwinge/Manja
- 03. Jama No 1
- 04. Jama No 2
- 05. Sengo (Sengo language speakers)
- 06. Buruwi (Burui language speakers)
- 07. Maiwi
- 08. Bensin
- 09. Kwimba
- 10. Kasimbi
- 11. Aurimbit
- 12. Wereman
- 13. Yanget
- 14. Wakiput
- 15. Torembi No 1
- 16. Torembi No 3
- 17. Numagua 1
- 18. Selei
- 19. Miambe
- 20. Worimbi
- 21. Kembiam
- 22. Marap 1
- 23. Marap 2
- 24. Nagusap
- 25. Gaiborobi
