= Keak =

Keak may be,

- Keak language
- Keak da Sneak
