= SDK =

SDK or sdk may refer to:

- Software development kit, a set of software development tools
- Samahang Demokratiko ng Kabataan, a Filipino mass youth organization
- Serbian Volunteer Corps (World War II), or Srpski Dobrovoljački Korpus, a Serbian collaborationist paramilitary group during WWII
- Showa Denko, or Shōwa Denkō Kabushiki-gaisha, a Japanese chemical company
- Slovak Democratic Coalition, or Slovenská demokratická koalícia (1998–2002)
- Social Democrats (Kyrgyzstan), a political party
- Sos Kundi language (ISO 639-3 code: sdk)
- Sandakan Airport, Malaysia (IATA code: SDK)
