= Nggala language =

Ndu language of Papua New Guinea

Ngala
- Sogap
- Native to: Papua New Guinea
- Region: Sepik River basin
- Ethnicity: Sogap people
- Native speakers: 180 (2003)
- Language family: Sepik: Middle Sepik; Ndu; Ngala

Language codes
- ISO 639-3: nud
- Glottolog: ngal1300
- ELP: Ngala
- Coordinates: 4.228038°S 142.51052°E

Ngala, or Sogap, is one of the Ndu languages of Sepik River region of northern Papua New Guinea. It is spoken in the single village of Swagap (4.228038°S 142.51052°E) in Ambunti Rural LLG of East Sepik Province.
