= Sengo =

Sengo may be,

- Sengo language
- Mose Se Sengo, guitarist
- Sengo Muramasa, swordsmith
