= BZF =

BZF may refer to:

- BZF (airline), a Hong Kong passenger airline

== See also ==
- bzf, ISO 639-3 code of the Boiken language
