= Ambunti Rural LLG =

Local-level government in Papua New Guinea

- Location within Papua New Guinea
- Coordinates: 4.215201°S 142.817621°E
- Country: Papua New Guinea
- Province: East Sepik Province
- Time zone: UTC+10 (AEST)

Ambunti Rural LLG is a local-level government (LLG) of East Sepik Province, Papua New Guinea. Various Sepik languages are spoken in the LLG.

== Wards ==
- 01. Ambunti
- 02. Bangus (Yelogu language speakers)
- 03. Waskuk (Kwoma language speakers)
- 04. Beglam (Kwoma language speakers)
- 05. Tangujamb (Kwoma language speakers)
- 06. Singiok
- 07. Amaki 1
- 08. Ablatak
- 09. Waiwos
- 10. Bu-Ur
- 11. Warsei
- 12. Ambuken
- 13. Tauri
- 14. Oum 1
- 15. Oum 2
- 16. Sanapian (Chenapian language speakers)
- 17. Hauna (Pei language speakers)
- 18. Waskuk (Washkuk / Kwoma language speakers)
- 19. Kupkain
- 20. Swagap 1 (Sogap / Nggala language speakers)
- 21. Baku
- 22. Yessan (Yessan language speakers)
- 23. Prukunawi
- 24. Yambun
- 25. Malu
- 26. Yerakai (Yerakai language speakers)
- 27. Garamambu
- 28. Yauambak
- 29. Avatip
- 80. Ambunti Urban
