= Ambulas language =

Ndu language spoken in Papua New Guinea

Ambulas
- Ambelas
- Native to: Papua New Guinea
- Region: Sepik River basin
- Ethnicity: Abelam
- Native speakers: 33,000 (2004)
- Language family: Sepik: Middle Sepik; Ndu; Ambulas

Language codes
- ISO 639-3: abt
- Glottolog: ambu1247
- ELP: Ambulas

Ambulas (or Abelam, Abulas) is a member of the Ndu languages of Sepik River region of northern Papua New Guinea. Dialects are Maprik, Wingei, Wosera-Kamu, Wosera-Mamu.

== Phonology ==
Consonants
		Labial	Alveolar	Palatal	Velar
Plosive/ Affricate	plain	p	t		k
Plosive/ Affricate	prenasal	ᵐb	ⁿd	ᶮdʒ	ᵑg
Nasal		m	n	ɲ	ŋ
Fricative		β	s		
Liquid	lateral		l		
Liquid	rhotic		r		
Semivowel		w		j	

Vowels
	Front	Central	Back
High	(i) (Note: [i, u] may be heard as a realization of the sequences /əj/, /əw/ or resulting in syllabic forms of /j, w/.)	ɨ	(u)
Mid		ə	
Low		a	

== Vocabulary ==
=== Word-Formation ===
==== Reduplication ====
Most words in Ambulas are roots, although some word-stems are reduplicated, compounded, or derived.

Examples of Reduplication
Stem	Meaning
pepe (noun)	"flying fox species"
kiyakiya (noun)	"fever"
kwaskwas (noun)	"frog species"
jékjék (adjective)	"tough"
nyeknyek (adjective)	"soft"

==== Compound Stems ====
In Ambulas, compound stems occur within nouns (including temporal nouns and quantifiers) and verbs.

Examples of Noun Stems
Stem 1	Stem 2	Compound Stem
méni "eye"	taama "nose"	ménidama "face"
kaadé "hunger"	mu "thing"	kadému "food"
séré "tomorrow"	maa "day after"	séréma "in the future"
nak "one"	waasa "dog"	nakwasa "four"
nak "one"	taaba "hand"	naktaba "five"

Examples of Verb Stems
Stem 1	Stem 2	Compound Stem
ra "sit"	ségé "watch"	raségé "look after"
bul "talk"	tégé "close"	bultépé "interrupt"
taak "break sharply"	burép "touch against"	takuburép "chip against"
taa "carve"	kény "whittle"	taakény "carve something small"

==== Derivational Stems ====
Adjective stems can be formed by adding suffixes, such as -mama (meaning "possessing much"), to noun roots or noun stems.

Examples of Noun Root Suffixing
Root	-mama stem suffixation
apa "strength"	apamama "very strong"
yéwaa "money"	yéwamama "very wealthy"
baalé "pig"	balémama "possessing many pigs"

Examples of Noun Stem Suffixing
Root	-mama stem suffixation
kadému "food"	kadémumama "possessing much food"
gwalmu "money"	gwalmumama "very wealthy in possessions"
