= Angoram Airport =

Airport in Angoram, Papua New Guinea

- IATA: AGG; ICAO: none

Summary
- Serves: Angoram, East Sepik Province, Papua New Guinea
- Coordinates: 4°03′25.4″S 144°04′26.3″E
- Interactive map of Angoram Airport

Angoram Airport (IATA: AGG) is an airfield serving Angoram, Papua New Guinea. It was established before World War II, but is now mostly unused. It was previously served by Ansett Airlines of Papua New Guinea.

The airport has one operational airstrip, the Brahman Airstrip (IATA: BRH), operating one runway (1/19).
