= Swagap people =

The Swagap are one of the indigenous peoples of Papua New Guinea. They are also known as the Insect Tribe. They speak the Nggala language (also called Swagap or Sogap), which is one of the Sepik languages belonging to the Ndu branch.

== Homelife ==
The tribe lives in a village that sits above the waters of the Sepik River, named Sawagap. The tribe live off fish and other animals that they hunt in the jungle, but their chief source of income comes from crocodile skin.

== Religious beliefs ==
They worship the praying mantis.

== Discovery and outside contact ==
They were unknown to the outside world until the 1950s.

More recently, they were the subject of a documentary by Donal MacIntyre in 2007, in which six members of the tribe, including their chief, Joseph, were flown to the United Kingdom as part of the special Return of the Tribe.
