= Abelam people =

Abelam
Total population
- 70.000

Languages
- Abelam

Religion
- Christianity (Roman Catholicism Protestantism), traditional beliefs

Related ethnic groups
- Sepik-speaking peoples Especially Iatmul and Swagap

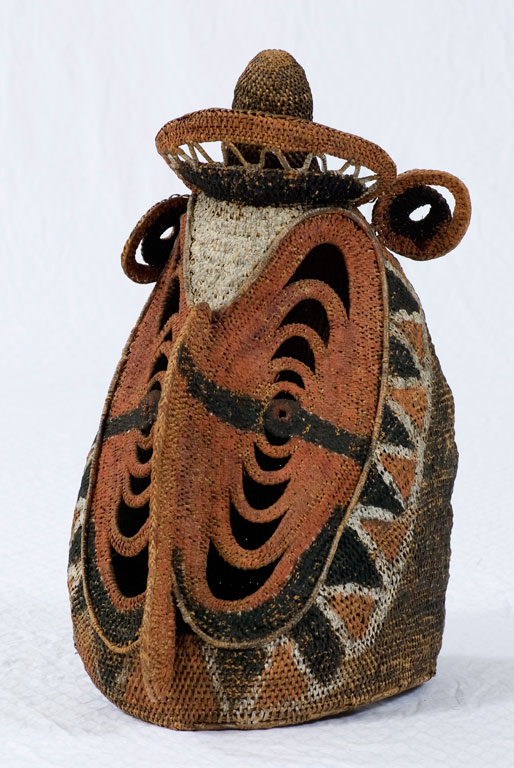
An Abelam yam harvest ceremony spirit mask (baba) in the permanent collection of The Children's Museum of Indianapolis

The Abelam are a people who live in East Sepik Province of Papua New Guinea. They are a farming society in which giant yams play a significant role. They live in the Prince Alexander Mountains near the north coast of the island. Their language belongs to the Sepik language family.

== Farming and hunting ==
The Abelam live in the tropical rain forest and clear ground by burning. Their main food crops are yams, taro, bananas, and sweet potatoes. They supplement this with food gathered from the rain forest as well as pigs and chickens raised domestically. They also hunt small marsupials and cassowaries.

== Yams ==
Yam growing forms a large part of Abelam society. The growing of large yams (they can be as large as 80-90 inches (2.3 m) long) determines the status of individuals as well as the whole village. At yam festivals an individual would give his largest yam to his worst enemy who would then be obligated to grow an even larger yam or have his status fall each year in which he was unable to do so. Separate villages would gather at yam festivals where the hosting village's status would be determined by the size of their yams as well as their ability to provide more food than could be eaten and carried away by the rival village.

During the yam growing season, strong emotions were kept to a minimum as they were thought to impede the growth of the yams. Fighting was taboo as was sexual activity. It was thought that the yams had a spirit and could sense any of these strong emotions.
