= Victor Emanuel Range =

Mountain range in Papua New Guinea

- Location within Papua New Guinea

Geography
- State: Papua New Guinea
- Range coordinates: 5°18′S 142°00′E
- Parent range: Island of New Guinea

The Victor Emanuel Range is a limestone mountain range in the New Guinea Highlands of western Papua New Guinea. It was named after the King of Italy by the Italian naturalist Luigi D'Albertis while he was charting the course of the Fly River, which originates at this range. To the north, the headwaters of the Sepik River are also found here. This range rises to 3,310 m (10,860 ft), forming a spur of the Star Mountains to the east.
