= Angoram/Middle Sepik Rural LLG =

Local-level government in Papua New Guinea

- Location within Papua New Guinea
- Coordinates: 4.050312°S 144.073038°E
- Country: Papua New Guinea
- Province: East Sepik Province
- Time zone: UTC+10 (AEST)

Angoram/Middle Sepik Rural LLG is a local-level government (LLG) of East Sepik Province, Papua New Guinea.

== Wards ==
- 01. Changriwa (Changriwa language speakers)
- 02. Marambao
- 03. Kanduanum
- 04. Krinjambi
- 05. Tambari
- 06. Agrumara
- 07. Yuarma
- 08. Mundomundo
- 09. Kambrindo
- 10. Moim
- 11. Pinang
- 12. Magendo 1
- 13. Magendo 2
- 15. Ex Service Camp
- 16. Angoram Village
- 17. Gavieng Resett 1
- 18. Gavieng Resett 2
- 19. Gavieng Resett 3
- 20. Gavieng Resett 4
- 21. Tambunum
- 22. Wombun
- 23. Timbunke
- 24. Angriman
- 25. Mindimbit
- 26. Kamanimbit
- 27. Kararau
- 28. Timboli
- 29. Indigum
- 30. Chikinumbu
- 31. Chimbian
- 32. Saui
- 33. Kingavi
- 34. Koiwat (Koiwat language speakers)
- 35. Paimbit
- 81. Angoram Urban
