= Angoram =

- Location within Papua New Guinea
- Coordinates: 4°4′S 144°4′E
- Country: Papua New Guinea
- Province: East Sepik Province
- District: Angoram District
- LLG: Angoram-Middle Sepik Rural LLG
- Time zone: UTC+10 (AEST)
- Climate: Af

Angoram is a town and seat of Angoram District in East Sepik Province in north-western Papua New Guinea. The area is noted for its rubber and cocoa plantations and the town is situated on the Sepik River. The town is served by Angoram Airport. It is part of Angoram-Middle Sepik Rural LLG.

== See also ==
- https://www.traveladventures.org/continents/oceania/angoram.html
