= Ndu languages =

Family of Sepik languages of Papua New Guinea

Ndu
- Geographic distribution: East Sepik Province, in the Sepik River basin of Papua New Guinea
- Linguistic classification: Sepik: Middle Sepik; Ndu
- Subdivisions: 8–12 languages

Language codes
- Glottolog: nduu1242

The Ndu languages are the best known family of the Sepik languages of East Sepik Province in northern Papua New Guinea. Ndu is the word for 'man' in the languages that make up this group. The languages were first identified as a related family by Kirschbaum in 1922.

Along with the Arapesh languages, Ndu languages are among the best documented languages in the Sepik basin, with comprehensive grammars available for many languages.

A diagnostic innovative feature in the Ndu languages is the replacement of the proto-Sepik pronoun *wun ‘I’ with proto-Ndu *an ~ *na.

== Languages ==
Ambulas is the most populous language, with about 45,000 speakers, though Iatmül is better known to the outside world. There are eight to twelve Ndu languages; Usher (2020) counts nine:

- Ngala
- Ndu proper
  Iatmul, Manambu, Yelogu (Yalaku), Ambulas (Abelam), Boiken–Koiwat, Gaikundi, Sos Kundi (Sawos Kundi)

Also sometimes distinguished are Keak (close to Iatmul or Sos Kundi), Kwasengen (or Hanga Hundi, close to Ambulas), Burui (close to Gai Kundi), and Sengo.

== Phonology ==
Most Sepik and neighboring languages have systems of three vowels, /ɨ ə a/, that are distinct only in height. Phonetic [i e u o] are a result of palatal and labial assimilation of /ɨ ə/ to adjacent consonants. The Ndu languages may take this reduction a step further: In these languages, /ɨ/ is used as an epenthetic vowel to break up consonant clusters in compound words. Within words, /ɨ/ only occurs between similar consonants, and seems to be explicable as epenthesis there as well, so that the only underlying vowels that need to be assumed are /ə/ and /a/. That is, the Ndu languages may be a rare case of a two-vowel system, the others being the Arrernte and Northwest Caucasian languages. However, contrasting analyses of these same languages may posit a dozen vowel monophthongs.

For Ndu languages, the glottalized low vowel /a̭/ is often written as /aʔa/. This does not signify /a/ followed by a glottal stop and another /a/.

== Morphology ==
Ndu languages mark first and second person possessors with -n, and third person possessors with -k.

Ambulas

wunɨ-nə mbalɨ
1SG-POSS pig
‘my pig’

ndɨ-ku mbalɨ
3SG-POSS pig
‘his pig’

Manambu

wun-(n)a maːm
1SG-POSS older.sibling
‘my elder sister’

ndɨ-kɨ-ndɨ yaːmb
3SG-POSS-M.SG road
‘his road’

Ndu languages make use of the general locative case suffix -mb (-m in Manambu):

Ambulas

kwalɨ kambɨlɨ-mbə
neck river-LOC
‘at the source of the river’

Manambu

ŋgu-aːm
water-LINK.LOC
‘in water’

Ndu languages have two dative-type case markers, with the forms and meanings varying across languages:

- -t (-r in Manambu): allative meaning (‘to’ or ‘toward’)
- -k: benefactive (beneficiary or recipient) meaning

Examples of dative case markers in Ambulas and Manambu:

Ambulas

ndu mbɨrɨ takwə mbɨr-ət
man PL woman PL-ALL
‘toward the men and women’

ɲjɨmba yə-kwə ndu-kɨ
work do-PRS man-BEN
‘for the men who work’

Manambu

ar-aːr yi-tɨk
lake-LINK.ALL go-1DU.SBJ.IMP
‘Let’s both go to the lake.’

a-ndɨ ɲɨnɨk
that-M.SG child.LINK.BEN
‘for that child’

Dative case markers are also used to mark animate objects of transitive verbs, which is a Sepik-Ramu areal feature. An example of the Ambulas allative case marker -t:

wunɨ ɲan-ɨt kenək-kwə
1SG child-ALL scold-PRS
‘I’m scolding the child.’

== Proto-language ==
Proto-Ndu
- Reconstruction of: Ndu languages

=== Pronouns ===
Reconstructed proto-Ndu pronouns by Foley (2005):

	sg	du	pl
1	*wɨn	*an	*nan
2m	*mɨn	*mpɨr	*ŋkɨwr
2f	*ɲɨn	*mpɨr	*ŋkɨwr
3m	*ntɨ	*mpɨr	*ntəy
3f	*lɨ	*mpɨr	*ntəy

Note that there is a gender distinction for first-person pronouns.

=== Lexicon ===
A phonological reconstruction of proto-Ndu has been proposed by Foley (2005). Lexical reconstructions from Foley (2005) are listed below. The homeland of proto-Ndu is located just upstream of Ambunti.

Proto-Ndu reconstructions by Foley (2005)
gloss	proto-Ndu	Manambu	Iatmul	Abelam	Sawos	Boiken	Ngala
one	*nək	nək	kɨta	nek	kɨtak	napə	nək
man	*ntɨw	ntiw	ntɨw	ntɨw		tɨw	riw
water	*ŋkɨw	ŋkɨw	ŋkɨw	ŋkɨw	ŋkɨw	kɨw	ŋkɨw
rain	*mayt	war	mayk	mac	wirɨ	macɲ	mac
fire	*ya	ya	ya	ya		hwɨypa	ya
sun	*ɲa	ɲə	ɲa	ɲa		ɲa	ɲa
moon	*mpapmɨw	mpapɨw	mpwap	mpapmɨw		pwapwə	kamwɨ
house	*ŋkəy	wɨy	ŋkəy	ŋkəy	ŋkay	kəy	ŋkəy
breast	*mɨwɲ	mɨwɲ	mɨpə	mɨwɲə		mwɨyɲ	mɨwɲ
tooth	*nɨmpɨy	ɨwk	nɨmpɨy	nɨmpɨy		nɨmpɨy	nɨmpɨy
bone	*apə	ap	avə	apə		yapə	ampɨ
tongue	*tɨkŋa	tɨkalɨr	tɨkat	tɨkŋalɨn		tɨkŋalɨ	tɨkan
eye	*mɨyR	mɨyr	mɨynɨy	mɨynɨy		mɨynɨy	mɨyl
nose	*tam(w)ə	tam	tamə	tamə		tamə	tamwə
leg	*man	man	man	man	man	man	rawɨ
ear	*wan	wan	wan	wan		wan	
tree	*mɨy	mɨy	mɨy	mɨy		mɨy	mɨy
name	*cɨ	cɨ	cɨ	ɨy		cɨ	cɨ
pig	*mp(w)al	mpar	mpak	mpalɨ		pwalɨ	mpwal
dog	*wac, *war	ac	warə	wacə		warə	pyəp
snake	*kampwəy	kampay	kampwəy	kampwəy		hampwəy	mapwɨcɨ
mosquito	*kɨvɨy	kɨvɨy	kɨvyə	kwɨyə		mɨkɨycɨ	cɨvyə
see	*vɨ	vɨ	vɨ	vɨ		vɨ	təyf
eat	*kɨ	kɨ	kɨ	kə		hə	kɨ
go	*yɨ	yɨ	yɨ	yɨ	yɨ	yɨ	yɨ
come	*ya	ya	ya	ya		ya	ya
sit	*rə	rɨ	rɨ	rə		rə	yəlkɨy
stand	*rap(m)	rap	rap	rapm		rapm	
