= Boiken Creek =

River in Papua New Guinea

- Location within Papua New Guinea

Location
- Country: Papua New Guinea
- Region: East Sepik Province

Physical characteristics
- Source
  - location: Papua New Guinea
- Mouth
  - coordinates: 3°26′00″S 143°27′00″E

Boiken Creek is a creek in northern Papua New Guinea.

== See also ==
- List of rivers of Papua New Guinea
- Boiken language
