= Yerakai language =

Sepik language of Papua-New Guinea

Yerakai
- Native to: Papua New Guinea
- Region: East Sepik Province
- Native speakers: (380 cited 2000 census)
- Language family: Sepik: Middle Sepik; Ndu–Yerekai; Yerakai

Language codes
- ISO 639-3: yra
- Glottolog: yera1243
- ELP: Yerakai
- Coordinates: 4.280234°S 142.924084°E

Yerakai (Yerekai) is a Sepik language spoken in Sandaun Province, Papua-New Guinea. It is highly divergent from other Sepik languages, being only 6% cognate with other Middle Sepik languages. Glottolog classifies it as an isolate.

It is spoken in Yerakai (4.280234°S 142.924084°E) village, Yerakai ward, Ambunti Rural LLG, East Sepik Province.
