= Grassroots Business Fund =

American non-profit organization

- Type: Non-profit organization
- Founded: June 2008
- Founder: Harold Rosen
- Website: www.gbfund.org

The Grassroots Business Fund (GBF) is a non-profit organization based in Washington, DC. It has field offices in Kenya, Peru, and India. It primarily supports businesses across Africa, Latin America, and India. GBF has managed over $100 million and invested worldwide in small to medium-sized businesses across sectors including agriculture, clean energy, and healthcare.

== History ==
In 2000, at the International Finance Corporation (IFC), Harold Rosen founded the Small and Medium Enterprise (SME) department, a joint IFC/World Bank department. In 2004, Rosen started the Grassroots Business Initiatives (GBI), which began as an IFC initiative, aimed to build sustainable, non-financial intermediaries that would empower large numbers of High Impact Businesses and individual producers, consumers, and entrepreneurs. GBI worked directly with High Impact Businesses to strengthen their business performance, scale up their operations, and improve their sustainability. From 2004 to 2007, GBI implemented over 40 technical assistance projects and investments impacting the lives of over 3.4 million direct and indirect beneficiaries at the bottom of the socio-economic pyramid.

In 2008, the GBI department was transformed into an independent organization called the Grassroots Business Fund (GBF).

== Leadership ==
Harold Rosen is the Executive Director of the Grassroots Business Fund. Harold spent 30 years managing IFC's emerging markets investments and leading IFC into new geographic areas and sectors, such as microfinance, technical assistance and SMEs. He founded the World Bank's group SME department, and then spun this off into Grassroots Business Fund, an independent organization funded by IFC and a number of others.

== Portfolio ==
GBF makes equity, quasi-equity, and debt investments. To date, GBF has invested $7 million invested in 26 businesses across 10 countries.

== Impact ==
During 2009, Keystone supported GBF to make a significant investment in its own evaluation systems, captured in what they believe is a 'best in class' framework called Impact Planning, Assessment and Learning (iPAL) framework, which allows GBF and its clients to better respond to results and experiences of their beneficiaries.

iPAL effectively measures, analyzes and communicates the poverty alleviation impact of its clients, not only for internal purposes, but more importantly to guide and support its clients’ social mission. In doing so, GBF focuses on capturing impact data from its clients rather than just narrative reports. GBF's initial focus is determining metrics that allow its clients to set and manage objectives, improve impacts, and strengthen management systems. GBF integrates its iPAL framework throughout the investment life cycle and ensures that iPAL is integrated into its clients’ business processes. GBF tailors iPAL to each GBO, which includes basic reporting on activities and outputs, a survey-based review of beneficiary impacts, a social return on investment calculation, and client feedback.

== Awards ==
The Group of 20 and Ashoka's Changemakers, with support from the Rockefeller Foundation, have launched an online competition to find the best models worldwide for public-private partnerships that catalyze finance for small and medium enterprises (SMEs). The G-20 SME Finance Challenge, the first ever competition launched by the G-20, was a financial inclusion effort with the mission of helping entrepreneurs.

GBF was named one of 14 winners out of over 350 submitted proposals. The winners received funding and GBF's executive director, Harold Rosen, accepted an invitation to the November 2010 G-20 Summit in South Korea. At this event, he joined leaders from around the world to discuss SME's role in poverty alleviation. This included GBF's impact and proclaimed solutions to world problems.
