= Boiken language =

Ndu language of Papua New Guinea

Boiken
- Native to: Papua New Guinea
- Region: Sepik River basin
- Native speakers: 35,000 (2004)
- Language family: Sepik: Middle Sepik; Ndu; Boiken

Language codes
- ISO 639-3: bzf
- Glottolog: boik1241
- ELP: Boiken

Boiken (Nucum, Yangoru) is one of the more populous of the Ndu languages of Sepik River region of northern Papua New Guinea. It is spoken around Boiken Creek in Yangoru-Saussia District, East Sepik Province and adjacent islands off the north coast of northern Papua New Guinea.

== Phonology ==
Boiken consonants
		Labial	Dental	Alveolar	Dorsal	Glottal
Nasal		m	n̪	n	(ŋ)	
Stop		p		t	k	(ʔ)
Affricate			t̪s̪			
Fricative	voiceless	ɸ		s	x	
Fricative	voiced				ɣ	
Approximant		w	l̪		j	
Trill				r		
Flap				ɺ		

- Stop sounds /p, t̪s̪, t, k/ are heard as voiced [b, d̪z̪, d, ɡ] when following a nasal counterpart.
- /k/ has an allophone of a glottal [ʔ] in word-final position, or when preceding a consonant in word-medial position.
- Sounds /ɸ, s, x/ can be voiced as [β, z, ɣ] in intervocalic positions.
- /n/ is heard as [ŋ] when preceding velar consonants, or freely in word-final position.
- /r/ can be heard as a voiceless trill [r̥] in word-initial positions.

Boiken vowels
	Front	Central	Back
Close	i	ɨ	u
Mid	e	ə	o
Open	æ	a	ɒ

- /ɨ, ə/ have allophones of [ɪ, ɛ] when following dental and alveolar sounds.
- /u/ has an allophone of [ʊ] when preceding /k/ heard as a glottal [ʔ] in word-medial and word-final positions.
- /o/ has an allophone of [ɔ] when following labial and velar sounds.
