= Kwanga language =

Sepik language of Papua New Guinea

Kwanga
- Native to: Papua New Guinea
- Region: East Sepik Province and Sandaun Province
- Native speakers: (10,000 cited 2001)
- Language family: Sepik: Middle Sepik; Nukuma; Kwanga

Language codes
- ISO 639-3: kwj
- Glottolog: kwan1278
- ELP: Kwanga

Kwanga (Gawanga) is a Sepik language spoken in Gawanga Rural LLG of East Sepik Province, Papua New Guinea.

== Classification ==
There are two main dialects, and five subdialects. The 14th (2000) edition of Ethnologue classified Apos, Bongos, Wasambu, and Yubanakor as distinct languages, and assigned them the ISO codes apo, bxy, wsm, and yuo, respectively. They have since been subsumed under Kwanga.

Dialects are:

- Apos (3.669176°S 142.805008°E)
- Bongos (Bongomaise, Bongomamsi, Kambaminchi, Nambi) (3.736685°S 142.658084°E, 3.803884°S 142.649997°E)
- Tau (Kubiwat, Mangamba, Nambes) (3.670041°S 142.722921°E, 3.65948°S 142.678695°E)
- Wasambu (3.758898°S 142.695393°E)
- Yubanakor (Daina) (3.72789°S 142.877836°E, 3.73855°S 142.875091°E, 3.78335°S 142.765707°E)
