= Kwoma people =

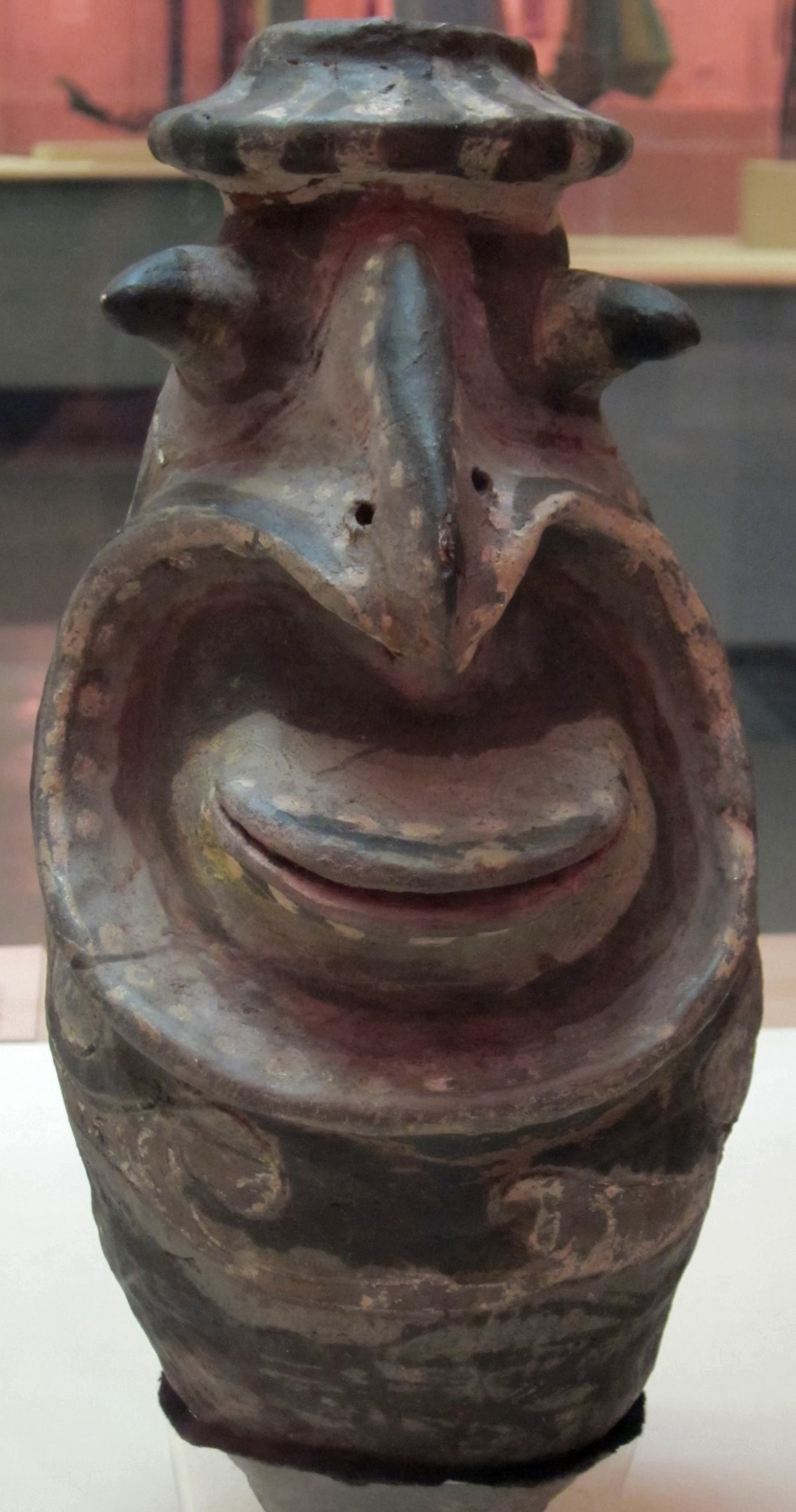
Water container, Papua New Guinea, Washkuk Mountains, Kwoma people, Honolulu Academy of Arts

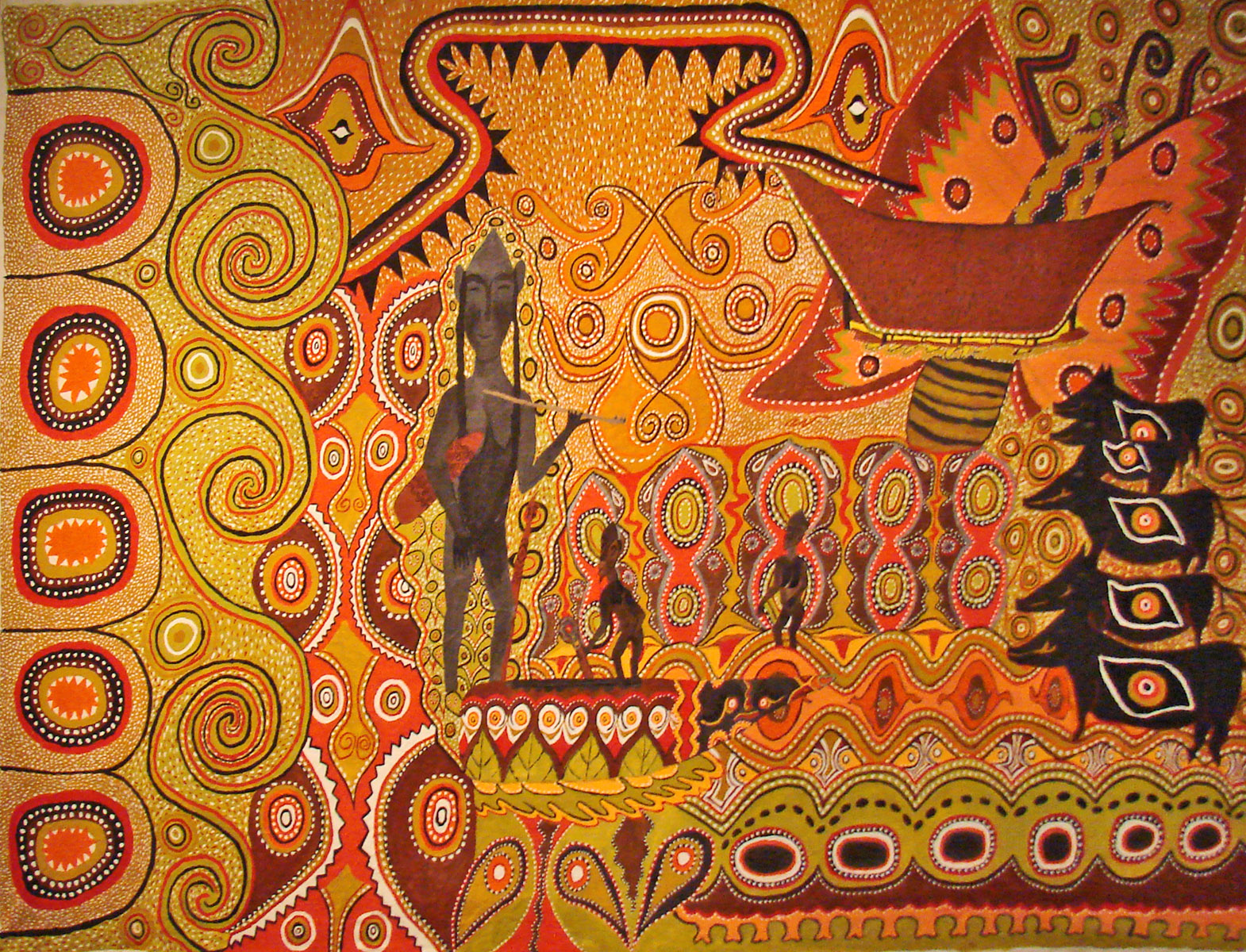
Painting by a Kwoma artist

The Kwoma are a people of northeastern New Guinea who live in the Peilungupo mountains north of the Sepik River. They speak the Kwoma language.

== Land ==
The climate is warm and humid, with rain falling almost every day, so that crops may be planted at any time of the year. The Kwoma territory consists of ridges with precipitous sides, nowhere rising above 1,500 feet, covered by a very dense forest canopy, as well as adjacent lowland swamps full of sago palms, an important food.

Birds are abundant, but feral pigs are the only large mammals. Coconut and areca palms, pawpaw, breadfruit, and paper mulberry trees are planted near housesites, and yams, taro, and greens are grown as the first crop in swidden gardens, with bananas and plantains as the second crop.

== People ==
The total population in 1936, the year in which the Kwoma were studied by ethnographers, was less than a thousand (in 2003, three thousand). They are surrounded by other peoples, most with even smaller populations, who speak unrelated languages. The Kwoma will speak in their own language to these outsiders, who will respond in their own language, so that intertribal communication relies upon understanding other languages, not speaking them. Relations with outsiders are often hostile, and even relations among the four Kwoma subtribes can be violent, with members of one subtribe setting out on head-hunting expeditions against another.

Each subtribe consists of several hamlets, containing households with hereditary property rights in the hamlet's land. Each hamlet contains a male ceremonial house as its focal point. All of the adult males in a hamlet are members of the same patrilineal sib, but the hamlets of each sib are not contiguous, so that the sibs are scattered about in each subtribe territory.

Each sib claims descent from a mythical totem ancestor, and each sib is further subdivided into lineages claiming descent from a legendary hero. Within a hamlet, members of the same lineage will typically build their houses adjacent to each other. Within a lineage, descendants of a common paternal grandfather will be especially close, and sons will live adjacent to or with their father.

The Kwoma language is in the Middle Sepik stock, and their kinship system is of the Omaha type. The political system is acephalous and relatively egalitarian, though prestige is accorded senior men who have taken a head in warfare. these men hold high positions in religious cults and often have more than one wife. In the resolution of legal disputes, all males past puberty preside and have an equal voice in the final decision.

The sexual division of labor is such that both males and females work in the extraction of sago flour, and each sex has specified tasks in the gardens, but only males hunt and build houses, and only females fish. Most fish is obtained through trade, with females exchanging sago flour for fish with members of river tribes on periodic market days, occurring once or twice a week.

John Whiting's ethnography of the Kwoma, based on fieldwork conducted in 1936, was a groundbreaking effort to describe the socialization of children in a traditional, non-Western culture.
