= Ambunti =

- Location within Papua New Guinea
- Coordinates: 4.22°S 142.83°E
- Country: Papua New Guinea
- Province: East Sepik Province
- District: Ambunti-Dreikikier District
- LLG: Ambunti Rural LLG

Population
  - Total: 2,110

Languages
  - Main languages: English, Tok Pisin, Kairiru, Boikin
  - Traditional languages: Kairiru
- Time zone: UTC+10 (AEST)

Ambunti is a town in Ambunti-Dreikikier District of East Sepik Province in Papua New Guinea. It has a population of 2,110.

The town serves as a gateway to April Salome Forest Management Area.

The patrol base at Ambunti featured in the 1971 documentary A Blank on the Map.

The Middle Sepik Languages are spoken nearby

== See also ==
- Ambunti Rural LLG
