= Middle Sepik languages =

Groups of Sepik languages

Middle Sepik
- Geographic distribution: East Sepik Province, in the Sepik River basin of Papua New Guinea
- Linguistic classification: Sepik: Middle Sepik
- Subdivisions: Nukuma–Tama; Ndu–Yerekai

Language codes
- Glottolog: None
- The Sepik languages as classified by Foley (2018)

The Middle Sepik languages comprise diverse groups of Sepik languages spoken in northern Papua New Guinea. The Middle Sepik grouping is provisionally accepted by Foley (2018) based on shared innovations in pronouns, but is divided by Glottolog. They are spoken in areas surrounding the town of Ambunti in East Sepik Province.

Unlike most other Sepik languages, Middle Sepik languages do not overtly mark gender on nouns, although the third-person singular pronoun does distinguish between masculine and feminine genders (e.g., Proto-Ndu *nd- '3SG.M' and *l- '3SG.F').

== Languages ==
The languages are:

- Middle Sepik languages
  - Ma–Tama
    - Nukuma languages (see)
    - Tama languages (see)
  - Ndu–Yerekai
    - Ndu–Nggala
      - Nggala
      - Ndu languages (see)
    - Yerakai (Garamambu)
