= Sepik =

River in New Guinea

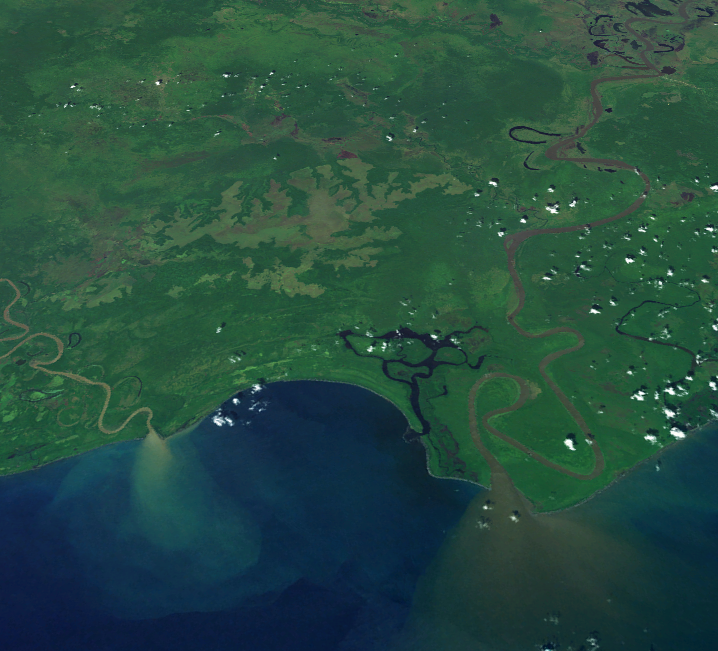
- Sediment plumes at the mouth of the Sepik (right) and Ramu (left) rivers

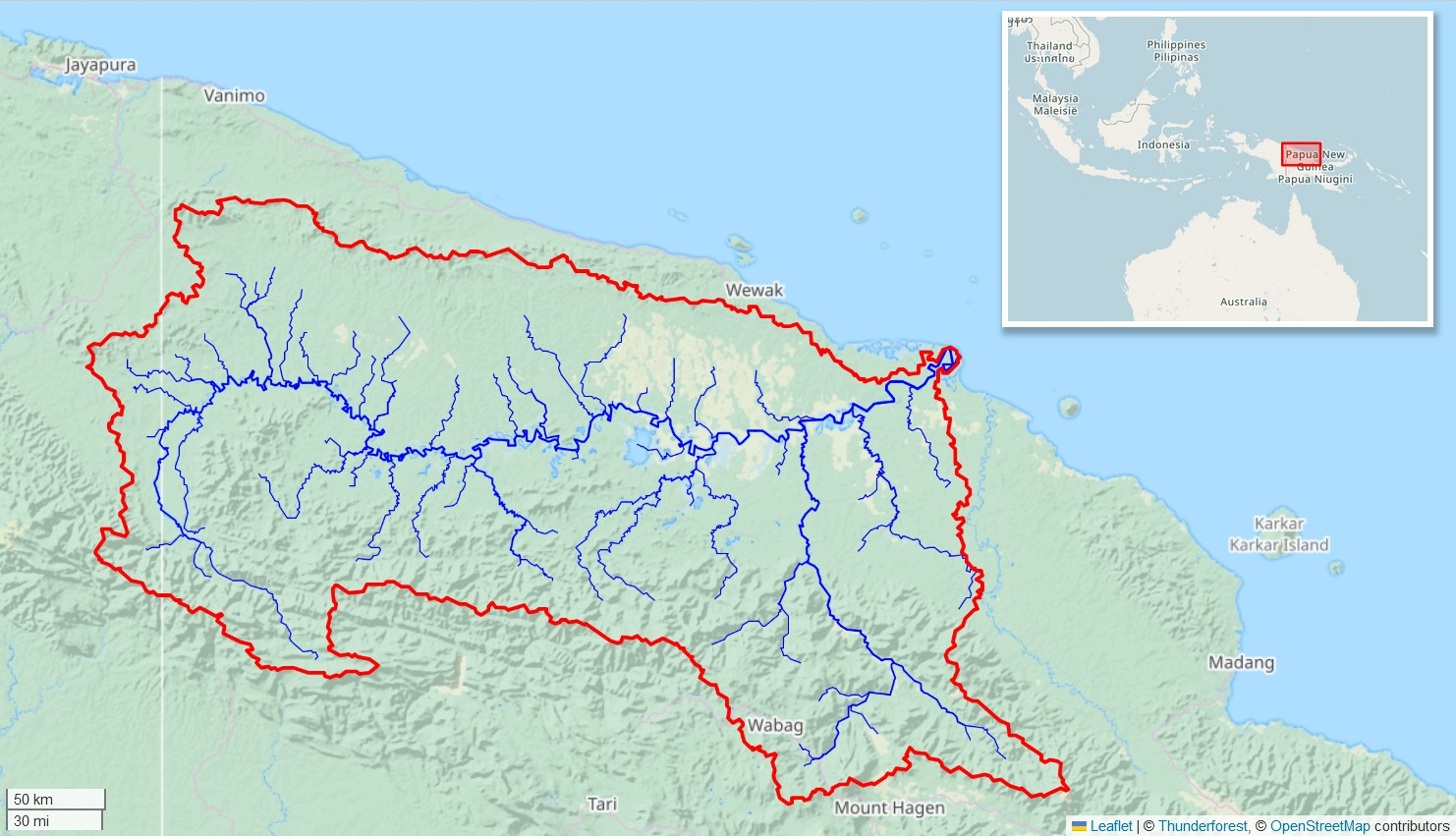
- Sepik River watershed (Interactive map)

Location
- Country: Papua New Guinea, Indonesia
- Region: Sandaun, Papua, East Sepik

Physical characteristics
- Source
  - location: Victor Emanuel Range
  - coordinates: 5°13′S 141°49′E
  - elevation: 2,170 m (7,120 ft)
- Mouth
  - location: Bismarck Sea, Papua New Guinea
  - coordinates: 3°50′30″S 144°32′30″E
  - elevation: 0 m (0 ft)
- Length: 1,126 km (700 mi)
- Basin size: 80,321 km^{2} (31,012 sq mi)
- Width
  - average: 400–500 m (1,300–1,600 ft)
- Depth
  - minimum: 2 m (6 ft 7 in)
  - average: 8–14 m (26–46 ft)
  - maximum: 35–55 m (115–180 ft) (Angoram)
- Discharge
  - location: Angoram
  - average: 5,000 m^{3}/s (180,000 cu ft/s)
- Discharge
  - location: Ambunti
  - average: 3,615 m^{3}/s (127,700 cu ft/s)

Basin features
- Progression: Bismarck Sea
- River system: Sepik River
- Tributaries
  - left: Iram, Brucken, Oklip, Hauser, Horden, North, Yellow, Sanchi, Yimi, Nagam
  - right: Hak, August, May, Seniap, Frieda, Wario, Wagamush, April, Karawari, Yuat, Keram, Bien

The Sepik (/ˈsiːpɪk/) is the longest river on the island of New Guinea, and the third largest in Oceania by discharge volume after the Fly and Mamberamo. The majority of the river flows through the Papua New Guinea (PNG) provinces of Sandaun (formerly West Sepik) and East Sepik, with a small section flowing through the Indonesian province of Papua.

The Sepik has a large catchment area, and landforms that include swamplands and mountains. Biologically, the river system is often said to be possibly the largest uncontaminated freshwater wetland system in the Asia-Pacific region. Numerous fish and plant species have been introduced into the Sepik since the mid-20th century.

== Name ==
In 1884, Germany asserted control over the northeast quadrant of the island of New Guinea, which became part of the German colonial empire. The colony was initially managed by the Deutsche Neuguinea-Kompagnie or German New Guinea Company, a commercial enterprise that christened the territory Kaiser-Wilhelmsland. The first European ship to enter the Sepik estuary was the Samoa in May 1885. But the river, in fact, did not yet have a European name. It was thus termed Kaiserin Augustafluß by the explorer and scientist Otto Finsch, after the German Empress Augusta.

The word Sipik was first reported by A. Full as one of two names for the watercourse—the other being Abschima—used by the natives living at the mouth of the river. A few years later, Leonhard Schultze applied the term Sepik to the entire watercourse, and it took, although Schultze also noted another name for the river, Azimar. William Churchill, writing in the Bulletin of the American Geographical Society, said "These are not names of the river, they are but names for small stretches of the river as known to the folk of this or that hamlet. We cannot reckon how many such names there may be in the course of more than 600 miles [970 km] of the system." Since "there is no indigenous name for the whole stream", Churchill concluded that "This is clearly a case where a European designation may properly be applied." He advocated for Kaiserin-Augusta, but that name faded with the German loss of colonial control over the territory after World War I. The word Sepik henceforth became the official name of the river.

Of course, each language group had one or more names of its own for the river. For example, the Iatmul people call the river Avusett, a compound of "bone" (ava) and "lake" (tset).

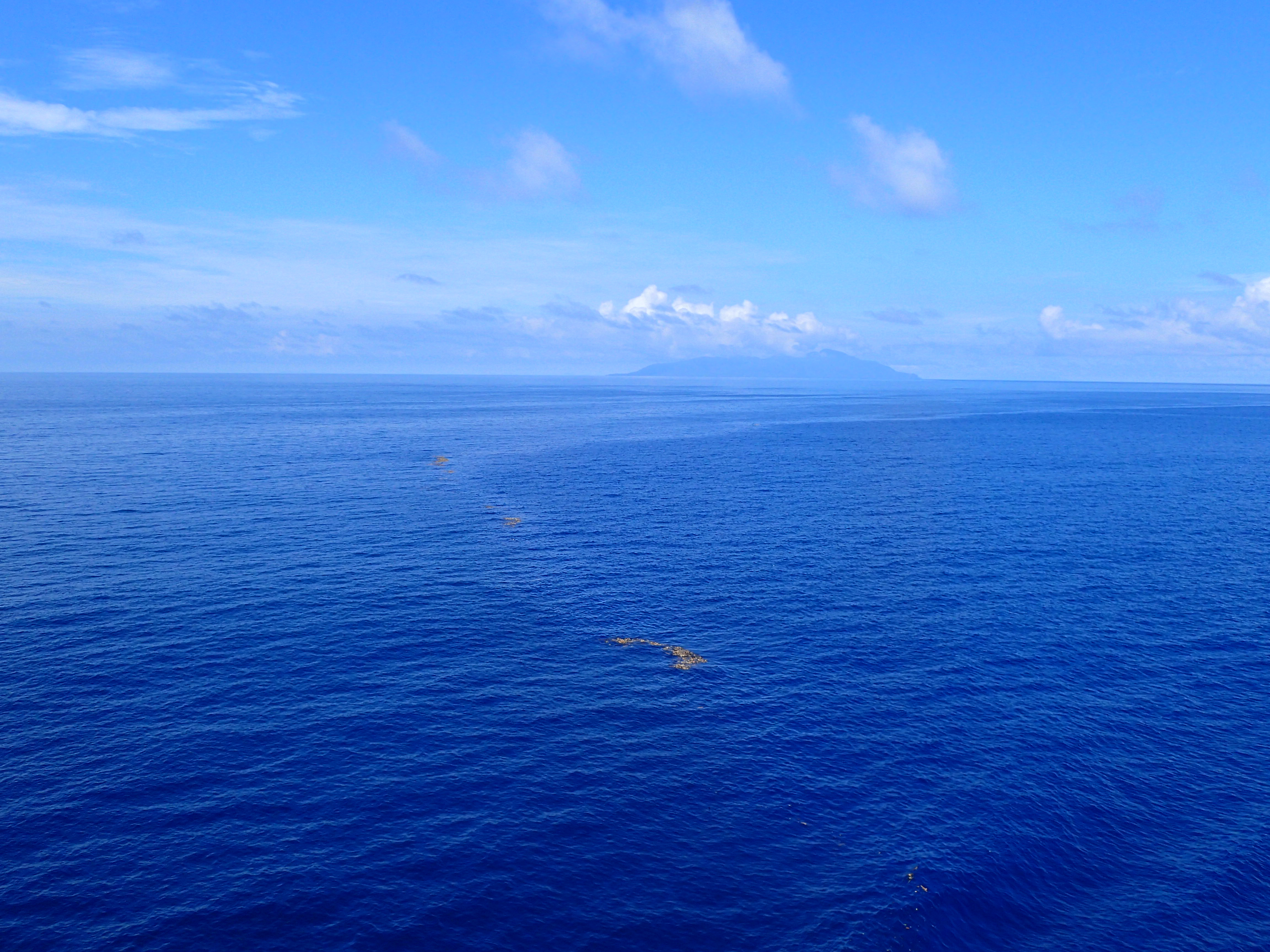
Fresh/Saline water interface in the sea 80 km (50 mi) from the Sepik River mouth

== Description ==
The river originates in the Victor Emanuel Range in the central highlands of Papua New Guinea. From its mountain headwaters near Telefomin, it travels north-west and leaves the mountains abruptly near Yapsei. From there it flows into Indonesian Papua, before turning back north-east, for the majority of its journey following the great Central Depression. Along its course it receives numerous tributaries from the Bewani and Torricelli Mountains to the north and the Central Range to the south, including the Yuat River formed by the Lai and the Jimmi.

For most of the Sepik's length, the river winds in serpentine fashion, like the Amazon, to the Bismarck Sea off northern Papua New Guinea. Unlike many other large rivers, the Sepik has no delta whatsoever, but flows straight into the sea, about 100 km (62 mi) east of the town of Wewak. It is navigable for most of its length.

== Hydrology ==
The river has a total length of over 1,100 km (680 mi) and has a drainage basin of over 80,000 km^{2} (31,000 mi^{2}). Its meandering bed is 250–500 m (820–1,640 ft) wide and averages 8–14 m (26–46 ft) deep. There is a 5-to-10-kilometre-wide (3.1 to 6.2 mi) belt of active meanders along most of its course, that has created a floodplain up to 70 kilometres (43 mi) wide, with extensive backwater swamps. There are around 1,500 oxbow and other lakes in the floodplain, the largest of which are the Chambri Lakes. Its annual sediment load is estimated at 115 million tonnes.

The Sepik basin is largely an undisturbed environment, with no major urban settlements, or mining and forestry activities, in the river catchment. April Salome Forest Management Area is located in Sepik River basin.

Its catchment is classified as type Af (tropical rainforest) according to Köppen climate classification, with a rainfall of 3,390 mm.

== Discharge ==
Sepik River at gauged stations
Year, period	Min (m^{3}/s)	Mean (m^{3}/s)	Max (m^{3}/s)	Ref.
Estuary 3°50′33.1404″S 144°32′35.4156″E
1979—2015		4,565		
1979/1980		7,000		
1972/1973	4,363	7,663	10,963	
		4,800		
Angoram 4°3′45.7308″S 144°4′29.1″E
1968—1980		5,000		
Ambunti 4°13′8.0976″S 142°49′32.5308″E
1980—1984	2,836.75	4,208	4,598.75	
1978—1987		3,099.7		
1970—1992	934.7	3,643.5	8,938.8	
1966—1997	2,600	3,664	4,730	
1966—1994	1,702	3,615	5,448^{*}	
1963/1964	3,398	5,316	7,038	
Kubkain 4°18′42.9264″S 142°19′43.1508″E
1994—1999, 2008—2015	1,274.3	3,338.7	6,022	
Iniok 4°17′17.6676″S 142°1′4.0944″E
1994—1999, 2008—2015	707.1	2,367.9	4,524.1	
May River 4°15′15.1344″S 141°53′42.7488″E
1994—1999, 2008—2015	514.7	1,559.4	3,047.8	
Green River 3°56′7.4364″S 141°16′23.34″E
1971—2000		1,119.4		
1970—1993	436	1,297	3,573	
1969—1996	841	1,191	1,550	
1963/1964	2,117	2,505	3,144	
Telefomin 5°10′5.7432″S 141°36′54.9432″E
1975—1994	40	54.4	66.8	
1970—1993	15	51	1,576	
1963/1964	235	636	1,538	

^{*}1969/1970 water year 8,964 m^{3}/s.

Sepik River discharge (m^{3}/s) at Ambunti station (period from 1963—1994):
Water year	Min	Mean	Max	Water year	Min	Mean	Max
1963/64	3,398	5,316	7,038	1979/80	2,009	4,080	5,509
1964/65				1980/81	1,632	3,850	5,602
1965/66				1981/82	1,142	3,310	5,465
1966/67	2,429	3,390	4,331	1982/83	1,509	4,060	5,999
1967/68	1,242	3,080	4,883	1983/84	1,828	3,360	4,703
1968/69	1,821	3,740	5,606	1984/85	2,111	3,680	5,232
1969/70	2,696	4,950	8,964	1985/86	999	3,190	4,808
1970/71	1,822	3,040	4,240	1986/87	932	3,080	5,502
1971/72	1,074	3,320	4,757	1987/88	2,736	3,880	5,008
1972/73	2,326	4,540	7,081	1988/89	1,448	3,790	6,203
1973/74	1,082	3,010	4,893	1989/90	1,907	3,870	5,809
1974/75	1,452	3,730	5,989	1990/91	1,482	3,210	4,926
1975/76	1,183	3,220	5,164	1991/92	1,747	3,350	4,938
1976/77	2,205	4,030	5,622	1992/93	1,320	3,180	5,017
1977/78	1,538	3,830	5,636	1993/94	2,825	4,020	5,061
1978/79	1,153	3,450	5,606				

== Tributaries ==
The main tributaries from the mouth:
Left tributary	Right tributary	Length (km)	Basin size (km^{2})	Average discharge (m^{3}/s)
Sepik		1,126	80,386.2	5,000
Lower Sepik
	Bien	103	1,344.8	67.7
Middle Sepik
	Keram	335	5,598.7	306.9
Nagam		195	1,757.2	41.9
	Yuat	373.4	11,952.5	625.4
Pasik			655.1	15.1
	Karawari	209	7,565.9	376.3
Hambili		132	1,036.7	31.1
Atilem		84	954.6	23.1
Kwatit (Parchee)		112	611.3	15
Upper Sepik
Screw		191	3,204.3	87.8
	Black River—Huastein	94	917	64.4
Sanchi		105	1,468.3	77.4
Namblo		122	663.4	36.5
Wagasu			1,068.8	59.4
	April	152	2,552.2	226.8
	Wagamush	74	964.7	81.6
	Wario		1,893.6	279.9
Nopan			992.5	60.1
	Frieda	120	1,466	271.9
	Seniap	42	538.9	57.7
	May	180	3,301.4	405.5
Wanibe Creek			1,618.4	98
Yula			479.5	31.4
Yellow		131	1,769.8	111.2
North		115	1,995.8	123.7
Horden		165	2,103.1	124.1
Fanngi (Green River)		61	750.8	41.4
	Idam	65	440.4	35.2
Hauser		60	1,149.3	74.1
	August (Yapsiei)	109	1,838	208.5
October		129	604.3	44.5
West			529.4	46.8
Raadsel			269	39.7
Hollander			269.4	40.4
Oklip		54	1,042	193.4
Brucken			465.8	76.4
Iugum (Casuarina)			201.4	32
	Hak (East)	43	464.3	54.7
	Elip (Donner)		227.6	26.6
Iram			388.7	64.9
Nong			176.6	23.8

== Peoples and languages ==
From the headwaters to the mouth, the river basin flows through the territories of spoken of dozens of Sepik languages, each corresponding to one or more culture regions of related villages that exhibit similar social characteristics. The largest language and culture group along the river is the Iatmul people.

The Sepik-Ramu basin is home to the Torricelli, Sepik, Lower Sepik-Ramu, Kwomtari, Leonhard Schultze, Upper Yuat, Yuat, Left May, and Amto-Musan language families, while local language isolates are Busa, Taiap, and Yadë. Torricelli, Sepik, and Lower Sepik-Ramu are by far the three most internally diverse language families of the region.

== History ==
Local villagers have lived along the river for many millennia and the river has formed the basis for food, transport and culture. There are at least 100 distinct villages and hamlets along the river, and most likely more.

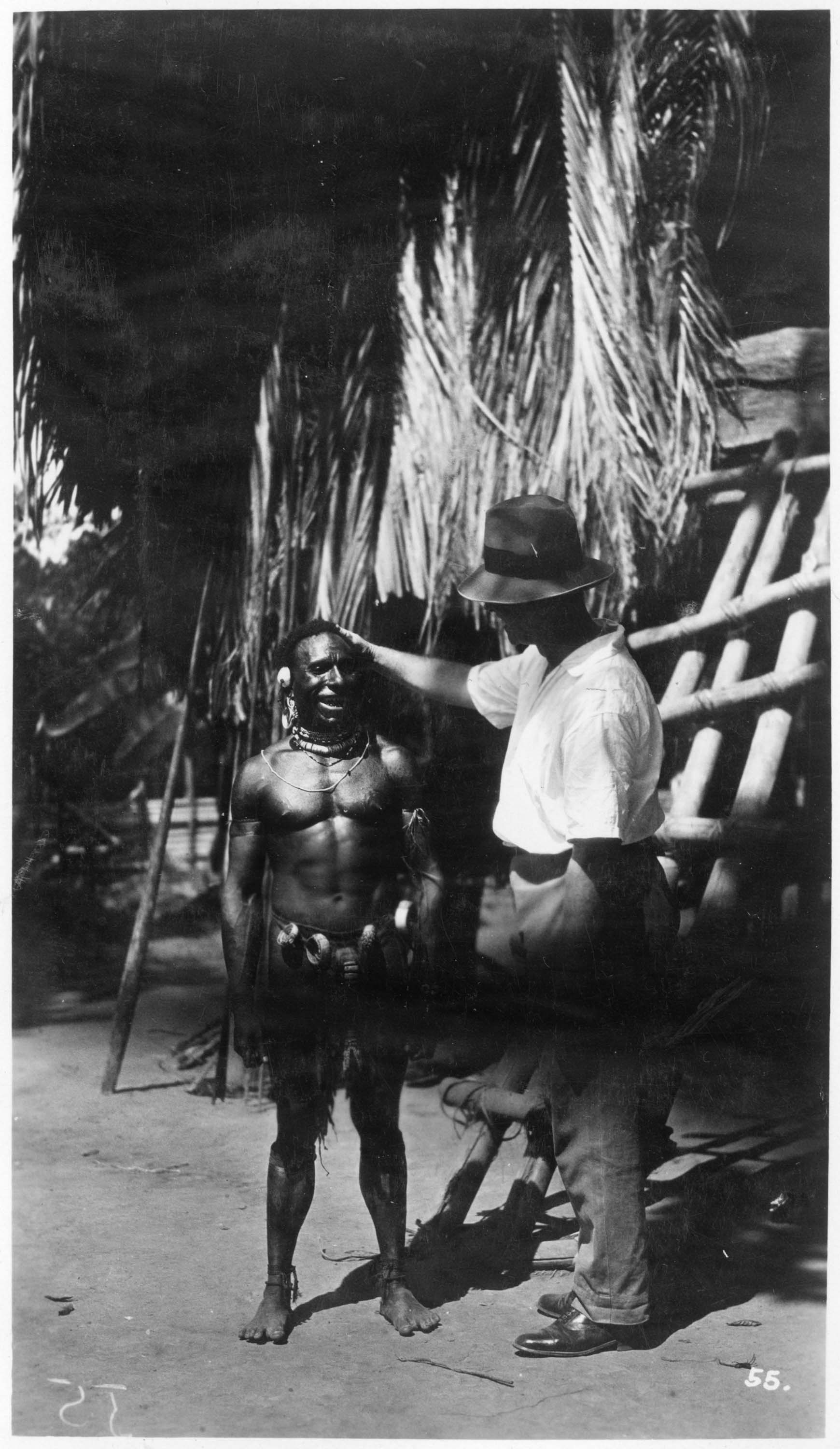
Australian anthropologist Ernest Chinnery, at work in the middle Sepik

=== Early exploration ===
European contact with the river started in 1885, shortly after Germany established colonial control over German New Guinea or Kaiser Wilhelmsland. The river was named by Otto Finsch, Kaiserin Augusta, after the German Empress Augusta. The colony was initially managed by the German New Guinea Company (Neuguinea-Kompagnie). Finsch, in the ship Samoa, entered only the estuary. He returned a year later, and the Samoa launched a smaller vessel that navigated about 50 kilometres (31 mi) upstream from its mouth. For the most part, German interest in the river was mainly to explore its economic potential, to collect artifacts, and to recruit native laborers to work on coastal and island copra plantations.

In 1886 and 1887, further expeditions by steam boat were conducted by the Germans and over 600 kilometres (370 mi) were explored. In 1887, the Samoa returned with another scientific expedition as well as a dozen Malays, eight men from the island of New Britain, and two members of the Rhenish Missionary Society. In the 1890s, missionaries from the Society of the Divine Word or SVD begin to proselytize along the river.

Europeans now increased their travels and presence along the river. In the early twentieth century, several major expeditions to the river include the Südsee-Expedition sponsored by the Hamburg Academic of Science, the German-Dutch Border Expedition and the Kaiserin-Augusta-Fluss-Expedition These expeditions, mainly German, collected flora and fauna, studied local tribes, and produced the first maps. The station town of Angoram was established in 1913 as a base on the lower Sepik for explorations, but with the beginning of World War I, the explorations ceased.

After the first World War the Australian government took trusteeship of the German colony, creating the Territory of New Guinea, and the Sepik region came under their jurisdiction. During this period the Australians established a station on the middle Sepik at Ambunti to conduct further explorations.

In 1923 journalist Beatrice Grimshaw attached herself to an expedition, and claimed to be the first white woman to ascent the Sepik, commenting on the widespread use of "pidgen-English" as a lingua franca. In 1935 Sir Walter McNicoll, the new administrator of the Territory of New Guinea, travelled up length of the Sepik to "have a look at the river people and the kind of country along the banks".

=== Modern 'explorers' ===
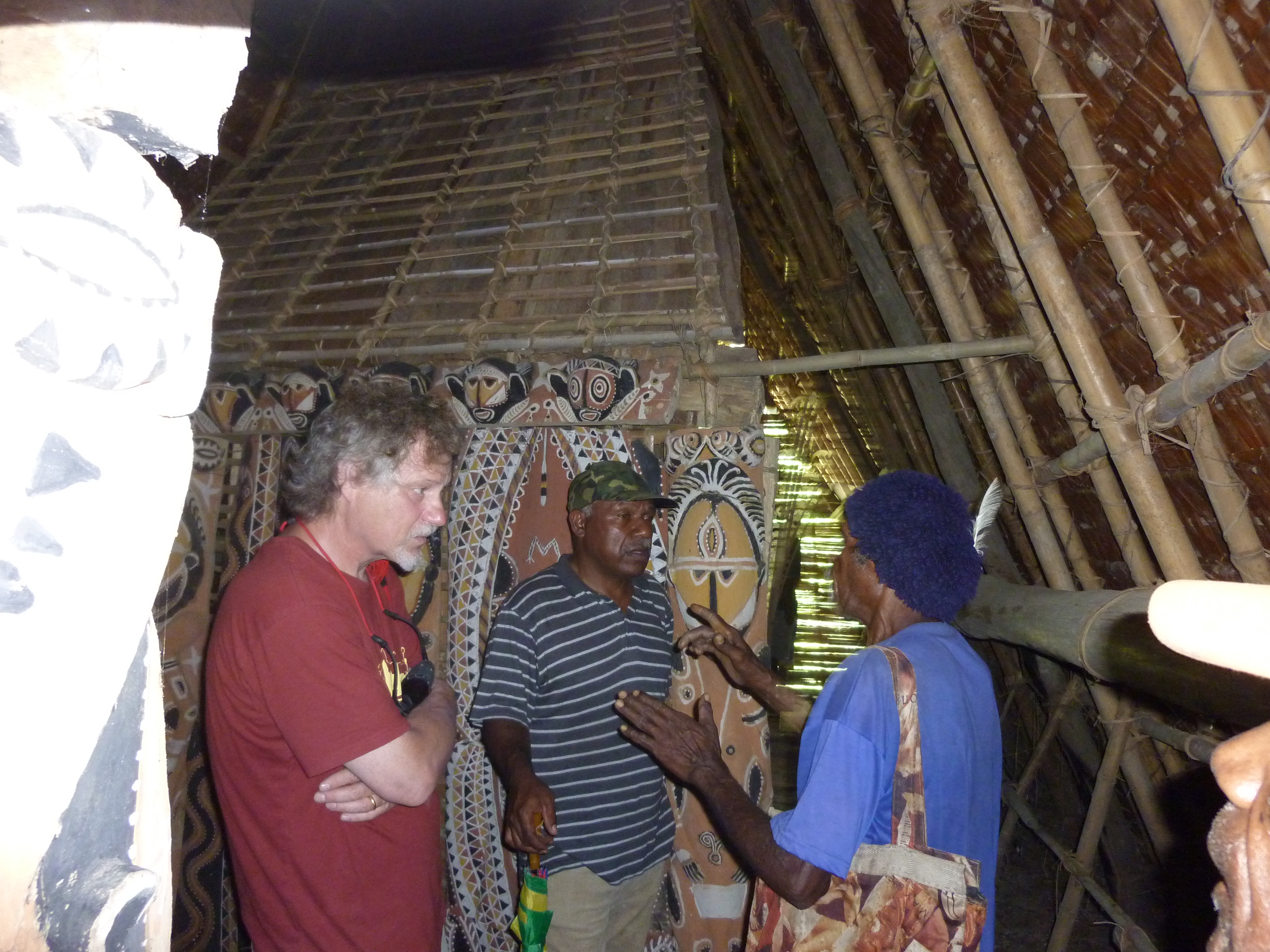
East Sepik area, Maprik District, in a Haus Tambaran, Ingo Kühl, Tomulopa Deko and indigenous men, 2012

Despite the thorough exploration of the Sepik and the river basin by Europeans starting with the 1880s, and the extraordinarily keen knowledge of the region by local people and communities, many travelers today still see their tourism in the area as heroic efforts.

Part of this fantasy is that the river tribes are often said to have "little contact with the modern world," as the Los Angeles Times put it as late as 2017. But that is just not true, and certainly not for a sizable tourist vessel operated by Coral Expeditions. Traveling the river is said to be "one of the last great adventures on earth".

For example, in 2010 Clark Carter and Andrew Johnson traveled the length of the Sepik River from source to sea. They hiked to the source from Telefomin and kayaked down the upper reaches in an inflatable kayak. After nearly drowning in a section of rapids near Telefomin, they decided to walk through the jungle, following the river until it was calm enough to take a dugout canoe the remaining 900 kilometres (560 mi) to the Bismarck Sea. The expedition took six weeks. "The Sepik really appealed to me," said Carter, "because it conjures up images of remote tribes and wild animals. Probably the most alluring thing for me though, is just how un-travelled the area is."

Also in 2010, the painter Ingo Kühl, accompanied by the local artist Tomulopa Deko, traveled from Goroka via Madang, Wewak and Maprik to Pagwi and from there on the Sepik upriver to Ambunti and to the villages of Maliwai, Yambon and Yessan. He described his experiences in an illustrated book. In 2012 he repeated this expedition together with his wife and Tom Deko. They reached the settlements of Oum Number 1 and Oum Number 2 and the April River, a tributary of the Sepik.

=== World War II ===
The Japanese held the area throughout most of the Second World War. By the end of the war, though, the Japanese had been completely surrounded after Hollandia and Aitape in Netherlands New Guinea were captured by Allied forces in April 1944 during Operations Reckless and Persecution. The Aitape-Wewak campaign, the battle to defeat the remaining forces by the Australian Army, was hard-fought and drawn out due to the terrain, lasting until the end of the war in August 1945.

The Australians eventually pushed the Japanese back to the village of Timbunke on the middle Sepik in July 1945. After an Australian RAAF plane landed 10 kilometres (6 mi) from Timbunke the Japanese suspected that the villagers had collaborated with the Australians and proceeded to massacre 100 of the villagers.

== Artwork ==
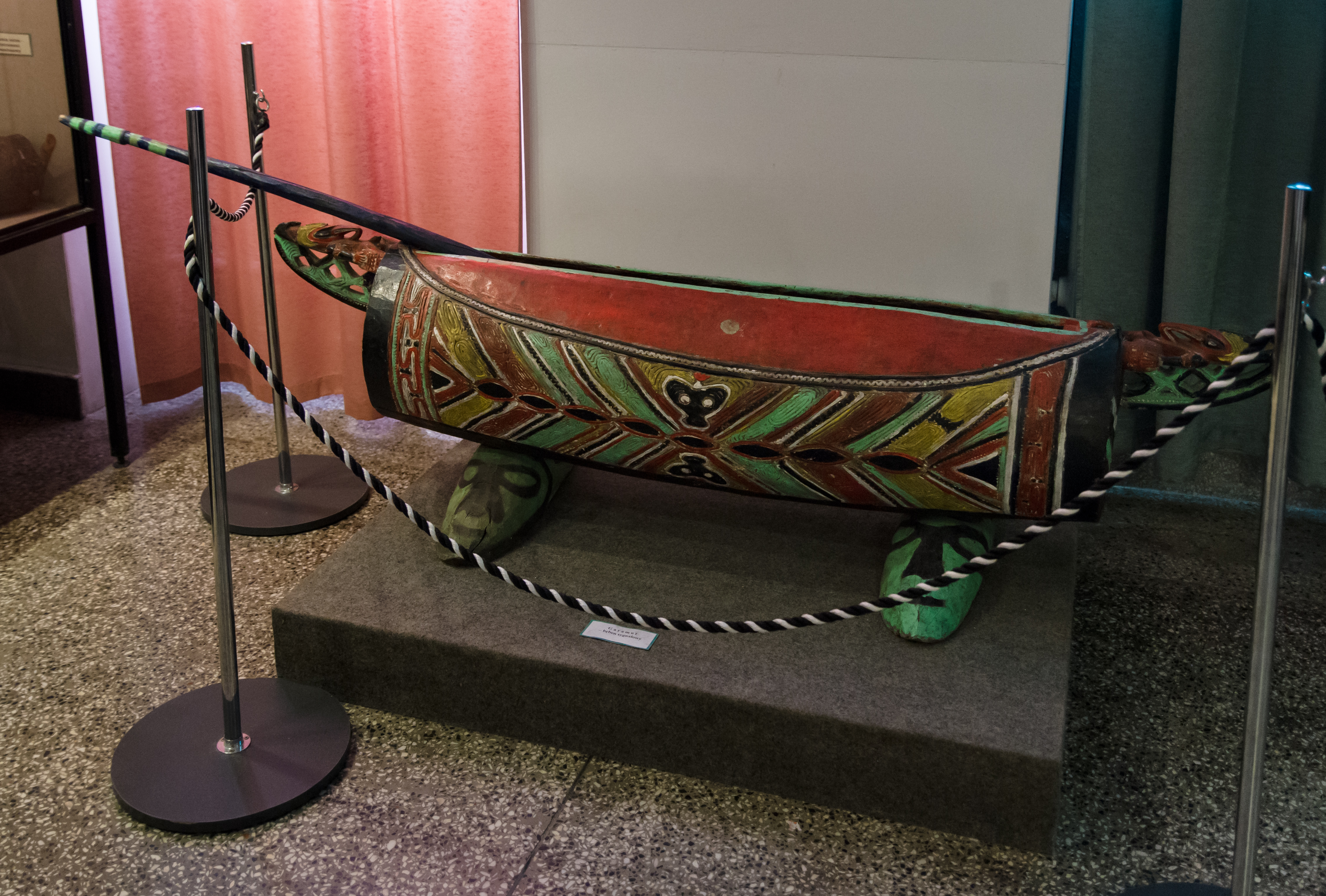
Garamut ritual drum

The Sepik is one of the most profuse and diverse art-producing regions of the world. The numerous different tribes living along the river produce magnificent wood carvings, clay pottery and other art and craft. Different areas along the Sepik produce distinct art styles so an experienced curator will be able to visually distinguish individual styles. The Sepik area is well known for its sculptures, masks, shields and other artifacts. Many tribes use garamut drums in rituals; the drums are formed from long hollowed-out tree trunks carved into the shape of various totem animals.

== Gallery ==
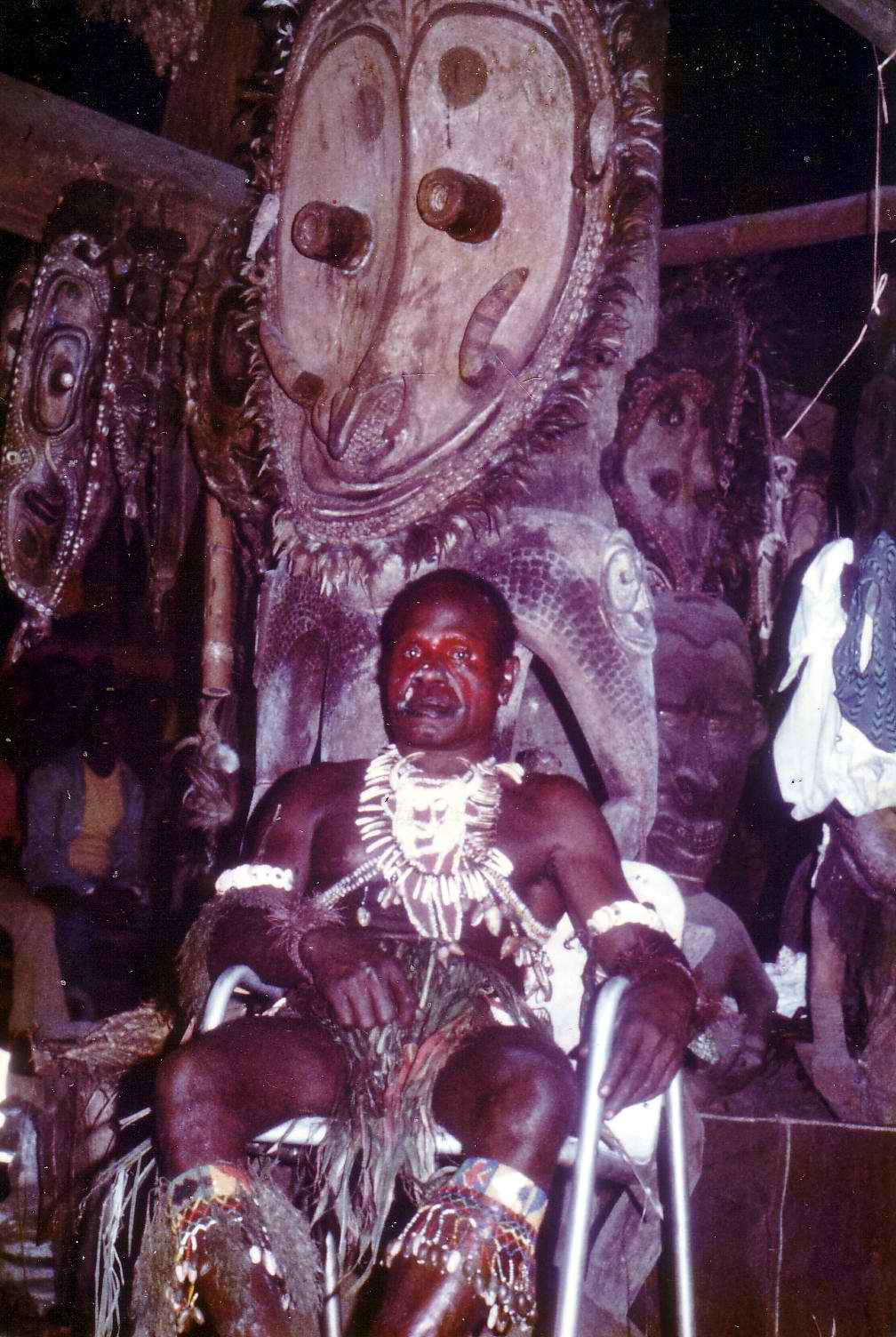
Korogo Village, Sepik River, PNG, 1975. Franz Luthi

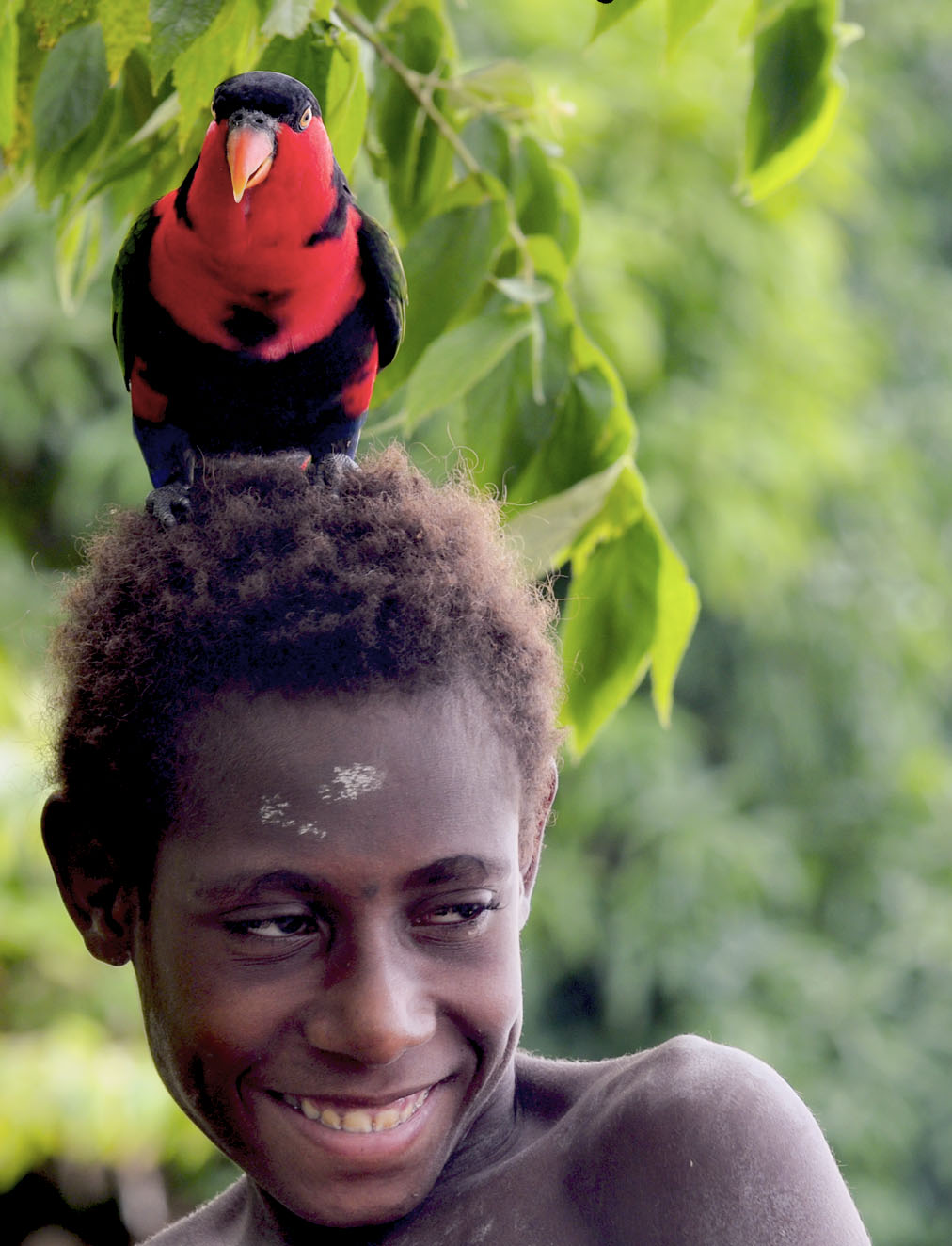
A black-capped lory perching on a boy's head at Kaminabit village, Middle Sepik

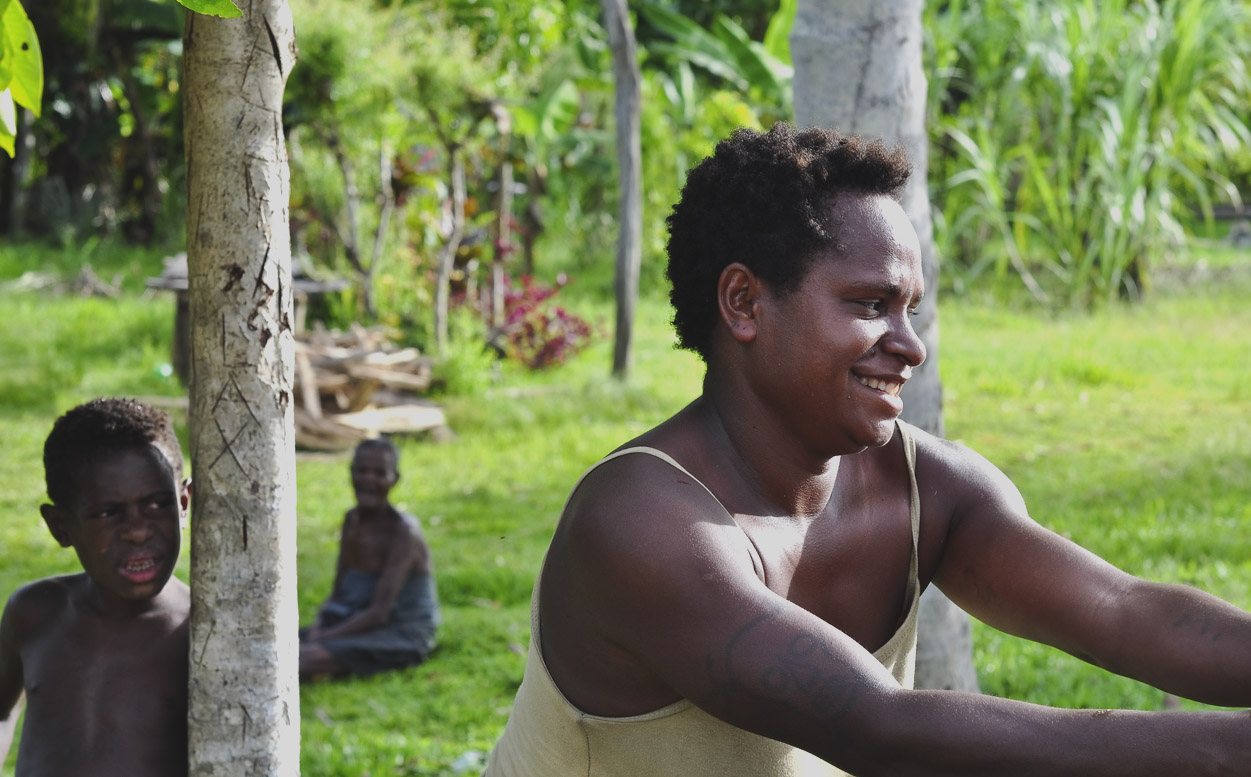
A warm welcome to foreign visitors

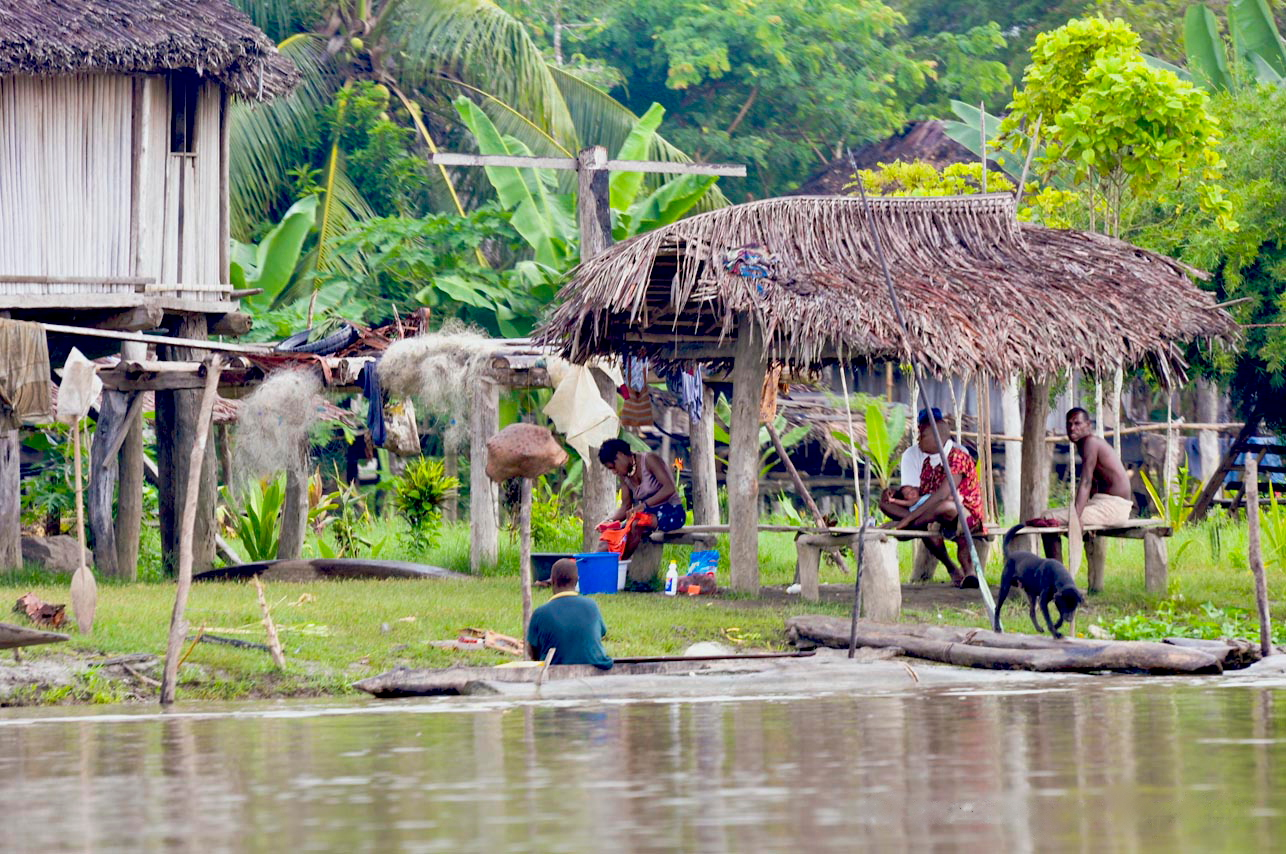
Snapshot of the daily life of the villagers

== See also ==
- List of rivers of Oceania
- List of rivers of Papua New Guinea
- List of rivers of Indonesia
- List of rivers by discharge
