= List of rivers of Papua New Guinea =

This is a list of rivers of Papua New Guinea.

== In alphabetical order ==
- Abede River
- Afai River
- Ajova River
- Arafundi River
- Arai River
- Aramia River
- Aroa River (Papua New Guinea)
- Asaro River
- Atara River
- Ateltem River
- Atob River
- Awung River
- Bae'e River
- Bamu River
- Bapi River
- Bensbach River
- Bigei River
- Birim River (New Guinea)
- Bitoi River
- Bumi River
- Busu River
- Bulolo River
- Chimbu River
- Dimir River
- Elevala River
- Evapia River
- Fly River
- Frieda River
- Gama River
- Genga River
- Gilagil River
- Girua River
- Gogol River
- Guabe River
- Guam River
- Guga River (Papua New Guinea)
- Gum River
- Hongorai River
- Jaba River
- Jimi River
- Kabenau River
- Kaugel River
- Kaukombar River
- Keram River
- Kikori River
- Kokun River
- Kumil River
- Kumusi River
- Lamari River
- Leonard Schultze River
- Malas River
- Mambare River
- Mape River
- Markham River
- Masaweng River
- Mindjim River
- Moam River
- Morehead River
- Musa River
- Numagen River
- Nuru River
- Ogon River
- Ok Tedi River
- Omati River
- Omosa River
- Oriomo River
- Pahoturi River
- Piore River
- Piva River, Bougainville
- Purari River
- Ramu
- Samaia River
- Segero Creek
- Senu River
- Sepik
- Siki River
- Sogeram River
- Song River
- Strickland River
- Tabali River
- Timper River
- Tomul River
- Torokina River
- Tua River (Papua New Guinea)
- Turama River
- Vanapa River
- Veimauri River
- Waghi River
- Wanang River
- Waria River
- Wassi Kussa River
- Watut River
- Wawoi River
- Yaganon River
- Yellow River (Papua New Guinea)
- Yuat River

=== New Britain ===
- Aemoi River
- Apmi River
- Balima River (Papua New Guinea)
- Johanna River (New Britain)
- Warangoi River

=== New Ireland ===
- Aparam River
- Lossuk River
- Lumis River

=== Madang Province ===
The following are rivers in Madang Province for which various Madang language subgroups are named after.

- Dimir River
- Malas River
- Kaukombar River
- Kumil River
- Numagen River
- Omosa River
- Kokun River
- Gum River
- Awung River
- Evapia River
- Nuru River
- Kabenau River
- Tomul River
- Sogeram River
- Wanang River
- Yaganon River

== List of major rivers by basin ==
List of Papua New Guinea's largest primary rivers, in order of catchment area.

River	Mouth coordinates	Basin size		Average discharge		Length	
River	Mouth coordinates	km^{2}	sq mi	m^{3}/s	cu ft/s	km	mi
Arafura Sea
Morehead	9°8′19.6764″S 141°20′31.47″E	3,555.8	1,372.9	99	3,500	217	135
Bensbach	9°7′41.5632″S 141°1′11.2332″E	2,516.7	971.7	92.4	3,260	242	150
Mai Kussa	9°8′30.1848″S 142°12′11.25″E	2,244.5	866.6	55.9	1,970	65	40
Wassi Kussa	9°10′4.818″S 142°3′0.4788″E	1,551.7	599.1	48.5	1,710	76	47
Bismarck Sea
Sepik	3°50′21.622″S 144°32′32.979″E	80,386.2	31,037.3	5,000	180,000	1,126	700
Ramu	4°1′3.675″S 144°40′0.053″E	17,822.6	6,881.3	990	35,000	640	400
Gogol	5°19′17.766″S 145°45′17.434″E	2,086	805	142.7	5,040	165	103
Kapiura	5°32′13.9884″S 150°39′32.2992″E	1,867.7	721.1	182.7	6,450	120	75
Via	5°31′40.4292″S 149°30′47.97″E	1,110	430	90.6	3,200	85	53
Pandi	4°56′6.5364″S 151°26′38.1732″E	1,085.3	419.0	163.5	5,770	75	47
Urawa	5°50′12.891″S 146°49′58.229″E	1,030.5	397.9	38.6	1,360	67	42
Aria	5°34′26.094″S 149°15′54.8748″E	1,012.2	390.8	76.7	2,710	90	56
Toriu	4°42′44.4816″S 151°39′22.0536″E	806.2	311.3	56.3	1,990	72	45
Kulu	5°29′33.5652″S 149°54′20.2896″E	769.8	297.2	69.6	2,460	96	60
Kwama	5°54′59.988″S 147°16′11.850″E	574.9	222.0	37.3	1,320		
Nankina	5°36′23.410″S 146°27′42.251″E	550.9	212.7	31.6	1,120		
Timbe	5°55′58.930″S 147°4′22.670″E	459.9	177.6	26.9	950	50	31
Malas	4°22′54.258″S 145°16′14.413″E	393.2	151.8	24.5	870		
Gilagil	4°43′30.862″S 145°39′18.816″E	364.5	140.7	24	850	39	24
Korindindi	4°55′13.6452″S 151°39′14.58″E	344.9	133.2	37.6	1,330		
Toiru	5°23′25.8576″S 150°59′33.9504″E	313.7	121.1	43.1	1,520	30	19
Balima	5°8′33.2376″S 151°5′17.7144″E	313.6	121.1	44.2	1,560	33.5	20.8
Kapuluk	5°31′36.4728″S 149°44′37.7088″E	309.1	119.3	26.4	930	51	32
Gavuvu	5°28′12.198″S 150°23′26.4912″E	291.6	112.6	30.1	1,060		
Wari	2°12′6.6898″S 147°4′6.4776″E	217.1	83.8	11.8	420	35.5	22.1
Yamule	5°26′12.1812″S 150°57′32.8356″E	201.4	77.8	24.9	880		
Lobu	5°12′28.5084″S 151°3′10.7208″E	180.2	69.6	24.2	850	30	19
Coral Sea
Fly	8°35′24.4824″S 143°36′39.024″E	73,809.31	28,497.93	6,500	230,000	1,060	660
Purari	7°50′57.9624″S 145°2′54.8196″E	33,517.8	12,941.3	3,000	110,000	630	390
Bamu	8°4′1.7796″S 143°42′37.2888″E	19,346.5	7,469.7	1,113.6	39,330	390	240
Kikori	7°42′29.664″S 144°29′41.7624″E	18,863.3	7,283.2	2,000	71,000	445	277
Turama	7°51′52.166″S 144°0′41.5296″E	5,879.4	2,270.0	511.7	18,070	302	188
Vailala	7°56′43.1448″S 145°24′31.6476″E	5,726.6	2,211.1	254.8	9,000	241	150
Lakekamu	8°13′16.1328″S 146°9′30.6936″E	5,385	2,079	195	6,900	198	123
Vanapa	9°7′18.1596″S 146°55′1.2396″E	5,358	2,069	243	8,600	130	81
Tauri	8°7′22.5084″S 146°4′37.6932″E	4,263.9	1,646.3	260	9,200	250	160
Kempwelch	10°3′18.6012″S 147°46′30.5328″E	3,036.2	1,172.3	111.7	3,940	165	103
Alabule	8°42′0.0252″S 146°29′34.908″E	2,700.3	1,042.6	119.4	4,220		
Gami	8°0′3.6216″S 143°52′49.3896″E	2,449.6	945.8	215.9	7,620	160	99
Aroa	9°3′51.9408″S 146°48′3.8232″E	2,197.5	848.5	77.7	2,740	80	50
Era	7°31′47.262″S 144°42′10.5912″E	2,115.6	816.8	136.4	4,820	243	151
Akaifu	8°21′6.0228″S 146°16′2.2512″E	1,869.1	721.7	58.1	2,050	70	43
Ormond	10°4′46.4124″S 148°10′4.5624″E	1,660.4	641.1	41.5	1,470		
Bonua	10°14′4.7508″S 149°5′13.3116″E	1,654.7	638.9	63.7	2,250		
Omati	7°44′31.2396″S 144°11′14.0676″E	1,616.9	624.3	176.5	6,230	146	91
Pahoturi	9°16′26.4972″S 142°44′32.3664″E	1,431.5	552.7	28.8	1,020	80	50
Oriomo	9°2′9.9924″S 143°10′54.426″E	1,250.3	482.7	48.8	1,720	74	46
Bailebu	10°18′3.1716″S 149°16′34.6944″E	1,100.7	425.0	38.3	1,350		
Mori	10°10′17.1516″S 148°33′56.3688″E	894	345	33.1	1,170	60	37
Kapuri	8°14′47.2068″S 146°11′43.0188″E	872	337	29.8	1,050		
Pie	7°40′7.8996″S 144°50′31.3188″E	689.7	266.3	46.9	1,660	73	45
Binaturi	9°8′24.1764″S 142°57′18.3888″E	540.7	208.8	15.3	540	48	30
Sagarai	10°26′35.8368″S 150°6′0.1044″E	456.2	176.1	19	670		
Murua	7°54′18.7272″S 145°48′45.4896″E	371.5	143.4	19.5	690		
Wai'i	7°27′21.8736″S 144°42′12.2136″E	355.6	137.3	30.2	1,070		
Pacific Ocean
Pual	2°44′5.502″S 141°26′35.429″E	2,682.1	1,035.6	85.2	3,010	88	55
Bliri	2°57′43.120″S 141°59′12.615″E	1,473.3	568.8	49.6	1,750	82	51
Laluai	6°30′0.0756″S 155°54′48.9672″E	511.7	197.6	34.7	1,230	65	40
Solomon Sea
Markham	6°44′44.473″S 146°58′12.987″E	12,712	4,908	385	13,600	180	110
Musa	9°4′27.7752″S 148°53′1.0644″E	6,029	2,328	262	9,300	260	160
Waria	7°49′21.608″S 147°40′52.370″E	3,920.2	1,513.6	219.8	7,760	200	120
Mambare	8°3′9.822″S 148°0′26.271″E	3,509.1	1,354.9	265.9	9,390	220	140
Kumusi	8°28′47.285″S 148°13′38.445″E	2,726.7	1,052.8	188.4	6,650	167	104
Mongi	6°42′40.883″S 147°35′59.376″E	1,649.1	636.7	92.7	3,270	73	45
Gira	8°0′8.001″S 147°57′27.047″E	1,379.7	532.7	96.5	3,410	110	68
Busu	6°43′44″S 147°03′05″E	1,311.32	506.30	50	1,800	75	47
Ruaba	9°48′5.9724″S 149°44′4.704″E	1,107.1	427.5	32.1	1,130		
Bariji	9°5′9.8052″S 148°38′15.4428″E	1,034.9	399.6	47.9	1,690		
Mevelo	4°58′21.4932″S 151°58′41.8116″E	936.8	361.7	77.3	2,730	67	42
Esis	5°30′42.5628″S 151°40′10.3944″E	911.8	352.0	129.6	4,580	50	31
Warangoi	4°30′38.1996″S 152°20′7.1556″E	882.9	340.9	26.5	940	60	37
Ania	6°1′17.1156″S 150°47′48.5376″E	862	333	88	3,100	50	31
Johanna	6°17′1.2048″S 150°0′25.3296″E	818.3	315.9	80.1	2,830		
Bitoi	7°12′46.106″S 147°8′11.866″E	762.2	294.3	20.6	730	53	33
Paiawa	7°32′12.660″S 147°22′40.907″E	727	281	30	1,100	74	46
Eia	7°56′17.556″S 147°48′11.395″E	723.1	279.2	48.9	1,730	91	57
Ope	8°18′30.651″S 148°12′21.352″E	713.3	275.4	51.5	1,820		
Pulie	6°5′10.3632″S 149°10′45.4188″E	697	269	44.8	1,580	100	62
Alimbit	6°8′22.9082″S 149°29′30.4548″E	658	254	52.4	1,850	35	22
Awio	6°14′30.7212″S 150°9′32.8932″E	626.7	242.0	69.7	2,460	58	36
Torlu	5°51′52.542″S 151°17′15.81″E	603.2	232.9	66	2,300	55	34
Yupuru	9°32′39.5592″S 149°22′43.716″E	522.2	201.6	21.7	770		
Jaba	6°23′51.7776″S 155°11′52.6056″E	515.6	199.1	44	1,600	50	31
Frisco	7°4′24.368″S 147°2′57.512″E	508.5	196.3	15.4	540		
Melkoi	5°57′51.012″S 151°6′39.1536″E	494.8	191.0	53.2	1,880	51	32
Itni	5°50′0.8016″S 148°33′18.1728″E	454.3	175.4	24.7	870	38	24
Mape	6°35′16.210″S 147°49′25.820″E	452.8	174.8	29.5	1,040	50	31
Andru	6°16′42.6936″S 149°48′25.416″E	447	173	38.2	1,350		
Girua	8°36′55.8252″S 148°18′57.3229″E	414.5	160.0	24.9	880		
Bergberg	5°30′48.0312″S 151°41′32.9712″E	404.4	156.1	57.6	2,030	74	46
Amgen	6°13′29.244″S 150°28′51.0672″E	390.6	150.8	46.4	1,640	65	40
Bairaman	5°45′48.1428″S 151°23′33.7236″E	364	141	41.9	1,480	66	41
Adi	5°56′42.7416″S 148°50′47.9652″E	361.8	139.7	18.8	660	65	40
Wunung	5°36′25.4232″S 151°27′35.4528″E	315.1	121.7	38.4	1,360	39	24
Kamdaru	4°11′58.3476″S 152°40′49.5588″E	287.5	111.0	14.7	520	33	21
Weitin	4°37′18.1956″S 153°1′42.5244″E	283.5	109.5	12.1	430	35	22
Pailima	6°17′6.9144″S 149°39′34.8984″E	268.7	103.7	22.1	780		
Galowe	5°31′17.3028″S 151°28′58.5696″E	214.8	82.9	30.3	1,070	31	19
Tigul	5°32′26.0088″S 151°51′52.3728″E	185.9	71.8	25.4	900		
Matali	5°31′10.1424″S 151°30′38.5092″E	173.9	67.1	24.2	850		

Surface waters of Papua New Guinea; Papua New Guinea (PNG), Indonesia (IND);

River	Basin size						Discharge					
River	PNG		IND		Total		PNG		IND		Total	
River	10^{3} km^{2}	10^{3} sq mi	10^{3} km^{2}	10^{3} sq mi	10^{3} km^{2}	10^{3} sq mi	km^{3} /year	cu mi /year	km^{3} /year	cu mi /year	km^{3} /year	cu mi /year
Fly	70.8	27.3	3	1.2	73.8	28.5	203.4	48.8	6.6	1.6	210	50
Kikori	18.9	7.3			18.9	7.3	63	15			63	24
Purari	33.5	12.9			33.5	12.9	95	23			95	23
Ramu	17.8	6.9			17.8	6.9	31	7.4			31	7.4
Sepik	77.4	29.9	3	1.2	80.4	31.0	142.3	34.1	17.7	4.2	160	38
Other	244.4	94.4			244.4	94.4	395.3	94.8			395.3	94.8

Region	Area		Discharge	
Region	10^{3} km^{2}	10^{3} sq mi	km^{3}/year	cu mi/year
New Guinea	406.24	156.85	801	192
Islands Region	56.6	21.9	129	31
Papua New Guinea	462.84	178.70	930	220

== See also ==
- List of rivers of Western New Guinea
- List of rivers of Oceania
- List of rivers of Indonesia
- Geography of Papua New Guinea
- List of rivers by discharge
