= List of rivers of Oceania =

This is a list of rivers in Oceania.

== Australia ==
- List of rivers of Australia

== Cook Islands ==
- Avana River

== Fiji ==
- Ba River
- Dreketi River
- Navua River
- Rewa River
- Sigatoka River

== French Polynesia ==
- Papenoo River

== New Zealand ==
- List of rivers of New Zealand

== Papua New Guinea ==
- Asaro River
- Bae'e River
- Chimbu River
- Eilanden River
- Fly River
- Gogol River
- Jaba River
- Kabenau River
- Kikori River
- Malas River
- Mambare River
- Markham River
- Ok Tedi River
- Pulau River
- Purari River
- Ramu River
- Sepik River
- Sogeram River
- Strickland River
- Torokina River
- Turama River
- Watut River
- Warangoi River
- Wawoi River

== Samoa ==
- List of rivers of Samoa

== Western New Guinea ==
- Digul
- Mamberamo River
- Tariku River
- Taritatu River
- Van Daalen River

== Rivers of Oceania by discharge ==
Largest primary rivers of Oceania by discharge:
River	Average discharge (m^{3}/s) at mouth
01 Fly	6,500
02 Mamberamo	5,500
03 Sepik	5,000
04 Digul	3,333
05 Eilanden	3,133
06 Purari	3,000
07 Kikori	2,000
08 Bamu	1,114
09 Ramu	990
10 Mitchell	727
11 Clutha	614
12 Waiau	520
13 Turama	512
14 Momats	492
15 Buller	488
16 Murray	459
17 Normanby	452
18 Wapoga	430
19 Waikato	417
20 Burdekin	394
21 Bian	392
22 Kamundan	387
23 Markham	385
24 Lorentz	380
25 Grey	378
26 Daly	376
27 Waitaki	376
39 Rewa (Fiji)	250

== See also ==
- Lists of rivers
- List of rivers of Europe
- List of rivers of Africa
- List of rivers of the Americas
- List of rivers of Asia
