= Musa River =

River in Papua New Guinea

Musa
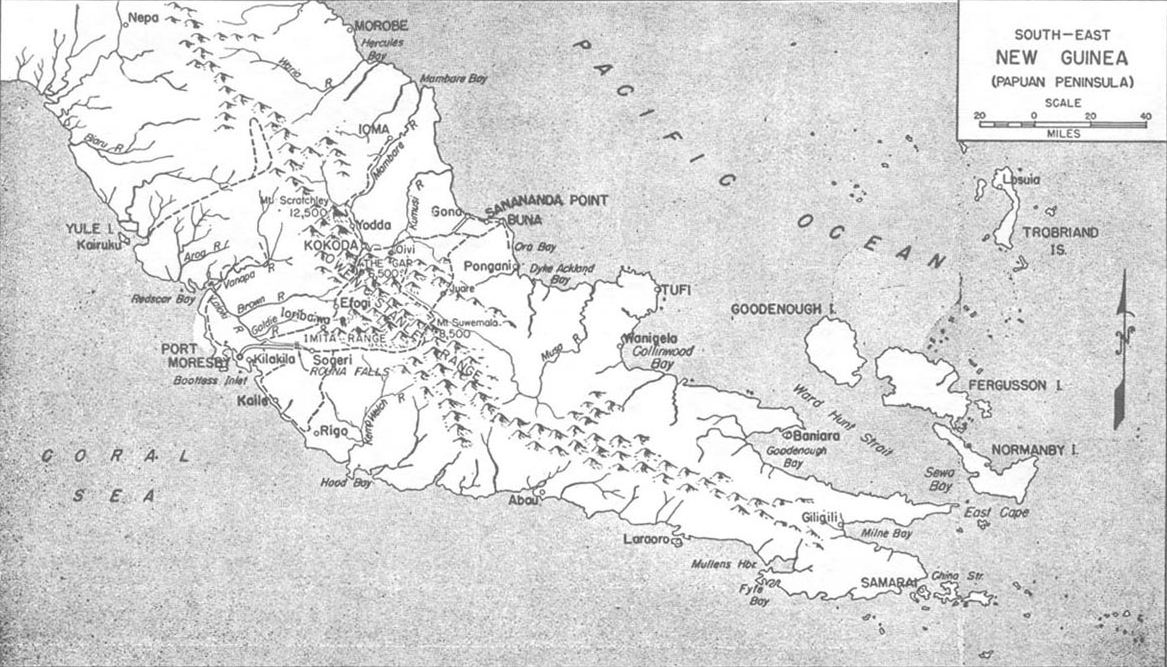
- The Musa River is on the east coast, south of the latitude of Port Morsby and just north of Cape Nelson.

Location
- Country: Papua New Guinea
- Region: Oro

Physical characteristics
- Source: Confluence of Moni and Awala rivers
  - location: Owen Stanley Range
  - coordinates: 9°30′27.2376″S 148°29′29.3424″E
  - elevation: 164 m (538 ft)
- 2nd source: Moni River
  - coordinates: 9°15′8.4312″S 148°2′45.0276″E
  - elevation: 2,203 m (7,228 ft)
- 3rd source: Awala River
  - coordinates: 9°19′21.4356″S 148°2′44.3904″E
  - elevation: 2,614 m (8,576 ft)
- Mouth: Dyke Ackland Bay (Solomon Sea)
  - coordinates: 9°4′27.7752″S 148°53′1.0644″E
  - elevation: 0 m (0 ft)
- Length: 140 km (87 mi)(Musa–Moni 250 km)
- Basin size: 6,178.6 km^{2} (2,385.6 sq mi)
- Discharge
  - location: Near mouth
  - average: 380 m^{3}/s (13,000 cu ft/s)

Basin features
- Progression: Dyke Ackland Bay (Solomon Sea)
- River system: Musa River
- Tributaries
  - left: Moni, Sisiworo, Foru
  - right: Awala, Ukuma, Adau, Totore

The Musa is a river on the eastern side of the Papuan Peninsula, in Papua New Guinea. It is one of the primary rivers on Oro Province. Its mouth exits into Dyke Ackland Bay.

A plan to dam the river in 1975 caused local opposition.

== Tributaries ==
The main tributaries from the mouth:

Left tributary	Right tributary	Length (km)	Basin size (km^{2})	Average discharge (m^{3}/s)
Musa		250	6,178.6	380
Foru			127.1	9.8
	Totore		215.4	15.3
	Adau		1,878.2	115.3
	Ukuma		282.9	16.5
Sisiworo			197.8	13.7
	Awala		986.8	47
Moni		110	1,175	82.9

== See also ==
- List of rivers of Papua New Guinea
- List of rivers of Oceania
