= Aroa River =

Aroa River may refer to:

- Aroa River (Venezuela)
- Aroa River (Papua New Guinea)

== See also ==
- Aroa (disambiguation)
