= Bamu River =

River in Papua New Guinea

Bamu River Gwavi River, Aworra River
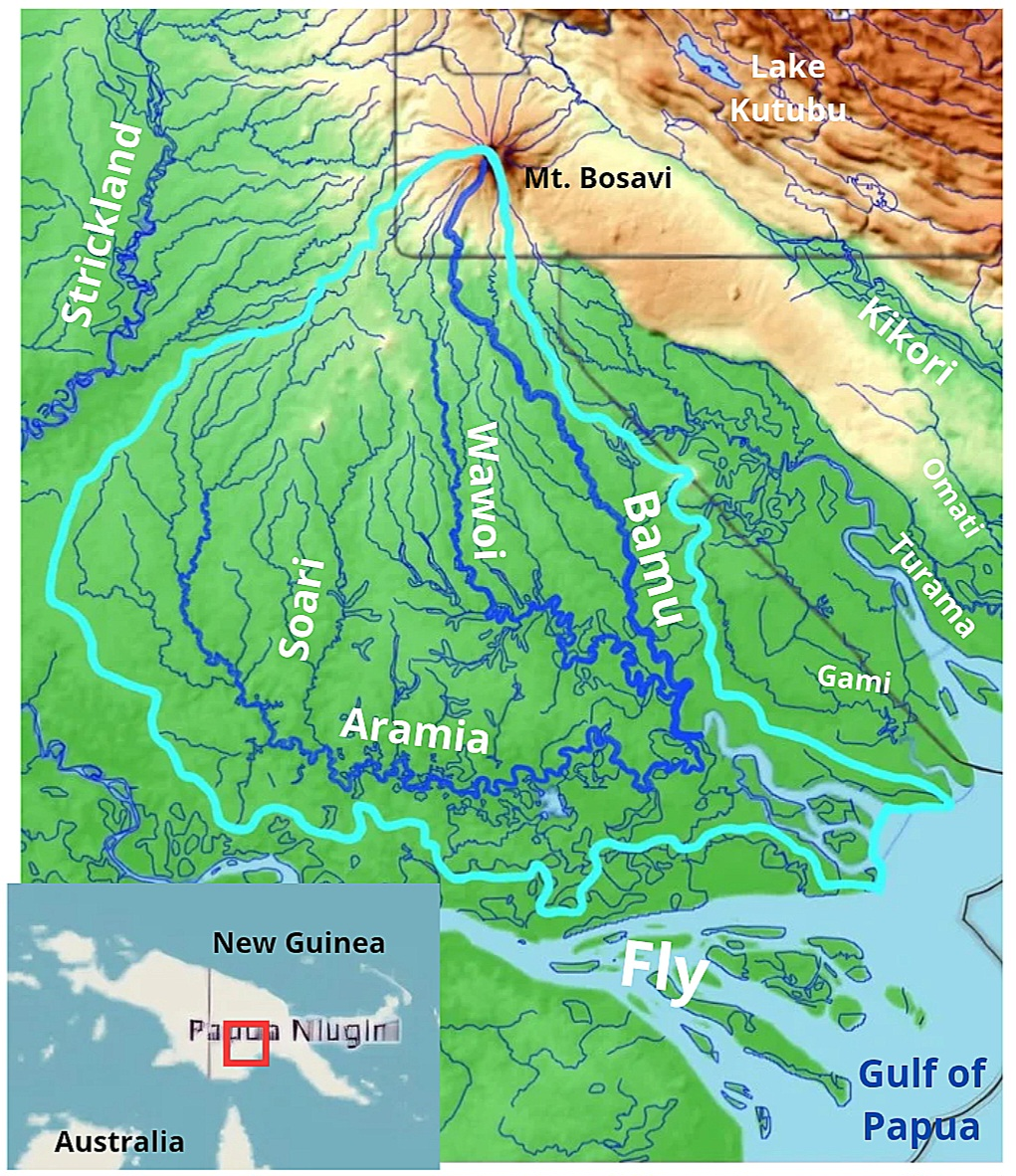
- Bamu River Basin

- Location within Papua New Guinea

Location
- Country: Papua New Guinea
- Region: Western Province

Physical characteristics
- Source
  - location: Great Papuan Plateau, Southern Highlands Province
  - coordinates: 6°38′51.666″S 142°49′12.432″E
  - elevation: 1,113 m (3,652 ft)
- Mouth: Gulf of Papua
  - location: Bamu Rural LLG
  - coordinates: 8°4′1.7796″S 143°42′37.2888″E
  - elevation: 0 m (0 ft)
- Length: 310 km (190 mi)
- Basin size: 19,346.5 km^{2} (7,469.7 mi^{2})
- Discharge
  - location: Near mouth
  - average: 2,000 m^{3}/s (71,000 cu ft/s)

Basin features
- Progression: Gulf of Papua
- River system: Bamu River
- Tributaries
  - left: Aworra
  - right: Kwobe, Demowi, Wawoi, Aramia, Dibiri

The Bamu River is a river in southwestern Papua New Guinea.

== Course ==
Large river in southwestern Papua New Guinea. Its headwaters originate in the southern part of the Mount Bosavi. It flows through the seasonally flooded, rainforested, swampy Papua Lowlands and empties into the Gulf of Papua after more than 300 km. It is also called the Aworra River up to the mouth of the Wawoi. Its estuary is a tidal delta widened into a funnel. The tidal range of the sea is about 50 km.

== Hydrology ==
The southern part of its catchment receives 2,500 mm of rainfall per year, reaching 4,500 mm in the north and east. This area is classified as type Af according to Köppen's climate classification. Average discharge in wet years is 2,000 m^{3}/s (71,000 cu ft/s).

== Tributaries ==
The largest tributaries of the Bamu:

Left tributary	Right tributary	Length (km)	Basin size (km^{2})	Average discharge (m^{3}/s)
Bamu		310	19,346.5	2,000
	Dibiri		151.1	17.6
	Aramia	463	10,715.8	977.4
	Wawoi	482	4,312.1	485.3
	Demowi		382.3	39.9
Aworra			188	31.1
	Kwobe		374.3	64.4

== Ecology ==
The river is home to fish species such as barramundi and catfish. The surrounding landscape is also home to a variety of fauna such as Rusa deer, wallabies, wild pigs, crocodiles and various lizards.

== See also ==
- List of rivers of Papua New Guinea
- List of rivers of Oceania
- List of rivers by discharge
- Geography of Papua New Guinea
- Bamu language, a language of Papua New Guinea
- Bamu Rural LLG, Papua New Guinea
- Southern New Guinea freshwater swamp forests
