= Bamu Rural LLG =

Local-level government in Papua New Guinea

- District map of Western Province

- Location within Papua New Guinea
- Coordinates: 7.53°S 143.14°E
- Country: Papua New Guinea
- Province: Western Province
- Time zone: UTC+10 (AEST)

Bamu Rural LLG is a local-level government (LLG) of Western Province, Papua New Guinea. The Kamula language is spoken in the LLG, near the Wawoi Falls area.

== Wards ==
- 01. Samakopa (Kamula language speakers)
- 02. Kawalasi
- 03. Kamusi ( Dau usoami - Language speakers)
- 04. Parieme ( Dau uusoami-Language speakers)
- 05. Bibisa (Foia Foia language speakers)
- 06. Gagori
- 07. Iowa
- 08. Garu
- 09. Miruwo
- 10. Wakau/Sogere
- 11. Asaramio
- 12. Bina
- 13. Sisiam
- 14. Torobina
- 15. Bamio
- 16. Pirupiru
- 17. Ukusi
- 18. Nemeti
- 19. Ibuo

== See also ==
- Bamu River
- Wawoi River
