= Aitape River =

River in Papua New Guinea

- Location within Papua New Guinea

Location
- Country: Papua New Guinea
- Region: Sandaun Province

Physical characteristics
- Source
  - location: Papua New Guinea
- Mouth
  - coordinates: 3°08′00″S 142°21′00″E

The Aitape River is a river in the Aitape area of northern Papua New Guinea.

== See also ==
- List of rivers of Papua New Guinea
