= Armit =

Armit is a surname. Notable people with the surname include:

- Barney Armit (1874–1899), New Zealand international rugby union player
- Chris Armit (born 1983), Australian rugby league player
- William Edington Armit (1848–1901), Native Police officer and colonial administrator
