= William Edington Armit =

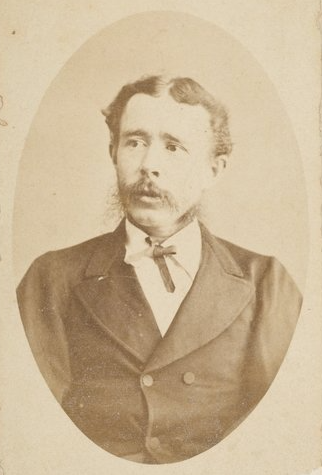
William Edington Armit

William Edington Armit (10 May 1848 – 3 January 1901) was a soldier, sailor, Native Police officer in the British colony of Queensland, explorer, naturalist and colonial administrator in British New Guinea. Armit is regarded as one of the most violent officers of the paramilitary Native Police force.

== Early life ==
William Edington Armit was born Guillaume Edington Armit in Liège in 1848. He was born to an Anglo-Irish army agent John Lees Armit and his second wife Elizabeth Yeldham. He later modified his name to William Edington de Marguerittes (de Magrat) Amrit, taking on the French appellation of his father's first wife who was no relation to him.

As a youth, Armit is said to have joined the military but for which country and where is unclear.

== Australia ==
Armit arrived in New South Wales at the age of 16 as a sailor in 1866. He moved to the British colony of Queensland the following year and took up a position as a stockman on Dotswood station in 1871, where he married Mariann Barton.

== Queensland Native Police ==
=== Cardwell ===
Armit was appointed as a sub-inspector in the Queensland Native Police in June 1872 and was initially posted to the Murray River barracks near Cardwell in the far north of the colony. Later in the year, Armit, with his troopers, "dispersed" the numerous Aboriginal people who lived near Cardwell for cutting and stealing telegraph wire. Armit's detachment was also tasked with acting as an armed escort for the gold transport from the Georgetown goldfields to the west of the town. Armit had to reinforce his troopers to counter local Aboriginal resistance which had cut off meat supplies to Cardwell by destroying bridges, spearing horses and scaring off cattle. His current force being, as the newspaper correspondent at the time put it, "quite unable to keep the blacks in check".

A land-owner in the area stated that Armit regularly provided kidnapped Aboriginal children as servants for colonists. He also claimed that Armit told him that he would "wipe out with the rifle the aborigines of Queensland."

In 1873, Armit with eight of his troopers each armed with a Snider rifle and 30 rounds of ammunition, were sent to deliver "a wholesome corrective" to the Aboriginal people living on Goold Island for their role in the killing of two white fishermen and the stealing of some official documents. Armit's force sailed out to the island and conducted a dawn raid on an Aboriginal camp. The women of the camp ran for their children while the men, numbering around 32, rushed to counter Armit and his troopers with their distinctive wooden swords. Armit, writing about the raid under his nom de plume of "A Queensland Native Police Officer", referred to these Aboriginal people as "savages", "niggers" and "blacks", and described how the troopers started shooting these men with Armit himself also emptying the contents of his Colt firearm at them.

After successfully "dispersing" the camp, they gathered up and took all the "spoils of war" they could from the camp including shields, spears, swords and other belongings of the Aboriginal people. Most of the surviving Aboriginal men fled to nearby islands, leaving the women and children to what Armit described as "our tender mercies". They had "given the blacks a lesson which they would not forget in a hurry".

=== Georgetown ===
In 1875, he was stationed with a detachment of troopers at the Georgetown goldfields to "put an end to the serious mischief lately inflicted by the blacks". He conducted missions which involved capturing Native Police troopers who had deserted, intercepting groups of Aboriginal people who had speared horses, and finding a lost white child.

In 1876, Armit and his troopers were sent out after Aboriginal people who had stuck up the Gilbert River telegraph station. He had earlier returned from a patrol where he had been "dispersing" a large number of Aboriginal people along the Einasleigh River, destroying their wet season village of huts and bunks, preventing their existence in the area. Armit's actions were described as "murderous work" resulting in "the reduction of the tribe to utter misery through starvation and exposure" and "the deaths of helpless women and innocent babes". In March 1876, Armit was promoted to first class sub-inspector.

Armit conducted a lengthy patrol in June that year that extended nearly to the Walsh River, skirmishing with Aboriginal people on three separate occasions. He and his troopers expended all their ammunition during these battles, fighting at times with tomahawks. They succeeded in capturing a large number of spears and a young Aboriginal girl.

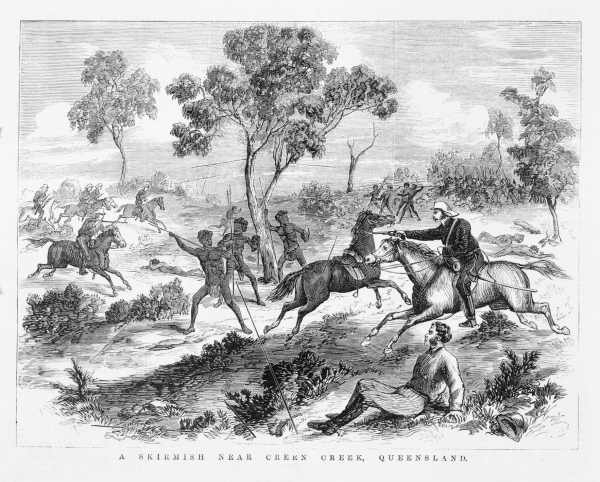
Skirmish between Armit's Native Police troopers and Aboriginal men at Creen Creek

In July 1876, Armit with another Native Police officer in sub-inspector Lyndon Poingdestre and their troopers had a skirmish with a large group of Aboriginal men holding a bora ceremony near the Creen Creek telegraph station. The fight lasted for a significant time and Armit's horse was killed from under him, but the Native Police eventually were able to disperse them despite their determined resistance. This became known as the "Battle of Creen Creek" and a drawing of the event was published in a number of colonial Australian newspapers.

Armit's barracks at Georgetown were called Dunrobin and were located on Sutherland's Creek a few miles out of the town. His family lived with him at the barracks, with a daughter being born there while another daughter died. He began to show interest in botany and wrote articles on local plants. Specimens collected by Armit in Queensland and Papua New Guinea are cared for in herbaria including the National Herbarium of Victoria (MEL), Royal Botanic Gardens Victoria

Armit continued to do gold escort work and was also given the role of head officer of the general police in the region. In 1878, Armit was part of the first British group to explore Barker's Cave, a lava tube which is now part of the Undara Volcanic National Park. His troopers believed they found evidence in the cave that a white woman had been travelling with Aboriginal people. Armit also conducted a punitive expedition against Aboriginal people who had murdered a man named Manual Yous, with a trooper being speared during the mission.

=== Brisbane ===
In 1879 Armit was transferred to Brisbane as a senior investigating officer conducting general police work.

=== Somerset and Normanton ===
Armit returned to the Native Police in 1879 and in July that same year accompanied Captain Charles Edward Pennefather on aboard the Queensland Government Schooner (QGS) ‘Pearl’ on an expedition to the Torres Strait. Captain Pennefather's assignment was to advise the Indigenous populations that the Islands would now be administered by the Queensland Government under the ‘Queensland Coast Islands Act 1879’, which was announced two days earlier. Armit was sent with a detachment of six troopers to the Cape York outpost of Somerset due to "depredations" by the Aboriginal population. He was soon transferred again to the Native Police barracks on the Bynoe River near Normanton, where he pursued Aboriginal people that had pilfered a cattle station.

Armit was temporarily dismissed from the force in 1880 for disciplinary reasons.

While at Normanton, Armit wrote a significant commentary to The Queenslander periodical, defending the operations of the Native Police. He stated that "unseemly bickerings" about the officers should be "stringently suppressed" and that any measures brought in to protect Aboriginal people would be counter-productive and costly. He admitted that the force should be reformed as it was powerless to prevent private patrols and the regular kidnapping of Aboriginal boys and girls by bullock-drivers, the Native Police limited to only "dispersing blacks when really necessary and keeping them from infesting the roads".

He went on to say that the "native races of Australia were doomed on the advent of the white man" and that reserves for Aboriginal people served only to protect them from "well merited punishment". He claimed that reserves were too expensive while at the same time estimating that the Native Police cost the government £10,000 per year. Armit also admitted that the Native Police shot innocent people with the guilty, but explained it by saying that it was difficult to identify the actual criminals, and that they must be ruled over by fear. He also wrote that the officers of the Native Police should not "hesitate in meting out such punishment as will most effectually deter such bloodthirsty savages from repeating their aggressions" and that "the lives of such men, and of the party under their control, are of more value to the nation than those of a hundred blacks."

=== Carl Creek ===
Armit was re-instated to the Native Police a couple of months later (demoted to second class sub-inspector) and posted to the Carl Creek Native Police barracks on the Gregory River.

He later wrote an account under his pseudonym describing an Aboriginal initiation ceremony which he termed a "bora" which took place in a secluded gorge in the region. He thought it appropriate to document this ceremony before "the encroachments of the dominant race have rendered its performance impossible". He was only able to witness the "bora" after a female lookout was captured by one of his troopers. Armit and his troopers covertly watched the ceremony whilst heavily armed with rifles and ammunition, his Aboriginal troopers often asking him for permission to attack the camp which was populated with over a hundred unsuspecting men, women and children. He wrote how it was difficult in this region to punish "the savages" due to the many caves and gorges. Even though Armit thought Aboriginal people were "uncivilized, cannibals and wholesale murderers", and regarded the ceremony as a "curious rite", his account of the culturally secretive "bora" is highly descriptive.

In 1882, Armit's detachment at Carl Creek was joined by the unit led by sub-inspector Lyndon Poingdestre. The two officers had a bitter dispute, with Armit accusing Poingdestre of using Aboriginal girls as personal prostitutes, and Armit being accused of drunkenness. This dispute led to Armit being permanently dismissed from the Native Police in April for discipline and financial irregularities. He later became insolvent and worked in Cooktown as a member of the chamber of commerce and as a journalist.

== British New Guinea ==
=== Expeditions to New Guinea in the 1880s ===
In 1883 Armit led an expedition to New Guinea as a special correspondent for The Argus newspaper, giving himself the rank of captain. He journeyed 16 miles inland from the recently colonised British settlement of Port Moresby but had to return due to the death of one of his contingent and most of the others, including himself, suffering from fever.

He later based himself in Cooktown where, amongst other things, he worked as the editor for the Cooktown Courier and became insolvent. He was part of several other small expeditions to New Guinea and its nearby islands. Notably, during a journey to the Louisiade Archipelago, Armit was able to secure evidence against the crew of the blackbirding vessel Hopeful who kidnapped and murdered many local people on one of their recruitment voyages for the Queensland South Sea Islander labour trade.

Armit returned to Cooktown where he was employed in various bureaucratic roles. On a number of occasions he volunteered his services to "punish the natives" of several New Guinea islands after news of their implication in the killings of white men arrived in the town. He expressed a desire to lead a squad of fifty Native Police troopers to conduct a punitive expedition to one of these islands.

=== British New Guinea administrator ===
In 1893, he was appointed as acting private secretary to William Macgregor, the governor of British New Guinea, and later that year he was given the role of acting commandant of the British New Guinea police, helping to conduct large expeditions to quell tribal disturbances and capture prisoners in the Cloudy Bay district and inland from Port Moresby.

In early 1894, Armit toured the villages of the Purari River delta with Governor Macgregor. They became involved in a skirmish with a large contingent of Koriki people armed with bows and arrows. However, with the 20 troopers under their command discharging 400 rounds from their Snider and Martini-Henry rifles, Armit and Macgregor were able to inflict casualties upon the Koriki and defeat them. Later that year, after a massacre of the inhabitants of Magaubo on the southern coast by a confederacy of hill tribes, Armit was stationed in this region with a dozen troopers to chase down the killers and establish British authority.

In the latter half of 1894 Armit was appointed as acting Resident Magistrate to several regions including the Central, Mekeo and Rigo districts. During this period, he was given command of a punitive expedition to punish and arrest the Kaohi people from the Astrolabe Range for their massacre of coastal villagers near Port Moresby. Armit, with a detachment of 50 troopers, pursued the Kaohi through the mountains, arresting eight and killing at least another eight or ten.

Armit was appointed to the position of customs officer at the regional administration headquarters on the island of Samarai in 1895. He left the government service the following year in order to become involved in creating a rubber plantation industry on the island. However, he soon returned to the colonial administration in 1899, becoming Resident Magistrate of the Mambare District in the northern part of the colony.

Since 1895, the Mambare River area was a place of consistent conflict between the resident Binandere people and the Anglo-Australian miners come to extract the gold found in the region together with the police who came with them. Armit was commander of the local detachment of police troopers, being stationed at Tamata. In 1900, he led a patrol to the Kumusi River and the Yodda goldfields, killing 13 people at Papaki, to teach the locals a "salutary lesson" not to steal from the miners. Around Kokoda, Armit's group shot a further 17 villagers in another massacre, and later shot dead another 24 men in further skirmishes. He aimed to prevent the local people from being able to live in their villages for two years.

== Death ==
Armit died of fever at Tamata in 1901 and is buried at the Ioma government station. After his death, reports were made to the Governor of British New Guinea that Armit would drill his troopers while drunk and naked, and would also use crucified prisoners as target practice. His son, Lionel Armit, also became a government administrator in New Guinea.

The grass Eriachne armitii and the Gouldian finch Poephila armitiana (now known as Chloebia gouldiae) were named in his honour.
