= Balima River =

The Balima River may refer to:

- Balima River (Papua New Guinea)
- Balima River (Democratic Republic of the Congo)
