= Vanapa (disambiguation) =

Vanapa may refer to:

- Vana Pa, a Mizo Pasaltha and warrior.
- Vanapa River, a river in Papua New Guinea.
