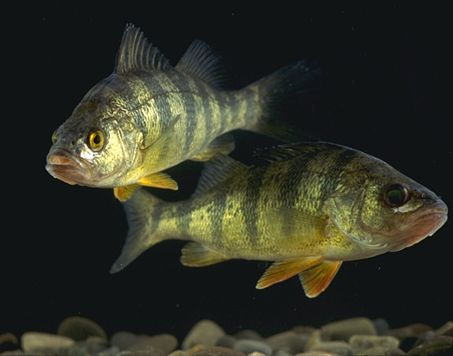
- Yellow perch (Perca flavescens)

Scientific classification
- Kingdom: Animalia
- Phylum: Chordata
- Class: Actinopterygii
- Division: Teleostei
- Order: Perciformes
- Family: Percidae
- Subfamily: Percinae
- Genus: Perca; Linnaeus, 1758

Type species
- Perca fluviatilis Linnaeus, 1758

Species
- P. flavescens Mitchill, 1814 (yellow perch); P. fluviatilis Linnaeus, 1758 (European perch); P. schrenkii Kessler, 1874 (Balkhash perch)

= Perch =

Perches Temporal range: Middle Miocene–recent

Genus of fishes

Perch is a common name for freshwater fish from the genus Perca, which belongs to the family Percidae of the large order Perciformes. The name comes from Greek: πέρκη, romanized: perke, meaning the type species of this genus, the European perch (P. fluviatilis).

Many species of freshwater game fish more or less resemble perch, but belong to different genera. In fact, the exclusively saltwater-dwelling red drum (which belongs to a different order Acanthuriformes) is often referred to as a "red perch", though by definition perch are freshwater species. Though many fish are referred to as perch as a common name, to be considered a true perch, the fish must be of the family Percidae.

The earliest fossil remains of Perca are known from the Middle Miocene of Ukraine.

== Species ==
Most authorities recognize three species within the perch genus:

- The European perch (P. fluviatilis) is primarily found in Europe, but a few can also be found in South Africa, and even as far east on the Southern hemisphere as Australia. This species is typically greenish in color with dark vertical bars on its sides with a red or orange coloring in the tips of its fins. The European perch has been successfully introduced in New Zealand and Australia, where it is known as the redfin perch or English perch. In Australia, larger specimens have been bred, but the species rarely grows heavier than 2.7 kg (6 lb).
- The Balkhash perch (P. schrenkii) is found in Kazakhstan, (in Lake Balkhash and Lake Alakol), Uzbekistan, and China. It has a dark gray/black color on its dorsal side, but the ventral areas of the fish are a lighter silver or even sometimes green color. The Balkhash perch also displays the vertical bars on its sides, similar to the European and yellow perches. In the latter half of the 20th century, the Balkhash perch was introduced into the basins of the Nuru and Chu rivers. The introduction of these fishes to the Nuru and Chu rivers was successful. Because of this success, the population of Balkhash perch in the Balkhash Lake is rarer now. They are similar in size to the yellow and European perches, weighing around 1.5 kg (3 lb 5 oz).
- The yellow perch (P. flavescens), smaller and paler than the European perch (but otherwise nearly identical), is found in North America. In northern areas, it is sometimes referred to as the lake perch. This species is prized for its food quality and has often been raised in hatcheries and introduced into areas in which it is not native. These fish typically only reach a size of about 38 cm (15 in) and 1 kg (2 lb 3 oz).
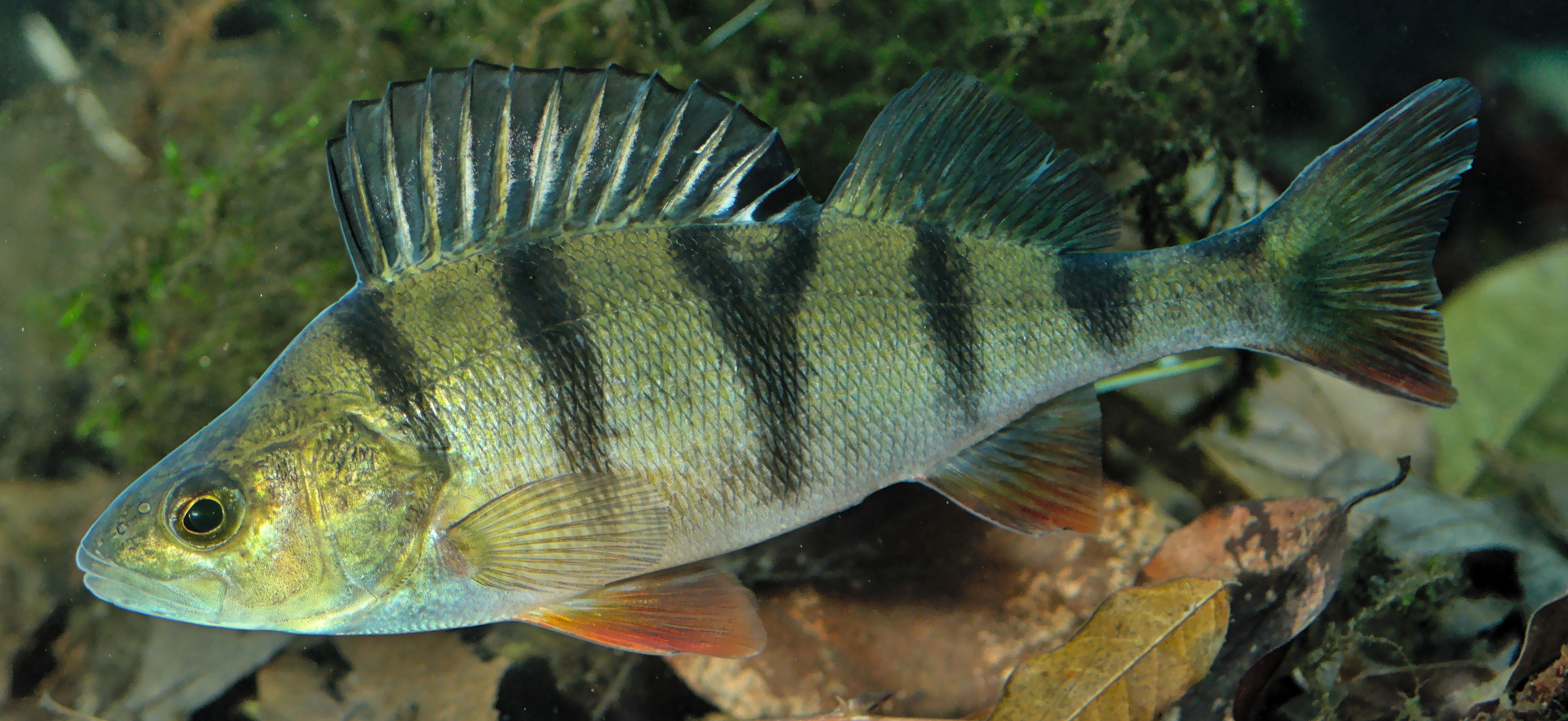
  Perca fluviatilis
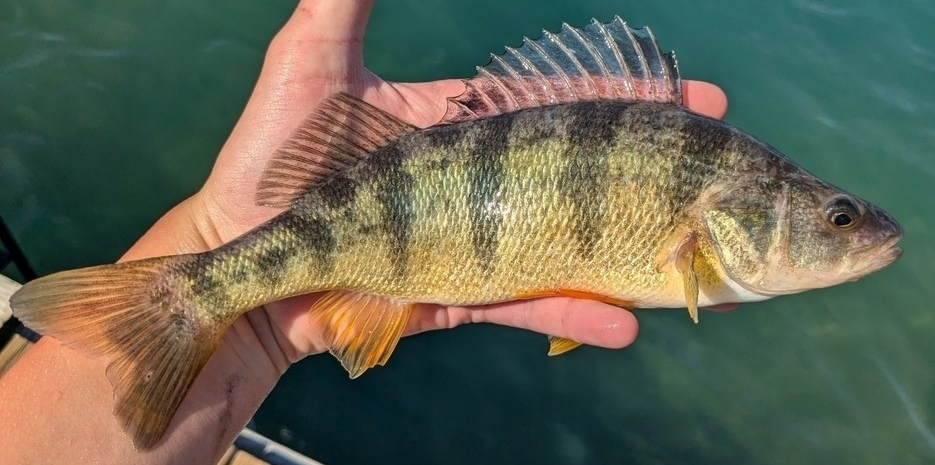
  Perca flavescens
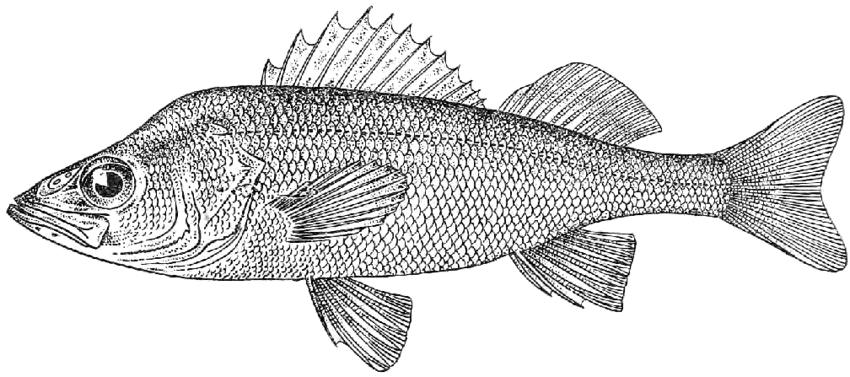
  Perca schrenkii

== Anatomy ==
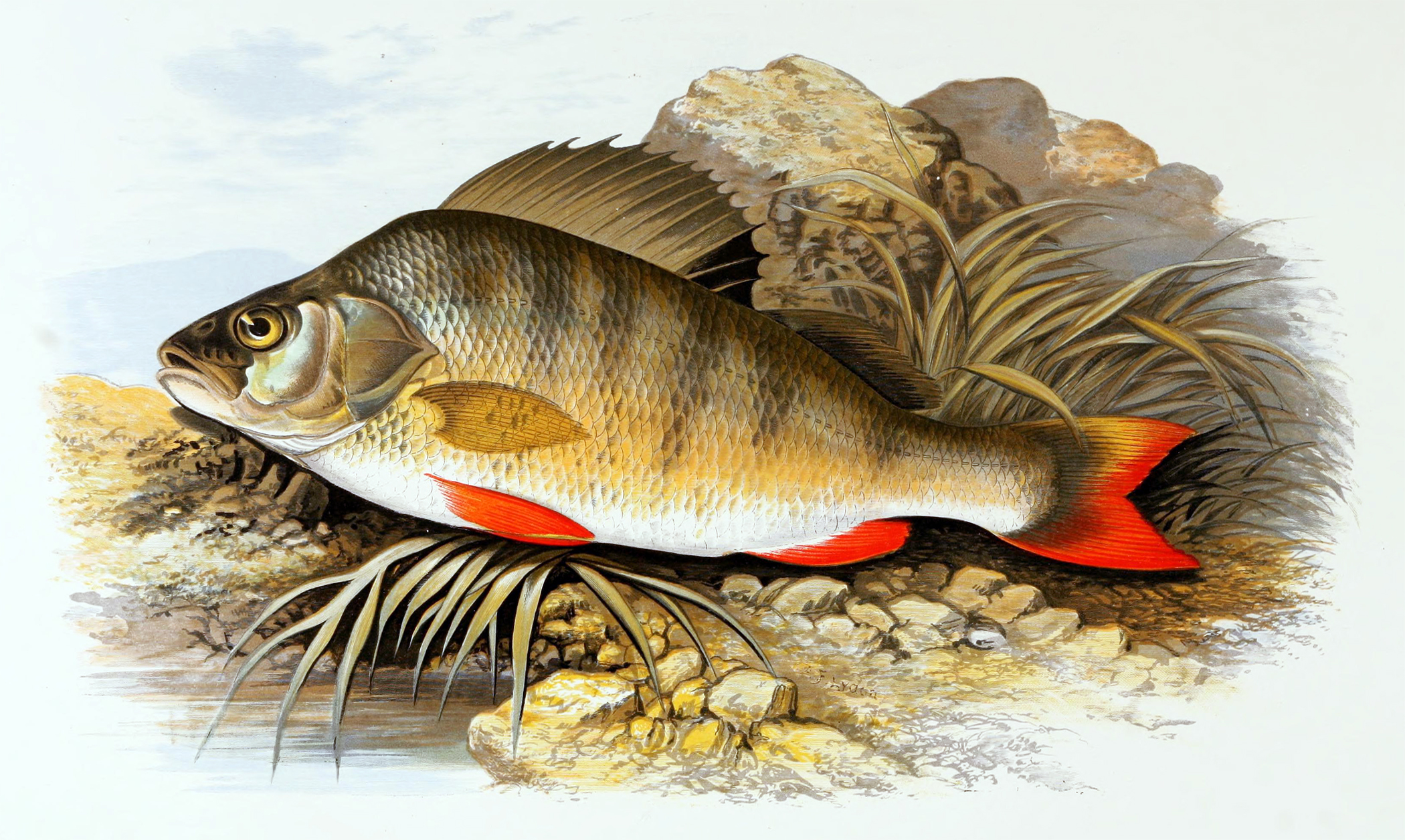
European perch (Perca fluviatilis), exhibiting its green coloration and red tipped fins, as well as the vertical bars on its sides.

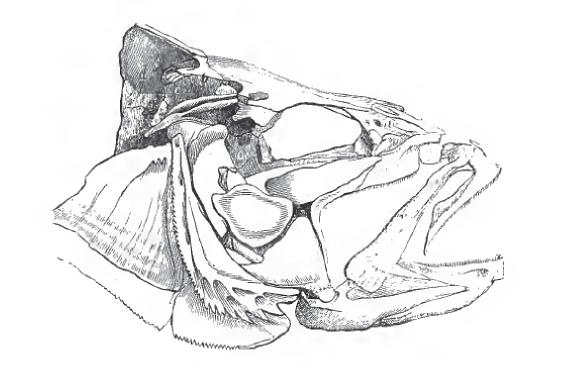
Skull of the European Perch showing the eye sockets, connective bones, operculum, and gill slits.

=== External anatomy ===
Perch have a long and round body shape which allows for fast swimming in the water. True perch have "rough" or ctenoid scales. Perch have paired pectoral and pelvic fins, and two dorsal fins, the first one spiny and the second soft. These two fins can be separate or joined. The head consists of the skull (formed from loosely connected bones), eyes, mouth, operculum, gills, and a pair of nostrils (which has no connection to the oral cavity). They have small brush-like teeth across their jaws and on the roof of their mouth. The gills are located under the operculum on both sides of the head and are used to extract oxygen molecules from water and expel carbon dioxide; the gills have gill rakers inside the mouth.

External anatomy can be used to determine the sex of perch in multiple ways. Perch have two posterior openings located on their abdomen, the anal and urogenital. In males, the shape of the urogenital opening is round and larger than the anal opening. In females, the urogenital opening is often a V- or U-shape which is a similar size to the anal opening. Also, males usually have a more brown-red colored urogenital opening compared to females.

=== Internal anatomy ===
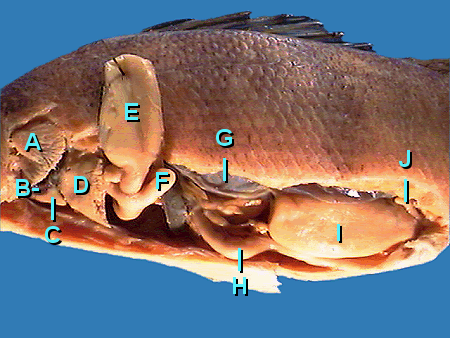
Internal anatomy of yellow perch (P. flavescens). Gills (A), auricle of the heart (B), ventricle of the heart (C), liver (D), E: stomach (E), digestive cecum (F), swim bladder (G), intestine (H), testis (I), and urinary bladder (J).

The esophagus is a flexible tube that goes from the mouth to the stomach. The stomach is connected to the intestine via the pyloric sphincter. The intestines of perch consist of the small intestine and large intestine; the intestines have many pyloric caeca and a spiral value, the small intestine consists of a part called the duodenum. The spleen is located after the stomach and before the spiral value. The spleen is connected to the circulatory system, not part of the digestive tract. The liver is composed of three lobes: one small lobe (includes the gall bladder) and two large lobes. Perch have long and narrow kidneys that contain clusters of nephrons which empty into the mesonephric duct. They have a two-chambered heart consisting of four compartments: the sinus venous, one atrium, one ventricle, and conus. Perch have a swim bladder that helps control buoyancy or floating within the water, the swim bladder is only found in bony fish. In perch, the duct connecting the swim bladder to the pharynx is closed so air is unable to pass through from the mouth, these fish are called physoclists. Specifically in perch, the gas bladder can vary from 12% to 25% of oxygen and 1.4% to 2.9% of carbon dioxide gas. Perch reproductive organs include either a pair of testes (sperm-producing) or a pair of ovaries (egg-producing).

== Habitats ==
Perch are classified as carnivores, choosing waters where smaller fish, shellfish, zooplankton, and insect larvae are abundant. The yellow perch can be found in the central parts of the United States in freshwater ponds, lakes, streams, or rivers. These fish can be found in freshwater all over the world, and are known to inhabit the Great Lake region, in particular Lake Erie. These fish inhabit bodies of water where vegetation and debris is readily accessible. In the spring when the perch chooses to spawn, they use vegetation to conceal their eggs from predators.

== Fishing ==
Perch are a popular sport fish species. They are known to put up a fight, and to be good for eating. They can be caught with a variety of methods, including float fishing, lure fishing, and ledgering. Fly fishing for perch using patterns that imitate small fry or invertebrates can be successful. The record weight for this fish in Britain is 2.81 kg (6 lb 3 oz), the Netherlands 3.05 kg (6 lb 11 1/2 oz), and in America 2.83 kg (6 lb 4 oz). The biggest recorded catch in Sweden is 3.15 kg (6 lb 15oz) in 1985.

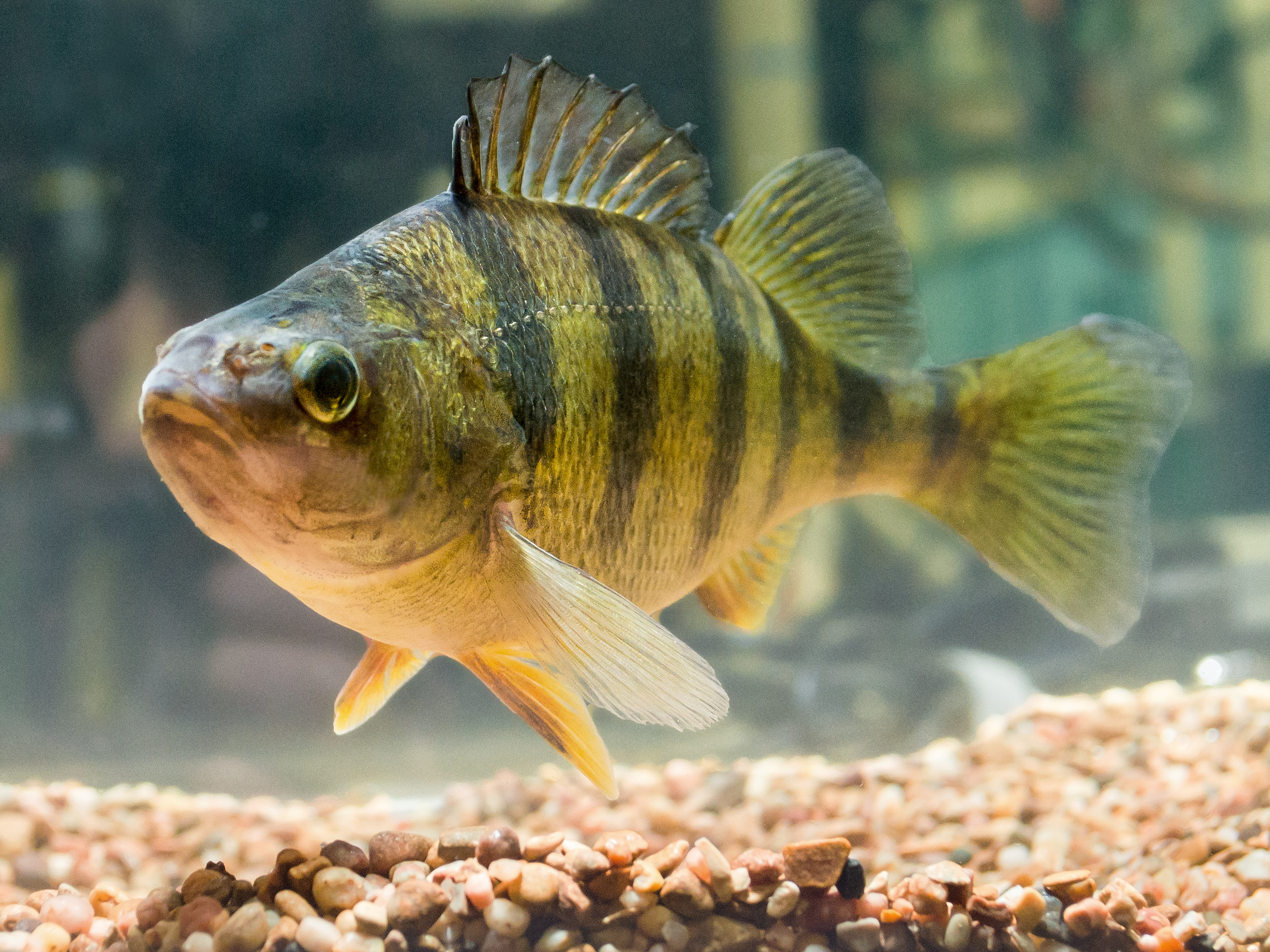
Photograph of a fully mature yellow perch (Perca flavescens).

Perch grow to around 50 cm (20 in) and 2.3 kg (5 lb) or more, but the most common size caught are around 30 cm (1 ft) and 450 g (1 lb) or less and anything over 40 cm (16 in) and 900 g (2 lb) is considered a prize catch.
