= Gope =

Gope, GOPE, or GOPe may refer to:

- Gop, Odisha, a town in India
- Gopa (caste)
- Grand Old Party establishment, American Republican Party establishment
- Grupo de Operaciones Policiales Especiales, a police special operations unit in Chile
- Gope (actor) (1917–1957), Indian Hindi actor
- Gope (Papua), a type of spiritual sculpture
- Gope College, Midnapore, West Bengal, India

== See also ==
- Gope board
