= Kokun =

Kokun may refer to:

- Kokun River, a river in Madang Province, Papua New Guinea
- Kokun languages, a group of the Mabuso languages, a small family of closely related languages in New Guinea
- Kokūn, the Japanese name for Kakuna, a fictional species of Pokémon
- Kokun and Bayer, two characters from Jujutsu Kaisen
