= Karl Schneider =

Karl Schneider may refer to:

- Karl Schneider (German geologist) (1859–1933), German geologist, publisher
- Karl Schneider (activist) (1869–1940), German ophthalmologist, activist, resistance fighter against Nazis
- Karl Schneider (Swiss footballer) (active 1899–1901), Swiss footballer
- Karl Schneider (Swiss architect) (1884–1959), Swiss architect
- Karl Schneider (German architect) (1892–1945), German architect
- Karl Schneider (Austrian footballer) (born 1902)
- Karl Schneider (cricketer) (1905–1928), Australian cricketer
- Karl Schneider (philologist) (1912–1998), German philologist
- Karl Schneider (art director) (1916–1996), German film set designer

- Karl Max Schneider (1887–1955), East German zoologist

== See also ==
- Carl Schneider
