= Akiapmin =

- Populated Place
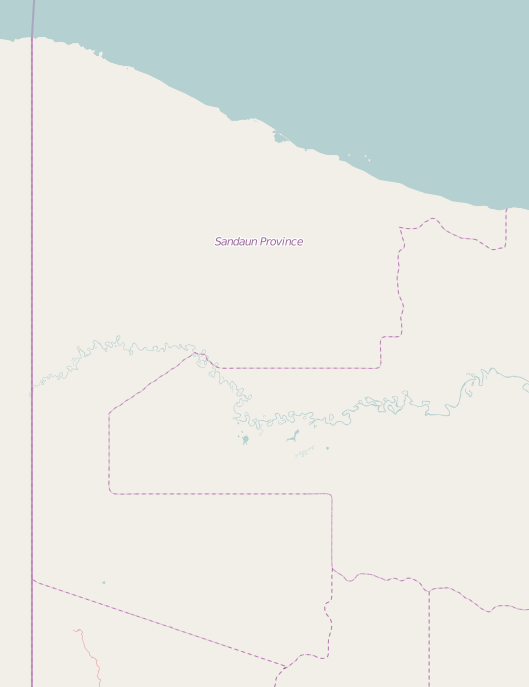
- Location within Papua New Guinea Location within Sandaun Province
- Coordinates: 5°01′38″S 142°06′02″E
- Country: Papua New Guinea
- Province: Sandaun
- Time zone: Pacific Time

Akiapmin is a small town in Sandaun Province, Papua New Guinea. Its climate is Rainforest Climate. It’s located near the Ogon River, and the Big Limestone River.
