= Dimir River =

River in Papua New Guinea

Dimer River
- Location within Papua New Guinea

Location
- Country: Papua New Guinea
- Region: Madang Province

Physical characteristics
- Source
  - location: Papua New Guinea
- Mouth
  - coordinates: 5°34′00″S 146°12′00″E

The Dimir River or Dimer River is a river in Madang Province, Papua New Guinea.

The Dimir language is spoken in the area.

== See also ==
- List of rivers of Papua New Guinea
