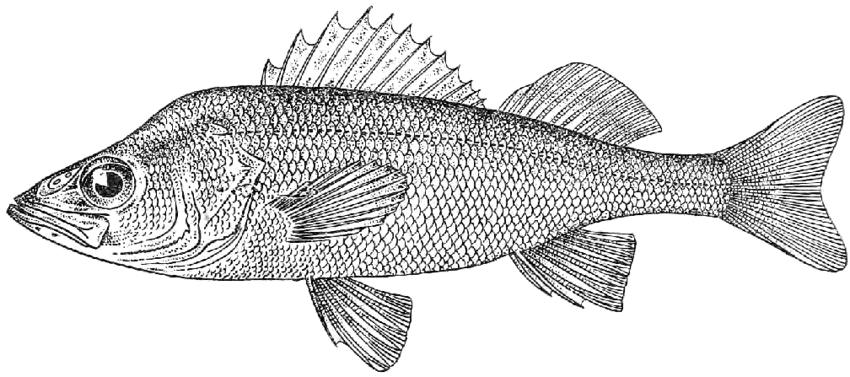

Conservation status
- Least Concern (IUCN 3.1)

Scientific classification
- Kingdom: Animalia
- Phylum: Chordata
- Class: Actinopterygii
- Order: Perciformes
- Family: Percidae
- Genus: Perca
- Species: P. schrenkii

Binomial name
- Perca schrenkii Kessler, 1874

= Balkhash perch =

Species of fish

The Balkhash perch (Perca schrenkii) is a species of perch endemic to the Lake Balkhash and Lake Alakol watershed system, which lies mainly in Kazakhstan. It is similar to the other two species of perch, and grows to a comparable size, but has a slimmer build and is lighter in colour.

It has suffered a population decline which is blamed on introduced bream and predatory fish such as the Volga pikeperch.

== Discovery and first scientific description ==
An expedition of Alexander von Schrenk to eastern Turkestan collected this species in 1842, and deposited preserved specimens at the Imperial Academy of Sciences in St. Petersburg; Karl Kessler's formal description was published much later, in 1874, after the rediscovered specimens were sent to him by Alexander Strauch. The description was included in an article on fishes collected by the later expedition to Turkestan of Alexei Pavlovich Fedchenko.

The fish is named in honor of Alexander von Schrenck (1816–1876) the Baltic-German Russian naturalist and collector/explorer of Central Asia and northern Russia. Von Schrenck published observations about this species in 1840.

== Characteristics ==
The Balkhash perch resembles its congeners, the European perch (Perca fluviatilis) and the yellow perch (Perca flavescens), in its general profile and its modest size, reaching a maximum total length of 50 cm and weight of 1.5 kg. Like them it has spines on the tips of the opercula and in the dorsal, pelvic, and anal fins, as well as sharing a similar dentition. It also shares with them the ctenoid scales that lend a rough texture to the fish when handled.

It differs in its longer, thinner build and lower first dorsal fin; and whilst its congeners have marked vertical dark bars on their bodies, the Balkash perch normally lacks such markings when it attains its larger sizes and is of a much paler hue. When vertical bars are present they are usually much less visible than in the other Perca species. There are, however, populations in which such bars are visible, along with coloured fins reminiscent of the other Perca species. The body is covered with larger scales than those of its congeners, with 44–54 on the lateral line.

It is a markedly variable species, occurring in ecomorphic forms that have been termed 'pelagic', 'shoreline', 'riverine', and 'dwarfish'. In other locations forms that grow at different speeds have been distinguished, or in another case 'lake' and 'reed' forms that differed in colour and body shape. Local extirpation has made it impossible to further verify these data.

Individually variable features of the morphology include the presence or absence of a black spot on the first dorsal fin, and the presence or absence of scales on the opercula, as well as the position and number of mucus glands on the head.

== Distribution ==
FishBase reports only that the Balkhash perch is found in Lake Balkhash and Lake Alakol, both in Kazakhstan. N. S. Mamilov, a zoologist working in Kazakhstan, has described it as endemic to "the Balkhash lake watershed, including the Alakol Lakes system", and has mapped the presence and absence of the species in various rivers and other water bodies in that area. Maurice Kottelat, in his 1996 IUCN assessment states that the species' range also extends into parts of this catchment area that are in China, though no data on such populations were available.

The Balkhash perch was introduced into the Nura and the Chu rivers, but in neither case was this a success.

== Fisheries ==
Historically the Balkhash perch was a food fish that provided economically important, and sometimes dominant, fisheries. It constituted one-third of the volume of the commercial catch in Lake Balkash, and two-thirds in the Alakol Lakes system, in the 1930s and 1940s.

== Conservation status ==
In assessments from 1986 to 1994, the IUCN Redlist status of the Balkhash perch was already assessed as 'rare'. The 1996 assessment noted that the population had declined and noted that this decline was blamed on the introduction of bream and predatory species, such as the Volga pikeperch (Sander volgensis). The population trend was described as 'unknown' and the overall assessment was that the species was data deficient.

Mamilov wrote in 2015 that "Although the external morphology and life strategy of the Balkash perch appear rather adaptable, the species' future is uncertain."

== Sources ==
- Mamilov, N.S., Biology of Balkhash Perch (Perca schrenkii Kessler, 1874). Chapter 3 in Couture, Patrice; Pyle, Greg, eds. (2015). Biology of Perch. CRC Press. ISBN 978-1-4987-3033-4.
