= Redscar Bay =

Bay in Central Province, Papua New Guinea

Coordinates: 9°8′49″S 146°50′8″E

Redscar Bay is a bay to the northwest of Port Moresby, Papua New Guinea, extending for about 4 miles (6.4 km) between Cape Suckling and Redscar Head, also situated between Kekeni Rocks and Lagava Island.

== Geography ==
A significant number of rivers and streams flow into the bay, including the Vanapa, Veimauri, and Aroa rivers, and to the northeast is Varivari Island. There is a head of the same name on the coast, a prominent rock which is red in color. Galley Reach, a relatively wide inlet which extends through the bar across the estuary of the bay, is considered a hazard to boats. The Pariwara Islets, two small islets with some rocks, lie 1–2 miles northwestward of Redscar Head, and Redscar Hill rises above the head to a height of 575 feet (175 m). Between Cape Suckling and Redscar there is a coral reef extending 0.5 to 1 mile offshore. The shoreline is low and swampy, with dense woodland.

== History and archaeology ==
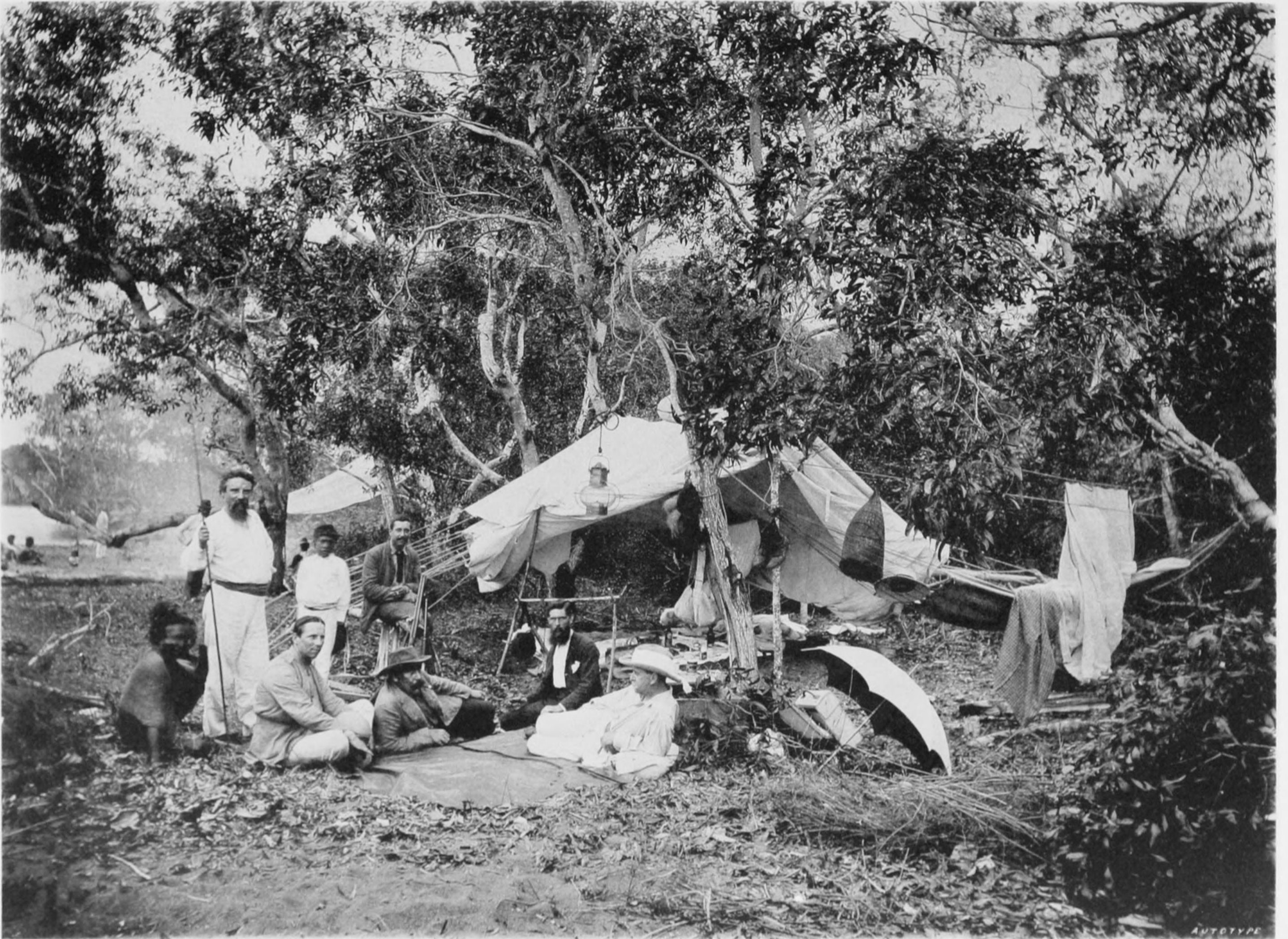
Sir Peter Scratchley's Camp near the bank of the Aroa and Redscar Bay in 1885

Gold was first discovered in Papua New Guinea in 1852 as accidental traces in pottery from Redscar Bay on the Papua Peninsula. Since, numerous items have been discovered in the bay area, and the British Museum is in possession of 44 items, mainly arrows, and spears, an adze, a cooking pot, a necklace, a skirt, and a paddle. Sir Peter Scratchley led an expedition to the area in 1885. The Rogers Airfield was located near the bay and several planes crashed nearby during World War II, including P-39D Airacobra 41-6945, P-39F Airacobra 41-7136, B-25H Mitchell 43-4341, P-47D Thunderbolt, and P-47D "Hi Topper" 42-8081.

== Demographics ==
The Kabadi or Motu languages are spoken in the bay area.
