= Aroa (disambiguation) =

Aroa is a moth genus.

Aroa may also refer to:

- Aroa, Venezuela, the capital of Bolívar Municipality, Yaracuy, Venezuela
- Aroa mines, a defunct copper mine in Yaracuy
- Aroa River (Venezuela)
- Aroa River (Papua New Guinea)
