= Kikori River =

River in Papua New Guinea

Kikori
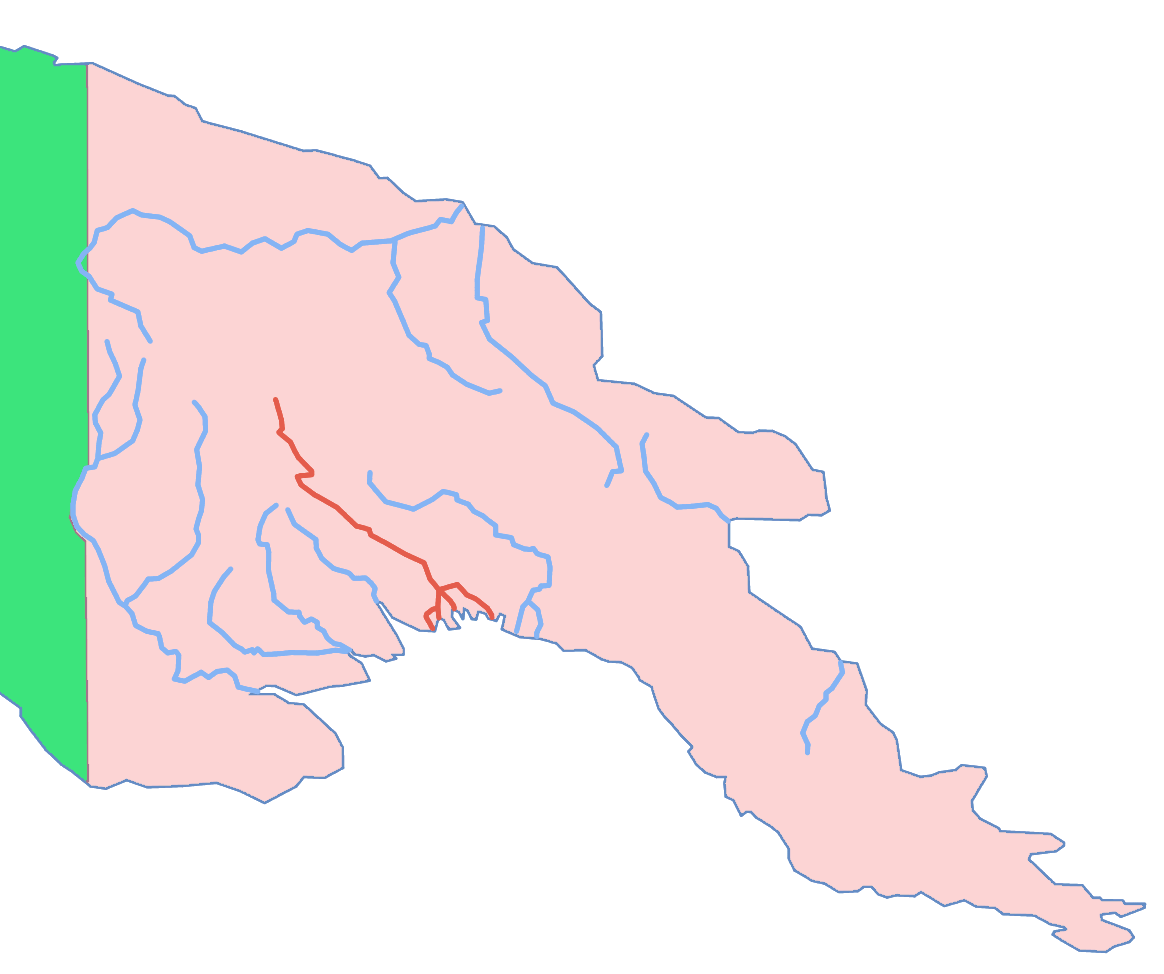

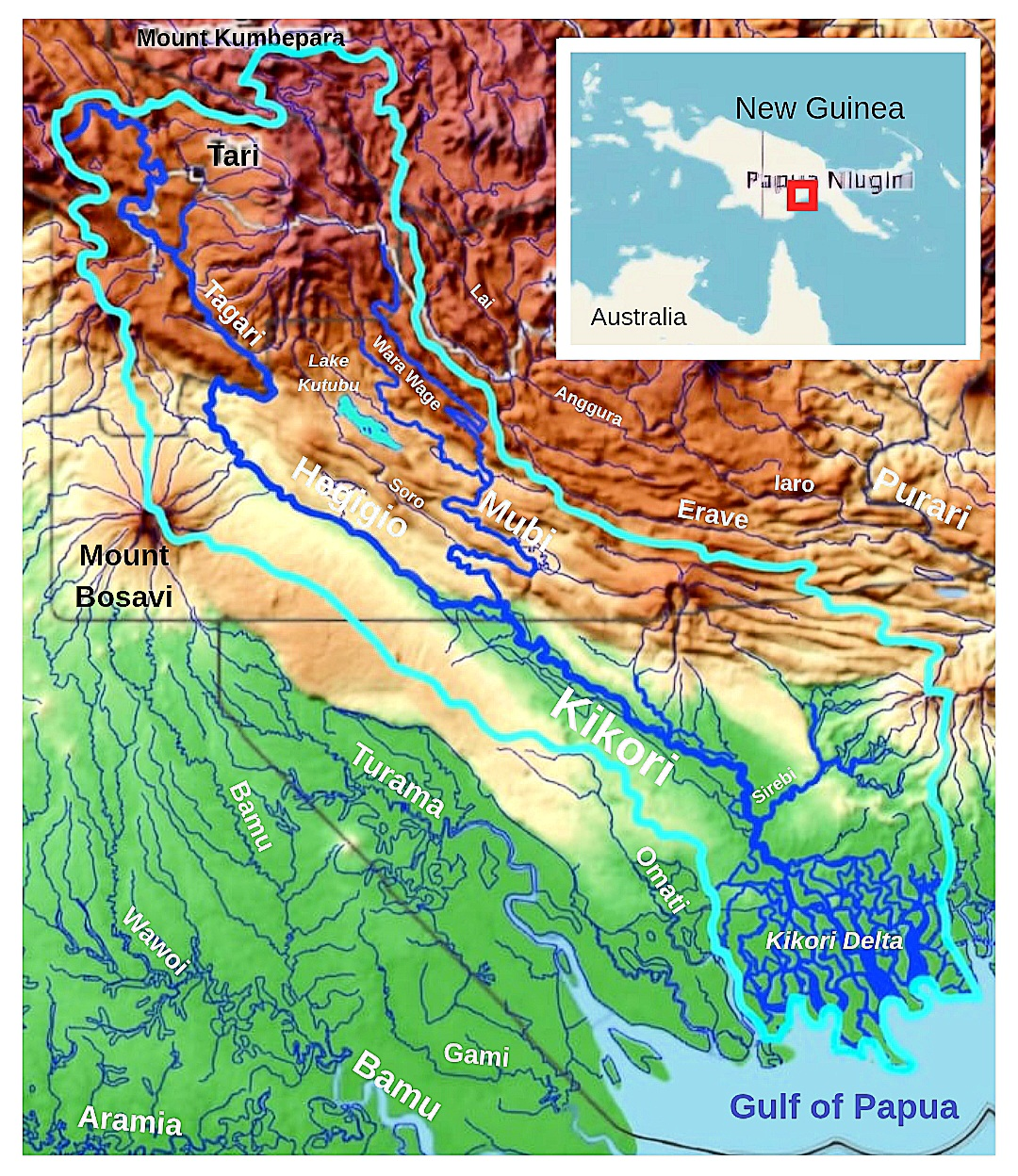
- Kikori River Basin

- Location within Papua New Guinea

Physical characteristics
- Source: Southern Highlands
  - location: Confluence of Hegigio and Mubi
  - coordinates: 6°47′33″S 143°36′55″E
  - elevation: 52 m (171 ft)
- Mouth: Gulf of Papua
  - location: Kikori Delta, Papua New Guinea
  - coordinates: 7°43′00″S 144°16′46″E
  - elevation: 0 ft (0 m)
- Length: Kikori–Hegigio–Tagari 445 km (277 mi)
- Basin size: 18,863.3 km^{2} (7,283.2 mi^{2})
- Discharge
  - location: Kikori Delta
  - average: 2,000 m^{3}/s (71,000 cu ft/s)

Basin features
- Progression: Gulf of Papua
- River system: Kikori River
- Tributaries
  - left: Mubi, Iehi Creek, Ihu, Kahuki Creek, Sirebi
  - right: Hegigio, Keivi Creek, Pinini Creek, Howoi Creek, Utitu Creek

The Kikori River is a major river in southern Papua New Guinea on the island of New Guinea. The river has a total length of 445 km (277 mi) and flows southeast into the Gulf of Papua, with its delta at the head of the gulf. The settlement of Kikori lies on the delta.

== Course ==
The headwaters of the Kikori, the Hegigio and the Tagari, originate in the south-eastern part of the Muller plateau. The Hegigio descends through a wild gorge into the Papua Plain. From the mouth of the Mubi River, it is known as the Kikori and flows into the Gulf of Papua, with a large marshy delta.

== Geography and hydrology ==
The catchment area extends from alpine grasslands of the Southern Highlands to mangrove wetlands of the mouth at Gulf of Papua. The Kikori arises at the confluence of the Hegigio with the Mubi River or Digimu River, into which Lake Kutubu drained. The average rainfall in the Kikori catchment is 5,900 millimetres or 230 inches.

The city of the same name is located on the right bank just before its confluence with the delta.

The Kikori catchment area is very rain-fed (2,500–5,500 mm – up to 7,000 mm in places in the south) and is classified as type Af according to the Köppen climate classification. The mountainous areas of the catchment cover large areas of karst. It is characterised by high biodiversity and sparsely populated areas. Average annual sediment load is 50 million tonnes.

== Tributaries ==
The largest tributaries of the Kikori:

| Left tributary | Right tributary | Length (km) | Basin size (km^{2}) | Average discharge (m^{3}/s) |
|---|---|---|---|---|
| Kikori | | 445 | 18,863.3 | 2,000 |
| | Utitu Creek (Ituti C.) | | 147.7 | 14.8 |
| Sirebi | | | 1,573.5 | 143.5 |
| | Howoi Creek | | 177.6 | 18.3 |
| Kahuki Creek | | | 140.4 | 14 |
| | Pinini Creek | | 293.3 | 29.5 |
| Ihu (Ario Creek) | | | 502.6 | 47.9 |
| Iehi Creek | | 57 | 541.7 | 66.3 |
| | Keivi Creek | | 290.6 | 36.9 |
| | Hegigio | 183 | 7,002.2 | 812.1 |
| Mubi | | 160 | 4,591.2 | 472.1 |

== Discharge ==
| Year, period | Average discharge | Ref. |
|---|---|---|
Kikori Delta 7°41′33.1296″S 144°29′26.9304″E
| 1986 | 2,000 m^{3}/s (71,000 cu ft/s) | |
| 1977 | 1,200 m^{3}/s (42,000 cu ft/s) | |
| | 3,274 m^{3}/s (115,600 cu ft/s) | |
Kaiam 7°5′48.8724″S 143°59′39.5772″E
| 1971–2000 | 1,059.2 m^{3}/s (37,410 cu ft/s) | |
| | 1,508 m^{3}/s (53,300 cu ft/s) | |
| | 2,531 m^{3}/s (89,400 cu ft/s)^{*} | |

^{*}Minimum discharge: 670 m^{3}/s (24,000 cu ft/s); Maximum discharge: 4,414 m^{3}/s (155,900 cu ft/s);

== Economy ==
The Kikori river basin is home to large oil and gas fields that have been mined since the 1990s. A pipeline for oil and gas transport ( Papua New Guinea LNG Project) runs in the Kikori River system from Lake Kutubu over to Papua Gulf.

== Biodiversity ==
The Kikori river system is known for its biodiversity. Mount Bosavi, which is well known in this respect, lies on the western edge of the Kikori river basin. The catchment area of the Kikori includes more than 100 species of fish, of which 14 percent are endemic; along with the western, and much longer Fly River, it is the most species-rich river in New Guinea. However, most of the endemic fish do not live in the rivers, but in Lake Kutubu. Furthermore, in the Kikori Basin there are three species of cherax, an endemic blind cavern Oxyeleotris caeca and six species of freshwater turtles.

== See also ==
- List of rivers of Papua New Guinea
- List of rivers of Oceania
- List of rivers by discharge
- Southern New Guinea freshwater swamp forests
- Kikori
- Kikori River languages
- Kikori District
