= Omosa River =

River in Papua New Guinea

Omosa River Kokun River
- Location within Papua New Guinea

Location
- Country: Papua New Guinea
- Region: Madang Province

Physical characteristics
- Source
  - location: Papua New Guinea
- Mouth
  - coordinates: 4°57′45″S 145°05′01″E

The Omosa River is a river in Madang Province, Papua New Guinea.

The Omosan languages are spoken in the area.

== See also ==
- List of rivers of Papua New Guinea
- Omosa River languages
