= Porlock Bay, Papua New Guinea =

Bay in Dyke Ackland Bay, Papua New Guinea

Coordinates: 9°02′S 149°00′E

Porlock Bay is a bay within Dyke Ackland Bay, Oro Province of Papua New Guinea named by Captain John Moresby after Porlock Bay in Somerset, England.

The harbour, known as Porlock Harbour, within the bay was utilised by the American and Australian armed forces as a safe anchorage and supply depot during World War II. A battery of anti-aircraft guns was positioned at Cody's Point.
