= Turama River =

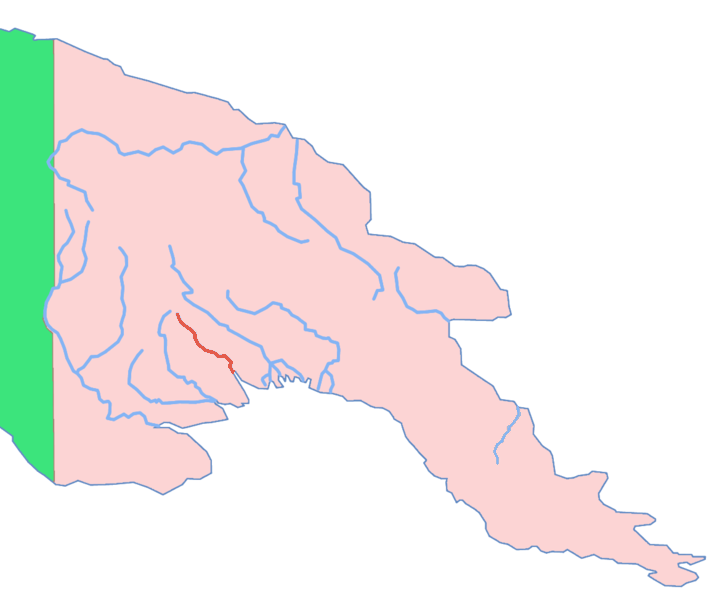
- Turama River (location)

Location
- Country: Papua New Guinea
- Region: Southern Highlands, Western, Gulf

Physical characteristics
- Source: Mount Bosavi
  - location: Papua New Guinea
  - coordinates: 7°40′S 143°50′E
  - elevation: 1,000 m (3,300 ft)
- Mouth
  - location: Gulf of Papua, Papua New Guinea
  - elevation: 0 metres (0 ft)
- Length: 302 km (188 mi)
- Basin size: 6,740 km^{2} (2,600 sq mi)
- Discharge
  - location: Near mouth
  - average: 988 m^{3}/s (34,900 cu ft/s)

Basin features
- Progression: Gulf of Papua
- River system: Turama River
- Tributaries
  - left: Hawoi, Gania
  - right: Kanuwe Creek, Komewu Creek

The Turama River is a river of Papua New Guinea. Approximately 10 miles (16 km) wide at the mouth, with a total length of 302 km (188 mi), it narrows rapidly. This, combined with its location at the head of the Gulf of Papua, results in tidal bores sweeping up the river. The effects are noticeable as far as 100 km upstream.

== See also ==
- List of rivers of Papua New Guinea
- List of rivers of Oceania
- Turama–Kikorian languages
- Southern New Guinea freshwater swamp forests
