= Markham River =

Markham
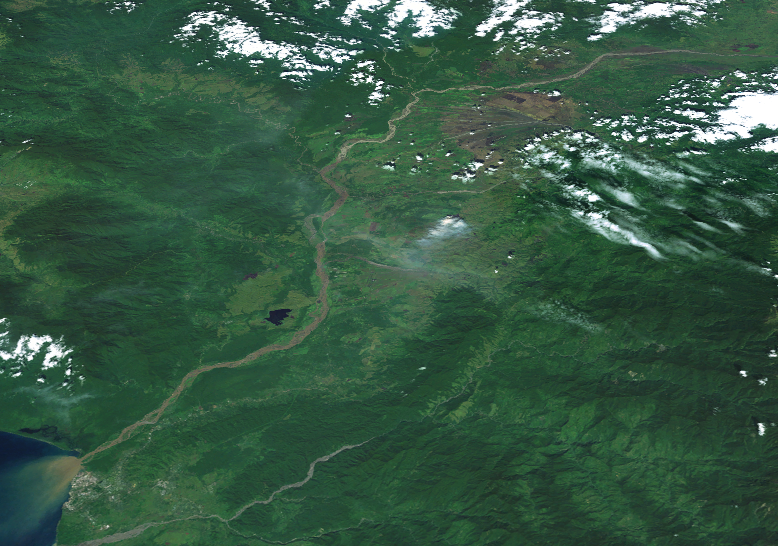
- The Markham in its entirety, looking due West from near its source, its river mouth in the lower left

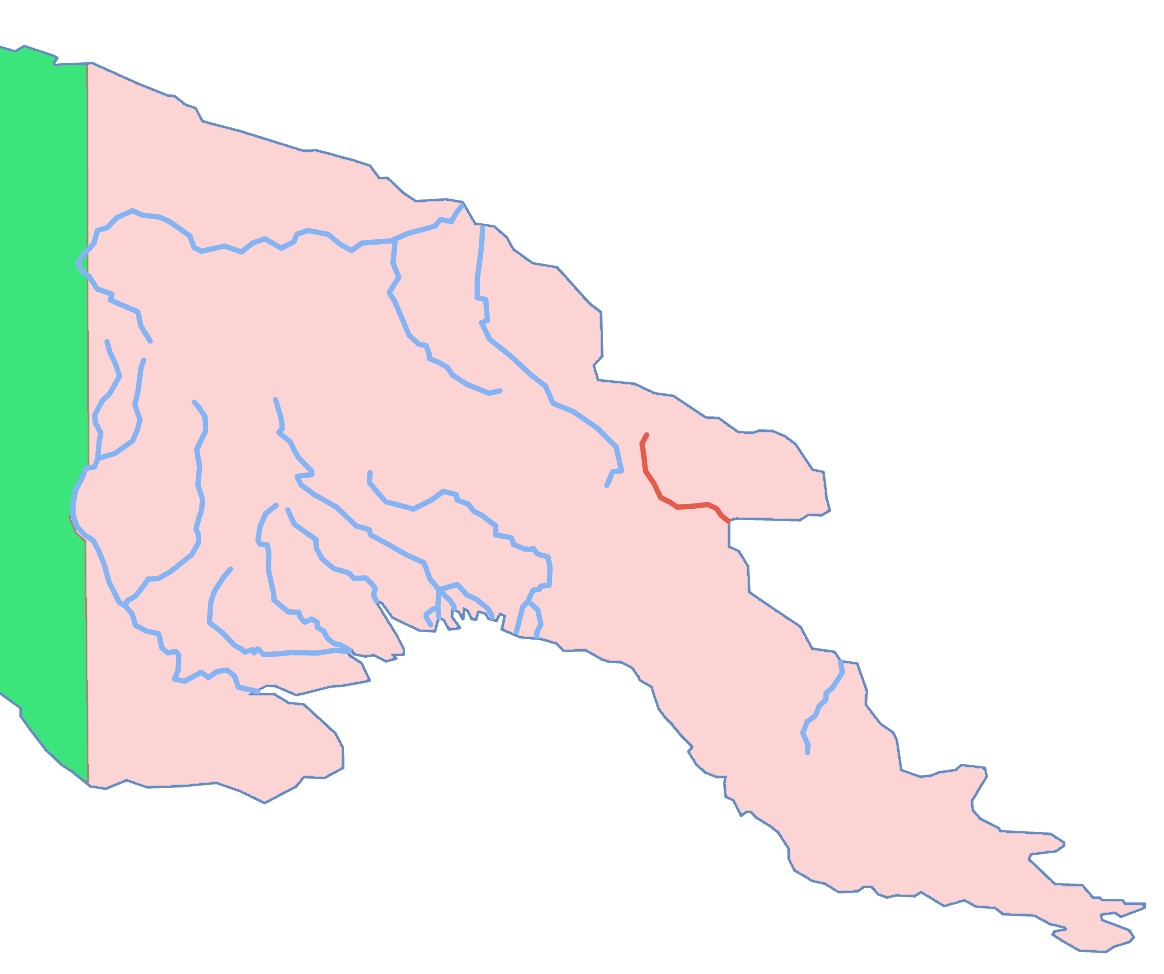
- Location of the Markham River

Location
- Country: Papua New Guinea

Physical characteristics
- Source: Confluence of Umi and Bitjia rivers
  - location: Finisterre Range
  - coordinates: 6°13′49.5372″S 146°10′59.2068″E
  - elevation: 350 m (1,150 ft)
- 2nd source: Umi River
  - coordinates: 5°59′47.9724″S 146°8′5.856″E
  - elevation: 760 m (2,490 ft)
- 3rd source: Bitjia River
  - coordinates: 6°2′24.4932″S 146°3′31.8024″E
  - elevation: 680 m (2,230 ft)
- Mouth
  - location: Huon Gulf
  - coordinates: 6°44′20″S 146°58′5″E
  - elevation: 0 m (0 ft)
- Length: 180 km (110 mi) (Markham–Umi 300 km)
- Basin size: 13,264 km^{2} (5,121 mi^{2})
- Discharge
  - location: Near mouth
  - average: 546 m^{3}/s (19,300 cu ft/s)
  - maximum: 4,000 m^{3}/s (140,000 cu ft/s)

Basin features
- Progression: Huon Gulf (Solomon Sea)
- River system: Markham River
- Tributaries
  - left: Umi, Mutsing, Gorambampam, Leron, Rumu, Erap
  - right: Bitjia, Wanton, Waffa, Watut, Wampit

The Markham River is a river in eastern Papua New Guinea. It originates in the Finisterre Range and flows for 180 km (110 mi) to empty into the Huon Gulf at Lae.

== Course ==
The Markham is a major river in eastern Papua New Guinea. Its headwaters (Umi and Bitjia) originate in the Finisterre Range. From their confluence, it flows swiftly southeast through steep mountains and empties into Huon Bay. Its wide (0.5–2 km) but shallow bed forms a series of braided channels through a large central depression, the Markham Valley. Its sparsely populated flat valley includes considerable agricultural land downstream (cocoa and groundnut plantations, cattle ranching). Its lower 70 km are navigable. Its largest tributary is the Watut River, which originates in the Bulolo Valley.

The river was named in 1873 by Captain John Moresby, R.N., in honour of Sir Clements Markham, then Secretary of the Royal Geographical Society. A single-lane steel bridge, 1690 feet long – by far the longest bridge built in Papua until that time – was opened in January 1955.

== Hydrology ==
The central part of the Markham Valley is dry (1,000–1,500 mm of rainfall), while the mountainous peripheries and the southern part of the valley receive more rainfall (up to 4,200 mm per year). The whole catchment receives an average of 2,100 mm of rainfall per year. This area is classified as Cwa and Af according to Köppen's climate classification. The river transports large quantities of sediment, 9–12 million tonnes per year.

== Tributaries ==
The main tributaries from the mouth:

| Left tributary | Right tributary | Length (km) | Basin size (km^{2}) | Average discharge (m^{3}/s) |
|---|---|---|---|---|
| Markham | | 300 | 12,766 | 546 |
| | Wampit | | 554.4 | 30.7 |
| Erap | | | 478.3 | 21.8 |
| Rumu | | | 377 | 16.6 |
| | Watut | | 5,405 | 221.6 |
| Leron | | | 1,111.6 | 60.1 |
| | Waffa | | 1,199.1 | 50.2 |
| Goram- bampam | | | 327.3 | 16.2 |
| Mutsing | | | 190 | 10.6 |
| | Wanton | | 362.4 | 15.3 |
| | Bitjia | | 401.7 | 19.6 |
| Umi | | 120 | 709.8 | 42.3 |

== See also ==
- List of rivers of Papua New Guinea
- List of rivers of Oceania
