= Kamula language =

Trans–New Guinea language

Kamula
- Wawoi
- Region: Western Province, Papua New Guinea
- Native speakers: (1,100 cited 2000)
- Language family: Trans–New Guinea or unclassified: Awin–Pa; Kamula

Language codes
- ISO 639-3: xla
- Glottolog: kamu1260
- ELP: Kamula
- Map: The Kamula language of New Guinea The Kamula language Other Trans–New Guinea languages Other Papuan languages Austronesian languages Uninhabited
- Coordinates: 6.951833°S 142.654804°E

Kamula (Kamira, Wawoi) is a Trans–New Guinea language that is unclassified within that family in the classification of Malcolm Ross (2005). Noting insufficient evidence, Pawley and Hammarström (2018) leave it as unclassified.

== Demographics ==
Kamula is spoken in two widely separated areas, including in Kamiyami village of the Wawoi Falls area in Bamu Rural LLG, Western Province, Papua New Guinea.

Routamaa (1994: 7) estimates that there are about 800 speakers of Kamula located in 3 villages in Western Province, with no dialectal differences reported. This is because the Kamula had originally lived in camps near Samokopa in the northern area, but a group had split off and moved to Wasapea in the south only around 50 years ago.

- Kesiki, at Wawoi Falls in Bamu Rural LLG (main village) (6.951833°S 142.654804°E)
- Samokopa in Bamu Rural LLG (one day's walk from Kesiki) (6.931064°S 142.746689°E)
- Wasapea (Kamiyami) in Gogodala Rural LLG (seven days' walk, or 90 km to the south of Kesiki) (7.889003°S 142.648998°E)

In the northern villages of Kesiki and Samokopa, Kamula children were reported as preferring to speak Doso over Kamula. A minority of Kamula people in the northern area also live in Dibiyaso-speaking villages, where they are multilingual in Kamula, Doso, and Dibiyaso. Kamula people in the southern village of Wasapea are also fluent in Gogodala.

== Classification ==
The little data that exists for Kamula pronouns does not fit in with the neighboring East Strickland or Bosavi languages (though 1sg nê likely reflects proto-TNG *na), so Kamula is best left as an unclassified language an independent branch of Trans–New Guinea pending further study.

Attested pronouns are 1sg nɛ̃, 2sg wɛ̃, and ̩pl diɛ.

== Phonology ==
Kamula phonology:

=== Consonants ===
Kamula has 12 consonants.

	Bilabial	Dental	Alveolar	Palatal	Velar	Glottal
plosive	p	t̪	d		k ɡ	
nasal	m		n			
fricative			s			h
approximant	w			j		
lateral approximant			l			

=== Vowels ===
Kamula has 7 vowels.

	Front	Central	Back
close	i		u
close-mid	e		o
open-mid	ɛ ⟨a꞉⟩		ɔ ⟨o꞉⟩
open		a	

== Vocabulary ==
The following basic vocabulary words are from Dutton (2010), Reesink (1976), and Shaw (1986), as cited in the Trans-New Guinea database:

gloss	Kamula
head	dokupala; tɔkɔnʌlʌ
hair	kokosasi; kɔkɔsʌse
ear	molo; mɔlɔ
eye	inʌma; inoma
nose	mu; mũ
tooth	ɛpe
tongue	te; tɛ
leg	ɛtɛ; hetei
louse	iyʌ; iya
dog	ɛsemala; esemʌlʌ
pig	ʌľiʌ
bird	tea
egg	temoko; temɔkɔ
blood	umali; umʌ:li
bone	ɛľu; ɛro
skin	kapala; kʌpʌlʌ
breast	mɛmɛ
tree	dali; tʌli
man	ɔpɔlʌimi; opřami
woman	eya; ɛ̃yã
sun	sali; sʌľi
moon	mama; mʌmʌ
water	yu
fire	deľʌpʌ; dřaƀa
stone	ewʌľʌ; yawařa
road, path	api
name	hi
eat	dampřoma; tʌɛdɔma
one	hatropɛ; hʌtɔlɔp
two	dapiamɛtɛ; depiʌmɛtɛ
