= Wassi Kussa River =

River in Papua New Guinea

Wassi Kussa River Chester River
- Location within Papua New Guinea

Location
- Country: Papua New Guinea
- Region: Western Province

Physical characteristics
- Source
  - location: Papua New Guinea
- Mouth: Arafura Sea
  - coordinates: 9°10′04″S 142°03′01″E
- Length: 33 km (21 mi)
- Basin size: 1,551.7 km^{2} (599.1 mi^{2})
- Discharge
  - location: Near mouth
  - average: 46.6 m^{3}/s (1,650 cu ft/s)

The Wassi Kussa River is a river in southwestern Papua New Guinea.

== See also ==
- List of rivers of Papua New Guinea
- Upper Wassi Kussa languages
