= Abede River =

River of southern central Papua New Guinea

Coordinates: 7°13′31″S 144°48′53″E

The Abede is a river of southern central Papua New Guinea. It flows into Deception Bay on the Gulf of Papua. The Abede River is a noted landmark on several tours around south-central Papua New Guinea.
