= Gum River =

River in Papua New Guinea

- Location within Papua New Guinea

Location
- Country: Papua New Guinea
- Region: Madang Province

Physical characteristics
- Source
  - location: Papua New Guinea
- Mouth
  - coordinates: 5°15′39″S 145°46′33″E

The Gum River is a river in Madang Province, Papua New Guinea.

The Gum languages are spoken in the area.

== See also ==
- List of rivers of Papua New Guinea
- Gum River languages
