= Veimauri River =

River in Papua New Guinea

Coordinates: 9°3′S 147°1′E

The Veimauri is a river of Papua New Guinea. It flows into Galley Reach of Redscar Bay to the north-west of Port Moresby. To the east of the mouth there are rubber and coconut plantations on the banks and the Veimauri River Bridge. The river area is protected under the Veimauri River Forest Reserve, which has a significant population of parrots.
