= Aemoi River =

River in Papua New Guinea

Coordinates: 4°56′0″S 151°40′0″E

The Aemoi is a river in East New Britain, Papua New Guinea. It runs down into Open Bay on the northwest coast, just south of Tonganda.
