= Karl Schneider (Austrian footballer) =

Austrian footballer

Personal information
- Date of birth: 16 December 1902

International career
Years	Team	Apps	(Gls)
1926–1928	Austria	8	(1)

Karl Schneider (born 16 December 1902, date of death unknown) was an Austrian footballer. He played in eight matches for the Austria national football team from 1926 to 1928.
