= Afai River =

River in Papua New Guinea

Coordinates: 9°26′27″S 148°17′3″E

The Afai is a river of south-eastern central Papua New Guinea. Namudi Airport lies along the river.
