= Gope board =

Papua New Guinean tribal art

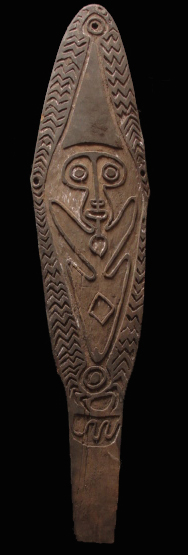
Gope board

A gope board (or kwoi) is a wooden ritual object made in the Papuan Gulf of New Guinea. Each board represents the spirit of an ancestral hero that can protect clans from evil spirits and death.

== Design ==
Gope is a term for a spiritually charged carved board made to represent an ancestral hero in the Papuan Gulf of Papua New Guinea. Papuan Gulf people of Kikori, Baimaru, Uruma, Hohao, and Orokolo refer to these sculptured boards as Kwoi.

The sculptures are often made from the sides of an old canoe.

== Use ==
Gope sculptures are believed to protect the island clansmen from evil spirits and death. A full size board is made and named by the uncle of a boy for his initiation (into adulthood) ceremony. Also, warriors are awarded gope boards for each act of bravery they perform in battle—these boards are often made from the remains of an enemy's canoe. Gope boards have a consistent elliptical shape and can vary in size up to eight feet long. They are carved in relief and then painted with lime (to whiten), red ochre, and other native paints. Gope boards have a similar style and may depict the face of an ancestral spirit. Small unnamed gope boards are sometimes given to uninitiated boys.

=== In headhunting ===
Gope boards are also used in raids on other clans and headhunting missions. They are consulted as to which enemy to attack, and the spirits contained in the boards are thought to go in advance of the warriors to sap the enemies of their strength. Agiba (or "skull racks") are similar to Gope boards and are used to display any skulls won in battle.
