= Kabenau River =

River in Papua New Guinea

Kebenau River

Location
- Country: Papua New Guinea
- Region: Madang Province

Physical characteristics
- Source
  - location: Papua New Guinea
- Mouth
  - location: near Rimba to the Astrolabe Bay

Kabenau River (also known as Gabina or St. Augustin River) is a river in Madang Province, Papua New Guinea. It is located at about 5.466667°S 145.85°E. It was discovered in 1887 by German geologist Karl Schneider and explored in 1888 by Hugo Zöller. It flows westward and empties near Rimba to the Astrolabe Bay.

== See also ==
- Kabenau River languages
