= Atara River =

River in Papua New Guinea

Coordinates: 6°41′14″S 155°47′37″E

The Atara River is a river on southeastern Bougainville Island.

It is located within the Autonomous Region of Bougainville, in northeastern Papua New Guinea.

It flows into the Solomon Sea, to the north of Shortland Island.
