= Lumis River =

River in Papua New Guinea

Coordinates: 2°41′S 150°58′E

The Lumis is a river of north-western New Ireland, Papua New Guinea. The name was proposed by Stewart and Sandy in 1986.
