= Kaukomba River =

Kaukomba Kaukombar
- The Kaukomba River in PNG

Physical characteristics
- Source: Kukumba River
  - coordinates: 4.44157°S 145.24709°E
  - elevation: 51 m
- Mouth: Toto River
  - location: Papua New Guinea, Madang Province
  - coordinates: 4.41352°S 145.26991°E
  - elevation: 18 m

The Kaukomba River (also known as Kaukomba, Kokumba or Kukumba) is a small river in Madang Province, Papua New Guinea. It joins Jabab Creek to form the Toto River, which flows into the ocean just east of the village of Asuramba. The river is located approximately 600 km from Port Moresby.

== See also ==
- Kaukombar River languages
