= Dyke Ackland Bay =

Bay in Papua New Guinea

Coordinates: 9°00′S 148°45′E

Dyke Ackland Bay is a large bay in the Oro Province of Papua New Guinea. The bay extends from Cape Nelson to Cape Ward Hunt. Porlock Bay and Oro Bay are some of the smaller bays located within the larger bay.

The bay was named by Captain John Moresby after his friend Thomas Dyke Acland.
