= Karl Schneider (philologist) =

German philologist

- Born: 18 April 1912; Dierdorf, Germany
- Died: 28 March 1985 (aged 81); Münster, Germany

Academic background
- Education: University of Giessen

Academic work
- Discipline: Germanic philology
- Sub-discipline: English philology
- Institutions: English literature; University of Münster
- Main interests: Runology

Karl Schneider (18 April 1912 – 26 December 1998) was a German philologist who specialized in Germanic studies.

== Biography ==
Karl Schneider was born in Dierdorf, Germany on 18 April 1912. From 1932 to 1936 he studied English, German, comparative linguistics, Romance studies and philosophy at the University of Giessen. He received his Ph.D. in comparative linguistics at Giessen in 1936 with a thesis on Germanic languages.

Schneider completed his habilitation at the University of Marburg in 1951 with a thesis on runes. He subsequently served as a lecturer at Marburg. Schneider later transferred to the University of Münster, where he served as assistant professor (?-1954), associate professor (1957-1969) and professor of English philology (1959-1977), and Director of the English Department. From 1965 to 1966, Schneider was Dean of the Faculty of Philosophy at the University of Münster. Schneider's research centered on English philology, Germanic studies and Indo-European studies.

Schneider retired from the University of Münster in 1977. He died in Münster on 26 December 1998.

== Sources ==
- Kürschners Deutscher Gelehrtenkalender 1992. De Gruyter, Berlin 1992, ISBN 3-11-011754-1.
