= Kokun River =

River in Papua New Guinea

Kokun River Kokon River, Kokan River
- Location within Papua New Guinea

Location
- Country: Papua New Guinea
- Region: Madang Province

Physical characteristics
- Source
  - location: Papua New Guinea
- Mouth
  - coordinates: 5°16′25″S 145°38′24″E

The Kokun River, also spelled Kokon River or Kokan River, is a river in Madang Province, Papua New Guinea.

The Kokan languages, Girawa and Kein (Bemal), are spoken in the area.

== See also ==
- List of rivers of Papua New Guinea
- Kokun River languages
