= Atob River =

River in Papua New Guinea

Coordinates: 3°27′58″S 142°57′33″E

Location
- Country: Papua New Guinea
- Region: East Sepik Province

Physical characteristics
- Source
  - location: northern Papua New Guinea

The Atob is a river of northern Papua New Guinea, flowing to the west of Wewak. The river has been affected by mining in the region with alluvial deposits.
