= Siki River =

River in Papua New Guinea

Coordinates: 6°29′S 147°51′E

Location
- Country: Papua New Guinea
- Region: Morobe Province

Physical characteristics
- Source
  - location: Papua New Guinea

The Siki River is a river located in the Morobe Province of Papua New Guinea.
