= Apmi River =

Coordinates: 5°54′50″S 149°10′37″E

- Location of mouth

Location
- Country: Papua New Guinea
- Island: New Britain

The Apmi is a river of central western New Britain, in Papua New Guinea.
