= Johanna River (New Britain) =

River in Papua New Guinea

Coordinates: 6°16′5″S 150°0′8″E

The Johanna, also known as the Aomo, is a river of south-western New Britain. It flows into the sea near Aivet Island.
