= Girua River =

River in Papua New Guinea

Coordinates: 8°40′S 148°24′E

Girua River Gira River

Location
- Country: Papua New Guinea
- Region: Oro Province

Physical characteristics
- Source
  - location: Papua New Guinea

The Girua River is a river located in the Oro Province of Papua New Guinea. Alluvial gold was discovered in the river late in the 19th century. By 1898, about 150 miners were working on the Gira and Mambare rivers.
