= Ateltem River =

Papuan river

Coordinates: 4°53′S 141°9′E

The Ateltem is a river of central Papua, in western central Papua New Guinea near the border with Indonesia. It is at an altitude of around 1,404 metres (4,606 ft).
