= Lossuk River =

River in Papua New Guinea

Coordinates: 2°45′S 151°04′E

The Lossuk is a river of north-western New Ireland, Papua New Guinea. The sedimentation and mineral deposits of the river was studied in the mid 1980s.
