= Gogol River =

River in Papua New Guinea

Location
- Country: Papua New Guinea
- Region: Madang Province

Physical characteristics
- Source
  - location: Papua New Guinea
- Mouth
  - location: Astrolabe Bay
  - coordinates: 5.316667°S 145.75°E

The Gogol River is a river in Madang Province, Papua New Guinea. It empties to Astrolabe Bay at 5.316667°S 145.75°E.

== See also ==
- North Gogol River languages
- South Gogol River languages
