= Watut River =

River in Papua New Guinea

Coordinates: 6°39′S 146°32′E

Location
- Country: Papua New Guinea
- Region: Morobe Province

Physical characteristics
- Source
  - location: Papua New Guinea
- Mouth
  - location: Markham River

The Watut River is a river in Morobe Province, Papua New Guinea, a tributary of the Markham River. It is known as rough river full of canyons and over 150 rapids, making it suitable for adventurous white-water rafting.

In May 2005 three Israeli tourists died when attempting to raft down the river. The river had been swollen from heavy rains causing it to be more dangerous than usual. Eight Israelis and the Papua New Guinean guide survived the tragedy.

== See also ==
- Watut Rural LLG
