= Malas River =

River in Papua New Guinea

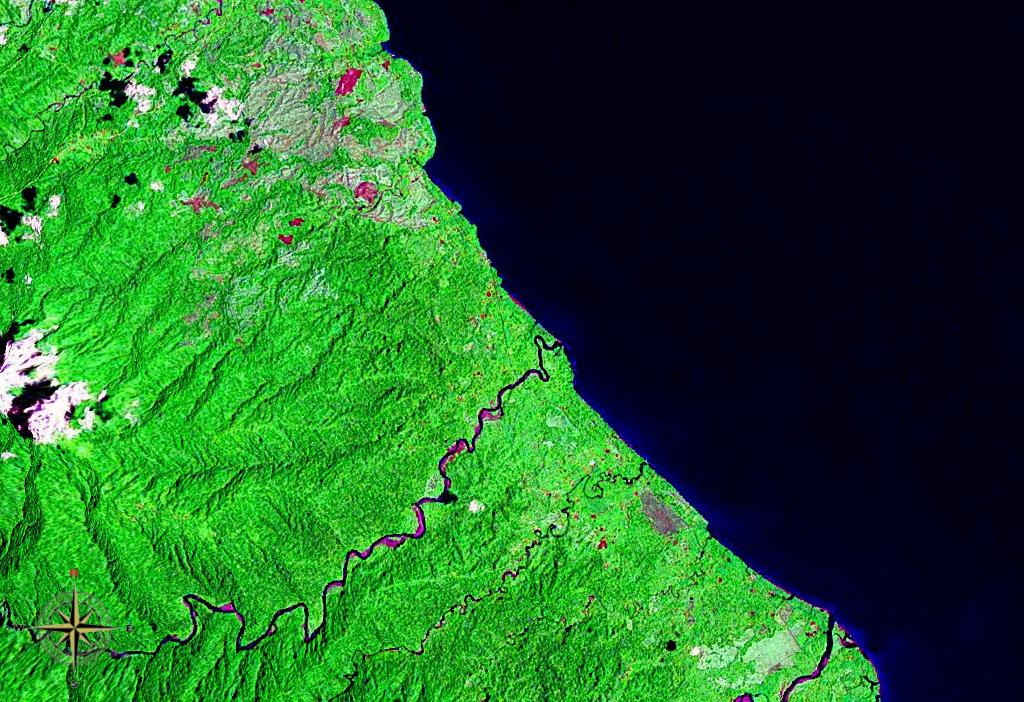
- Malas River seen from space (false color)

Location
- Country: Papua New Guinea
- Region: Madang Province

Physical characteristics
- Source
  - location: Papua New Guinea
- Mouth
  - location: Bismarck Sea
  - coordinates: 4.6666667°S 145.5833333°E

Malas River is a river in Madang Province, Papua New Guinea. It rises in the Adelbert Range and empties to the Bismarck Sea at 4.6666667°S 145.5833333°E.

== See also ==
- Malas language
