= Balima River (Papua New Guinea) =

River in New Britain, Papua New Guinea

Coordinates: 5°09′S 151°05′E

The Balima is a river of New Britain, Papua New Guinea. It enters the sea about five miles from Cape Koas. One of its tributaries is the Bumba Stream.
