= Gulf of Papua =

Region on the south coast of New Guinea

Coordinates: 9°0′S 145°0′E

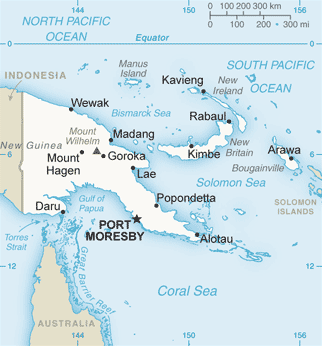
Papua New Guinea.

The Gulf of Papua is located in the southern coast region of New Guinea. It has a total surface area of 70,400 km^{2} (27,200 sq mi).

== Geography ==
Some of New Guinea's largest rivers, such as the Fly River, Turama River, Kikori River, Purari River, and Wawoi River flow into the gulf, making it a large delta. While the western coast is characterized by swampy tidal waterways, land to the east ending at Cape Possession is flat and sandy.

The Papuan Gulf's central and eastern interior slowly rises to meet the mountainous Southern Highlands and is covered in a variety of inland swamps and dense tropical hardwood forests. The western interior possesses a large region of limestone karst. The dry season begins in October and extends to February, after which the wet season starts.

The southern border of the gulf is defined as a line from the southwestern corner of the Fly River Delta in the west, to Cape Suckling 355 km east of this, which is 70 km northwest of Port Moresby. This encloses a sea area of approximately 35,000 km². The Gulf of Papua forms a broad shelf with a maximum width of about 150 km between the shelf break, at about 140 m water depth, and the Fly Delta. It narrows to less than 20 km east of the Purari River delta. In the southwest, the Gulf adjoins the broad, shallow Torres Strait shelf, at the northeastern tip of Australia.

The Gulf of Papua shelf can be divided into four geomorphic zones: a low-relief, inner-shelf, deltaic zone; a high-relief, mid- to outer-shelf incised valley zone; a high-relief, southern reef zone; and a moderate to low-relief mid- to outer shelf zone in the east and northeast. The deltaic zone is an extensive flat, shallow surface in 5–30 m water depth. It is bordered by a relatively steep delta region in 20–50 m of water, that extends along the coast between the tide-dominated Fly and wave-dominated Purari River mouths. The incised valley zone has a complex, offshore-onshore-trending seafloor topography on the middle to outer shelf between 50 m and 100 m water depth. Evidence suggests that the largest of these valleys formed by erosive tidal currents during the Pleistocene when the sea level was about 30–50 m below its present position. The reef zone is a complex of barrier and patch reefs south of 9° 30' lat., the bathymetry is rugged near steep-sided coral reefs which locally may have vertical sides. Between the reefs, however, the shelf is a mostly flat and featureless surface with water depths of 20–50 m. Water depths increase rapidly to the east of the Great Barrier Reef, which is located on the shelf margin of the Coral Sea basin in water 120–140 m deep. The moderate- to low-relief mid- to outer shelf zone lies north of the incised valleys and offshore from the deltaic zone. Although the 60 m to 80 m isobaths suggest the existence of east-west trending valleys, these are much lower in relief than those to the south. Generally, this zone forms a low-relief plain, gently dipping towards the shelf break which is in about 140 m of water. A drowned barrier reef system forms a rim near the shelf break along the southeastern part of the Gulf.

== Demographics and economy ==
Communities inhabiting the Papuan Gulf primarily live in both villages on the shore or coastal mangrove forests, as well as in key regional centers (Kikori, Baimuru, Ihu, Kerema, and Malalaua). These semi-urban centers are where the health services are located, as well as high schools, and large trade stores. The provincial government of the Gulf Province, which administers the bulk of the Papuan Gulf, is located in Kerema. As a result of the services available in these centers, they are all composed of a mixture of Papuan Gulf ethnic groups.

Since the 1950s, people of the Gulf of Papua have been migrating to Papua New Guinea's national capital Port Moresby to find work. As a result of these demographic shifts, Port Moresby is home to a sizable community of Papuan Gulf residents. They are located primarily in the settlements of Kaugere, Kila Kila, and Horse Camp. Gulf Communities have access to a regional air service that connects them to the wider nation.

A sealed road links communities near Malalaua to Port Moresby. When not washed out a dirt road connects Kerema to Malalaua. Despite this infrastructure, the primary means of travel remains canoes and fiber-glass dinghies with outboard motors. Within the Purari Delta and among the Elema it is common for individuals, particularly men, to travel to Port Moresby at least once a year to see relatives and to earn money.

Today, people primarily rely on fishing and hunting, sago palms, and depending on the area agriculture and horticulture. Communities in the eastern Gulf (Toaripi and Elema), where the soil is elevated have large gardens. Communities (Purari, Urama, Gope, Goaribari, Kerewa) in the west have small inland gardens and tend to focus their cultivation efforts on a variety of fruit and nut-bearing trees.

Since the early 1990s, communities of the Papuan Gulf have experienced intensive localized development by multinational companies in search of oil and revenue found in the region's tropical hardwood forest. With the development of the Kutubu oil project in the Southern Highlands, an oil pipeline now stretches from the oil wells to an offshore oil terminal in the Gulf of Papua.

Since the mid-1990s, several logging camps have been established, several of which are operated by the Malaysian company Rimbunan Hijau. Communities whose land and water resources are being impacted by these projects receive some monetary compensation through royalty payments. As a result, impacted communities now can purchase rice, tinned fish, kerosene, etc. The long-term social and environmental impacts of these resource extraction projects have yet to be assessed.

== Cultural history ==
The diverse set of cultural groups that inhabit this region possess some loose cultural affinities. The majority speak non-Austronesian languages and possess patrilineal descent systems. Communities are organized based on tribal and clan boundaries. While these boundaries have remained intact over time, Gulf communities do now intermarry within the region and with outside ethnic groups.

During the region's early colonial period (1880–1920), communities became renowned in Europe for their large-scale longhouses and their fantastic artworks. In the Purari Delta, the Purari constructed buildings with facades of 80 feet, which then tapered down along a central ridge pole of 120 feet. In contrast, the Goaribari, who occupied the mouth of the Omati and Kikori Rivers, possessed longhouses that were uniform in height (20 feet) and reached lengths of 600 feet. While communities in the east (the Purari, Elema, and Toaripi) no longer construct these buildings, it is still possible to find longhouses among Urama, Gope, and Era River communities. These buildings were where many of the region's incredible ritual arts were made and stored.

Rituals such as headhunting and cannibalism were common in the Gulf of Papua before foreign contact. These rituals included displays of magic powers and the initiation of young men. An integral part of these rituals is tribal art. This art is mostly made of wood and is carved in relief and painted with local dyes of red ochre, lime, and coal. Examples of this art are sculptures, masks, bullroarers, and gope.

Several authors, namely the British anthropologist Alfred Haddon (1920) and the art historian Douglas Newton (1961), have noted similarities between the Papuan Gulf's various art forms with that of groups living along the Sepik River. Based on these formal similarities they have suggested the possibility of a cultural link between the two areas. However, to date, no scholarly research has confirmed such a linkage, and it remains a speculation based on stylistic similarities.
