= Kumusi River =

River in Papua New Guinea

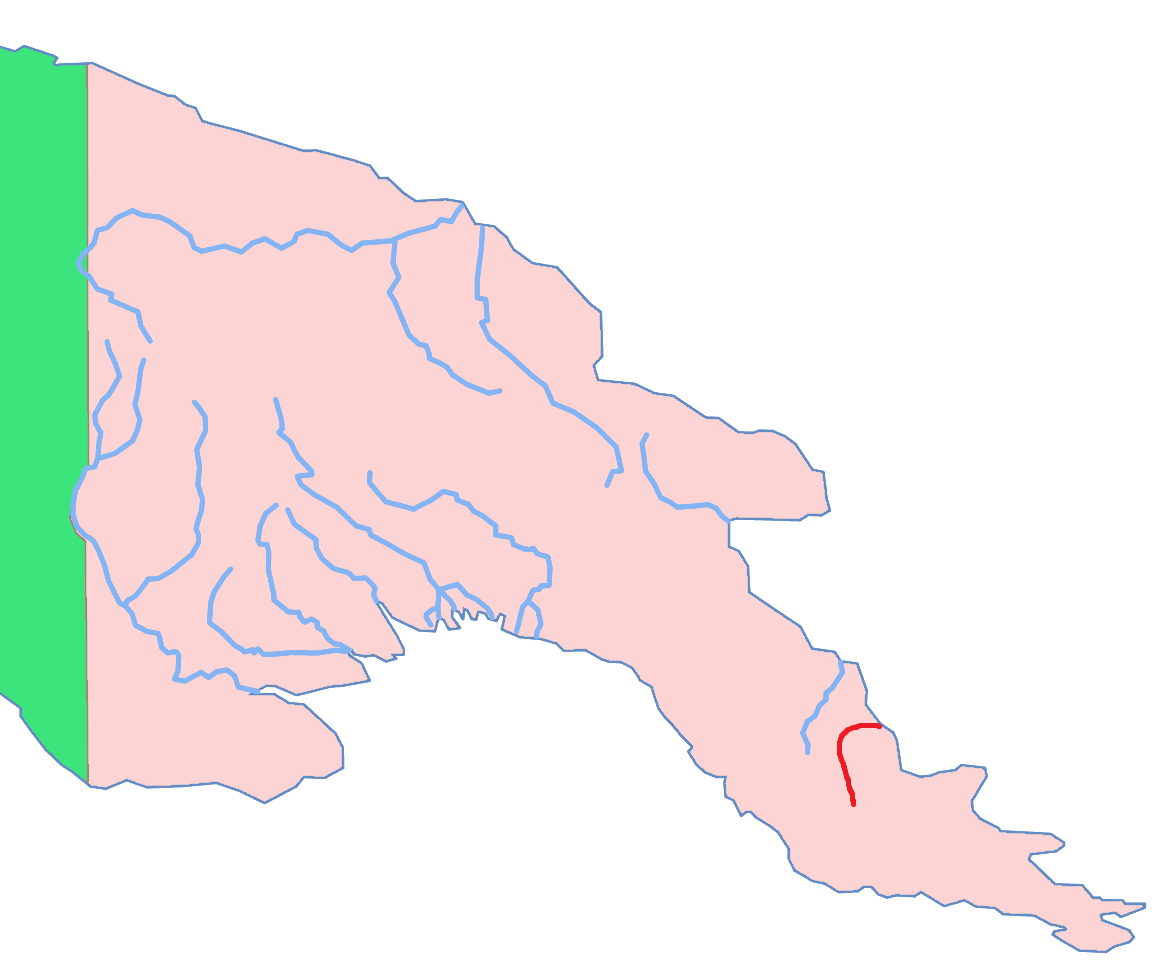
Location of the Kumusi River in Papua-New Guinea. Coordinates: 8.5°S 148.233333°E

The Kumusi River (also known as the Kamusi River) is a river located in the Oro Province of Papua New Guinea. Known for its width and its strength, the Kumusi has had a significant impact on the history of the Oro Province. It was a significant factor in the Kokoda Track Campaign and also a contributing factor to the destruction caused by Cyclone Guba.

== History ==
=== World War II ===
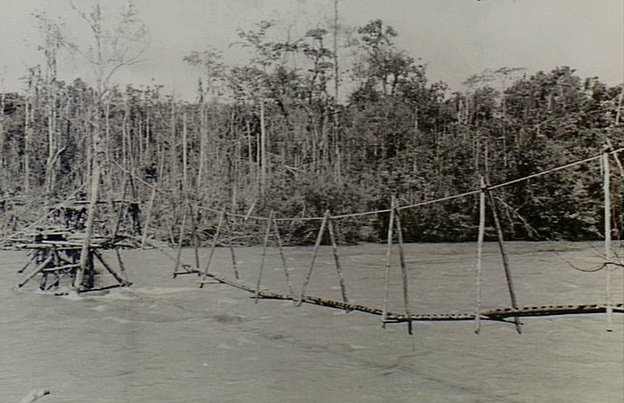
Kumusi River Crossing at Wairopi

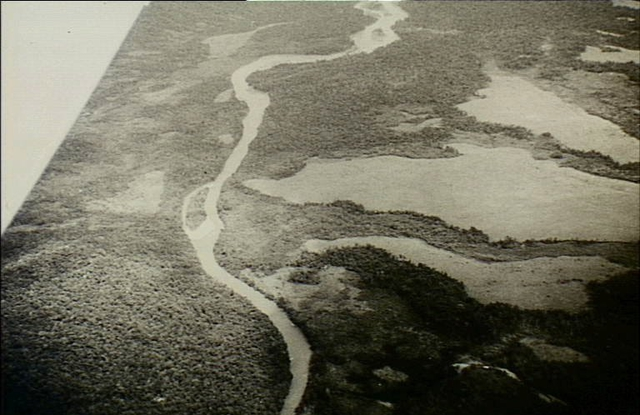
Aerial view of Kumusi River

Due to its relative proximity to the Kokoda Track, the Kumusi River was often a factor in the Kokoda Track Campaign of World War II. The fast flowing and wide river provided natural barrier from enemy, and gave the soldiers a distinct advantage. There were few bridges, the solid ones were often bombed to break a supply line. Soldiers often had to walk, or use rafts through the powerful current in order to get across Many fatalities were recorded as the current overwhelmed the soldiers. One of the most notable deaths was that of Japanese Major General Tomitaro Horii. After the Oivi-Gorari battle, the Japanese chaotically crossed the river at Wairopi. Although his horse already had drowned, Horii opted to try to cross on a raft. He soon fell into the water and drowned.

=== Cyclone Guba ===
On 14 and 15 November 2007, Cyclone Guba hit the Oro Province. The Cyclone brought five days of solid rain, causing widespread flooding; the Kumusi swelled to ten times its original width. The flooding destroyed homes, gardens and in some cases, entire villages were washed away. The flooding completely destroyed the provinces vital infrastructure, over twenty-two bridges were washed away, cutting the link to Popondetta. Of the twenty-two, the Kumusi Bridge, a large steel structure was destroyed, with estimated rebuilding costs at K70 million. A replacement bridge funded by the Australian government opened in 2016.

http://www.looppng.com/content/pm-officially-open-kumusi-bridge
