= Jaba River =

River in Papua New Guinea

Jaba River is a river in Bougainville, Papua New Guinea. It empties to Empress Augusta Bay at 6.3833333°S 155.2166667°E. It was polluted by waste from the Panguna mine, which specialized in copper. The aquatic life of Jaba river was destroyed due to heavy metal pollution. The environmental pollution of river was one of the causes of armed conflict on the island and struggle of local people for independence.
