= Warangoi River =

River in Papua New Guinea

Coordinates: 4°29′27″S 152°10′43″E

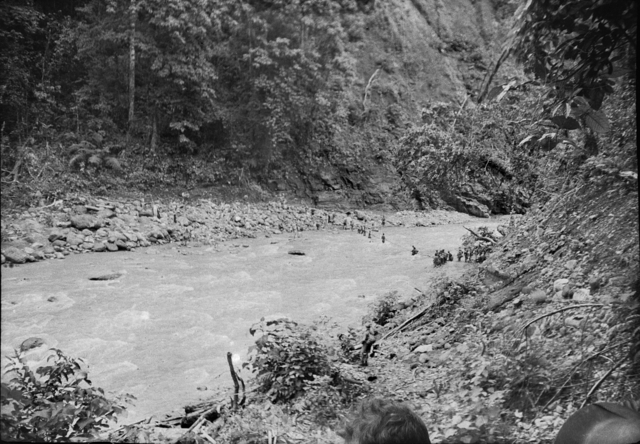

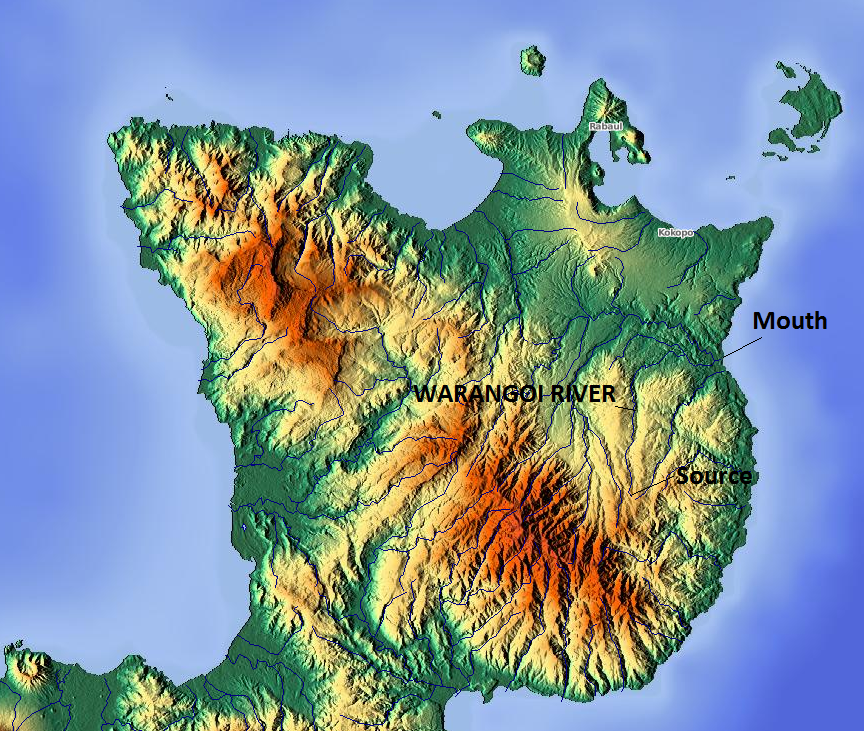

The Warangoi River also known as the Adler River, is a river located in the eastern part of the Gazelle Peninsula in the north-eastern part of New Britain, Papua New Guinea. It flows past the village of Warangoi and out into the Warangoi Bay. It played a part in the Battle of Rabaul early in 1942. Lieutenant Colonel Ishiro Kuwada's men of the 3rd Infantry Battalion captured at least 200 Australian men between the Warangoi River and Vunakanau. Virgin rainforest lies along the river basin.
