= Ogon River =

River in Papua New Guinea

Coordinates: 5°04′S 142°05′E

The Ogon River is a river located in Sanduan Province, Papua New Guinea. It is at an elevation of 2,707 meters above sea level.
