= Vanapa River =

River in Papua New Guinea

Coordinates: 9°5′S 146°58′E

The Vanapa is a river of Papua New Guinea. It flows into Galley Reach of Redscar Bay to the north-west of Port Moresby.
