= Aroa River (Papua New Guinea) =

River in Papua New Guinea

Coordinates: 9°4′S 146°48′E

The Aroa is a river of Papua New Guinea. It flows into the sea in the northern end of Redscar Bay, about 11 miles from Cape Suckling, to the north-west of Port Moresby. 1.75 metres (5 ft 9 in) to the south are the Kekeni Rocks, reaching a height of 21 metres (69 ft)
