= Mambare River =

River in Papua New Guinea

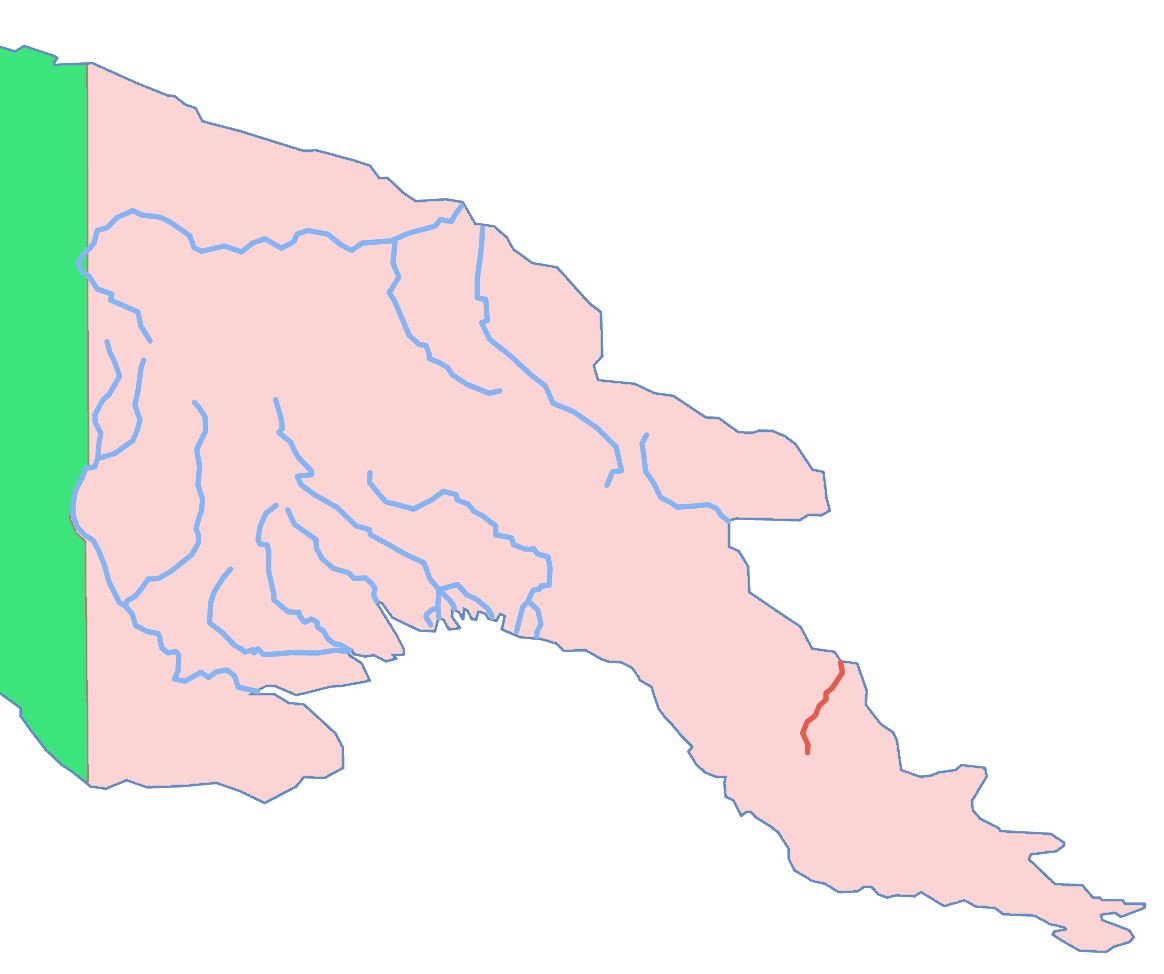
Location of the Mambare River

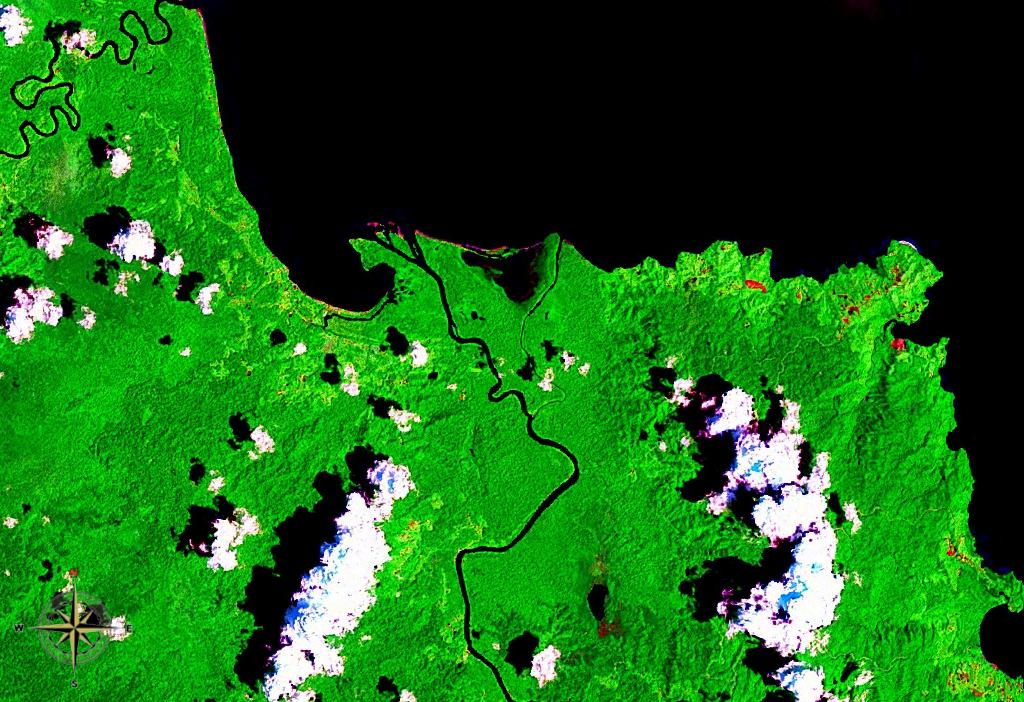
Mambare River entering the sea, seen from space (false color).

Mambare River is a river in Oro Province, Papua New Guinea, located at 8.05°S 148.0333333°E.

== History ==
Alluvial gold was discovered in the river at the end of the 19th century. By 1898 there were 150 miners working on the Mambare and Girua Rivers.

The Imperial Japanese had a supply dump located at the mouth of the Mambare River during World War II.
