= Wawoi River =

River in Papua New Guinea

Coordinates: 7.7962°S 143.2610°E

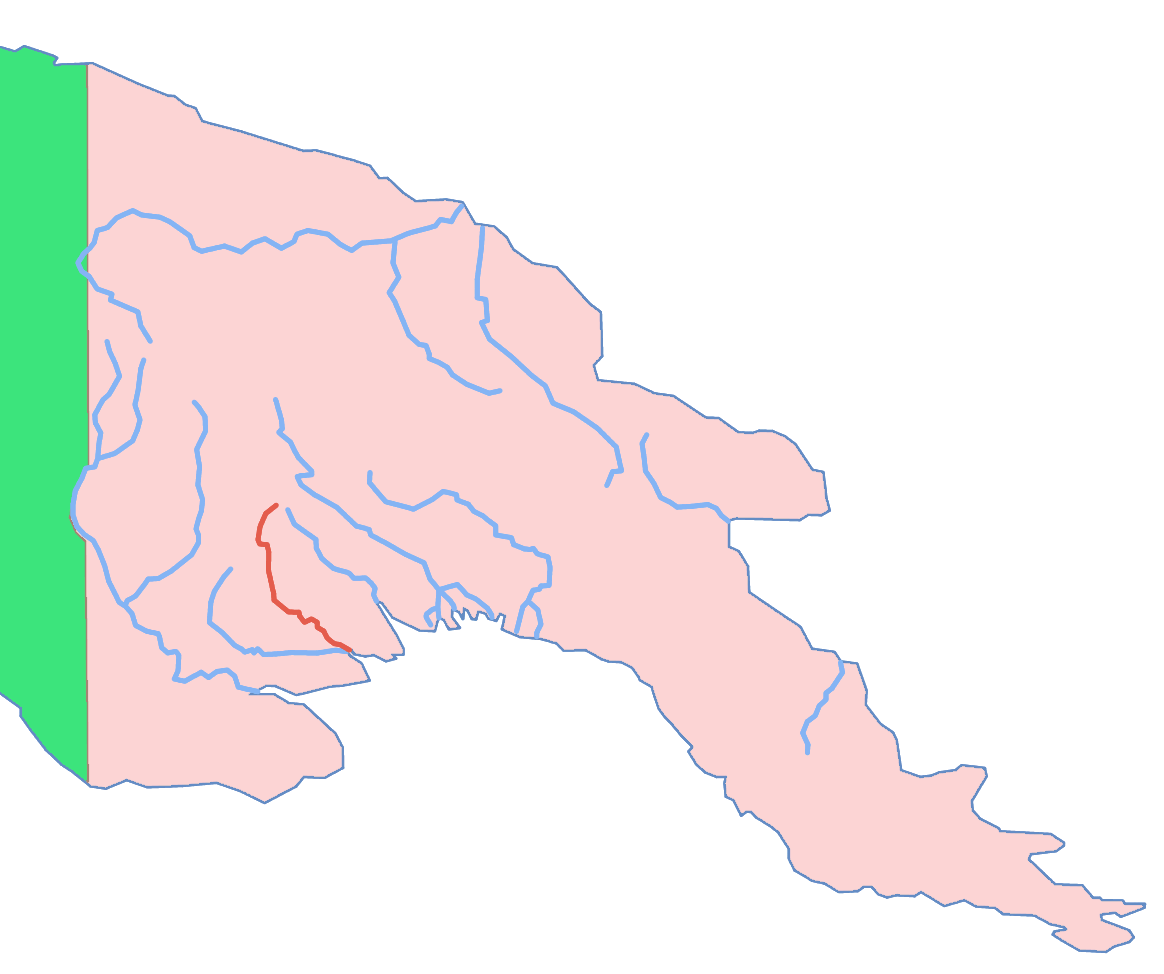
location

Wawoi River is a river located in Western Province, Papua New Guinea. With a total length of 482 km (300 mi), mean annual discharge of 2,000 m^{3}/s (71,000 cu ft/s) and has a drainage basin of 18,171 km^{2} (7,016 sq mi) its source is located in Mount Bosavi and flows southeast into the Gulf of Papua. The river is home to fish species such as barramundi and catfish. The surrounding landscape is also home to a variety of fauna such as Rusa deer, wallabies, wild pigs, crocodiles and various lizards.

The estimated terrain elevation above sea level is 1 m (3.3 ft).
