= Tyas =

Tyas may refer to:

- Edward Tyas Cook (1857–1919), English journalist, biographer, and man of letters
- John Tyas (1833–1903), English-Australian linguist, bibliophile and University of Adelaide registrar
- Sean Tyas (born 1979), American DJ and electronic music producer

== See also ==
- Tya (disambiguation)
