= Sirva language =

Madang language of Papua New Guinea

Sirva
- Sileibi
- Native to: Papua New Guinea
- Region: Madang Province
- Native speakers: (260 cited 1981)
- Language family: Trans–New Guinea: Madang; Southern Adelbert; Sogeram; Sikan; Sirva

Language codes
- ISO 639-3: sbq
- Glottolog: sile1255
- ELP: Sirva

Sirva, or Sileibi, is a Papuan language of Madang Province, Papua New Guinea.

== Phonology ==
=== Vowels ===
	Front	Central	Back
Close	i	ɨ	u
Mid	e		o
Open		a	
