= Magɨyi language =

Papuan language

Magɨyi
- Native to: Papua New Guinea
- Region: Madang Province, Middle Ramu District, Vguvɨndɨ village
- Language family: Trans–New Guinea: Madang; Southern Adelbert; Sogeram; Sikan?; Magɨyi

Language codes
- ISO 639-3: gmg
- Glottolog: magi1244

Magɨyi is a Papuan language of Madang Province, Papua New Guinea. It was first identified in 2012.

== Vocabulary ==
gloss	Magɨyi
betel nut	akusa-ɣa
sago	maꞵa-ɣa
taro	aŋgɨnɨ-ɣa
