= Kaikovu language =

Kaikovu may be:

- Sinsauru language (Claassen & McElhanon)
- Kesawai language (SIL)
