= Aisi =

Aisi or AISI may refer to:

== Organizations ==
- African Information Society Initiative of UNECA
- Agenzia Informazioni e Sicurezza Interna, the internal intelligence agency of Italy
- Alberta Initiative for School Improvement, Canada
- American Iron and Steel Institute, an American trade organization
- Artificial intelligence safety institute, a type of research body
  - AI Security Institute, a British government body

== Other uses ==
- Aisi language, Papua New Guinea
- Hazaaron Khwaishein Aisi, 2003 Indian film
- Robert Guba Aisi, Papua New Guinean diplomat
