= Utarmbung language =

Madang language spoken in Papua New Guinea

Osum
- Utarmbung
- Native to: Papua New Guinea
- Region: Madang Province
- Native speakers: 1,200 (2003)
- Language family: Trans–New Guinea: Madang; Southern Adelbert; Tomul River / Josephstaal; Osum

Language codes
- ISO 639-3: omo
- Glottolog: utar1238

Osum, also known as Utarmbung, is a divergent Madang language of the Adelbert Range of Papua New Guinea.
