= Mum language =

Papuan language of Papua New Guinea

Mum
- Katiati
- Native to: Papua New Guinea
- Region: Madang Province
- Native speakers: 2,500 (2015)
- Language family: Trans–New Guinea: Madang; Southern Adelbert; Sogeram; Sikan; Mum

Language codes
- ISO 639-3: kqa
- Glottolog: mumm1238

Mum, or Katiati, is a Papuan language of Madang Province, Papua New Guinea.

== Phonology ==
=== Vowels ===
	Front	Central	Back
Close	i	ɨ	u
Mid	(e)		
Open		a	
