= Tai language (New Guinea) =

Kalam language spoken in Papua New Guinea

Tai
- Tay
- Ti
- Native to: Papua New Guinea
- Region: Madang Province
- Native speakers: (900 cited 1990)
- Language family: Trans–New Guinea: Madang; Rai Coast–Kalam; Kalam; Tai

Language codes
- ISO 639-3: taw
- Glottolog: taii1241

Tai (Tay, Ti) is a Kalam language of Papua New Guinea, spoken in a single village.
