= Sogeram =

Sogeram may refer to:

- the Sogeram River of Papua New Guinea
- the Sogeram languages, named after the river
