= Wadaginam language =

Madang language spoken in Papua New Guinea

Wadaginam
- Native to: Papua New Guinea
- Region: Madang Province
- Native speakers: 950 (2003)
- Language family: Trans–New Guinea: Madang; Southern Adelbert; Tomul River / Josephstaal; Wadaginam

Language codes
- ISO 639-3: wdg
- Glottolog: wada1263

Wadaginam is a divergent Madang language of the Adelbert Range of Papua New Guinea.
