= Yafi =

Yafi may refer to:

- Yafa'a (Arabic: يافع, romanized: Yāfiʿ), a tribe and region in Yemen
- Yafa an-Naseriyye, a town in Israel
- Jaffa (Levantine Arabic: يَافَا, romanized: Yāfi), an ancient port city in Palestine
- Abdallah El-Yafi, Lebanese politician
- Yafi language, a language spoken in Western New Guinea
