= YNL =

YNL or ynl may refer to:

- Points North Landing Airport, Saskatchewan, Canada, IATA airport code YNL
- Yangulam language, in Papua New Guinea, ISO 639-3 code ynl
