= Magi language =

Magi may refer to one of two Papuan languages of Papua New Guinea:

- Magi language (Central Province), a Mailuan language
- Magi language (Madang Province), a Madang language
