= Mand language =

Sogeram language spoken in Papua New Guinea

Mand
- Atemble
- Native to: Papua New Guinea
- Region: Madang Province
- Native speakers: 8 (2015)
- Language family: Trans–New Guinea: Madang; Southern Adelbert; Sogeram; West; Mand

Language codes
- ISO 639-3: ate
- Glottolog: atem1241
- ELP: Mand
- Mand is classified as Critically Endangered by the UNESCO Atlas of the World's Languages in Danger.
- Coordinates: 5.092351°S 144.774735°E

Mand, or Atemble, is a Papuan language of Madang Province, Papua New Guinea.

It is spoken in Atemble village (5.092351°S 144.774735°E) of Arabaka Rural LLG.

== Phonology ==
=== Vowels ===
	Front	Central	Back
Close	i	ɨ	u
Mid	e	(ə)	o
Open		a	
