= Brahman languages =

Hypothetical family of languages

Brahman
- (Biyom–Tauya)
- Geographic distribution: Brahman, Papua New Guinea
- Linguistic classification: Madang: Rai Coast; Brahman – Peka River; Brahman

Language codes
- Glottolog: None

The Brahman languages, Biyom and Tauya, form a subbranch of the Rai Coast branch of the Madang languages of Papua New Guinea. The family is named after the cattle station and town of Brahman, which lies between the territories of the two languages.

== Genetic relations ==
John Z'graggen (1971, 1975) classified four languages as Brahman, Biyom, Faita, Isabi, Tauya.

Ross (2005) broke up Brahman, placing Faita among the Sogeram languages (another sub-branch of Madang) and Isabi among the unrelated Goroka languages – a position followed by Usher (2018).
