= Astrothelium pseudodissimulum =

Scientific classification
- Kingdom: Fungi
- Division: Ascomycota
- Class: Dothideomycetes
- Order: Trypetheliales
- Family: Trypetheliaceae
- Genus: Astrothelium
- Species: A. pseudodissimulum

Binomial name
- Astrothelium pseudodissimulum Aptroot (2016)

Species of lichen

Astrothelium pseudodissimulum is a species of corticolous (bark-dwelling), crustose lichen in the family Trypetheliaceae. Found in Papua New Guinea, it was formally described as a new species in 2016 by Dutch lichenologist André Aptroot. The type specimen was collected by Harrie Sipman in Brahman Mission (Madang Province) at an altitude of 100 m (330 ft); there, it was found in a rainforest growing on smooth tree bark. The lichen has a smooth, pale yellowish-green thallus with a cortex but lacking a prothallus. It covers areas of up to 15 cm (6 in) in diameter. The only lichen product detected in collected samples of the lichen using thin-layer chromatography was an anthraquinone. The combination of characteristics of the lichen that distinguish it from others in Astrothelium are its inspersed hamathecium; pigment in the medulla that reacts K+ (red); and the pseudostromatic form of the ascomata, with whitish-coloured, erumpent to prominent pseudostromata.
