= URG (disambiguation) =

URG may refer to:

- Epidermal growth factor, EGF, a protein that stimulates cell growth and differentiation (human EGF: urogastrone, initially)
- urg, the ISO 639-3 code for Urigina language
- Ruben Berta International Airport, the IATA code URG
- Uruguaiana Station, the station code URG
- Air Urga, the ICAO code URG
- University of Rio Grande, a university and community college in Ohio, U.S.
