= Magɨ language =

Papuan language of Madang Province, PNG

Magɨ
- Magi
- Native to: Papua New Guinea
- Region: Madang Province
- Native speakers: 50 (2016)
- Language family: Trans–New Guinea: Madang; West Madang; Southern Adelbert; Sogeram; East Sogeram; Aisian; Magɨ

Language codes
- ISO 639-3: gkd
- Glottolog: magi1243

Magɨ is a moribund Papuan language of Madang Province, Papua New Guinea. It was discovered in 2012. It is spoken in the village of Wanang, which hosts a field site belonging to the New Guinea Binatang Research Center.

Magɨ is most closely related to the Aisi language, with which it forms an Aisian subgroup within the Sogeram branch.

== Vocabulary ==
Below is a 100-item Swadesh list comparing Magɨ and Aisi, from Daniels (2016).

no.	gloss	Magɨ	Aisi	cognate?
1	I	yɨ	ya	yes
2	thou	na	na	yes
3	we	arɨ	anɨ	yes?
4	this	naku	naku	yes
5	that	araku	araku	yes
6	who	nɨŋe	ninɨ	yes?
7	what	ai	ai	yes
8	no	magɨ	mabɨŋ	no
10	many	mugum	maŋgima	no
11	one	pabra	pabra	yes
12	two	agrenda	agrenda	yes
13	big	kuŋar	kuŋar	yes
14	long	garaŋ	garaŋ	yes
15	small	anɨmɨnɨ	anɨmɨnɨ	yes
16	woman	abi	abi	yes
17	man	kur	kuru	yes
19	fish	kyaŋɨ	kyaŋɨ	yes
20	bird	kapɨ	kapɨ	yes
21	dog	api	apɨr	yes
22	louse	imaŋ	imu	yes?
23	tree	te	tar	yes
24	seed	kɨsɨr	kɨsɨr	yes
25	leaf	tewad	taŋar	no
26	root	kɨnam	kɨrɨr	no
28	skin	sɨgɨd (dɨb < Aisi)	dɨbɨ	yes?
29	flesh	kisɨkɨ	kɨsɨkɨ	yes
30	blood	igam	igam	yes
31	bone	kañaŋ	dagar	no
32	grease	sɨraŋ	sɨrɨ	yes?
33	egg	kimbi	anoŋ	no
35	tail	kwarɨ	kwarɨ	yes
37	hair	sisi	arɨ	no
38	head	katam	katam	yes
39	ear	duwag	dugag	yes?
40	eye	tamɨ	tamɨ	yes
41	nose	mumukatam	mumu	yes
42	mouth	sɨmbɨkatam	sumboi	yes?
43	tooth	makɨ	makɨ	yes
44	tongue	migin	sagwi	no
46	foot	aŋgɨ	aŋgɨ	yes
47	knee	kugad	koge	yes?
48	hand	kɨmɨb	kumob	yes
49	belly	kɨtɨm	kumu	no
50	neck	sakum	nagum	no
51	breasts	amɨ	amɨ	yes
53	liver	mapɨm	umbaŋ	no
55	eat	n-	n-	yes
56	bite	is-	is-	yes
57	see	tɨmbr-	tɨmbr-	yes
58	hear	ir-	ir-	yes?
60	sleep	ambɨt kɨn-	aŋgɨn-	no
61	die	kum-	kum-	yes
62	kill	iw-	iw-	yes
63	swim	aŋ sud-	aŋ sor-	yes
64	fly	pug-	brɨr am-	no?
65	walk	kr-	kr-	yes
66	come	ye-	wi-	no
68	sit	mɨŋga kɨn-	kɨnɨgam-	no
69	stand	dugwa pam-	togapam-	yes?
70	give	igw-	igw-	yes
71	say	s-	u-	no
72	sun	wayaŋ	wayaŋ	yes
73	moon	irɨna	irina	yes
74	star	tindɨ	tendɨ	yes
75	water	aŋ	aŋ	yes
76	rain	aŋ	am	no?
77	stone	gwande	gwande	yes
78	sand	misab	upo	no
79	earth	bi	ur	yes
80	cloud	kamɨ	kamo	yes
81	smoke	apɨs	pɨsɨ	yes
82	fire	ab	ab	yes
83	ash	ibur	ibɨr	yes
84	burn	tu-	tu-	yes
85	path	kɨb	kɨb	yes
86	mountain	param	ware	no
90	white	kikɨ	mor, niŋ	no
91	black	griŋ	greŋ	yes
92	night	umɨnda	urakɨr	no
94	cold	karu	kɨbur	no
95	full	mɨtate	yakarate	no
96	new	arɨm?	kikɨ	no?
97	good	upɨnaŋ	urunda	no
99	dry	ginaŋ	genaŋ	yes
100	name	ib	ib	yes

== Sources ==
- Field research on the Magɨ language. Includes grammar descriptions and examples of words and sentences.
