= Apali language =

Papuan language of Papua New Guinea

Apalɨ
- Emerum
- Munga
- Native to: Papua New Guinea
- Region: Madang Province
- Native speakers: 980 (2003)
- Language family: Trans–New Guinea: Madang; Southern Adelbert; Sogeram; Central; Apalɨ

Language codes
- ISO 639-3: ena
- Glottolog: apal1256

Apalɨ (Apal), or Emerum, is a Papuan language of Madang Province, Papua New Guinea. Akɨ and Acɨ are two dialects that are quite different from each other.

== Phonology ==
=== Vowels ===
Apalɨ vowels
	Front	Central	Back
Close	i	ɨ	u
Mid	e		o
Open		a	

== Evolution ==
Below are some reflexes of proto-Trans-New Guinea proposed by Pawley (2012).

Sources abbreviations

- (W) = Wade (n.d.), Akɨ dialect
- (Z) = Z’graggen (1980), Acɨ dialect

proto-Trans-New Guinea	Apalɨ
*maŋgV ‘compact round object’	maŋgɨ ‘egg’
*mapVn ‘liver’	mapɨn
*maŋgat[a] ‘teeth, mouth’	mɨka
*mVkVm ‘jaw’	mukum
*(m,mb)elak ‘light, lightning’	(Osum and Paynamar mira, Moresada merak)
*kumV- ‘die’	kɨm-
*k(o,u)ma(n,ŋ)[V] ‘neck, nape’	(sa)kum ‘nape’
*iman ‘louse’	iman
*na- ‘eat’	n
pMadang *na ‘2SG free pronoun’	nama (cf. also na- ‘2SG POSS’)
pMadang *nu ‘3SG free pronoun’	numbu (cf. also nu- ‘3SG POSS’)
*nVŋg- ‘know, hear, see’	iŋg- (some other S Adelbert languages have niŋg-)
*kambena ‘arm’	human
*kin(i,u)- ‘sleep’	(?) hɨni- ‘be, stay, exist’
*[w]ani ‘who?’	ani
*(s,nd)umu(n,t)[V] ‘hair’	(?) mɨnɨ
*mapVn ‘liver’	maßɨn
*iman ‘louse’	iman
*takVn[V] ‘moon’	(Acɨ dial.) takun (Z), (Akɨ dial.) lakun (W)
*sa(ŋg,k)asiŋ ‘sand’	kasɨŋ (Z)
*mb(i,u)t(i,u)C ‘fingernail’	tɨpi (metath.) (Z)
*imbi ‘name’	imbi (W)
*[ka]tumba(C) ‘short’	tɨmbɨ (W)
*si(mb,p)at[V] ‘saliva’	sɨmbu ‘spit’
*simbil[VC] ‘navel’	(Akɨ) simbilɨm, (Acɨ) cimbilɨm ‘placenta, navel, umbilical cord’ (W)
*si(m,mb)(i,u) + modifier ‘buttocks’	susum ‘lower buttocks’
*kambena ‘arm, forearm’	human (W)
*mapVn ‘liver’	maβɨn (W)
*apa ‘father’	iaβaŋ (W)
*apus[i]‘grandparent’	aβe ‘grandmother’
*apa(pa)ta ‘butterfly’	(?) afafaŋ (Z)
*ka(nd,t)(e,i)kV ‘ear’	hinji (W)
*kindil ‘root’	hɨnjɨlɨ (W)
*[ka]tumba(C) ‘short’	tɨmbɨ (W, Z)
*takVn[V] ‘moon’	(Acɨ dial.) takun (Z)
*takVn[V] ‘moon’	lakun (W)
*kumut, *tumuk ‘thunder’	lɨmbɨ(lami) ‘to thunder’
*mb(i,u)t(i,u)C ‘fingernail’	tɨpi (metath.) (Z)
*kit(i,u) ‘leg’	gɨtɨ (Z)
*kutV(mb,p)(a,u)[C] ‘long’	(Akɨ) hutaŋ (W), (Acɨ) kutes (Z)
*si(mb,p)at[V] ‘saliva’	sɨmbu ‘spit’
*maŋgat[a] ‘teeth, mouth’	mɨka (W)
*si(mb,p)at[V] ‘saliva’	sɨmbu ‘spit’
*simb(i,u) ‘guts’	su ‘faeces’
*simbil[VC] ‘navel’	(Akɨ) simbilɨm, (Acɨ) cimbilɨm (both W)
*si(m,mb)(i,u) + modifier ‘buttocks’	susum (W)
*sa(ŋg,k)asiŋ ‘sand’	kasɨŋ (Z)
*maŋgV ‘compact round object’	maŋgɨ ‘egg’
*nVŋg- ‘know, hear, see’	i ŋg- ‘see’
*maŋgat[a] ‘teeth, mouth’	mɨka (W)
*kumV- ‘die’	kɨm- ‘die’
*k(o,u)ma(n,ŋ)[V] ‘neck, nape’	(sa)kum ‘nape’
*kambena ‘arm’	human (W)
*kindil ‘root’	hɨnjɨlɨ (W) (cf. gɨndrɨ ‘root’
*ka(nd,t)(e,i)kV ‘ear’	hɨnji (W)
*kin(i,u)- ‘sleep, lie down’	hɨni- ‘be, stay, exist’
*kutV(mb,p)(a,u)[C] ‘long’	hutaŋ (W)
*kumV- ‘die’	hɨmi- (W)
*kit(i,u) ‘leg’	gɨtɨ (Z)
*mVkVm ‘cheek’	(Acɨ) mukum (W), Akɨ mɨhum (W)
*takVn[V] ‘moon’	lakun (W)
*ka(nd,t)(e,i)kV ‘ear’	hɨnji (W)
*tumuk ‘to thunder’	(?) lɨmbɨ(lami) (W)
*kindil ‘root’	hɨndɨlɨ (W) (Z. gives gundru)
