= Faita =

Faita may be:

- Faita language
- FAITA
