= Airlines PNG Flight 1600 =

2011 aviation accident in Papua New Guinea

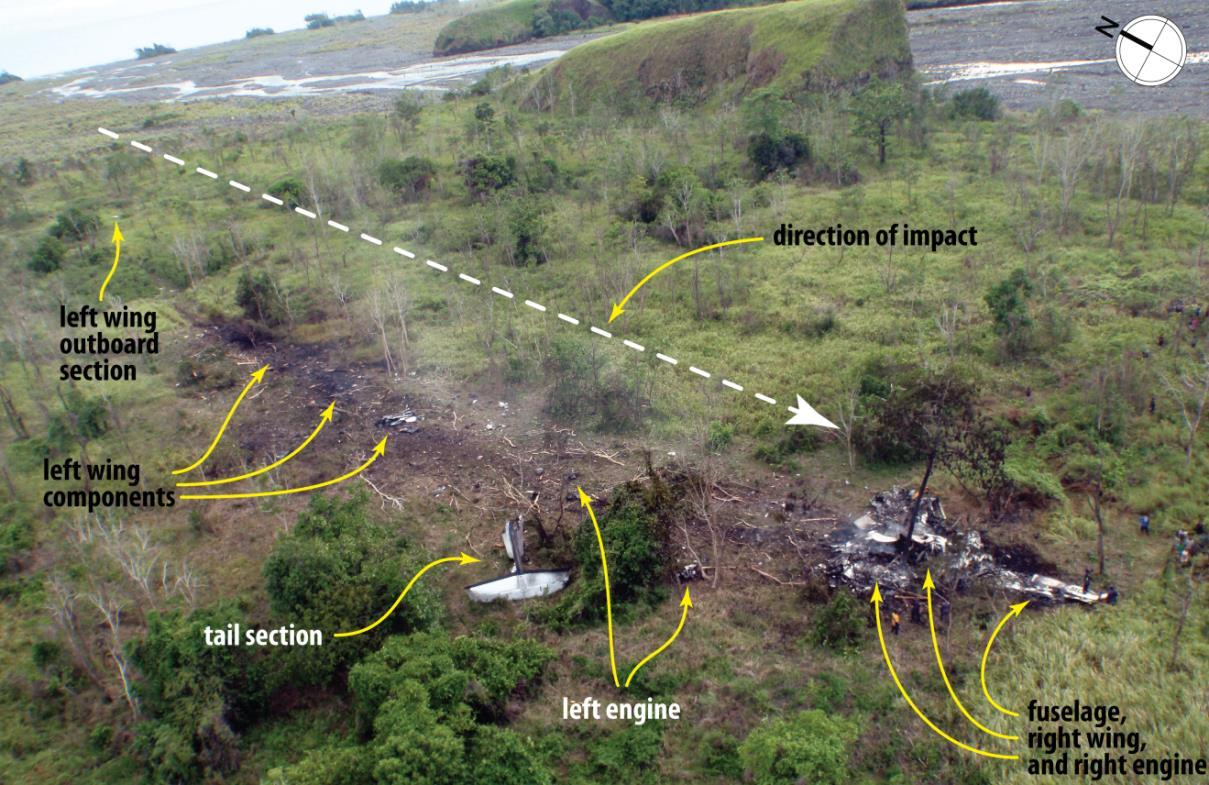
- Aerial view of the crash site

Accident
- Date: 13 October 2011
- Summary: Forced landing following dual propeller failure
- Site: 35 km south of Madang Airport, Papua New Guinea; 5°30′32″S 145°53′47″E

Aircraft
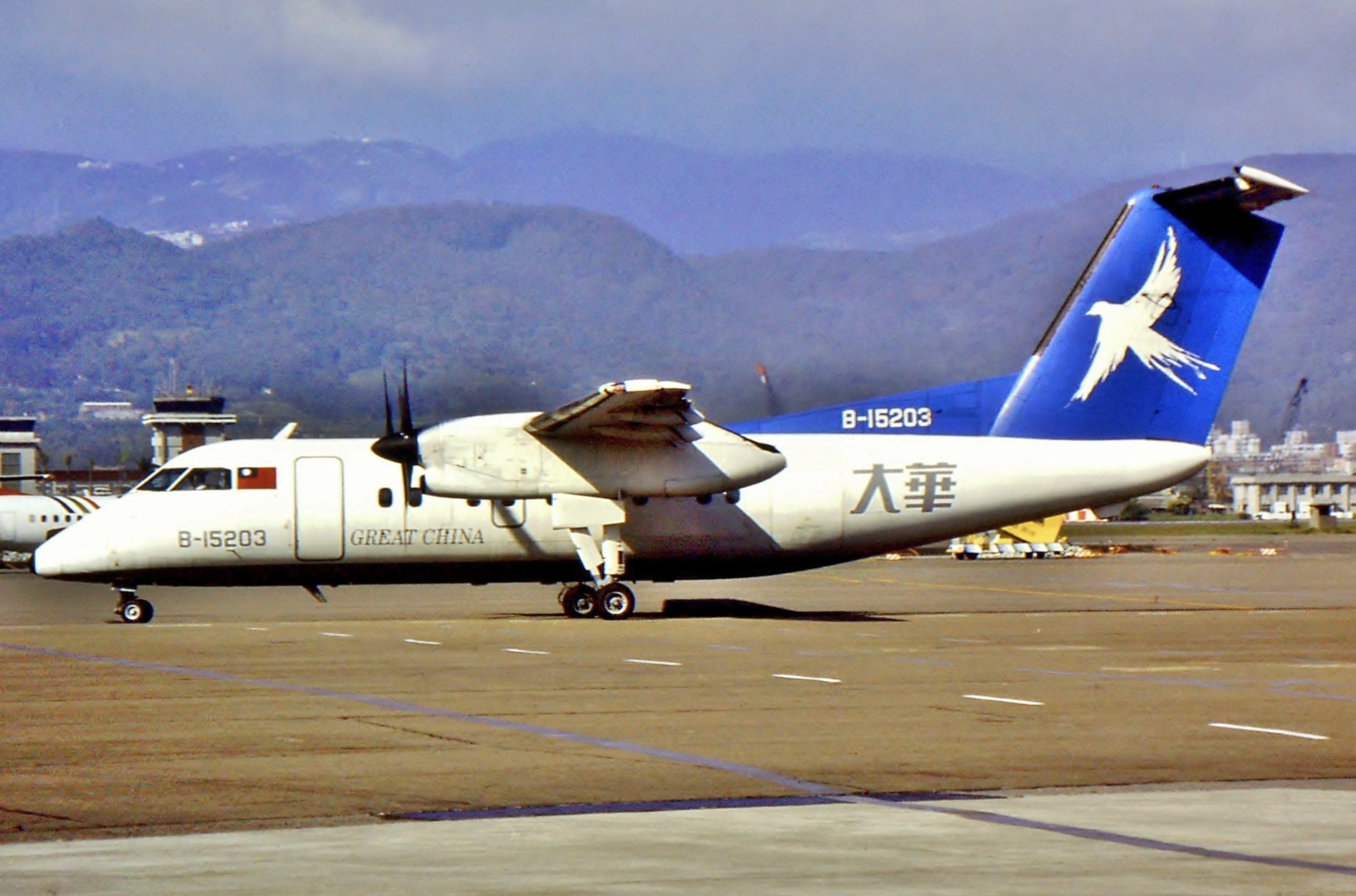
- The aircraft involved in the accident, while still in service with Great China Airlines in 1994
- Aircraft type: de Havilland Canada DHC-8-103
- Operator: Airlines PNG
- IATA flight No.: CG1600
- ICAO flight No.: TOK1600
- Call sign: BALUS 1600
- Registration: P2-MCJ
- Flight origin: Lae Nadzab Airport, Papua New Guinea
- Destination: Madang Airport, Papua New Guinea
- Occupants: 32
- Passengers: 29
- Crew: 3
- Fatalities: 28
- Injuries: 4
- Survivors: 4

On 13 October 2011, Airlines PNG Flight 1600, a Dash 8 regional aircraft on a domestic flight from Lae to Madang, Papua New Guinea, crash-landed in a forested area near the mouth of the Guabe River, after losing all engine power. Only 4 of the 32 people on board survived. It is the second-deadliest plane crash in the history of Papua New Guinea, behind a Lockheed L-14 crash, with 37 fatalities.

The subsequent investigation found that the flight crew retarded the throttle levers below the lowest position allowable in flight (known as flight idle), causing both propellers to overspeed and leading to a complete loss of engine power. A 'beta lockout' mechanism that would have prevented the overspeed even in case of erroneous power lever setting was available but not installed on the accident aircraft. Installation of such a mechanism became subsequently mandatory on all DHC-8 aircraft worldwide. The investigation also found that, once the overspeed occurred, the pilots failed to follow any of the applicable emergency procedures, causing the plane to quickly descend, crashing in four minutes, as compared to more than nine minutes and gliding an additional 35 km towards the airport, that the procedures would have given.

== Accident ==
On the afternoon of 13 October 2011, the Airlines PNG Dash 8 was conducting a regular public transport flight from Lae Nadzab Airport, to Madang Airport. On board were two flight crew, a flight attendant, and 29 passengers.

External videos
- P2-MCJ accident flight animation

The plane departed from Nadzab at 16:47 local time. The captain, 64-year-old Australian William "Bill" Spencer, had logged 18,200 hours of flying experience, of which 500 were on the Dash 8. The first officer was 40-year-old New Zealander Campbell Wagstaff, with 2,725 hours logged, of which 390 were on the Dash 8. Spencer was the handling pilot. The aircraft climbed to 16,000 feet (4,877 m) with an estimated arrival time at Madang of 17:17. Once in the cruise, the flight crew diverted right of the flight planned track to avoid thunderstorms and cloud.

The planned route required a steep descent into Madang and, although the aircraft was descending steeply, the propellers were left at their cruise setting of 900 rpm, causing the airspeed to increase. Neither pilot noticed the airspeed increasing towards the maximum operating speed (VMO); as they were "distracted by the weather." When the aircraft reached VMO as it passed through 10,500 feet (3,200 m), with a rate of descent between 3,500 and 4,200 feet per minute (1,100 and 1,300 m/min), the VMO overspeed warning sounded.

Spencer asked Wagstaff to decrease the propeller speed to 1,050 rpm to slow the aircraft down. He raised the nose of the aircraft in response to the warning and this reduced the rate of descent to about 2,000 feet per minute (610 m/min), however, the VMO overspeed warning continued.

=== Propeller overspeed ===
Wagstaff recalled Spencer moving the power levers back "quite quickly." Shortly after the power levers had been moved back, both propellers oversped simultaneously, exceeding by over 60% their maximum permitted speed of 1,200 rpm and seriously damaging both engines. The noise in the cockpit became deafening, rendering communication between the pilots extremely difficult, and internal damage to the engines caused smoke to enter the cockpit and cabin through the air conditioning system.

The emergency caught both pilots by surprise. There was confusion and shock on the flight deck. About four seconds after the double propeller overspeed began, the beta warning horn started to sound intermittently, although the pilots stated afterwards they did not hear it.

The left propeller speed reduced to 900 rpm (in the governing range) after about 10 seconds, before overspeeding again. During this second overspeed, the left engine compressor speed increased above 110% of its nominal value, suffering severe damage. Almost simultaneously, the right propeller went into uncommanded feather due to a malfunctioning beta switch in the propeller control unit, while the engine was still running at flight idle. Wagstaff then told Spencer that the right engine had shut down. He then asked to Spencer if the left engine was still working. Spencer replied that it was not working. Both pilots then agreed that they had "nothing."

On the order of Spencer, Wagstaff made a mayday call to Madang Tower and gave the aircraft's co-ordinates. However, instead of checking emergency checklists and procedures, their attention turned to where they were going to make a forced landing.

The aircraft crash-landed near the banks of the Guabe River tail-first at 114 knots (211 km/h; 131 mph), with flaps and landing gear retracted. During the impact sequence, the left wing and tail became detached.

The wreckage came to rest 300 metres (984 ft; 328 yd) from the initial impact point and was engulfed by fire. The front of the aircraft fractured behind the cockpit and came to rest inverted. Of the 32 occupants of the aircraft, only the two pilots, the only flight attendant, and one passenger out of 29 survived.

== Aircraft ==
The aircraft involved was a de Havilland Canada DHC-8-103, MSN 125, registered as P2-MCJ, that was manufactured by de Havilland Canada in 1988. It had logged 38421.3 airframe hours and 48093 takeoff and landing cycles and was equipped with two Pratt & Whitney Canada PW121 engines.

== Passengers ==
The plane was carrying 29 passengers, mostly Papua New Guineans, with one reported to be a Malaysian-Chinese national, who was the only surviving passenger. Most of the passengers were parents trying to attend thanksgiving ceremonies ahead of their children’s graduation at Divine Word University in Madang.

== Investigation ==
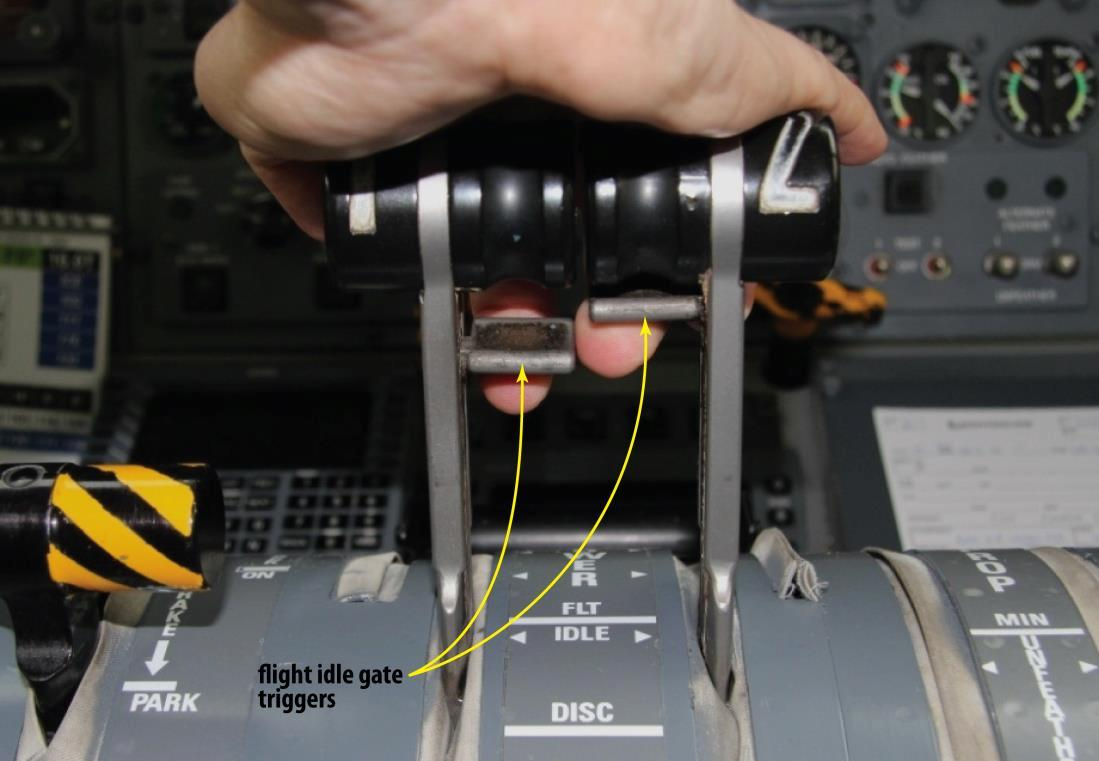
The power levers of the DHC-8 with the flight idle gate switches in the closed (left) and open positions

An investigation was carried out by the Accident Investigation Commission of Papua New Guinea (AIC) with assistance from the Australian Transport Safety Bureau. The final report was issued on 15 June 2014. The AIC found that the pilot in command pulled the power levers beyond the flight idle gate and into the ground beta range, while attempting to slow the aircraft down during descent in bad weather. Ground beta (the propeller's reverse pitch range) should only be used for decelerating or reversing on the ground, as in flight it can cause uncontrollable propeller overspeed and damage to the engines.

The mechanism that alerts pilots that they are selecting beta range had been the subject of previous investigations and it was found that a manufacturer-approved service centre had a history of releasing defective parts back to operators.

Following a number of previous incidents of inadvertent selection of Ground Beta range on Dash 8 aircraft that resulted in serious damage to engines, the U.S. Federal Aviation Administration mandated that an additional safeguard was required to be fitted to aircraft operated by American airlines. This system, called a Beta Lockout, was developed by the manufacturer and completely prevents inadvertent selection of Ground Beta range while airborne at high speeds, but operators outside the U.S. were not notified or required to fit the modification. The report also found that the crew had to deal with an overspeed of both propellers that caused large amounts of drag making the aircraft extremely difficult to control and that there was significant noise caused by the propeller tips exceeding the speed of sound and also smoke in the cockpit and cabin due to the damage to the engines and bleed air system.

The report criticised the pilots for their failures during the 4 minutes and 18 seconds following the double propeller overspeed, during which:

… the crew … did not follow any sequence of standard emergency response procedures, such as actioning Phase 1 items or QRH procedures. This decreased the likelihood of them dealing effectively with a very difficult and challenging emergency situation. As a result, the crew did not feather the windmilling left propeller until … 3 minutes and 6 seconds after the overspeeds began. The windmilling propeller had the effect of increasing the aircraft's rate of descent, as well as adding to aircraft controllability problem. … If we assume the aircraft had been slowed – as required by the propeller overspeed emergency procedure … this would have allowed it to remain airborne for over nine minutes and to glide 18.9 nautical miles or 35 km.

== Aftermath ==
After the crash, Airlines PNG decided to ground its entire fleet of 12 Dash 8s pending investigation. It also quarantined a fuel depot at Lae Nadzab Airport from which the crashed aircraft was refuelled before departing on the accident flight.

Following release of the initial accident findings, Airlines PNG added the Beta Lockout mechanism as a modification to all their Dash 8s, preventing the inadvertent selection of Ground Beta in flight. Subsequently, Transport Canada in conjunction with the aircraft manufacturer released an airworthiness directive making it a mandatory requirement that all operators worldwide make these modifications.

On 14 October 2015, 4th anniversary of the crash, a candlelight memorial was held at Divine Word University in Madang, as most of the victims were parents attending their children's Graduation Day. The memorial service was attended by staff and students from the university.

== In popular culture ==
The crash of Airlines PNG Flight 1600 was featured in the 2023 episode "Power Play", of the Canadian-made, internationally distributed documentary series Mayday.
