= Moresada language =

Papuan language of Papua New Guinea

Moresada
- Native to: Papua New Guinea
- Region: Madang Province
- Native speakers: (200 cited 1981)
- Language family: Trans–New Guinea: Madang; Southern Adelbert; Pomoikan; Moresada

Language codes
- ISO 639-3: msx
- Glottolog: more1258
- ELP: Moresada

Moresada is a Papuan language of Madang Province, Papua New Guinea.
