= Sausi language =

Rai Coast language

Sausi
- Wia
- Native to: Papua New Guinea
- Region: Madang Province
- Native speakers: 93 (2007)
- Language family: Trans–New Guinea: Madang; Rai Coast; Evapia; Kesawai–Sausi; Sausi

Language codes
- ISO 639-3: ssj
- Glottolog: saus1246

Sausi, or Wia, is a Rai Coast language spoken in Madang Province, Papua New Guinea.

"Wia" is also rendered "Uya", which is an alternative name of Usu as well.
