= Emem language =

Language of West New Guinea

Emem
- Emumu
- Native to: Indonesia
- Region: Papua
- Native speakers: 2,000 (2005)
- Language family: Pauwasi: East Pauwasi; Emem–Karkar; Emem
- Dialects: North Emem; South Emem

Language codes
- ISO 639-3: enr
- Glottolog: emum1240
- ELP: Emumu

Emem, or Emumu, is an Eastern Pauwasi language in Keerom Regency, Papua Province. It has only 25% lexical similarity with Zorop, the most distinct Eastern Pauwasi language.

North Emem and South Emem are quite distinct. North Emem is transitional into Zorop, and South Emem into Karkar.

== Distribution ==
It is spoken in 5 villages in Web District in Keerom Regency, Indonesia, namely Yuruf, Umuaf/Ubrub, Yambraf Satu, Yambraf Dua, and Semografi villages.
