= Garia language =

The Garia language of New Guinea may refer to:

- The Garia dialect of Uare
- The Garia dialect of Sumau
