= Tauya language =

Rai Coast language of Papua New Guinea

Tauya
- Fo'upo
- Pronunciation: Foʔu Po
- Native to: Papua New Guinea
- Region: Madang Province
- Native speakers: (350 cited 1981)
- Language family: Trans–New Guinea: Madang; Rai Coast; Biyom–Tauya; Tauya

Language codes
- ISO 639-3: tya
- Glottolog: tauy1241

Tauya (also Inafosa) is a Rai Coast language spoken in the Ramu River valley, Madang Province, Papua New Guinea by approximately 350 people. The Linguistics Department at the University of Manitoba in Winnipeg, Canada, has Tauya language resources.

== Classification ==
Tauya is closely genetically related to the Biyom Language and is grouped with Tauya in the Rai Coast subgroup. The two languages relate although Biyom is spoken higher up the mountains as they border close to each other and have been found to have some similarities in diction such as the word kaŋgora meaning initiate which was directly borrowed from the Biyom Language. From this it is known that the two languages have had frequent communication as well as intermarriage between the societies.

== Phonology ==
=== Consonants ===
Tauya Language Consonants
| | Bilabial | Labiodental | Alveolar | Palatal | Velar | Glottal |
|---|---|---|---|---|---|---|
| Plosive | p (b) | | t (d) | | k (g) | ʔ |
| Nasal | m | | n | | | |
| Trill | | | r | | | |
| Fricative | | f | s | | | |
| Approximant | | | | j | | |
Notes: 1. b, d, g are considered marginal phonemes and are denoted by parentheses.; 2. kʷ is a labialized- velar consonant in the language 3. ʔʷ is a labialized glottal stop consonant in the language 4. w is a voiced labialized-velar approximant consonant in the language

In Tauya, four of the consonants r, k, kʷ,ʔʷ have restrictions to specific parts of word structure. r occurs in the word-medial position of words in the language and k, kʷ occur mostly in the word-initial position. ʔʷ is restricted to the morpheme- initial position.

=== Vowels ===
Tauya has five vowels similar to most languages in Papua New Guinea.

| | Front | Central | Back |
|---|---|---|---|
| Close | i | | u |
| Close-mid | e | | o |
| Open | | a | |

e vowel follows many linguistic rules of increasing argument from a lesser clause to a main one. The vowel may change in sound to a sound that is near by, and rounds the lips when in a word.

1. yate -> yati
  - go

Tauya allows for the diphthongs ai, au, ae, ao, ou, oi (although oi is rare).

== Grammar ==
=== Typology ===
Tauya is considered a SOV order language as sentences end strictly with a verb.

1. Niʔisana safe-ra sai ni-pe-i-na
  - Long ago ancestor snake eat
  - Long ago the ancestors ate snakes
2. Ai ne-pi-ʔa-ra pofa oʔo ʔamai-oʔonou-te-i-na...
  - Sibling firewood pick up-collect get
  - All of her older sisters picked up and collected firewood...

Some exceptions do exist as some are derivative to the SOV and use the verb to carry the meaning.

1. Pu-pa pu-pa yate ʔatou-ti-a-na...
  - Run run go arrive
  - He ran and ran and went and arrived...

The Tauya language is a suffixing one and in arguments it is verb agreement is primarily used and case marking is secondarily used. Verb agreement is used to mark singular or plural in arguments.

Medial verbs are used to mark subject of a medial clause that is different or the same from verbs in a clause with a relationship to a following clause.

=== Syllables ===
Tauya syllable structure consists of an onset consonant of (C)V(V). In plural forms of personal pronouns consonants are the final in morphemes, these ones all have a consonant ending of n as seen in sen. The use of consonant in the ending word is followed by a vowel initial in transitive verbs, impersonal verbs and inalienable nouns. Using them to mark objects, experiencers, and possessors inflecting with ~pi suffix.

=== Nouns ===
Consist of personal pronouns, deictic pronouns and full nouns as classes of nouns.

1. These are determined as classes based on suffixing as personal pronouns within Tauya language with ~na, emphatic, ~nasi, restrictive, and ~ʔunama, too. Deictic pronouns do not use these but full nouns are marked as an inflected pronoun.
2. Tauya uses 5 dependent locative roots afa~, above, pise~, uphill, ofe~, below, tofe~, downhill, and ma~ are combined with deictic pronouns; but do not work with personal pronouns and full nouns.

==== Personal pronouns ====
Differentiated by person and only two numbers occurring in various cases, such as the unmarked absolutive case. Using third person singular, ne personal pronouns can occur with proclitics on transitive or impersonal verbs for marking objects or experiencers and inalienable nouns for possessors.

Personal Pronoun Roots of Tauya
| | Singular | Plural |
|---|---|---|
| 1st person | ya | sen |
| 2nd Person | na | ten |
| 3rd Person | ne | nen |

Third person singular is used independently while in inalienable nouns third person objects, experiencers, and possessors are unmarked.

== See also ==
- Brahman languages
