= Anam language =

Papuan language of Papua New Guinea

Anam
- Pondoma
- Native to: Papua New Guinea
- Region: Madang Province
- Native speakers: 1,100 (2003)
- Language family: Trans–New Guinea: Madang; Southern Adelbert; Pomoikan; Anam

Language codes
- ISO 639-3: pda
- Glottolog: anam1247
- ELP: Anam

Anam, or Pondoma, is a Papuan language of Madang Province, Papua New Guinea.
