= Nend language =

Madang language spoken in Papua New Guinea

Nend
- Angaua
- Native to: Papua New Guinea
- Region: Madang Province
- Native speakers: (2,000 cited 1991)
- Language family: Trans–New Guinea: Madang; Southern Adelbert; Sogeram; West; Nend

Language codes
- ISO 639-3: anh
- Glottolog: nend1239
- Coordinates: 5.021378°S 144.841326°E

Nend (Nent), or Angaua, is a Papuan language spoken by the Angaua people of Madang Province, Papua New Guinea. It is spoken in Pasinkap village (5.021378°S 144.841326°E) of Arabaka Rural LLG, Madang Province.

== Phonology ==
Consonants
	Labial	Alveolar	Palatal	Dorsal
Plosive	p	t	tʃ dʒ	k kʷ
Prenasalized	ᵐb	ⁿd ⁿz	ⁿdʒ	ᵑk ᵑg ᵑgʷ
Fricative	v	s z		h
Nasal	m	n		ŋ
Approximant	w	l	j	

Vowels
	Front	Central	Back
High	i	ɨ	u
Mid	e		o
Low		a	
