= Anamgura language =

Papuan language

Anamgura
- Ikundun
- Mindivi
- Region: Madang Province, Papua New Guinea
- Native speakers: (2,000 cited 2000)
- Language family: Trans–New Guinea: Madang; Southern Adelbert; Pomoikan; Anamgura

Language codes
- ISO 639-3: imi
- Glottolog: anam1248

Anamgura (Anamuxra), or Ikundun, is a Papuan language of Madang Province, Papua New Guinea.
