= Yuri language =

Yuri language may refer to:

- Karkar language of New Guinea (also known as Yuri)
- Yuri language (Amazon) (or Yurí)
