= Kwato =

Kwato may be,

- Kwato Island, New Guinea
- Kwato language, Papua New Guinea (but not on Kwato Island)

== See also ==
- Kawato (disambiguation)
