= Kalam languages =

Language family of Papua New Guinea

Kalam
- Kaironk River
- Geographic distribution: Papua New Guinea
- Linguistic classification: Northeast New Guinea?: Madang; Kalam

Language codes
- Glottolog: kala1404

The Kalam languages are a small family of languages in the Madang subgroup of Papua New Guinea. The languages that make up the family are Kalam, Tai, and Kobon.

They are famous for having perhaps the smallest numbers of lexical verbs of any languages in the world, with somewhere in the range of 100 to 120 verbs in the case of Kobon.

It is as yet unclear whether the Gants language is most closely related to the Kalam languages or is one of the Sogeram languages.
