= Manat language =

Madang language spoken in Papua New Guinea

Manat
- Paynamar
- Native to: Papua New Guinea
- Region: Madang Province
- Native speakers: (150 cited 1975)
- Language family: Trans–New Guinea: Madang; Southern Adelbert; Sogeram; Central; Manat

Language codes
- ISO 639-3: pmr
- Glottolog: payn1244
- ELP: Manat

Manat, or Paynamar, is a divergent Madang language spoken in the Adelbert Range of Papua New Guinea.

== Phonology ==
=== Vowels ===
	Front	Central	Back
Close	i	ɨ	u
Mid	e		
Open		a	
