= Ogea people =

Ogea
Regions with significant populations
- Madang Province

Languages
- Ogea language

Religion
- Christianity

The Ogea are a Papuan people from Madang Province of Papua New Guinea speaking the Ogea language. They live in the four villages of Garima, Dogia, Balama, and Erima, bounded by the Gogol and Yawor rivers, and Astrolabe Bay. The first recorded contact with the Ogea by a European was by the Russian scientist, Nicholai Nicholaevich Miklukho-Maklai, who described visits to several Ogea villages between 1871 and 1883 in his diary. Ogea has at least one Russian loanword, "sapora" ('axe, hatchet') evidence perhaps that Miklukho-Maklai introduced metal to the Ogea.
