= Akrukay language =

Ramu language of Papua New Guinea

Akrukay
- Chini
- Native to: Papua New Guinea
- Region: Madang Province
- Native speakers: 75 (2013)
- Language family: Ramu: Ramu proper; Tamolan–Ataitan; Tamolan; Akrukay

Language codes
- ISO 639-3: afi
- Glottolog: akru1241
- ELP: Chini
- Coordinates: 4.885733°S 144.830998°E

Akrukay (or Chini) is a Ramu language of Papua New Guinea. It is spoken in the two villages of Akrurai (4.885733°S 144.830998°E) and Andamang (4.855887°S 144.773677°E) in Akrurai ward, Arabaka Rural LLG, Madang Province.
