= Tya =

Tya or TYA may refer to:

== Languages ==
- Tauya language, a language in Papua New Guinea

== Places ==
- Tin Yat stop, a Light Rail stop in Hong Kong
- Tya, Trøndelag, a river in Trøndelag county, Norway

== Other ==
- Tya (unit), a measure of time meaning "thousands of years ago"
- Theatre for Young Audiences, a branch of theatre arts attended by or created for younger audiences
- NordStar, ICAO code
