= Gants language =

Madang language spoken in Papua New Guinea

Gants
- Gaj
- Native to: Papua New Guinea
- Region: Madang Province
- Native speakers: 2,500 (2015)
- Language family: Madang: Southern Adelbert; Sogeram; Gants

Language codes
- ISO 639-3: gao
- Glottolog: gant1244

Gants, or in native orthography Gaj, is a Madang language of Papua New Guinea.

== Classification ==
Daniels (2017), following Pawley, classifies Gants as an East Sogeram language, with Kursav as its closest relative. Usher concurs.

== Pronouns ==
Gants pronouns may be compared with those of other Madang languages:

	sg	pl
1	ya	a-yu
2	na	na-yu
3	nu	ni-(y)u

The roots ya, na, nu, a-, na-, n(i)- correspond to proto-Sogeram *ya, *na, *nu/*nɨ, *a-, *na-, *nɨ-.
