= Lemio language =

Rai Coast language spoken in Papua New Guinea

Lemio
- Native to: Papua New Guinea
- Region: Madang Province
- Native speakers: 270 (2003)
- Language family: Trans–New Guinea: Madang; Rai Coast; Kabenau; Lemio

Language codes
- ISO 639-3: lei
- Glottolog: lemi1243

Lemio is a Rai Coast language spoken in Madang Province, Papua New Guinea.
