= Bigei River =

River in Papua New Guinea

Bigei River Peka River
- Location within Papua New Guinea

Location
- Country: Papua New Guinea
- Region: Madang Province

Physical characteristics
- Source
  - location: Papua New Guinea
- Mouth
  - coordinates: 5°33′S 145°15′E

The Bigei River or Peka River is a river in northern Papua New Guinea.

== See also ==
- List of rivers of Papua New Guinea
- Peka River languages
