= Kolom language =

Rai Coast language of Papua New Guinea

Kolom
- Migum
- Native to: Papua New Guinea
- Region: Madang Province
- Native speakers: 470 (2003)
- Language family: Trans–New Guinea: Madang; Rai Coast; Kabenau; Kolom

Language codes
- ISO 639-3: klm
- Glottolog: kolo1267

Kolom, also known as Migum, is a Rai Coast language spoken in Madang Province, Papua New Guinea.
