= Kawato =

Kawato may refer to:

- Hirai Kawato (川人 拓来), Japanese professional wrestler (born 1997)
- Kawato Station, railway station in Izumo, Shimane

== See also ==
- Kwato (disambiguation)
