= Mari language (Madang Province) =

Austronesian language of Papua New Guinea

Mari
- Hop
- Native to: Papua New Guinea
- Region: Madang Province
- Native speakers: (810 cited 2000)
- Language family: Austronesian: Malayo-Polynesian; Oceanic; Western Oceanic; North New Guinea ?; Ngero–Vitiaz ?; Huon Gulf; Markham; Upper; Mari

Language codes
- ISO 639-3: hob
- Glottolog: mari1429

Mari, or Hop, is a minor Austronesian language of Madang Province, Papua New Guinea. It is spoken in the four villages of Bumbu (5.985151°S 145.902057°E), Bubirumpun (5.979754°S 145.898206°E), Musuam (5.884498°S 145.739611°E), and Sangkiang (5.921326°S 145.837215°E) in Usino Rural LLG of the Ramu valley.
