= Watiwa language =

Endangered Rai Coast language of Papua New Guinea

Watiwa
- Dumpu
- Native to: Papua New Guinea
- Region: Madang Province
- Native speakers: 510 (2003)
- Language family: Trans–New Guinea: Madang; Rai Coast; Evapia; Watiwa
- Writing system: none

Language codes
- ISO 639-3: wtf
- Glottolog: dump1243

Watiwa is a Rai Coast language of Papua New Guinea.

It is spoken by some 500 people living in six villages in Madang Province, Papua New Guinea, including Bebei (5.861935°S 145.711953°E) and Dumpu (5.888972°S 145.736011°E) villages of Usino Rural LLG.

It is more commonly known as Dumpu, but this is the name of one of the six villages, and is not accepted as a name for the language. Surviving mostly as a secret language with which to talk amongst themselves when outsiders are present, the majority of the speakers use Tok Pisin in daily life. Due to its increasingly rare use, it is estimated that this language will be extinct in a few decades.
