= Pulabu language =

Rai Coast language of Papua New Guinea

Pulabu
- Native to: Papua New Guinea
- Region: Madang Province
- Native speakers: (120 cited 1981)
- Language family: Trans–New Guinea: Madang; Rai Coast; Kabenau; Pulabu

Language codes
- ISO 639-3: pup
- Glottolog: pula1267

Pulabu is a Rai Coast language spoken in Madang Province, Papua New Guinea.
