= Transgogol Rural LLG =

Local-level government in Papua New Guinea

- Location within Papua New Guinea
- Coordinates: 5.14°S 145.41°E
- Country: Papua New Guinea
- Province: Madang Province
- District: Madang District

Area
  - Total: 1,845 km^{2} (712 sq mi)

Population (2021 Estimate)
  - Total: 30,217
  - Density: 16.38/km^{2} (42.42/sq mi)
- Time zone: UTC+10 (AEST)

Transgogol Rural LLG is a local-level government (LLG) of Madang Province, Papua New Guinea.

== Wards ==
- 01. Melowaba
- 02. Gumaru Mawan
- 03. Amaimon (Amaimon language speakers)
- 04. Baisarik
- 05. Bemari Waguma
- 06. Garinam
- 07. Barum
- 08. Buroa
- 09. Butade
- 10. Kagi
- 11. Ensuda
- 12. Bai
- 13. Dawa Bigawa
- 14. Babaran Imam
- 15. Kosilanta
- 16. Abiya
