= Rerau language =

Rai Coast language of Papua New Guinea

Rerau
- Native to: Papua New Guinea
- Region: Madang Province
- Native speakers: (590 cited 2000 census)
- Language family: Trans–New Guinea: Madang; Rai Coast; Awung River; Rerau

Language codes
- ISO 639-3: rea
- Glottolog: rera1240

Rerau is a Rai Coast language spoken in Madang Province, Papua New Guinea.
