= Guabe River =

River in Papua New Guinea

- Location within Papua New Guinea

Location
- Country: Papua New Guinea
- Region: Madang Province

Physical characteristics
- Source
  - location: Papua New Guinea
- Mouth
  - coordinates: 5°29′20″S 145°53′54″E

The Guabe River is a river in northern Papua New Guinea. It is the biggest river in Papua New Guinea.

== History ==
On October 13, 2011, a Dash 8-100 plane operated by Airlines PNG as Flight 1600 crashed near the river. 28 of the 32 people on board were killed.

== See also ==
- Airlines PNG Flight 1600
- List of rivers of Papua New Guinea
- Guabe River languages
