= Kursav language =

Madang language of Papua New Guinea

Kursav
- Kulsab, Faita
- Native to: Papua New Guinea
- Region: Madang Province
- Native speakers: 10 (2015)
- Language family: Trans–New Guinea: Madang; Southern Adelbert; Sogeram; East; Kursav

Language codes
- ISO 639-3: faj
- Glottolog: fait1240
- ELP: Kursav
- Kursav is classified as Severely Endangered by the UNESCO Atlas of the World's Languages in Danger.

Kursav (also known as Faita or Kulsab) is a divergent and nearly extinct Madang language of the Adelbert Range of Papua New Guinea. It was once placed in the now-defunct Brahman branch of Madang. Daniels (2017) identifies Gants as its closest relative.

== Sources ==
- Daniels, Don. 2015. A Reconstruction of Proto-Sogeram: Phonology, Lexicon, and Morphosyntax. Doctoral dissertation, University of California at Santa Barbara.
