= Jilim language =

Rai Coast language of Papua New Guinea

Jilim
- Native to: Papua New Guinea
- Region: Madang Province
- Native speakers: (650 cited 2000 census)
- Language family: Trans–New Guinea: Madang; Rai Coast; Awung River; Jilim

Language codes
- ISO 639-3: jil
- Glottolog: jili1241

Sgi Bara (Jilim) is a Rai Coast language spoken in Madang Province, Papua New Guinea in the northwestern foothills of the Finisterre Range, near Astrolabe Bay. The language’s speakers, who probably number around 700, primarily live in the three villages of Albu, Dumbu, and Jilim. Communities in northern Papua New Guinea have been shifting to Tok Pisin for decades.
