= Danaru language =

Rai Coast language of Papua New Guinea

Danaru
- Native to: Papua New Guinea
- Region: Madang Province
- Native speakers: 260 (2003)
- Language family: Trans–New Guinea: Madang; Rai Coast; Peka; Danaru

Language codes
- ISO 639-3: dnr
- Glottolog: dana1254

Danaru is a Rai Coast language of Papua New Guinea. It is spoken in the single village of Danaru (5.560455°S 145.416851°E) in Usino Rural LLG, Madang Province, Papua New Guinea.
