= Arabaka Rural LLG =

Local-level government in Papua New Guinea

- Country: Papua New Guinea
- Province: Madang Province
- District: Middle Ramu District

Area
  - Total: 2,869 km^{2} (1,108 sq mi)

Population (2021 Estimate)
  - Total: 47,239
  - Density: 16.47/km^{2} (42.64/sq mi)
- Time zone: UTC+10 (AEST)

Arabaka Rural LLG is a local-level government (LLG) of Madang Province, Papua New Guinea.

== Wards ==
- 01. Gokta
- 02. Jakipuat
- 03. Atiapi
- 04. Diam
- 05. Moibu
- 06. Gragebu
- 07. Nodabu
- 08. Paibu
- 09. Watabu
- 10. Grengabu
- 11. Chungribu
- 12. Limbubu
- 13. Kwanga
- 14. Askunka
- 15. Misingi
- 16. Nambringi
- 17. Bumbera
- 18. Bunungum
- 19. Gosingi
- 20. Brokoto
- 21. Akurukai (Akrukay language speakers)
- 22. Wawapi
- 23. Ipokondor
- 24. Rarapi
- 25. Awam
- 26. Akavangu (Nend language speakers)
- 27. Astangu
- 28. Atemble (Mand language speakers)
- 29. Iporaitz
- 30. Iragarat
- 31. Anamunk
- 32. Apanam
- 33. Jogoi
- 34. Sotebu
