= Aisi language =

Madang language spoken in Papua New Guinea

Aisi
- Musak
- Native to: Papua New Guinea
- Region: Madang Province
- Native speakers: 400 (2015)
- Language family: Trans–New Guinea: Madang; Southern Adelbert; Sogeram; East; Aisi

Language codes
- ISO 639-3: mmq
- Glottolog: musa1266
- ELP: Aisi

Aisi, or Musak, is a Papuan language of Madang Province, Papua New Guinea.

Aisi is spoken in Musak (5.335931°S 145.240255°E), Kikerai (5.248069°S 145.21067°E), Banam (5.413751°S 145.237589°E), Sepu (5.458793°S 145.214516°E), and Garaligut (5.473568°S 145.265295°E) villages in Usino Rural LLG. The largest Aisi-speaking villages are Sepu, Banam, and Musak, located just to the east of the Ramu River.

== See also ==
- Swadesh list of Aisi and Magɨ
