= Usino Rural LLG =

Local-level government in Papua New Guinea

- Location within Papua New Guinea
- Coordinates: 5.525978°S 145.374398°E
- Country: Papua New Guinea
- Province: Madang Province
- District: Usino Bundi District

Area
  - Total: 2,830 km^{2} (1,090 sq mi)

Population (2021 Estimate)
  - Total: 74,000
  - Density: 26/km^{2} (68/sq mi)
- Time zone: UTC+10 (AEST)

Usino Rural LLG is a local-level government (LLG) of Madang Province, Papua New Guinea.

== Wards ==
- 01. Bumbu (Mari language speakers)
- 06. Sankain (Mari language speakers)
- 07. Dumpu (Watiwa language speakers)
- 08. Kesawai
- 09. Aliveti
- 10. Koropa
- 11. Sausi
- 12. Korona
- 13. Yakumbu
- 14. Walium
- 15. Kuragina
- 16. Waput (Danaru language speakers)
- 17. Puksak
- 18. Naru
- 19. Somau
- 20. Mopo
- 21. Animinik
- 22. Negeri
- 23. Begesin
- 24. Koinegur
- 25. Baisop
- 26. Kunduk
- 27. Eunime
- 28. Komas
- 29. Igoi
- 30. Usino Station
- 31. Boko
- 32. Garaligut (Aisi language speakers)
- 33. Musak (Aisi language speakers)
- 34. Kukapang
- 83. Ramu Sugar Urban
