= Arawum language =

Endangered Rai Coast language of Papua New Guinea

Arawum
- Native to: Papua New Guinea
- Region: Madang Province
- Native speakers: (60 cited 2000)
- Language family: Trans–New Guinea: Madang; Rai Coast; Kabenau; Arawum

Language codes
- ISO 639-3: awm
- Glottolog: araw1272
- ELP: Arawum
- Arawum is classified as Severely Endangered by the UNESCO Atlas of the World's Languages in Danger.

Arawum is a nearly extinct Rai Coast language spoken in Madang Province, Papua New Guinea.
