= Duduela language =

Rai Coast language spoken in Papua New Guinea

Duduela
- Native to: Papua New Guinea
- Region: Madang Province
- Native speakers: 1,000 (2008)
- Language family: Trans–New Guinea: Madang; Rai Coast; Nuru; Duduela
- Dialects: Uyajitaya (Uyaji); Amowe

Language codes
- ISO 639-3: duk
- Glottolog: dudu1240

Duduela is a Rai Coast language, or pair of languages, spoken in Madang Province, Papua New Guinea. Varieties are Uyaji, also known as Uyajitaya, and Amowe.
