= Dem language =

Language spoken in New Guinea

Dem
- Lem
- Region: Papua: Western highlands along Rouffaer River headwaters
- Native speakers: (1,000 cited 1987)
- Language family: Trans–New Guinea: West Papuan Highlands (Irian Highlands); Amung–Dem; Dem

Language codes
- ISO 639-3: dem
- Glottolog: demm1245
- ELP: Dem
- Map: The Dem language of New Guinea The Dem language Other Trans–New Guinea languages Other Papuan languages Austronesian languages Uninhabited

Dem (Lem, Ndem) is a divergent Papuan language of West New Guinea. Although Palmer (2018) leaves it unclassified, it was tentatively included in the Trans–New Guinea family in the classification of Malcolm Ross (2005), and Timothy Usher ties it most closely to Amung.

== Pronouns ==
The only pronouns which have been recorded are:

	singular	plural
1st person	nau	yu
2nd person	aŋ	

== Vocabulary ==
The following basic vocabulary words are from Voorhoeve (1975), as cited in the Trans-New Guinea database:

gloss	Dem
head	yagabuak
hair	ari; yakuli
eye	eŋgio
tooth	yavkasa
leg	abuo
louse	nduu
dog	kwa
pig	uwam; uwom
bird	bela
egg	au; onde
blood	miet
skin	aran; asi
tree	niye
man	ŋo
sun	uweməja
water	da; yat
fire	kunu
stone	(da)ŋat
name	aluŋ; gago
eat	nenawe
one	yagaŋ
two	ugwaŋ
