= Ogea language =

Madang language spoken in Papua New Guinea

Ogea
- Erima
- Native to: Papua New Guinea
- Region: Madang Province
- Ethnicity: Ogea people
- Native speakers: 2,200 (2003)
- Language family: Trans–New Guinea: Madang; Rai Coast; Nuru; Ogea

Language codes
- ISO 639-3: eri
- Glottolog: ogea1238

Ogea or Erima is a Papuan language spoken by approximately 2210 people living in an area 18 kilometers south of the town of Madang, in the Madang Province of Papua New Guinea.

== Language characteristics ==
Phonemically, Ogea has a 15 vowel system with 17 consonants. Syntactically, Ogea is a Subject-Object-Verb (SOV) language, with adjectives following nouns, and deictics following adjectives—the reverse of English.

Morphologically, Ogea is a highly inflected, suffixing language, with most of the complexity occurring with verbs. There are over 100 basic verbal suffixes, the number of which is significantly multiplied by allomorphic variants. Ogea sentences are often composed of chains of verbs, with suffixes indicating sentence medial versus final positions. Ogea verbs encode inter-clausal temporality (temporal succession—one action occurs following another—and temporal overlap—actions occur simultaneously). They also encode switch reference. Switch reference indicates whether the referents of the clause in question are referents in the following clause.

It is useful to classify Ogea verbal suffixes into two major categories: endocentric and exocentric, following the lead of Staalesen and Wells. Endocentric suffixes occur between the verb root and the exocenter. Endocentric suffixes include manner, object, and benefactive suffixes, among others. The same set of endocentric suffixes are used with varying sets of exocentric suffixes. The endocenter is composed of the verb root plus the endocentric suffixes. Exocentric suffixes encode inter-clausal temporality, tense, mood, subject, and switch reference. They are termed exocentric because they may contain suffixes that relate to the clause that follows. That is, the inter-clausal temporality and switch reference relate the current clause to the one that follows it.

== Phonology ==
=== Consonants ===
| | | Labial | Alveolar | Palatal | Velar | Glottal |
|---|---|---|---|---|---|---|
| Nasal | | m | n | ɲ | ŋ | |
| Plosive/ Affricate | voiceless | p | t | | k | |
| Plosive/ Affricate | voiced | b | d | dʑ | ɡ | |
| Plosive/ Affricate | prenasal | ᵐb | ⁿd | | ᵑɡ | |
| Fricative | | | s | | | h |
| Trill | | | r | | | |
| Approximant | | w | l | j | | |

/w/ may also be heard as [β] before /e/.

=== Vowels ===
| | Front | Central | | Back | |
| | Front | plain | nasal | plain | nasal |
|---|---|---|---|---|---|
| High | i, iː | | | u, uː | ũ, ũː |
| Mid | e, eː | | | o, oː | |
| Low | | a, aː | ãː | | |
