= Sumau language =

Rai Coast language of Papua New Guinea

Sumau
- Garia
- Native to: Papua New Guinea
- Region: Madang Province
- Native speakers: 2,600 (2003)
- Language family: Trans–New Guinea: Madang; Rai Coast; Peka; Sumau

Language codes
- ISO 639-3: six
- Glottolog: suma1270

Sumau, also known as Garia (Kari), is a Rai Coast language spoken in Madang Province, Papua New Guinea.
