= John Tyas =

English linguist and bibliophile

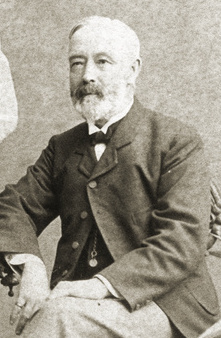
- Occupation: Barrister

John Walter Tyas (26 November 1833 – 18 December 1903) was a linguist, bibliophile and University of Adelaide registrar.

Tyas was the second son of John Tyas, for many years a member of the literary staff of The Times, was born in Brixton, London, educated in France and afterwards at London University School and at King's College School, London. In 1854 he became tutor to the sons of John Walter (third), a member of the House of Commons and proprietor of the Times. In 1861 he was admitted to the bar at the Inner Temple, and was attached to the staff of the Times for about four years. In February 1868 he arrived in Adelaide, and joined as a partner the firm of Carter, Tyas, & Co., Manchester warehousemen.

In 1872 he visited the Aroo Islands, the coasts of New Guinea, and the Northern Territory, on a pearl-shelling expedition. Tyas returned to England in 1873; and for a time resided in Germany, going back to Australia in 1878. In 1882 he was appointed Registrar of the University of Adelaide.

Tyas resigned from the University of Adelaide due to ill health in January 1892. He returned to London in 1893, living at Campayne Gardens, South Hampstead. Tyas had married Jane Turner on 11 September 1879 at St Paul's Anglican Church, Adelaide; together they had four daughters. Tyas died of heart disease and bronchitis in his home in South Hampstead on 18 December 1903.
