= Karkar language =

Eastern Pauwasi language of Papua New Guinea

Karkar
- Yuri, Karkar-Yuri
- Native to: Papua New Guinea
- Region: Green River Rural LLG, Sandaun Province: along the PNG-Indonesia border.
- Native speakers: (1,100 cited 1994)
- Language family: Pauwasi: East Pauwasi; Emem–Karkar; Karkar
- Dialects: North-Central; Aula-Tarauwi; Usari

Language codes
- ISO 639-3: yuj
- Glottolog: kark1258
- ELP: Karkar-Yuri
- Coordinates: 3°44′S 141°5′E

Karkar, also known as Yuri, is the sole Eastern Pauwasi language of Papua New Guinea. There are about a thousand speakers along the Indonesian border spoken in Green River Rural LLG, Sandaun Province.

== Classification ==
Karkar-Yuri is not related to any other language in Papua New Guinea, and was therefore long thought to be a language isolate. This is the position of Wurm (1983), Foley (1986), and Ross (2005). However, Timothy Usher noticed that it is transparently related to the Pauwasi languages across the border in Indonesia. Indeed, it may even form a dialect continuum with the Eastern Pauwasi language Emem. This was foreshadowed in non-linguistic literature: a 1940 map shows the 'Enam' (Emem)–speaking area as including the Karkar territory in PNG, and the anthropologist Hanns Peter knew that the Karkar dialect continuum continued across the border into Emem territory.

=== Pauwasi cognates ===
Cognates between Karkar-Yuri and the Pauwasi family (Tebi and Zorop languages) listed by Foley (2018):

Karkar-Yuri and Pauwasi family cognates
gloss	Tebi	Zorop	Karkar-Yuri
‘I’	na	nam	ɔn
‘you (sg)’	fro	nem	am
‘we’	numu	nim	nəm (incl)/yin (excl)
‘belly’	dialə	yalək	yare
‘bird’	olmu	awe	ant
‘black’	təŋəra	seŋgəri	yəkəre
‘blood’	təri	mob	yəri
‘breast’	mamu	muam	mɔm
‘come’	kəlawai	kwalopai	koʔrop
‘eat’	ne	fer-	fɨr
‘eye’	ei	ji	yi
‘foot’	puŋwa	fuŋi	pu
‘give’	taʔa	tipi	səp
‘good’	pani	kiap	kwapwe
‘hand’	təro	jae	yæ
‘head’	məndini	məndai	me
‘hear’	fei	fau	wao
‘house’		nab	nap
‘louse’	mi	yemar	yəʔmər
‘man’	toŋkwar	arab	arɔp
‘mosquito’	mimi	yəŋkar	təʔnkarəp
‘name’	kini	jei	e
‘road’	fiaʔa	mai	mwæ
‘root’	periŋgu	fiŋgu	arak
‘sand’	tədən	gərək	kaʔrək
‘tooth’	kle	jurai	yu
‘tree’	weyalgi	war	yao
‘water’	ai	jewek	ənt
‘who’	mate	waunap	wao
‘one’	kərowali	aŋgətəwam	ankər
‘two’	kre	anəŋgar	anənk

== Dialects ==
Dialects are:

- North Central Yuri dialect, spoken in Yuri village (3.89509°S 141.176452°E), Abaru ward, Green River Rural LLG
- Auia-Tarauwi dialect, spoken in Auia (Auiya) village (3.838611°S 141.138294°E), Auiya 1 ward, Green River Rural LLG; and in Tarauwi (Trowari) village (3.837695°S 141.035174°E), Kambriap ward, Green River Rural LLG
- Usari dialect, spoken in Usari village (3.854202°S 141.148112°E), Auiya 1 ward, Green River Rural LLG

== Phonology ==
The Karkar inventory is as follows.

Stress assignment is complex, but not phonemic within morphemes. Syllable structure is CVC, assuming nasal–plosive sequences are analyzed as prenasalized consonants.

=== Vowels ===
Karkar has a vowel inventory consisting of 11 vowels, which is considered very high for a Papuan language.

Karkar vowels
	Front	Central	Back
Close	i	ɨ	u
Close-mid	e	ə	o
Mid	ɛ	ə	ɔ
Open-mid	ɛ	ɐ	ɔ
Open		ɐ	ɑ

There is also one diphthong, ao /ɒɔ/. Vowels are written á /ɐ/, é /ə/, ae /ɛ/, o /ɔ/, ou /o/, ɨ /ɨ/.

Foley (2018) lists the 11 Karkar-Yuri vowels as:

	Front	Central	Back
Close	i	ɨ	u
Mid	e	ə	o
Near-open	æ	ʌ	ɔ
Open	a	ɒ	

Some vowel height contrasts in Karkar-Yuri (Foley 2018):

- ki ‘yam’
- kɨ ‘loosen’
- ku ‘cut crosswise in half’
- ke ‘edible nut’
- kər ‘put in netbag’
- ko ‘pig’
- kæ ‘egg’
- kʌʔr ‘swamp’
- kɔ ‘again’
- kar ‘speech’
- kɒ ‘bird species’

There are four contrasting central vowel heights:

- kɨr ‘red bird of paradise’ (Paradisaea rubra)
- kər ‘put in net bag’
- kʌʔr ‘swamp’
- kar ‘speech’

=== Consonants ===
Karkar consonants
		Labial		Alveolar	Retroflex/ palatal	Velar		Glottal
		plain	labialized	Alveolar	Retroflex/ palatal	plain	labialized	Glottal
Nasal	plain	m	mʷ	n				
Nasal	glottalized	ˀm		ˀn				
Stop	plain	p	pʷ	t		k	kʷ	ʔ
Stop	prenasalized	ᵐp	ᵐpʷ	ⁿt		ᵑk	ᵑkʷ	
Fricative		f	fʷ	s				
Flap				ˀɾ	ɽ			
Approximant					j		w	

The rhotics and glottal(ized) consonants do not appear initially in a word, and plain /t/, the approximants, and the labialized consonants do not occur finally. Glottal stop only occurs finally. Final k spirantizes to [x]. Plosives are voiced intervocalically. Intervocalic f and p neutralize to [β] (apart from a few names, where [f] is retained), and intervocalic k is voiced to [ɣ]. Phonemic labialized stops only occur in two words, apwar 'weeds, to weed' and ankwap 'another'. Otherwise consonants are labialized between a rounded and a front vowel, as in pok-ea [pɔɣʷeɑ] 'going up'. In some words, the plosive of a final NC is silent unless suffixed: onomp [ɔnɔm̚] 'my', onompono [ɔnɔmbɔnɔ] 'it's mine'.

Prenasalized and labialized consonant contrasts:

- pi ‘bird tail’, pwi ‘enough’, mporan ‘tomorrow’
- kar ‘voice’, ŋkɔte ‘over there’, kwar ‘ground’, ŋkwakwo ‘many kinds’

Plain and preglottalized sonorants contrasts, which only occur in word finals:

- ərər ‘sore’, ərəʔr ‘dig a hole’
- pan ‘sago flour’, pəʔn ‘blunt’

== Writing system ==
Karkar alphabet
a	á	ae	ao	e	é	i	ɨ	o	ou	u	f	fw	k	kw	m
mw	m	mp	mpw	n	nk	nkw	nt	p	pw	r	s	t	w	y	

== Pronouns ==
Pronouns listed by Ross (2005):

	sg	pl
1ex	on-o	yin-o
1in	on-o	nám-o
2	am-o	yum-o
3	ma-o

Object forms take -an, sometimes replacing the -o: onan, amoan, man, yinan, námoan, yumoan. Mao is a demonstrative 'that one, those'; it contrasts with nko, nkoan 'the other one(s)'.

Pronouns listed by Foley (2018) are:

Karkar-Yuri pronouns
	sg	pl
1incl		nʌmɔ
1excl	ɔn	yin
2	amɔ	yumɔ
3	ma	

== Vocabulary ==
Below are some basic vocabulary words in Karkar-Yuri.

Karkar-Yuri basic vocabulary
‘I’	ɔn
‘you (sg)’	am
‘we’	nəm (incl) / yin (excl)
‘belly’	yare
‘bird’	ant
‘black’	yəkəre
‘blood’	yəri
‘breast’	mɔm
‘come’	koʔrop
‘eat’	fɨr
‘eye’	yi
‘foot’	pu
‘give’	səp
‘good’	kwapwe
‘hand’	yæ
‘head’	me
‘hear’	wao
‘house’	nap
‘louse’	yəʔmər
‘man’	arɔp
‘mosquito’	təʔnkarəp
‘name’	e
‘road’	mwæ
‘root’	arak
‘sand’	kaʔrək
‘tooth’	yu
‘tree’	yao
‘water’	ənt
‘who’	wao
‘one’	ankər
‘two’	anənk
