= Sogeram River =

River in Papua New Guinea

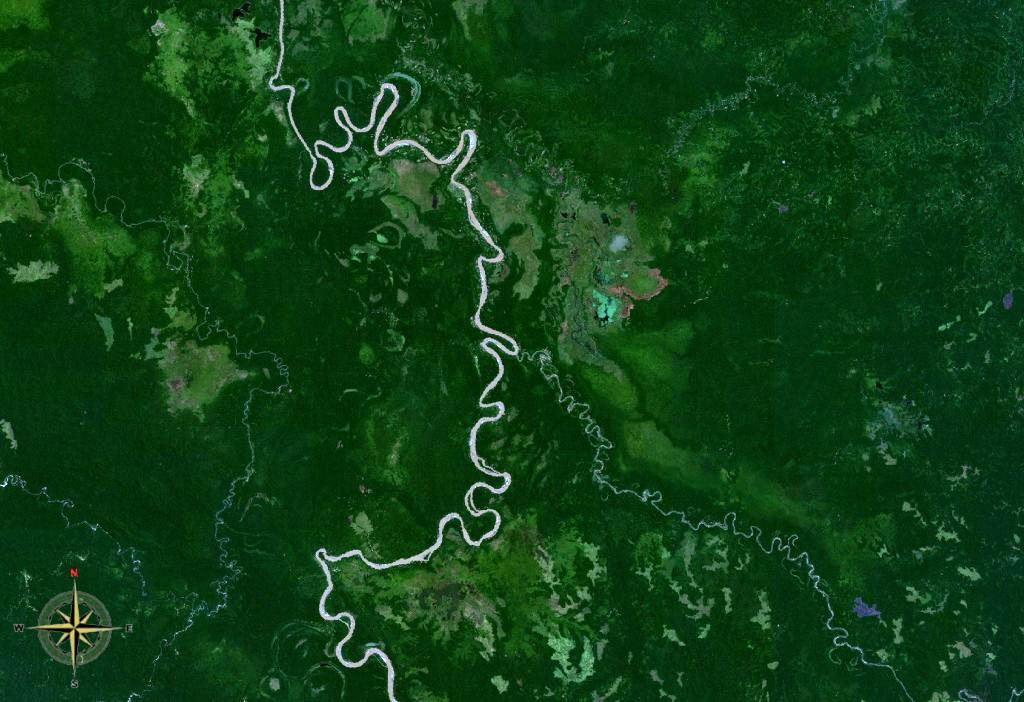
- Confluence of Ramu and Sogeram Rivers seen from space

Location
- Country: Papua New Guinea
- Region: Madang Province

Physical characteristics
- Source
  - location: Papua New Guinea
- Mouth
  - location: Ramu River

Sogeram River is a river in Madang Province, Papua New Guinea. It empties into the Ramu River at 4.8°S 144.7333333°E.

The Sogeram River languages are spoken in the Sogeram River watershed.

== See also ==
- Sogeram River languages
