= Urigina language =

Rai Coast language of Papua New Guinea

Urigina
- Kobuka
- Native to: Papua New Guinea
- Region: Madang Province
- Native speakers: (1,500 cited 2000)
- Language family: Trans–New Guinea: Madang; Rai Coast; Peka; Urigina

Language codes
- ISO 639-3: urg
- Glottolog: urig1240

Urigina, or Kobuka, is a Rai Coast language spoken in Madang Province, Papua New Guinea.
