= Yangulam language =

Rai Coast language spoken in Papua New Guinea

Yangulam
- Native to: Papua New Guinea
- Region: Madang Province
- Native speakers: (400 cited 2000 census)
- Language family: Trans–New Guinea: Madang; Rai Coast; Awung River; Yangulam

Language codes
- ISO 639-3: ynl
- Glottolog: yang1298

Yangulam is a Rai Coast language spoken in Madang Province, Papua New Guinea.
