= Uya language =

Rai Coast language spoken in Papua New Guinea

Uya
- Usu
- Native to: Papua New Guinea
- Region: Madang Province
- Native speakers: 270 (2003)
- Language family: Trans–New Guinea: Madang; Rai Coast; Nuru; Uya

Language codes
- ISO 639-3: usu
- Glottolog: uyaa1238
- ELP: Uya

Uya, also known as Usu, is a Rai Coast language spoken in Madang Province, Papua New Guinea.
