= Waube language =

Rai Coast language spoken in Papua New Guinea

Kwato
- Waupe
- Native to: Papua New Guinea
- Region: Madang Province
- Native speakers: (780 cited 1981)
- Language family: Trans–New Guinea: Madang; Rai Coast; Nuru; Kwato

Language codes
- ISO 639-3: kop
- Glottolog: kwat1244

Kwato or Waupe is a Rai Coast language spoken in Madang Province, Papua New Guinea.
