= Kou language =

Rai Coast language spoken in Papua New Guinea

Kou
- Sinsauru
- Native to: Papua New Guinea
- Region: Madang Province
- Native speakers: 500 (2003) (unclear if figure includes speakers of "Asas")
- Language family: Trans–New Guinea: Madang; Rai Coast; Evapia; Kou

Language codes
- ISO 639-3: snz
- Glottolog: asas1241

Kou (Kow), or Sinsauru, is a Rai Coast language spoken in Madang Province, Papua New Guinea. The putative "Asas" language is just the Kou spoken in Asas village.
