= Biyom language =

Rai Coast language of Papua New Guinea

Biyom
- Native to: Papua New Guinea
- Region: Madang Province
- Native speakers: 650 (2011)
- Language family: Trans–New Guinea: Madang; Rai Coast; Biyom–Tauya; Biyom

Language codes
- ISO 639-3: bpm
- Glottolog: biyo1244

Biyom is a Rai Coast language spoken in Madang Province, Papua New Guinea. It has 650 speakers.
