= East Pauwasi languages =

Papuan language family

East Pauwasi
- East Pauwasi River
- Geographic distribution: Western New Guinea, Papua New Guinea
- Linguistic classification: Pauwasi: East Pauwasi
- Subdivisions: Yafi; Emumu–Karkar

Language codes
- Glottolog: east2530

The East Pauwasi languages are a family of Papuan languages spoken in north-central New Guinea, on both sides of the Indonesia-Papua New Guinea border. They may either form part of a larger Pauwasi language family along with the Western Pauwasi languages, or they could form an independent language family.

== Languages ==
According to Timothy Usher, the East Pauwasi languages, which seem to form a dialect chain, are:

East Pauwasi River

- Zorop (Yafi)
- Emem–Karkar
  - Emem (Emumu)
    - North Emem
    - South Emem
  - Karkar (Yuri)

Usher also identified the Karkar (Yuri) language as Pauwasi.

== Lexical reconstruction ==
Some lexical reconstructions of Proto-East Pauwasi by Usher (2020) are:

gloss	Proto-East Pauwasi
head/hair	*mɛ
leaf/hair	*mbVwa^{i}
ear	*wVpi
eye	*ji
nose	*mɛ^{i}
seed/tooth	*jɔ
tongue	*mɜtaɺVp
foot/leg	*mbu
blood	*mɜp
bone	*ŋgVɺ
skin/bark	*apV, *jipi
breast	*mɵ̝m
louse	*jəmVɺ
pig	*pVɺ
bird	*and
egg	*jVn
tree	*naɺV, *waɺ
man/husband	*jɵ̝pɛ
woman	*VɺVm[i]
sun/sky	*jəmaɺ
moon	*juŋg
water	*Vnd
fire/wood	*ja^{u}
stone	*mbVɺi
path	*mVwa^{i}
name	*ɛ^{i}
eat/drink	*pɜɺ
one	*aŋgVtamb
two	*anVŋg

== Vocabulary comparison ==
The following basic vocabulary words are from Voorhoeve (1971, 1975), as cited in the Trans-New Guinea database.

The words cited constitute translation equivalents, whether they are cognate (e.g. məndai, məndini, mindimna for “head”) or not (e.g. kolk, əndai, gwane for “bone”).

Language	Emem	Zorop	Tebi	Towei
head	yebikol	məndai	məndini	mindimna
hair	yebipai	mepai	məndini-teke; məndini- teke	mindi-teke
ear		waigi	faʔa	
eye	yu	dji; ji	ei; i	ei
nose		məŋai	məndi	
tooth	jokol	djurai; jurai	kle	kəreser
tongue		metaləp	klemalbo	
leg	puke	fu(ŋi)	puŋwa	popnoa
louse	yemare	jemar; yemar	mi	
dog	ende	jendru; yendru		
pig	fər	sər		
bird	olmu	awe	lumu; olmu	yemu
egg	yen	sen	alani; membi	jek
blood	mobe	mob	teri; təri	edefi
bone	kolk	əndai	gwane; gwano	pana
skin	abe	fou; wu	ser	ser
breast		muam	mamu	
tree	nare; walti	nare; war; wiŋgu	wejalgi; weyalgi	wemu
man	yube	arab	toŋkwar	tokwar
woman		elim	keke	
sun	yəmar	djəmar; jemar	maʔa	yimap
moon		djunk	wuluma	
water	ende	djewek; yender	ai	eye
fire	yau	dau; ju	we	we
stone	yomei	andrur	kwola	mafi
road, path		mai	fiaʔa	
name	ei	awei; djei; jei	kini	ken
eat	fer	fel; fer	ne	nembra
one	gərakam	aŋgətəwam; əŋətəwam	kərowali	giona
two	anəŋgiar	anəŋgar	kre	krana
