= Kesawai language =

Rai Coast language of Papua New Guinea

Kesawai
- Native to: Papua New Guinea
- Region: Madang Province
- Ethnicity: 890 (2000 census)
- Native speakers: 700 (2008)
- Language family: Trans–New Guinea: Madang; Rai Coast; Evapia; Kesawai–Sausi; Kesawai

Language codes
- ISO 639-3: xes
- Glottolog: kesa1244

Kesawai is a Rai Coast language spoken in Madang Province, Papua New Guinea.
