= Brahman, Papua New Guinea =

Cattle station in Papua New Guinea

Brahman
- IATA: BRH; ICAO: none

Summary
- Location: Madang Province, Papua New Guinea
- Time zone: AEST (+10)
- Elevation AMSL: 420 ft / 128 m
- Coordinates: 5.7°S 145.367°E

Map
- Location within Papua New Guinea

Brahman is a cattle station supplied with an airport near the eastern highlands of Madang Province, Papua New Guinea. It is located 500 km north of Port Moresby and is 128 meters above sea level.

The land around Brahman is diverse. The highest local point is 1,644 meters, 9 km west of Brahman. (Note: Calculated from the height data (DEM 3") at Viewfinder Panoramas. The full algorithm is here.) There are 12 people per square kilometer around Brahman. The area is surrounded by forest.

The climate is tropical. The average temperature was 22 °C. The warmest month is August, at 24 °C, and the coolest is February, at 19 °C. Average rainfall is 346.7 cm per year. The rainiest month is March, at 43.1 cm, and the least is August, at 15.5 cm.

Brahman

Climate chart (precipitation, max. and min. temperature)
J	F	M	A	M	J	J	A	S	O	N	D
414 25 17	383 24 14	431 25 14	346 26 17	263 24 20	192 26 19	162 25 20	155 27 20	222 27 19	286 27 19	264 26 18	350 26 18
- █ Average max. and min. temperatures in °C
- █ Precipitation totals in mm
Imperial conversion
J	F	M	A	M	J	J	A	S	O	N	D
16 77 63	15 75 57	17 77 57	14 79 63	10 75 68	7.6 79 66	6.4 77 68	6.1 81 68	8.7 81 66	11 81 66	10 79 64	14 79 64
- █ Average max. and min. temperatures in °F
- █ Precipitation totals in inches

== See also ==
- Brahman languages
