= Wanang River =

River in Papua New Guinea

- Location within Papua New Guinea

Location
- Country: Papua New Guinea
- Region: Madang Province

Physical characteristics
- Source
  - location: Papua New Guinea
- Mouth
  - coordinates: 4°57′00″S 145°02′00″E

The Wanang River is a river in Madang Province, Papua New Guinea.

Sogeram languages, also called Wanang languages, are spoken in the area.

== See also ==
- List of rivers of Papua New Guinea
- Wanang River languages
