= Thrust lever =

Manual control of the thrust of an aircraft's engines from the cockpit

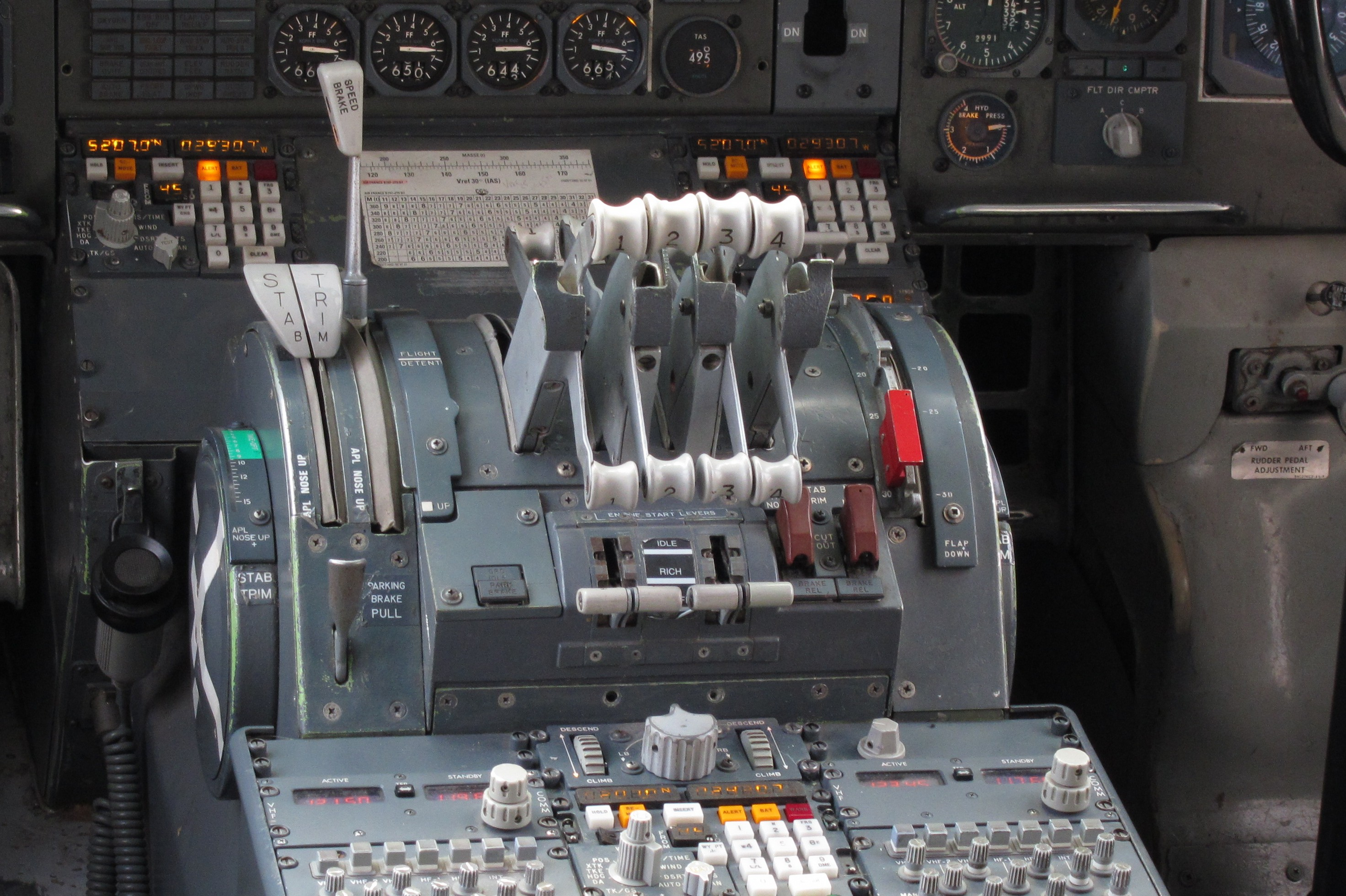
Thrust levers in a Boeing 747 Classic. The center and rear levers are used during flight, while the forward levers control reverse thrust.

Thrust levers or throttle levers are found in the cockpit of aircraft, and are used by the pilot, copilot, flight engineer, or autopilot to control the thrust output of the aircraft's engines, by controlling the fuel flow to those engines. Throttle levers are also used on many boats.

In multi-engine aircraft, each thrust lever displays the engine number of the engine it controls. Normally, there is one thrust lever for each engine. The thrust levers are normally found in the aircraft's center console, or on the dashboard of smaller aircraft.

For aircraft equipped with thrust reversal, the control for each thrust reverser is usually found adjacent to the corresponding engine's thrust lever.

The position of each lever can be described by the current angle indicated. This is referred to as the throttle lever angle (TLA). The greater the TLA, the greater the engine thrust.

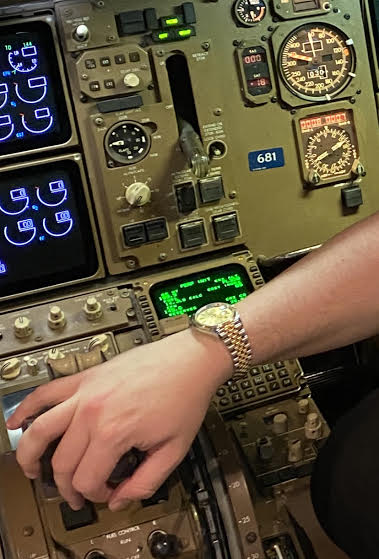
Airline Pilot rests hand on throttle quadrant of a Boeing 767

The throttle lever assembly is often designed to incorporate high-pressure (HP) cock switches so that the pilot has instinctive control of the fuel supply to the engine. Microswitches are located in the throttle box so that the throttle levers actuate the switches to shut the valves when the levers are at their aft end of travel. Pushing the levers forward automatically operates the switches to open the fuel cocks, which remain open during the normal operating range of the levers. Two distinct actions are required to actuate the switches again. The throttle lever must be pulled back to its aft position and a mechanical latch operated, or a detent (hard point) overcome, to allow the lever to travel further and shut off the fuel valve.

Jet engines are "thrust producing", meaning they produce thrust directly, so the levers are known as thrust levers. Propeller engines including turboprop engines are "power producing", meaning they produce power which is converted into thrust by the propeller. Levers in propeller aircraft are therefore known as "power levers", and are used in conjunction with "condition levers". Most piston-engine aircraft have a throttle knob instead.

== See also ==
- Index of aviation articles
- Autothrottle
- War emergency power
