= Amaimon language =

Madang language spoken in Papua New Guinea

Amaimon
- Mabulap
- Region: Madang Province, Papua New Guinea
- Native speakers: 1,800 (2003)
- Language family: Madang: Croisilles; Aiamom–Numagen; Amaimon
- Writing system: Latin

Language codes
- ISO 639-3: ali
- Glottolog: amai1246

Amaimon is a Papuan language spoken by 1,781 people (as of 2003) in Madang Province, Papua New Guinea. It is spoken in Amaimon (5.118286°S 145.409198°E), Transgogol Rural LLG.

== Writing system ==
A a	B b	D d	E e	G g	I i	J j	K k	L l	M m	N n
/ɑ/	/b/	/d/	/e/	/ɡ/	/i/	/dz/	/k/	/l/	/m/	/n/
Ng ng	O o	P p	R r	S s	T t	U u	W w	Y y	Z z	
/ɲ/	/o/	/p/	/ɾ/	/s/	/t/	/u/	/w/	/j/	/z/	
