= Robert Guba Aisi =

Papua New Guinean diplomat

Robert Guba Aisi is a Papua New Guinean diplomat. He is the former Permanent Representative (ambassador) of Papua New Guinea to the United Nations in New York. He presented his credentials to the Secretary General on June 25, 2002. Prior to being appointed to the United Nations, Aisi was Councillor of Papua New Guinea's Legal Training Institute.

Aisi obtained a Bachelor of Laws degree from the University of Papua New Guinea in 1979. The following year, he was admitted to the practice of law in both the National and Supreme Courts of Papua New Guinea. From 1986 to 1990, he was Principal Legal Officer to the regional authorities in Port Moresby. From 1990 to 1992, he was Principal Legal Officer and Deputy Commission Secretary to Papua New Guinea's Electricity Commission. He has also served with the Executive Branch (Legal Affairs) of UNESCO.

Aisi is also Honorary Consul of Papua New Guinea to South Africa, President of the Business Council of Papua New Guinea, and a member of the Australia-Papua New Guinea Business Council.

In February 2004, he was elected chairman of the United Nations' Special Committee on decolonization.

Addressing the United Nations Security Council on the topic of climate change in April 2007, Aisi said: "The dangers that the small island states and their populations face are no less serious than those nations threatened by guns and bombs."
