= Rai Coast languages =

New Guinean language family

Rai Coast
- South Madang
- Geographic distribution: Papua New Guinea
- Linguistic classification: Northeast New Guinea?: Madang; Central Madang; Rai Coast

Language codes
- ISO 639-3: –
- Glottolog: raic1241

The Rai Coast languages are a family of languages in the Madang stock of New Guinea.

Sidney Herbert Ray identified what was then known of the Rai Coast languages as a unit in 1919. They were linked with the Mabuso languages in 1951 by Arthur Capell in his Madang family.

== Languages ==
Though the validity of Rai Coast is well established, there are ongoing adjustments to membership and internal classification. Malcolm Ross added two languages to Rai Coast, Tauya and Biyom, from the small erstwhile Brahman branch of Madang.

The languages are as follows,

- Rai Coast
  - Pulabu
  - Evapia–Kabenau
    - Evapia River
      - Kow
      - Kesawai, Sausi
    - Kolom (Migum), Siroi
    - West Kabenau River: Arawum–Lemio, Dumpu
  - Brahman – Peka River
    - Brahman: Biyom, Tauya
    - Peka River
      - North: Sumau, Sop (Usino)
      - South: Danaru, Kobuga (= Urigina?)
  - Nuru River
    - Uya (Usu)
    - Kwato (Waube)
    - Lower Nuru River: Ogea (Erima), Uyaji–Amowe
  - Awung–Guabe Rivers
    - Awung River: Jilim, Among (= Rerau?)
    - Yangulam

Ross (2000, 2005) reconstructs pronouns for proto-Sub-Rai, which is more-or-less synonymous with Rai Coast as a whole, proto-Mindjim, proto-Yaganon, and proto-Kow–Usino.

== Bibliography ==
- Ross, Malcolm (2005). "Pronouns as a preliminary diagnostic for grouping Papuan languages". In Andrew Pawley; Robert Attenborough; Robin Hide; Jack Golson (eds.). Papuan pasts: cultural, linguistic and biological histories of Papuan-speaking peoples. Canberra: Pacific Linguistics. pp. 15–66. doi:10.15144/PL-572. ISBN 0858835622. OCLC 67292782.
- Ross, Malcolm. 2014. Proto-Rai-Coast. TransNewGuinea.org.
- Ross, Malcolm. 2014. Proto-Sub-Rai. TransNewGuinea.org.
- Z'graggen, J.A. A comparative word list of the Rai Coast languages, Madang Province, Papua New Guinea. D-30, xvi + 196 pages. Pacific Linguistics, The Australian National University, 1980. doi:10.15144/PL-D30
