= Tomul River =

River in Papua New Guinea

- Location within Papua New Guinea

Location
- Country: Papua New Guinea
- Region: Madang Province

Physical characteristics
- Source
  - location: Papua New Guinea
- Mouth
  - coordinates: 4°31′00″S 144°39′00″E

The Tomul River is a river in Madang Province, Papua New Guinea.

The Tomul River languages (Southern Adelbert languages) are spoken in the watershed.

== See also ==
- List of rivers of Papua New Guinea
- Josephstaal Rural LLG
