= Sogeram languages =

Family of languages in the Madang stock of New Guinea

Sogeram
- Sogeram River; Wanang
- Geographic distribution: Near the Sogeram River, Papua New Guinea
- Linguistic classification: Trans–New Guinea: Madang; West Madang; Southern Adelbert; Sogeram

Language codes
- Glottolog: soge1235

The Sogeram languages are a family of languages in the Madang stock of New Guinea. They are named after the Sogeram River.

In earlier classifications, such as that of Wurm, most of the Sogeram family were called "Wanang", after the Wanang River. The exceptions were Faita, placed as a separate branch of the Southern Adelbert languages, and Mum–Sirva (then called the "Sikan" family), which were classified with the other branch, Josephstaal (Tomul River).

== Languages ==
Daniels (2016) classifies the Sogeram languages in three branches, including some recently documented languages.

Sogeram

- West Sogeram (Wurm et al's "Atan" family)
  - Mand
  - Nend
- Central Segeram
  - Manat
  - Apalɨ
  - North Central Sogeram (Sikan): Mum, Sirva
- "East" Sogeram
  - Gants
  - Kursav
  - Aisian: Magɨ, Aisi

Daniels (2017), following Pawley, resolves the issue of Gants by classifying it as East Sogeram, closest to Kursav though he refrains from claiming the two languages form a clade. He notes that the name "East Sogeram" is no longer geographically appropriate, as Gants would be the westernmost Sogeram language.

Recently discovered Magɨyi may also be a Sogeram language, with the forms of identified cognates closest to Mum.

Because these languages form a chain, where each influences its neighbors, the branching of the family is not clear. Usher divides the languages in nearly the same way, differing only in the placement of Manat:

- Sogeram River
  - West Sogeram River
    - Atemple–Nend: Atemble (Atemple, Mand), Nend (Angaua)
    - Paynamar (Manat)
  - Central Sogeram River
    - Apali (Emerum)
    - Mum–Sirva: Mum (Katiati), Sileibi (Sirva)
  - South Sogeram River
    - Faita (Kulsab/Kursav)
    - Gants
    - Musak (Aisi)

=== Names ===
Below are Sogeram language names in Daniels (2015) compared to names listed in Z'graggen (1975), along with their respective meanings.

Daniels (2015)	meaning	Z'graggen (1975)	meaning
Mand	‘no’	Atemple	village name
Nend	‘no’	Angaua	demonym
Manat	‘no’	Paynamar	village name
Apalɨ	‘no’	Emerum	village name
Mum	‘what’	Katiati	village name
Sirva	language name	Sileibi	village name?
Magɨ	‘no’		
Aisi (Mabɨŋ)	‘why (no)’	Musak	village name
Kursav	language name	Faita	village name
Gants	language name	Gants	language name

== Proto-language ==
Proto-Sogeram
- Reconstruction of: Sogeram languages

A phonological reconstruction of Proto-Sogeram has been proposed by Daniels (2015).

=== Phonology ===
Proto-Sogeram phonemic inventory according to Daniels (2015):

*p	*t		*k	*kʷ <kw>
*β <v>	*s			
*m	*n	*ɲ <ñ>	*ŋ	
	*r			

*i	*ɨ	*u
	*a	

=== Pronouns ===
Daniels (2017) reconstructs the pronouns as follows:

	sg	pl
1	*ya	*a-ra
2	*na	*na-ra
3	*nu/*nɨ	*nɨ-ra

Compare Ross's proto-Madang singular pronouns *ya, *na, *nu/*ua.

=== Lexicon ===
Selected lexical reconstructions from Daniels (2015) are listed below.

Plant names
Proto-Sogeram	Gloss	Scientific name
*akwasa	betelnut	Areca catechu
*kari	betelnut	Areca catechu
*kasam	breadfruit	Artocarpus altilis
*kuimaŋ	coconut	Cocos nucifera
*mirkwa	cordyline	Cordyline fruticosa
*kunsa	yam	Dioscorea sp.
*mɨnta	sword grass	Imperata cylindrica
*mimpɨŋ	ironwood tree	Intsia bijuga
*makin	sago	Metroxylon sp.
*manɨŋ	banana	Musa sp.
*kamura	betel pepper	Piper betle
*akɨru	sugar	Saccharum officinarum
*sakai	bamboo	
*umai	bean	
*kɨñakw	paint tree	
*sukan	reed sp.	

Animal names
Proto-Sogeram	Gloss	Scientific name
*kɨñakuŋ	wattled brush-turkey	Aepypodius arfakianus
*siar	starling	Aplonis sp.
*kaiaŋki	sulphur-crested cockatoo	Cacatua galerita
*muiam	cassowary	Casuarius unappendiculatus
*ikakara	chicken	Gallus gallus
*kumpin	Victoria crowned pigeon	Goura victoria
*kwɨñaŋ	palm cockatoo	Probosciger aterrimus
*kukɨ	sago grub	Rhynchophorus ferrugineus
*aŋam	collared brush-turkey	Talegalla jobiensis
*kuyiv	bird-of-paradise	Paradisaeidae
*kariv	flying fox	Pteropus
*iŋkɨn	ground possum	Phalangeridae
*muŋmi	bee	
*kapa	bird	
*apapara	butterfly	
*kuntar	centipede	
*mavra	crocodile	
*upri	dog	
*kɨmparam	eel	
*iau	fish	
*kukasa	frog	
*naŋram	frog	
*iman	louse	
*kamɨŋaua	millipede	
*ñaŋkur	mosquito	
*iran	parrot species	
*urir	parrot species	
*sampaN	pig	
*sar	snake	
*takwɨ	snake	

=== Comparisons ===
The following is a comparative table of reconstructed forms in Proto-Sogeram and Proto-Northern Adelbert.

gloss	Proto-Sogeram	Proto-Northern Adelbert
breast	*aman ‘breast’	*men ‘breast’
cook in pot	*imu ‘put in pot’	*im- ‘boil, cook in pot’
see	*iŋka ‘see, perceive’	*ag- ‘see’
turn	*ir, irɨ- ‘turn, spin’	*girik- ‘turn’
fight	*kira ‘fight’	*war- ‘hit, fight’
bow	*kɨmi ‘bow’	*kemi ‘bow’
die	*kɨmu ‘die’	*um- ‘die’
walk, go	*kɨnta ‘walk’	*iduw- ‘go’
root	*kɨntɨr ‘root’	*durun ‘root’
roast	*kra ‘roast’	*id- ‘roast’
arm, hand	*kuman ‘arm, hand’	*waben ‘arm, hand’
centipede	*kuntar ‘centipede’	*wisir ‘centipede’
egg	*maŋka ‘egg’	*munag ‘egg’
husband	*-mum ‘husband’	*muŋ ‘husband, man’
eat	*ña ‘eat’	*an- ‘eat’
heavy, weight	*pɨm ‘weight’	*bin ‘heavy’
snake	*takwɨ ‘snake’	*duag ‘snake’
heart, liver	*umpaŋ ‘heart’	*gemaŋ ‘liver’
call	*ura ‘call out’	*par- ‘call’
