= Josephstaal Rural LLG =

Local-level government in Papua New Guinea

- Location within Papua New Guinea
- Coordinates: 4.739997°S 145.007991°E
- Country: Papua New Guinea
- Province: Madang Province
- District: Middle Ramu District

Area
  - Total: 2,642 km^{2} (1,020 sq mi)

Population (2021 Estimate)
  - Total: 30,538
  - Density: 11.56/km^{2} (29.94/sq mi)
- Time zone: UTC+10 (AEST)

Josephstaal Rural LLG is a local-level government (LLG) of Madang Province, Papua New Guinea.

== Wards ==
- 01. Ingawaia
- 02. Bogen
- 03. Osum
- 04. Avunmakai
- 05. Evuar
- 06. Mandugar
- 07. Arimbugor
- 08. Kisila / Simbar
- 09. Iabaranga
- 10. Kangarangat
- 11. Yamamuk
- 12. Inasi
- 13. Amjaivuvu
- 14. Angasa
- 15. Kaibugu
- 16. Ivarai
- 17. Kinbugor
- 18. Aragnam
- 19. Ambok
- 20. Kamambu
- 21. Sangur Sangur
- 22. Munimatamam
- 23. Atitau
- 24. Arimatau
- 25. Abasakul
- 26. Kokomasak

== See also ==
- Josephstaal languages
