= Trans–New Guinea languages =

Large Papuan language family

Trans–New Guinea
- Geographic distribution: Indonesia (Western New Guinea, East Nusa Tenggara (Alor, Pantar); East Timor; Papua New Guinea
- Linguistic classification: One of the world's primary language families
- Proto-language: Proto-Trans–New Guinea
- Subdivisions: Berau Gulf; Sumeri; Irian Highlands; Asmat–Mombum; Kayagar–Kolopom; Central West New Guinea; Oksapmin; Bosavi; Duna–Pogaya; Anim; Abom; Morobe – Eastern Highlands; Southeast Papuan

Language codes
- ISO 639-5: ngf
- Glottolog: nucl1709 Nuclear Trans–New Guinea
- The extent of various proposals for Trans–New Guinea. Families accepted by Usher Other families proposed by Ross (2005) Other Papuan languages Austronesian languages Uninhabited

The various families constituting Ross' conception of Trans–New Guinea. The greatest TNG diversity is in the eastern highlands. (After Ross 2005.)
Irian Jaya, W to E
South Bird's Head
West Trans–New Guinea
Kaure–Kapori
Pauwasi
Mek
Asmat–Kamoro
Awyu–Dumut
Ok
Kayagar
Marind
Kolopom
PNG highlands, W to E
Awin–Pa
East Strickland
Duna
Bosavi
Engan
West Kutubuan
East Kutubuan
Chimbu–Wahgi
Kainantu–Goroka
Madang
Finisterre–Huon
Southern PNG, E to W
Binanderean
Southeast Papuan
Angan
Eleman
Teberan
Turama–Kikorian
Kiwai–Porome
Inland Gulf
Gogodala–Suki
Tirio
isolates (Note: Mor, Tanah Merah, Dem, Uhunduni, Oksapmin, Wiru, Pawaia, Kamula, Moraori, Mombum)

Trans–New Guinea (TNG) is an extensive family of Papuan languages spoken on the island of New Guinea and neighboring islands, a region corresponding to the country Papua New Guinea as well as parts of Indonesia.

Trans–New Guinea is perhaps the third-largest language family in the world by number of languages. The core of the family is considered to be established, but its boundaries and overall membership are uncertain. The languages are spoken by around 3 million people. There have been several main proposals as to its internal classification.

== History of the proposal ==
Although Papuan languages for the most part are poorly documented, several of the branches of Trans–New Guinea have been recognized for some time. The Eleman languages were first proposed by S. Ray in 1907, parts of Marind were recognized by Ray and JHP Murray in 1918, and the Rai Coast languages in 1919, again by Ray.

The precursor of the Trans–New Guinea family was Stephen Wurm's 1960 proposal of an East New Guinea Highlands family. Although broken up by Malcolm Ross in 2005, it united different branches of what became TNG for the first time, linking Engan, Chimbu–Wahgi, Goroka, and Kainantu. Duna and Kalam were added in 1971. Then in 1970, Clemens Voorhoeve and Kenneth McElhanon noted 91 lexical resemblances between the Central and South New Guinea (CSNG) and Finisterre–Huon families, which they had respectively established a few years earlier. Although they did not work out regular sound correspondences, and so could not distinguish between cognates due to genealogical relationship, cognates due to borrowing, and chance resemblances, their research was taken seriously. They chose the name Trans–New Guinea because this new family was the first to span New Guinea, from the Bomberai Peninsula of western West Irian to the Huon Peninsula of eastern PNG. They also noted possible cognates in other families Wurm would later add to TNG: Wurm's East New Guinea Highlands, Binandere in the 'Bird's Tail' of PNG, and two families that John Z'graggen would later (1971, 1975) unite in his 100-language Madang–Adelbert Range family.

In 1975, Wurm accepted Voorhoeve and McElhanon's suspicions about further connections, as well as Z'graggen's work, and postulated additional links to, among others, the languages of the island of Timor to the west of New Guinea, Angan, Goilalan, Koiarian, Dagan, Eleman, Wissel Lakes, the erstwhile Dani-Kwerba family, and the erstwhile Trans-Fly–Bulaka River family (which he had established in 1970), expanding TNG into an enormous language phylum that covered most of the island of New Guinea, as well as Timor and neighboring islands, and included over 500 languages spoken by some 2,300,000 people. However, part of the evidence for this was typological, and Wurm stated that he did not expect it to stand up well to scrutiny. Although he based the phylum on characteristic personal pronouns, several of the branches had no pronouns in common with the rest of the family, or even had pronouns related to non-TNG families, but were included because they were grammatically similar to TNG. Other families that had typical TNG pronouns were excluded because they did not resemble other TNG families in their grammatical structure.

Given that grammatical typology is readily borrowed – many of the Austronesian languages in New Guinea have grammatical structures similar to their Papuan neighbors, for example, and conversely many Papuan languages resemble typical Austronesian languages typologically –, other linguists were skeptical. William A. Foley rejected Wurm's and even some of Voorhoeve's results, and he broke much of TNG into its constituent parts: several dozen small but clearly valid families, plus a number of apparent isolates.

In 2005, Malcolm Ross published a draft proposal re-evaluating Trans–New Guinea, and found what he believed to be overwhelming evidence for a reduced version of the phylum, based solely on lexical resemblances, which retained as much as 85% of Wurm's hypothesis, though some of it tentatively.

The strongest lexical evidence for any language family is shared morphological paradigms, especially highly irregular or suppletive paradigms with bound morphology, because these are extremely resistant to borrowing. For example, the fact that the German words gut "good" and besser "better" resemble their English counterparts is stronger evidence that German is related to English than the mere lexical correspondence between German rot and English red for the color. However, because of the great morphological complexity of many Papuan languages, and the poor state of documentation of nearly all, in New Guinea this approach is essentially restricted to comparing pronouns. Ross (as a first step) reconstructed pronoun sets for Foley's basic families and compared these reconstructions, rather than using a direct mass comparison of all Papuan languages, (as a second step) attempted to then reconstruct the ancestral pronouns of the Proto-Trans–New Guinea language, such as *ni "we", *ŋgi "you", *i "they", and (as a third step) then compared poorly supported branches directly to this reconstruction. Families required two apparent cognates to be included. However, if any language in a family was a match, the family was considered a match, greatly increasing the likelihood of coincidental resemblances, and because the plural forms are related to the singular forms, a match of 1sg and 1pl, although satisfying Ross's requirement of two matches, is not actually two independent matches, again increasing the likelihood of spurious matches. In addition, Ross counted forms like *a as a match to 2sg *ga, so that /ɡV, kV, ŋɡV, V/ all counted as matches to *ga. And although /n/ and /ɡ/ occur in Papuan pronouns at twice the level expected by their occurrence in pronouns elsewhere in the world, they do not correlate with each other as they would if they reflected a language family. That is, it is argued that Ross's pronouns do not support the validity of Trans–New Guinea, and do not reveal which families might belong to it.

Ross also included in his proposal several better-attested families for non-pronominal evidence, despite a lack of pronouns common to other branches of TNG, and he suggested that there may be other families that would have been included if they had been better attested. Several additional families are only tentatively linked to TNG. Because the boundaries of Ross's proposal are based primarily on a single parameter, the pronouns, all internal structure remains tentative.

== The languages ==
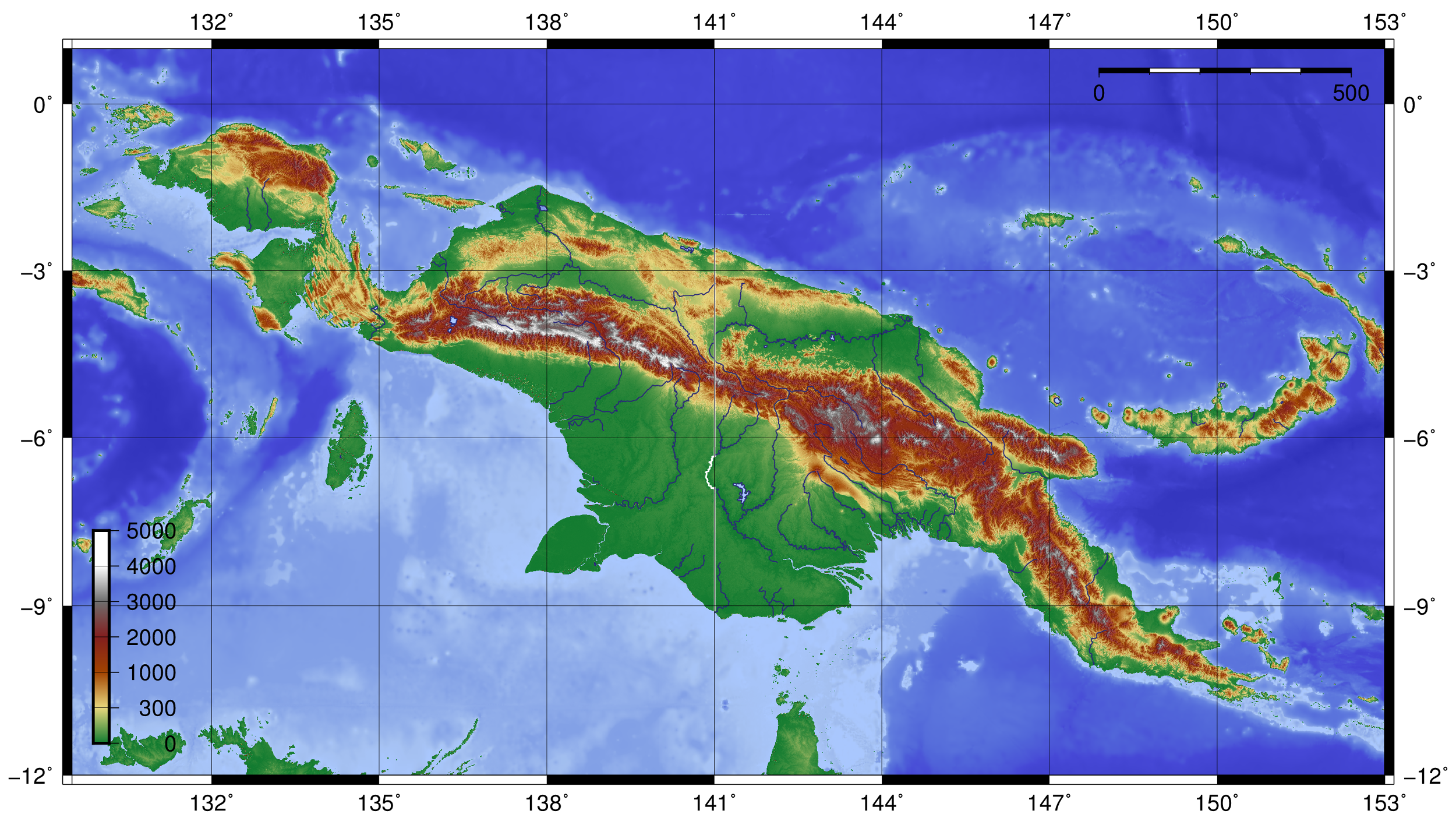
TNG is strongly associated with the New Guinea Highlands (red), and may have spread with the spread of highland agriculture starting c. 10,000 BP, probably in the east, and only more recently south of the highlands.

Most TNG languages are spoken by only a few thousand people, with only seven (Melpa, Kuman, Enga, Huli, Western Dani, Makasae, and Ekari) being spoken by more than 100,000. The most populous language outside of mainland New Guinea is Makasae of East Timor, with 100,000 speakers throughout the eastern part of the country. Enga is the most populous Trans-New Guinea language spoken in New Guinea, with more than 200,000 speakers. Golin, Sinasina, Central Grand Valley Dani, Kamano, and Bunaq have between 50,000 and 100,000 speakers (Galela of Halmahera, usually not classified as Trans-New Guinea, also has between 50,000 and 100,000 speakers.) All other Trans–New Guinea languages have fewer than 50,000 speakers.

The greatest linguistic diversity in Ross's Trans–New Guinea proposal, and therefore perhaps the location of the Trans–New Guinea homeland, is in the interior highlands of Papua New Guinea, in the central-to-eastern New Guinea cordillera, just where Wurm first posited his East New Guinea Highlands family. Indonesian Papua and the Papuan Peninsula of Papua New Guinea (the "bird's tail") have fewer and more widely extended branches of TNG, and were therefore likely settled by TNG speakers after the proto-language broke up.

Ross speculates that the TNG family may have spread with the high population densities that resulted from the domestication of taro, settling quickly in the highland valleys along the length of the cordillera but spreading much more slowly into the malarial lowlands, and not at all into areas such as the Sepik River valley where the people already had yam agriculture, which thus supported high population densities. Ross suggests that TNG may have arrived at its western limit, the islands near Timor, perhaps four to 4.5 thousand years ago, before the expansion of Austronesian into this area. Roger Blench associates the spread of Trans–New Guinea languages with the domestication of the banana.

== Classification ==
=== Wurm, Voorhoeve & McElhanon (1975) ===
Wurm et al. identify the subdivisions in their Papuan classification as families (on the order of relatedness of the Germanic languages), stocks (on the order of the Indo-European languages), and phyla (on the order of the Nostratic hypothesis). Trans-New Guinea is a phylum in this terminology. A language that is not related to any other at a family level or below is called an isolate in this scheme.

Trans–New Guinea phylum (Wurm et al. 1975)

('Family-level' groups are listed in **boldface**)

- ?**Oksapmin** isolate [inclusion dubious]
- **Morwap** isolate
- **Molof** isolate
- **Usku** isolate
- **Tofamna** isolate
- Eleman stock
  - **Eleman** family
  - **Purari** isolate (Koriki, Namau)
  - **Tate** isolate
- Inland Gulf stock
  - **Ipiko** isolate
  - **Minanibai** family (incl. Karami)
- Kaure stock
  - **Kaure** family
  - **Kapori** isolate
  - **Sause** isolate
- **Kolopom** (Frederik Hendrik Island) family
- **Nimboran** family
- **Goliath** family (Mek)
- Northern, or Border–Tor–Lake Plain super-stock
  - Border stock
    - **Waris** family
    - **Taikat** family
    - **Bewani** family
  - Tor – Lake Plain stock
    - **Tor** family
    - **Turu** family
    - **Central Lake Plain** family
    - **Uria** isolate
    - **Mawes** isolate
- Pauwasi stock
  - **Eastern** family
  - **Western** family (Dubu, Towei)
- **Senagi** family
- South Bird's Head (Vogelkop) stock
  - **South Bird's Head** family
  - **Inanwatan** family
  - **Konda–Yahadian** family
- Timor–Alor–Pantar stock
  - **Bunak** isolate
  - **Makasai** isolate
  - **Oirata** isolate
  - **Fataluku** (Dagodá) isolate
  - **Lovaea** isolate
  - **Kairui** isolate
  - **Alor–Pantar** family
- Teberan–Pawaian superstock
  - **Teberan** family
  - **Pawaia** isolate
- Turama–Kikorian stock
  - **Mena** or **Turama–Omatian** family
  - **Kairi (Dumu)** isolate
- Trans-Fly – Bulaka River superstock
  - **Bulaka River** family (Yelmek–Maklew)
  - Trans-Fly stock
    - **Kiwaian** family
    - **Tirio** family
    - **Eastern Trans-Fly** family
    - **Pahoturi River** family
    - **Morehead & Upper Maro Rivers** family:
      - Nambu subfamily
      - Tonda subfamily
      - Yey isolate
      - Moraori isolate
- Madang – Adelbert Range subphylum
  - Madang superstock
    - **Rai Coast stock**
      - **Evapia** family (Asas, Dumpu, Kesawai, Sausi, Sinsauru)
      - **Mindjim** family
      - **Kabenau** family (Arawum, Kolom, Siroi, Lemio, Pulabu)
      - **Yaganon** family
      - **Peka** family (Usino, Sumau, Urigina, Danaru)
      - **Nuru** family (Usu, Erima, Duduela, Kwato, Rerau, Jilim, Yangulam)
    - Mabuso stock
      - **Kare** isolate
      - **Kokon** family
      - **Gum** family
      - **Hanseman** family
  - Adelbert Range superstock
    - **Mugil** isolate
    - Isumrud stock
      - **Dimir** isolate
      - **Kowan** family
      - **Mabuan** family
    - Pihom stock
      - **Amaimon** isolate
      - **Kaukombaran** family
      - **Kumilan** family
      - **Numagenan** family
      - **Omosan** family
      - **Tiboran** family
    - Josephstaal stock
      - **Osum** isolate
      - **Wadaginam** isolate
      - **Sikan** family
      - **Pomoikan** family
    - Wanang stock
      - **Paynamar** isolate
      - **Atan** family (Atemble, Angaua)
      - **Emuan** family (Emerum, Musak)
    - **Brahman** family (membership per Z'graggen)
- Main Section:
  - Eastern TNG subphylum
    - Binandere stock
      - **Guhu-Semane** isolate
      - **Binandere** family
    - **Goilalan** family
    - **Koiarian** family
    - **Kwalean** family
    - **Manubaran** family
    - **Yareban** family
    - **Mailuan** family
    - **Dagan** family
  - Central and Western TNG subphylum
    - Finisterre-Huon superstock
      - Huon stock
        - **Kovai** isolate
        - **Eastern Huon** family
        - **Western Huon** family
      - Finisterre stock
        - **Erap** family
        - **Wantoat** family
        - **Gusap–Mot** family
        - **Warup** family
        - **Yupna** family
        - **Uruwa** family
        - **Abaga** isolate
    - East New Guinea Highlands stock
      - **Eastern** family (= Kainantu)
        - Gadsup–Auyana–Awa subfamily
        - Tairora subfamily
        - Owena isolate
      - **East-Central** family (= Goroka)
        - Gende (Bundi) isolate
        - Siane subfamily
        - Gahuku subfamily
        - Kamano subfamily
        - Fore subfamily
      - **Central** family (= Chimbu–Wahgi)
        - Chimbu subfamily
        - Wahgi subfamily
        - Jimi subfamily
        - Hagen subfamily
      - **West-Central** family (= Engan)
        - Enga subfamily
        - Huli isolate
        - Angal (Mendi)–Kewa subfamily
      - **Kalam** family
      - **Wiru** isolate
      - **Kenati** (Aziana) isolate
    - Central and South New Guinea – Kutubuan superstock
      - Kutubuan stock
        - **West Kutubu** family
        - **East Kutubu** family
      - Central and South New Guinea stock (in the Central Highlands and Arafura Coast)
        - **Bosavi** family
        - **East Strickland** family
        - **Awin–Pa** family
        - **Duna** or **Duna–Bogaya** family
        - **Ok** family
        - **Awyu–Dumut** family
        - **Asmat–Kamoro** family
        - **Somahai** isolate
        - **Mombum** family
    - **Angan** family
      - Angaataha isolate
      - Angan subfamily
    - Gogodala–Suki stock
      - **Suki** isolate
      - **Gogodala** family
    - Marind stock
      - **Boazi** family
      - **Marind** family
      - **Yaqay** family
    - **Kayagar** family
    - Sentani stock
      - **Sentani** family
      - **Demta** isolate
    - Dani or Dani–Kwerba stock
      - **Dani** family
      - **Kwerba** family
      - **Samarokena** isolate
      - **Saberi** isolate
    - **Dem** isolate
    - Wissel Lakes – Kemandoga stock
      - **Uhunduni (Amung)** isolate
      - **Ekagi–Wodani–Moni** family
    - Mairasi – Tanah Merah stock
      - **Mairasi** family
      - **Tanah Merah** isolate
    - West Bomberai stock
      - **Karas** isolate
      - **West Bomberai** family
    - **Mor** isolate

=== Foley (2003) ===
As of 2003, William A. Foley accepted the core of TNG: "The fact, for example, that a great swath of languages in New Guinea from the Huon Peninsula to the highlands of Irian Jaya mark the object of a transitive verb with a set of verbal prefixes, a first person singular in /n/ and second person singular in a velar stop, is overwhelming evidence that these languages are all genetically related; the likelihood of such a system being borrowed vanishingly small." He considered the linguistic relationship between the Finisterre–Huon, Eastern Highlands (Kainantu–Gorokan), and Irian Highlands (Dani – Paniai Lakes) families (and presumably some other smaller ones) to be established, and he said that it is "highly likely" that the Madang family belongs as well. He considered it possible, but not yet demonstrated, that the Enga, Chimbu, Binandere, Angan, Ok, Awyu, Asmat (perhaps closest to Ok and Awyu), Mek, Sentani, and the seven small language families of the tail of Papua New Guinea (Koiarian, Goilalan, etc., which he maintains have not been shown to be closely related to each other) may belong to TNG as well.

=== Ross (2005) ===
The various families constituting Malcolm Ross' conception of Trans–New Guinea. The greatest TNG diversity is in the eastern highlands. (After Ross 2005.): Irian Jaya, W to E South Bird's Head West Trans–New Guinea Kaure–Kapori Pauwasi Mek Asmat–Kamoro Awyu–Dumut Ok Kayagar Marind Kolopom / PNG highlands, W to E Awin–Pa East Strickland Duna Bosavi Engan West Kutubuan East Kutubuan Chimbu–Wahgi Kainantu–Goroka Madang Finisterre–Huon / Southern PNG, E to W Binanderean Southeast Papuan Angan Eleman Teberan Turama–Kikorian Kiwai–Porome Inland Gulf Gogodala–Suki Tirio isolates*; * Mor, Tanah Merah, Dem, Uhunduni, Oksapmin, Wiru, Pawaia, Kamula, Moraori, Mombum

Ross does not use specialized terms for different levels of classification as Donald Laycock and Stephen Wurm did. In the list given here, the uncontroversial families that are accepted by Foley and other Papuanists and that are the building blocks of Ross's TNG are printed in boldface. Language isolates are printed in italics.

Ross removed about 100 languages from Wurm's proposal, and only tentatively retained a few dozen more, but in one instance he added a language, the isolate Porome.

Ross did not have sufficient evidence to classify all Papuan groups. In addition, the classification is based on a single feature – shared pronouns, especially 1sg and 2sg – and thus is subject to false positives as well as to missing branches that have undergone significant sound changes, since he does not have the data to establish regular sound correspondences.

Unclassified Wurmian languages

Although Ross based his classification on pronoun systems, many languages in New Guinea are too poorly documented for even this to work. Thus there are several isolates that were placed in TNG by Wurm but that cannot be addressed by Ross's classification. A few of them (Komyandaret, Samarokena, and maybe Kenati) have since been assigned to existing branches (or ex-branches) of TNG, whereas others (Massep, Momuna) continue to defy classification.

- Kenati (→ Kainantu?)
- Komyandaret (→ Greater Awyu)
- Massep isolate
- Molof isolate
- **Momuna** family (2)
- Samarokena (→ Kwerba)
- Tofamna isolate
- Usku isolate

Reclassified Wurmian languages

Ross removed 95 languages from TNG. These are small families with no pronouns in common with TNG languages, but that are typologically similar, perhaps due to long periods of contact with TNG languages.

- Border and Morwap (Elseng), as an independent Border family (15 languages)
- Isirawa (Saberi), as a language isolate (though classified as Kwerba by Clouse, Donohue & Ma 2002)
- Lakes Plain, as an independent Lakes Plain family (19)
- Mairasi, as an independent Mairasi family (4)
- Nimboran, as an independent Nimboran family (5)
- Piawi, as an independent Piawi family (2)
- Senagi, as an independent Senagi family (2)
- Sentani (4 languages), within an East Bird's Head – Sentani family
- Tor and Kwerba, joined as a Tor–Kwerba family (17)
- Trans-Fly – Bulaka River is broken into five groups: three remaining (tentatively) in TNG (Kiwaian, Moraori, Tirio), plus the independent South-Central Papuan and Eastern Trans-Fly families (22 and 4 languages).

Trans–New Guinea phylum (Ross 2005)
- West Trans–New Guinea linkage ? [a suspected old dialect continuum]
  - West Bomberai – Timor–Alor–Pantar
    - **Timor–Alor–Pantar** families (22)
    - **West Bomberai** family (2)
  - **Paniai Lakes (Wissel Lakes)** family (5)
  - **Dani** family (13)
- **South Bird's Head (South Doberai)** family (12)
- **Tanah Merah (Sumeri)** isolate
- **Mor** isolate
- **Dem** isolate
- **Uhunduni** (Damal, Amungme) isolate
- **Mek** family (13)
- ? Kaure–Kapori (4) [Inclusion in TNG tentative. No pronouns can be reconstructed from the available data.]
  - **Kapori** isolate
  - **Kaure** family (3)
- ? **Pauwasi** family (4) [Inclusion in TNG tentative. No pronouns can be reconstructed from the available data. Since linked to Karkar, which is well attested and not TNG]
- **Kayagar** family (3)
- **Kolopom** family (3)
- **Moraori** isolate
- ? Kiwai–Porome (8) [TNG identity of pronouns suspect]
  - **Kiwaian** family (7)
  - **Porome (Kibiri)** isolate
- **Marind** family (6)
- Central and South New Guinea ? (49, reduced) [Part of the original TNG proposal. Not clear if these four families form a single branch of TNG. Voorhoeve argues independently for an Awyu–Ok relationship.]
  - **Asmat–Kamoro** family (11)
  - **Awyu–Dumut** family (8–16)
  - **Mombum** family (2)
  - **Ok** family (20)
- **Oksapmin** isolate [now linked to the Ok family]
- **Gogodala–Suki** family (4)
- **Tirio** family (4)
- **Eleman** family (7)
- **Inland Gulf** family (6)
- **Turama–Kikorian** family (4)
- ? **Teberan** family [inclusion in TNG tentative] (2)
- ? **Pawaia** isolate [has proto-TNG vocabulary, but inclusion questionable]
- **Angan** family (12)
- ? **Fasu (West Kutubuan)** family (1–3) [has proto-TNG vocabulary, but inclusion somewhat questionable]
- ? **East Kutubuan** family (2) [has proto-TNG vocabulary, but inclusion somewhat questionable]
- **Duna–Pogaya** family (2)
- **Awin–Pa** family (2)
- **East Strickland** family (6)
- **Bosavi** family (8)
- **Kamula** isolate
- **Engan** family (9)
- **Wiru** isolate (lexical similarities with Engan)
- **Chimbu–Wahgi** family (17)
- Kainantu–Goroka (22) [also known as East Highlands; first noticed by Capell 1948]
  - **Goroka** family (14)
  - **Kainantu** family (8)
- Madang (103)
  - Southern Adelbert Range–Kowan
    - **Kowan** family (2)
    - Southern Adelbert Range
      - Josephstaal (7)
        - **Osum (Utarmbung)** isolate
        - **Wadaginam** isolate
        - **Sikan** family (2)
        - **Pomoikan** family (3)
      - Wanang (5)
        - **Paynamar** isolate
        - **Atan** family (2)
        - **Emuan** family (2)
      - **Faita** isolate
  - Rai Coast–Kalam
    - **Rai Coast** family (31)
    - **Kalam** family (4; perhaps part of Rai Coast)
  - Croisilles linkage
    - Dimir-Malas (2)
    - Kaukombar (4)
    - Kumil (5)
    - Tibor-Omosa (6)
    - **Amaimon** isolate
    - Numugen-Mabuso
      - **Numugen** family (6)
      - **Mabuso** family (29)
- Finisterre–Huon (62) [part of the original TNG proposal. Has verbs that are suppletive per the person and number of the object.]
  - **Finisterre** family (41)
  - **Huon** family (21)
- ? **Goilalan** family (6) [inclusion in TNG tentative]
- Southeast Papuan (Bird's Tail) ? [these families have not been demonstrated to be related to each other, but have in common ya for 'you[plural]' instead of proto-TNG *gi]
  - **Koiarian** family (7)
  - **Kwalean** family (3)
  - **Manubaran** family (2)
  - **Yareban** family (5)
  - **Mailuan** family (6)
  - **Dagan** family (9)
- Binanderean (16)
  - **Guhu-Samane** isolate
  - **Binandere** family (15) [a recent expansion from the north]

=== Pawley and Hammarström (2018) ===
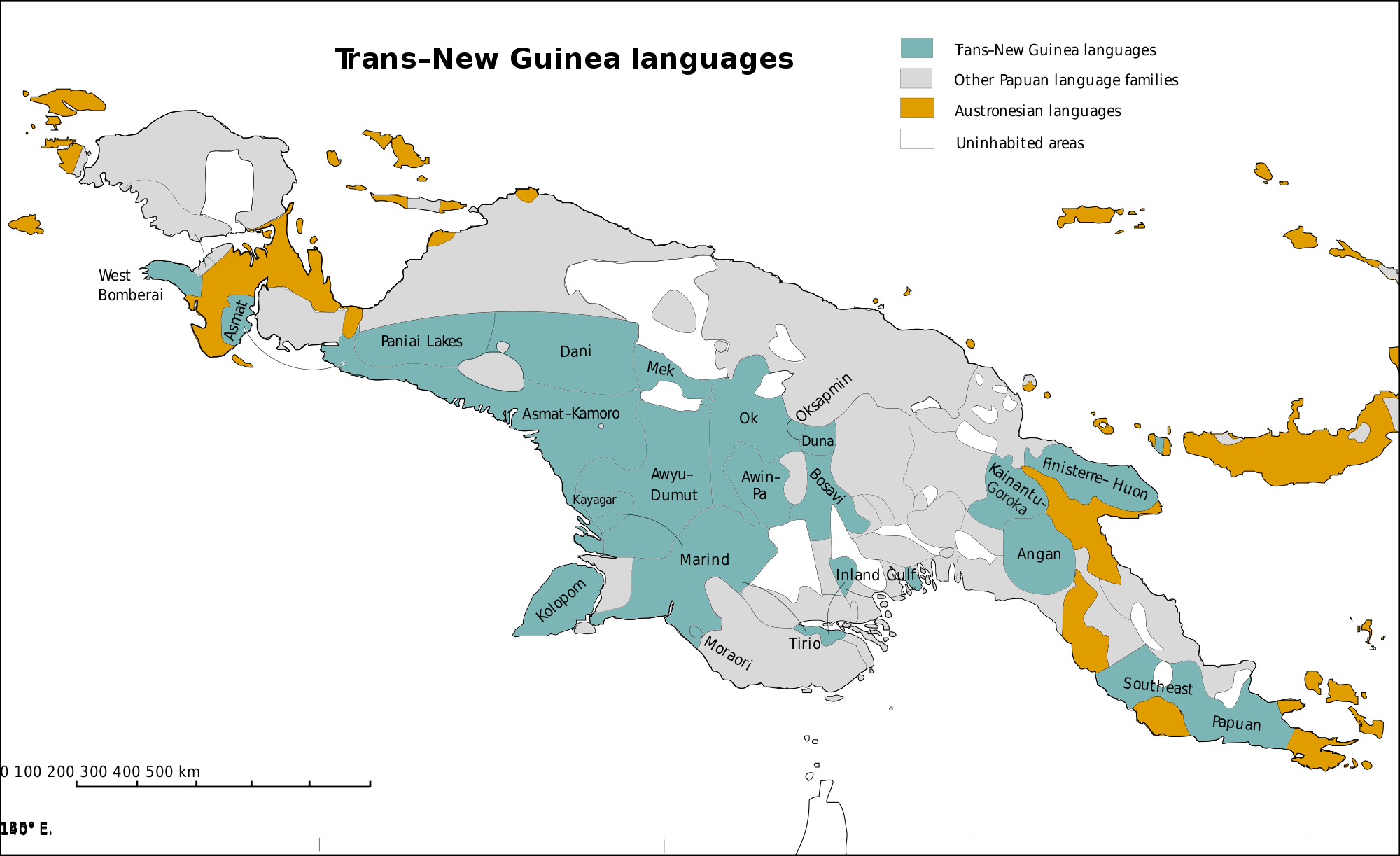
Languages accepted by both Pawley and Hammarström (2018) and Usher (2018).

Andrew Pawley and Harald Hammarström (2018) accept 35 subgroups as members of Trans-New Guinea.

Trans–New Guinea phylum (Pawley and Hammarström 2018)

Trans-New Guinea subgroups (strong evidence)
35 subgroups, 431 languages

- Madang (107)
- Finisterre-Huon (62)
- Kainantu-Goroka (29)
- Ok-Oksapmin (20)
- Anim (17)
- Chimbu-Wahgi (17)
- Greater Awyu (17)
- Enga-Kewa-Huli (14)
- Angan (13)
- Dani (13)
- Greater Binanderean (13)
- Asmat-Kamoro (11)
- Dagan (9)
- Mailuan (8)
- Bosavi (7)
- Koiarian (7)
- Mek (7)
- East Strickland (6)
- Kiwaian (6)
- Goilalan (5)
- Paniai Lakes (5)
- Yareban (5)
- Gogodala-Suki (4)
- Turama-Kikori (4)
- Kayagaric (3)
- Kolopom (3)
- Kutubu (3)
- Kwalean (3)
- West Bomberai (3)
- Awin-Pa (2)
- Duna-Bogaya (2)
- Manubaran (2)
- Somahai (2)
- Marori (isolate)
- Wiru (isolate)

Groups and isolates considered by Pawley and Hammarström (2018) as having weaker or disputed claims to membership in Trans-New Guinea (some of which they suggest may ultimately turn out to be Trans-New Guinea, but further evidence is needed):

- Bayono-Awbono (2)
- Komolom (Mombum) (2)
- Mairasi (3)
- Pauwasi (5)
- Pawaian (isolate)
- Sentanic (4)
- South Bird's Head (12)
- Tanah Merah (isolate)
- Teberan (2)
- Timor-Alor-Pantar (20+)
- Uhunduni (Damal) (isolate)

Groups and isolates sometimes classified as Trans-New Guinea, but rejected by Pawley and Hammarström (2018) as Trans-New Guinea:

- Dem (isolate)
- Eleman (5)
- Kaki Ae (isolate)
- Kamula (isolate)
- Kaure-Narau (2)
- Mor (isolate)
- Porome (isolate)
- Purari (isolate)

=== Glottolog 5.0 (2024) ===
Glottolog, of which Hammarström is one of the editors, accepts 10 groups as part of a Nuclear Trans–New Guinea family, based on Foley (2000), Pawley (2005) and Edgar Suter (1997).

- Madang (108 languages)
- Finisterre-Huon (61)
- Asmat-Awyu-Ok (49)
- Kainantu-Goroka (28)
- Chimbu-Wahgi (17)
- Enga-Kewa-Huli (14)
- Dani (13)
- Greater Binanderean (13)
- Mek (8)
- Paniai Lakes (5)

=== Dryer (2022) ===
Matthew Dryer used lexicostatistics to evaluate Pawley and Hammarström (2018), based on 40-word Swadesh list data from the ASJP database. Dryer concludes that the following language families are likely to be Trans–New Guinea. They are listed in order of highest to lowest score, i.e. starting with the most likely.

Dryer does not consider that evidence based solely on pronouns and the word for 'louse' is sufficient to conclude that a family is a member of Trans-New Guinea. This is because they are more likely to be an areal form (Wanderwort) in the case of the word for 'louse' or to be highly conservative in the case of pronouns. Dryer states that similarities solely in pronouns mean that the families are related but that the relationship is so distant as to be "undetectable".

Dryer notes that this is a preliminary quantitative analysis and only gives a rough prediction of the families that may or may not belong within Trans–New Guinea, and that the lexical similarities it is based on may be due to loanwords, areal forms (Wanderwörter) and so forth.

Families likely to be Trans–New Guinea (Dryer 2022)

- Madang
- Chimbu–Wahgi
- Awyu–Ok
- Enga–Kewa–Huli
- Kiwaian
- Finisterre–Huon
- Dagan
- Yareban
- Wiru
- Bayono–Awbono
- Paniai Lakes
- Turama–Kikorian
- Kainantu–Goroka
- Dani
- Angan
- Somahai
- East Strickland
- Koiarian
- Fuyug
- Fasu
- Gogodala–Suki
- Damal
- Manubaran
- Anim
- Greater Binanderean

(Pawley and Hammarström (2018) do not classify Bayono–Awbono and Damal as Trans–New Guinea.)

Dryer lists the following families as "borderline". They have a somewhat higher basic lexical similarity with Trans–New Guinea than with non-Trans–New Guinea families:

- Bosavi
- Goilalan
- South Bird's Head
- Timor–Alor–Pantar
- Fasu
- Bogaya
- Teberan

(Pawley and Hammarström (2018) do not classify South Bird's Head, Timor–Alor–Pantar or Teberan as Trans–New Guinea.)

Dryer lists the following families as less likely to be Trans–New Guinea. They have few basic vocabulary items in common with Trans–New Guinea:

- Mailuan
- Duna
- Asmat–Kamrau Bay
- Kwalean
- Kolopom
- West Bomberai
- Mek
- Elevala
- Moraori
- Kayagaric
- Mulaha

=== Usher & Suter (2024) ===
The established Trans–New Guinea families according to Usher (2024). Additional families may eventually prove to belong as well, as Usher has initially excluded any that don't have a regular reflex of the 2sg pronoun.

Timothy Usher and Edgar Suter, in consultation with Papuan language researchers such as William Croft, Matthew Dryer, John Lynch, Andrew Pawley, and Malcolm Ross, have reconstructed low-level constituents of Trans–New Guinea to verify, through the establishment of regular sound changes, which purported members truly belong to it, and to determine their subclassification. In many cases Usher has created new names for the member families to reflect their geographic location. Much of Usher's classification is accepted by Glottolog, though under different names. As of 2024, his classification is as follows, including correspondences to the names in earlier classifications. He expects to expand the membership of the family as reconstruction proceeds.

Trans–New Guinea phylum (Usher 2024)
- Berau Gulf
  - Mor
  - North Berau Gulf (= South Bird's Head)
    - Yabin
    - South Bird's Head (= nuclear South Bird's Head plus Inanwatan)
  - West Bomberai (incl. Timor–Alor–Pantar)
- Sumuri
- West Papuan Highlands (= Irian Highlands)
  - Amung–Dem
    - Amung (Uhunduni)
    - Dem
  - Balim Valley (= Dani)
  - Paniai Lakes
- Asmat – Muli Strait
  - Asmat – Kamrau Bay (= Asmat–Kamoro)
  - Muli Strait (= Mombum)
- Cook River – Kolopom
  - Cook River (= Kayagar)
  - Kolopom (incl. Moraori)
- Oksap (Oksapmin)
- Central West New Guinea
  - Digul River – Ok
    - Digul River (= Greater Awyu, incl. Bayono-Awbono)
    - Kamula – Elevala River (= Awin–Pa plus Kamula)
    - Ok
  - Momuna–Mek
    - Mek
    - Momuna
- Papuan Plateau (= Bosavi, incl. Dibiyaso)
- Duna–Bogaia
- Abom
- Fly River (Anim)
  - Inland Gulf
  - Lake Murray (= Boazi)
  - Lower Fly River (= Tirio)
  - Marind–Yakhai (= Marind)
- Eastern Highlands – Kratke Range
  - Eastern Highlands (= Kainantu–Goroka)
  - Kratke Range (= Angan)
- Finisterre–Huon
- Papuan Peninsula (Southeast Papuan)
  - Meneao Range (= Dagan)
  - Owen Stanley Range
    - Koiari – Managalas Plateau (= Koiarian)
    - Humene–Uare (= Kwalean)
    - Mount Brown (= Manubaran)
    - Cloudy Bay – Musa River
      - Bauwaki
      - Cloudy Bay (= Mailuan)
      - Musa River (= Yareban)

These branches may cluster together (the southwestern branches, for example, may group together), but the details are as yet unclear.

The primary branches of the Trans–New Guinea family of languages, per Usher (2024).

The families from the Ross and Glottolog classifications that are not included are Kaure, Pauwasi, Engan, Chimbu–Wahgi, Madang, Eleman, Kiwaian, Binanderean, Goilalan, and the several Papuan Gulf families. Usher only includes families that have a regular reflex of the 2sg pronoun, so there may be additional TNG families that have changed their pronouns.

== Lexical semantics ==
A number of colexification patterns (called 'semantic conflations' by Donald Laycock), particularly in the nominal domain, are commonly found among Trans–New Guinea languages:

- [man, husband]
- [woman, wife]
- [bird, bat]
- [hair, fur, feather, leaf]
- [tree, firewood, fire]
- [water, river]
- [bark, skin of animal, peel or skin of fruit]
- [bark, skin, body]
- [egg, fruit, seed; some other round objects, e.g. kidney, eye, heart]
- [hand, foreleg of quadruped, wing]
- [heart, seat of emotions]
- [blood, red]
- [garden, work], [to make gardens, to work]
- [joint, elbow, knee]
- [milk, sap, semen, white of egg, bone marrow]
- [nose, face]
- [teeth, internal mouth]
- [leg, foot, hindleg]
- [finger, toe]
- [father, owner; mother, owner]

== See also ==
- Indo-Pacific languages
- Proto-Trans-New Guinea reconstructions (Wiktionary)

== Bibliography ==
- Pawley, Andrew (1998). "The Trans New Guinea Phylum hypothesis: A reassessment". In Jelle Miedema; Cecilia Odé; Rien A.C. Dam (eds.). Perspectives on the Bird's Head of Irian Jaya, Indonesia. Amsterdam: Rodopi. pp. 655–90. ISBN 978-90-420-0644-7. OCLC 41025250.
- Pawley, Andrew (2005). "The chequered career of the Trans New Guinea hypothesis: recent research and its implications". In Andrew Pawley; Robert Attenborough; Robin Hide; Jack Golson (eds.). Papuan pasts: cultural, linguistic and biological histories of Papuan-speaking peoples. Canberra: Pacific Linguistics. pp. 67–107. ISBN 0-85883-562-2. OCLC 67292782.
- Ross, Malcolm (2005). "Pronouns as a preliminary diagnostic for grouping Papuan languages". In Andrew Pawley; Robert Attenborough; Robin Hide; Jack Golson (eds.). Papuan pasts: cultural, linguistic and biological histories of Papuan-speaking peoples. Canberra: Pacific Linguistics. pp. 15–66. doi:10.15144/PL-572. ISBN 0858835622. OCLC 67292782.
- Wurm, Stephen (1975). New Guinea Area Languages and Language Study, Volume 1: Papuan Languages and the New Guinea Linguistic Scene. Canberra: Dept. of Linguistics, Research School of Pacific Studies, Australian National University. OCLC 37096514. Archived from the original on 2010-06-20.
