= Yafi language =

Pauwasi language spoken in Indonesia

Yafi
- Zorop
- Native to: Indonesia
- Region: Western New Guinea: Warlef village, Senggi District, Keerom Regency
- Native speakers: 230 (2005)
- Language family: Pauwasi: East Pauwasi; Yafi

Language codes
- ISO 639-3: wfg
- Glottolog: yafi1240
- ELP: Yafi

Yafi, also known as Zorop, is an Eastern Pauwasi language of West New Guinea. It is spoken in Warlef village, Senggi District, Keerom Regency.

== Basic vocabulary ==
Below are some basic vocabulary words in Yafi.

Yafi basic vocabulary
gloss	Yafi
‘I’	nam
‘you (sg)’	nem
‘we’	nim
‘belly’	yalək
‘bird’	awe
‘black’	seŋgəri
‘blood’	mob
‘breast’	muam
‘come’	kwalopai
‘eat’	fer-
‘eye’	ji
‘foot’	fuŋi
‘give’	tipi
‘good’	kiap
‘hand’	jae
‘head’	məndai
‘hear’	fau
‘house’	nab
‘louse’	yemar
‘man’	Arab
‘mosquito’	yəŋkar
‘name’	jei
‘road’	mai
‘root’	fiŋgu
‘sand’	gərək
‘tooth’	jurai
‘tree’	war
‘water’	jewek
‘who’	waunap
‘one’	aŋgətəwam
‘two’	anəŋgar
