= Southern Adelbert languages =

Madang language family of Papua New Guinea

Southern Adelbert
- Sogeram and Tomul Rivers
- Geographic distribution: Papua New Guinea
- Linguistic classification: Northeast New Guinea?: Madang; West Madang; Southern Adelbert
- Subdivisions: Tomul (Josephstaal); Sogeram (Wanang)

Language codes
- ISO 639-3: –
- Glottolog: sout3148

The South Adelbert or Southern Adelbert Range languages are a family of languages in the Madang stock of New Guinea, spoken along the tributaries of the Ramu River in the watershed of the Adelbert Range.

== Languages ==
The languages are as follows.

- Tomul River (~ Josephstaal)
  - Osum (Utarmbung)
  - Wadaginam
  - Pomoikan: Anam (Pondoma), Anamgura (Ikundun) – Moresada
- Sogeram River (~ Wanang) (see)

In earlier classifications, such as that of Wurm, the Tomul River languages plus the Sikan languages were called "Josephstaal", while the rest of the Sogeram family was called "Wanang".
