= Yamben language =

Trans–New Guinea language

Yamben
- Yaben
- Region: Yambarik village, Sumgilbar Rural LLG, Madang Province, Papua New Guinea
- Language family: Trans–New Guinea: Madang; Central; Yamben

Language codes
- ISO 639-3: ynb
- Glottolog: yamb1257

Yamben, also spelled Yaben, is a Trans–New Guinea language of Madang Province, Papua New Guinea. It was first documented by Andrew Pick in the 2010s and classified by Pick (2019) as a probable primary branch of Madang, though its precise classification is still pending further research. Although surrounded by Croisilles languages, Yamben is not one of them.

Yamben (Yaben) was not previously noticed by other scholars due to confusion with the nearby language of the same name.

Yamben is spoken in the single village of Yambarik (4.771029°S 145.570102°E) in Imbab ward, Sumgilbar Rural LLG, and is reachable via a few hours' hike into the Adelbert Mountains from Tokain village.

== Phonology ==
Unlike other languages belonging to the Madang branch, Yamben has a palatal nasal consonant (/ɲ/) and a labialized velar consonant (also called "labiovelar") series.

== Basic vocabulary ==
Basic vocabulary in Yamben and nearby Croisilles languages:

gloss	Yamben	Yaben	Manep	Gabak	Barem
man	dambu	munanu	munu	mur	mamunden
name	buɲim	uɲim(u)	unim	vin	unim
fire	aŋgaji	muta	andup	akut	munduv
tree	aŋgan	namu	mundu	ŋam	wam
louse	aŋgun	gunu	gunu	igun	gun
bird	akiem	malʌgwanu	nambe	liweŋ	munuŋgan
house	mʷan	muɲi	amun	kaven	amun
tooth	ananji	nʌna	nanaŋ	anek	nanaŋ
head	kumu	tazi	kumu	daut	sa
eye	mambudum	magiɲo	musaŋ	mek	muaŋ
