= Kilibob and Manup =

Mythical brothers in the folklore of Papua New Guinea

Kilibob and Manup, also rendered Kulbob and Manub, are mythical brothers in the folklore of northeastern Papua New Guinea, especially in traditions recorded in southern Madang Province and on Karkar Island. In different versions they appear as creator beings, culture heroes, or culture makers. Their stories explain the origin of landmarks, trade routes, craft specializations, and inequalities in material wealth, and in some twentieth-century interpretations they were also used to explain the possession of manufactured goods by Europeans.

== Names and distribution ==
The names and roles of the pair vary by region. In a comparative survey of legends from the Madang area, John Z'graggen wrote that the myth was known in three main zones: the Madang town area from Bilbil and Karkar westward to Korak, the Schouten Islands and adjacent East Sepik mainland, and the Saidor area in eastern Madang Province.

Z'graggen noted that the names may change from place to place and may even be reversed. He therefore suggested that the story can be treated analytically as a myth of "two brother culture makers" rather than as a single fixed text with one canonical title. In his synopsis, the older brother is usually Manup or Manub and the younger brother Kulbob or Kilibob, although this is not true in every version.

On Karkar Island, the pair are usually called Kulbob and Manub. Romola McSwain described the Karkar version as a shared narrative core known in many villages, especially in Takia and Waskia, even though local tellings differ in detail.

== Narrative structure ==
Z'graggen divided the story into two broad phases. In the first phase, conflict begins through the wife of the older brother. In many versions the younger brother's decorated arrow lands near her, she asks that its design be copied onto her body, and the elder brother interprets the act as adultery. The younger brother is then attacked repeatedly and finally escapes into a tree, which is cut down and falls into the sea or a bay.

In the second phase, the younger brother reappears as a culture maker. From the fallen tree or from beneath the water he makes a canoe or ship and becomes the source of superior objects, techniques, and forms of wealth. In some versions he offers the older brother a choice between local and European goods; the older brother chooses bows, arrows, canoes, taro, and pigs rather than firearms, dinghies, rice, and canned food. This choice helps explain why Europeans possess ships, guns, and manufactured wealth while New Guineans retain older technologies and foods.

Z'graggen also recorded variants in which the younger brother releases white-skinned people and domesticated animals from bamboo containers, departs for the land of the white man, or causes islands and channels to take their present form during his voyages. In some versions the capsized canoe becomes Karkar Island and its outrigger Bagbag Island.

== Karkar traditions ==
In McSwain's Karkar account, Kulbob is associated with Mt. Kanagioi and Kulbob Bay on the southeastern coast of the island. Kulbob is described as a hunter and carver, while Manub is a fisherman. The crisis begins when Manub's wife persuades Kulbob to carve his identifying pattern on her thighs in exchange for his missing arrow. Other Karkar variants replace this episode with different acts, but the quarrel still centers on rivalry, sexual suspicion, and the breakdown of relations between the two brothers.

The conflict expands into fighting between the followers of the two brothers. Kulbob escapes into a ngaul tree in the form of a lizard. When the tree is finally felled into the bay, he constructs a great canoe and smaller craft from its wood. In one version, a large ship with a funnel and European goods rises from the water. Kulbob loads the vessel with valuable artifacts, animals, and food plants, releases beautiful young people from bamboo containers, and sails away; when Manub tries to imitate him, his canoes sink and their crews drown.

Karkar versions also connect the myth closely to landscape and place names. McSwain recorded traditions linking Sagantali stream, the dugong called ruipain, the rock Magirpain on the Bagabag coast, and the rocks at Bangpat to episodes in the story. The myth is therefore not only a narrative about the brothers but also a charter for remembered places, routes, and inherited knowledge about technology and exchange.

McSwain further recorded that Kulbob's travels distribute practical knowledge. In one episode he rewards a man called Buroi with gifts of food plants, house-building plans, canoe-building plans, and cooking instructions. In this form the myth explains how skills and resources came to be unevenly distributed across the region.

== Trade, cargo belief and Christianity ==
In the introduction to the special issue Children of Kilibob, Thomas G. Harding, David R. Counts, and Alice Pomponio described the Kilibob-Manup cycle as part of a wider Melanesian "two brothers" or "hostile brothers" complex. They wrote that some versions explain customary practices and local landmarks, while others explain why Australians and North Americans possess manufactured goods unavailable to Melanesians. They also linked the myth to a multicentered regional trading system that connected these societies.

Peter Lawrence treated the myth as central to southern Madang cosmology and cargo belief, and that he traced recognizable versions of it well beyond southern Madang itself. McSwain likewise argued that on Karkar the myth came to shape interpretations of European contact. She recorded traditions in which the arrival of large ships was understood as the possible return of Kulbob and Manub, and she described a syncretic identification of Kulbob with the Christian God or with Jesus.

McSwain also connected these interpretations with twentieth-century religious revivals and cargo cults on Karkar. According to her account, Karkar "theological experts" from the 1920s onward used Christian language and ritual in attempts to recover concealed knowledge and regain control over a changed colonial world.

== Scholarship ==
The myth has been a recurring subject in the anthropology of the Madang coast. Harding, Counts, and Pomponio treated it as one of the key intellectual traditions of northeast New Guinea and as part of a much larger mythic complex found elsewhere in Melanesia and beyond. Z'graggen analyzed its regional distribution and internal structure in his survey of New Guinea legends. McSwain examined Karkar versions in relation to landscape, colonial change, Christianity, and cargo belief.

In 1994, Pacific Studies devoted a special issue, Children of Kilibob: Creation, Cosmos, and Culture in Northeast New Guinea, to related myths and neighboring traditions. Rufus Pech later published a book-length study devoted to the myth.

== See also ==
- Cargo cult
- Karkar Island
- Melanesian mythology
