= Northern Adelbert languages =

Family of Languages

Northern Adelbert
- Adelbert Range – Isumrud Strait; Pihom–Isumrud
- Geographic distribution: Adelbert Range, Madang Province, Papua New Guinea
- Linguistic classification: Northeast New Guinea?: Madang; Central Madang; Northern Adelbert

Language codes
- Glottolog: grea1298 Greater Northern Adelbert croi1234 Croisilles

The Northern Adelbert or Pihom–Isumrud languages are a family of twenty languages in the Madang stock of New Guinea. The occupy the coastal northern Adelbert Range of mountains directly opposite Karkar Island, as opposed to the Southern Adelbert languages, another branch of Madang.

Malcolm Ross posited a "linkage" connecting the Northern Adelbert languages with the Mabuso languages, and named this group Croisilles /krɔɪˈsɪlz/, as the two families bracket Cape Croisilles (Northern Adelbert to the north, Mabuso to the south). However, Ross never claimed Croisilles was an actual language family, and other researchers have rejected the connection.

== Languages ==
There are approximately 20 Northern Adelbert languages.

Below is a comparison of Northern Adelbert language names in Pick (2020) and Z'graggen (1980). A few alternate names from Capell (1952) are also given.

Pick (2020)	Z'graggen (1980)	ISO 639-3
Amako	Korak	koz
Barem	Bunabun (Z'graggen 1980), Bunubun (Capell 1952)	buq
Bargam	Mugil	mlp
Bepour	Bepour	bie
Gavak	Dimir	dmc
Hember Avu	Musar (Z'graggen 1980), Amben (Petir et al 1996), Vanembere (Capell 1952)	mmi
Karian	Bilakura	bql
Kobol	Koguman	kgu
Kowaki	Kowaki	xow
Maia	Pila, Saki	sks
Maiani	Tani	tnh
Mala	Pay	ped
Miani	Tani (Z'graggen 1980), Banar (Capell 1952)	pla
Manep	Malas	mkr
Mauwake	Ulingan	mhl
Mawak	Mawak	mjj
Moere	Moere	mvq
Mokati	Wanambre	wnb
Pal	Abasakur	abw
Pamosu	Hinihon	hih
Parawen	Parawen	prw
Ukuriguma	Ukuriguma	ukg
Usan	Wanuma	wnu
Waskia	Waskia	wsk
Yaben	Yaben	ybm
Yarawata	Yarawata	yrw

== Classification ==
Croisilles was first posited by Malcolm Ross (1995), not as an actual language family, but as a linkage. It was a merger of Wurm's Pihom-Isumrud-Mugil and Mabuso stocks, each of which contained 25–30 languages. Pick (2017, 2020) and Usher reject the merger, and provisionally the inclusion of Mugil (Bargam), though Pick retains the name. Usher disambiguates the (non-Mabuso) family as 'Adelbert Range'.

=== Usher (2020) ===
Timothy Usher classifies the languages as follows.

- Adelbert Range – Isumrud Strait
  - Kowan (Isumrud Strait): Waskia, Korak (Amako)
  - (North) Adelbert Range
    - Yamben
    - Omosan (Omosa River): Pal (Abasakur), Kobol (Koguman)
    - Gilagil River (old Isumrud proper)
      - Dimir (Gavak)
      - [old Mabuan]: Brem (Bunabun), Malas (Manep)
    - Northwest Adelbert Range (Mount Pihom)
      - Kaukombar River: Mala (Pay), Miani (Maiani, Tani), Maia (Pila, Saki)
      - Kumil–Timper
        - Kumil River: Bepour, Mauwake (Ulingan), Moere
        - Tiboran River (Timper River): Musar; Wanambre; Kowaki, Mawak, Pamosu (Hinihon)
    - Mabulap–Numugen
      - Amaimon (Mabulap) isolate
      - Numugen River (see)

=== Pick (2020) ===
Below is Andrew Pick's (2020) classification of the Northern Adelbert languages.

- Northern Adelbert languages
  - Manep–Barem languages: Manep, Barem
  - Kumil–Tibor languages
    - Kumil languages: Mauwake, Bepour, Moere
    - Tibor languages: Pamosu, Hember Avu, Mokati, Mawak, Kowaki
  - Numugen languages: Usan, Karian, Yaben, Yarawata, Parawen, Ukuriguma
  - Kaukombar languages: Maia, Mala, Miani, Maiani
  - Gavak

=== Pick (2017) ===
A quite similar internal classification was worked out independently by Pick (2017). Pick could not establish regular sound correspondences with Kobol–Pal (Omosan) or Amaimon (Mabulap), and thus leaves them out of the family.

- Northern Adelbert
  - Kumil–Tibor (*t- > s, *p- > f, *ŋ > zero)
    - Tibor [*-n > zero, *a > e]
      - Mokati (Wanambre)
      - (*k- > h, *C- > [−voice]) Kowaki, Mawak, Pamosu, Hember Avu (Musar)
    - Kumil [*k- *t- > , *C- > [−voice], *-k > zero]: Bepour, Mauwake, Moere
  - Kaukombar [*k- *ŋ *-n > zero]: Mala, Miani, Maiani, Maia
  - Manep–Barem [*-ŋ > n, *-g > ŋ, *wV > u]
    - Manep (Malas)
    - Barem (Brem)
  - Gabak (Dimir)
  - Numugen (*ŋ > n, 6 languages)
  - Amako–Waskia: Waskia, Korak

Pick notes that Barem and Malas share pronominal markers on the verbs 'to teach' and 'to show' that are unique to those two verbs.

== Proto-language ==
Proto-Northern Adelbert
- Reconstruction of: Northern Adelbert languages

A phonological reconstruction of Proto-Northern Adelbert has been proposed by Pick (2020).

=== Phonology ===
Pick (2020) reconstructs the phonemes of Proto-Northern Adelbert as:

	labial	alveolar	palatal	velar
unvoiced stops	*p	*t		*k
voiced stops	*b	*d		*g
nasals	*m	*n		*ŋ
fricatives		*s		
laterals		*l		
rhotics		*r		
glides	*w		*y	

Four vowels are reconstructed by Pick (2020): *a, *e, *i, *u. Although Northern Adelbert languages usually have the five vowels /a e i o u/, Pick (2020) does not consider *o to be reconstructable.

=== Pronouns ===
The Proto-Northern Adelbert pronouns are:

	SG	PL
1	*ye	*yin
2	*ne	*nin
3	*we	*win

=== Lexicon ===
Selected lexical reconstructions from Pick (2020) are listed below.

Animal names
gloss	Proto-Northern Adelbert
ant	*mudir
ant sp.	*susur
bird	*muga(n/ŋ)
bird	*nebek
centipede	*wisir
chicken	*teteri
crayfish	*areker
crocodile	*tuar
eel	*melik
fly (insect)	*kuduruk
flying fox	*kepak
flying fox	*malabuŋ
frog	*idik
grasshopper	*takaw
grasshopper	*usa
hornbill	*baram
leech	*udir(a/e)m
louse	*gun
mosquito	*kasin
night bird	*mum
night bird of prey	*kilal
palm cockatoo	*k(a/e)kawin
pig	*buruk
pig, marsupial game animal	*wa
pitpit	*pia
snake	*duag
sunfly	*sisimur
Victoria crowned pigeon	*maur

Plant names
gloss	Proto-Northern Adelbert
aibika greens	*iruar
aibika greens	*maiw
bamboo	*bik
banana	*kudi
betel pepper vine	*kupi
breadfruit	*kidar
coconut	*keta
firefly	*magam
mango	*pai
mushroom	*mutar
sago	*kamar
stinging nettle (Tok Pisin: salat)	*k(u/a)bum
sugarcane	*kai
taro	*mam
tree	*ŋam
tree sp. (Tok Pisin: mangas)	*teber
tulip tree	*kuari
type of greens	*muduru

Material culture
gloss	Proto-Northern Adelbert
adze/axe	*ben
bow	*kemi
canoe	*wag
hand drum	*wag
house post	*bugaŋ
kundu drum	*kibem
loincloth	*siruw
platform, bed	*badim
signal drum, ironwood tree	*baner
spear	*uyaw
village	*kuaw

=== Comparisons ===
Below is a list of Proto-Northern Adelbert forms that are descended from Proto-Trans–New Guinea.

gloss	Proto-Northern Adelbert	Proto-Trans–New Guinea
arm, hand	*waben	*mbena
older brother	*bab	*[mb]amba
blood	*ked	*ke(nj,s)a
heart	*gemaŋ	*kamu
neck, nape	*kumaŋ	*kuma(n, ŋ)
mosquito	*kasin	*kasin
die	*um-	*kumV-
sleep	*in-	*kin(i,u)[m]-
know, hear, see	*ag- 'see'	*nVŋg-
NEG	*me (+verb)	*ma- (+verb)
water	*yag	*ok[V]
leaf	*tak	*sasak
