= Pamosu language =

Papuan language of Papua New Guinea

Pamosu
- Hinihon
- Native to: Papua New Guinea
- Region: Madang Province
- Native speakers: 1,800 (2012)
- Language family: Trans–New Guinea?: Madang; Croisilles; NW Adelbert Range; Tiboran; Upper; Pamosu

Language codes
- ISO 639-3: hih
- Glottolog: pamo1253

Pamosu is a Papuan language of Madang Province, Papua New Guinea. Some of the older generations speak Pal, a related language. It has been documented by Andrew Pick.

Pamosu grammar has been documented in Tupper (2012).

== Sources ==
- Tupper, Ian D. (2012). A grammar of Pamosu (Ph.D. thesis). La Trobe University. hdl:1959.9/565301.
