= Mokati language =

Tiboran language of Papua New Guinea

Mokati
- Wanambre
- Native to: Papua New Guinea
- Region: Madang Province
- Native speakers: 590 (2003)
- Language family: Trans–New Guinea?: Madang; Croisilles; NW Adelbert Range; Tiboran; Mokati

Language codes
- ISO 639-3: wnb
- Glottolog: wana1269

Mokati, or Wanambre after one of the villages in which it is spoken, is a Papuan language of Sumgilbar Rural LLG, Madang Province, Papua New Guinea.

There are two main dialects. One is spoken in Wanambre (4.76412°S 145.340466°E) and Mawet (4.748076°S 145.337669°E) villages, while another one is spoken in Tinami (4.774677°S 145.377246°E) and Kotakot (4.775134°S 145.378048°E) villages. Differences in vocabulary include Wanambre wena 'louse' Tinami nokalol 'louse'.
