= Metatypy =

Type of linguistic change due to language contact

Metatypy /mɪˈtætɪpi/ is a type of morphosyntactic and semantic language change brought about by language contact involving multilingual speakers. The term was coined by linguist Malcolm Ross.

== Description ==
Ross (1999: 7, 1) gives the following definition:

[Metatypy is a] change in morphosyntactic type and grammatical organisation [and also semantic patterns] which a language undergoes as a result of its speakers’ bilingualism in another language. This change is driven by grammatical calquing, i.e. the copying of constructional meanings from the modified language and the innovation of new structures using inherited material to express them. A concomitant of this reorganisation of grammatical constructions is often the reorganisation or creation of paradigms of grammatical functors.... Usually, the language undergoing metatypy (the modified language) is emblematic of its speakers’ identity, whilst the language which provides the metatypic model is an inter-community language. Speakers of the modified language form a sufficiently tightknit community to be well aware of their separate identity and of their language as a marker of that identity, but some bilingual speakers, at least, use the inter-community language so extensively that they are more at home in it than in the emblematic language of the community.

Ross (2002) identifies the following metatypic changes:

1. "reorganization of the language's semantic patterns and 'ways of saying things'"
2. restructuring of its syntax, the patterns of morphemes being concatenated to form
  - (i) sentences and clauses,
  - (ii) phrases
  - (iii) words

Ross finds that semantic reorganization occurs before syntactic restructuring. The syntactic changes occur in the order of (i) sentence/clause, (ii) phrase, and (iii) words.

Here are some languages that have undergone metatypy:

| Modified Language | Inter-community Language |
|---|---|
| Takia (Oceanic) | Waskia (Trans–New Guinea) |
| Anêm (East Papuan) | Lusi (Oceanic) |
| Arvanitic (Albanian, Indo-European) | Greek (Indo-European) |
| Mixe Basque | Gascon (Italic) |
| Phan Rang Cham (Malayo-Polynesian) | Vietnamese (Vietic) |
| Asia Minor Greek (Indo-European) | Turkish (Turkic) |
| Ilwana (Benue–Congo) | Orma (Cushitic) |
| Kupwar Kannada (Dravidian) | Kupwar Marathi (Indo-Iranian) |
| Tariana (Maipurean) | Tucanoan languages |
| Kupwar Urdu (Indo-Iranian) | Kupwar Marathi (Indo-Iranian) |

== Example ==
The example given by Ross (1999) is the "Papuanisation" of the Takia language (of the Oceanic family, western branch) because of influence from the neighbouring Waskia language (of the Madang family, Trans–New Guinea). In Ross' terminology, Takia is the modified language and Waskia is the inter-community language. Waskia, however, does not seem to have been significantly influenced by Takia. Both languages are spoken on Karkar Island.

The end result of the metatypic change leaves Takia usually having a word-for-word Waskia translation such as the following:

| English transl.: | "the man is hitting me" |
| Takia: | tamol | an | ŋai | i-fun-ag=da |
| | man | DET | me | he-hit-me=IMP |
| Waskia: | kadi | mu | aga | umo-so |
| | man | DET | me | hit-PRES.he |

The pairing of syntactic and semantic structures makes this word-for-word translation possible. Some of the grammatical changes that Takia has undergone include the following:

| Metatypic Change | Early Western Oceanic | | Papuanised Takia |
|---|---|---|---|
| word order: | SVO | → | SOV |
| non-deictic determiner: | precedes head noun | → | follows head |
| attributive noun: | precedes head | → | follows head |
| conjoined noun phrase: | Noun Phrase + Conjunction + Noun Phrase | → | Noun Phrase + Noun Phrase + Postposition |
| adposition: | preposition | → | postposition |

The diffusional changes of Takia are only in terms of metatypy: Takia has not altered its phonology and has virtually no loanwords borrowed from Waskia.

== See also ==
- Calque
- Mixed language
- Language change
- Language contact
- Loanword
- Multilingualism
- Language transfer
- Relexification
- Hybrid language (disambiguation)

== Sources ==
- Haspelmath, Martin (2004). "How hopeless is genealogical linguistics, and how advanced is areal linguistics?" (PDF). Studies in Language. 28 (1): 209–223. doi:10.1075/sl.28.1.10has. ISSN 0378-4177. OCLC 3404175. Archived from the original (PDF) on 2009-05-19.
- Ross, Malcolm D. (1996). "Contact-induced change and the comparative method: Cases from Papua New Guinea". In Mark Durie; Malcolm D. Ross (eds.). The comparative method reviewed: Regularity and irregularity in language change. New York: Oxford University Press. pp. 180–217. ISBN 978-0-19-506607-4. OCLC 31517888.
- Ross, Malcolm D. (1997). "Social networks and kinds of speech-community event". In R. Blench; Matthew Spriggs (eds.). Archaeology and language 1: Theoretical and methodological orientations. London: Routledge. pp. 209–261. ISBN 978-0-415-11760-9. OCLC 35673530.
- Ross, Malcolm D. (1999). "Exploring metatypy: How does contact-induced typological change come about?" (PDF). Archived from the original (Keynote talk, Australian Linguistic Society's annual meeting, Perth) on 2007-07-03.
- Ross, Malcolm D. (2001). "Contact-induced change in Oceanic languages in North-West Melanesia". In Alexandra Y. Aikhenvald; R. M. W. Dixon (eds.). Areal diffusion and genetic inheritance. Oxford: Oxford University Press. pp. 134–166. ISBN 978-0-19-829981-3. OCLC 46601107.
- Ross, Malcolm D. (2002). "Constructions: Continuity and contact". Archived from the original (PostScript file) on 2005-01-06.
- Ross, Malcolm D. (2003). "Diagnosing prehistoric language contact". In Raymond Hickey (ed.). Motivations for language change. Cambridge: Cambridge University Press. pp. 174–198. ISBN 978-0-521-79303-2. OCLC 49650031.
- Ross, Malcolm D. (2006). "Metatypy". In K. Brown (ed.). Encyclopedia of language and linguistics (2nd ed.). Oxford: Elsevier. ISBN 978-0-08-044299-0. OCLC 61441874.
- Ross, Malcolm D.; John Natu Paol (1978). A Waskia grammar sketch and vocabulary. Canberra: Dept. of Linguistics, Research School of Pacific Studies, Australian National University. ISBN 978-0-85883-174-2. OCLC 4524381.
