= PRW =

PRW, or prw, may refer to:

- Paso Robles Wine Services, a multi-winery processing and warehouse facility located in Paso Robles, California.
- PRW Racing, a defunct NASCAR auto racing team
- PRW, the IATA code for Prentice Airport, Wisconsin, US
- prw, the ISO 639-3 code for the Parawen language of Papua New Guinea
- PRW, the National Rail code for Perranwell railway station, Cornwall, UK
- Psychological Research Wing, a former name for the Defence Institute of Psychological Research in India

See also
