= Mauwake language =

Papuan language of Madang, Papua New Guinea

Mauwake
- Ulingan
- Native to: Papua New Guinea
- Region: Madang Province
- Native speakers: 2,400 (2003)
- Language family: Trans–New Guinea?: Madang; Croisilles; NW Adelbert Range; Kumil; Mauwake

Language codes
- ISO 639-3: mhl
- Glottolog: mauw1238
- Coordinates: 4.52°S 145.39°E

Mauwake (Mawake), or Ulingan, is a Papuan language spoken in Almami Rural LLG, Madang Province, Papua New Guinea. It is spoken in several villages along the north coast of Madang province, which lies in the north-east of Papua New Guinea.

== Distribution ==
There are 15 villages where Mauwake is the main language, seven of them on or near the coast along a stretch of 15 km between the Kumil and Nemuru rivers, and up to 12 km inland from the coast. Malala (4.448866°S 145.352317°E) and Ulingan (4.497247°S 145.41731°E) in Almami Rural LLG are the main Mauwake villages. Mauwake is principally spoken about 120 km northwest of Madang town, an area of about 100 square kilometres.

Dialects areas are:

- Ulingan dialect (in Ulingan (4.497247°S 145.41731°E), Sikor (4.503364°S 145.420288°E), and Meiwok (4.492829°S 145.442382°E) villages)
- Papur dialect (in Papur (4.560006°S 145.326806°E), Tarikapa (4.555722°S 145.347333°E), and Yeipamir (4.504228°S 145.331185°E) villages)
- Muaka dialect (in Muaka (4.507623°S 145.385719°E), Moro (4.446617°S 145.375342°E), Mereman (4.457343°S 145.393632°E), Sapara, Aketa (4.496816°S 145.341679°E), Amiten (4.456563°S 145.352507°E) / Susure / Wakoruma (4.448866°S 145.352317°E), and Saramun (4.52564°S 145.377131°E) villages)

== History ==
Mauwake speakers generally agree that the language migrated to Madang from further inland; a fact supported by the compacted diversity of the coastal area in particular, as well as by the comparatively minor role in Mauwake culture of fishing, which focuses more on gardening for both food and profit. Though not a uniform group socially or politically, Mauwake society typically follows a patrilineal tradition. Villages are based around a system of extended families and clans, with adoption as a common practice.

The Madang area was strongly affected by the Second World War, when it was occupied by Japanese soldiers and consequently bombed by Allied forces. Although the Japanese forces were not hostile to the local people, their presence was uneasy, and many fled inland. Prior to the war, the majority of external contact had been with missionaries. At the end of the war, and after contact with both the Japanese and Allied military forces, many Mauwake speakers left to work afield, with broadened horizons. This was helped by the establishment of a local high school, as well as a new highway along the north coast.

== Phonology ==
Though it does not exhibit the simplest phonological system of the Papuan languages, Mauwake has a small phonological spread, with only 14 consonants and 5 vowels. It also lacks the glottal stop that is typical of many Papuan languages.

Consonant phonemes of Mauwake
	Bilabial		Alveolar		Palatal	Velar	
Stop	p	b	t	d		k	ɡ
Nasal	m		n				
Fricative	ɸ		s				
Trill			r				
Lateral			l				
Approximant	w				j		

The voiced alveolar trill /r/ [r] occurs in free variation with the voiced alveolar tap [ɾ] in word-initial, medial and final positions. While in many Papuan languages, [r] and [l] are allophonic, in Mauwake they are contrastive, except for in a few words such as /eliwa/ [eˈliva] ~ [eˈriva] ‘good’, possibly due to dialectal variation.

The approximants /w/ and /j/ both show allophonic realisation. The alveo-palatal semivowel /j/ is realised as [ʒ] instead of [j] in the inland and Ulingan dialects.

Vowel phonemes of Mauwake
	Front	Central	Back
High	i		u
Mid	e		o
Low		a	

When followed by the central vowel /a/, or preceded by a word-initial consonant, /i/ and /u/ are realised as the open allophones [ɪ] and [ʊ] respectively. All vowels are contrastive in word-initial, medial and final positions, and length is phonemically contrastive in word-initial syllables.
