= Karian language =

Papuan language of Papua New Guinea

Karian
- Bilakura
- Native to: Papua New Guinea
- Region: Madang Province
- Native speakers: 34 (2007)
- Language family: Trans–New Guinea?: Madang; Croisilles; Numugen; Karian

Language codes
- ISO 639-3: bql
- Glottolog: bila1257 Karen
- ELP: Bilakura
- Bilakura is classified as Critically Endangered by the UNESCO Atlas of the World's Languages in Danger.

Karian (Karen), also called Bilakura, is a nearly extinct Papuan language of Madang Province, Papua New Guinea. It is spoken in Boia and Barto villages. Some speakers also live in Malas, a Manep-speaking village.
