= Kowan languages =

Small family of languages spoken in Papua New Guinea

Kowan
- Isumrud Strait
- Geographic distribution: Isumrud Strait, Madang Province
- Linguistic classification: Northeast New Guinea?: Madang; Croisilles; Isumrud; Kowan
- Subdivisions: Waskia; Korak

Language codes
- Glottolog: kowa1247

The Kowan languages are a small family of languages spoken in the Adelbert Range area of Madang Province, Papua New Guinea, and first identified by Malcolm Ross.

The languages are Waskia, with 20,000 speakers, and Korak, with 500.
