= Barem language =

Isumrud language spoken in Papua New Guinea

Barem
- Kambuar
- Bunabun
- Native to: Papua New Guinea
- Region: Sumgilbar Rural LLG, Madang Province
- Native speakers: 1,200 (2003)
- Language family: Trans–New Guinea?: Madang; Croisilles; Isumrud; Dimir–Malas; Barem

Language codes
- ISO 639-3: buq
- Glottolog: brem1238

Barem (Brem), also known as Bunabun (Bububun, Bunubun), is a Papuan language of Sumgilbar Rural LLG, Madang Province, Papua New Guinea.

== Dialects ==
Barem dialects are:

- Qkuan Kambuar (severely endangered, with only a few speakers around the Dibor River and in Tokain village (4.715575°S 145.633995°E), a Waskia-speaking town)
- Kimbu Kambuar (extinct)
- Murukanam Barem, spoken in Murukanam village north of the Dibor river (4.628687°S 145.564185°E)
- Asumbin, spoken in Asumbin village, Bunbun ward north and inland from Gildipasi (4.610883°S 145.494897°E)
- Bunabun (spoken north of the Dibor River near the coast, including in Bunabun (4.593247°S 145.532458°E))
