= Pila language =

Pila may refer to:

- Yom language or Pilapila, is a Gur language of Benin.
- Maia language, a Papuan language of Madang Province, Papua New Guinea
