= YBO =

YBO or ybo may refer to:

- YBO, the IATA code for Bob Quinn Lake Airport, British Columbia, Canada
- ybo, the ISO 639-3 code for Yabong language, Papua New Guinea
