= MVQ =

MVQ or mvq may refer to:

- MVQ, the former call sign for television station STQ in Mackay, Queensland, Australia
- MVQ, the IATA code for Mahilyow Airport, Mogilev, Belarus
- mvq, the ISO 639-3 code for Moere language, Papua New Guinea
