= Mawak language =

Papuan language of Papua New Guinea

Mawak
- Native to: Papua New Guinea
- Region: Madang Province
- Native speakers: (25 cited 2000)
- Language family: Trans–New Guinea?: Madang; Croisilles; NW Adelbert Range; Tiboran; Upper; Mawak

Language codes
- ISO 639-3: mjj
- Glottolog: mawa1266
- ELP: Mawak
- Mawak is classified as Critically Endangered by the UNESCO Atlas of the World's Languages in Danger.

Mawak is a nearly extinct Papuan language of Madang Province, Papua New Guinea.
