= Ukuriguma language =

Papuan language of Papua New Guinea

Ukuriguma
- Native to: Papua New Guinea
- Region: Madang Province
- Native speakers: 170 (2003)
- Language family: Trans–New Guinea?: Madang; Croisilles; Numugen; Ukuriguma

Language codes
- ISO 639-3: ukg
- Glottolog: ukur1240
- ELP: Ukuriguma

Ukuriguma is a Papuan language of Papua New Guinea.
