= Waskia language =

Papuan language of Papua New Guinea

Waskia
- Region: Papua New Guinea
- Native speakers: 20,000 (2007)
- Language family: Trans–New Guinea?: Madang; Croisilles; Isumrud; Kowan; Waskia

Language codes
- ISO 639-3: wsk
- Glottolog: wask1241

Waskia (Vaskia, Woskia) is a Papuan language of Papua New Guinea. It is spoken on half of Karkar Island, and a small part of the shore on the mainland, by 20,000 people; language use is vigorous. The Waskia share their island with speakers of Takia, an Oceanic language which has been restructured under the influence of Waskia, which is the inter-community language. Waskia has been documented extensively by Malcolm Ross and is being further researched by Andrew Pick.

Waskia is spoken in Tokain (4.715575°S 145.633995°E), a village in Malas ward, Sumgilbar Rural LLG on the coast of mainland New Guinea, and on Karkar Island, with the island and mainland varieties being lexically divergent from each other.

== Phonology ==
=== Consonants ===
		Labial	Alveolar	Palatal	Velar
Plosive	voiceless	p	t		k
Plosive	voiced	b	d		ɡ
Fricative			s		
Nasal		m	n		ŋ
Approximant		w	l	j	
Trill			r		

/ɡ/ can be pronounced as a fricative [ɣ] when in intervocalic positions.

=== Vowels ===
	Front	Central	Back
High	i		u
Mid	e		o
Low		a	

== Comparisons ==
Below are some Waskia lexical forms compared with Amako and Proto-Northern Adelbert.

gloss	Waskia	Amako	Proto-Northern Adelbert
hornbill	baram	bar	*baram
pig	buruk	bur	*buruk
sit	–	beng-	*bug-
year	barat	–	*barat
skin	guang	–	*guaŋ
thick	gurum	uŋur	*gurum
liver	gomang	gom	*gemaŋ
turn	gira-	girka-	*girik-
breadfruit	–	kid	*kidar
banana	–	kud	*kudi
lime	kaur	ka	*kapur
day, sun	kam	–	*kam
nape	komang	kumandup	*kumaŋ
plate	tawir	taw	*tabir
LOC	te	te	*te
rain	tiwik	tiv	*t(e/i)ik
