= Sumgilbar Rural LLG =

Local-level government in Papua New Guinea

- Location within Papua New Guinea
- Coordinates: 4.818469°S 145.771952°E
- Country: Papua New Guinea
- Province: Madang Province
- District: Sumkar District

Area
  - Total: 1,502 km^{2} (580 sq mi)

Population (2021 Estimate)
  - Total: 54,914
  - Density: 36.56/km^{2} (94.69/sq mi)
- Time zone: UTC+10 (AEST)

Sumgilbar Rural LLG is a local-level government (LLG) of Madang Province, Papua New Guinea.

== Wards ==
- 01. Bunbun (Hember Avu and Brem language speakers)
- 02. Erenduk (Brem language speakers)
- 03. Murukanam (Brem language speakers)
- 04. Malas (Manep and Waskia language speakers)
- 05. Imbab (Yamben language speakers)
- 06. Mirap (Gavak language speakers)
- 07. Karkum (Gavak language speakers)
- 08. Sarang (Takia language speakers)
- 09. Basken (Gavak language speakers)
- 10. Budum (Garuz language speakers)
- 11. Garup (Bargam language speakers)
- 12. Megiar (Bargam language speakers)
- 13. Biranis (Bargam language speakers)
- 14. Liksal (Bargam language speakers)
- 15. Barag / Aronis (Bargam language speakers)
- 16. Bunu No.1 (Bargam language speakers)
- 17. Kudas (Bargam language speakers)
- 18. Wasab (Bargam language speakers)
- 19. Burbura (Garuz language speakers)
- 20. Bagildik (Garuz language speakers)
- 21. Deda
- 22. Bomasse
- 23. Bandimfok (Garuz language speakers)
- 24. Asiwo (Garuz language speakers)
- 25. Abab (Garuz language speakers)
- 26. Dimert (Gavak language speakers)
- 27. Bilakura (Gavak language/Garuz language speakers)
- 28. Embor (Hember Avu language speakers)
- 29. Perene
- 30. Katekot
- 31. Hinihon
