= Numugen languages =

Numugen
- Numagen River
- Geographic distribution: Numagen River, New Guinea
- Linguistic classification: Trans–New Guinea?: Madang; Northern Adelbert; Numugen

Language codes
- ISO 639-3: –
- Glottolog: numu1240

The Numugen (Numagen) languages are a small family of closely related languages in the Madang branch of the Trans–New Guinea languages (TNG) phylum of New Guinea, spoken in the region of the Numagen River.

The languages are:

Usan (Wanuma), Karian (Bilakura), Yaben, Yarawata, Parawen, Ukuriguma

== Proto-language ==
For a list of Proto-Numugen reconstructions, see Pick (2020).
