= Sumkar District =

- Location within Papua New Guinea
- Coordinates: 4.652°S 145.977°E
- Country: Papua New Guinea
- Province: Madang Province
- Capital: Karkar Island
- LLGs: List: Sumgilbar Rural LLG; Karkar Rural LLG

Area
  - Total: 1,936 km^{2} (747 sq mi)

Population (2024 census)
  - Total: 121,254
  - Density: 62.63/km^{2} (162.2/sq mi)
- Time zone: UTC+10 (AEST)

Sumkar District is a district in the north of Madang Province in Papua New Guinea. It is one of the six administrative districts that make up the province. Sumkar is a district which is made up of Karkar Island and part of mainland NCR.
