= Yarawata language =

Papuan language of Papua New Guinea

Yarawata
- Native to: Papua New Guinea
- Region: Madang Province
- Native speakers: 130 (2003)
- Language family: Trans–New Guinea?: Madang; Croisilles; Numugen; Yarawata

Language codes
- ISO 639-3: yrw
- Glottolog: yara1250
- ELP: Yarawata
- Yarawata is classified as Severely Endangered by the UNESCO Atlas of the World's Languages in Danger

Yarawata is a Papuan language of Papua New Guinea.
