= Tani language =

Tani may refer to:

- one of the Tani languages (Sino-Tibetan) of the Indian Himalayas
- the Maiani language (Austronesian) of Papua New Guinea

== See also ==
- Tani (disambiguation)
