= GGL =

GGL may refer to:

- Aeronáutica (Angola), an Angolan airline
- Gajar Gola railway station, in Pakistan
- Gamma-glutamyltransferase 5, an enzyme
- Gander Green Lane, a football stadium in the London Borough of Sutton
- Ganglau language, spoken in Madang Province, Papua New Guinea
- GGL domain, a protein domain
- Goodricke Group Limited, a tea-producing company in West Bengal
