= Hember Avu language =

Papuan language of Papua New Guinea

Hember Avu
- Aregerek
- Musar
- Native to: Papua New Guinea
- Region: Madang Province
- Native speakers: (1,500 cited 2000)
- Language family: Trans–New Guinea?: Madang; Croisilles; NW Adelbert Range; Tiboran; Hember Avu

Language codes
- ISO 639-3: mmi
- Glottolog: musa1265

Hember Avu, also Aregerek, Musar or Amben, is a Papuan language of Sumgilbar Rural LLG, Madang Province, Papua New Guinea.

== Distribution ==
Hember Avu is spoken in seven villages:

- Salemben (4.710629°S 145.408306°E)
- Erinduk (4.649225°S 145.461903°E)
- Sevan (4.679431°S 145.443655°E)
- Erek Erek (4.714899°S 145.455956°E)
- Nagemak
- Kumbu (4.693571°S 145.384719°E)
- Embor (4.732267°S 145.358081°E)
