= Saep language =

Madang language of Papua New Guinea

Saep
- Native to: Papua New Guinea
- Region: Madang Province
- Native speakers: 550 (2003)
- Language family: Trans–New Guinea?: Madang; Yaganon; Saep

Language codes
- ISO 639-3: spd
- Glottolog: saep1240

Saep is a Madang language spoken in Madang Province, Papua New Guinea.

== Orthography ==
Letters (uppercase)	A	B	D	E	F	G	H	I	K	L	M	N		O	P	S	T	U	W	Y
Letters (lowercase)	a	b	d	e	f	g	h	i	k	l	m	n	ng	o	p	s	t	u	w	Y
IPA	/ɑ/	/b/	/d/	/e/	/ɸ/	/g/	/h/	/i/	/k/	/l/	/m/	/n/	/ŋ/	/o/	/p/	/s/	/t/	/u/	/w/	/j/
