= Kowaki language =

Extinct Papuan language

Kowaki
- Native to: Papua New Guinea
- Region: Madang Province
- Native speakers: (25 cited 2000)
- Language family: Trans–New Guinea?: Madang; Croisilles; NW Adelbert Range; Tiboran; Upper; Kowaki

Language codes
- ISO 639-3: xow
- Glottolog: kowa1245
- ELP: Kowaki
- Kowaki is classified as Critically Endangered by the UNESCO Atlas of the World's Languages in Danger.

Kowaki is a nearly extinct Papuan language of Madang Province, Papua New Guinea.
