= USAN (disambiguation) =

USAN or Usan may refer to:

== Organizations ==
- Union of South American Nations
- United States Adopted Name
- United States Navy

== Places ==
- Usan-guk, a Korean state that existed in the first millennium AD

== Other uses ==
- Usan language, a Madang language of Papua New Guinea
