= Kobol language =

Madang language spoken in Papua New Guinea

Kobol
- Koguman
- Region: Madang Province, Papua New Guinea
- Native speakers: (720 cited 2000 census)
- Language family: Trans–New Guinea?: Madang; Croisilles; Omosan; Kobol

Language codes
- ISO 639-3: kgu
- Glottolog: kobo1248

Kobol, or Koguman, is a Papuan language of Madang Province, Papua New Guinea.
