= Tani =

Tani may refer to:

- Tani (letter), a letter in the Georgian scripts
- Tani people, a group of tribes in Arunachal Pradesh, India
- Tani languages, a group of Tibeto-Burman (Sino-Tibetan) languages spoken in Arunachal Pradesh, India
- Maiani language, also known as Tani, a language of Papua New Guinea
- Tani (surname), a Japanese surname
- Tani District, a district in Khost Province, Afghanistan
  - Tani, Khost, capital of the district
- Tani, Prasat a sub-district of Prasat District in Surin Province, Thailand

== People ==
- Tani Adewumi (born 2010), Nigerian-American chess player
- Tani Cohen-Mintz, Israeli basketball player
- Nuh Ismail Tani, former chief of staff of the Somaliland Armed Forces.

== See also ==
- Tani language (disambiguation)
- Nang Tani, a ghost in Thai folklore
- Tanni Grey-Thompson (born 1969), British athlete
