= Dumun =

Dumun may be,

- Dumun language
- Al-Dumun village, Palestine
