= Melanesian =

Melanesian is the adjectival form of Melanesia. It may refer to:

- Melanesians
- Melanesian mythology
- Melanesian languages
