= Bagabag =

Bagabag may refer to:

- Bagabag, Nueva Vizcaya, a 3rd class municipality in the province of Nueva Vizcaya, Philippines
- Bagabag (Papua New Guinea), an island in the Madang-Province of Papua New Guinea
