= Bepour language =

Papuan language

Bepour
- Native to: Papua New Guinea
- Region: Madang Province
- Ethnicity: 340 (2000 census)
- Native speakers: (50 cited 2000)
- Language family: Trans–New Guinea?: Madang; Croisilles; NW Adelbert Range; Kumil; Bepour

Language codes
- ISO 639-3: bie
- Glottolog: bepo1240
- ELP: Bepour
- Bepour is classified as Severely Endangered by the UNESCO Atlas of the World's Languages in Danger.

Bepour is a nearly extinct Papuan language of Madang Province, Papua New Guinea.
