= Dumun language =

Endangered Madang language of Papua New Guinea

Dumun
- Bai (?)
- Native to: Papua New Guinea
- Region: Madang Province
- Native speakers: (120 cited 2000 census)
- Language family: Trans–New Guinea?: Madang; Yaganon?; Dumun

Language codes
- ISO 639-3: dui
- Glottolog: dumu1246 Dumun baim1246 Bai-Maclay
- ELP: Dumun
- Dumun is classified as Critically Endangered by the UNESCO Atlas of the World's Languages in Danger.

Dumun is an endangered Madang language spoken in Madang Province, Papua New Guinea.

Dumun is reported to go by the name Bai, but evidently this is a distinct (though related) language, or at least a variety called Bai recorded by Maclay was distinct.
