= Pal language =

Language

Pal
- Abasakur
- Region: Madang Province, Papua New Guinea
- Native speakers: (1,200 cited 2000 census)
- Language family: Trans–New Guinea?: Madang; Croisilles; Omosan; Pal

Language codes
- ISO 639-3: abw
- Glottolog: pall1244

Pal is a Papuan language of Madang Province, Papua New Guinea.
