= Numagen River =

River in Papua New Guinea

Numagen River Numugen River
- Location within Papua New Guinea

Location
- Country: Papua New Guinea
- Region: Madang Province

Physical characteristics
- Source
  - location: Papua New Guinea
- Mouth
  - coordinates: 5°02′16″S 145°10′40″E

The Numagen River or Numugen River is a river in Madang Province, Papua New Guinea.

Numagen languages are spoken in the area.

== See also ==
- List of rivers of Papua New Guinea
