= Cape Croisilles =

Cape in Papua New Guinea

- Location within Papua New Guinea

Geography
- Location: Papua New Guinea
- Coordinates: 4.85033°S 145.7951°E

Administration
- Papua New Guinea
- Province: Madang Province

Cape Croisilles /krɔɪˈsɪlz/ is a cape in Madang Province, Papua New Guinea. The Croisilles languages are named after the cape.

== See also ==
- Croisilles languages
