= Central Coast Wine Services =

Wine warehouse in California

Coordinates: 34.910711°N 120.450094°W

- Location: Santa Maria, California, US
- Appellation: Santa Maria Valley
- Formerly: Central Coast Wine Warehouse
- Founded: 1988
- First vintage: 1988
- Key people: Chris Brown (winemaker), Jim Lunt (General Manager), Steve Miller (Owner), Nicholas Miller (Owner)
- Known for: Lane Tanner, Core, Paul Lato, Herman Story, McPrice Meyers, Costa de Oro, clos Pepe, J. Wilkes, Conway Vineyards, Kunin, Sans Permis
- Varietals: Pinot noir, Syrah, Chardonnay, Merlot, Grenache
- Tasting: not open to public
- Website: http://www.centralcoastwineservices.com

Central Coast Wine Services is a multi-winery processing and warehouse facility located in Santa Maria, California, United States. Founded in 1988, Central Coast Wine Services serves as a warehouse facilities for wineries throughout the Central Coast (California) and includes a custom crush facility as well as bottling line and winemaking equipment rental. The company owns a branch location in Paso Robles. As of 2007, the facility was assisting in the production for over 40 different wine labels, including The Hitching Post wine label of the restaurant featured in the 2004 American film Sideways.

== History ==
The Central Coast Wine Services was founded in 1988 by the Miller family as a warehouse facility for wineries in Santa Barbara and San Luis Obispo counties to store their finished cases of bottled wine. Over the years the firm has expanded into a variety of wine making services including: custom crushing of grapes, custom winemaking, bottling, and bonded wine-making production space rental.

== Industry ==
The Central Coast Wine Services and its branch location, the Paso Robles Wine Services, are in a small peer group of wineries whose primary business is custom production for other wine labels, rather than producing wine for a label they own. Other such facilities include: Napa Wine Company, Sonoma Wine Company, Courtside Cellars, and Golden State Vinters.

These types of facilities are an American twist on various wine cooperatives such as KWV and Saint-Victor-la-Coste. They differ in that they are privately owned by the customers of the facilities and each has its own label. They are similar in that they utilize the same equipment (crusher-destemmers, wine presses, and stainless steel cooperage) and are often associated with a particular region's enological development.

== Facility ==
The Central Coast Wine Services is the home to 40 different labels. That represents approximately one third of the labels in Santa Barbara county. Owing to the concentration of wineries in the facility, it has become a center for other wine industry service providers such as Vinquiry.

=== Capacity of the Facility ===
- Current Square footage of facility: 250,000
- Stainless Steel Storage: 1,800,000 US gallons (6,800 m^{3})
- Case Good Storage: 485,000 cases
- Bottling capacity: 3,000 cases per day
- Barrel storage: 10,000+ barrels
- Press capacity: 600 short tons (540 t) per day
- Certified scale: 70-foot (21 m) truck scale and 5000 lbs. "bin" scale
- A P Facilities: Approximately 40 individual wineries

== Media References ==
The Hitching Post restaurant and winery features prominently in the movie Sideways. The Hitching Post Wine is produced by Frank Ostini and Gray Hartley at the Central Coast Wine Services.
