= Yaganon River =

River in Papua New Guinea

- Location within Papua New Guinea

Location
- Country: Papua New Guinea
- Region: Madang Province

Physical characteristics
- Source
  - location: Papua New Guinea
- Mouth
  - coordinates: 5°32′16″S 146°10′03″E

The Yaganon River is a river in northern Papua New Guinea.

== See also ==
- List of rivers of Papua New Guinea
- Yaganon languages
