= Moere language =

Papuan language of Papua New Guinea

Moere
- Native to: Papua New Guinea
- Region: Madang Province
- Native speakers: (50 cited 2000)
- Language family: Trans–New Guinea?: Madang; Croisilles; NW Adelbert Range; Kumil; Moere

Language codes
- ISO 639-3: mvq
- Glottolog: moer1240
- ELP: Moere

Moere is a nearly extinct Papuan language of Madang Province, Papua New Guinea.
