= Mala language (Papua New Guinea) =

Papuan language of Papua New Guinea

Mala
- Pay
- Native to: Papua New Guinea
- Region: Madang Province
- Native speakers: 1,400 (2003)
- Language family: Trans–New Guinea?: Madang; Croisilles; Northwest Adelbert Range; Kaukombar; Mala

Language codes
- ISO 639-3: ped
- Glottolog: mala1494

Mala, or Pay, is a Papuan language of Madang Province, Papua New Guinea.
