= Isumrud Strait =

- Isumrud Strait in PNG
- Location: Papua New Guinea, Madang Province
- Coordinates: 4.82°S 145.88°E
- Islands: Karkar Island

Isumrud Strait is the strait separating Karkar Island from mainland New Guinea in Madang Province, Papua New Guinea. It's 500 km from Port Moresby.

== See also ==
- Isumrud Strait languages
