= Amako language =

Madang language spoken in Papua New Guinea

Korak
- Amako
- Native to: Papua New Guinea
- Region: Madang Province
- Native speakers: 510 (2003)
- Language family: Trans–New Guinea?: Madang; Croisilles; Isumrud; Kowan; Korak

Language codes
- ISO 639-3: koz
- Glottolog: kora1296

Amako, or Korak, is a Papuan language of Papua New Guinea. It is spoken in Korak (4.522907°S 145.470316°E), Almami Rural LLG, Madang Province.
