= Yabong language =

Madang language of Papua New Guinea

Yabong
- Native to: Papua New Guinea
- Region: Madang Province
- Native speakers: (1,500 cited 2000 census)
- Language family: Trans–New Guinea?: Madang; Yaganon; Yabong

Language codes
- ISO 639-3: ybo
- Glottolog: yabo1240

Yabong is a Madang language spoken in Madang Province, Papua New Guinea.
