= Yaganon languages =

Sub-group of Madang languages in Papua New Guinea

Yaganon
- Yaganon River
- Geographic distribution: New Guinea
- Linguistic classification: Madang: East Madang; Yaganon

Language codes
- Glottolog: yaga1258

The Yaganon languages are a small family of closely related languages in New Guinea. They were linked with the Rai Coast languages in 1951 by Arthur Capell in his Madang family, but separated out again by Timothy Usher. The family is named after the Yaganon River.

== Languages ==
Along with Wasembo, the Yaganon languages form the East branch of the Madang language family.

- East Madang
  - Wasembo
  - Yaganon River: Ganglau, Saep, Yabong

Dumun is apparently also Yaganon, and the extinct Bai-Maclay may have been related to Dumun.
