= Usan language =

Madang language spoken in Papua New Guinea

Usan
- Wanuma
- Native to: Papua New Guinea
- Region: Madang Province
- Native speakers: (1,400 cited 1991)
- Language family: Trans–New Guinea?: Madang; Croisilles; Numugen; Usan

Language codes
- ISO 639-3: wnu
- Glottolog: usan1239

Usan, or Wanuma, is a Papuan language of Papua New Guinea.
