= Ganglau language =

Madang language spoken in Papua New Guinea

Ganglau
- Native to: Papua New Guinea
- Region: Madang Province
- Native speakers: 470 (2003)
- Language family: Trans–New Guinea?: Madang; Yaganon; Ganglau

Language codes
- ISO 639-3: ggl
- Glottolog: gang1270

Ganglau is a Madang language spoken in Madang Province, Papua New Guinea.
