= Iabu Rural LLG =

Local-level government in Papua New Guinea

- Location within Papua New Guinea
- Coordinates: 4.078°S 145.034°E
- Country: Papua New Guinea
- Province: Madang Province
- District: Bogia District

Area
  - Total: 84.04 km^{2} (32.45 sq mi)

Population (2021 Estimate)
  - Total: 6,280
  - Density: 74.7/km^{2} (194/sq mi)
- Time zone: UTC+10 (AEST)

Iabu Rural LLG is a local-level government (LLG) of Madang Province, Papua New Guinea.

== Wards ==
- 01. Baliau Ward
- 02. Dangale
- 03. Koalang
- 04. Boakure
- 05. Abaria
- 06. Warisi
- 07. Dugulaba
- 08. Budua
- 09. Madauri
- 10. Waia
- 11. Jogari
- 12. Yassa
- 13. Kuluguma
- 14. Boda
- 15. Boisa
