= Yaben language =

Papuan language of Papua New Guinea

Yaben
- Yamben
- Native to: Papua New Guinea
- Region: Madang Province
- Native speakers: (1,090 cited 2000 census)
- Language family: Trans–New Guinea?: Madang; Croisilles; Numugen; Yaben

Language codes
- ISO 639-3: ybm
- Glottolog: yabe1255

Yaben, also spelled Yamben, is a Papuan language of Papua New Guinea.
