= Timper River =

River in Papua New Guinea

- Location within Papua New Guinea

Location
- Country: Papua New Guinea
- Region: Madang Province

Physical characteristics
- Source
  - location: Papua New Guinea
- Mouth
  - coordinates: 4°43′04″S 145°28′44″E

The Timper River is a river in northern Papua New Guinea.

== See also ==
- List of rivers of Papua New Guinea
- Tiboran River languages / Timper River languages
