= Wasembo language =

Madang language of Papua New Guinea

Wasembo
- Native to: Papua New Guinea
- Region: Madang Province
- Native speakers: (830 cited 2000 census)
- Language family: Trans–New Guinea?: Madang; East Madang; Wasembo

Language codes
- ISO 639-3: gsp
- Glottolog: wase1252

Wasembo, also known as Biapim, Gusap, and Yankowan, is a Madang language spoken in Madang Province, Papua New Guinea. Usher classifies it as being closest to the Yaganon languages.
