= Parawen language =

Papuan language of Papua New Guinea

Parawen
- Para
- Native to: Papua New Guinea
- Region: Madang Province
- Ethnicity: 760 (2000 census)
- Native speakers: (430 cited 1981)
- Language family: Trans–New Guinea?: Madang; Croisilles; Numugen; Parawen

Language codes
- ISO 639-3: prw
- Glottolog: para1307

Parawen is a Papuan language of Papua New Guinea.

== Phonology ==
Parawen has a small phonemic inventory of nine consonants and three vowels.

Parawen consonant inventory
| | | Labial | Alveolar | Palatal | Velar |
|---|---|---|---|---|---|
| Stop | voiceless | | /t/ | | /k/ |
| Stop | voiced | /b/ | /d/ | | /g/ |
| Nasal | | /m/ | /n/ | | |
| Glide | | /w/ | | /j/ | |

An epenthetic vowel, generally /ɑ/ but /u/ if the preceding vowel is also /u/, which is usually inserted following a word-final consonant. /b/ is devoiced to [p] word-finally, even when an epenthetic vowel follows. /t/ is realised as [s] adjacent to /i/, and /d/ is [r] post-vocalically.

Parawen vowels
| | Front | Back |
|---|---|---|
| High | /i/ | /u/ |
| Low | | /ɑ/ |
