= Almami Rural LLG =

Local-level government in Papua New Guinea

- Country: Papua New Guinea
- Province: Madang Province
- District: Bogia District

Area
  - Total: 1,400 km^{2} (540 sq mi)

Population (2021 Estimate)
  - Total: 47,731
  - Density: 34/km^{2} (88/sq mi)
- Time zone: UTC+10 (AEST)

Almami Rural LLG is a local-level government (LLG) of Madang Province, Papua New Guinea.

== Wards ==
- 01. Ambana
- 02. Lilau (Lilau language speakers)
- 03. Gawat
- 04. Wangor (Maia Speakers)
- 05. Suaru (Maia Speakers)
- 06. Dumudum (Maia Speakers)
- 07. Turutapa (Maia Speakers)
- 08. Urumarav (Maia Speakers)
- 09. Milalimuda (Maia Speakers)
- 10. Aidibal (MALA/ALAM Language Speakers)
- 11. Turupuav
- 12. Murusapa
- 13. Wadaginam
- 14. Sirikin
- 15. Wagimuda
- 16. Yavera
- 17. Yakiba
- 18. Mugumat
- 19. Yoro Suvat
- 20. Dugumor (Mala/Alam Speakers)
- 21. Busip ( MALA/ALAM Speakers)
- 22. Simbine
- 23. Malala (Mauwake/MALA language speakers)
- 24. Amiten
- 25. Aketa
- 26. Aleswaw
- 27. Manugar
- 28. Gugubar
- 29. Erewanem
- 30. Ulatapun
- 31. Tarikapa
- 32. Muaka
- 33. Korak (Korak language speakers)
- 34. Ulingan (Mauwake language
- 35.TOBENAM (MALA/ALAM Language Speakers

speakers)[6]

- 36. Toto
- 37. Medebur
