= Bagabag (Papua New Guinea) =

Island in Papua New Guinea

Coordinates: 4.798°S 146.233°E

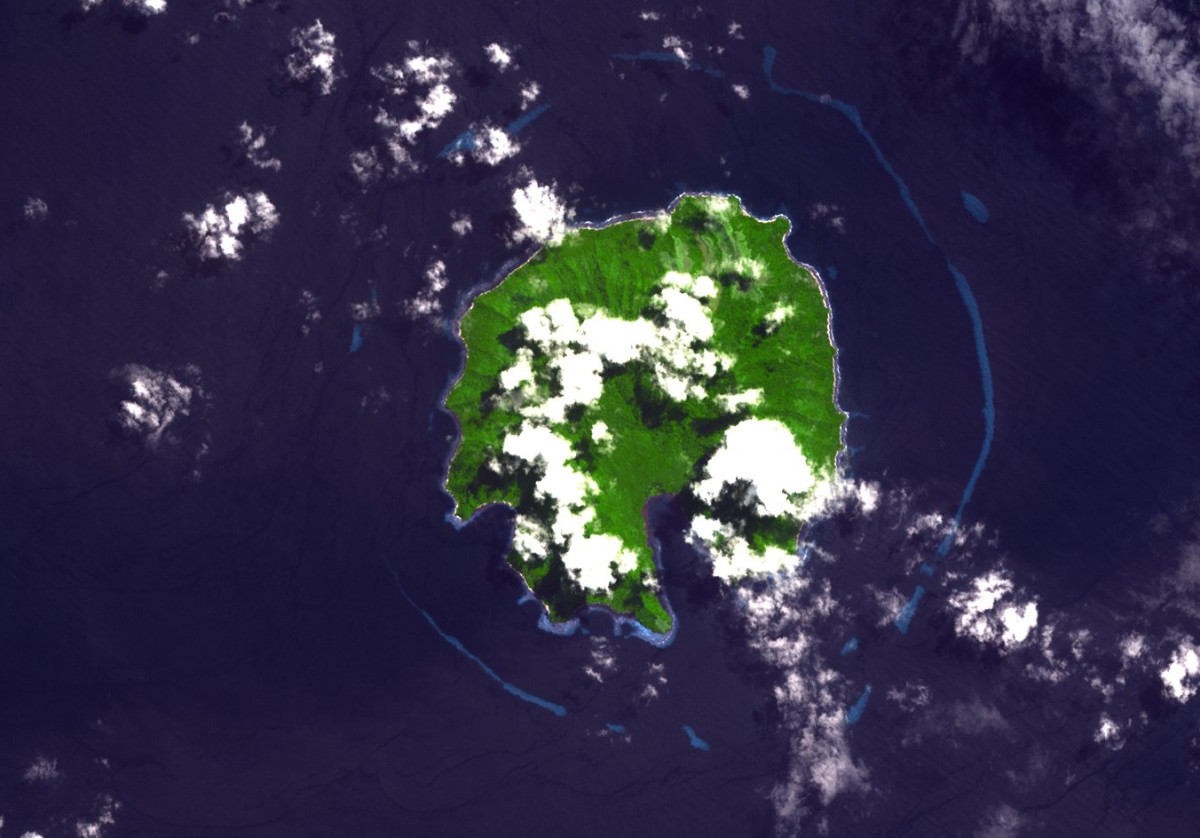
Bagabag island space view

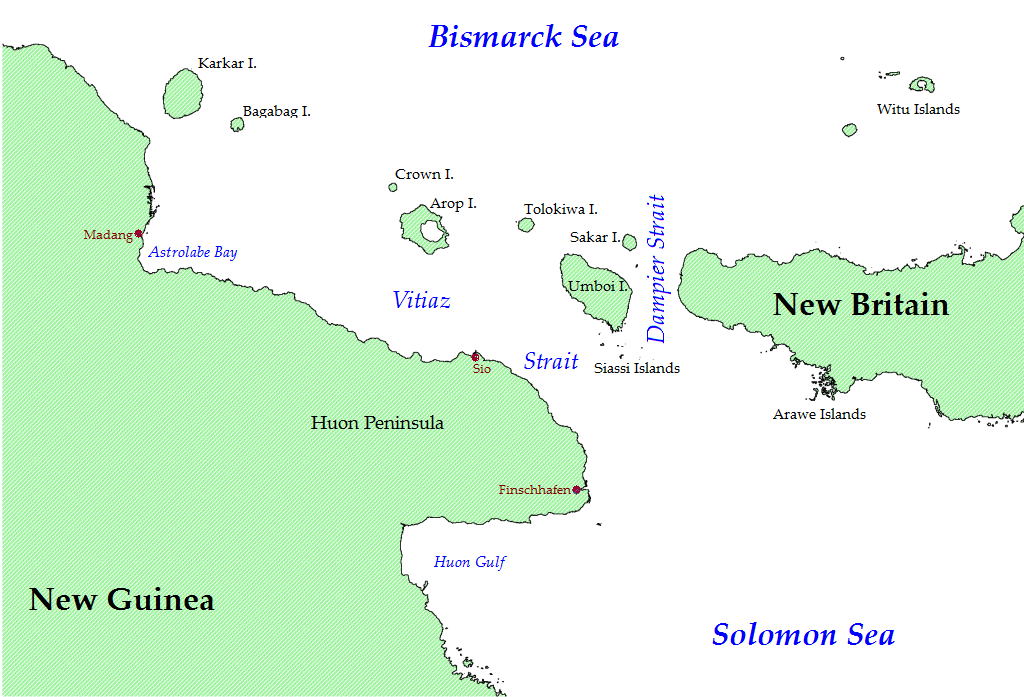
Bagabag island is in the upper left, next to Karkar Island

Bagabag is an island in the Madang Province of Papua New Guinea (PNG), which has a dormant volcano. It is part of the Karkar Rural LLG local government area of PNG.

== Geography and geology ==
Bagabag is 43 km (27 mi) east-north-east from Cape Croilles on the northern coast of the Papua New Guinea mainland, and is the closest island to Karkar Island which is 18 km (11 mi) to the north-west. The island is approximately circular in shape, with a diameter of about 7 km (4 mi). It has an area of 37 km^{2} (14 sq mi). The prominent feature of the coast is Christmas Bay, which cuts into the south-eastern side of the island. Volcanic in origin, terrain on Bagabaga consists of steep, thickly vegetated slopes that rise to over 600 m (2,000 ft) above sea level. Much of the northern, eastern and southern coasts are fringed by a barrier-type reef some 2 km (1.2 mi) offshore; the reef is narrow, and mostly submerged.

== Economy ==
People from Karkar visit Bagabag by canoe. The island is rich in betel-nut, local pigs and garden food. The island supports four villages with a total population of about 3,000. There is limited income from tourists, notably experienced divers, sailors, and game fisherman.

== History ==
The first recorded sighting by Europeans of Karkar Island was by the Spanish navigator Iñigo Órtiz de Retes on 10 August 1545 when on board of the carrack San Juan tried to return from Tidore to New Spain. The island has several good harbours that were used by the Japanese Navy during World War II to hide barges and small ships. Several aircraft crashed or ditched in the sea around the island.
