= Bargam language =

Papuan language of Papua New Guinea

Bargam
- Mugil
- Native to: Papua New Guinea
- Region: Madang Province
- Native speakers: 4,000 (2006)
- Language family: Trans–New Guinea: Madang; Bargam

Language codes
- ISO 639-3: mlp
- Glottolog: barg1252

Bargam, or Mugil, is a Papuan language of Sumgilbar Rural LLG, Madang Province, Papua New Guinea, spoken mainly by adults. It is divergent within the Madang language family.

The alphabet includes the letter Q with hook tail, Ɋ ɋ.

== Phonology ==
Consonants
	Labial	Alveolar	Velar	Glottal
Plosive	p b	t d	k g	ʔ ⟨ɋ⟩
Fricative	f	s z		h
Nasal	m	n	ŋ ⟨ng⟩	
Approximant	w	r l	j ⟨y⟩	

Vowels
	Front	Central	Back
High	i		u
Mid	e		o
Low		a	

Stress is usually found on the last syllable if it is closed, and on the penultimate syllable if the last syllable is open.
