= Karkar Rural LLG =

Local-level government in Papua New Guinea

- Location within Papua New Guinea
- Coordinates: 4.551137°S 145.940993°E
- Country: Papua New Guinea
- Province: Madang Province
- District: Sumkar District

Area
  - Total: 434.9 km^{2} (167.9 sq mi)

Population (2021 Estimate)
  - Total: 67,991
  - Density: 156.3/km^{2} (404.9/sq mi)
- Time zone: UTC+10 (AEST)

Karkar Rural LLG is a local-level government (LLG) of Madang Province, Papua New Guinea.

== Wards ==
- 01. Yau/Badilu
- 02. Matiu
- 03. Tarak
- 04. Kaviak
- 05. Kinim Station
- 06. Narer
- 07. Urugen
- 08. Bangme/Langlang
- 09. Gial
- 10. Tugutugu
- 11. Dimer
- 12. Kaul 1
- 13. Kaul 3
- 14. Mapor
- 15. Muluk
- 16. Kubam
- 17. Katom
- 18. Pain
- 19. Komoria
- 20. Dangsai
- 21. Biu
- 22. Did
- 23. Boroman
- 24. Kurum
- 25. Liloi
- 26. Marup
- 27. Kevasop
- 28. Mangar
- 29. Bafor
- 30. Kuduk
- 31. Bujon/Kurumtaur
- 32. Marangis/Mom
- 33. Keng/Mater
