= Manep language =

Papuan language

Manep
- Malas
- Simbukanam
- Native to: Papua New Guinea
- Region: Sumgilbar Rural LLG, Madang Province
- Native speakers: 650 (2003)
- Language family: Trans–New Guinea?: Madang; Croisilles; Isumrud; Dimir–Malas; Manep

Language codes
- ISO 639-3: mkr
- Glottolog: mala1495

Manep (Malas, Simbukanam) is a Papuan language of Sumgilbar Rural LLG, Madang Province, Papua New Guinea.

There are two dialects named after the villages in which they are spoken:

- Malas dialect, spoken in Malas village (4.688875°S 145.606541°E)
- Simbukanam dialect, spoken in Simbukanam village

The Malas and Simbukanam dialects differ slightly from each other.
