= John Z'graggen =

Swiss priest and linguist (1932–2013)

- Z'graggen, c. 2011
- Born: Hans Anton Z'graggen; 24 June 1932; Schattdorf, Switzerland
- Died: 20 May 2013 (aged 80); Menzingen, Switzerland

Academic background
- Education: St. Gabriel College at Mödling (Diploma in Ethnology, 1961)
- Alma mater: Australian National University
- Thesis: Classificatory and typological studies in the languages of Madang District (1969)

Academic work
- Discipline: Linguistics; Anthropology
- Sub-discipline: Papuan and Oceanic linguistics
- Institutions: Divine Word Institute

John Z'graggen (born Hans Anton Z'graggen; 24 June 1932 – 20 May 2013) was a Swiss Catholic priest, linguist, and anthropologist known for his extensive work on Papuan and Oceanic languages, especially the Madang languages. He has also documented languages in Sepik, Manus, and Gulf Provinces.

== Biography ==
Z'graggen attended St. Gabriel College at Mödling, where he graduated with a Diploma in Ethnology in 1961. He moved to Madang in 1963, where he then began documenting the local Madang languages. In 1965 or 1966, he enrolled at the Australian National University, where he completed the doctoral thesis Classificatory and typological studies in the languages of Madang District in 1969. The dissertation was published in 1971 with additional field data.

In 1981, he joined the newly founded Divine Word Institute (DWI; later renamed as the Divine Word University). He founded and directed the DWI Research Centre in 1984. Z'graggen continued to do research on Madang anthropology and linguistics until he was assigned to return to Switzerland in 1991.

Many of Z'graggen's tape recordings and field notes are kept at the Basel Museum of Cultures, as well as at the Divine Word University in Madang.

== Books ==
=== Linguistics ===
Z'graggen collected numerous word lists of Madang languages, many of which have been published as monographs by Pacific Linguistics:

- 1975. The languages of the Madang District, Papua New Guinea. Canberra: Pacific Linguistics. doi:10.15144/PL-B41
- 1980. A comparative word list of the Rai Coast languages, Madang Province, Papua New Guinea. Canberra: Pacific Linguistics. doi:10.15144/PL-D30
- 1980. A comparative word list of the Northern Adelbert Range languages, Madang Province, Papua New Guinea. Canberra: Pacific Linguistics. doi:10.15144/PL-D31
- 1980. A comparative word list of the Mabuso languages, Madang Province, Papua New Guinea. Canberra: Pacific Linguistics. doi:10.15144/PL-D32
- 1980. A comparative word list of the Southern Adelbert Range languages, Madang Province, Papua New Guinea. Canberra: Pacific Linguistics. doi:10.15144/PL-D33

Selected book chapters:

- 1975. The Madang-Adelbert Range sub-phylum. In New Guinea area languages and language study, vol. 1: Papuan languages and the New Guinea linguistic scene, ed. by S. A. Wurm, 569–612. Canberra: Pacific Linguistics. doi:10.15144/PL-C38.569
- 1975. (with Donald C. Laycock) The Sepik-Ramu Phylum. In New Guinea area languages and language study, vol. 1: Papuan languages and the New Guinea linguistic scene, ed. by S. A. Wurm, 731–763. Canberra: Pacific Linguistics. doi:10.15144/PL-C38.731

=== Ethnography ===
Z'graggen has written prolifically on the mythology and cosmology of the Madang peoples. Some of his books on Madang mythology are:

- 1992. And thus became man and world. Pentland Press.
- 1995. Creation through death and deception. Pentland Press.
- 1996. And thus became God. Pentland Press.
- 2011. The Lady Daria and Mister Kamadonga: A legend of Papua New Guinea. Crawford House Australia.
