= Clemens Voorhoeve =

Dutch linguist (born 1930)

- Born: Clemens Lambertus Voorhoeve; 1930 (age 95–96)
- Occupation: Linguist

Academic background
- Education: Leiden University

Academic work
- Main interests: Papuan linguistics

Clemens Lambertus Voorhoeve (born 1930; also known as "Bert" Voorhoeve) is a Dutch linguist who specializes in Papuan languages.

== Education ==
He completed his higher education in the Netherlands. He obtained his PhD in linguistics at Leiden University. Prior to obtaining his doctorate, he conducted fieldwork in among the Asmat people of Papua.

== Career ==
In 1965, he was employed as a researcher at the Australian National University.

He conducted extensive linguistic research in western and southern Papua New Guinea, as well as in Western New Guinea. He has also contributed significantly to the classifications of Papuan languages.

Voorhoeve retired in 1988.

== Selected publications ==
- Voorhoeve, C.L. "Miscellaneous Notes on Languages in West Irian, New Guinea". In Dutton, T., Voorhoeve, C. and Wurm, S.A. editors, Papers in New Guinea Linguistics No. 14. A-28:47-114. Pacific Linguistics, The Australian National University, 1971. doi:10.15144/PL-A28.47
- Voorhoeve, C.L. Languages of Irian Jaya: Checklist. Preliminary classification, language maps, wordlists. B-31, iv + 133 pages. Pacific Linguistics, The Australian National University, 1975. doi:10.15144/PL-B31
- Voorhoeve, C.L. "The Languages of the Lake Murray Area". In Voorhoeve, C., McElhanon, K., Blowers, B. and Blowers, R. editors, Papers in New Guinea Linguistics No. 12. A-25:1-18. Pacific Linguistics, The Australian National University, 1970. doi:10.15144/PL-A25.1
- Voorhoeve, C.L. The Asmat languages of Irian Jaya. B-64, x + 187 pages. Pacific Linguistics, The Australian National University, 1980. doi:10.15144/PL-B64
- Voorhoeve, C.L. editor. The Makian languages and their neighbours. D-46, viii + 156 pages. Pacific Linguistics, The Australian National University, 1982. doi:10.15144/PL-D46
- McElhanon, K.A. and Voorhoeve, C.L. The Trans-New Guinea Phylum: Explorations in deep-level genetic relationships. B-16, vi + 112 pages. Pacific Linguistics, The Australian National University, 1970. doi:10.15144/PL-B16
