= Gavak language =

Papuan language of Papua New Guinea

Gavak
- Dimir, Bosiken
- Native to: Papua New Guinea
- Region: Madang Province
- Native speakers: 3,800 (2003)
- Language family: Trans–New Guinea?: Madang; Croisilles; Isumrud; Dimir–Malas; Gavak

Language codes
- ISO 639-3: dmc
- Glottolog: dimi1244

Gavak, also known as Bosiken (Boskien) and Dimir, is a Papuan language of Madang Province, Papua New Guinea. It is spoken in the Dimir River area.

== Phonology ==
=== Consonants ===
		Labial	Alveolar	Palatal	Velar
Nasal		m	n		ŋ
Plosive	voiceless	p	t		k
Plosive	voiced	b	d		ɡ
Fricative			s		
Trill			r		
Approximant		w	l	j	

=== Vowels ===
	Front	Back
High	i	u
Mid	e	o
Low		a
