= Paso Robles Wine Services =

Paso RoblesWine Services
- Location: Paso Robles, USA
- Appellation: Paso Robles
- Founded: 2002
- First vintage: 2002
- Key people: David Sartain (Branch Manager), Paul Ayers(winemaker), Steve Miller (Owner), Nicholas Miller (Owner)
- Known for: Anglim, Black Hand Cellars, Vina Robles, Mid Life Crisis
- Varietals: Zinfandel, Syrah, Chardonnay, Merlot, Grenache, Cabernet Sauvignon
- Tasting: not open to public
- Website: http://www.pasorobleswineservices.com

Paso Robles Wine Services is a multi-winery processing and warehouse facility located in Paso Robles, California.

== History ==
Front of Paso Robles Wine Services

Founded in the fall of 2002, the Paso Robles Wine Service was started to answer a need for a facility such as the Central Coast Wine Services for winery operations in the Paso Robles area. In many ways, the Paso Robles operation duplicates the Central Coast operation, though initially it will serve AP customers, small wineries, and warehousing requirements of any size customer.

Started in a leased building, the PRWS rapidly expanded into two rented buildings and outgrew those. Starting with crush in 2006, the PRWS moved to its own facility specifically designed for winery operations. This building was constructed on a parcel of land near the Paso Robles Airport, and has expanded to approximately 156,000 square feet (14,500 m^{2}).

Barrels of Paso Robles Wine Services

Since its inception, the PRWS has greatly expanded its business to include well over 30 Alternating Proprietors with a waiting list, as well as some custom processed wines for vineyards. The strength and quality of the winemaking continues to grow under the leadership of head winemaker Paul Ayers and manager David Sartain.

== Facility ==
View of Paso Robles Wine Services

- Area of facility: 156,000 sq. ft (14770 m^{2})

Stainless Steel Storage: 47,750 gallons (218 kilolitres) Case Good Storage: 200,000 cases Barrel storage: 5,000+ barrels Press capacity: 100 tons per day Certified scale: 70-foot (21 m) truck scale and 5,000 lbs. "bin" scale (New Facility) AP Facilities: Approximately 40 individual wineries

View of Paso Robles Wine Services Interior

35.674038°N 120.6441083°W
