= Melanesian mythology =

Dancers representing ghosts and spirits wear masks made of a tapa-covered light bamboo frame with an ankle-length fringe. Elema tribe, Gulf of Papua, Papua New Guinea (Peabody Museum, Cambridge, MA.)

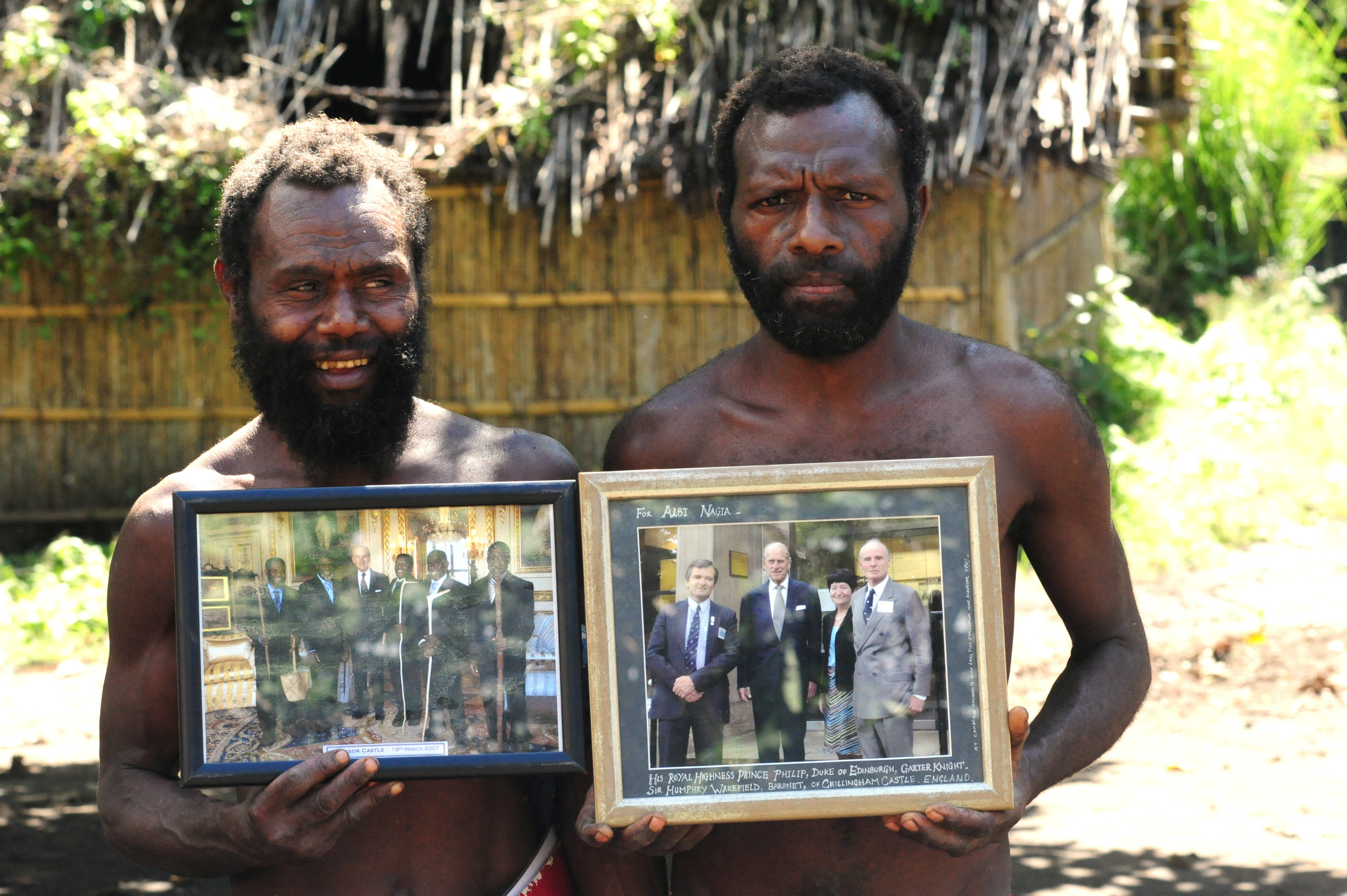
Some people in Tanna (Vanuatu) consider Prince Philip to be divine.

Melanesian mythology refers to the folklore, myths, and religions of Melanesia, a region in Southwest Oceania that encompasses the archipelagos of New Guinea (including Indonesian New Guinea and Papua New Guinea), the Torres Strait Islands, Solomon Islands, Vanuatu, New Caledonia and Fiji. The various mythologies consist primarily of the traditions of oral literature in the different populations of Melanesia. More recent aspects include the cargo cults born in the 20th century during the Pacific War.

== The Mythology of All Races (1916) ==
In 1916 Roland Burrage Dixon wrote an early account of Melanesian mythology in The Mythology of All Races. Dixon's compilation reflects beliefs by some Western observers of the time in the existence of a mythology at the scale of Melanesia as a whole. It was then accepted practice to blend together mythological traditions from different regions of the South Pacific as if they were examples of a single "Melanesian" culture. Modern scholars such as Hilary Howes, Tristen Jones and Matthew Spriggs, critique this approach as over-simplification, preferring to present each local tradition separately and suggest possible links more carefully.

=== Dixon's proposed division of the area's populations ===
According to Dixon, Melanesia falls into two geographic divisions: New Guinea with its adjacent smaller islands forming one; and the long series of islands lying to the north and east of it, from the Admiralty group to New Caledonia and Fiji, constituting the other.

From an anthropological point of view, the population of the Melanesian area is composed of a number of different historical populations (what Dixon called "racial types"). (Note: Note the judgmental phrasing typical of Dixon's colonial times, sometimes dismissive or even racist.) He recognized "at least three groups":

1. One group, called by Dixon "Negrito or Negrito-like tribes", were supposedly living mostly in the interior of New Guinea and a few islands of Island Melanesia (the "Eastern Archipelago" in his terms) (Note: It is unclear which population of New Guinea Dixon was referring to using that description "Negrito-like".)
2. A second group he identified as Papuan, which he had little information about.
3. A third group, corresponding to Austronesian-speaking populations of Melanesia. (Note: Dixon described these Austronesian populations, which he called "Melanesians", in these terms: a group “which occupies much of south-eastern New Guinea, together with part of its northern and north-western coasts, and forms the majority of the inhabitants of the islands reaching from the Admiralty Islands to Fiji”.)

Contrary to modern usage, Dixon used the term Melanesian only to refer to his third group, namely the non-Papuan populations of Melanesia. (Note: Dixon evidently uses the term "Melanesian" to refer exclusively to Austronesian people: this is at odds with the generally accepted definition of "Melanesia", which commonly includes both Austronesian and Papuan populations.)

=== Main characteristics of Dixon's typology ===
According to Dixon, the material on the mythology of Melanesia, though incomplete and fragmentary, "appears rather clearly to prove" the existence of two distinct strata, one of which he called "Papuan", the other "Melanesian" [sic]. Although the author does not mention languages, his proposed dichotomy, based on oral literature, evidently matches the contrast made by linguists, between speakers of Papuan languages and speakers of Austronesian (Oceanic) languages.

Dixon's "Papuan" layer was best represented, in his view, among the Kai tribes of northern Papua New Guinea, as well as by the Baining and Sulka of northern New Britain.

His so-called "Melanesian" stratum, on the other hand, was mostly found in Remote Oceania (which he named "eastern Melanesia"), but also throughout parts of New Guinea, among the coast tribes of northern New Britain, and in the Admiralty Islands.

- According to Dixon, the "Papuan" type of mythology was characterized by a relative absence of cosmogonic myths, by the prominence of ghosts, and by "a general simplicity and naivete" [sic]. This category also appears to remain in local populations, rather than being distributed more widely.
- The "Melanesian" mythology, on the other hand, has more myths relating to cosmogony, as well as cannibalistic tales, and often includes a rudimentary dualistic character (revealed in many stories of the wise and foolish hero brothers).

As Dixon further examined his "Melanesian" type, he found that it lacked unity. He suggested the following grouping:

1. Myths that were generally from "Melanesia";
2. Myths strictly in New Guinea and the immediate vicinity.
3. Myths from Fiji, Central Vanuatu, or the Banks and Santa Cruz Islands.

Including the whole of the Oceanic area, Dixon noted that the "Papuan" type showed little in common with any of the other Pacific regions, while his so-called "Melanesian" type showed similarities with Indonesia, Micronesia, and Polynesia; and even Australia. The "Melanesian" type of myths (which held similarities to the other areas) can be divided into four groups:

1. Those who only share similarities with Indonesia, which are typically represented more in the northern coast of New Guinea;
2. Those sharing similarities with Polynesia, which are more prominent in the southern coast of New Guinea and seemingly comprising myths from Melanesia as well;
3. Those sharing similarities with both Indonesia and Polynesia, which are most common in Remote Oceania, the eastern archipelago of Melanesia, and may have been brought and preserved by Polynesian ancestors from their Indonesian homes; or
4. Only with Micronesia, which are equally represented in New Guinea and the eastern archipelago.

=== Myths of origins and the deluge ===
According to Dixon's classification, the mythology of his "Melanesian" area (i.e. the area populated by Oceanic-speaking populations) is characterized by the almost total lack of myths relating to the origin of the world. With one or two exceptions, the Earth seems to be regarded as having always existed in more or less the same form as today.

In the Admiralty Islands, a portion of the population believed that once there was nothing but a widespread sea. One myth states that a great serpent commanded a reef to rise to form the first area of dry land. Another origin myth entails a man and a woman floating in the sea on a piece of driftwood until the waters retreated, upon which they began to reside on dry land. In New Britain, among the coastal tribes of the Gazelle Peninsula, the two culture hero brothers, To-Kabinana and To-Karvuvu fished dry land from the bottom of the sea. The same story in slightly greater detail is found also in the southern New Hebrides.

The concept of a primeval sea is found widely in central Polynesia, Micronesia, and Indonesia, but appears only in the northern parts of Melanesia, where contact with non-Melanesian peoples would theoretically be expected. A much closer affiliation with Polynesia is shown in another class of origin-myths.

While Dixon did not focus on the beginning of the world in his "Melanesian" area, he found considerable and widely varying material on the creation of mankind. Three types of myths may be recognized: one, in which mankind is directly created by some deity or pre-existing being; second, in which man comes into being spontaneously or magically; third, where mankind descends to earth from the sky-land.

=== Creation of mankind ===
In the Admiralty Islands, one myth exists about a lonely man who longed for a wife and so commanded a carved wooden figure of a woman to come to life.

In the Banks Islands, the deity Qat is described as the first to make humans, cutting wood out of the dracaena tree and forming it into six figures, three men and three women. After hiding them away for three days, he brought them to life and divided them into three married pairs. Marawa, an envious man, saw what Qat had made and took another kind of wood and gave them life. When he saw them move, he dug a pit and covered the bottom with coconut fronds, burying his men and women in it for seven days. After he dug them up again, he found them lifeless, this being regarded as the origin of death among men. According to another version from the same area, while the first man was made of red clay by Qat, he created the first woman of rods and rings of twigs covered with the spathes of sago palms, which are used to make the tall hats used in sacred dances.

A tale of the creation of man from earth is told in the New Hebrides. It involves a godlike figure, Takaro, who made ten male figures from mud, and breathed life into them. He then threw a fruit at one of them, which transformed the man into a woman.

Another myth from New Britain describes a being drawing two male figures upon the ground, sprinkling the drawings with his own blood, and covering them over with leaves, the result being that they came to life as two men, To-Kabinana and To-Karvuvu. To-Kabinana then climbed a coconut-tree, and picking two unripe coconuts, threw them to the ground, where they burst and changed into two women, whom he took as his wives. Then To-Karvuvu tried to do the same, except that he threw the nuts to the ground point downward, and the women that arose from them had flat ugly noses.

=== Origin of mankind from other sources ===
Another major myth of the creation of humankind in Melanesian mythology is that humans originated from birds.

In the Admiralty Islands, a myth describes a dove bearing two young, one of which was a bird and one a man, who became the ancestor of the human race. In another version of the myth, a tortoise laid ten eggs, from which hatched eight tortoises, one man, and one woman. The men and women married, becoming the ancestors of both light-skinned and dark-skinned people. In Fiji, it is said that a bird laid two eggs which were hatched by Ndengei, a serpent, a boy coming from one and a girl from the other. A variant of this is found in Torres Straits where, according to the Eastern Islanders, a maggot developed from a bird egg, which then transformed into a man.

Myths of the origin of men or of deities from a clot of blood are found in Melanesia among other parts of Oceania. A myth from the Admiralty Islands places the origin of men as having hatched from eggs that arose from the spilled blood of a woman named Hi-asa. In the neighboring island of New Britain, one account gives a similar origin for the two brothers To-Rabinana and To-Karvuvu: An old woman was wading in the sea searching for shellfish; her arms pained her, and so, taking two sharp strips of pandanus, she scratched and cut first one arm and then the other. The two bloodied strips of pandanus later began to swell, and when she was about to set fire to it to destroy them, two boys had grown from her blood—from the blood of her right arm, To-Kabinana, and from her left arm, To-Karvuvu. At several regions in northern Papua New Guinea, Dixon seemed to find similar tales of children originating from clots of blood.

An origin of the human race from plants is unique to the Solomon Islands, where it is said that two knots began to sprout on a stalk of sugar-cane, from which came a man and a woman. In New Britain, however, a myth goes that the first woman came from a sugar cane planted by two men. After the sugar cane burst, the men seized and mated with her. In some versions, the woman then became the wife of one of the men, and all mankind are descended from the pair. An origin of the first woman from a tree and of the first man from the ground is given by the Papuan tribes of Elema in southern Papua New Guinea; in the New Hebrides, the first female being is said to have been transformed from a cowrie-shell.

An origin of man from stone is told by the Baining of New Britain: At first the only beings in the world were the Sun and the Moon, but they united, and from their union were born stones and birds, the former subsequently turning into men, the latter into women. The origin of Qat himself is ascribed in the Banks group to a stone, which burst and gave birth to the deity.

=== Origin of the sea ===
Although Dixon's "Melanesia" lacks myths of the origin of the world, a tale recounting the source of the sea is quite widely spread. As told by the Baining in New Britain, the story runs as follows:

In the beginning the sea was only a tiny water-hole from which an old woman got the saltwater to flavor her food, which she kept concealed under a cover of tapa cloth. One day, her sons tore open the cover; the farther they tore, the larger became the water-hole. Terrified by this, they ran away, each carrying a corner of the cloth; which caused the water to spread until it became the sea. In response, the old woman hastily planted some twigs along the edge of the shore, thereby preventing the ocean from destroying all things.

=== Origin of the sun and moon ===
Various myths describe the origin of the sun and moon. In the Admiralty Islands, it is said that when the sea had dried, the first two beings made two mushrooms. The man threw one into the sky, creating the moon; the woman tossed the other upward and formed the sun.

According to a myth from southern Papua New Guinea, a man uncovered the moon as a small bright object buried in the ground. After he had taken it out, it grew and rose high into the sky. A similar tale from northern Papua New Guinea recounts how the moon was originally kept hidden in a jar by an old woman. Some boys discovered it, and secretly opened the jar, whereupon the moon flew out and rose into the sky.

The people of Woodlark Island have a tale in which the origin of the sun and moon is connected with the origin of fire: In the beginning an old woman was the sole owner of fire, and she alone could eat cooked food, while other people only had raw food. The woman refused to share the fire, so her son stole some of the flame and gave it to the rest of mankind. In anger at his action, the old woman seized what was left of her fire, divided it into two parts, and threw them into the sky, the larger portion becoming the sun, and the smaller the moon.

In all of these myths the sun and moon seem to be regarded as inanimate objects. Another group of tales, however, considers them to be living beings. One such version is given by one of the tribes of the Massim district of southern Papua New Guinea: A woman was walking at an ocean reef and playing with a fish, when the fish rubbed against her leg, which began to swell and become painful. The woman cut the swelling spot, when out popped an infant boy named Dudugera, who was later seized by the fish. Before he left, Dudugera warned his mother and relatives to take refuge under a great rock, for soon, he said, he would climb into a pandanus-tree and go into the sky as the sun and destroy everything with his heat. As he foretold, almost everything was destroyed except for his mother and her relatives who had taken his advice. To prevent their total annihilation, the mother took a lime-calabash and cast the lime into his face as he came up, causing the sun to shut his eyes and decrease the amount of heat.

A main characteristic of Melanesian origin mythology is the concept that the day existed first without night, until the night was discovered or brought to humankind. In the Banks Islands, the deity Qat did not create the night. He heard that in the country of Vava (the Torres Islands) there was night, so he went there to meet i Qong ("Night"), and bought night from him. (Note: According to Dixon, other accounts say that Qat sailed to the edge of the sky to buy night from Night, who blackened his eyebrows, showed him sleep and taught him how to make the dawn.) Qat returned to his island of Vanua Lava with the night, a rooster, and a stone of obsidian. He then told his brothers to lie down and shut their eyes. They all lay down and quickly fell asleep, while the sky became dark. After a while, Qat took out the rooster, and had it sing to wake up his brothers. At the same time, he took his obsidian stone and slit the dark sky apart: this was the first morning.

=== Origin of fire ===
Myths of the origin of fire present a number of types. Dixon began with a form common in southern Papua New Guinea. According to a version told by the Motu, the ancestors of the present people had no fire, and ate their food raw until one day they saw smoke rising out at sea. A group of animals saw the smoke; a dog went to look for the origin, where he saw women cooking with fire. Seizing a blazing brand, he swam safely back with it to the mainland, where he gave it to all the people.

Some of the Massim tribes of south-eastern Papua New Guinea give a different origin: Before the discovery of fire, an old woman called Goga made uncooked food for many people. However, she could obtain fire from her own body and made cooked food only for herself. One day, a piece of boiled taro accidentally got in one man's food. Then, the people learned of the woman's fire, and the man stole the firebrand. As he ran away from the old woman, the brand burned his hand, and he dropped it in the dry grass, which caught fire to which spread to a nearby tree, causing a snake who lived in a hole in the tree to catch on fire. The old woman commanded a rain to fall to stop the fire, but the snake's tail remained dry and burning. The people retrieved the tail and set a pile of wood on fire.

A version from the Admiralty Islands is as follows: A woman and a snake married and gave birth to a son and a daughter. The snake took control of the children and sent his wife away. One day, the children, being hungry, were told to go and catch fish. They brought fish back to the snake, who told his son to crawl into his belly and take the fire from him to cook the food. The son did so, and brought back the fire to share with his sister and cook food with.

A different fire myth involving a snake originated from New Britain. Originally, the Sulka did not know fire, but one day a man named Emakong fell into a stream and found a house at the bottom, where many people lived, who had fire and the night and invited Emakong to stay for a time. When nighttime came, the people transformed into snakes. At night crickets sung, and in the morning the birds sung, neither of which Emakong's home had. When Emakong left, his hosts made him a package with night, fire, crickets, and birds, which he took home and shared with his people.

=== Origin of death ===
According to a version in Ambrym, an island in Vanuatu, good and malicious deities were discussing humanity after it had been made. The good deity proposed that men shed their skin to preserve their youthful demeanour forever. The evil deity disagreed, and proposed that men who grew too old be buried in the ground forever. Because it is said the one who has the last word prevails, death came into the world.

According to another form of myth told in the Banks Islands, in the beginning men did not die but could shed their skins to restore their youth. One day, after an old woman had shed their skin, her infant child refused to recognize her in her new and youthful form. To pacify the infant, who cried without ceasing, she returned and got her old skin, and put it on again. From that time men have ceased to cast their skins and have died when they grew old.

According to other tales, death was due to a mistake. In the Banks Islands, the myths also went that in the beginning men lived forever and shed their skins, but that the permanence of property in the same hands led to much trouble. Qat, therefore, summoned a man called Mate ("Death") and laid him on a board and killed him. He then killed a pig and divided Mate's property among his descendants, all of whom came and mourned Mate's death. Five days after, conch-shells were blown to drive away the ghost, Qat removed the covering, and Mate was gone, leaving only his bones. Meanwhile, Qat had sent Tagaro the Foolish to watch the way to Panoi, where the paths to the underworld and the upper regions divide, to see that Mate did not go below. Tagaro mistakenly sat before the way of the world above, leading Mate to descend into the underworld, which all humans have subsequently followed.

Still another explanation is that death was due to disobedience. The Baining in New Britain say that one day the sun called all things together and asked which wished to live forever. All came except man, which meant that man must die. Had man obeyed the sun, he would have been able to acquire immortality.

Another myth attributes the origin of death to ungratefulness. In the Admiralty group, one account states that a man who was fishing was then chased by an evil spirit. He fled into the forest and climbed into a tree to hide. The tree closed itself when the spirit came and re-opened when it left, thereafter asking the man for two white pigs for its help. The man returned to his village. When he returned, he brought one white pig and a black pig that he colored with white chalk. The tree then cursed all humans to die.

=== Deluge and flood ===
Of deluge-myths from the Melanesian area, only a few have been reported which do not bear the marks of missionary influence, such as references to the great flood in Christianity.

=== Geographical flow ===
Dixon believes that from the tales he collected, the origin-myths of Melanesia show clear evidence of composite origins. He believes that comparisons of Polynesian and Indonesian myths suggest that the myths of the origin of the sea, of mankind as originally having had the power to renew their youth by changing skins, and of the obtaining of fire from or with the aid of snakes, were primarily Papuan, for no traces of either appear in Indonesia, and only the former is found in a different form in Samoa, but nowhere else in Polynesia. Other themes, Dixon observes, such as the origin of human beings from eggs or from a clot of blood, are widely known in Indonesia and in western and south-western Polynesia, and suggest that myths immigrated through the strait that passes from Indonesia eastward into the Pacific.

== Cultural heroes ==
One of the most noteworthy features of Melanesian mythology is the prominence of tales relating either to two culture heroes, one of whom is wise and benevolent, while the other is foolish and malicious; or to a group of brothers, usually ten or twelve in number, two of whom, one wise and one foolish, are especially outstanding. A sort of dualism is developed which stands in contrast to Indonesian mythology, while showing points of contact with Polynesian and Micronesian ideas.

=== To-Kabinana and To-Karvuvu (New Britain) ===
To-Kabinana and To-Karvuvu were a pair of mythical brothers. Many of the evil or harmful things in the world, such as cannibalism, are attributed to the work of the foolish brother, To-Karvuvu. To-Kabinana, on the other hand, appears as actively benevolent, his well-intentioned deeds on behalf of mankind being frustrated by his brother. Tales of a similar type have been collected at one or two points on the shore of northern Papua New Guinea, but appear to be much less common than among the coast population of New Britain.

From southern Papua New Guinea, few tales of this sort seem to have been collected. By contrast, stories of wise and foolish brothers are very prevalent in the Solomons and Vanuatu; in the latter cases, tales of the second type (i.e. concerning a group of ten or twelve) are more common.

=== Qat (Banks islands) ===
In the Banks Islands, Qat is the principal deity in mythology. He had eleven brothers, all of whom are named Tagaro, one being Tagaro the Wise, and one Tagaro the Foolish. In the stories told in Mota, all the brothers conspired against Qat and to kill him. In Gaua, another island of the group, Qat has his antithesis in Marawa, a Spider, a personage who seems to become Qat's friend and guide.

=== Tagaro (Ambae) ===
In Vanuatu, Tagaro is conceived as the chief actor and is pitted against a twelfth brother, Suqe-matua. In Ambae (former Lepers Island in Vanuatu), Tagaro and Suqe-matua shared the work of creation, but whatever the latter did was wrong. They always disagreed, but the word of Tagaro prevailed.

== Themes ==
=== Ghosts ===
Typical of Melanesia are the many tales of ghosts. Dixon cited an example from the Kai, a Papuan tribe of northern Papua New Guinea.

=== Cannibals ===
A common theme in Melanesian tales is the risk for humans to be eaten alive by non-humans: either ghosts, spirits, or dangerous animals. Mentions of human cannibalism – where humans are eaten by other humans – are much rarer, but they exist in some stories.

=== Monsters ===
A common story plot in Melanesia is for villagers to be threatened by a grave danger (monster, giant animal, volcano...) and to leave en masse their island – except for one person, usually a pregnant woman, who is left there alone. The child born from that woman will become the hero to defeat the monster.

=== The myth of the swan maiden ===
The theme of the swan-maiden, which perhaps occurs in parts of Polynesia and widely in Indonesia, seems quite well developed in Vanuatu.

The character of the swan maiden (and her variants) is spread among the many traditions of Oceania and the Pacific Ocean, such as in Micronesia. In this region, the bird maiden may be replaced for a sea creature, such as a fish, a porpoise, a dolphin (in Yap and Kei Islands), or a whale (in Puluwat and Satawal).

=== Origin myths ===
Etiological myths are common in Melanesia (more so than in the rest of the Austronesian world), as well as in Australia: these are origin myths, that account for peculiar characteristics of the world we know – including animals, plants, societies, and so on.

== List of mythical beings ==
- Ulupoka, a godly figure from Fiji and Polynesia.
- Hana, the moon god of the Huli people in the Papua New Guinea
- Ni, the sun goddess of the Huli people in the Papua New Guinea
- Kahausibware, a creator goddess of the Mono-Alu people of the Solomon Islands
- Warohunugamwanehaora, a cultural hero of Makira (Solomon Islands)
- Adaro, a water spirit of Makira (Solomon Islands)
- Kakamora, a mythical population of elf-like creatures in the tradition of Makira and Guadalcanal (Solomon islands)
- Tamate, spirits of ancestors in northern Vanuatu
- Qat, a cultural hero of the Banks islands (north Vanuatu)
- Tagaro, a cultural hero of northern Vanuatu, whose name is related to the Polynesian deity Tangaroa
- Lisepsep, a mythical creature in the folklore of Vanuatu, notably Malekula
- Abaia, a huge, magical eel from the Fiji, Solomon, and Vanuatu Islands
- Kilibob and Manup, mythical brothers of northeastern Papua New Guinea
- Hainuwele, a dema deity that gave origin to the main vegetable crops from Seram Island in Indonesia
- Suanggi, a malevolent spirit in the folklore of many regions in Eastern Indonesia
- Gurabesi, a semi-historical cultural hero from Raja Ampat Islands and Biak Islands

== See also ==
- Papuan mythology
- Kuwae, a submarine volcano of central Vanuatu, whose eruption in 1452 had a major impact on the oral traditions of the Shepherd Islands (Vanuatu)
- Roi Mata, a historical figure of central Vanuatu, whose memory has survived in oral traditions of the Shepherd Islands (Vanuatu)
- Cargo cults

== Bibliography ==
- Codrington, Robert Henry (1881). "Religious beliefs and practices in Melanesia". The Journal of the Anthropological Institute of Great Britain and Ireland. 10: 261–316. doi:10.2307/2841527. JSTOR 2841527.
- Codrington, Robert Henry (1891). The Melanesians: Studies in Their Anthropology and Folk-lore. New York: Clarendon Press. ISBN 9780486202587.
- Denoon, Donald; Lacey, Roderic (1981). Oral tradition in Melanesia. Port Moresby, PNG: University of Papua New Guinea. hdl:1885/126307.
- Dixon, Roland (1916). "Melanesia". The Mythology of All Races. Vol. IX: Oceanic. Boston: Marshall Jones. pp. 101–150.
- Fox, C. E.; Drew, F. H. (1915–1917). "Beliefs and Tales of San Cristoval". The Journal of the Royal Anthropological Institute of Great Britain and Ireland. 45: 187–228. doi:10.2307/2843476. JSTOR 2843476.
- François, Alexandre (2013), "Shadows of bygone lives: The histories of spiritual words in northern Vanuatu", in Mailhammer, Robert (ed.), Lexical and structural etymology: Beyond word histories, Studies in Language Change, vol. 11, Berlin: DeGruyter Mouton, pp. 185–244, ISBN 978-1-61451-058-1
- Knappert, Jan (1992). Pacific mythology: An encyclopedia of myth and legend. Hammersmith, London: Aquarian/Thorsons. ISBN 978-1-85538-133-9.
- Vienne, Bernard (1984). Gens de Motlav - Idéologie et pratique sociale en Mélanésie. Société des Océanistes. Paris: ORSTOM. ISBN 9782854300642..
