= Bogia District =

- Location within Papua New Guinea
- Coordinates: 4.2770°S 144.9680°E
- Country: Papua New Guinea
- Province: Madang Province
- Capital: Bogia
- LLGs: List: Almami Rural LLG; Iabu Rural LLG; Yawar Rural LLG

Area
  - Total: 3,722 km^{2} (1,437 sq mi)

Population (2024 Census)
  - Total: 106,780
  - Density: 28.69/km^{2} (74.30/sq mi)
- Time zone: UTC+10 (AEST)

Bogia District is a district in the north-west of Madang Province in Papua New Guinea. It is one of the six administrative districts that make up the province.

Almami Rural LLG is one of the three local-level government council areas of Bogia district in Madang Province. It comprises over thirty council ward areas.
