= Kumil River =

River in Papua New Guinea

Kumil River Barbir River
- Location within Papua New Guinea

Location
- Country: Papua New Guinea
- Region: Madang Province

Physical characteristics
- Source
  - location: Papua New Guinea
- Mouth
  - coordinates: 4°31′51″S 145°28′53″E

The Kumil River is a river in northern Papua New Guinea.

== See also ==
- List of rivers of Papua New Guinea
- Kumil River languages
