= Miani language =

Madang language spoken in Papua New Guinea

Miani
- Tani
- Native to: Papua New Guinea
- Region: Madang Province
- Ethnicity: Rarin and neighboring villages of Bedup, Kaukombar, Bobom, Viab, Suraten, Tamokot and Simbine
- Native speakers: (3,000 South cited 2003, 1,500 North cited 1987)
- Language family: Trans–New Guinea?: Madang; Croisilles; Northwest Adelbert Range; Kaukombar; Miani

Language codes
- ISO 639-3: Either: pla – Miani (North) includes Rarin, Simbine, Tamokot, Bedup and Kaukombar tnh – Maiani (South) includes Viab, Bobom, Waba, Aleswav, Giniwarav and many more in the interlands
- Glottolog: mian1254 Miani (North) maia1253 Maiani (South)

Miani, formerly Tani after a village name, is a Papuan language complex of Madang Province, Papua New Guinea. The northern and southern varieties, Miani and Maiani, are dialects in terms of vocabulary or pronunciation.
