= Takia language =

Austronesian language spoken in Papua New Guinea

Takia
- Native to: Papua New Guinea
- Region: Madang Province
- Native speakers: (undated figure of 40,000)
- Language family: Austronesian: Malayo-Polynesian; Oceanic; Western Oceanic; North New Guinea ?; Ngero–Vitiaz; Bel; Nuclear Bel; Northern; Takia

Language codes
- ISO 639-3: tbc
- Glottolog: taki1248

Takia is an Austronesian language spoken on Karkar Island, Bagabag Island, and coastal villages Megiar and Serang, Madang Province, Papua New Guinea. It has been syntactically restructured by Waskia, a Papuan language spoken on the island.

Children are discouraged from using Takia, and it is being supplanted by Tok Pisin and English.

== Phonology ==
Consonant sounds
	Labial	Alveolar	Velar
Plosive	p b	t d	k g
Nasal	m	n	ŋ
Fricative	f	s	
Rhotic		r	
Lateral		l	
Glide	w		j

Voiced stops can be optionally prenasalised word initially as [ᵐb, ⁿd, ᵑɡ] in some dialects.

Vowel sounds
	Front	Central	Back
High	i		u
Mid	e		o
Low		a	

/a/ is heard as [æ] before a consonant preceding /i/. The sequence /ae/ is pronounced word-initially and word-medially as [æː].
