= Malcolm Ross (linguist) =

Australian linguist

Malcolm Ross FAHA
- Born: Malcolm David Ross; May 3, 1942 (age 84); London, United Kingdom
- Occupation: Linguist

Academic background
- Education: Australian National University
- Academic advisors: Stephen Wurm, Bert Voorhoeve, Darrell Tryon

Academic work
- Institutions: Australian National University
- Main interests: Papuan languages, Austronesian languages

Malcolm David Ross FAHA (born 3 May 1942) is an Australian linguist. He is emeritus professor of linguistics at the Australian National University (ANU).

Ross is best known among linguists for his work on Austronesian and Papuan languages, historical linguistics, and language contact (especially metatypy). He was elected as a Fellow of the Australian Academy of the Humanities in 1996.

== Career ==
Ross served as the Principal of Goroka Teachers College in Papua New Guinea from 1980 to 1982, during which time he reports becoming interested in local languages, and began to collect data on them. In 1986, he received his PhD from the ANU under the supervision of Stephen Wurm, Bert Voorhoeve and Darrell Tryon. His dissertation was on the genealogy of the Oceanic languages of western Melanesia, and contained an early reconstruction of Proto Oceanic.

Malcolm Ross introduced the concept of a linkage, a group of languages that evolves via dialect differentiation rather than by tree-like splits.

Together with Andrew Pawley and Meredith Osmond, Ross has contributed to the Proto-Oceanic Lexicon Project, which has produced several volumes of reconstructed Proto-Oceanic vocabulary in various semantic domains.

Ross has published on Formosan languages, Papuan languages and the reconstruction of Proto-Austronesian phonology and syntax.
