= Adelbert Range =

Mountain range in Papua New Guinea

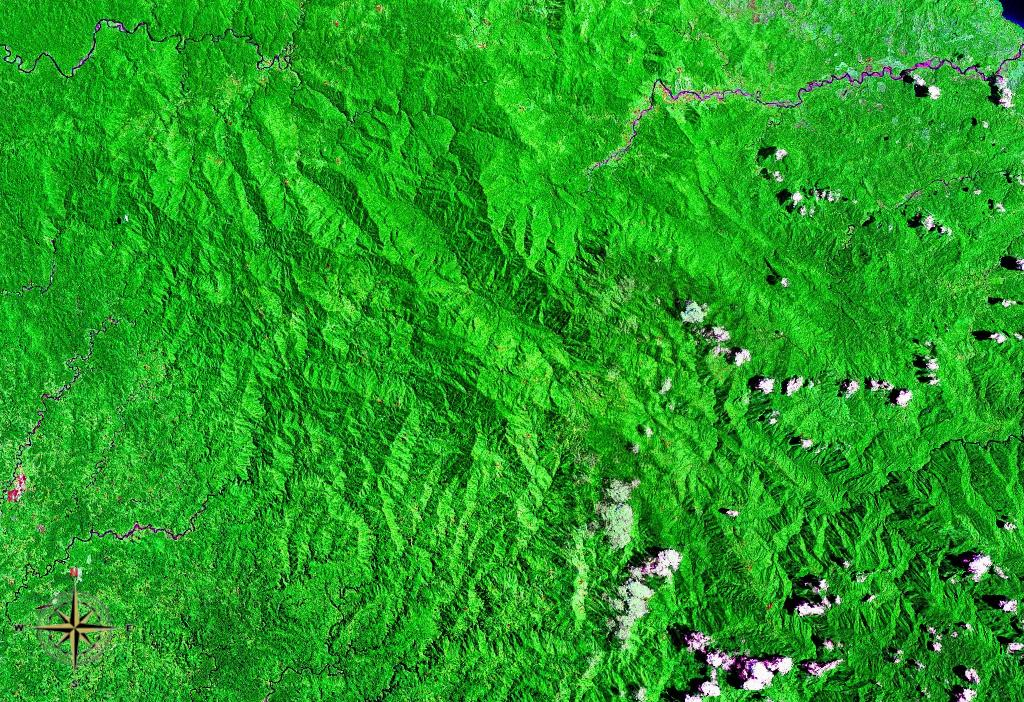
- Adelbert Range seen from space (false color)

Highest point
- Peak: Unnamed high point
- Elevation: 1,716 m (5,630 ft)
- Coordinates: 4°42′S 145°14′E

Geography
- Location within Papua New Guinea
- Country: Papua New Guinea
- Province: Madang
- Range coordinates: 4°43′00″S 145°15′00″E

Adelbert Range is a mountain range in Madang Province, north-central Papua New Guinea. The highest point of the mountains is at 1,716 metres (5,630 ft).

The Northern Adelbert languages and Southern Adelbert languages are spoken in the region.

== Fauna and flora ==
As with other mountain ranges in Papua New Guinea, it is cloaked in rainforest, and is home to many rare species of fauna and flora and is highly biodiverse. Adelbert Range is home to many species of birds, including bird-of-paradise and the endemic Fire-maned Bowerbird.
