= Karkar Island =

Volcanic island in New Guinea

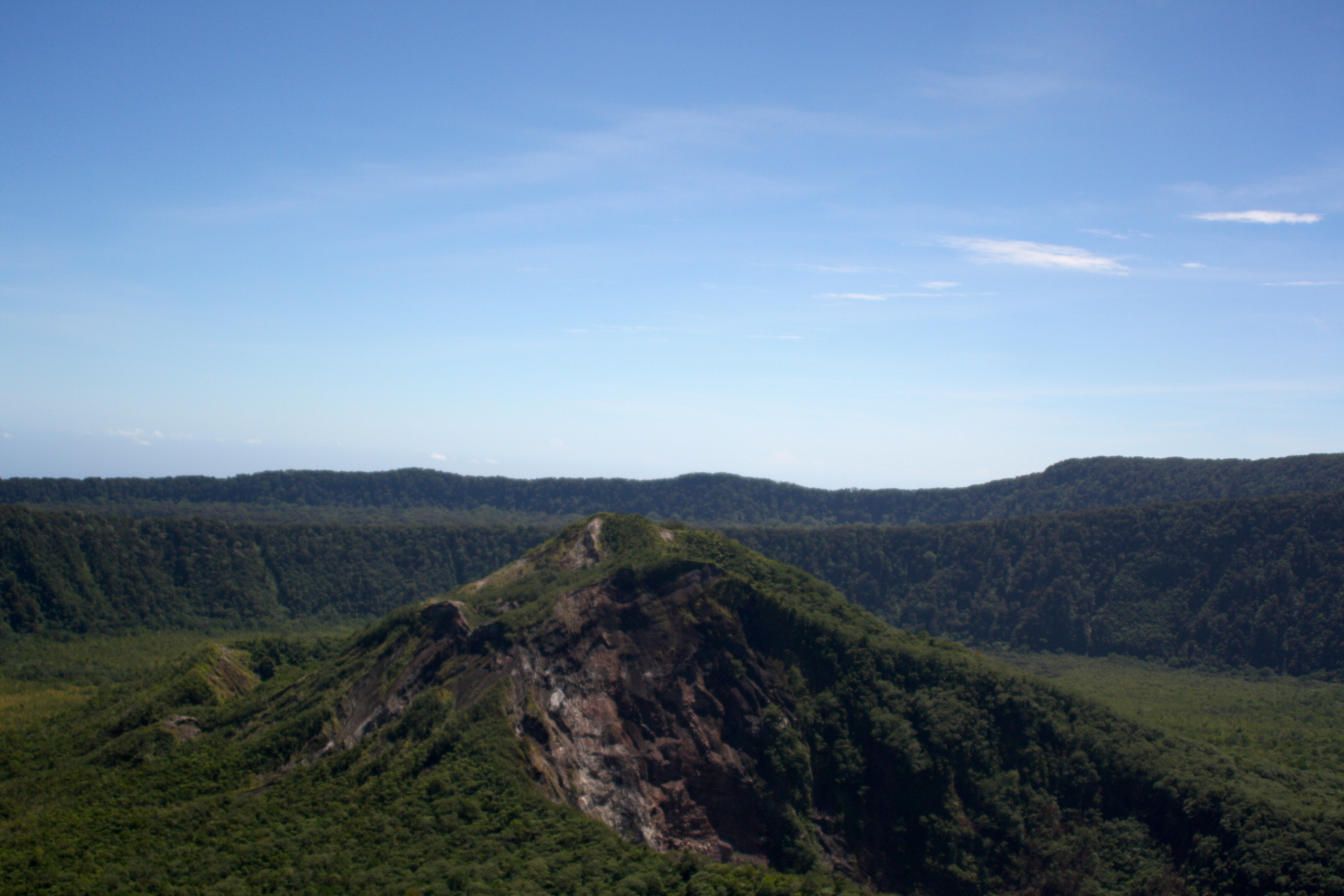
- Crater of Mount Uluman

Highest point
- Prominence: 1,839 m (6,033 ft)
- Coordinates: 4°39′S 145°58′E

Geography
- Location within Papua New Guinea
- Location: Bismarck Sea, north of Papua New Guinea

Geology
- Mountain type: Stratovolcano
- Last eruption: 12 January - 9 August 1979 / March 2014 (?)

Karkar Island is an oval-shaped volcanic island located in the Bismarck Sea, about 74 kilometres (46 mi) off the north coast of mainland Papua New Guinea in Madang Province, from which it is separated by the Isumrud Strait. The island is about 25 km (16 mi) in length and 19 km (12 mi) in width. In the centre is an active volcano with two nested calderas.

== Geography ==
The land is covered with the volcanic andesitic lava. The soil is very fertile and used for growing food crop and cash crop. The island is full of betel-nut, mustard plant and lime. The island is also known for the view from the mountain looking down to Madang town.

The latest eruptions on this island occurred in the 1970s. The 1974–1975 eruption produced a large volume of lava which covered almost 70% of the inner caldera's floor, while 1979 produced no lava flow, but killed two volcanologists, Robin Cooke and Elias Ravian. The volcano erupted as recently as February 26, 2013.

The population of approximately 70,000 is mostly Lutheran and Catholic and speaks the two languages Waskia and Takia. Most people also speak Tok Pisin, and English is taught in the schools. Neighboring islands are Bagabag (Papua New Guinea) and Manam.

A single road runs around the entire length of the island. Karkar Secondary School is the only high school. There is one hospital, Gaubin Hospital, known formally as the Edwin & Tabitha Tscharke Memorial Hospital, which is run by the Lutheran Health Service and staffed by several rotating German doctors. The hospital includes a training center for Community Health Workers.

The two main exports from the island are cacao and coconuts, which can grow in the same soil due to vast height differences. Large plantations are generally family-owned.

== History ==
The first recorded sighting by Europeans of Karkar Island was by the Spanish navigator Iñigo Órtiz de Retes on 10 August 1545 when on board of the carrack San Juan tried to return from Tidore to New Spain.

It was later visited by Willem Schouten and Jacob le Maire and called "High island". In 1643 Abel Tasman passed the island. William Dampier visited the island, probably in 1699. The volcano erupted in 1895.

During World War II, the Imperial Japanese occupied the island. The Australian 37th/52nd Battalion landed on 2 June 1944, to find that the Japanese had evacuated the island and Australian 5th Division troops landed on the island at Biu Bay and Kavilo Bay on 6 June 1944.

An excellent account of the history of Karkar Island, from the 1920s to the present day, is provided in the autobiography of Sir John Middleton Kt, OBE, My Life on Karkar Island, Papua New Guinea.

== Climate ==
Karkar island has a tropical rainforest climate (Af) with heavy to very heavy rainfall year-round.

Climate data for Karkar island (Kinim village)
Month	Jan	Feb	Mar	Apr	May	Jun	Jul	Aug	Sep	Oct	Nov	Dec	Year
Mean daily maximum °C (°F)	30.2 (86.4)	30.1 (86.2)	30.0 (86.0)	30.2 (86.4)	30.5 (86.9)	30.1 (86.2)	30.0 (86.0)	30.1 (86.2)	30.7 (87.3)	30.6 (87.1)	30.5 (86.9)	30.2 (86.4)	30.3 (86.5)
Daily mean °C (°F)	26.6 (79.9)	26.4 (79.5)	26.4 (79.5)	26.6 (79.9)	26.8 (80.2)	26.4 (79.5)	26.2 (79.2)	26.2 (79.2)	26.8 (80.2)	26.8 (80.2)	26.8 (80.2)	26.6 (79.9)	26.6 (79.8)
Mean daily minimum °C (°F)	23.0 (73.4)	22.8 (73.0)	22.9 (73.2)	23.0 (73.4)	23.1 (73.6)	22.7 (72.9)	22.5 (72.5)	22.4 (72.3)	22.9 (73.2)	23.0 (73.4)	23.1 (73.6)	23.0 (73.4)	22.9 (73.2)
Average precipitation mm (inches)	334 (13.1)	330 (13.0)	433 (17.0)	387 (15.2)	387 (15.2)	280 (11.0)	253 (10.0)	200 (7.9)	217 (8.5)	360 (14.2)	321 (12.6)	359 (14.1)	3,861 (151.8)
Source: Climate-Data.org

== See also ==
- List of volcanoes in Papua New Guinea
