= Madang languages =

Papua New Guinean language family

Madang
- Madang–Adelbert Range
- Geographic distribution: Papua New Guinea
- Linguistic classification: Northeast New Guinea and/or Trans–New Guinea: Madang – Upper Yuat; Madang
- Subdivisions: Southern Adelbert Range; Rai Coast; Croisilles; Kalam; Mabuso; etc.

Language codes
- Glottolog: mada1298
- Map: The Madang languages of New Guinea The Madang languages Trans–New Guinea languages Other Papuan languages Austronesian languages Uninhabited

The Madang or Madang–Adelbert Range languages are a language family of Papua New Guinea. They were classified as a branch of Trans–New Guinea by Stephen Wurm, followed by Malcolm Ross. William A. Foley concurs that it is "highly likely" that the Madang languages are part of TNG, although the pronouns, the usual basis for classification in TNG, have been "replaced" in Madang. Timothy Usher finds that Madang is closest to the Upper Yuat River languages and other families to its west, but does not for now address whether this larger group forms part of the TNG family.

The family is named after Madang Province and the Adelbert Range.

== History ==
Sidney Herbert Ray identified the Rai Coast family in 1919. In 1951 these were linked with the Mabuso languages by Arthur Capell to create his Madang family. John Z'graggen (1971, 1975) expanded Madang to languages of the Adelbert Range and renamed the family Madang–Adelbert Range, and Stephen Wurm (1975) adopted this as a branch of his Trans–New Guinea phylum. For the most part, Malcolm Ross's (2005) Madang family includes the same languages as Z'graggen Madang–Adelbert Range, but the internal classification is different in several respects, such as the dissolution of the Brahman branch.

== Internal classification ==
The languages are as follows:

- Madang
  - Bargam (Mugil)
  - Central Madang
    - Croisilles (reduced, = Northern Adelbert Range)
    - Mabuso
    - Mindjim
    - Rai Coast (reduced; > South Madang)
    - Yamben
  - West Madang
    - Southern Adelbert Range (Sogeram and Tomul Rivers)
    - Kalam (Kaironk River)
  - East Madang
    - Wasembo
    - Yaganon

The time depth of Madang is comparable to that of Austronesian or Indo-European.

== Pronouns ==
Ross (2000) reconstructed the pronouns as follows:

	sg	pl
1	*ya	*i
2	*na	*ni, *ta
3	*nu	

These are not the common TNG pronouns. However, Ross postulates that the TNG dual suffixes *-le and *-t remain, and suggests that the TNG pronouns live on as Kalam verbal suffixes.

== Evolution ==
Madang family reflexes of proto-Trans-New Guinea (pTNG) etyma:

=== Family-wide innovations ===
- pTNG *mbena ‘arm’ > proto-Madang *kambena (accretion of *ka-)
- pTNG *mb(i,u)t(i,u)C ‘fingernail’ > proto-Madang *timbi(n,t) (metathesis)
- pTNG *(n)ok ‘water’ replaced by proto-Madang *yaŋgu

=== Croisilles ===
Garuh language:

- muki ‘brain’ < *muku
- bi ‘guts’ < *simbi
- hap ‘cloud’ < *samb(V)
- balamu ‘firelight’ < *mbalaŋ
- wani ‘name’ < *[w]ani ‘who?’
- wus ‘wind, breeze’ < *kumbutu
- kalam ‘moon’ < *kala(a,i)m
- neg- ‘to watch’ < *nVŋg- ‘see, know’
- ma ‘taro’ < *mV
- ahi ‘sand’ < *sa(ŋg,k)asiŋ

Pay language:

- in- ‘sleep’ < *kin(i,u)-
- kawus ‘smoke’ < *kambu
- tawu-na ‘ashes’ < *sambu
- imun ‘hair’ < *sumu(n,t)
- ano ‘who’ < *[w]ani

Proto-Northern Adelbert:

- *waben ‘arm, hand’ < *mbena
- *bab ‘older brother’ < *[mb]amba
- *ked ‘blood’ < *ke(nj,s)a
- *gemaŋ ‘heart’ < *kamu
- *kumaŋ ‘neck, nape’ < *kuma(n, ŋ)
- *kasin ‘mosquito’ < *kasin
- *um- ‘die’ < *kumV-
- *in- ‘sleep’ < *kin(i,u)[m]-
- *ag- 'see' ‘know, hear, see’ < *nVŋg-
- *me (+verb) ‘NEG’ < *ma- (+verb)
- *yag ‘water’ < *ok[V]
- *tak ‘leaf’ < *sasak

=== Kalam ===
Kalam language (most closely related to the Rai Coast languages):

- meg ‘teeth’ < *maŋgat[a]
- md-magi ‘heart’ < *mundu-maŋgV
- mkem ‘cheek’ < *mVkVm ‘cheek, chin’
- sb ‘excrement, guts’ < *simbi
- muk ‘milk, sap, brain’ < *muku
- yman ‘louse’ < *iman
- yb ‘name’ < *imbi
- kdl ‘root’ < *kindil
- malaŋ ‘flame’ < *mbalaŋ
- melk ‘(fire or day)light’ < *(m,mb)elak
- kn- ‘to sleep, lie down’ < *kini(i,u)[m]-
- kum- ‘die’ < *kumV-
- md- < *mVna- ‘be, stay’
- nŋ-, ng- ‘perceive, know, see, hear, etc’ < *nVŋg-
- kawnan ‘shadow, spirit’ < *k(a,o)
- nan, takn ‘moon’ < *takVn[V]
- magi ‘round thing, egg, fruit, etc.’ < *maŋgV
- ami ‘mother’ < *am(a,i,u)
- b ‘man’ < *ambi
- bapi, -ap ‘father’ < *mbapa, *ap
- saŋ ‘women’s dancing song’ < *saŋ
- ma- ‘negator’ < *ma-
- an ‘who’ < *[w]ani

=== Rai Coast ===
Dumpu language:

- man- ‘be, stay’ < *mVna-
- mekh ‘teeth’ < *maŋgat[a]
- im ‘louse’ < *iman
- munu ‘heart’ < *mundun ‘inner organs’
- kum- ‘die’ < *kumV-
- kono ‘shadow’ < *k(a,o)nan
- kini- ‘sleep’ < *kin(i,u)[m]-
- ra- ‘take’ < *(nd,t)a-
- urau ‘long’ < *k(o,u)ti(mb,p)V
- gra ‘dry’ < *(ŋg,k)atata

=== Southern Adelbert ===
Sirva language:

- mun(zera) ‘be, stay’ < *mVna-
- kaja ‘blood’ < *kenja
- miku ‘brain’ < *muku
- simbil ‘guts’ < *simbi
- tipi ‘fingernail’ < *mb(i,)ut(i,u)C (metathesis)
- iːma ‘louse’ < *iman
- ibu ‘name’ < *imbi
- kanumbu ‘wind’ < *kumbutu
- mundu(ma) ‘nose’ < *mundu
- kaːsi ‘sand’ < *sa(ŋg,k)asiŋ
- apapara ‘butterfly’ < *apa(pa)ta
- kumu- ‘die’ < *kumV-
- ŋg- ‘see’ < *nVŋg-

== Proto-language ==
The following selected reconstructions of Proto-Madang by Ross (2014) are from the Trans-New Guinea database. Proto-Trans–New Guinea reconstructions are from Andrew Pawley and Harald Hammarström (2018).

gloss	Proto-Madang	Proto-Trans–New Guinea
head	*gat(a,i)(m)	*kV(mb,p)utu; mVtVna
hair	*imunu	*(nd,s)umu(n,t)[V]; *iti
ear	*kaun(i)	*kand(i,e)k[V]
eye	*amu	*ŋg(a,u)mu; *(ŋg,k)iti-maŋgV; *nVpV
nose	*mutu(gu)	*mundu
tooth	*make	*titi
tongue	*mele	*me(l,n)e; *mbilaŋ
leg	*kani(n)	*k(a,o)nd(a,o)[C]; *kitu
louse	*[n]iman	*(n)iman
bird	*kVbara	*yaka[i]; *n[e]i
egg	*munaka	*mun(a,e,i)ka; *maŋgV
blood	*ka(d,r)a; *kara	*ke(nj,s)a
bone	*kwaten	*kondaC
skin	*ga(n,r)a	*(ŋg,k)a(nd,t)apu
breast	*amu(na)	*amu
tree	*tari	*inda
woman	*na-gali(k)	*panV
sky	*ku(m,b)ut	*kumut, *tumuk; *samb[V]
sun	*kamali	*kamali; *ketane
moon	*kalam; *takun	*kal(a,i)m; *takVn[V]
water	*yag(V)	*(n)ok[V]
fire	*k(a,e)dap	*k(a,o)nd(a,u)p; *inda; *kambu
stone	*namanu	*[na]muna; *kamb(a,u)na
name	*ibi; *wañim	*imbi; *wani
eat	*(n,ñ)a	*na-
one	*kati(ŋ,g)a	
two	*arigita	*ta(l,t)(a,e)

== CLDF Dataset ==
- Z'graggen, J A. (1980) A comparative word list of the Northern Adelbert Range Languages, Madang Province, Papua New Guinea. Canberra: Pacific Linguistics. (CLDF dataset on Zenodo doi:10.5281/zenodo.3537580)
