= Hansemann =

Hansemann is a surname. Notable people with the surname include:

- Adolph von Hansemann (1826–1903), German businessman and banker
- David Hansemann (1790–1864), Prussian politician and banker
- David Paul von Hansemann (1858–1920), German pathologist
- Ferdinand von Hansemann (1861–1900), Prussian landlord and politician
- Johann Wilhelm Adolf Hansemann (1784–1862), German entomologist and insect dealer
- Ottilie von Hansemann (1840–1919), German women's rights activist

== See also ==
- Hansemann Mountains, a mountain range in Papua New Guinea
- Hasemann's Daughters (film), a 1920 German silent film
