= Franz Urbig =

German banker

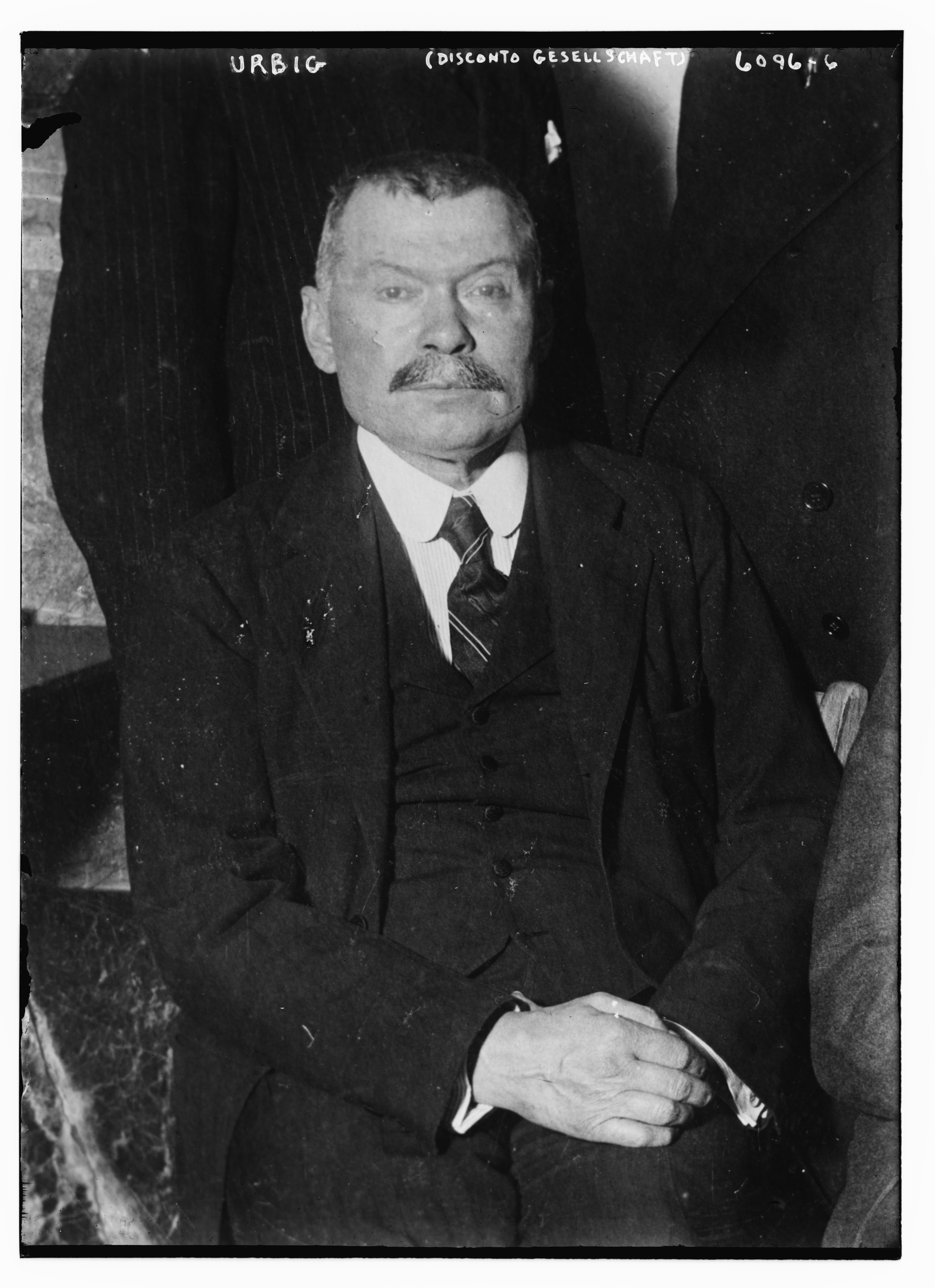
- 1900
- Born: 23 January 1864; Luckenwalde, Saxony, Kingdom of Prussia
- Died: 28 September 1944 (aged 80); Babelsberg (Potsdam), Brandenburg, Germany
- Occupation: Banker
- Spouse: Dorothea Augusta Anne Seebeck 1881–1968
- Children: 1. Marie Louise Urbig / Gericke; 2. Elisabeth Urbig

Franz Urbig (23 January 1864 – 28 September 1944) was a German banker. He joined the Disconto-Gesellschaft as a trainee on 15 July 1884 and built much of his career and reputation within this bank in Southeast Asia during the final part of the nineteenth century. Between 1902 and 1929, when the bank merged with the larger Deutsche Bank, he was a partner in the Disconto-Gesellschaft. Between 1930 and his death in 1944 he was chairman of the supervisory board at the enlarged Deutsche Bank. His long career was not without controversy.

After he died the Villa Urbig, the large family home on the western edge of Berlin which he had commissioned in 1915 and which had been designed by Ludwig Mies van der Rohe, brought Urbig enhanced posthumous publicity in the English-speaking world of a kind he cannot have anticipated. It became the setting for some of the most carefully staged and widely viewed press photographs of the post-war period. During the first part of 1945 surviving family members were forcibly ushered out by Soviet troops: three months later British Prime Minister Churchill moved in with a large retinue of staff. The plan was for Churchill to use the residence for the duration of the Potsdam Conference, but in the event, following a United Kingdom national election in July 1945, Churchill moved out and Prime Minister Attlee moved in for the conference's later stages.

== Life ==
=== Provenance and early years ===
Franz Urbig was born in Luckenwalde, a small town south of Berlin along the main railway line towards Halle and Leipzig: Urbig himself would later describe Luckenwalde as a "typical manufacturing town of its time". His father worked in the cloth trade, in the end becoming a factory foreman in a textiles company. Franz Urbig grew up in surprisingly modest circumstances and was forced to drop out of school following the early death of his father. He worked between 1878 and 1884 as a clerk at the district court house in Luckenwalde. It was here that he came to the attention of Ferdinand von Hansemann (1861-1900), a young lawyer who would later come to wider prominence for his shrill anti-Polish nationalism. The lawyer came from an exceptionally well connected family: the most relevant of those connections for Urbig's future career was his father, the entrepreneur-banker Adolph von Hansemann (1826-1903) who had been chief executive officer ("Geschäftsführer"), since the death of his father in 1864, of the Disconto-Gesellschaft, at that time an aggressively expansionist bank with extensive interests abroad, notably in Southeast Asia. Based on his son's recommendations, Adolph von Hansemann accepted Urbig's application for a traineeship, which commenced on 15 July 1884.

=== Disconto-Gesellschaft (bank) ===
After joining the bank Urbig mastered the theory and practice of banking with what several sources refer to as "iron energy". Most of the parts of the world in which the bank saw the greatest opportunities for expansion were component territories of the British or French empires. He used his spare time to master English and French. In 1889, still aged only 25, Urbig was entrusted with the role of "Registratur des Chefkabinetts", which in effect meant he was employed as secretary to the board of directors.

=== Shanghai years ===
In 1894 he was sent to Shanghai which was where the recently established Deutsch-Asiatische Bank (DAB / 德華銀) had its main office. The bank had been set up and funded in 1889 by a consortium of thirteen major and private German banks, of which the Disconto-Gesellschaft was one. It became one of the leading foreign banks in China. Appointed "Prokurist", Urbig enjoyed authority to make commitments on behalf of the bank. In 1895 he took on the leadership of the DAB's subsidiary in Tianjin. He also set up its subsidiary in Kolkata, which opened the same year. The move was not without its political sensitivities since Kolkata was still the focus of Britain's fantastically lucrative opium trade and an important commercial centre in British India. Although investee companies welcomed the newly increased availability of investment capital from Germany, the political authorities were more conflicted over some of the issues arising. Urbig travelled extensively during his time in Southeast Asia. He was in Kolkata in 1897 where he oversaw the rebuilding of the bank branch following that year's earthquake. Back in Shanghai, in 1896 Urbig had been appointed to membership of the bank's board of directors. In 1896 and again in 1898 it was Urbig who led the negotiations in respect of two very large DAB bank loans to the Chinese government. Although China had never been incorporated into the British Empire, there was by this time intensifying jostling between the British, French and German governments for the inclusion of China in their respective spheres of imperial influence: providing German capital to a government that till now had accepted western capital investment almost exclusively from the British raised political sensitivities which made Urbig's negotiations particularly difficult. Recalled to Shanghai, following a brief visit home to Germany, in 1898 he was mandated to work on setting up the bank's Hong Kong operation. In 1900 he was moved to London where he was briefly involved in setting up the local branch of Disconto-Gesellschaft, of which he became deputy chairman. On 23 November 1902, having returned to Berlin, he became a "Geschräftsinhaber", meaning that he was admitted to co-ownership and board membership of the Disconto-Gesellschaft. Aged 38 he was, by traditional standards, young for such a promotion.

=== "Geschräftsinhaber" (partner) ===
His successes in Southeast Asia led naturally to the focus of his attention after 1902 being largely on the Disconto-Gesellschaft's international business. He took a lead in building up the funding of international trade. In 1902 the annual value of foreign trade financed by the bank broke through the 100 Million mark barrier: by 1913, under Urbig's watch, it had reached 246.3 million marks. He was particularly involved in extending the bank's financial and commercial interests in China, and took a leading role in the bank's funding of the construction of the Shantung Railway (as it was identified in western sources of the time). This strategy also involved sustaining close connections, both personally and institutionally, with the Shanghai-based DAB, of which he was a member of the supervisory board, appointed supervisory board chairman in 1910. By 1903 Urbig had already been employed for nearly twenty years at the bank, and the death that year of the bank's dynamic chief executive, Adolph von Hansemann necessarily increased further Urbig's own prestige and influence within the bank. Alongside interests in Southeast Asia, during the first part of the twentieth century the bank was becoming increasingly prominent in Germany's recently acquired African colonies. Here Urbig oversaw major financing projects including those involving the Otavi Mines in South West Africa and the development/exploitation activities of the German East Africa Company, all backed by an underlying vision for the development and expansion of global trade.

=== War and postwar period ===
The onset of the First World War destroyed a large part of Franz Urbig's life's work. The globalisation of world trade which up till 1914 had underpinned more than three decades of rapidly growing prosperity - especially for western Europe and the United States - was thrown into reverse for more than a generation. In 1919 he accepted the politicians' invitation to attend the Paris Peace Conference in his capacity as an internationally acknowledged German expert on finance and trade. At the conference he made the case that no country - not even the United States of America - would be capable of sustaining the financial burdens which the victors proposed to impose on the new German republic. However, in the spirit of mutual hatred engendered by four years of bitter fighting and the accompanying war-time propaganda to which populations had been subjected on the home front, it became clear that the reparations demanded by the French leadership would not be significantly scaled back by the hoped for pressure from the British and Americans, notwithstanding the concerns eloquently expressed by at least one respected member of the British delegation. Urbig resigned his mandate as a member of the German delegation, with the parting advice that the conditions proposed (and subsequently imposed) by the war's military victors could never provide the basis for a lasting peace. He was again a member of the German delegation at the Spa Conference of 1920, but the Supreme War Council delegates were, as before, not minded to attend to the concerns of the German government representatives.

=== Currency crisis ===
During the culmination in 1923 of the Hyperinflation crisis Urbig served as chairman of the Currency Committee of the Central Association of German Banks and Bank Businesses. At the same time he was a board member at the "Rentenbank", the Berlin-based national bank set up that year to deal with the currency crisis. He was centrally involved in the introduction, in November 1923, of the German Rentenmark, a new currency which would indeed prove more stable than the old. He had been invited to accept the position of "National Currency Commissioner", but his response that his appointment should involve both repudiation of the burdensome reparations imposed at Versailles and the selective unwinding of the "excessively progressive" social reforms introduced since 1919 evidently led those responsible to conclude that Urbig, despite his financial expertise and experience, would not, after all, be an appropriate currency commissioner. The job instead went to Hjalmar Schacht, formerly of the Dresdner Bank, while the implementation of the Dawes Plan, at around the same time as the currency reforms took effect, went a long way to address the reparations issue. In 1924 Franz Urbig was one of seven German nationals appointed to the newly formed General Council of the Reichsbank (German central bank) (The other seven members were non-Germans, nominated by representatives of the creditor nations.) The creation of this General Council was part of a broader reconfiguration of the Reichsbank constitution which had been agreed under pressure from creditors as a pre-condition for the Dawes Plan in the so-called "London agreement" (which also contained a number of more overtly political provisions), signed off on 29 August 1924.

=== Bank merger ===
As part of the 1929 merger of the Disconto-Gesellschaft with the larger (but conspicuously less well capitalised) Deutsche Bank Franz Urbig, who was reaching what many would have seen as a conventional retirement age, became a member of the oversight board of the merged entity. The next year he was elected to chair it. Nevertheless, he now stepped back from his day-to-day executive responsibilities.

=== National Socialism ===
In January 1933 the Hitler government exploited the national parliamentary deadlock to take power. The new government lost no time in transforming Germany into a one-party dictatorship. Antisemitism, hitherto a shrill slogan of populist opposition street politicians, now became a core underpinning of government strategy. On 18 January 1934 Urbig expressed his concern that the directors of Deutsche Bank must absolutely, and in the interests of Deutsche Bank, avoid any suggestion following some future a change in the political wind, that the bank board had done anything that might contribute to the idea that non-Aryan board members should resign. Nevertheless, more recent sources state that both Oscar Wassermann and Theodor Frank were "driven" to resign from the Deutsche Bank board in 1933. Georg Solmssen, a Jew by birth who had subsequently been baptised a Christian, managed to hang on as a board member till 1934 and then switched to the supervisory board, from which he was forced to resign only in 1936. There is no sign that Franz Urbig was a particular supporter of the National Socialists (nor of any other political party), but there is also no sign that he saw it as part of his role to stand out against the tide of government antisemitism. According to at least one source, as early as 1933 the supervisory board of the bank included at least one member who had been planted there by the government.

Franz Urbig died at his family home, just outside Potsdam, in September 1944.

== Personal ==
Franz Urbig married Dorothea Augusta Anne Seebeck (10 September 1881 - 22 July 1968) at Bremen on 25 May 1907. The marriage was followed the births of the couple's two daughters. Marie Louise Gericke and Elisabeth Urbig. Dr. Andreas Gericke is their grandson. Their younger daughter, Elisabeth, died unmarried.

== Villa Urbig ==
In 1915 Franz Urbig commissioned the building of a family villa on the shores of the Griebnitzsee (lake) at Babelsberg, just outside Potsdam. The architect, Ludwig Mies van der Rohe was little known at the time, though he would later - after radically changing his approach - achieve notability as a pioneer of modernist architecture, becoming in 1930 the last director of the Bauhaus School in (since relocating from Weimar in 1925) Dessau. The Villa Urbig was constructed between 1915 and 1917. It was here that the Urbigs' children grew up.

The Villa Urbig was used as a backdrop for the 1935 UFA comedy film Frischer Wind aus Kanada, directed by Paul Hörbiger.

Between 16 July and 25 July 1945 the Villa Ubrig was briefly home to Winston Churchill, who was attending the Potsdam Conference nearby. He was accompanied by his 21-year-old daughter (who stayed on for an extra week after her father returned to England) and a substantial retinue of support staff. The British took the precaution of bringing with them a large quantity of kitchen equipment, as wellas their own cutlery, glasses plates and dishes. Shortly after arriving Churchill complained that his bed had broken and must be repaired at once. Under the conditions of the time the usual solution would have been to repair it using parts extracted from a dining table, but since a large banquet was scheduled for a few days later, no suitable table could be spared. Churchill's bed was nevertheless repaired using improvised parts. The British Delegation Arrangements Administrator had one or two additional and very precisely communicated requirements, as a result of which a temporary "military hairdresser" was hastily installed in a neighbouring property, while arrangements were made for the British to use the swimming pool in the garden of the nearby "Villa Quandt". After a plague of mosquitoes descended on the villa, all the buildings were thoroughly sprayed and mosquito nets procured. Large formal balls were organised for the evenings of 18 and 21 July. Mr. Churchill departed on 28 July and his place, both at the Villa Urbig and at the conference table was taken by his former deputy Clement Attlee who had insisted on accompanying Churchill to the conference, but had up till this point been relegated to more modest accommodation in the town. (In England the party led by Attlee had already won the 1945 General Election even before Churchill's party set sail for the Potsdam conference, but it took several weeks before all the votes could be counted and the results confirmed and declared.)

After the war the Villa Urbig found itself in Berlin's Soviet occupation zone (relaunched in October 1949 as the Soviet sponsored German Democratic Republic (East Germany). It was used for many years as a guest house for the "Walter Ulbricht" [East] German Academy for political and legal studies ("Deutsche Akademie für Staats- und Rechtswissenschaft "Walter Ulbricht" "). It was also used for more directly educational purposes, including the training of East German diplomats.

Following 1990 the Villa Urbig reverted to private ownership. In 2005 it was acquired by Theodor Semmelhaack, a successful businessman and property developer who comprehensively restored it. Semmelhaack attracted criticism in English newspapers in 2006 when he refused to allow a plaque to be placed on his "private residence" celebrating its Churchill connections. Under pressure he nevertheless agreed that Mary Soames, who by this point was Winston Churchill's only surviving child, was very welcome to visit and look around: "It's empty at the moment. But I can get someone from my office to let her in".

By 2009 the villa had become home to an icon of German capitalism almost as iconic as Franz Urbig himself. Having for some time lived in the villa as a tenant, that year the software entrepreneur Hasso Plattner purchased it.
