= Bagupi language =

Endangered Madang language of Papua New Guinea

Bagupi
- Native to: Papua New Guinea
- Region: Madang Province
- Ethnicity: 75 (2000 census)
- Native speakers: (50 cited 2000)
- Language family: Trans–New Guinea: Madang; Croisilles linkage; Mabuso; Hanseman; Bagupi

Language codes
- ISO 639-3: bpi
- Glottolog: bagu1252
- ELP: Bagupi
- Bagupi is classified as Definitely Endangered by the UNESCO Atlas of the World's Languages in Danger.

Bagupi is a nearly extinct Madang language of Papua New Guinea. The language is under pressure from neighboring large languages such as Garuh, and Tok Pisin, which is taking its toll. Spoken in the Madang Province of Papua New Guinea. Spoken at the headwaters of the Gogol River, west of Mabanob, northwest of Madang town. Very little is still known about this unique language situated in Papua New Guinea.
