= Kare language (Papuan) =

Madang language of Papua New Guinea

Kare
- Region: Papua New Guinea
- Native speakers: (380 cited 1981)
- Language family: Madang: Central Madang; Mabuso; Hanseman; Kare

Language codes
- ISO 639-3: kmf
- Glottolog: kare1341

Kare is a Madang language of Papua New Guinea. It was recognized as being somewhat divergent by Malcolm Ross.
