= Wamas language =

Madang language of Papua New Guinea

Wamas
- Native to: Papua New Guinea
- Region: Madang Province
- Native speakers: (220 cited 2000)
- Language family: Trans–New Guinea: Madang; Croisilles linkage; Mabuso; Hanseman; Wamas

Language codes
- ISO 639-3: wmc
- Glottolog: wama1247
- ELP: Wamas

Wamas is a Madang language of Papua New Guinea.
