= Rempi language =

Madang language of Papua New Guinea

Rempi
- Native to: Papua New Guinea
- Region: Madang Province
- Native speakers: 1,600 (2003)
- Language family: Trans–New Guinea: Madang; Croisilles linkage; Mabuso; Hanseman; Rempi

Language codes
- ISO 639-3: rmp
- Glottolog: remp1241

Rempi is a Madang language of Papua New Guinea.
