= Matepi language =

Madang language of Papua New Guinea

Matepi
- Native to: Papua New Guinea
- Region: Madang Province
- Native speakers: 280 (2003)
- Language family: Trans–New Guinea: Madang; Croisilles linkage; Mabuso; Hanseman; Matepi

Language codes
- ISO 639-3: mqe
- Glottolog: mate1260

Matepi is a Madang language of Papua New Guinea.
