= Nake language =

Madang language of Papua New Guinea

Nake
- Native to: Papua New Guinea
- Region: Madang Province
- Native speakers: (170 cited 1981)
- Language family: Trans–New Guinea: Madang; Croisilles linkage; Mabuso; Hanseman; Nake

Language codes
- ISO 639-3: nbk
- Glottolog: nake1240
- ELP: Nake

Nake is a Madang language of Papua New Guinea.
