= Wagi language =

Papuan language

Wagi
- Kamba
- Foran
- Native to: Papua New Guinea
- Region: Madang Province
- Native speakers: 3,400 (2003)
- Language family: Trans–New Guinea: Madang; Croisilles linkage; Mabuso; Hanseman; Wagi

Language codes
- ISO 639-3: fad
- Glottolog: wagi1249

Wagi, also known as Kamba, Kauris, Silibob, Mis Furan, is a Papuan language of Papua New Guinea.

== Phonology ==
	Labial	Alveolar	Palatal	Velar	Glottal
Stop	p b	t d		k g	
Nasal	m	n		(ŋ) <ng>	
Trill		r			
Tap/Flap		ɾ <ŕ>			
Fricative	β <w> f	s			h
Approximant		l	j <y>		
Implosive	ɓ <q>				

	Front	Back
High	i	u
Mid	e	o
Low	ɛ <é>	ɑ <a>
