= Girawa =

Girawa may be,

- Girawa (woreda), Ethiopia
- Girawa language, New Guinea
