= Gal language =

Madang language of Papua New Guinea

Gal
- Native to: Papua New Guinea
- Region: Madang Province
- Native speakers: 340 (2003)
- Language family: Trans–New Guinea: Madang; Croisilles linkage; Mabuso; Hanseman; Gal

Language codes
- ISO 639-3: gap
- Glottolog: gall1278

Gal is a Madang language of Papua New Guinea. It is closely related to Baimak, and sometimes goes by that name.
