= Ate language =

Ate may be:

- Garus language
- Arhe language
