= Munit =

Munit may be,

- Munit language
- Munit Mesfin
