= Ottilie von Hansemann =

German women's rights activist

Ottilie von Hansemann (11 April 1840 – 12 December 1919) was a German women's rights activist, significant patroness of the women's movement in Prussia, and a champion for the right of women to attend German universities, to participate in university classes alongside their male cohorts, and to live in student residence halls built specifically for female students.

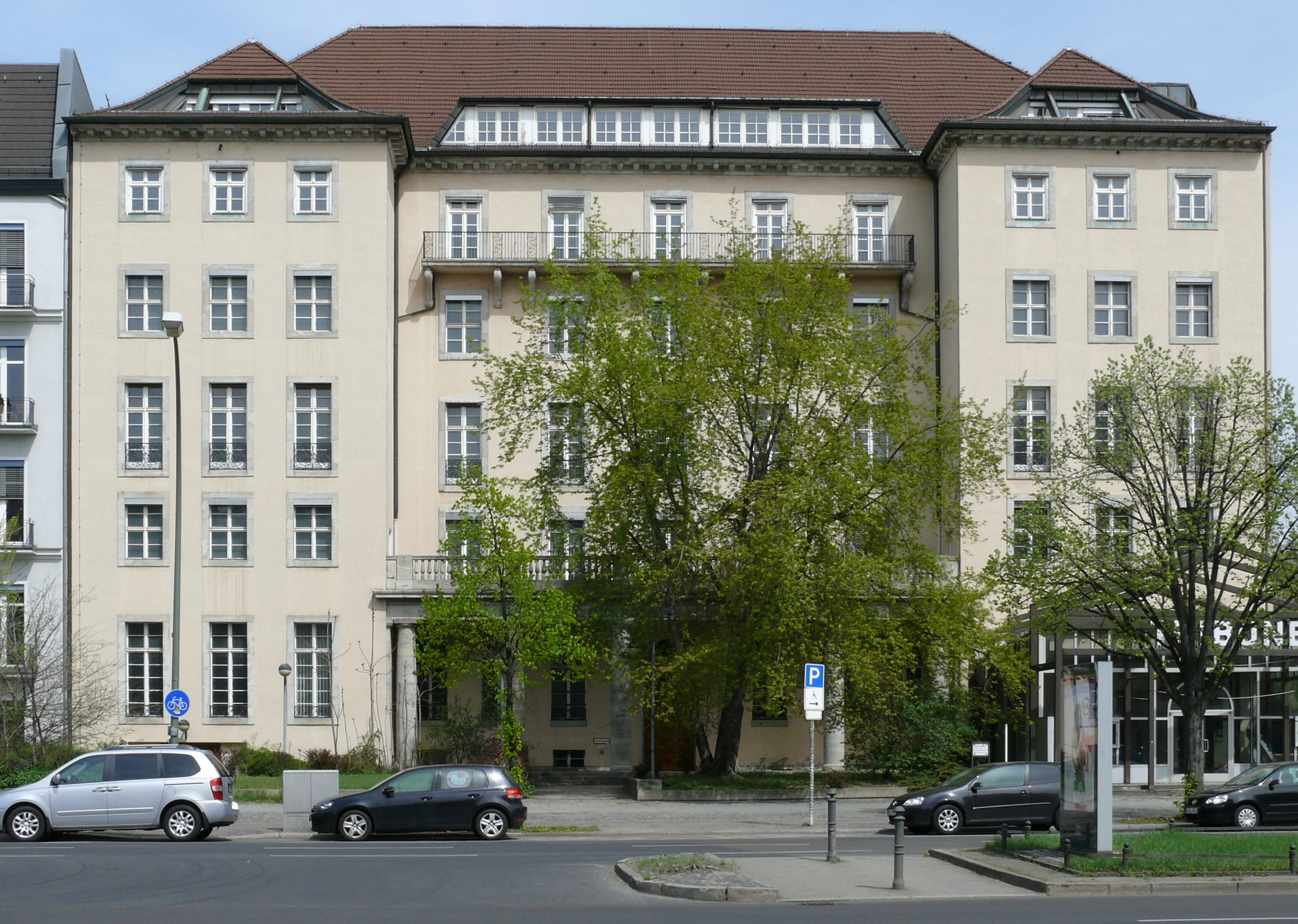
Haus Ottilie von Hansemann

In 1860, Ottilie (born von Kusserow) married Adolph von Hansemann (27 July 1826 – 9 December 1903). Ottilie's husband was a notable Prussian industrialist and manager of the Disconto-Gesellschaft, a large financial holding founded in 1851 and headquartered in Berlin, which in 1929 merged with Deutsche Bank. Ottilie and her husband had two children, Ferdinand and Davide Eveline von Hansemann.

At the turn of the twentieth century, German women's struggle for higher education focused on their being integrated into existing universities. In Germany, the women's movement focused on a range of social and design issues, including land reform, the urban gardening movement, centralized housekeeping, housing inspection, and residences for female workers and students. In 1907, Ottilie von Hansemann offered the rector of the Friedrich Wilhelm University (renamed Humboldt University in 1949) in Berlin 200,000 Reichsmarks as a scholarship endowment in exchange for his allowing women to be admitted to the university and to attend classes together with male students. In 1908, after the Prussian government opened universities to women, the rector of Friedrich Wilhelm University requested the promised financial gift from Ottilie, but she refused because the law admitting women to German universities contained a stipulation that for "special reasons" a professor could petition the education minister to bar women from his courses. When German Culture Minister Ludwig Holle was unwilling to revise this exceptional paragraph, Ottilie withdrew her endowment offer to the university and instead invested the money in the construction of the Viktoria-Studienhaus (a student residence for women) on the former Berliner Allee (since 1957 Otto-Suhr-Allee) in the Charlottenburg neighborhood of Berlin. Opened in 1915, the Viktoria-Studienhaus was also referred to as Haus Ottilie von Hansemann, in honor of its royal patron (Crown Princess Victoria) and its largest donor, respectively.
