= RPT =

RPT can refer to:

== Political parties ==
- Rally of the Togolese People, Togo, 1969–2012
- Republican Party of Texas, United States

== Science and technology ==
- Rapid phase transition, in liquefied petroleum gas
- RPT, the Repeat instruction in some computer architectures
- Registered Physical Therapist

== Other uses ==
- Rapting language, on New Guinea (by ISO 639 code)
- Registered Piano Technician, Piano Technicians Guild certification
- River Park Towers
- Refugee Paralympic Team at the 2020 Summer Paralympics
