= MQW =

MQW or mqw may refer to:

- MQW, the IATA and FAA LID code for Telfair–Wheeler Airport, Georgia, United States
- mqw, the ISO 639-3 code for Murupi language, Papua New Guinea
