= Isebe language =

Papuan language of Papua New Guinea

Isebe
- Native to: Papua New Guinea
- Region: Madang Province
- Native speakers: (1,200 cited 2000)
- Language family: Trans–New Guinea: Madang; Croisilles linkage; Mabuso?; Gum; Isebe

Language codes
- ISO 639-3: igo
- Glottolog: iseb1246

Isebe is a Papuan language of Papua New Guinea.
