= Amele language =

Papuan language of Papua New Guinea

Amele
- Native to: Papua New Guinea
- Region: Madang Province
- Native speakers: (5,300 cited 1987)
- Language family: Trans–New Guinea: Madang; Croisilles linkage; Mabuso?; Gum; Amele

Language codes
- ISO 639-3: aey
- Glottolog: amel1241

Amele is a Papuan language of Papua New Guinea. Dialects are Huar, Jagahala and Haija.

Amele is notable for having 32 possessive classes, over 69,000 finite forms and 860 infinitive forms of the verb.

== Phonology ==
Amele has 5 vowels: /i, ɛ, æ, u, ɔ/.

Consonants
		Labial	Alveolar	Palatal	Velar	Glottal
Nasal		m	n			
Stop	voiceless		t		k	ʔ
Stop	voiced	b	d		g	
Fricative		f	s	ʝ		h
Approximant			l			

== Grammar ==
Amele has seven tense-aspect categories, including four past tenses:

- past habitual
- remote past
- yesterday’s past
- today’s past
- plus present
- future
- relative future
