= Mosimo language =

Madang language of Papua New Guinea

Mosimo
- Native to: Papua New Guinea
- Region: Madang Province
- Native speakers: (50 cited 2000)
- Language family: Trans–New Guinea: Madang; Croisilles linkage; Mabuso; Hanseman; Mosimo

Language codes
- ISO 639-3: mqv
- Glottolog: mosi1248
- ELP: Mosimo

Mosimo is a nearly extinct Madang language of Papua New Guinea.
