= Baimak language =

Madang language of Papua New Guinea

Baimak
- Native to: Papua New Guinea
- Region: Madang Province
- Native speakers: 650 (2003)
- Language family: Trans–New Guinea: Madang; Croisilles linkage; Mabuso; Hanseman; Baimak

Language codes
- ISO 639-3: bmx
- Glottolog: baim1245

Baimak is a Madang language of Papua New Guinea. It is closely related to Gal, which also goes by the name Baimak.
