= Panim language =

Papuan language of Papua New Guinea

Panim
- Native to: Papua New Guinea
- Region: Madang Province
- Native speakers: 12 (2019)
- Language family: Trans–New Guinea: Madang; Croisilles linkage; Mabuso?; Gum; Panim

Language codes
- ISO 639-3: pnr
- Glottolog: pani1258

Panim is a Papuan language of Papua New Guinea. Panim speakers Mr. Lihot Wagadu and others have been working with linguists from Living Tongues Institute for Endangered Languages to create a Panim Talking Dictionary, hosted at Swarthmore College.
