= Saruga language =

Madang language

Saruga
- Native to: Papua New Guinea
- Region: Madang Province
- Native speakers: (130 cited 1981)
- Language family: Trans–New Guinea: Madang; Croisilles linkage; Mabuso; Hanseman; Saruga

Language codes
- ISO 639-3: sra
- Glottolog: saru1243
- ELP: Saruga

Saruga is a Madang language of Papua New Guinea.
