= Yoidik language =

Madang language of Papua New Guinea

Yoidik
- Native to: Papua New Guinea
- Region: Madang Province
- Native speakers: 770 (2003)
- Language family: Trans–New Guinea: Madang; Croisilles linkage; Mabuso; Hanseman; Yoidik

Language codes
- ISO 639-3: ydk
- Glottolog: yoid1240

Yoidik is a Madang language of Papua New Guinea.
