= GMU =

GMU may refer to:

- Gaelic medium unit (in Scottish education)
- George Mason University, in Virginia, United States
- Georgian Mathematical Union
- IATA Airport Code for Greenville Downtown Airport, in South Carolina, United States
- Guangzhou Medical University, in China
- Guarded Memory Unit, a feature in Intel i960
- Guglielmo Marconi University, in Italy
- Guizhou Medical University, in China
- Gulf Medical University, in the UAE
- ISO language code for Gumalu language
