= Bau language (New Guinea) =

Papuan language of Papua New Guinea

Bau
- Native to: Papua New Guinea
- Region: Madang Province
- Native speakers: (3,200 cited 2000)
- Language family: Trans–New Guinea: Madang; Croisilles linkage; Mabuso?; Gum; Bau

Language codes
- ISO 639-3: bbd
- Glottolog: bauu1244

Bau (Amale) is a Papuan language of Papua New Guinea.
