= Silopi language =

Madang language of Papua New Guinea

Silopi
- Native to: Papua New Guinea
- Region: Madang Province
- Native speakers: 180 (2003)
- Language family: Trans–New Guinea: Madang; Croisilles linkage; Mabuso; Hanseman; Silopi

Language codes
- ISO 639-3: xsp
- Glottolog: silo1240
- ELP: Silopi

Silopi is a Madang language of Papua New Guinea.
