= Samosa language =

Language of Papua New Guinea

Samosa
- Native to: Papua New Guinea
- Region: Madang Province
- Native speakers: (90 cited 2000)
- Language family: Trans–New Guinea: Madang; Croisilles linkage; Mabuso; Hanseman; Samosa

Language codes
- ISO 639-3: swm
- Glottolog: samo1306
- ELP: Samosa

Samosa is a Madang language of Papua New Guinea.
