= Utu language =

Madang language of Papua New Guinea

Utu
- Native to: Papua New Guinea
- Region: Madang Province
- Native speakers: (1,010 cited 2000 census)
- Language family: Trans–New Guinea: Madang; Croisilles linkage; Mabuso; Hanseman; Utu

Language codes
- ISO 639-3: utu
- Glottolog: utuu1240

Utu is a Madang language of Papua New Guinea.
