= Sihan language =

One of the languages of Papua New Guinea

Sihan
- Native to: Papua New Guinea
- Region: Madang Province
- Native speakers: 570 (2003)
- Language family: Trans–New Guinea: Madang; Croisilles linkage; Mabuso?; Gum; Sihan

Language codes
- ISO 639-3: snr
- Glottolog: siha1245

Sihan is a Papuan language of Papua New Guinea.
