= Mawan =

Mawan may refer to the following towns in China:

- Ma Wan, Hong Kong
- Mawan, Guizhou (麻万镇), in Dushan County
- Mawan, Hubei (马湾镇), in Tianmen, Hubei
- Mawan language, a Madang language of Papua New Guinea

== See also ==
- Ma Wan (painter)
