= Astrolabe Company =

German "colonial society" in Kaiser-Wilhelmsland

The Astrolabe Company (German: Astrolabe-Compagnie) was a German "colonial society" (Kolonialgesellschaft) in Kaiser-Wilhelmsland, which existed from 1891 to 1896. On 27 October 1891 it was founded with a capital of 2.4 million marks. Involved were Hamburg and Bremen notables and the financiers.

The director of the company was the Geheimer Kommerzienrat (councillor) Adolph von Hansemann. He also headed the New Guinea Company, from which the company first took over some tobacco plantations in Stephansort and Erima. The following year, an additional tobacco plantation was founded in Jomba, and another in 1893 in Maraga. In that year, 108,600 pounds of tobacco was exported to Europe. In addition to the tobacco growing and export, Astrolabe also shipped exotic woods and experimented with the cultivation of coconut palms, Liberian coffee and natural rubber. In 1896, the company ran tobacco and coffee plantations in Stephansort and tobacco plantations in Erima, Jomba, and Maraga.

After bad years in 1895 and 1896, the company merged again with the New Guinea Company in 1896.

In the vicinity of the Astrolabe Company stations, the evangelic Rhenish Missionary Society was also active.

== Sources ==
- Deutschland und seine Kolonien im Jahre 1896, Amtlicher Bericht über die erste deutsche Kolonial-Ausstellung. (Germany and its colonies in 1896, official report about the first German colonial exhibition.) Editor "Arbeitsausschuss der Deutschen Kolonial-Ausstellung", Berlin 1897, publisher Dietrich Reimer (Ernst Vohsen)
