= Hansemann Range =

Mountain range in Papua New Guinea

Hansemann Mountains
- Hansemann Mountains, German New Guinea, drawn by Otto Finsch.

Geography
- Location within Papua New Guinea
- State: Papua New Guinea
- Range coordinates: 5°13′0″S 145°48′0″E

Hansemann Mountains is a mountain range in Papua New Guinea. It was named after Adolph von Hansemann. Hansemann Mountains are located near town of Madang.

== See also ==
- Hansemann Range languages
