= Garus language =

Madang language spoken in Papua New Guinea

Garus
- Native to: Papua New Guinea
- Region: Madang Province
- Native speakers: 2,700 (2003)
- Language family: Trans–New Guinea: Madang; Croisilles linkage; Mabuso; Hanseman; Garus

Language codes
- ISO 639-3: gyb
- Glottolog: garu1246

Garus, or Ate (cf. neighboring and closely related Garuh, or Nobonob, and its dialect Ati), is a Papuan language of Papua New Guinea.
