= Mawan language =

Madang language of Papua New Guinea

Mawan
- Native to: Papua New Guinea
- Region: Madang Province
- Ethnicity: 480 (2000 census)
- Native speakers: (2001 cited 2001)
- Language family: Trans–New Guinea: Madang; Croisilles linkage; Mabuso; Hanseman; Mawan

Language codes
- ISO 639-3: mcz
- Glottolog: mawa1267
- ELP: Mawan

Mawan is a Madang language of Papua New Guinea now spoken only by older adults.
