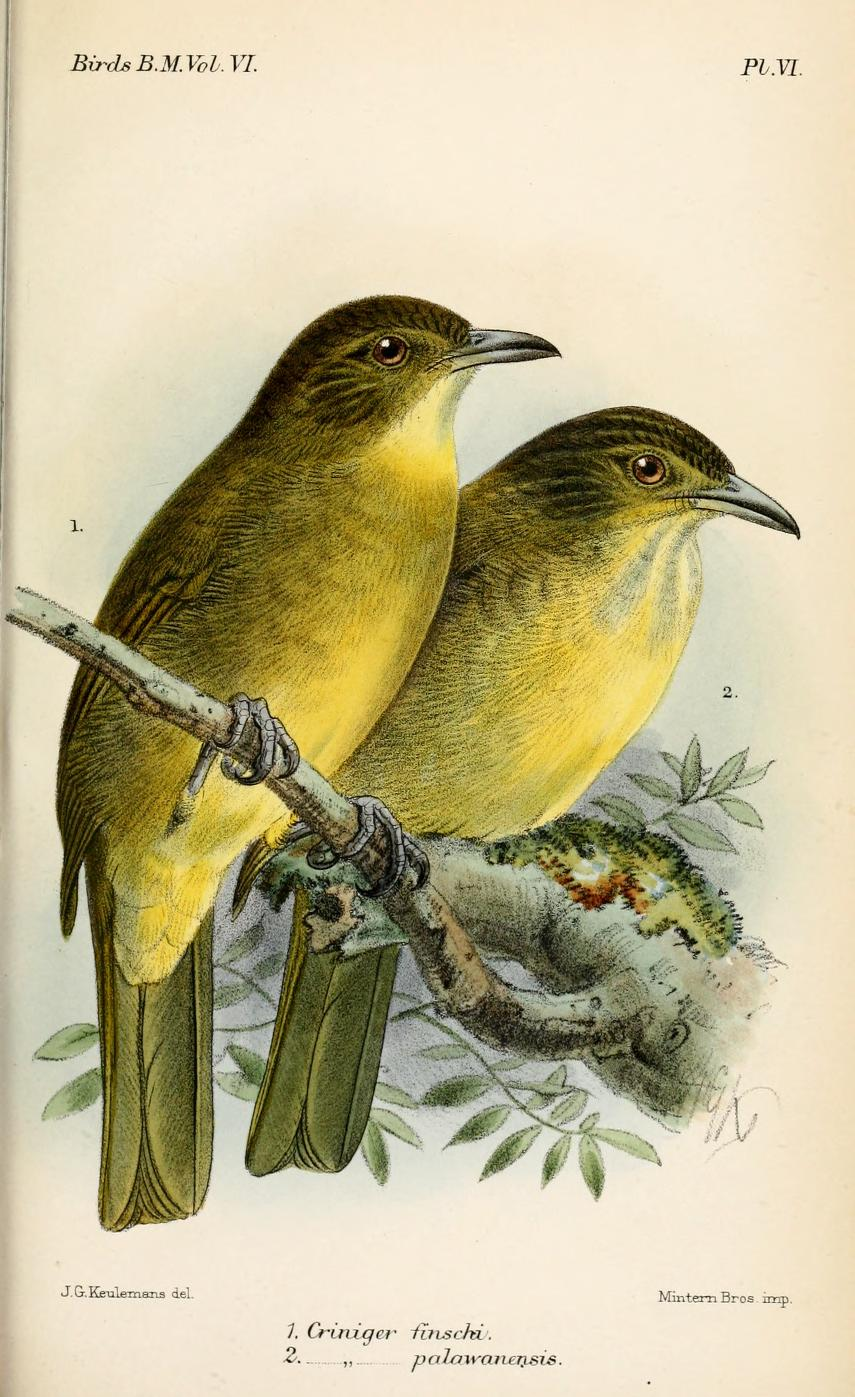
- Finsch's bulbul (left) by John Gerrard Keulemans
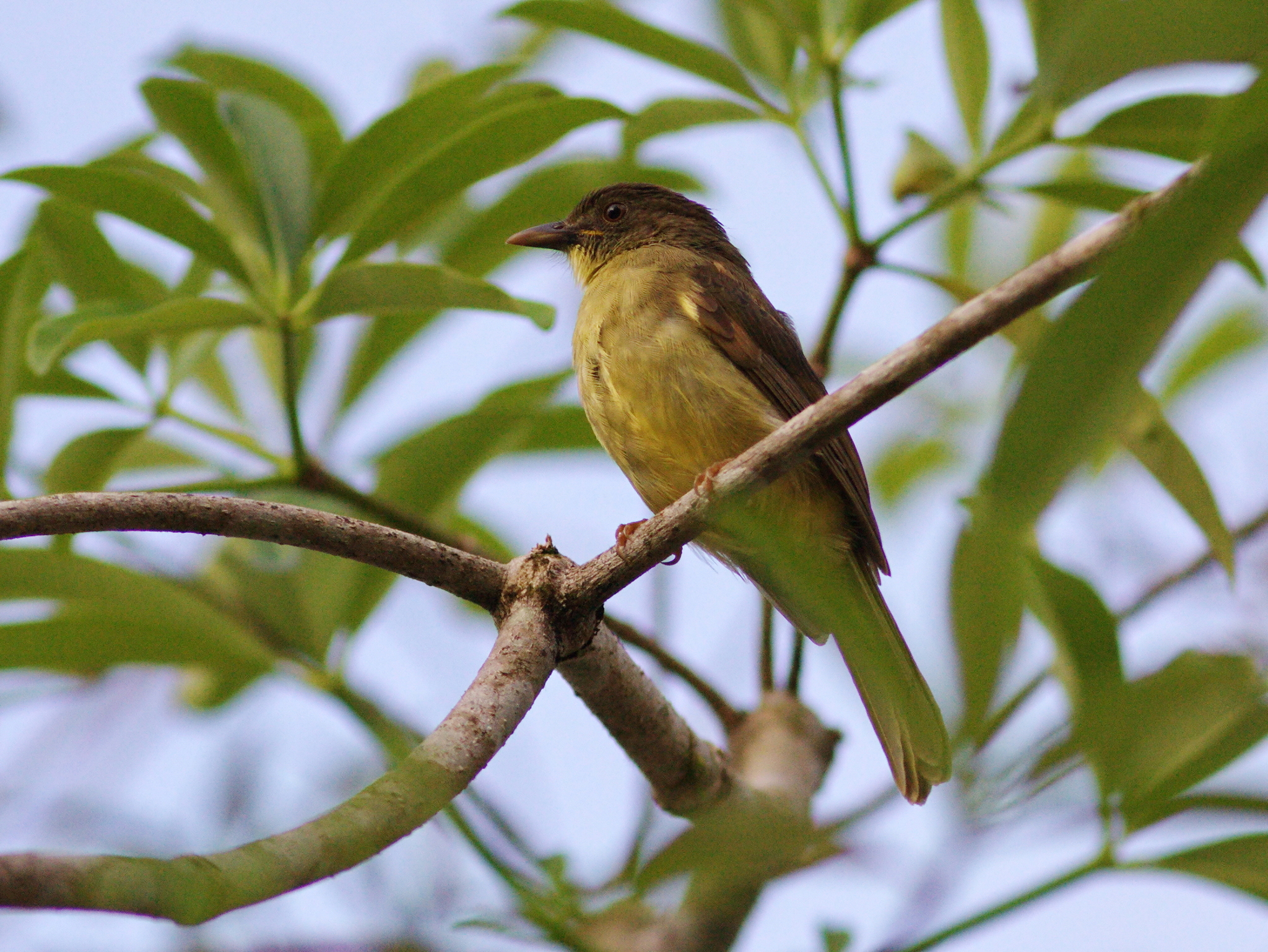

Conservation status
- Near Threatened (IUCN 3.1)

Scientific classification
- Kingdom: Animalia
- Phylum: Chordata
- Class: Aves
- Order: Passeriformes
- Family: Pycnonotidae
- Genus: Iole
- Species: I. finschii

Binomial name
- Iole finschii (Salvadori, 1871)
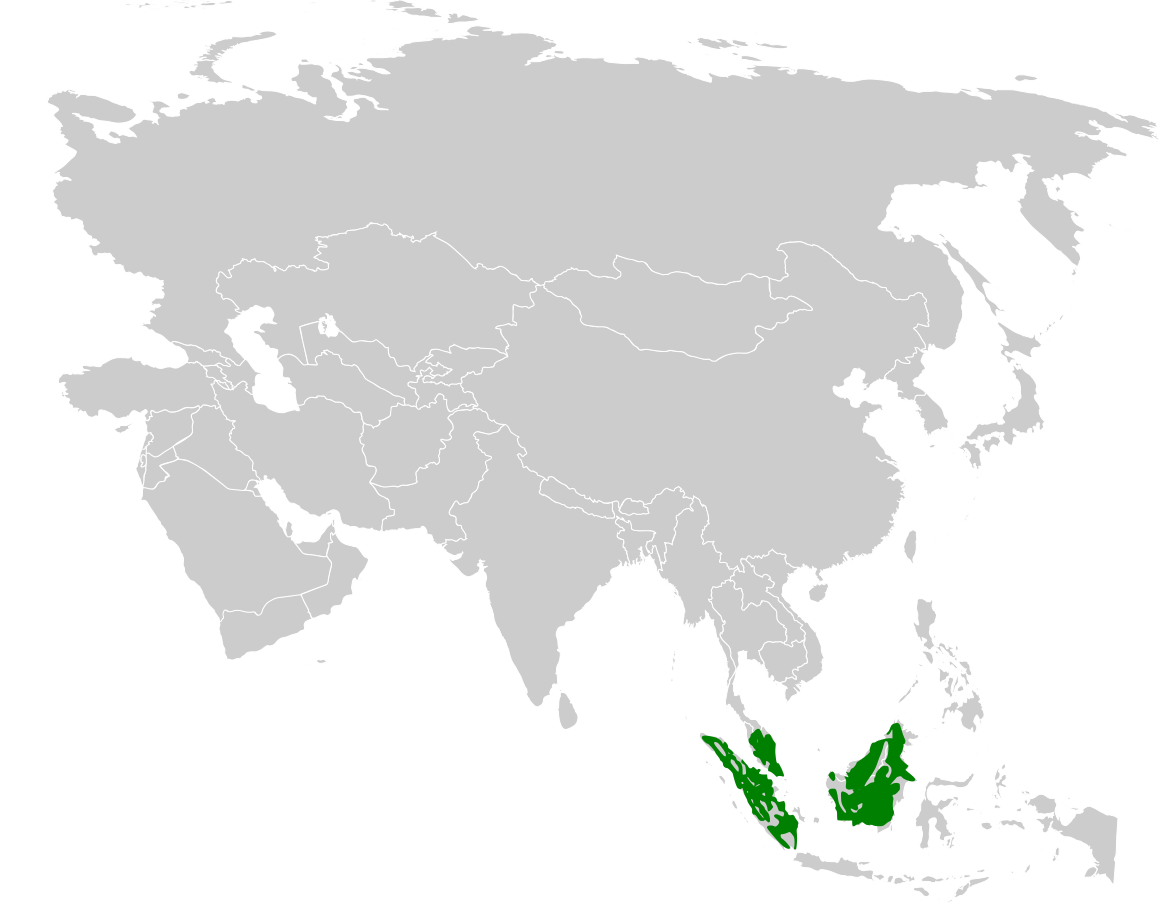

Synonyms
- Alophoixus finschii; Criniger finschi

= Finsch's bulbul =

Species of songbird

Finsch's bulbul (Iole finschii) is a species of songbird in the bulbul family, Pycnonotidae. It is found on the Malay Peninsula, Sumatra, and Borneo. Its natural habitat is subtropical or tropical moist lowland forests. It is threatened by habitat loss.

== Taxonomy and systematics ==
Finsch's bulbul was originally described in the genus Criniger, moved to the genus Alophoixus in 2009, and to genus Iole in 2020. Alternate names for Finsch's bulbul include the dwarf bearded bulbul, dwarf bulbul and Finsch's bearded bulbul. The common name and scientific name commemorate the German ethnographer, naturalist and colonial explorer Friedrich Hermann Otto Finsch.
