= Hanseman languages =

Hanseman
- Hansemann Range
- Geographic distribution: Hansemann Range, Madang, Papua New Guinea
- Linguistic classification: Madang: Central Madang; Mabuso; Hanseman

Language codes
- ISO 639-3: –
- Glottolog: hans1243

The Hanseman languages are a group of relatively closely related languages in New Guinea, spoken in the Hansemann Range of mountains. "Closely related" is relative to the situation in New Guinea. Ethnologue notes that Wagi, for example, may be most closely related to Nobonob, yet they are only 30% lexically similar.

The languages are:

- Kare
- East Hansemann: Nobonob (Garuh), Wagi (Kamba)
- Central Hansemann: Bagupi–Nake, Saruga
- North Hansemann: Garus–Rapting, Rempi–Yoidik
- Northwest Hansemann: Mosimo–Wamas, Samosa (incl. Murupi)
- Southwest Hansemann
  - North Gogol River: Matepi, Utu–Silopi
  - South Gogol River: Baimak, Gal, Mawan
