= Rapting language =

Madang language of Papua New Guinea

Rapting
- Native to: Papua New Guinea
- Region: Madang Province
- Native speakers: (330 cited 1981)
- Language family: Trans–New Guinea: Madang; Croisilles linkage; Mabuso; Hanseman; Rapting

Language codes
- ISO 639-3: rpt
- Glottolog: rapt1240

Rapting is a Madang language of Papua New Guinea.
