= Nobonob language =

Mabuso language spoken in Papua New Guinea

Nobonob
- Garuh
- Native to: Papua New Guinea
- Region: Madang Province
- Native speakers: 5,000 (2005 census)
- Language family: Trans–New Guinea: Madang; Croisilles linkage; Mabuso; Hanseman; Nobonob

Language codes
- ISO 639-3: gaw
- Glottolog: nobo1238

Nobonob (Nobanob, Nobnob), also known as Butelkud-Guntabak or Garuh (cf. closely related Garus), is a Papuan language of Papua New Guinea. The language is expanding slightly. Ari (Ati, A’i) is a dialect.

== Phonology ==
=== Vowels (orthographic) ===
| | Front | Central | Back |
|---|---|---|---|
| Close | i ii | | u uu |
| Mid | e ee | | o oo |
| Open | | a aa | |

=== Consonants (orthographic) ===
| | Bilabial | Alveolar | Palatal | Velar | Glottal |
|---|---|---|---|---|---|
| Voiceless stop | p p̱ | t ṯ | | k ḵ | |
| Voiced stop/implosive | b q | d ḏ | | g g̱ | |
| Nasal | m | n | | | |
| Fricative | | (s) | | | h |
| Approximant | w | l | y | | |
