= Finsch (crater) =

Crater on the Moon

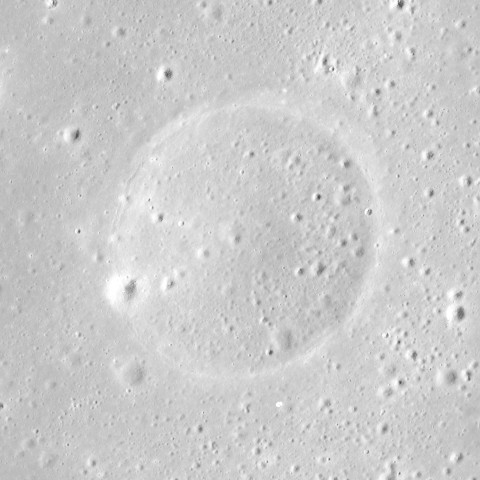
- Apollo 15 image
- Coordinates: 23.6°N 21.3°E
- Diameter: 4.05 km (2.52 mi)
- Depth: None
- Colongitude: 339° at sunrise
- Eponym: Otto Finsch

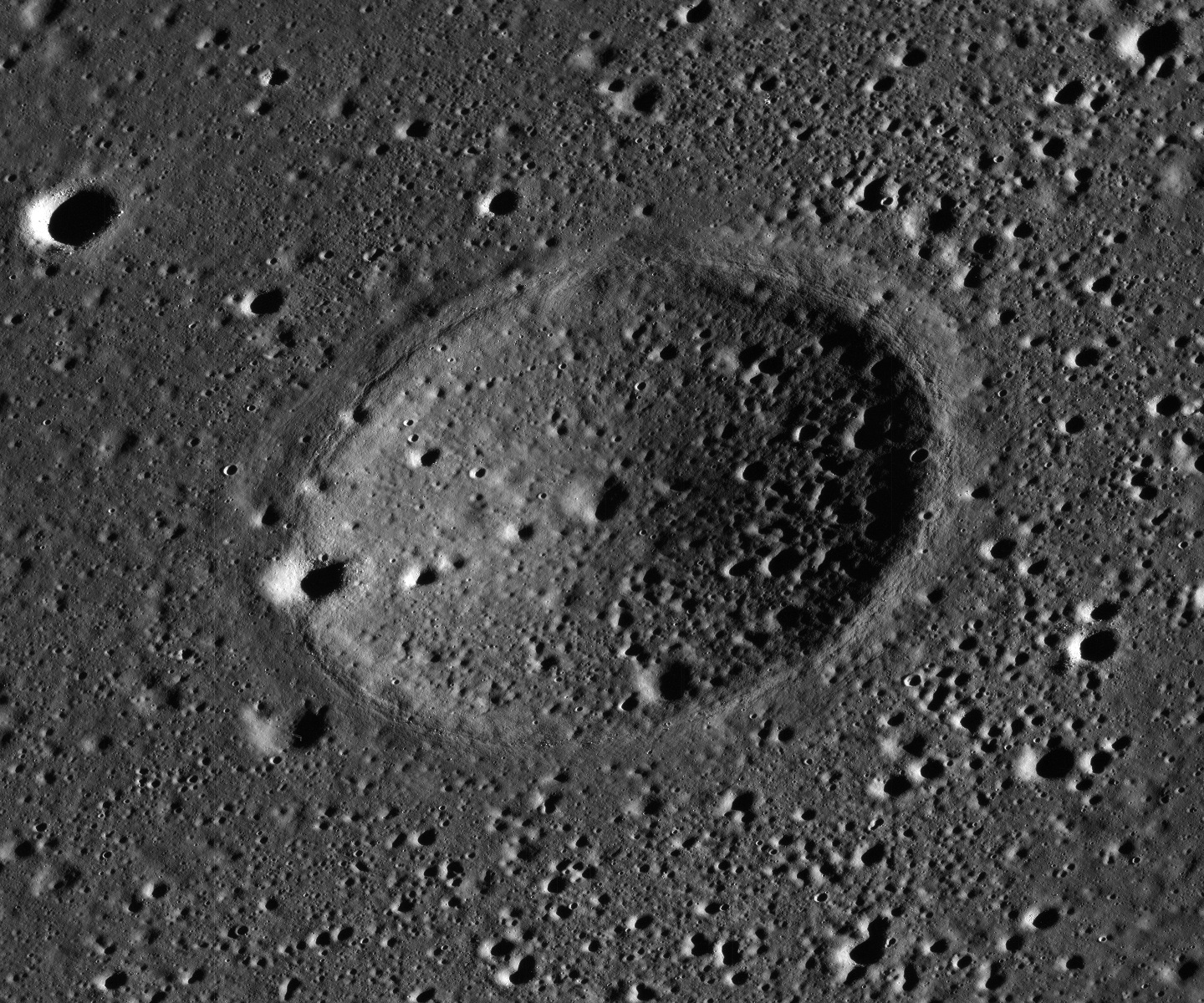
Oblique view of Finsch from Apollo 17

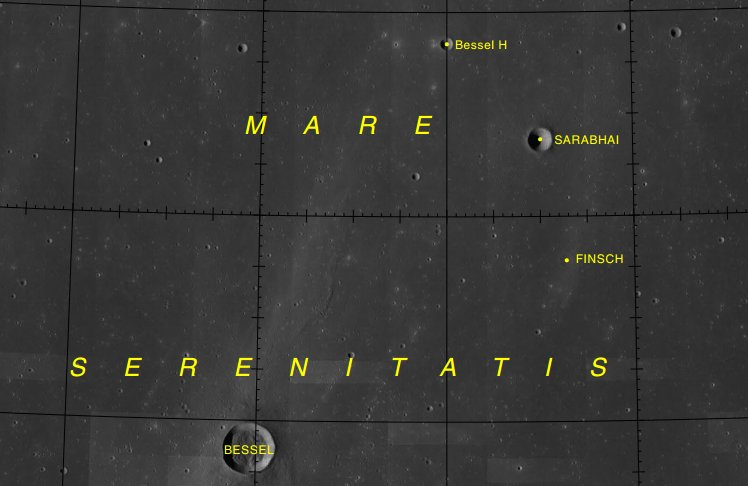
Location of Finsch crater in Mare Serenitatis

Finsch is a relatively small lunar impact crater in the mid-part of the Mare Serenitatis. It is located to the south-southeast of the crater Sarabhai and northeast of Bessel. Apart from the crest of the rim, this formation has been completely submerged by basaltic mare deposits, forming a ghost crater in the lava plain.

This formation is named after German zoologist Friedrich Hermann Otto Finsch (1839-1917). Its designation was officially adopted by the International Astronomical Union in 1976.

== Sources ==
- Rükl, Antonín (1990). Atlas of the Moon. Kalmbach Books. ISBN 978-0-913135-17-4.
- Wlasuk, Peter T. (2000). Observing the Moon. Springer. ISBN 978-1-85233-193-1.
