= Gumalu language =

Papuan language of Papua New Guinea

Gumalu
- Native to: Papua New Guinea
- Region: Madang Province
- Native speakers: 580 (2003)
- Language family: Trans–New Guinea: Madang; Croisilles linkage; Mabuso?; Gum; Gumalu

Language codes
- ISO 639-3: gmu
- Glottolog: guma1255

Gumalu is a Papuan language of Papua New Guinea.
