= Gum languages =

Gum
- Geographic distribution: New Guinea
- Linguistic classification: Madang: Central Madang; Mabuso; South Mabuso; Munit–Gum; Gum

Language codes
- ISO 639-3: –
- Glottolog: gumm1240

The Gum languages are a small group of closely related languages in New Guinea.

The languages are:

- Amele
- Central Gum: Bau, Gumalu, Sihan
- North Gum: Isebe, Panim
