= Kein language =

Papuan language of Papua New Guinea

Kein
- Bemal
- Native to: Papua New Guinea
- Region: Madang Province
- Native speakers: (1,800 cited 2000 census)
- Language family: Trans–New Guinea: Madang; Croisilles linkage; Mabuso?; Kokon; Kein

Language codes
- ISO 639-3: bmh
- Glottolog: kein1239

Kein, also known as Bemal, is a Papuan language of Papua New Guinea.
