= Murupi language =

Madang language of Papua New Guinea

Murupi
- Native to: Papua New Guinea
- Region: Madang Province
- Native speakers: (300 cited 1981)
- Language family: Trans–New Guinea: Madang; Croisilles linkage; Mabuso; Hanseman; Murupi

Language codes
- ISO 639-3: mqw
- Glottolog: muru1273

Murupi is a Madang language of Papua New Guinea.
