= Girawa language =

Papuan language of Papua New Guinea

Girawa
- Bagasin
- Region: Papua New Guinea
- Native speakers: (3,600 cited 2000)
- Language family: Trans–New Guinea: Madang; Croisilles linkage; Mabuso?; Kokon; Girawa

Language codes
- ISO 639-3: bbr
- Glottolog: gira1247

Girawa, also known as Bagasin (Begasin, Begesin), is a Papuan language of Papua New Guinea.
