= Munit language =

Papuan language of Papua New Guinea

Munit
- Native to: Papua New Guinea
- Region: Madang Province
- Native speakers: 910 (2003)
- Language family: Trans–New Guinea: Madang; Croisilles; Mabuso?; Kokon; Munit

Language codes
- ISO 639-3: mtc
- Glottolog: muni1257

Munit is a Papuan language of Papua New Guinea.
