= Otto Finsch =

German ethnographer, naturalist and colonial explorer

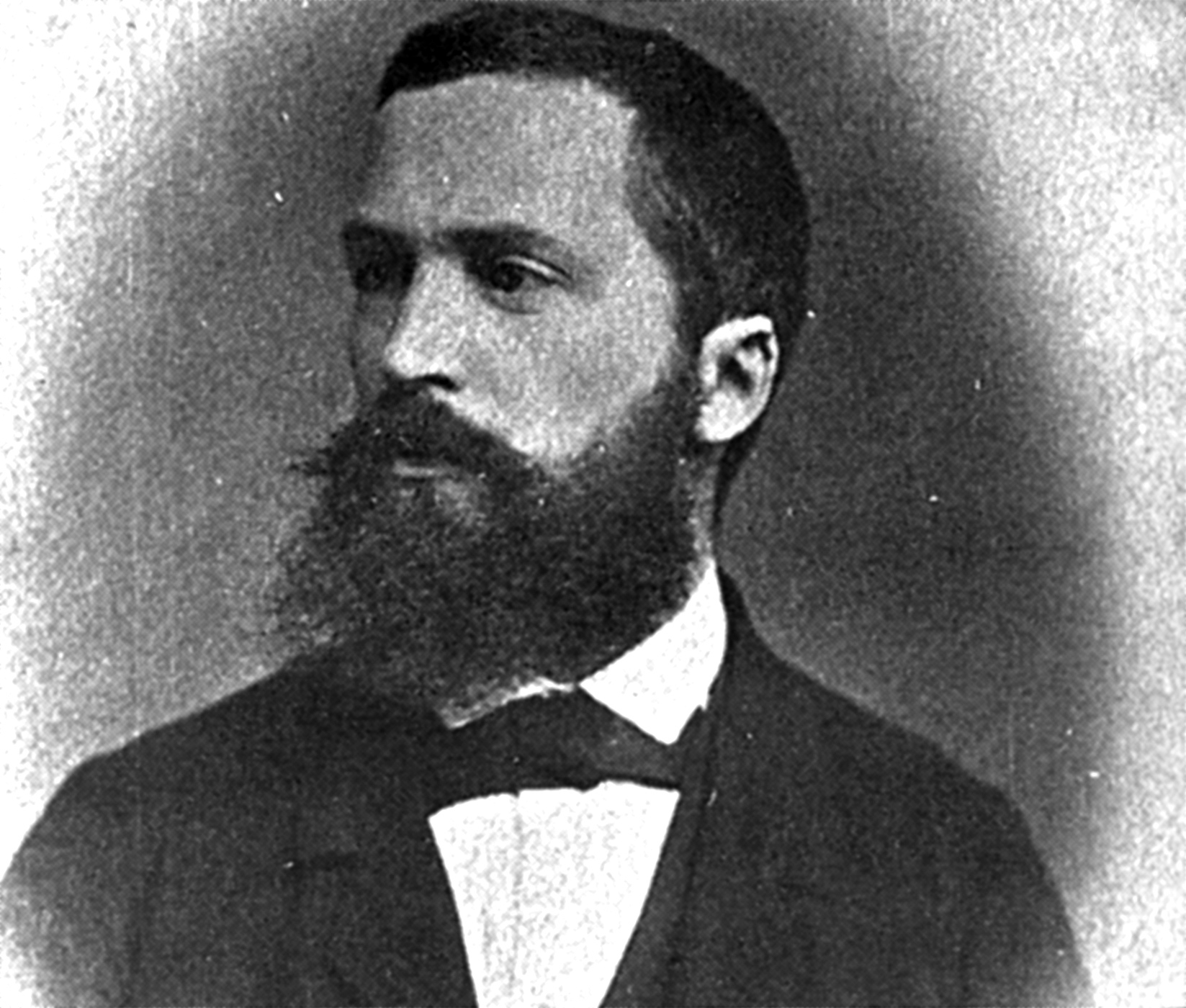
- Born: Friedrich Hermann Otto Finsch; 8 August 1839; Bad Warmbrunn, Silesia, now Cieplice Śląskie-Zdrój, Poland
- Died: 31 January 1917 (aged 77); Braunschweig, Germany
- Education: Royal Hungarian University, Budapest
- Known for: Research on parrots
- Spouses: Josephine Wychodil (divorced), Elisabeth Hoffman
- Scientific career
- Workplaces: Rijksmuseum van Natuurlijke Historie, Leiden, The Netherlands
- Author abbrev. (zoology): Finsch

Friedrich Hermann Otto Finsch (8 August 1839, Warmbrunn – 31 January 1917, Braunschweig) was a German ethnographer, naturalist and colonial explorer. He is known for a two-volume monograph on the parrots of the world which earned him a doctorate. He also wrote on the people of New Guinea and was involved in plans for German colonization in Southeast Asia. Several species of bird (such as Oenanthe finschii, Iole finschii, Psittacula finschii) are named after him as also the town of Finschhafen in Morobe Province, Papua New Guinea and a crater on the Moon.

== Biography ==
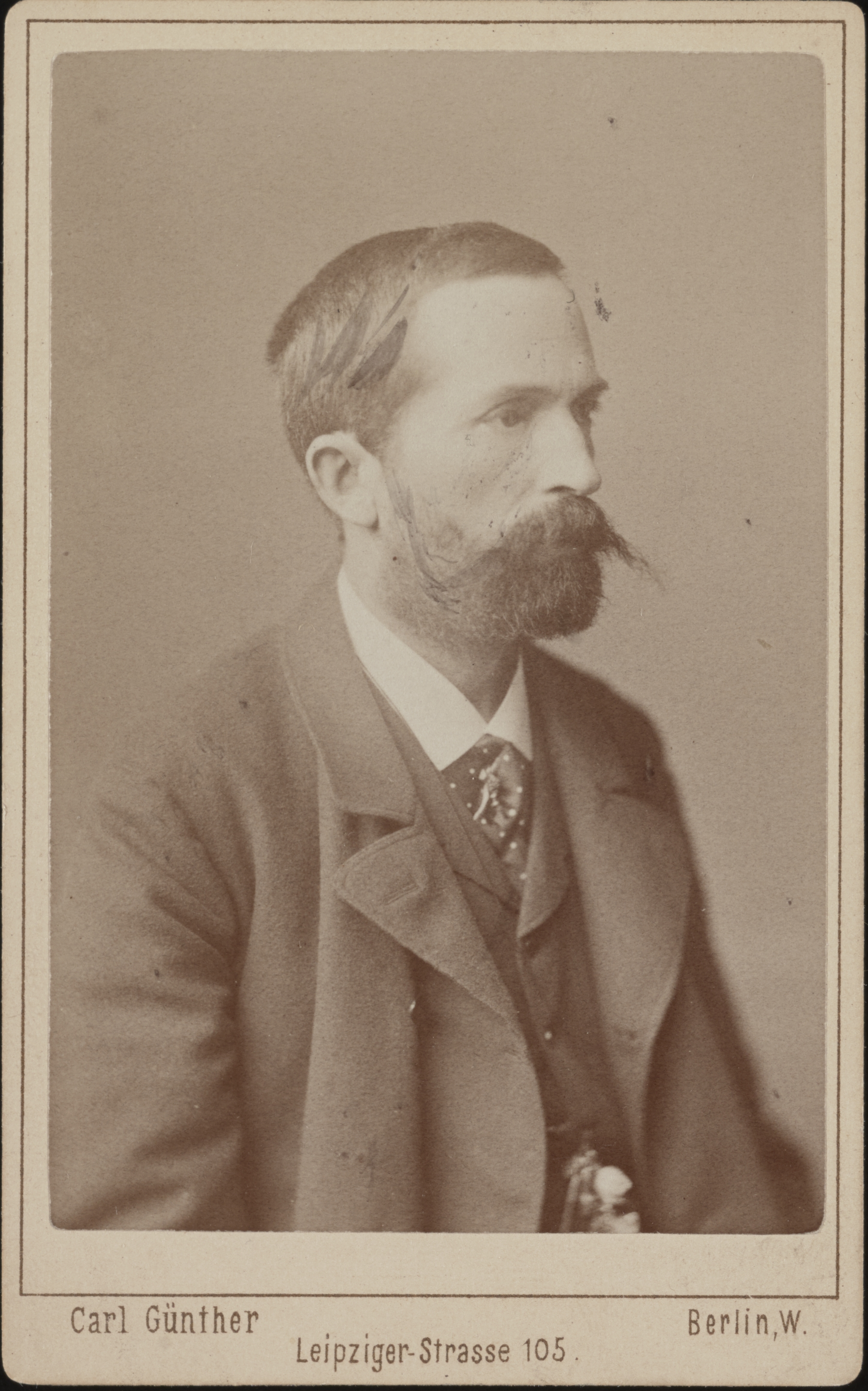
Carte-de-visite, 1882

Finsch was born at Bad Warmbrunn in Silesia to Mortiz Finsch and Mathilde Leder. His father was in the glass trade and he too trained as a glass painter. An interest in birds led him to use his artistic skills for the purpose. Finsch went to Budapest in 1857 and studied at the Royal Hungarian University, earning money by preparing natural history specimens. He then spent two years in Russe, Bulgaria on an invitation from the Austrian Consul and gave private tutoring in German while exploring the birdlife of the region. He published his first paper in the Journal fur Ornithologie on the birds of Bulgaria. This experience helped him obtain a curatorial position at the Rijksmuseum van Natuurlijke Historie in Leiden (1862–1865) assisting Herman Schlegel.

In 1864 he returned to Germany on the suggestion of Gustav Hartlaub to become curator of the museum in Bremen and became its director in 1876. After publishing the two volume monographs on the parrots of the world, Die Papageien, monographisch bearbeitet (1867–68), he obtained an honorary doctorate from the Friedrich Wilhelms University in Bonn. Apart from ornithology he also took an interest in ethnology. In 1876 he accompanied the zoologist Alfred Brehm on an expedition to Turkestan and northwest China.

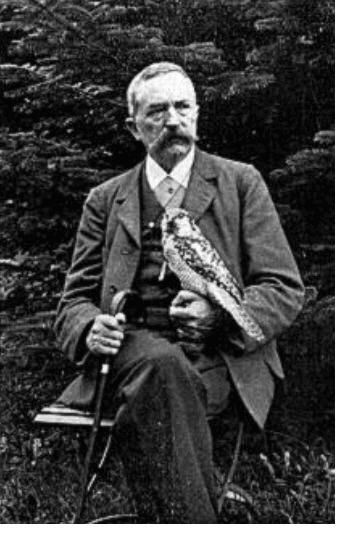

Finsch resigned as curator of the museum in 1878 in order that he could resume his travels, sponsored by the Humboldt Foundation. Between spring 1879 and 1885 he made several visits to the Polynesian Islands, New Zealand, Australia and New Guinea. His proposal was to obtain as many artefacts as possible with the claim that native cultures, fauna and flora were fast vanishing. Finsch was shocked by the punitive actions of the English Methodist missionary George Brown (1835–1917) and was concerned by the violent conflicts between the natives and westerners. He also found no support for contemporary ideas on race with neat categories and found instead a continuum of variations in the human form. After witnessing a cannibal feast at Matupit he commented that the people were still not classifiable as "savages" as they maintained neat agriculture, had their own song, dance and followed commerce.

He returned to Germany in 1882 and began to promote the creation of German colonies in the Pacific along with the South Sea Plotters, an influential group led by a banker Adolph von Hansemann. In 1884 he returned aboard the steamer Samoa to New Guinea as Bismarck's Imperial Commissioner to explore potential harbours under the guise of scientists and negotiated for the north-eastern portion of that island, together with New Britain and New Ireland, to become a German protectorate. It was renamed Kaiser-Wilhelmsland and the Bismarck Archipelago. The capital of the colony was named Finschhafen in his honour. In 1885 he was the first European to discover the Sepik river, and he named it after Kaiserin Augusta, the German Empress. Newspapers of the period speculated that he would be appointed as an administrator to the new territories but this never happened. He was instead offered a position as station director which involved menial administrative tasks that would come in the way of his plans to explore and study the region.

He returned to Germany and spent much of the subsequent period without formal employment. Finsch had been married to Josephine Wychodil from around 1873 but they divorced around 1880. In 1886 he married Elisabeth Hoffman (1860–1925). Elisabeth was a talented artist and she illustrated many of his catalogues. Finsch was briefly an advisor to the Neuguinea-Kompagnie. In 1898 he abandoned his dreams in ethnology and returned to ornithology, becoming curator of the bird collections at the Rijksmuseum in Leiden. He did not enjoy this period, noting that life for him, his wife and daughter Esther, felt like living in exile. He also wrote several articles on his past work Wie ich Kaiser-Wilhelmsland erwarb (How I acquired Kaiser Wilhelm’s Land, 1902) and Kaiser-Wilhelmsland. Eine friedliche Kolonialerwerbung (Kaiser Wilhelm’s Land: A peaceful colonial acquisition, 1905). Seeking return to Germany, he finally joined the ethnographical department of the Municipal Museum in Brunswick in 1904 and worked the remainder of his life there. In 1909 he was titled professor by the Duke of Braunschweig and honoured with a 'medal for distinguished services for art and science' in silver.

One of his major works was on the parrots of the world. This was not without its critics, since he often tried to rename genera apparently to gain taxonomic authorship.

Several species of birds bear his name, including the lilac-crowned parrot (Amazona finschi), Finsch's wheatear (Oenanthe finschii), Finsch's bulbul (Iole finschii), and the grey-headed parakeet (Psittacula finschii). A species of monitor lizard, Varanus finschi, is named after him, because he collected what would become the holotype for this species. The crater Finsch on the Moon is also named in his honor.

In 2008, following international treaties, some of the human remains that he had collected from Cape York and the Torres Straits that were held in the Charité Medical University in Berlin were repatriated. Additional remains have also been repatriated.

== Published works ==
- Catalog der Ausstellung ethnographischer und naturwissenschaftlicher Sammlungen (Bremen: Diercksen und Wichlein, 1877).
- Anthropologische Ergebnisse einer Reise in der Südsee und dem malayischen Archipel in den Jahren 1879–1882 (Berlin: A. Asher & Co., 1884).
- Otto Finsch, Masks of Faces of Races of Men from the South Sea Islands and the Malay Archipelago, taken from Living Originals in the Years 1879–82 (Rochester, NY: Ward's Natural Sciences Establishment, 1888).
- Ethnologische Erfahrungen und Belegstücke aus der Südsee: Beschreibender Katalog einer Sammlung im K.K. naturhistorischen Hofmuseum in Wien (Wien: A. Holder, 1893).
- Die Papageien / monographisch bearbeitet von Otto Finsch Leiden: Brill, 1867–68.
- with Gustav Hartlaub, "Die Vögel der Palau-Gruppe. Über neue und weniger gekannte Vögel von den Viti-, Samoa- und Carolinen-Inseln." Journal des Museum Godeffroy, Heft 8, 1875 and Heft 12, 1876.

== Other sources ==
- Herbert Abel, Otto Finsch: Ein Lebensbild Zur 50. Wiederkehr des Todestages am 31. Januar 1967. Jahrbuch der Schlesischen Friedrich-Wilhelms-Universität zu Breslau. Band XII. Wuerzburg: Holzner-Verlag.
- Howes, Hilary, 2018. « A “Perceptive Observer” in the Pacific: Life and Work of Otto Finsch » in Bérose - Encyclopédie internationale des histoires de l’anthropologie
