= David Hansemann =

German politician

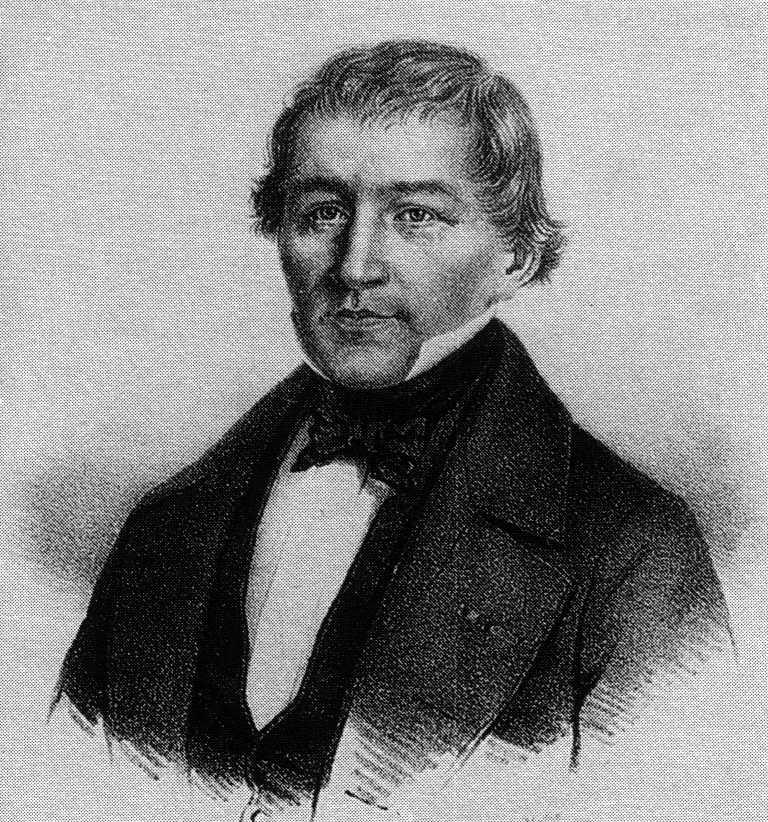
- Hansemann in 1848
- Born: 12 July 1790; Hamburg, Kingdom of Prussia
- Died: 4 August 1864 (aged 74)
- Occupations: Politician, banker

David Justus Ludwig Hansemann (12 July 1790 – 4 August 1864) was a Prussian politician and banker, serving as the Prussian Minister of Finance in 1848.

== Life ==
Hansemann was born in Finkenwerder, Hamburg, the son of a Protestant minister. After studying commerce, he was a representative for a Monschau cloth manufacturer. From 1817, he created different enterprises in Aachen, under which the predecessor company the Aachen native of Munich, which is today part of the AMB Generali. Into the 1820s and 1830s, he came by a large sum of money. His concern for the well-being of his employees and his readiness for generous donations were considered unusual. In 1821 he married Fanny Fremery, who came from a French Huguenot family.

David Hansemann engaged himself for the building of railways in the Rhine Province. He wrote several memoranda about railway. The moreover one he was shareholder of the Rhenish Railway Company (German: Rheinische Eisenbahn-Gesellschaft, RhE). In accordance with a royal cabinet order of February 1837, he became vice-president of the RhE. He was considerably involved in the establishment of further railway companies, including the Cologne-Minden Railway Company and the Bergisch-Märkische Railway Company.

During the 1830s, Hansemann became increasingly involved in politics, and in 1843, he became a member of the provincial parliament (Provinziallandtag) for Rhenish Prussia. In the year 1847, he became a member of the Prussian United Parliament (Vereinigter Landtag). Hansemann was considered as one of the prominent heads of German Liberalism. Within liberalism, he, along with the later president of the Frankfurt Parliament, Heinrich von Gagern, belonged to the so-called "half ones", i.e. ready to compromise.

During the short-lived Prussian March Ministry under Gottfried Ludolf Camphausen, Hansemann was made Minister of Finance. He retained this post in the next administration led by Rudolf von Auerswald, until his resignation on 8 September 1848.

For the noble elite of Prussia, Hansemann was considered far too liberal; his subtly critical book Prussia and France of 1833 and different memoranda from the 1840s lead him to be thought of as a dangerous radical. On the other hand, he was considered by radicals to be a reactionary serving the elite: Karl Marx scornfully called him a "liberal lick-spittle."

This double resistance, a principal reason for the defeat of the liberalism after the March revolution in Germany, finally led to Hansemann leaving politics. After leaving political life, Hansemann returned to commerce, and in 1851 he formed the Disconto-Gesellschaft, which merged with Deutsche Bank in 1929.

Hansemann died in Schlangenbad, during a cure stay in the Taunus. He is buried in the Hansemann mausoleum at the Matthaeus Kirchhof in the Schöneberg district of Berlin. His son Adolph von Hansemann became one of the richest and most important entrepreneurs of the German Reich, although in contrast to his father, he was not a liberal.

== Commemoration ==
From 30 March 1933 until 1945 he appeared on the 50 ℛ︁ℳ︁ note issued by the Reichsbank. Printing ceased in 1945, although the note remained in circulation until the issue of the Deutsche Mark on 21 June 1948.

== Quotations ==
(1847) before the Prussian united federal state parliament became famous: * "in financial matters the cosiness stops."

From a memorandum of 1840: * "many governing or interfering the public administration into too many articles became rule. They have the official itself the inclination unconsciously hang-give to decide or estimate rather after cheapness the most various articles, which will leave fueglich to the discretion of the private people and Korporationen could, in own opinion." * "so everyone is in principle unfreely and politically minor, and the large majority does not carry by any means an active for demand for formally secured [... ] this kind of satisfaction of the people pleases some official splendid and as proof is stated, like the Prussian conditions the safest and most satisfying in Europe nevertheless would be."

From a letter from 1839: * "with the conviction that, if I dedicated time and mental effort completely the business my fortune would amount to probably now the double, I work much in general affairs. I judge fortunes only as means, not purpose. This means brings independence, to calming for the life span and the ability to give and in addition useful expenditures to make be able to the children a good education."

== See also ==
- A. Schaaffhausen'scher Bankverein
