= Ferdinand von Hansemann =

Prussian landlord and politician

Ferdinand von Hansemann (10 September 1861 – 3 October 1900) was a Prussian landlord and politician, co-founder of the German Eastern Marches Society.

== Life ==
Hansemann was born in Berlin to Adolf von Hansemann, a notable Prussian industrialist and manager of the Disconto-Gesellschaft, a large financial holding. Since early youth Hansemann was a member of various German nationalist organizations. As an owner of a large estate of Pempowo (Pępowo) in the Province of Posen, he was interested in Polish affairs. Thanks to his father's connections, in 1894 he entered in contact with Otto von Bismarck, who supported the creation of a new, all-German nationalist organization that would unite all Germans interested in strengthening the German spirit and property in Polish-inhabited areas.

As one of its founders, in 1894 Hansemann was elected to the board of the newly established German Eastern Marches Society, a post he held until his death. As one of the closest associates and supporters of Heinrich von Tiedemann, von Hansemann was active in other branches of the organization, notably holding the post of the editor in chief of the Die Ostmark monthly.
