= Adolph von Hansemann =

Imperial German businessman and banker

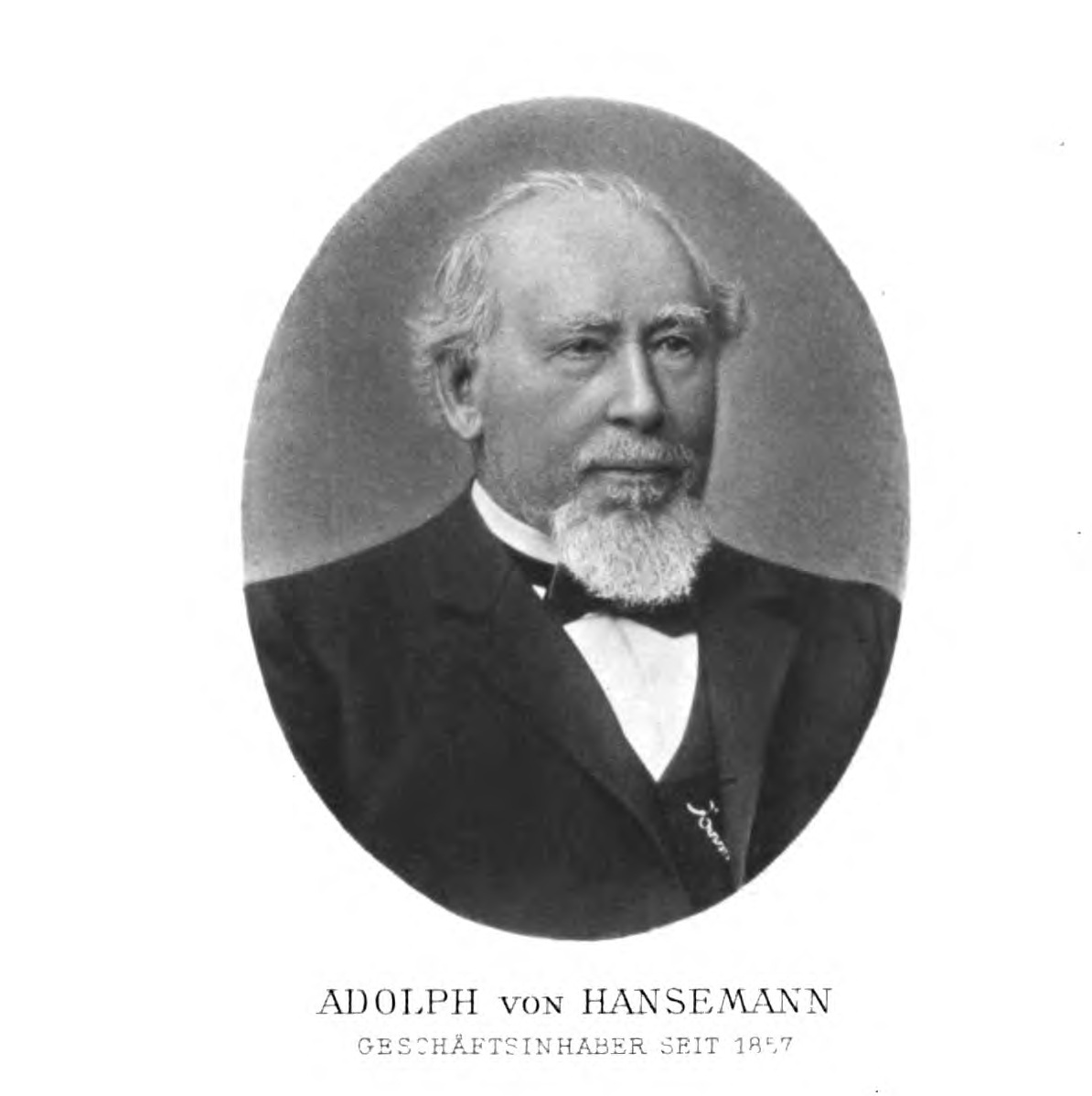
- Born: 27 July 1826
- Died: 9 December 1903 (aged 77)

Adolph von Hansemann (27 July 1826 – 9 December 1903) was an Imperial German businessman and banker.

== Life ==
Born in Aachen in 1826 to German banker and railroad entrepreneur David Hansemann, Adolph Hansemann developed an early interest in business administration. He left home for Hamburg in 1841. He was a partner in his brother Gustav's textile factory in Eupen, Belgium, until leaving to help manage his father's Disconto-Gesellschaft in 1857.

After his father's death in 1864, Adolph Hansemann continued to develop it by himself, expanding it into the largest private bank in the German Empire and one of the most famous in Europe. Along with Gerson von Bleichroeder, he arranged the financing for the Royal Prussian Army during the 1870 Franco-Prussian War; for his services, he was elevated to the peerage by Kaiser Wilhelm I and appended the von to his name.

As a board member at Krupp and chairman of the Gelsenkirchen Mining Company (Gelsenkirchener Bergwerks-AG), he participated in the growth of coal and steel industries in the Ruhr valley. Like his father, he was also involved with the German railroads, including the Lehrte line, as well as lines in Venezuela and Romania. Taking advantage of Bethel Strousberg's exposure there, Hansemann's greatest coup was working with Bleichroeder to purchase Strousberg's railways throughout Germany at a fraction of their real value.

He was an advocate of Germany's imperial expansion. He funded Johann Cesar VI. Godeffroy's Sea Trade Society (Seehandels-Gesellschaft) plantations and with Wilhelm Solf worked towards the establishment of German Samoa.

Hansemann Mountains, German New Guinea, drawn by Otto Finsch

In May 1884, Von Hansemann, and a syndicate of German bankers formed the New Guinea Consortium (Neuguinea-Konsortium, later Neuguinea-Kompanie) and Astrolabe Company (Astrolabe-Compagnie) which led to the establishment of Kaiser-Wilhelmsland and German New Guinea in the South Pacific.

This syndicate was created with the knowledge and blessing of the German chancellor, Count Otto von Bismarck, and with secrecy and speed an expedition was fitted out under Dr Otto Finsch, an ornithologist and explorer. His task was to select land for plantation development on the north-east coast of New Guinea and establish trading posts.

His Disconto Society funded the Central Line in German East Africa and the Shantung Railroad in the German concession of Kiaochau, China. Construction of his Otavi Railroad in German South-West Africa coincided with the Herero genocide there.

By this time Adolph von Hansemann was one of the richest men in the German Empire. Between 1887 and 1896, he modernized the Rügen resort of Sassnitz, the site of his castle Dwasieden, at his own expense. He also maintained a villa in Berlin and another at Lissa and purchased extensive tracts of land for his heirs.

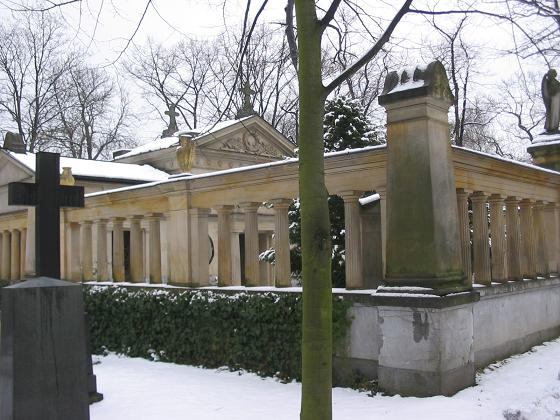
Von Hansemann family mausoleum

He married Ottilie von Kusserow (de:Ottilie von Hansemann), daughter of the Prussian Lt. Gen. Ferdinand von Kusserow, early advocate of women's rights, and sister of Heinrich von Kusserow (de:Heinrich von Kusserow), who became the first head of colonial affairs for the German Foreign Office. Adolph's children were Ferdinand and Davide Eveline von Hansemann. In October 1903, he died at work at his desk; according to his secretary, his last words were, "Well, tomorrow we work on."

== Sources ==
- Däbritz, Walther: David Hansemann und Adolph von Hansemann. Scherpe, Krefeld 1954. German.
- Kleeberg, John M. The Disconto-Gesellschaft and German Industrialization: a critical examination of the career of a German Universal Bank, 1851–1914. 1988. Accessed 9 September 2010.
- Lindemann, Ralf: Das weiße Schloss am Meer – Schloss Dwasieden in Sassnitz auf der Insel Rügen. Reprint Verlag Rügen, 2. Auflage, Bergen 2007. German.
- Mckillop, Bob & al. End of the Line: a History of Railways in Papua New Guinea. University of Papua New Guinea Press, 1997. Accessed 9 September 2010.
- Overlach, Theodore Wm. Foreign Financial Control in China. Ayer Publishing, 1976. Accessed 9 September 2010.
