= Disconto-Gesellschaft =

Former German bank

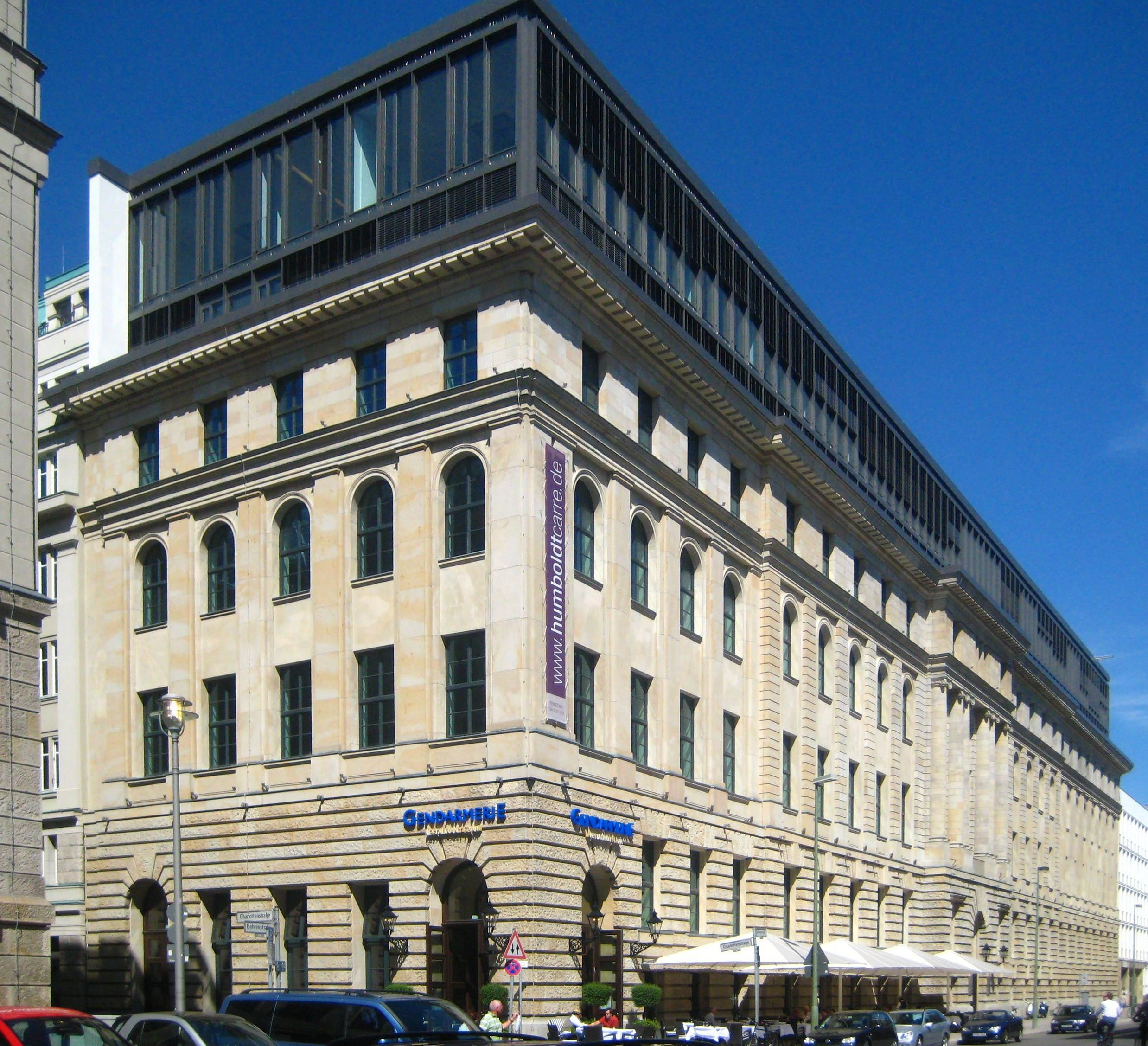
- Building at Behrensstrasse 43/44, Disconto-Gesellschaft head office in Berlin, as reconstructed in 1901 by architect Ludwig Heim with multiple alterations since then
- Industry: Financial services
- Founded: 1851; 175 years ago
- Founder: David Hansemann
- Headquarters: Berlin, Germany
- Area served: Germany
- Key people: Adolph von Hansemann

The Disconto-Gesellschaft (lit. 'Discount Company', full name Direktion der Disconto-Gesellschaft) was a significant German bank, founded in Berlin in 1851. It was one of the largest German banking organizations until its 1929 merger into Deutsche Bank.

== History ==
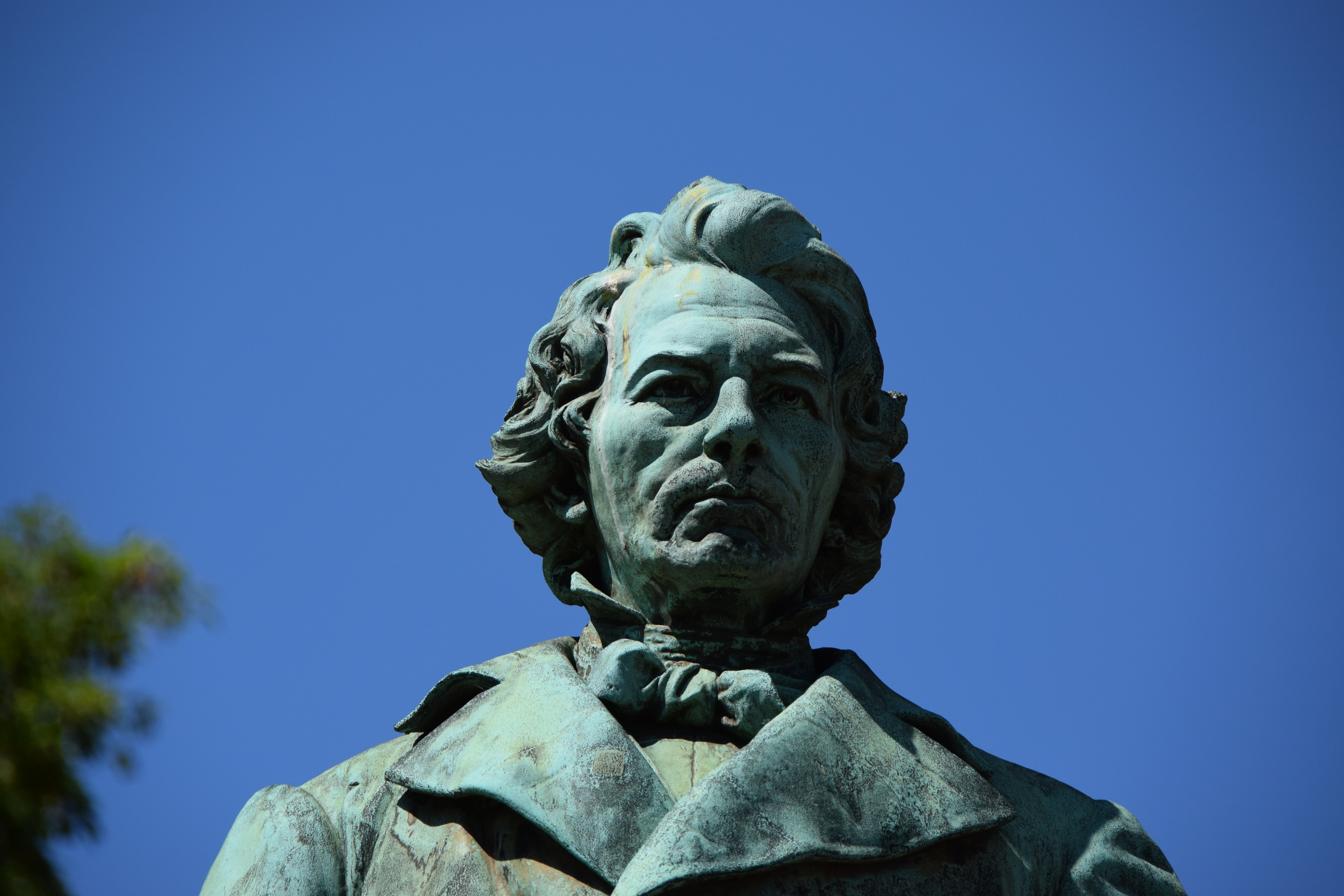
Statue of David Hansemann (1790-1864), founder of the Disconto-Gesellschaft, in Aachen

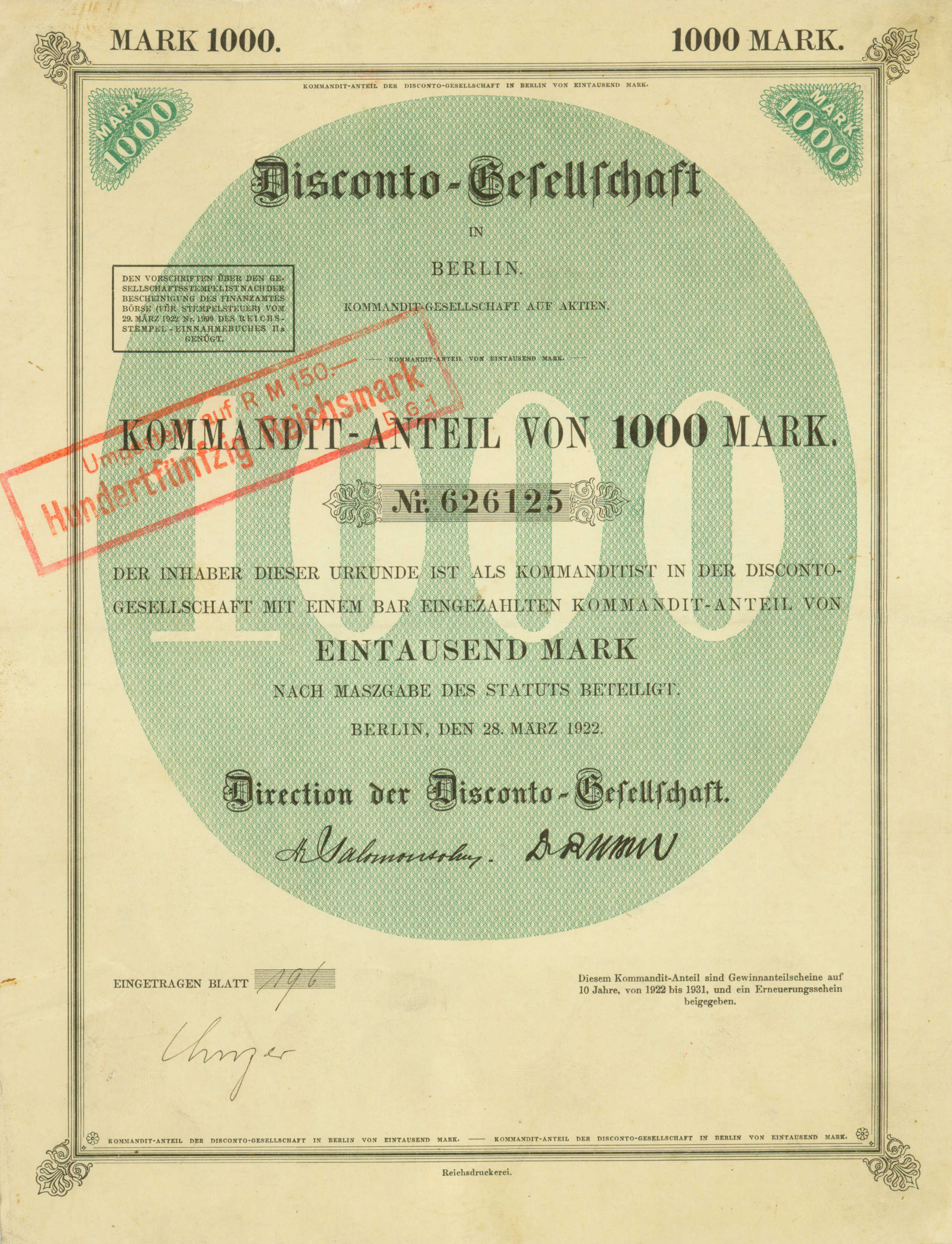
Limited partnership share of the Disconto-Gesellschaft, issued 28. March 1922

The Direktion der Disconto-Gesellschaft was established on 6 June 1851 at the initiative of David Hansemann, who had resigned two months later from his position as head of the Bank of Prussia. Hansemann established a Berlin Credit Partnership (German: Berliner Kreditgesellschaft), and converted it into a cooperative company form (German: Handelsgesellschaft) that did not require government authorization. Its initial business focus was lending to small businesses. It settled in a building on Kleine Präsidentenstrasse in the old center of Berlin, where it would remain until 1858.

On 9 January 1856, seeking increased financial firepower, Hansemann led the Disconto-Gesellschaft's conversion into a limited stock company in the form of Kommanditgesellschaft auf Aktien, exploiting a loophole in Prussian law that again allowed him to proceed without a government authorization. The successful subscription made the Disconto-Gesellschaft Prussia's largest private commercial bank in terms of capital. His son Adolph Hansemann started working at the bank in 1857 and would later lead its dynamic expansion until 1903.

In 1864, the Discont-Gesellschaft was the first to break the near-monopoly of the Austrian Rothschilds and Rothschild-controlled Creditanstalt on the financing of the Habsburg monarchy, paving the way for competition that was soon joined by the Darmstädter Bank (which had tentatively entered the parket in 1860), the Allgemeine Bodencreditanstalt (est. 1863), the Hungarian General Credit Bank (est. 1867), and the Wiener Bankverein (est. 1869).

In 1889, the Disconto-Gesellschaft participated in the creation of the Deutsch-Asiatische Bank in Shanghai, in 1897, of the Banca Generală Română in Bucharest, and in 1898, of the Banque Internationale de Bruxelles. In 1900 it established a branch in London, its first outside of Berlin. In 1901, on the liquidation of M. A. Rothschild & Söhne in Frankfurt, the Disconto-Gesellschaft also opened a branch there, emphasizing its strong connections with the Rothschild family.

The interests formed with this group made the Disconto-Gesellschaft a prominent factor in the underwriting of many important national and railway loans, notably the state loans of Russia, Romania, China and Japan. In addition, in connection with other interests, it was instrumental in the financing of the Kamerun Railroad Company and the Great Venezuela Railway, both speculative enterprises, and the latter eventually of great financial annoyance.

As a national factor, the Disconto-Gesellschaft lent its greatest support to industry through the promotion and financing of enterprises for the development of Germany's natural resources: the mining of coal and metals, smelting, iron and steel, potash, shipbuilding, electrical development, railways, fire and life insurance, etc. It assisted in the underwriting of the 10,000,000 thaler (30,000,000 marks) 5 per cent loan for the Krupp Works, in 1874 — the first instance in Germany of the issue of fractional form bonds secured by blanket mortgage and providing for common representation of the holders of these bonds.

Beginning in 1881, Disconto-Gesellschaft established or participated in the establishment of 15 important banking institutions, having 87 branches, scattered throughout Europe, Asia, South Pacific, South America and Africa; and through communities of interest, it had banking connections in Hamburg, Leipzig, Bremen, Mannheim and Geestmunde, these latter having 51 branches and numerous other agencies throughout the German Empire. In 1914 it absorbed the A. Schaaffhausen'scher Bankverein, this latter still retaining its name and clientele. Close relations were established with other important financial and industrial institutions, its directorate having (1908) representation on the boards of 92 corporations.

That same year (1908) the capital was 170,000,000 marks; surplus, 57,592,611 marks; and annual dividend, 8 per cent. The total capital power of the Disconto-Gesellschaft group amounted to 564,747,329 marks, of which 437,786,200 marks represented capital and 126,981,129 marks surplus. It was the third-largest German joint-stock bank by total deposits, with a total of 219 million Marks, behind Deutsche Bank (489 million) and Dresdner Bank (225 million), and ahead of Darmstädter Bank (109 million) and A. Schaaffhausen'scher Bankverein (72 million). At that time, Disconto-Gesellschaft was referred to as one of the four "D-Banks" (all of which had names starting with a D) that dominated German commercial banking, together with Darmstädter Bank, Deutsche Bank, and Dresdner Bank.

In 1914, the Disconto-Gesellschaft acquired the Cologne-based A. Schaaffhausen'scher Bankverein, Germany's oldest joint-stock bank. The terms of the acquisition allowed the Bankverein to retain autonomous operations in the Rhineland, while its activity in Berlin was discontinued. That arrangement lasted until 1929, when the Disconto-Gesellschaft itself merged with the Deutsche Bank and Schaaffhausen was fully absorbed in the new combined entity.

== Gallery ==
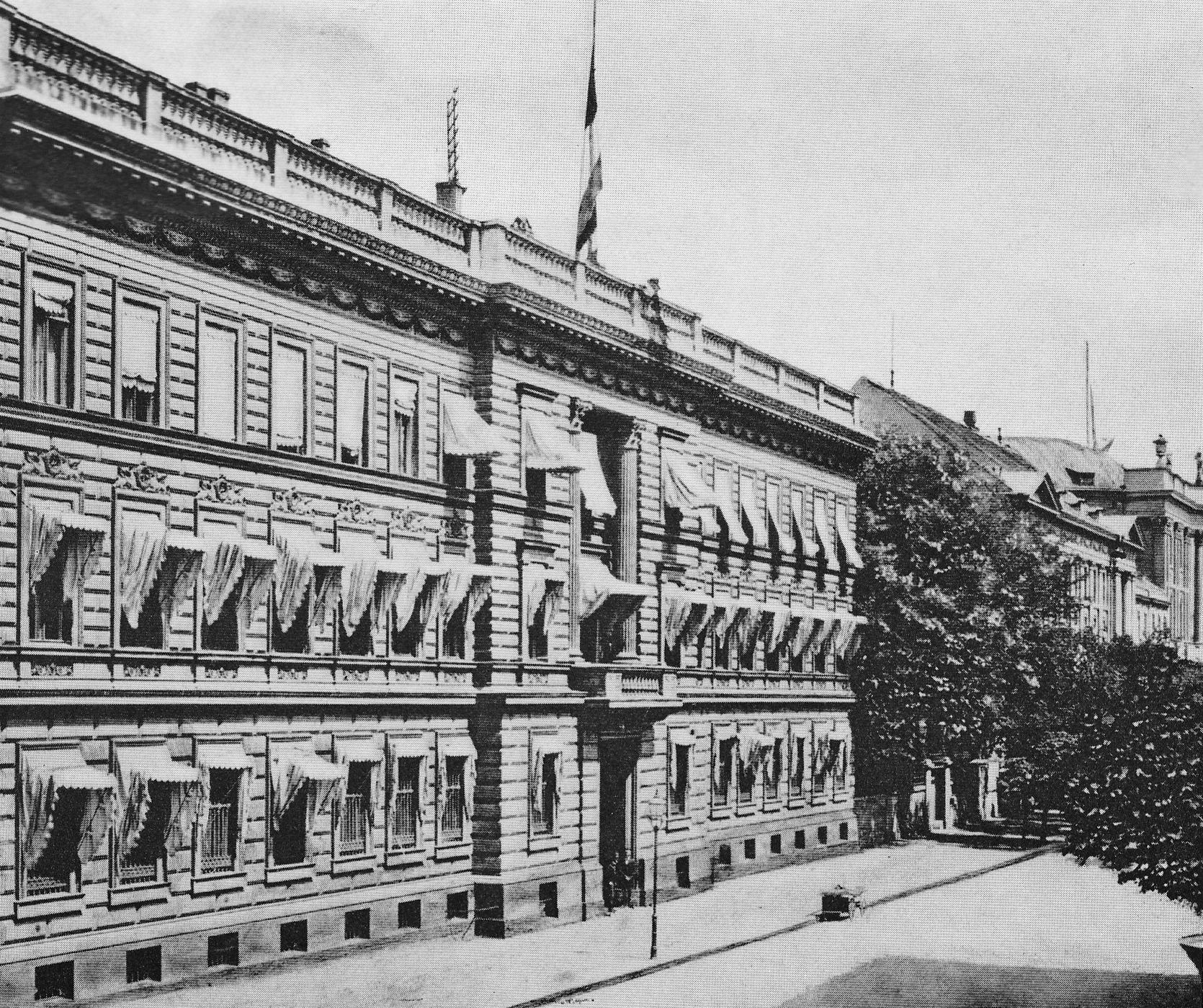
Head office on Behrenstrasse 43-44, erected 1868 by architect Friedrich Hitzig on a lot that the bank acquired in 1856; photographed in 1899 before demolition

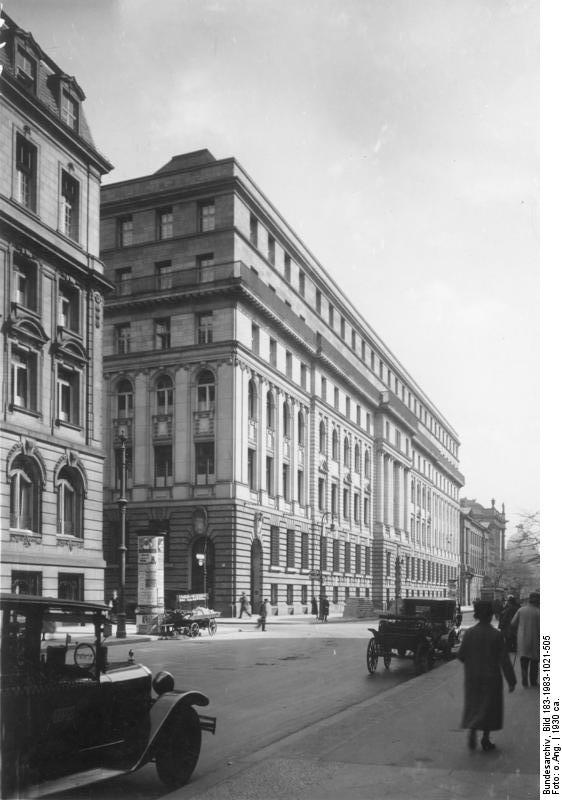
Head office on Behrensstrasse after reconstruction, photographed in 1930 after additional floors were added

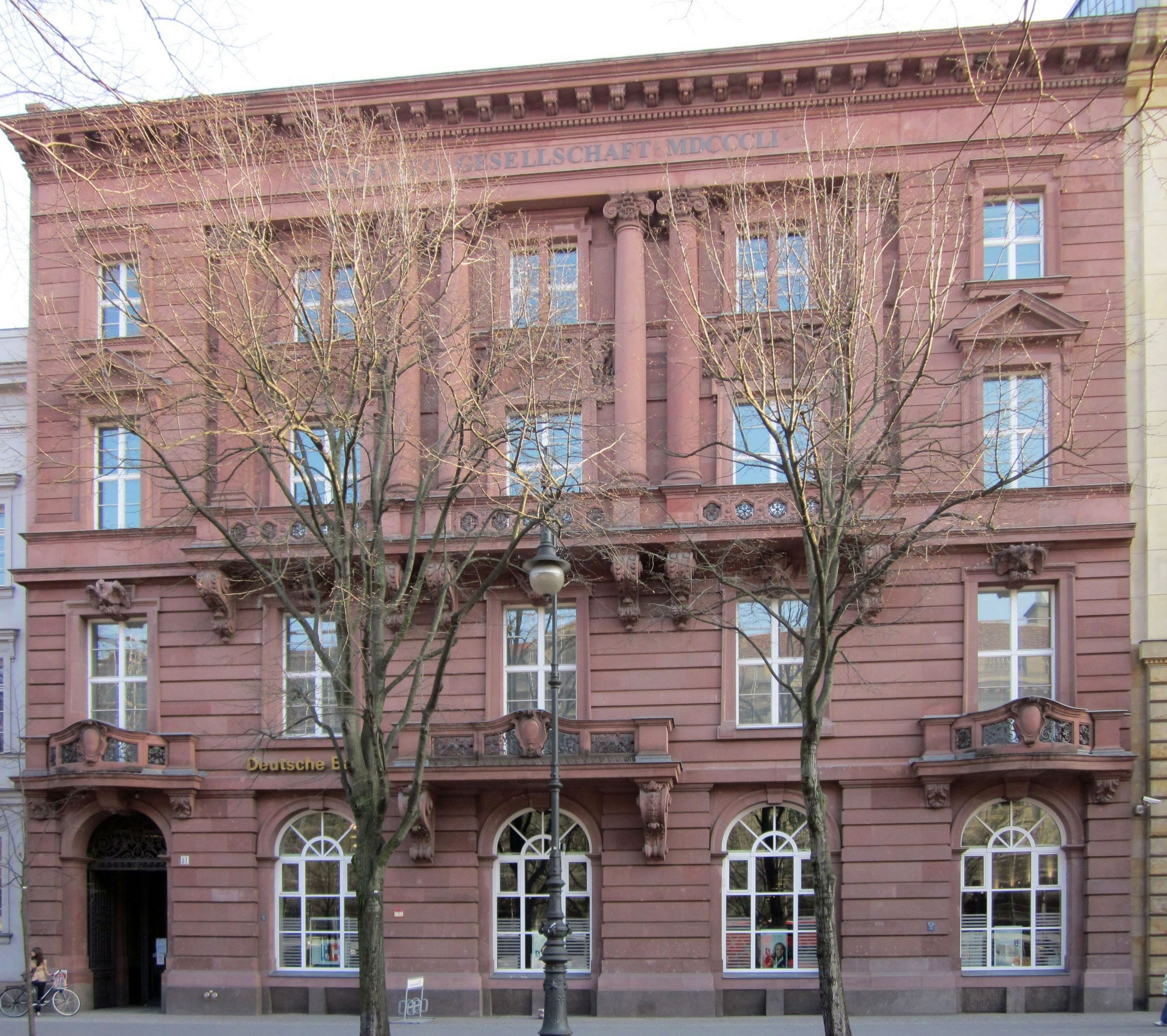
First head office expansion (1889-1891) on Unter den Linden 13, designed by architects Hermann Ende and Wilhelm Böckmann

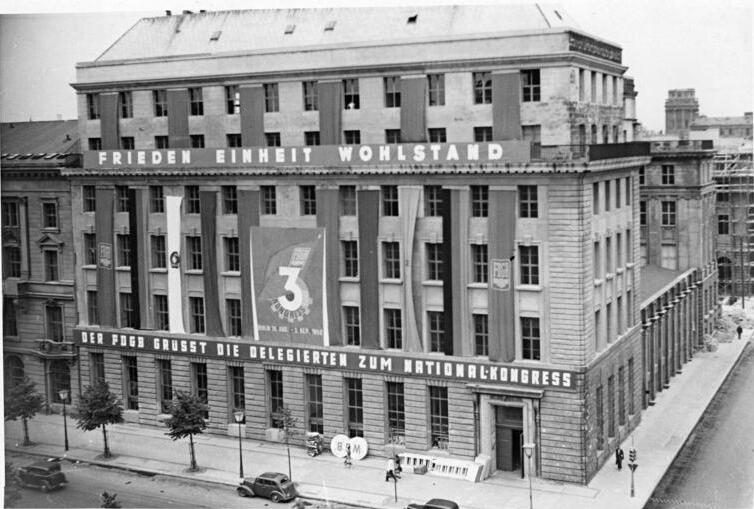
Second head office expansion (1922-1925) on Unter den Linden 15, designed by architects Richard Bielenberg and Josef Moser, later Reichsarbeitsministerium in the Nazi era, photographed in 1950

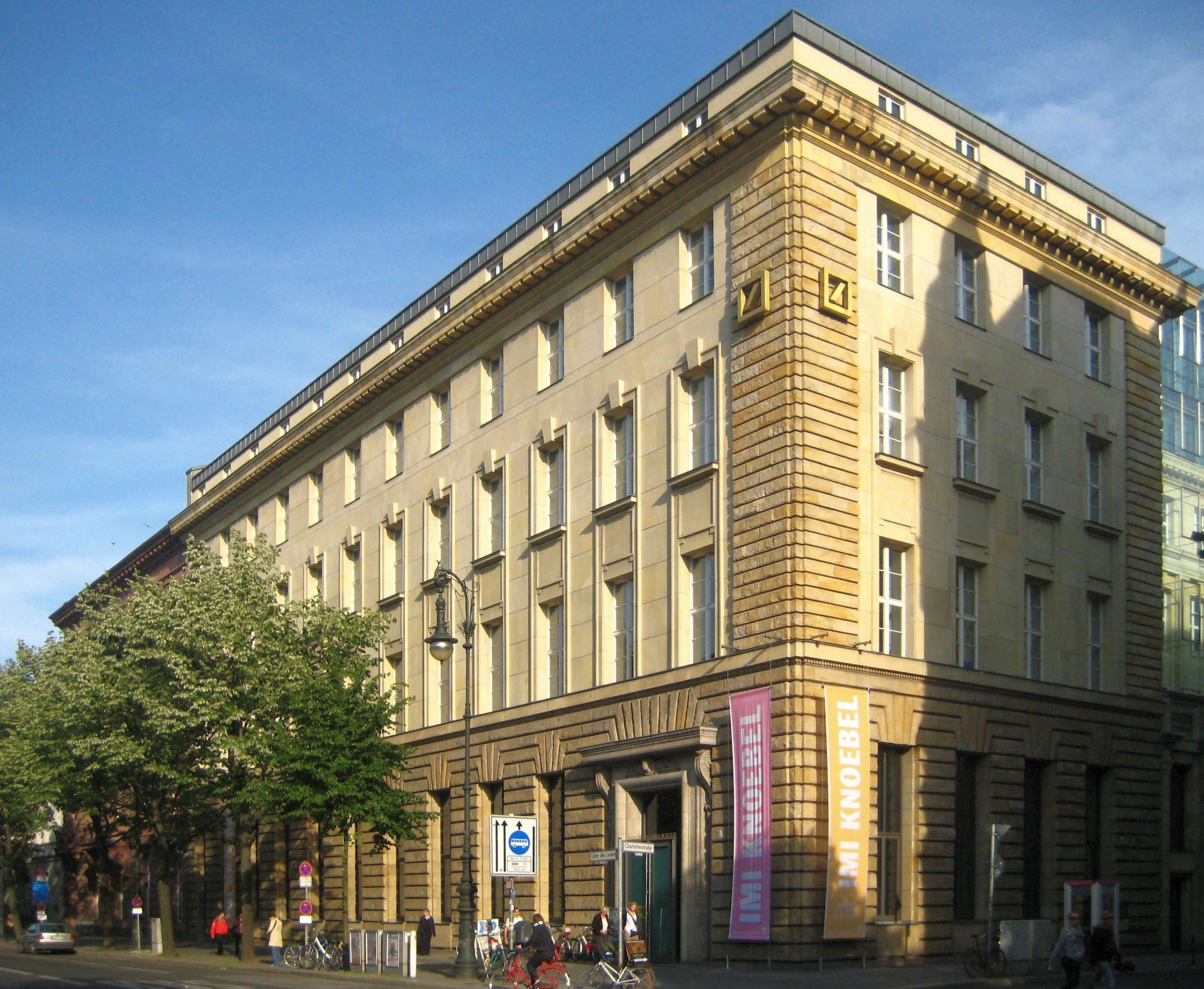
The same building in 2009, Deutsche Bank representative office in Berlin

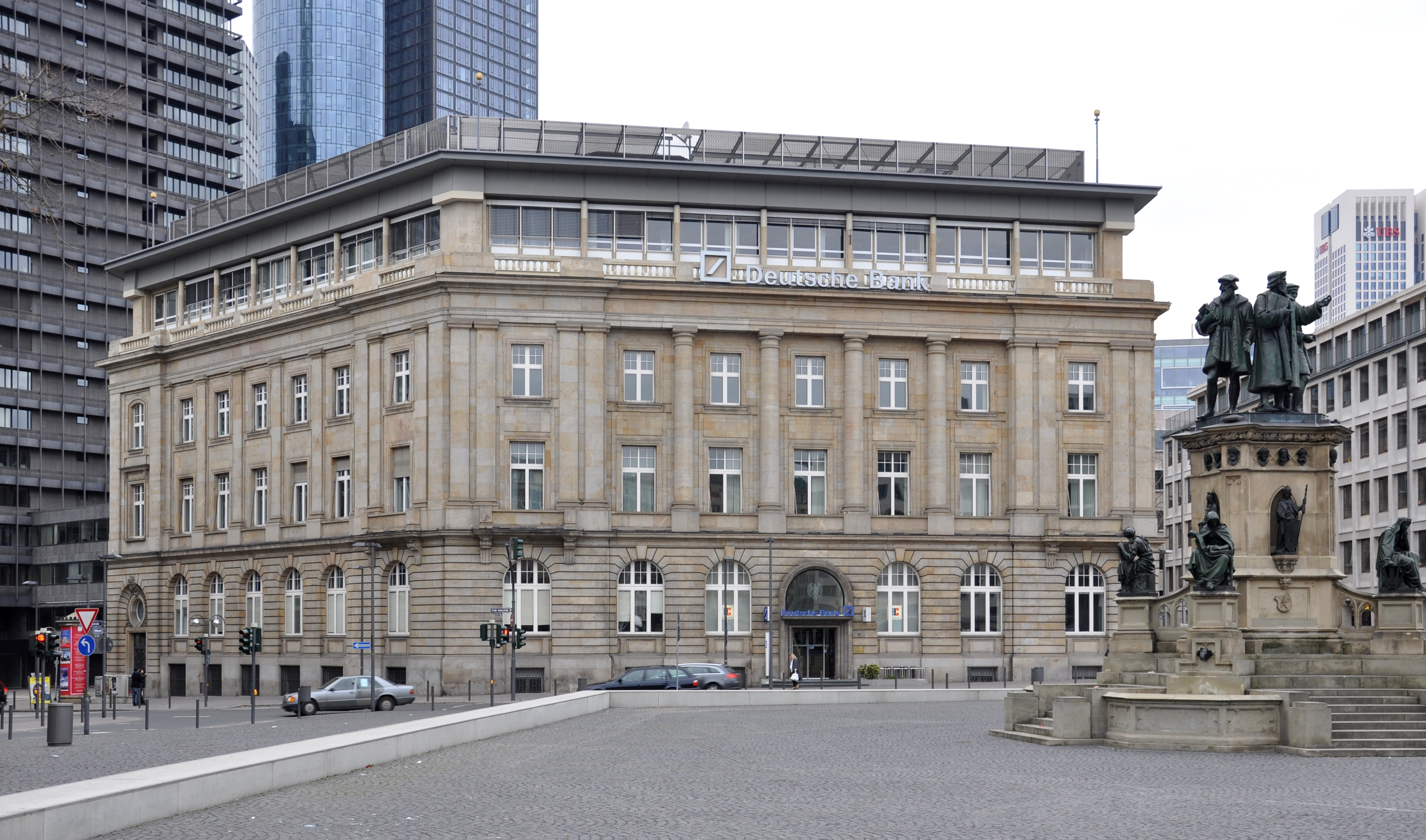
Former branch in Frankfurt erected in 1904, subsequently used by Deutsche Bank as its head office from 1957 to 1984

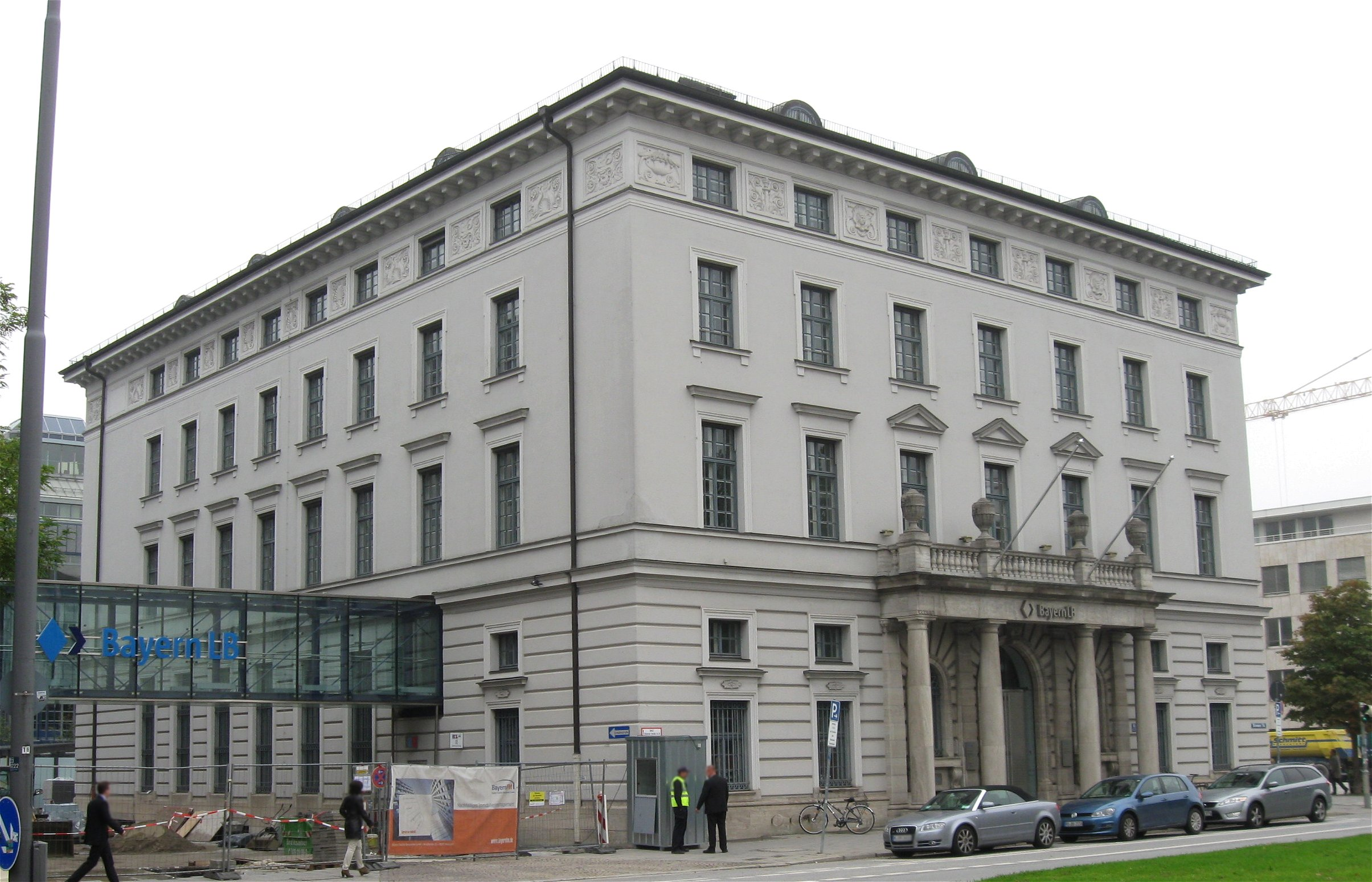
Former branch of the Disconto-Gesellschaft in Munich, lately head office of Bayerische Landesbank

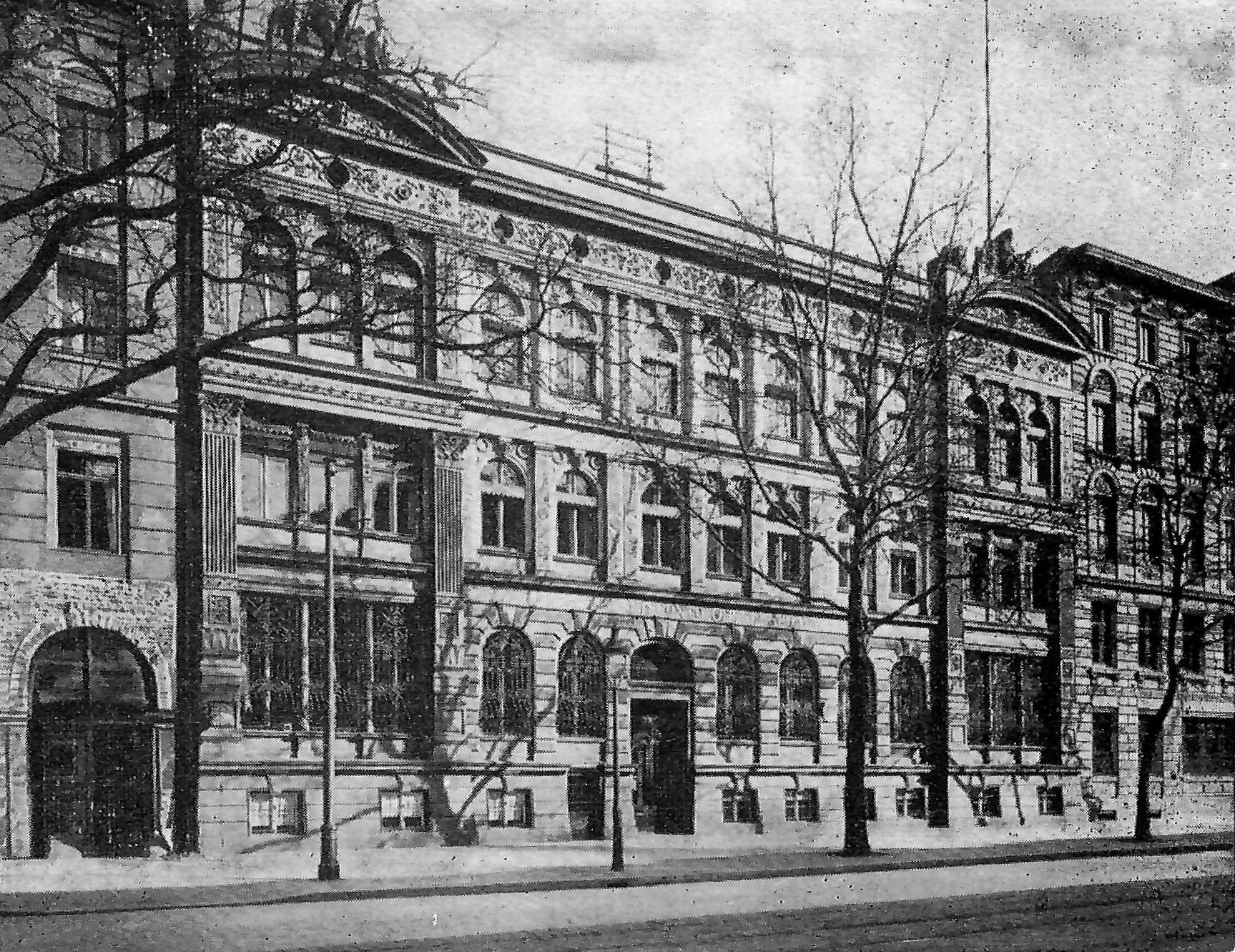
Branch in Magdeburg, photographed in 1927

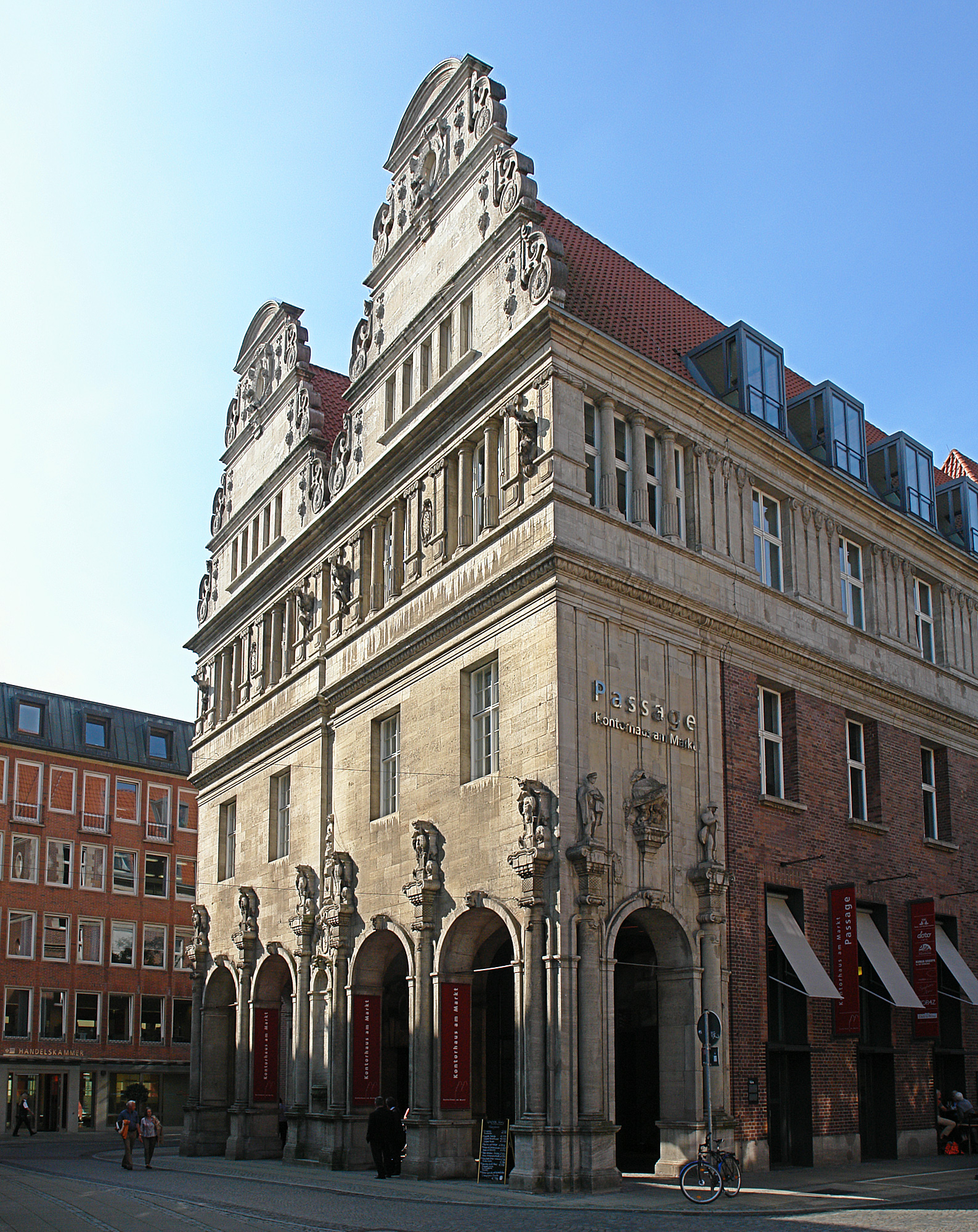
Kontorhaus am Markt in Bremen, repurposed in 1912 as a branch of Disconto-Gesellschaft

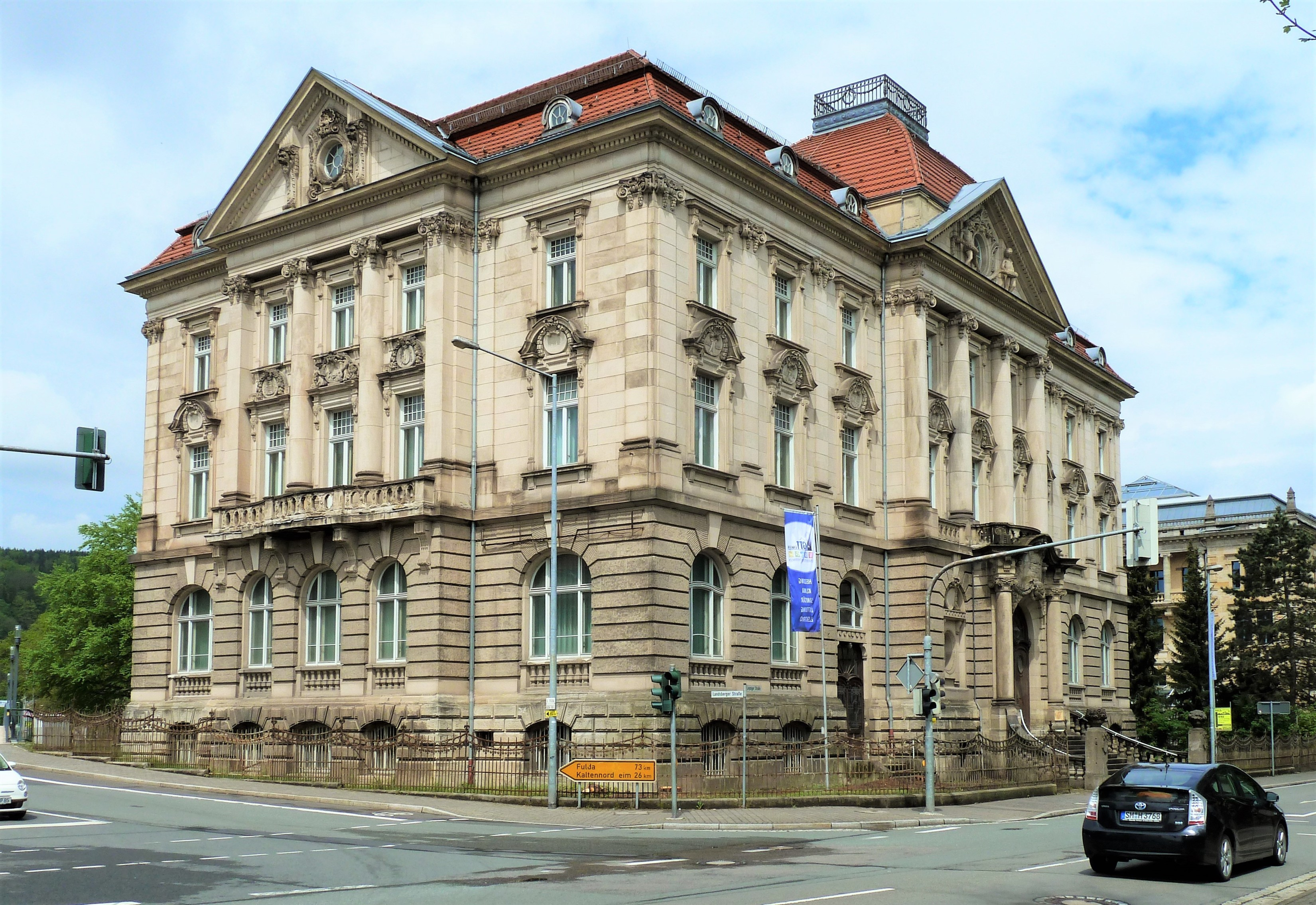
Bank für Thüringen in Meiningen, acquired by Disconto-Gesellschaft in 1926

== Notable associates ==
- David Hansemann (1851–1864)
- Karl Mathy (1855–1857)
- Adolph von Hansemann (1857–1903)
- Adolph Salomonsohn (1869–1888)
- Alexander Schoeller (1884–1911)
- Arthur Salomonsohn (1895–1929)
- Paul David Fischer, (1902–1920)
- Georg Solmssen (1911–1929)
- Hermann Fischer (1914–1919)

== See also ==
- A. Schaaffhausen'scher Bankverein
- Darmstädter Bank
- List of banks in Germany
