= Mabuso languages =

Madang language family of New Guinea

Mabuso
- Geographic distribution: New Guinea
- Linguistic classification: Madang: Central Madang; Mabuso
- Subdivisions: Hanseman; South Mabuso

Language codes
- ISO 639-3: –
- Glottolog: mabu1247

The Mabuso languages are a small family of closely related languages in New Guinea. They were linked with the Rai Coast languages in 1951 by Arthur Capell in his Madang family, which Wurm (1975) included in his Trans–New Guinea (TNG) phylum. Malcolm Ross reconstructed the pronouns of proto-Mabuso and noted that "the integrity of the Mabuso group is fairly obvious".

== Languages ==
- Hanseman languages (see)
- South Mabuso
  - Kokon: Girawa, Kein (Bemal)
  - Munit–Gum
    - Munit
    - Gum languages (see)
