= 1951 Papua New Guinean general election =

General elections were held in Papua and New Guinea for the first time on 10 November 1951.

== Electoral system ==
The Legislative Council was formed following the amalgamation of the Territory of Papua and the Territory of New Guinea after World War II. The bill passed by the Australian parliament provided for a 29-member Council consisting of the Administrator, 16 civil servants, nine members appointed by the Administrator (three representatives of the indigenous population, three representing European settlers and three representing missionaries) and three elected Europeans. The Administrator served as presiding officer of the legislature.

Voting was restricted to residents aged 21 or over who had lived in the territory for the last 12 months prior to registering to vote and were not classed as a native or alien. The Chinese community were also given the right to vote alongside Europeans. Candidates had to have lived continuously in the territory for the three years prior to submitting their nomination paper and not be a public employee.

The three elected members were elected from three single-member constituencies, New Guinea Islands, New Guinea Mainland and Papua by preferential voting.

== Results ==
Constituency	Candidate	Votes	%	Notes
New Guinea Islands	Don Barrett	150	52.6	Elected
New Guinea Islands	P.A. MacKenzie	95	33.3	
New Guinea Islands	G. Renton	40	14.0	
New Guinea Mainland	Carl Jacobsen	158	50.1	Elected
New Guinea Mainland	S.B. Barker	67	21.5	
New Guinea Mainland	N.H. White	66	21.2	
New Guinea Mainland	E.C.N. Helton	20	6.4	
Papua	Ernest James	268		Elected after vote transfers
Papua	J.I. Cromie	223		
Papua	J.R. Bleck			
Papua	T.F. Rosser			
Papua	M. Infante			
Papua	N.F. Maloney			
Invalid/blank votes			–	
Total		1,295	100	
Registered voters/turnout		1,697	76.3	
Source: Pacific Islands Monthly

=== Appointed members ===
Position		Member
Administrator		Jack Keith Murray
Civil servants	Chief Collector of Customs	Thomas Philip Myles Byrne
Civil servants	Acting Government Secretary	Claude Champion
Civil servants	Assistant Director of District Services and Native Affairs	Ivan Champion
Civil servants	Assistant Administrator	Donald Cleland
Civil servants	District Commissioner for Northern	Sydney Elliott-Smith
Civil servants	Acting Assistant Director of District Services and Native Affairs	John Rollo Foldi
Civil servants	Director of Education	William Groves
Civil servants	Director of Public Health	John Gunther
Civil servants	Secretary of Lands, Surveys and Mines	Eric Patrick Holmes
Civil servants	Director of District Services and Native Affairs	Bert Jones
Civil servants	Director of Forests	James Bannister McAdam
Civil servants	District Commissioner for New Britain	John Keith McCarthy
Civil servants	Acting Director of Agriculture, Stock and Fisheries	Colin Charles Marr
Civil servants	District Commissioner for Morobe	Horrie Niall
Civil servants	Treasurer and Director of Finance	Harold Reeve
Civil servants	Crown Law Officer	Walter William Watkins
Representatives of Europeans		Doris Booth
Representatives of Europeans		Basil Fairfax-Ross
Representatives of Europeans		John Bexley Sedgers
Representatives of Natives		Merari Dickson
Representatives of Natives		Aisoli Salin
Representatives of Natives		Pita Simogun
Representatives of Missionaries		James Dwyer
Representatives of Missionaries		Frank George Lewis
Representatives of Missionaries		David Eric Ure
Source: Pacific Islands Monthly

== Aftermath ==
The new Legislative Council met for the first time in Port Moresby on 26 November.

In February 1952 Steven Lonergan (Government Secretary) and R.E.P. Dwyer (Director of Agriculture) replaced Claude Champion and Colin Marr, who had been acting in their positions at the time the council was appointed. Thomas Byrne died in February 1952 and was temporarily replaced by Acting Chief Collector of Customs Thomas Grahamslaw until Frank Lee was appointed as Byrne's permanent replacement later in the year.

Bert Jones was replaced by the new Director of Native Affairs Alan Roberts in November 1953. C.D. Bates (District Commissioner for Morobe) and Douglas Macinnis (Secretary of Lands, Surveys and Mines) also joined the Council during its term.
