= 1954 Papua New Guinean general election =

General elections were held in Papua and New Guinea on 2 October 1954.

== Electoral system ==
The 29-member Legislative Council consisted of the Administrator, 16 civil servants, nine members appointed by the Administrator (three representatives of the indigenous population, three representing European settlers and three representing missionaries) and three elected Europeans. The Chinese community were also given the right to vote alongside Europeans. However, although there were around 13,000 Europeans and 2,000 Chinese in the territory, only around 2,700 people registered to vote.

The three elected members were elected from three single-member constituencies, New Guinea Islands, New Guinea Mainland and Papua by preferential voting. Voting was not compulsory.

== Campaign ==
Nominations for the three elected seats closed on 9 August, with five candidates put forward. The New Guinea Islands seat was contested by the incumbent Don Barrett and John Stokie, a plantation manager. In New Guinea Mainland, the incumbent Carl Jacobsen did not run, resulting in a contest between the theatre owner Harry Starr and optometrist and planter George Whittaker. Incumbent MLC Ernest James was the only candidate in Papua.

== Results ==
Constituency	Candidate	Votes	%	Notes
New Guinea Islands	Don Barrett	408	77.9	Re-elected
New Guinea Islands	John Stokie	116	22.1	
New Guinea Mainland	George Whittaker	145	78.4	Elected
New Guinea Mainland	Harry Starr	40	21.6	
Papua	Ernest James	Unopposed		Re-elected
Invalid/blank votes		25	–	
Total		734	100	
Registered voters/turnout		1,825	40.2	
Source: Pacific Islands Monthly

=== Appointed members ===
Position		Member
Administrator		Donald Cleland
Civil servants	Chief Collector of Customs	Frank Lee
Civil servants	Government Secretary	Steven Lonergan
Civil servants	Chief Native Lands Commissioner	Ivan Champion
Civil servants	Crown Law Officer	Walter William Watkins
Civil servants	Director of Agriculture, Stock and Fisheries	R.E.P. Dwyer
Civil servants	Director of District Services and Native Affairs	Alan Roberts
Civil servants	Acting Assistant Director of District Services and Native Affairs	John Rollo Foldi
Civil servants	Director of Education	William Groves
Civil servants	Director of Forests	James Bannister McAdam
Civil servants	Director of Health	John Gunther
Civil servants	District Commissioner for Central District	Sydney Elliott-Smith
Civil servants	District Commissioner for Madang	R.W. Wilson
Civil servants	District Commissioner for Morobe	Horrie Niall
Civil servants	District Commissioner for New Britain	John Keith McCarthy
Civil servants	Secretary of Lands, Surveys and Mines	Douglas Macinnis
Civil servants	Treasurer and Director of Finance	Harold Reeve
Representatives of Europeans		Doris Booth
Representatives of Europeans		Robert Bunting
Representatives of Europeans		Basil Fairfax-Ross
Representatives of Natives		Merari Dickson
Representatives of Natives		Pita Simogun
Representatives of Natives		John Vuia
Representatives of Missionaries		James Dwyer
Representatives of Missionaries		Frank George Lewis
Representatives of Missionaries		David Eric Ure
Source: Pacific Islands Monthly, Institute of Commonwealth Studies

== Aftermath ==
In March 1955 Frank Lee was replaced by Thomas Grahamslaw. Later in the year missionary representative Frank George Lewis left the territory and was replaced in the Council by Philip Strong.
