= 1957 Papua New Guinean general election =

General elections were held in Papua and New Guinea on 31 August 1957.

== Electoral system ==
The 29-member Legislative Council consisted of the Administrator, 16 civil servants, nine members appointed by the Administrator (three representatives of the indigenous population, three representing European settlers and three representing missionaries) and three elected Europeans. The Chinese community were also given the right to vote alongside Europeans.

The three elected members were elected from three single-member constituencies, New Guinea Islands, New Guinea Mainland and Papua by preferential voting. Voting was not compulsory.

Automatic postal voting was introduced for all registered voters who lived over ten miles from the nearest polling station.

== Campaign ==
In New Guinea Islands, incumbent MLC Don Barrett was opposed by Dudley Jones, a Rabaul lawyer.

George Whittaker did not stand for re-election in New Guinea Mainland after retiring. The seat was contested by Ian Downs, a former District Commissioner, and Sydney Barker, a dentist and miner from Wau.

The Papua seat was contested by the incumbent Ernest James and Craig Kirke, a solicitor based in Port Moresby.

== Results ==
Dudley Jones unexpectedly defeated Don Barrett in New Guinea Islands, whilst Ian Downs was elected in New Guinea Mainland and Ernest James was re-elected in Papua. Over 3,000 people voted, a significant increase on the 734 votes cast in the 1954 elections (although one seat had been uncontested).

=== Appointed members ===
Doris Booth declined to be re-nominated as a European member, with John Hohnen nominated in her place, whilst Merari Dickson was replaced by Mahuru Rarua-Rarua as a native representative.

Position	Member
Representatives of Europeans	Robert Bunting
Representatives of Europeans	Basil Fairfax-Ross
Representatives of Europeans	John Hohnen
Representatives of Natives	Mahuru Rarua-Rarua
Representatives of Natives	Pita Simogun
Representatives of Natives	John Vuia
Representatives of Missionaries	James Dwyer
Representatives of Missionaries	Philip Strong
Representatives of Missionaries	David Eric Ure
