= 1960 Papua New Guinean general election =

General elections were held in Papua and New Guinea on 27 August 1960.

== Electoral system ==
The 29-member Legislative Council consisted of the Administrator, 16 civil servants, nine members appointed by the Administrator (three representatives of the indigenous population, three representing European settlers and three representing missionaries) and three elected Europeans. The Chinese community were also given the right to vote alongside Europeans.

The three elected members were elected from three single-member constituencies, New Guinea Islands, New Guinea Mainland and Papua by preferential voting.

== Campaign ==
Two of the three seats were uncontested, with Craig Kirke, a Port Moresby solicitor and anti-income tax activist running unopposed in Papua and former MLC Don Barrett, a planter, the sole candidate in New Guinea Islands. The New Guinea Mainland seat was contested by former MLC Sydney Barker (a dentist and miner from Wau), Paul Hymna (an accountant from Lae), Lloyd Hurrell (a farmer in Wau) and Keith Watkins (a trader from Lae).

== Results ==
In the sole contested constituency, voter turnout was around 38%.

Constituency	Candidate	Votes	%	Notes
New Guinea Islands	Don Barrett	Unopposed		Elected
New Guinea Mainland	Lloyd Hurrell	304		Elected
New Guinea Mainland	Paul Hyman	109		
New Guinea Mainland	Sydney Barker			
New Guinea Mainland	Keith Watkins			
Papua	Craig Kirke	Unopposed		Elected
Invalid/blank votes			–	
Total				
Registered voters/turnout		1,313		
Source: Pacific Islands Monthly

=== Appointed members ===
Reuben Taureka was appointed as an official member, replacing the Director of Native Affairs, becoming the first official indigenous member.

Position	Member
Representatives of Europeans	Robert Bunting
Representatives of Europeans	Basil Fairfax-Ross
Representatives of Europeans	John Hohnen
Representatives of Natives	Mahuru Rarua-Rarua
Representatives of Natives	Pita Simogun
Representatives of Natives	John Vuia
Representatives of Missionaries	James Dwyer
Representatives of Missionaries	Philip Strong
Representatives of Missionaries	David Eric Ure
