= 1959 Papua New Guinean by-elections =

By-elections for all three elected seats in the Legislative Council were held in Papua and New Guinea on 12 September 1959. The incumbent MLCs had resigned due to the imposition of income tax in the territory by the Australian government. All three seats were won by candidates supported by the Taxpayers' Association (which opposed the new tax). The three new MLCs all resigned by 1 October.

== Background ==
On 22 June 1959 the three elected members of the Legislative Council – Ian Downs, Ernest James and Dudley Jones – resigned from the Council, issuing a joint statement saying that the income tax legislation had been introduced without an inquiry they had demanded, that the public did not have adequate representation on the Council and that the proposed legislation was too complicated and contained several anomalies. The three also stated that they would not run for re-election unless the council was made more representative.

== Campaign ==
Despite threats to boycott the elections, by the time nominations closed on 4 August, both the New Guinea Islands and Papua constituencies had two candidates, and only the New Guinea Mainland constituency had no nominations, although Sydney Barker's nomination for the seat arrived four minutes late. When nominations re-opened on 1 September, Barker submitted his application and became the sole contestant.

New Guinea Islands was contested by John Chipper, a contractor in Rabaul, and William Thomas, a planter in Kokopo. Papua was contested by Stephenson Fox, an accountant, and Vincent Sanders, a contractor. Chipper and Sanders were both backed by the Taxpayers' Association and pledged to resign if requested. Barker also pledged to resign if required.

== Results ==
Constituency	Candidate	Party	Votes	%	Notes
New Guinea Islands	John Chipper	Taxpayers' Association	367	87.2	Elected
New Guinea Islands	William Thomas	Independent	54	12.8	
New Guinea Mainland	Sydney Barker	Taxpayers' Association	Unopposed		Elected
Papua	Vincent Sanders	Taxpayers' Association	394	65.8	Elected
Papua	Stephenson Fox	Independent	205	34.2	
Total			1,020	100	
Source: Pacific Islands Monthly

== Aftermath ==
All three elected members resigned shortly after the elections; Chipper and Sanders resigned on 29 September and Barker two days later.
