= John Bexley Sedgers =

Nominated Member of the Legislative Council
- In office 1951–1954
- Succeeded by: Robert Bunting

Personal details
- Died: June 1969; Sydney, Australia

John Bexley Sedgers (died June 1969) was an Australian businessman. He spent much of his career in the Territory of Papua and New Guinea, where he served in the Legislative Council from 1951 to 1954.

== Biography ==
Sedgers joined W.R. Carpenter as a shipping clerk in 1917. After a spell working on its Mascot ship on the Australia–Solomon Islands route, he worked in Tulagi in the Solomon Islands and then Rabaul in the Territory of New Guinea. He later worked in Kavieng, Salamaua and Wau.

Following the Japanese invasion, he and colleague B.B. Perriman were given responsibility for evacuating civilians from Wau. After around 180 people were airlifted, the remainder (including Sedgers) walked 200 miles to Port Moresby. He then went back to Australia, before returning to New Guinea in 1945, working in Madang. In 1951 he was appointed managing director and chairman of the New Guinea branch of Carpenters, moving to Rabaul. Prior to the elections to the new Legislative Council the same year, he was one of the three European members appointed to the body. He served in the council until the 1954 elections.

He later became a member of the committee of Rabaul Turf Club. After retiring in the early 1960s, he moved back to Australia. He died in June 1969, survived by his wife and three children.
