= Claude Champion =

Australian public servant in Papua New Guinea

Official Member of the Legislative Council
- In office 1951–1952, 1959–1961

Personal details
- Born: 30 June 1906 Port Moresby, Papua
- Died: September 1982 (aged 76) Sydney, Australia

Claude Champion (30 June 1906 – September 1982) was an Australian public servant in Papua New Guinea. He served as a member of the Legislative Council in two spells between 1951 and 1961.

== Biography ==
Born in 1906 to Herbert Champion, who served as Government Secretary of the Territory of Papua from 1913 to 1942, Claude was educated at the Southport School in Queensland. Despite being discouraged from joining the civil service by his father, who feared being accused of nepotism, he was appointed a government clerk in 1927, before becoming a patrol officer the following year. During World War II he was a member of the Australian New Guinea Administrative Unit from 1942 to 1946, rising to the rank of major.

Following the war, he was appointed Assistant Government Secretary. While he was acting as Government Secretary in the early 1950s, he was appointed to the Legislative Council following the 1951 elections, alongside his brother Ivan. He remained a member until the following year when Steven Lonergan was appointed as permanent Government Secretary. He was awarded the Queen Elizabeth II Coronation Medal in 1953. In 1959 he was appointed Director of Civil Affairs, and also returned to the Legislative Council, as well as joining the Executive Council.

He retired in 1961 and moved to Australia. Following his retirement, he joined the Retired Officers Association of Papua New Guinea. He died in the Dee Why area of Sydney in September 1982 due to liver failure.
