= John Rollo Foldi =

Official Member of the Legislative Council
- In office 1951–1964

Personal details
- Born: Scotland
- Died: December 1971 (aged 67) Sydney, Australia

John Rollo Foldi MBE (died December 1971) was a Scottish-born public servant. He held several senior roles in the Territory of Papua and New Guinea and was a member of the Legislative Council.

== Biography ==
Born in Scotland, Foldi moved to the Territory of Papua to work on the Robinson River plantation. He joined the territorial civil service, initially worked on the Laurabada government ship. In October 1930 he married Melva Ramage. During World War II he became a major in the Australian New Guinea Administrative Unit.

Following the war, Foldi joined the Department of District Services, rising to become a District Commissioner and assistant director. As a result of his senior roles, he was appointed to the Legislative Council following the 1951 elections. He was made an MBE in the 1963 New Year Honours.

He retired in 1965 and died in Sydney in December 1971, survived by his wife and two sons.
