= Ernest James =

Ernest James may refer to:

- Ernest James (politician) (1893–1963), accountant, newspaper proprietor and politician in the territory of Papua New Guinea
- J. Ernest James (c. 1884–1945), Congregational minister in Australia
- Ern James (1883–1973), Australian rules footballer
