= Thomas Grahamslaw =

Australian public servant

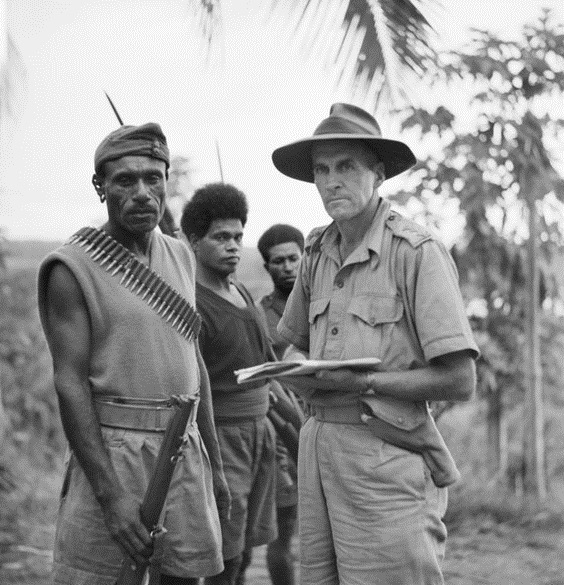
- Grahamslaw in 1942

Official Member of the Legislative Council of Papua and New Guinea
- In office 1955–1960
- Preceded by: Frank Lee
- In office 1952
- Preceded by: Thomas Byrne
- Succeeded by: Frank Lee

Personal details
- Born: 3 March 1901 Townsville, Queensland
- Died: 16 December 1973 (aged 72) Gosford, New South Wales

Military service
- Allegiance: Australia
- Branch/service: Second Australian Imperial Force
- Years of service: 1942–1946
- Rank: Lieutenant Colonel
- Unit: Australian New Guinea Administrative Unit
- Battles/wars: Second World War
- Awards: Officer of the Order of the British Empire

Thomas Grahamslaw, OBE (3 March 1901 – 16 December 1973) was an Australian public servant. He spent most of his life in Papua and New Guinea, where he worked as a civil servant and served as an official member of the Legislative Council.

== Biography ==
Grahamslaw was born in Townsville in 1901, the eldest of six children of Annie (née Meldon) and James Grahamslaw. His father was a tinsmith who had immigrated from Scotland, while his mother had been born in Australia. The family moved to the Territory of Papua in 1911, with Grahamslaw attending school in Port Moresby.

Grahamslaw left school at the age of 14 to work as a grocer's boy at the British New Guinea Development Company shop. In 1916 he joined the territory's civil service as a cadet clerk. He was appointed Acting Collector of Customs in Daru in 1924, later becoming moving to Woodlark Island, where his roles included gaoler inspector of native labour and mining registrar, and then Samarai where was postmaster and collector of customs. He married May McLean in Port Moresby in 1939 and became fluent in several indigenous languages.

During the Second World War, Grahamslaw joined the Australian New Guinea Administrative Unit and was appointed as a district officer for Northern District. Having walked from the north to the south coast of New Guinea alone following the Japanese invasion, he helped prepare Australian soldiers for the Kokoda Track campaign. He was temporarily promoted to major and was appointed an Officer of the Order of the British Empire in 1943 for his efforts during the Battle of Buna–Gona. In 1943 he transferred to the Second Australian Imperial Force, and in early 1944 was given responsibility for Lakekaum district, before taking over the administration of a much larger area later in the year. In 1945 he was promoted to lieutenant colonel, remaining in the army until being demobilised in February 1946.

Following the war, Grahamslaw rejoined the civil service, becoming Superintendent of Stores and then Assistant Collector of Customs in 1949. Following the death of Chief Collector of Customs Thomas Byrne in February 1952, he became Acting Chief Collector of Customs, also serving in the Legislative Council until Frank Lee was appointed as Byrne's permanent replacement later in the year.

In 1955, Grahamslaw succeeded Lee as Collector of Customs, and rejoined the Legislative Council. In 1960 he was also appointed to the Executive Council. He retired the following year and moved to New South Wales. His first marriage having ended in divorce, he married Mary Emilie Chase in October 1961. He died in December 1973 in Gosford.
