= Japanese settlement in Papua New Guinea =

Minor early-1900s immigrant community

パプアニューギニアの日本人居留地
- (Japan) (Papua New Guinea)
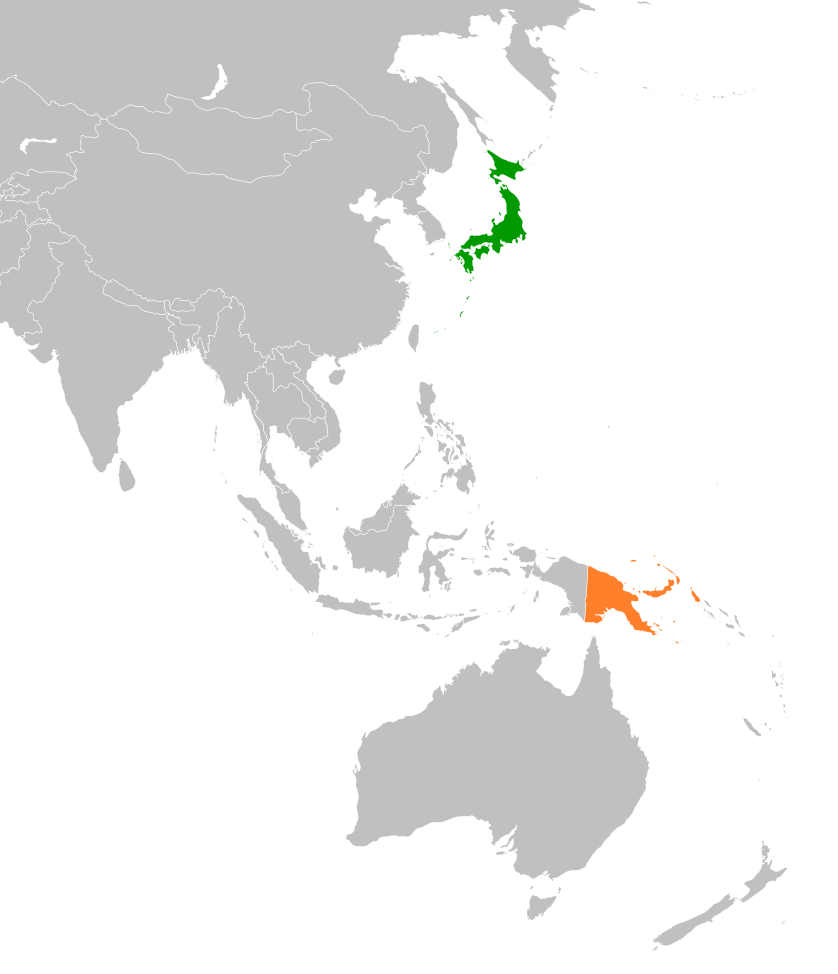

Total population
- 207 (2007)

Regions with significant populations
- Rabaul, Lae, Mount Hagen and Port Moresby

Languages
- Papuan languages, English, Japanese

Religion
- Predominantly Roman Catholicism, Shintoism and Mahayana Buddhism

Related ethnic groups
- Papuans, Japanese

Japanese settlement in the Territory of Papua and German New Guinea (in what now constitutes modern-day Papua New Guinea) dates back to the early 20th century when migrants from Japan established copra plantations and trading businesses in the islands, specifically Rabaul. The Japanese community remained small throughout the first half of the 20th century, although there were Japanese migrating in and out of New Guinea in different years from 1901 to 1945, it generally never exceeded more than 100 as a whole community. Some Japanese stayed for short terms and were replaced by newer emigrants from Japan, others stayed for longer periods depending on their roles. Most Japanese in Papua were businessmen and plantation managers, although a few became fishermen. As almost all the migrants were men, many of them married local Papuan wives and raised mixed-race Japanese-Papuan families while other Japanese men staying only for short periods also had sexual cohabitations with local Papuan women, but in most cases without marrying. Many of them did produce offspring but they were generally abandoned by their Japanese fathers (some of whom were already married with children in Japan) and raised by their single Papuan mothers or sent to the orphanage. These abandoned mixed-race children's were recorded as ethnic Papuans in the census as the ethnicity of their fathers was unknown.

During World War II, the Imperial Japanese Army invaded New Guinea with 350,000 troops and occupied most of its territory from January 1942 to August 1945. Some Papuan women including mixed-race Japanese-Papuan women were forced to become comfort women. Most Japanese in the unoccupied areas of New Guinea were deported to Australia where they were confined. The majority of them were repatriated to Japan after the war, although their mixed-race children were allowed to remain behind and assimilated with the local populace. Official estimates show 207 Japanese-Papuan mixed descendants.

== History ==
=== Early years ===
The first recorded Japanese presence in German New Guinea dates back to the beginning of the 20th century when a pearl diver, Isokichi Komine from Thursday Island in the Torres Strait Islands relocated to Rabaul in October 1901. Upon settling in Rabaul, Komine worked for its governor Albert Hahl in the plantation, trade and shipbuilding fields. Komine secured a thirty-year land lease from Hahl to build a shipyard on Rabaul in 1907, in addition to several other land concessions for copra plantation. At this time, Japanese migrants in Rabaul and the neighbouring islands joined Komine and worked for him. Other migrants settled in Port Moresby and Samarai. When World War I broke out in 1914, Japanese settlers in Rabaul experienced political tension as relations between Germany and Japan weakened. When Japan declared war against Germany in 1914, Komine aligned with the Australians, but also maintained close ties with German businessmen to safeguard his business interests. A few more Japanese migrated to New Guinea between 1914 and 1918 and established new independent enterprises that competed with Komine's, consisting mainly of copra plantations, pearl diving and trade. One Japanese businessman, Imaizumi Masao diversified into the entertainment industry and set up a picture theatre, New Britain Pictures in 1916.

Some of Japanese settlers who lived in the plantations occasionally suffered from tropical ailments including malaria, although fatalities were rare. In Rabaul's Chinatown, Japanese settlers became shopkeepers. Japanese settlers generally maintained cordial relations with the natives, and a sizeable majority intermarried with the natives from the 1910s onwards, although a few settlers brought their wives and families from Japan along. In the 1920s and 1930s, Japanese immigration to New Guinea remained minimal, which was attributed to strict immigration laws that was imposed by the Australian colonial government and discouraged Japanese settlement in New Guinea. In 1932, the Japanese community formed a Japanese society at Rabaul and nominated Nagahama Taichi as its first president. The Japanese maintained contact with Japan through a regular trading ship which visited Rabaul through Pohnpei. Around the same time, children of the first Japanese settlers—usually offspring of Japanese fathers and Papuan mothers—inherited their father's business enterprises.

=== World War II, comfort women and aftermath ===
A few Japanese left New Guinea between 1940 and 1941 in the Second World War, as Japanese reconnaissance planes were often spotted in New Guinea's skies, hinting at the prospect of a Japanese invasion. A trading ship from the South Seas Trading Company offered to help Japanese residents leave New Guinea, but some thirty-three Japanese chose to stay behind, ten of whom had raised local families during the interwar years. When reports of the attack on Pearl Harbor reached the Australian colonial administration on 8 December 1941, Japanese residents at Rabaul were immediately arrested and interned at the local jail, while the search and arrest for other Japanese residents in the neighbouring islands continued until May 1942. Indigenous spouses of Japanese residents as well as mixed-race Japanese children also faced similar fates as the other Japanese residents. When the Japanese captured Rabaul in January 1942, the Japanese residents who were interned were relocated to Sydney, although their native spouses and children were left behind. The former residents were joined by other Japanese prisoners-of-war from New Hebrides, New Caledonia and those from other parts of Australia.

When the Japanese arrived in Rabaul in 1942, Japanese residents who were not captured welcomed the Japanese soldiers, who released the mixed-race Japanese from internment. Most of them initially held suspicions of the presence of Japanese military personnel, which was partly fuelled by the absence of their Japanese fathers who were relocated to concentration camps in Australia. During the Japanese occupation from 1942 to 1945, mixed-race Japanese children were conscripted to clerical or light menial work within the military administration, and some received a Japanese education. At least one mixed-race Japanese, Pius Kikuchi, described the treatment of the Japanese military administration to the mixed-race children as gentle but discipline-oriented in nature. In other areas of Papua New Guinea which remained under Australian control, families of Japanese residents generally received harsh treatment from the Australian military. "Comfort women" formed another major component of the local Japanese community during the Japanese occupation years, which consisted of up to 3,000 Japanese and Korean women who were stationed in Rabaul's Chinatown which was frequented by Japanese military personnel. Apart from local Papuan women also serving as comfort women, one Australian Captain, David Hutchinson-Smith, also mentioned of some mixed-race, young Japanese-Papuan girls who were also conscripted as comfort women.

After the Japanese surrender in 1945, former Japanese residents of Rabaul were automatically to be repatriated to Japan, and a debate ensued on the fate of ten former Japanese residents who had raised local families. Among the local populace, there was considerable anti-Japanese sentiment and graves of the first Japanese settlers were exhumed along with those of the Japanese soldiers and thrown into the sea. One Japanese resident was released from detention immediately after reaching Samarai. Another former resident, Izumi died of illness during internment and eight others were held under military custody until 1949 before they were deported to Japan. All eight former residents returned to Japan and realised that their assets in Japan and New Guinea were confiscated, although a few were able to re-integrate into the mainstream Japanese society. Some former residents maintained links with their native wives for a few years before remarrying in Japan, but none of them returned to Papua New Guinea throughout their remaining lives. The mixed-race Japanese assimilated with the local populace within a few years after the war and identified themselves as Papuans.

== Cultural profile ==
A 1921 census counted 87 individuals, and the number of Japanese residents in New Guinea witnessed a decline until here were only 36 in 1940. Approximately one third were businessmen living in Rabaul, while the remainder were plantation managers and fishermen who lived mainly in Manus, New Ireland and Bougainville. In particular, a census done in 1933 counted 29 second-generation Japanese residents – these comprised mixed-race Japanese Papuans as well as a few full-blooded Japanese, and nine long-term Japanese residents in Papua. First-generation Japanese residents were mostly adherents of Shinto and Buddhism, although they generally avoided celebrating religious or cultural festivals in public. No Japanese Shinto or Buddhist shrines were built during the interwar years, and Japanese residents publicly celebrated Australian holidays to avoid rousing suspicion from the Australian authorities. Upon marrying a native wife, Japanese residents conduct their wedding ceremonies in Christian churches, and often send their children to Catholic Mission schools. Most mixed-race children were taught to speak Papuan languages and English from infancy, and had little knowledge of the Japanese language and customs. During the Japanese occupation, mixed-race Japanese were taught in the Japanese language as well as its cultural customs.

== Notable people ==
- Emi Maria, Papuan New Guinean singer of Japanese descent

== See also ==
- Chinese people in Papua New Guinea
- Copra plantations in New Guinea

== Bibliography ==
- Gosden, Chris; Knowles, Chantal, Collecting Colonialism: Material Culture and Colonial Change, Berg Publishers, 2001, ISBN 1-85973-408-1
