= Geoffrey Roscoe =

Australian educator and public servant (1900–1985)

Director of Education of Papua and New Guinea
- In office 1958–1962
- Preceded by: William Groves
- Succeeded by: Les Johnson

Official Member of the Legislative Council
- In office 1958–1962
- Preceded by: William Groves
- Succeeded by: Les Johnson

Personal details
- Born: 30 June 1900; Brisbane, Australia
- Died: 7 June 1985 (aged 84); Brisbane, Australia

Geoffrey Thomas Roscoe (30 June 1900 – 7 June 1985) was an Australian educator and public servant. He spent the latter part of his career in the Territory of Papua and New Guinea where he served as Director of Education and was a member of the Legislative Council.

== Biography ==
Roscoe was born in Brisbane in June 1900. He was educated at the Normal School and then attended the University of Queensland. He started working as a schoolteacher in Brisbane in 1921, becoming a headteacher in Condamine. He married May Webster O'Donnell in December 1928; the couple had three children. He started lecturing at Brisbane Teachers College in 1929, and earnt an MA at the University of Queensland in 1931. During World War II he served in the Volunteer Defence Corp. In 1945 he became headteacher of Charters Towers State High School.

In 1947 Roscoe was appointed Chief Inspector of Schools in the Territory of Papua and New Guinea. In 1956 he became Chief of the Division of Native Education, and two years later he was appointed Director of Education, also becoming an official member of the Legislative Council. His appointment came as a surprise; his predecessor William Groves was opposed to his appointment and Roscoe was only told the news by a radio announcer shortly before they were about to broadcast the information. He retired in 1962, and returned to Australia where he began teaching again and then earned a graduate diploma in library science from the University of Queensland in 1965.

He died in Brisbane in June 1985.
