= Don Barrett =

Australian politician

Member of the House of Assembly
- In office 1964–1968
- Constituency: West Gazelle Special

Member of the Legislative Council
- In office 1951–1957
- Succeeded by: Dudley Jones
- Constituency: New Guinea Islands
- In office 1960–1961
- Preceded by: John Chipper
- Succeeded by: Paul Mason
- Constituency: New Guinea Islands
- In office 1961–1964
- Constituency: New Britain (European)

Personal details
- Born: 16 October 1917 Adelaide, Australia
- Died: January 1973 (aged 55) Rabaul, Papua and New Guinea

Donald Barrett (16 October 1917 – January 1973) was an Australian planter, army major, politician and sports coach in the Territory of Papua and New Guinea. He served as a member of the Legislative Council and House of Assembly in two spells between 1951 and 1968.

== Biography ==
Born in Adelaide in 1917, the son of Charles Barrett, Barrett attended Caulfield Grammar School before studying at the University of Melbourne. During World War II he served with the Second Australian Imperial Force and the 2nd New Guinea Infantry Battalion.

After the war Barrett settled in Papua New Guinea and ran cacao and coconut plantations. He helped found and became president of the Planters' Association of New Guinea and was a member of the Copra Marketing Board between 1949 and 1958. He also continued part-time military service, serving as a major in the Papua New Guinea Volunteer Rifles from 1954 until 1958, as state vice-president of the Returned and Services League of Australia between 1959 and 1964, and as a recruiting officer from 1960.

In 1951 he successfully contested the New Guinea Islands seat in the first elections to the Legislative Council. He was re-elected in 1954 with 78% of the vote, but was defeated by Dudley Jones in the 1957 elections. He contested the New Guinea Islands seat in the 1960 elections, and was returned unopposed. In the 1961 elections he won the new New Britain (European) constituency, running as a candidate of the United Progress Party. In 1963 he managed the Papua and New Guinea athletics team that competed at the first South Pacific Games.

In the 1964 elections to the new House of Assembly, the first held under universal suffrage, Barrett was elected from the West Gazelle Special constituency. One of the most active members of the new legislature, he became chair of the Public Accounts Committee in 1965. Although the committee produced several lengthy reports, they made little impression. He ran for reelection in the East and West New Britain Regional constituency in 1968, but was heavily defeated by Roy Ashton. In addition to territory politics, he also served on Rabaul Town Advisory Council, including a stint as mayor.

He subsequently organised the 1969 South Pacific Games that were held in Port Moresby, and became chairman of the Melanesian Tourist Federation.

Barrett died following an operation for peritonitis at Nonga Base Hospital in Rabaul in January 1973 at the age of 55.
