= Charles Leslie Barrett =

Australian naturalist, journalist, author and ornithologist

Charles Barrett
- Born: 26 June 1879; Hawthorn, Victoria, British Empire
- Died: 16 January 1959 (aged 79) Melbourne, Victoria, Australia
- Allegiance: Australia
- Service years: 1916-1917
- Spouse: Florence Williams (m. 1911)
- Children: Donald and 1 daughter

Charles Leslie Barrett (26 June 1879 – 16 January 1959) was an Australian naturalist, journalist, author, and ornithologist.

Born in Hawthorn, Victoria, he was a foundation member of the Royal Australasian Ornithologists Union (RAOU) in 1901 and editor of its journal the Emu, 1910–1916. He also wrote for Walkabout. In 1953, he was awarded the Australian Natural History Medallion.

Charles Barrett also served in the AIF during World War 1. He embarked from Melbourne in May 1917 as a member of a contingent of reinforcements for the Camel Field Ambulance Unit, and served in Egypt and Palestine. His 1942 book, "On the Wallaby. Quest and adventure in many lands" contains an account and photographs of this mission.

His son Donald moved to Papua and New Guinea, where he served as a member of the Legislative Council and House of Assembly.

== Bibliography ==
As well as many articles, he wrote or contributed to numerous popular books on natural history, as well as his own travels and experiences. Some of these are:

- Barrett, Charles. (1907). From Range to Sea. A bird lover's ways. T.C. Lothian: Melbourne.
- Barrett, Charles (1913) The Bush Ramblers. T. Shaw Fitchett, Melbourne.
- Barrett, Charles (1915) The Isle of Palms. Lothian, Melbourne.
- Barrett, Charles. (1919). In Australian Wilds. The gleanings of a naturalist. Melbourne Publishing Co: Melbourne.
- Barrett, Charles (1922) Egyptian Hours. Whitehead Morris, Alexandria.
- Barrett, Charles. (1923). Rambles Round the Zoo. Whitcombe & Tombs Ltd: Melbourne.
- Manfield, Alice; introduction by Barrett, Charles, C.M.Z.S. (1924). The Lyre-Birds of Mount Buffalo. Robertson & Mullens: Melbourne
- Barrett, Charles. (1924) Bushland Babies Cornstalk Publishing Company 1924
- Barrett, Charles. (1931). The Weekly Times Wild Nature book. Herald and Weekly Times Ltd: Melbourne.
- Barrett, Charles. (1937). Koala. The story of Australia's native bear. Robertson & Mullens: Melbourne.
- Barrett, Charles. (1939). Koonwarra. A naturalist's adventures in Australia. Oxford University Press: London
- Barrett, Charles. (1941). Australia: My Country. Oxford University Press: Melbourne.
- Barrett, Charles. (1942). From a Bush Hut. Cassell & Co: Melbourne.
- Barrett, Charles. (1942). On the Wallaby. Quest and adventure in many lands. Robertson & Mullens: Melbourne.
- Barrett, Charles. (1943). Australian Wild Life. Georgian House: Melbourne.
- Barrett, Charles. (1943). Kangaroo and his Kin. Robertson & Mullens: Melbourne.
- Barrett, Charles. (1943). Up North. Australia above Capricorn. Robertson & Mullens: Melbourne.
- Barrett, Charles. (1944). Australian Caves, Cliffs and Waterfalls. Georgian House: Melbourne.
- Barrett, Charles. (1944). Australian Nature Wonders. Robertson & Mullens: Melbourne.
- Barrett, Charles. (1944). The Platypus. The world's wonder animal. Robertson & Mullens: Melbourne.
- Barrett, Charles. (1946). Coast of Adventure. Untamed north Australia. Robertson & Mullens: Melbourne.
- Barrett, Charles. (1946). The Bunyip, and other Mythical Monsters and Legends. Reed & Harris: Melbourne.
- Barrett, Charles. (1946). Wanderer's Rest. Cassell & Co: Melbourne.
- Barrett, Charles. (1949). Parrots of Australasia. N.H. Seward: Melbourne.
- Barrett, Charles. (1950). Reptiles of Australia. Cassell: Melbourne.
- Barrett, Charles. (1954). Wild Life of Australia and New Guinea. William Heinemann Ltd: Melbourne.
- Barrett, Charles; & Burns, Alex N. (1951). Butterflies of Australia and New Guinea. N.H. Seward: Melbourne.
