= Steven Lonergan =

Australian public servant and politician

Official Member of the Legislative Council
- In office 1952–1959
- Preceded by: Claude Champion

Government Secretary
- In office 1949–1955

Personal details
- Born: 29 March 1899 Hobart, Tasmania
- Died: June 1969 (aged 70) Sydney, Australia

Steven Ainsworth Lonergan (29 March 1899 – June 1969) was an Australian public servant, who spent most of his career in the Territory of Papua and New Guinea. He served in the Legislative Council from 1952 to 1959.

== Biography ==
Lonergan was born in Hobart in Tasmania in March 1899, and was educated at State High School in Launceston. He joined the Australian armed forces during World War I and saw action the Battle of Gallipoli aged only 16 and later in France, where he was badly injured. He then served in the Australian army headquarters in London. After the war he studied at the Repatriation Trades School in Launceston from 1920 to 1922, before joining the civil service in the Territory of New Guinea in 1923. He married Norfolk Islander Irene Mitchell in February 1929.

In 1940 he was appointed Assistant Government Secretary. During World War II he was part of the Australian New Guinea Administrative Unit, achieving the rank of lieutenant-colonel and was mentioned in dispatches. He became Acting Government Secretary in 1949, and in 1951 took on the role permanently. As a result, he was appointed to the Legislative Council in 1952.

The Secretary Department was scrapped in 1955 and Lonergan became Director of Civil Affairs. He was also Acting Assistant Administrator for five months in 1956–57. He retired in 1959 and returned to Australia. He died in Sydney in 1969, survived by his wife.
