= Komine (surname) =

Komine is a Japanese surname. Notable people with the surname include:

- Isokichi Komine (小嶺 磯吉; 1866–1934), Japanese-born Australian pearl diver and merchant
- Lisa Komine (小峰 理紗; born 1978), Japanese singer-songwriter
- Shane Komine (シェーン・コミネ; born 1980), American former baseball player
- Takayuki Komine (小峯 隆幸; born 1974), Japanese former footballer
