= Lackersteen & Co =

Australian condiment company

- Founded: January 1, 1857; 168 years ago in Sydney, Australia
- Founder: Augustus A. Lackersteen
- Products: Jams and condiments

Lackersteen & Co was a condiment importer in Sydney in 1857, and later became a jam and condiment manufacturer. When it was established by Augustus A. Lackersteen, the company initially simply imported curries, chutneys and preserves. It went bankrupt in 1870. It was later run by Lackersteen's son, Augustus Lacy Clive, and then changed focus from importing to production, they created tomato sauce, chutneys and preserves from local produce. Products including marmalade were made from harvested produce from their orchard in Gosford, which was later owned by Augustus Lacy's son, Archie Ernest Lackersteen. In 1879, Augustus Lacy claimed they were the only preserver of bottled fruits in the colony.

Augustus Alexander Lackersteen applied for trademark registration in Sydney in April 1867. On 18 April 1867, a fire broke out at the Reibey Cottage on 394 George Street, which adjoining the John Sands building. All of the Lackersteen stock was lost (reported as Lackerstein, sic). This was called 'Sands' fire', affecting the pickle merchant. In April 1917, the factory on Parramatta Road, Leichhardt, had a break-in where thieves used gelignite to open a safe. The contents, including £4 or £5 were stolen.

In 1922, their gazette listing noted their jam and condiment manufacturing as well as preserving and canning. Their capital was £25,000 in £1 shares with Augustus as the permanent managing director.

In 1935, Lackersteen's advertised in Nesca home hints and cookery, that their tomato sauce and marmalade had been in use by the public for 76 years (i.e. 1859). This same figure was used in newspaper advertising in 1940. This figure differed to the establishment date of 1857 as cited in an article in 1945.

In March 1944, Lackersteen & Co., Ltd, was purchased by The Producers' Co-operative Distributing Society, Ltd. (P.D.S), as a going concern. This was via a cash purchase of the shares, and made Lackersteen a P.D.S. subsidiary. In February 1945, the P.D.S. declared that it had nearly trebled the organisation's output, but could not meet all orders due to a bottle shortage.

In July 1945, the P.D.S. clarified that the organisation contracted 50 acres of land at Goolagong [sic] to grow vegetables including cauliflowers and onions. Previously, tomatoes were imported from other states. Plans were postponed to build a tomato pulping plant, but no canning factory was intended to be built.

The Glendowner mansion in Ryde was occupied by the Lackersteens in 1907 until it was demolished in 1964.

Branded Lackersteens [sic] marmalade was still being advertised for sale in May 1990. In 2002, John Newton's column review of marmalade noted that Lackersteens tinned 'Seville Orange marmalade since 1876' was available for sale in supermarkets.

== Products and processes ==
In 1879, Lackersteen hosted a stand at the Sydney International Exhibition, showing preserved tomatoes, bottled fruits, jams, pickles, spices and sauces. He had previously won first prize at various exhibitions between 1866 and 1877 for quality and the preparation of goods.

In 1913, Lackersteen's two sons managed an orchard, 'Tembani', near Gosford, which grew plums, peaches, oranges, lemons, passionfruit and tomatoes. In 1916, they cut down the passionfruit and replanted with Jonathan apples. Other fruits which continued were Wickson apples, Satsuma and Shiro plums.

In 1890, Lackersteen's Excelsior jam was sold in glass jars for 9d at F. Witherspoon in Honeysuckle Point. The Excelsior jams and marmalades continued to be advertised in 1893.

In 1919, Frank L. Lackersteen visited tomato-growers in the Hawkesbury district, and planned to establish a tomato pulping factory in Richmond. It was noted that the company had been doing business in the district for over 50 years (circa 1869). In March 1920, it was determined that it was not feasible to establish the factory due to difficulties in obtaining materials and machinery.

Lackersteen's tomato sauce was a well-known product line throughout Australia, and was described as preserved tomatoes in bottles on the 'French plan' (being only fruit pulp, with water evaporated). The tomatoes were purchased, as well as grown in Marrickville, along with the chillies for Cayenne pepper. In 1929, tomato sauce was sold for 9d a bottle by grocers Moran & Cato Ltd.

In 1929, their mint sauce was sold by the British New Guinea Development Company Ltd. in Papua New Guinea. In 1931, their marmalade and mint sauce were being sold by Burns Philp & Co. Ltd. in Port Moresby.

In 1933, after extensions to the plant of their Bathurst pulping factory, Lackersteen produced new lines of tinned apples (apple pulp and slice) and tinned preserved cauliflowers. These were in addition to existing products of tomato sauce, tomato soup, chutney, Worcestershire sauce, vinegar, preserved fruits and preserved olives. Further details of products from that year are listed in advertising by Reid and Fotheringham, Macksville. Their store was appointed as a distributor of Lackersteen lines including Seville orange marmalade (in jars and tins), tomato sauce, pure malt vinegar, Worcestershire sauce, mint sauce, and Spanish olives. Clarke famous Indian chutney, and sweet sliced chutney are also listed, but an 1893 advertisement clarifies that Lackersteen was the sole agent for the chutnee [sic] and curry powder products by Messrs. Clarke Son & Co. In 1934, Lackersteen exported both tomato sauce and tomato ketchup, plus many items listed above with the addition of tarragon vinegar and piccalilli (mustard pickles). In 1935, other products were clear mixed pickles and mustard pickles, as sold in Boans in Perth.

Lackersteen's mint sauce was sold in 1940 for 8d a bottle.

=== Packaging ===
In 1879, the jams were put in earthenware pots and tumblers, rather than tins, to avoid corrosion.

In September 1897, Lackersteen published a public notice that refilling their branded tomato sauce bottles was illegal and would result in prompt action. In 1964, a public notice stated that the branded bottles of companies including Lackersteen, remained as their property and were not authorised to be refilled, destroyed, damaged or used again for any purpose, but to be returned to the companies.

In 1899, the owner, Augustus Lacy Lackersteen, was involved in a legal case against William Peacock (trading as O.K. Jam Company) regarding their tomato sauce bottle packaging. The style of bottle resembled that of Lackersteen, which could mislead purchasers. The case resulted in an injunction. Examples of the brown stamped Lackersteen's bottles are in the collections of the City of Parramatta, the Sydney Quarantine Station Movable Heritage Collection, and the Western Australia Museum. In October 1985, the Macquarie University acquired an 1860 example of the Lackersteen tomato sauce bottle for their historical collection.
