= Swimming at the 1963 South Pacific Games =

Swimming at the 1963 South Pacific Games took place in Suva, the capital of Fiji. It was the first edition of the South Pacific Games and the race distances were in yards. There were fourteen events in total, eight for men and six for women. Three territories shared the medals; hosts Fiji won the largest number, with Papua New Guinea and New Caledonia in second and third place respectively.

== Medal summary ==
=== Medal table ===
Rank	Nation	Gold	Silver	Bronze	Total
1	Fiji	13	5	6	24
2	Papua and New Guinea	1	6	2	9
3	New Caledonia	0	3	5	8
Totals (3 entries)		14	14	13	41

==== Men's events ====
Event	Gold		Silver		Bronze	
110 yd freestyle	C. F. Bay (FIJ)	1:02.2	J. D. Griffiths (FIJ)	1:03.8	P. Kerrigan (FIJ)	1:04.2
440 yd freestyle	C. F. Bay (FIJ)	5:23.4	J. D. Griffiths (FIJ)	5:25.3	J. Y. Mamelin (NCL)	5:37
1650 yd freestyle	C. F. Bay (FIJ)	21:36.4	J. Y. Mamelin (NCL)	22:38.6	F. Caillard (NCL)	22:57.4
110 yd backstroke	C. M. Raddock (FIJ)	1:15.8	P. Postel (NCL)	1:18.8	M. Sau (FIJ)	1:20.3
220 yd breaststroke	S. Koroi (FIJ)	3:13.4	P. Kangon (P-NG)	3:18.8	D. Douceur (NCL)	3:27.5
110 yd butterfly	T. Jovel (P-NG)	1:16.4	K. Jarope (P-NG)	1:26.9	P. Postel (NCL)	1:29
4 × 110 yd freestyle relay	Fiji	4:21.6	New Caledonia	4:31.4	Papua and New Guinea	4:34.4
4 × 110 yd medley relay	Fiji	5:16.2	Papua and New Guinea	5:19.7	New Caledonia	5:28.7

==== Women's events ====
Event	Gold		Silver		Bronze	
110 yd freestyle	A. Ramedi (FIJ)	1:27.6	S. Matthews (FIJ)	1:16	C. S. Anfinson (FIJ)	1:16.8
440 yd freestyle	J. E. Herrington (FIJ)	6:01	S. Matthews (P-NG)	6:05.3	C. S. Anfinson (FIJ)	6:16.6
110 yd backstroke	W. Adi (FIJ)	1:27.6	J. Finn (P-NG)	1:31.5	J. M. Blyth (FIJ)	1:31.9
110 yd breaststroke	M. L. Smith (FIJ)	1:39.6	W. Ralvuni (FIJ)	1:40.7	J. E. Herrington (FIJ)	1:41.2
220 yd breaststroke	J. E. Herrington (FIJ)	3:33.8	M. L. Smith (FIJ)	3:37.3	P. Mae (P-NG)	3:45.0
4 × 110 yd freestyle relay	Fiji	5:17.4	Papua and New Guinea	5:20.3	n/a	–
3 × 110 yd medley relay – bk/br/fs (No medals awarded)	Fiji	4:20.7	Papua and New Guinea	4:37	n/a	–
