= Carl Jacobson =

Carl Jacobson may refer to:

- Carl Ingold Jacobson (1877–1960), member of the Los Angeles City Council
- Carl Jacobson (Minnesota politician) (born 1969), member of the Minnesota House of Representatives

== See also ==
- Carl Jacobsen, Danish brewer, art collector and philanthropist
- Carl Jacobsen (politician), member of the Legislative Council of Papua and New Guinea
- Carl Jakobsson, ice hockey player
