= George Whittaker (Papua New Guinean politician) =

Member of the Legislative Council
- In office 1954–1957
- Constituency: New Guinea Mainland

Personal details
- Born: 16 January 1904 Chillagoe, Australia
- Died: 25 June 1964 (aged 60) Goroka, Papua and New Guinea

George Kenneth Whittaker MBE (16 January 1904 – 25 June 1964) was an Australian optometrist, planter, soldier and politician in Papua New Guinea.

== Biography ==
Whittaker was born in Chillagoe, Queensland and attended high school in Cairns. After studying at the University of Sydney, he moved to the Territory of New Guinea in 1925 to work for the Department of Public Health as a medical assistant. He married Josephine Hogan in 1929; the couple had a son named Vivian. He led the first medical patrol into the New Guinea Highlands in 1933, before establishing a cocoa plantation near Lae, where he also started working as an optometrist in 1936.

During World War II he served in the New Guinea Volunteer Rifles, reaching the rank of captain. He was mentioned in dispatches in 1943 and awarded an MBE. After being discharged from the Army, he worked at the Awilunga cocoa plantation, and served as President of the territory's Returned and Services League branch from 1951 until 1955. He was also awarded the Queen's Coronation Medal.

In 1954 he was elected to the Legislative Council from the New Guinea Mainland seat, serving a single term before retiring from the Council at the 1957 elections. He also sat on Lae Town Advisory Council and Morobe District Advisory Council.

After retiring in 1957, Whittaker moved back to Australia, although he subsequently travelled to Papua and New Guinea several times to carry out optometry work. He died in the territory at Goroka in 1964.
