= Bert Jones (public servant) =

Official Member of the Legislative Council
- In office 1951–1953
- Succeeded by: Alan Roberts

Personal details
- Died: 8 November 1977 (aged 82)

John Herbert Jones (died 8 November 1977) was an Australian public servant. He spent most of his career in Papua and New Guinea, serving as an official member of the Legislative Council between 1951 and 1953.

== Biography ==
Jones joined the civil service of the Territory of New Guinea in 1921. He became District Commissioner of Sepik District and later held the same role in Madang. Following the Japanese invasion he helped evacuate the civilian population and then became a coastwatcher for four months. After leaving his post, he walked over five hundred kilometres from Wewak to Wau. He subsequently served as a colonel in the Australian New Guinea Administrative Unit. During the war he met Edna Kaye in Port Moresby, who he later married.

Following the war, he was appointed Director of District Services and Native Affairs. Between 1949 and 1951 he was Acting Secretary for Planning and Development, before returning to his previous role. He was appointed to the Legislative Council following the 1951 elections. He resigned in 1953 when he joined the Australian Department of Territories, becoming Australia's representative at the United Nations Trusteeship Council.

He died on 8 November 1977 at the age of 82.
