= Rachel Cleland =

Australian activist

Dame Rachel Cleland, DBE (née Evans; 19 January 1906 – 18 April 2002) was an Australian expatriate community and social welfare worker in Papua New Guinea.

== Career ==
Born in Perth, Western Australia in 1906, the eldest of six children, Rachel Evans Cleland lived an active life which was centred on politics and community organisations. She was a niece of the West Australian feminist, Bessie Rischbieth. Cleland's background and her later training and work as a kindergarten teacher stood her in good stead for the expatriate life she eventually embarked on in Papua New Guinea.

Her husband, Sir Donald Cleland, was Administrator of Papua New Guinea from 1951 until 1966. He was a founding member of the Australian Liberal Party.

Rachel Cleland contributed to organisations such as the Red Cross, Girl Guides Association of Papua New Guinea, Country Women's Association, and Young Women's Christian Association (YWCA) as well as the integral role she played in establishing pre-schools throughout Papua New Guinea.

Sir Donald died in 1975, two weeks before Papua New Guinea's independence ceremonies. Rachel stayed for many years, her book Papua New Guinea: Pathways to Independence being published in 1983, before eventually returning to Australia near the end of her life.

In her later years Dame Rachel was very vocal on her opposition to the logging of old-growth forests. By then she had lived in Papua New Guinea for 27 years. She continued to make trips from Australia to Papua New Guinea for most of the rest of her life, making a total of eight visits between 1979 and 2000.

== Honours ==
Rachel Cleland was appointed as a Member of the Order of the British Empire (MBE) in 1959 and a Commander of the Order (CBE) in 1966 for her work with women and children.

In 1980, Cleland became the first western woman to be appointed a Dame Commander of the Order of the British Empire (DBE) by the government of Papua New Guinea for services to the country she had lived in for so much of her adult life.

She was honoured for the volunteer work she did for many Papua New Guinea organisations and for helping involve women in public affairs.

== Death ==
Dame Rachel Cleland died peacefully in Goondiwindi, Queensland, aged 96, on 18 April 2002, after a heart attack. She had only a week earlier moved there from Perth to be near her son, Evan, and his family.

== Quotes ==
"I enjoy now whatever is happening - my idea is you can't enjoy tomorrow, and you can only enjoy yesterday if you are enjoying today." (R. Cleland)
