= Douglas Macinnis =

Australian public servant

Official Member of the Legislative Council of Papua and New Guinea
- In office 1953–1964

Official Member of the Northern Territory Legislative Council
- In office 1951–1952

Personal details
- Born: 28 June 1903; Crookwell, Australia
- Died: 22 October 1982 (aged 79); Gold Coast, Australia

Douglas Evan Macinnis OBE (28 June 1903 – 22 October 1982) was an Australian public servant. He was a member of the Northern Territory Legislative Council and Legislative Council of Papua and New Guinea.

== Biography ==
Macinnis was born in Crookwell, New South Wales in 1903. After studying at the University of Sydney and earning an LLB, he worked in agriculture in New South Wales, Northern Territory and Queensland between 1927 and 1939. He was admitted to the bar in New South Wales in 1938. During World War II he served in the Australian Imperial Force, rising to the rank of lieutenant colonel.

After returning to the University of Sydney to study at its law school from 1946 to 1947, he joined the Lands Department of Northern Territory. After a brief spell working in the Crown Law Office in Darwin in 1950 and 1951, he was appointed Assistant Director of Lands and Surveys in the territory, also becoming a member of its Legislative Council.

In 1952 he was appointed Director of Lands, Surveys and Mines in the Territory of Papua and New Guinea, becoming a member of the Legislative Council the following year. He also served on the Executive Council, and was admitted to the bar in the territory in 1959. He was made an OBE in the 1960 New Year Honours. In 1964 he returned to Australia, joining the Legal Branch of the Mines Department of New South Wales.

He died in Gold Coast in Queensland in October 1982 following a long illness.
