= John Chipper =

British politician

Member of the Legislative Council
- In office 1961–1964
- Constituency: New Britain
- In office 1959
- Preceded by: Dudley Jones
- Succeeded by: Don Barrett
- Constituency: New Guinea Islands

Personal details
- Born: 1910; United Kingdom
- Died: 28 April 1980 (aged 69); Rabaul, Papua New Guinea

John Lester Chipper (1910 – 28 April 1980) was an English-born Papua New Guinean businessman and politician. He served in the Legislative Council in two spells between 1959 and 1964 and headed the local council of Rabaul for several years.

== Biography ==
Born in England in 1910, Chipper emigrated to Australia as a young man. In 1932 he moved to the Territory of New Guinea to join the gold rush, working in Bulolo, Maprik and Wau. During World War II he joined the Z Special Unit, serving in the southwest Pacific and Timor. Following the war he went into business in Rabaul, initially salvaging materials left over from the war. He expanded into building, engineering, finance, haulage, logging, milling, planting, property development and vehicle sales, and became president of the Planters and Traders’ Association of New Guinea.

He entered politics after being appointed to the Town Advisory Board of Rabaul in 1951. In 1959 all three elected members of the Legislative Council resigned in protest over the introduction of income tax. In the subsequent by-elections on 12 September, Chipper ran for the New Guinea Islands seat as a Taxpayers' Association candidate, pledging to also resign in protest if he was elected. He was duly elected with 87% of the vote and then resigned on 29 September.

Following the expansion of the Legislative Council, he contested the New Britain seat in the 1961 elections, defeating the incumbent Don Barrett. He did not stand for re-election in the 1964 elections. However, he continued in local politics, spending 29 years on the Town Advisory Council and its successor bodies, Rabaul Town Council and Rabaul Community Government. When Papua New Guinea became independent in 1975, he took citizenship of the new state, and served as president of the Town Council for eight years until it was converted into a Community Government in March 1980. He was then elected president of the new council.

On 28 April 1980 he suffered a heart attack while making a dawn patrol of Rabaul and died in Nonga hospital later the same day.
