= Carl Jacobsen (politician) =

Papua New Guinean politician (1895–1962)

Member of the Legislative Council
- In office 1951–1954
- Constituency: New Guinea Mainland

Personal details
- Born: Carl Mallesch Jacobsen; 8 February 1895; Beechworth, Victoria
- Died: 8 April 1962 (aged 67); Lae, Papua New Guinea
- Occupation: Farmer

Carl Mallesch Jacobsen (8 February 1895 – 25 April 1962) was an Australian-born politician and farmer who served as a member of the Legislative Council of Papua and New Guinea between 1951 and 1954.

== Biography ==
Born in Beechworth, Victoria, in 1895, Jacobsen moved to the Territory of New Guinea in 1932, initially working at the Bulolo Gold Dredging company. After two years, he took over a farm near Lae. When World War II started he joined the New Guinea Volunteer Rifles, from which he was seconded to the Fifth Air Force of the United States.

When the war ended, he worked at the Red Cross prisoner of war reception centre in Darwin, Northern Territory, before returning to Lae. He sold his Bulae farm and started a new one named Leiwomba. He was also a mason, serving as first Worshipful Master in the Lae Masonic Lodge, as well as serving as the first president of Lae Bowling Club.

Elections to the Papua and New Guinea Legislative Council were held for the first time in 1951. Jacobsen contested the New Guinea Mainland seat and was elected to the new legislature. He did not stand for re-election in the 1954 elections.

Jacobsen died in Lae in April 1962 at the age of 67.
