= Ernest James (politician) =

Member of the Legislative Council
- In office 1951–1959
- Succeeded by: Vincent Sanders
- Constituency: Papua

Personal details
- Born: 1 November 1893 London, United Kingdom
- Died: December 1963 (aged 70) Brisbane, Australia

Ernest Alfred James (1 November 1893 – December 1963) was an accountant, newspaper proprietor and politician in the Territory of Papua New Guinea. He served as a member of the Legislative Council between 1951 and 1959.

== Biography ==
James was born in London, where he studied to become an accountant. After earning his certification, he joined the Treasury of the Territory of Papua in 1915, also becoming a special constable. He married Vera Bussell in 1919, with whom he had a daughter. In 1924 he left the civil service to set up his own accountancy practice. In the same year he took over The Papua Courier newspaper, becoming its editor. In 1925 he was amongst the founders of the Port Moresby Chamber of Commerce, serving as its Honorary Secretary.

The European population of the territory was evacuated in December 1941 and January 1942 due to World War II. When they returned in 1945, the printing press had been destroyed and the newspaper was discontinued. After returning, he served for two years as the Deputy Controller of the War Damage Commission.

Having agitated for elected representation in the Courier since the 1920s, James contested the first elections to the Legislative Council in 1951, winning the Papua seat. The following year he became Chairman of Port Moresby Town Advisory Council. He was returned unopposed in the 1954 elections. Following the death of his first wife, in 1955 he married May Ross. James went on to defeat Craig Kirke in the 1957 elections. However, in June 1959, he and the two other elected members resigned from the council in protest at the introduction of income tax in the territory.

He later retired to the Yeronga area of Brisbane in Australia, where he died at home in December 1963 at the age of 70.
