= William Groves (educator) =

Australian educator and public servant

Director of Education of Papua and New Guinea
- In office 1946–1958
- Succeeded by: Geoffrey Roscoe

Member of the Legislative Council of Papua and New Guinea
- In office 1951–1958
- Succeeded by: Geoffrey Roscoe

Director of Education of Nauru
- In office 1937–1938

Personal details
- Born: 18 August 1898; Ballarat, Victoria
- Died: 11 July 1967 (aged 68); London, United Kingdom

William Charles Groves (18 August 1898 – 11 July 1967) was an Australian educator and public servant. He served as Director of Education in Nauru and Papua and New Guinea between 1937 and 1958. He was also a member of the Legislative Council of Papua and New Guinea from 1951 to 1958.

== Biography ==
Groves was born in Ballarat in Victoria in 1898 to William Charles Groves and Sarah Groves (née Gribble). After matriculating at Ballarat High School, he began work as a teacher for the Victorian Education Department. He joined the Australian army in 1915, and was made a sergeant in August 1916, becoming the youngest-ever sergeant in the Australian military. He served in Egypt and France with the 14th Battalion, and taken as a prisoner of war at Riencourt in 1917.

After returning to Australia in 1919, he rejoined the Victorian Education Department. In 1922 he was seconded to the Territory of New Guinea, where he taught in schools in Kokopo and Malaguna. He married Doris Kathleen Frances Smith, a fellow teacher, in 1925. The couple had four children; one son and three daughters. He subsequently returned to Australia, and in 1927 began lecturing Melbourne Teachers' College. He studied part-time and earned a BA from the University of Melbourne in 1928, and later completed a course in social anthropology at the University of Sydney.

Between 1932 and 1934, Groves worked in New Guinea as part of a research fellowship for the Australian National Research Council. In 1934, he was elected a fellow of the Royal Anthropological Institute of Great Britain and Ireland. He returned to the territory on another research assignment in 1936, and the following year was appointed Director of Education for Nauru. He remained in Nauru until 1938, before carrying out work surveying educational needs in the Solomon Islands in 1939 and 1940. He then returned to New Guinea and joined the Australian Army Reserve in June 1941. In December 1942 he transferred to the Second Australian Imperial Force, joining the Army Education Unit. At the end of the war he was appointed Director of Education for the Territory, also helping to re-establish the local scout movement. He joined the Executive Council of the territory in 1949, Following the 1951 elections, he was appointed to the Legislative Council as an official member.

After retiring in 1958, he became a researcher for the Australian National University and the Victorian Education Department, as well as lecturing at Burwood Teachers' College. He died in London in July 1967 during a trip to Europe.
