= Kiap =

Patrol officers in pre-independence Papua New Guinea

Kiaps, known formally as district officers and patrol officers, were travelling representatives of the British and Australian governments with wide-ranging authority, in pre-independence Papua New Guinea.

== Etymology ==
'Kiap' is a Papua New Guinean creole (Tok Pisin) word derived from the German word Kapitän (Captain).

== Role ==
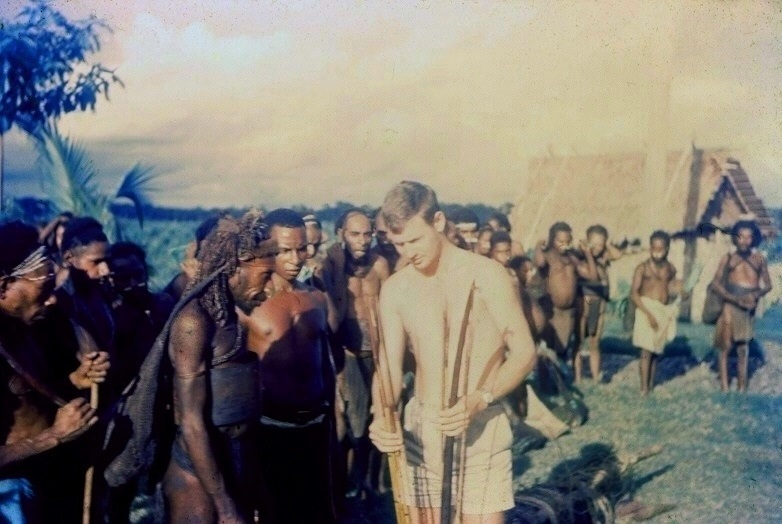
Patrol Officer (Kiap), Christopher Viner-Smith, in 1964, examines weapons carried by men of the Biami people, during a patrol to investigate the earlier theft of some steel in a Biami raid on a government patrol post.

The role of the kiap changed as Papua New Guinea changed. The more primitive the conditions the more wide-ranging were the duties, and the more decision making power was granted. "The kiap, for example, is district administrator, commissioned policeman, magistrate, gaoler: if he is in a remote area he may well be engineer, surveyor, medical officer, dentist, lawyer, and agricultural adviser. The kiap system grew out of necessity and the demands made by poor communications in impossible country: the man on the spot had to have power to make the decision."

Under Australian administration the kiap was a one-man representative of the government, taking on political education, policing and judicial roles as well as more mundane tasks such as completing censuses. The kiaps were commissioned as officers of the Royal Papua New Guinea Constabulary and as such, members of the overseas serving police. They were appointed as district magistrates.

During the 1960s, some kiaps became more like a magistrate, moving away from law enforcement. Others specialised in setting up local and provincial governments.

== History ==
With over 800 languages spoken among a population of just over six million people [in 2009], PNG is one of the most socio-linguistically diverse countries in the world.

— Dinnen & Braithwaite (2009)

Soon after the establishment of British New Guinea in the 1880s, a system of patrols was established to expand the government's administrative control beyond the major towns. The system continued after the change from British to Australian administration in 1905.

The kiaps patrolled at a time when cannibalism was still practiced in parts of PNG. Violent intertribal conflict occurred frequently.

When Patrol Officer (Kiap) Jim Taylor and prospector Mick Leahy, with eighty police and carriers, first entered the Wahgi Valley in March 1933, the Australians were thought to be ghosts. Later in the same year, a number of indigenous people in the valley were killed, after a misunderstanding, and in 1935 there were further indigenous deaths, during an intervention between fighting groups, and the deaths of two white missionaries. First contacts were fraught with misunderstandings and the potential for violence.

"In the early years, there were relatively few kiaps scattered across vast tracts of land. At the height of Australia's pre-war administration in 1938, a total field staff of 150 men existed to govern three-quarters of a million people, while a similar number of people lay beyond official government control."

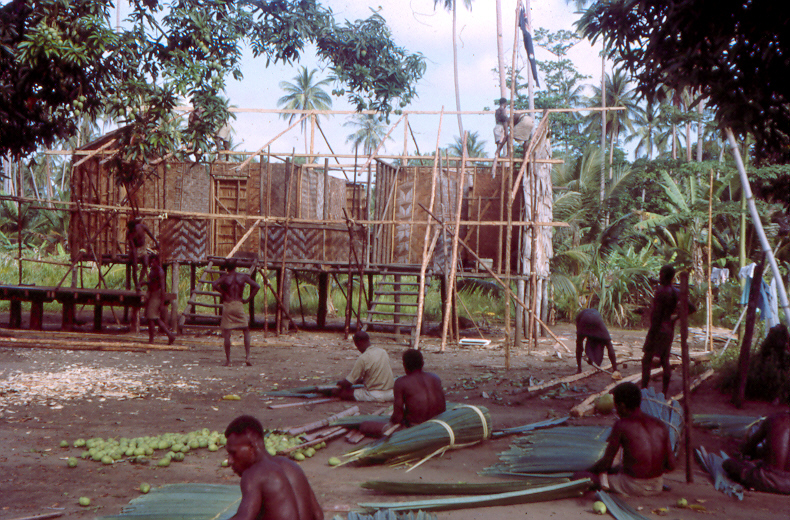
Offices and accommodation for police, at Afore patrol post, being constructed by local indigenous men under the supervision of Australian kiaps in 1964.

Before World War II kiaps had been required to attend Sydney University for lectures in law, anthropology and tropical medicine. During the 1950s, kiaps with field experience could qualify to become district officers by sitting for an examination at the Australian School of Pacific Administration (ASOPA), where they studied law, anthropology, Pacific history, comparative constitutional development, and administration.

"When I became Minister [of the Department of Territories, in 1951], I was shown maps on which parts of the territory were marked as 'controlled areas' or 'uncontrolled areas'... the meaning of control in its barest essentials was that an area had been penetrated by Administration patrols, contact had been made with most of the people in the area, a number of patrol posts had been set up as points of continuing contact, the people had been roughly enumerated and made familiar with the basic idea of law and order, namely that they should not kill each other, that they should take their disputes to the white officer of the Administration to be settled, and that they should respect government authority."

— Sir Paul Hasluck

Kiaps provided "pacification, medical aid, and administration to some 11,920 villages" in rugged and almost impenetrable terrain. "The kiap system [...] appointed to each village a luluai, through whom control was administered, and in Papua a village constable. "The 'pay-back killing had to be stopped before peace could come". Before that every death was avenged by another death, in an unending vendetta. Gradually, revenge by the individual was replaced with punishment by the state, and compensation to the family of the victim.

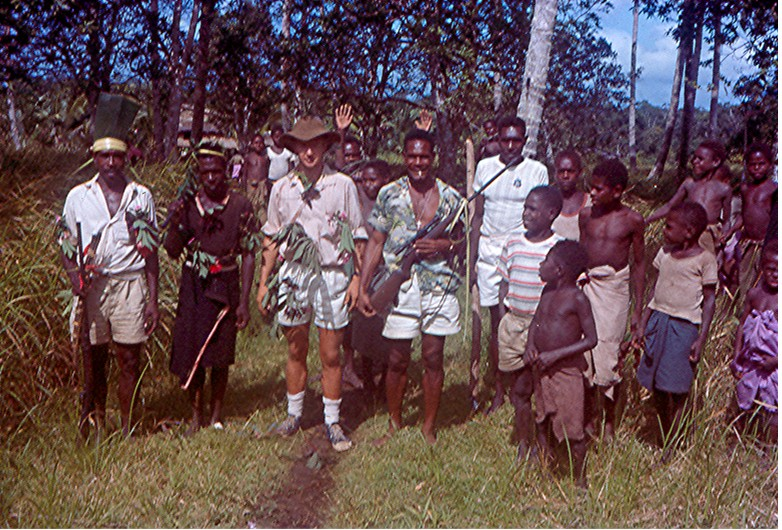
Chris Viner-Smith leaving KIBULI Village 6 June 1963 – Oriomo-Bituri Patrol – Western District –Territory of PNG.

In 1954 Patrol Officer Gerald Leo Szarka was murdered with an axe by local people. Szarka had been trying to call people together to conduct a census. Other kiaps were also murdered while carrying out their duties. Kiaps were required to collect a poll tax in remote villages from people who mostly had no money. These taxes were much resented by the village people, who had always been self-sufficient.

Only in 1963 were the last remote areas of PNG officially declared to be under government control. But by 1969, the wide-ranging powers of the kiap were being questioned, and petitions were being signed for the removal of individual kiaps.

From 1949 until 1974, "the best estimate of how many men served in these roles [was] around 2,000." Papua New Guinea became an independent nation in 1975.

In 1979, it would be stated "The kiap system has declined rapidly in influence since independence. This was perhaps inevitable, as the system was never meant to cope with free citizens in an independent democracy."

A former World War II Field Marshal and Governor-General of Australia, Viscount Slim, said of the kiaps: "Your young chaps in New Guinea have gone out where I would never have gone without a battalion and they have done on their own by sheer force of character what I could only do with troops. I don't think there has been anything like it in the modern world".

== Indigenous perspective ==
=== August Kituai ===
August Ibrum K. Kituai, one of the early indigenous historians of PNG, has written "a study of the close encounters and entanglements which occurred when colonial regimes used indigenous people as agents of colonialism". Kituai "emphasises that orders and administration regulations were often not followed as native police did what they thought best, or to their own advantage" and "raises a number of unresolved issues about the pervasiveness of the Australian-led "civilising" administration, the extent of authority exercised by Kiaps over their men, and historiographically over the veracity of his informants' evidence".

Kituai "[peels] back of the veneer of Kiap authority, hierarchical command and so-called peaceful penetration which has underlined much of the earlier patrolling history of Papua New Guinea. My gun, my brother reveals a history of opportunism, property destruction, sexual predation and personal tragedy that highlights how the unofficial and unregulated underside of colonialism affected people's lives and created today's new nations".

=== Anyan of the Tairora people ===
Virginia and James Watson were anthropologists in the Central Highlands of Papua New Guinea during the 1950s and 1960s. A local woman, Anyan, became Virginia Watson's interpreter. Anyan had been chosen by her family "to go live in the government station of Kainantu in order to learn Tok Pisin and thus be able to act as a translator for her relatives and other villagers". Subsequently, Virginia Watson asked permission from Anyan to write her story, using her field notes, in the form of a book:

One time when the kiap came to get us we all ran away from the village as fast as we could. I was still a young girl then. I ran as fast and as far as I could and then I hid among some reeds in low ground. But my feet were not completely hidden and a policeman came by and saw them. He grabbed me by the arm and pulled me out to see if I was a girl or boy. When he saw I was a girl he took me to the house where they were keeping all of the people they caught. If I had been a boy I would have been shot. That time when the kiap came after us ten men and two boys were shot. This was one time in my life when I was most frightened. (pp.51-52)

Later "Anyan decided the benefits of the colonial administration outweighed many of her earlier fears." She married and lived in Kainantu, close to medical and educational facilities.

=== Kiap courts ===
"Not many Papua New Guineans were ever found innocent in a kiap's court—never as many as 10 percent in any year for which records... are available"..."the law has been administered only intermittently in most indigenous communities, and then in what has often seemed to be an arbitrary manner in the eyes of many villagers" (Wolfers, 1975)

== Recognition from the Australian government ==
In July 2013, after eleven years of lobbying the Australian Government, forty-nine ex-Kiaps were presented with the Police Overseas Service Medal at Parliament House in Canberra by the Hon. Jason Clare MHR, Minister for Home Affairs and Justice and the Australian Federal Police Commissioner Tony Negus APM.

During the ceremony, which celebrated the work of the kiaps between 1949 and 1973, Minister Clare said, "Being a Kiap meant you were an ambassador, a police officer, an explorer, a farmer, an engineer and an anthropologist – all in one". He acknowledged that kiaps were often on call twenty-four hours, seven days a week, in remote areas in a role that "demanded perseverance, tenacity and commitment". He continued, "today we are righting a wrong. We are recognising men that should have properly recognised many years ago."

Minister Clare, during an earlier parliamentary debate of the Bill, which enabled the award of medals for service, said, "The Kiaps were an extraordinary group of young Australians who performed a remarkable service for the people of PNG. They were some of our nation's finest."

== See also ==
- Papua New Guinea
- Royal Papua New Guinea Constabulary
