= Isokichi Komine =

Pioneer in New Guinea of Japanese origin

Komine
- Born: 1866 or 1867; Shimabara, Nagasaki, Shimabara Domain, Tokugawa Shogunate
- Died: 3 October 1934 (aged 66 or 67)
- Citizenship: Australian
- Occupations: Pearl diver Businessperson

Isokichi Komine (1866 (Note: Another source says 1867. See "Early life" section.) – 3 October 1934) was a Japanese pearl diver, merchant, and trader in present-day Papua New Guinea. He arrived in German New Guinea in the early 20th century, amassing significant business interests which he maintained after the colony's captured by Australian forces and reconstitution as the Territory of New Guinea. He was a leader of the Japanese community in Rabaul.

== Early life ==
"[O]ne of Rabaul's oldest pioneers", Komine was born in 1866 or 1867, in Shimabara, Nagasaki, Japan. First working as a factory worker in Korea, he had already begun voyaging New Guinea's seas in the 1890s and first settled at Thursday Island, Queensland. An emigrant of Japan, Komine was the first recorded Japanese presence in German New Guinea; he arrived there in 1901 or 1902, after being denied permanent residency in British New Guinea.

== Career and death ==
Komine is said to be "the most famous Japanese resident in the region [German New Guinea] of that time". A Japanese community leader in German New Guinea, Komine set up Nanyō Sangyō Kaisha, an independent business, there, and employed up over a hundred Japanese workers. An extensive collection of Komine's rare finds in his voyages comprised more than 3,000 "valuables", although it was noted that a few gold-lip ouster shells in his collection were only worth up to $5. The collection was sold in October 1910 to A. B. Lewis, and is considered to be the largest single purchase of items from the Bismarck Archipelago, which was where Komine resided in from 1902. When Japan declared war against Germany in 1914, Komine aligned with the Australians but also maintained close ties with German businesspeople to safeguard his business interests. Komine died on 3 October 1934 of food poisoning, although one report claims that Komine "outlived his obituary notice" and was still alive after 1934.

== See also ==
- Japanese settlement in Papua New Guinea
