= Ern James =

Australian rules footballer

Personal information
- Full name: Ernest William James
- Born: 26 October 1883; Port Adelaide, South Australia
- Died: 25 August 1973 (aged 89); Geelong, Victoria

Playing career^{1}
Years	Club	Games (Goals)
1905–06	Geelong	7 (4)
- ^{1} Playing statistics correct to the end of 1906.

Ernest William James (26 October 1883 – 25 August 1973) was an Australian rules footballer who played with Geelong in the Victorian Football League (VFL).
