= Copra plantations in New Guinea =

Coconut kernel cultivation since German colonisation

Copra plantations in New Guinea have been cultivated since the late 19th century, originally by German colonialists. They were continued by Australian interests following World War I.

Copra is the fourth most significant agriculture cash crop of PNG. An estimated 2.6 million people are engaged in coconut activities in PNG to either generate income and/or as food to supplement their livelihoods.

== Early colonialists ==
In 1884, German settlers arrived in eastern New Guinea (now part of Papua New Guinea), who planted Coconut palms (Cocos nucifera) for the production of copra, the dried flesh of the coconut. They established the colony of German New Guinea in the north eastern quarter of the island and numerous coconut plantations around coastal areas. They were afraid of venturing too far inland. To counter the growing German presence in the region, the Australian state of Queensland established the Territory of Papua as a de facto possession covering approximately the south east third of the island. Both the Queensland and German plantations thrived, providing opulent living conditions for the expatriates. Grand mansions were built on the plantations, complete with luxury furnishings. Much of the labour was performed by New Guinea natives. The towns of Port Moresby and Rabaul were founded as a result of the economic activity surrounding the plantations.

At the start of the First World War, in 1914, Australia sent a small military force to take over the German possessions in the South Pacific. Two Germans were killed in the process, while the remaining German plantation owners were initially sent back to work on their plantations. The 1919 Treaty of Versailles saw Germany lose all its overseas possessions, including German New Guinea, which became the Territory of New Guinea, a League of Nations mandate Territory under Australian administration.

The property of German planters was expropriated in the 1920s, and the coconut plantations were offered for sale to returning soldiers, many financed by the large trading companies which would manage the plantations.

== Recent history ==
By the 1980s, copra production in New Guinea was dominated by two Australian trading companies: Burns Philp and W. R. Carpenter & Co.

In 1985 the PNG government established the Copra Marketing Board, to take over copra production in PNG. The Board saw the virtual decimation of the copra industry in PNG, which was ruined by American soy beans in the late 1980s. Copra exports fell to negligible levels by 2004. According to the PNG Central Bank, the PNG’s copra exports in 2003 were 3,600 tons, levels at which copra exports could be said to be close to extinction. Exports rose to more than 9,100 tons in 2004.

In 1993, Kokonas Industri Koporasen (KIK) built a copra mill in Madang and effectively gained monopoly control over the marketing of PNG copra. In 2003 the government ended KIK’s monopoly powers over marketing. A year later KIK suffered losses that forced the group to call in liquidator, PNG Coconut Commodities, Rex Paki, who in April 2004, sold the Manang mill to Australian-owned Coconut Oil Production Madang Ltd (COPM, owned by Donald Brownlie Fleming) for K7.8 million (US$2.4 million).

The country’s only other coconut mill is owned by the Carpenter Group located in Rabaul.

== See also ==
- Agriculture in Papua New Guinea
- Economy of Papua New Guinea
