= Doris Booth =

(1895-1970) Australian nursing volunteer and goldminer

Doris Booth OBE
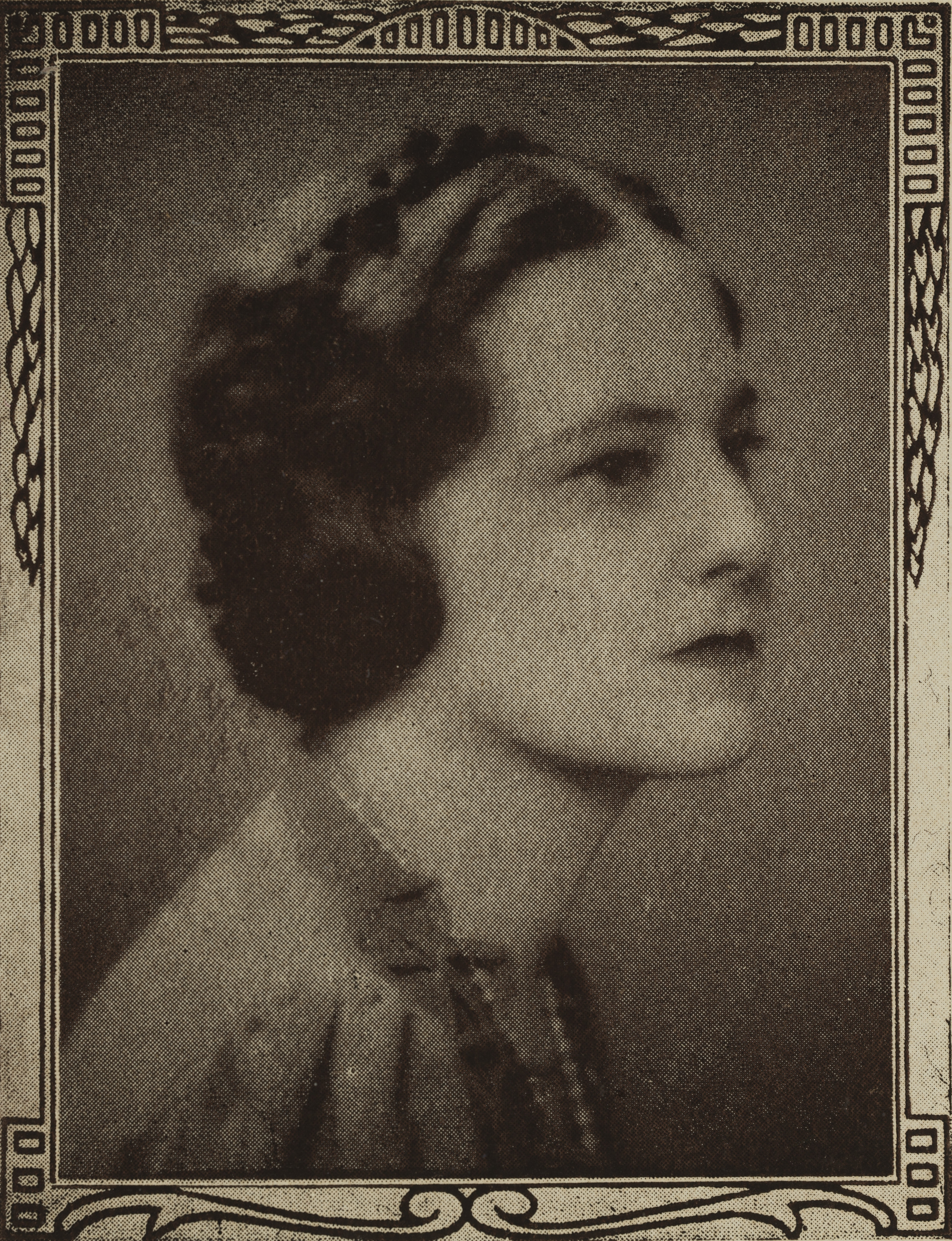
- Booth in 1939

Nominated Member of the Legislative Council
- In office 1951–1957

Personal details
- Born: 1 October 1895 Brisbane, Queensland
- Died: 4 November 1970 (aged 75) Brisbane, Australia
- Profession: Nurse, miner

Doris Regina Booth OBE (1 October 1895 – 4 November 1970) was an Australian nurse and goldminer. She was the first female member of the Legislative Council of Papua and New Guinea.

== Biography ==
Booth was born to Henry Wilde and Minna Gerler in South Brisbane in 1895. Following her school education she started work at Brisbane General Hospital as a trainee nurse. She left her job after marrying Charles Booth on 14 May 1919. The couple lived in Mitchell for a year, after which they moved to the Territory of New Guinea when her husband was appointed manager of a plantation near Kokopo.

In 1924 Booth and her husband moved to Bulolo to prospect for gold. After securing a lease, Booth ran it whilst her husband started prospecting at Edie Creek. She set up a bush hospital in September 1926 following a dysentery epidemic, running it until January 1927; this led to her being appointed an OBE in the 1929 Birthday Honours. Between 1927 and 1929 Booth returned to live in Australia to recover from Malaria, publishing a book about her experiences under the title Mountain Gold and Cannibals. She then went back to New Guinea and left her husband in 1932; the two divorced in 1934.

After a successful spell running a mine, Booth returned to Brisbane again in 1938 and worked for the Mothercraft Association. She subsequently returned to New Guinea and was appointed to the new Legislative Council of Papua and New Guinea in 1951, serving as its sole female member until 1957.

In 1960 Booth returned to Australia and worked as a volunteer for the Methodist Blue Nursing Service. She died at the St Andrews War Memorial Hospital in 1970.
