= British New Guinea Development Company =

The British New Guinea Development Company was a company registered in London, England on 11 February 1910. It was formed to acquire and profit from lands, rights, and options in British New Guinea and surrounding islands. The company went into voluntary liquidation to form a new company in 1922.
