= Jack Keith Murray =

Australian army officer (1889-1979)

Colonel His Honour (Note: His Honour was a prefix title given to Jack Murray upon his status as an Administrator of an external Australian territory. Consequently, The Honourable is a courtesy title retained for life for a former administrator.) Sir Jack Keith Murray KBE, ED
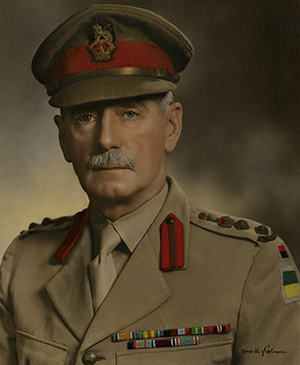
- Murray in military uniform.

Administrator of Papua and New Guinea
- In office 11 October 1945 – 5 June 1952
- Monarchs: George VI; Elizabeth II
- Governors General: Prince Henry, Duke of Gloucester; William McKell
- Prime Minister: Ben Chifley; Robert Menzies
- Preceded by: Basil Morris
- Succeeded by: Donald Cleland

Personal details
- Born: Jack Keith Murray; 8 February 1889 Middle Brighton, Colony of Victoria
- Died: 10 December 1979 (aged 90) Brisbane, Queensland, Australia
- Resting place: West Chapel, Mount Gravatt, Queensland
- Citizenship: British; Australian
- Spouse: Evelyn Andrews (Note: Her full name was, Evelyn Ernestine Pritchard Andrews.) (m. 1924)
- Parent: E. M. Murray (mother)
- Education: St Joseph's College, Hunters Hill
- Alma mater: University of Queensland (ScD) (Note: Honorary degree); Hawkesbury Agricultural College; University of Sydney (AS, BA)
- Occupation: Agriculturist; Military Officer; Administrator
- Civilian awards: Knight Commander of the Order of the British Empire

Military service
- Allegiance: Australia
- Branch/service: Australian Army
- Years of service: 1916–1918; 1935–1945
- Rank: Colonel
- Unit: Australian Army Veterinary Corps
- Commands: 25th Battalion, Darling Downs Regiment
- Battles/wars: First World War; Second World War
- Military awards: Efficiency Decoration

Sir Jack Keith Murray, KBE, ED (8 February 1889 – 10 December 1979), often cited as J. K. Murray, was an Australian colonial administrator, army officer, and educator. He was Administrator of the Australian Territory of Papua and New Guinea, and foundation Professor of Agriculture at the Queensland Agricultural College (now University of Queensland, Gatton campus).

== Early life ==
Jack Keith Murray was born on 8 February 1889 in Middle Brighton, Melbourne, Victoria. His parents' marriage ended when he was 2 and his mother moved to Sydney with him, working to find the fees to pay his attendance at St Joseph's College, Hunters Hill in 1904.

Murray enrolled at the University of Sydney in 1908, and after serving two years as an agricultural cadet at Cowra, he completed his Bachelor of Science in Agriculture in 1914 and Bachelor of Arts in 1915. He enlisted in the Australian Imperial Force in 1916 and was discharged a year later. He re-enlisted later that year and served with the Australian Army Veterinary Corps in France from 1918 to 1919. While in Europe, Murray took leave to study dairy science at an agricultural college in Scotland, and visited the United States before returning to Australia.

== Career ==
Murray was appointed a lecturer in dairy bacteriology and technology at Hawkesbury Agricultural College, before taking up a role as Principal of the Queensland Agricultural High School and College in Gatton, Queensland in 1923. He married Evelyn Andrews in 1924, a fellow University of Sydney graduate, before being appointed as the first Professor of Agriculture at the Queensland Agricultural College (now the University of Queensland Gatton Campus). He worked to improve the standard of education in agricultural science. Murray was Chairman of the Queensland Plant Breeding Committee. He became President of the Royal Society of Queensland in 1936. He was also a member of the Queensland State Committee of CSIR and the Australian National Research Council.

During the Second World War, Murray enlisted in the Second Australian Imperial Force and was made Commanding Officer of the 25th Battalion, Darling Downs Regiment in 1940, managed staff training for Northern Command, and rose to the rank of colonel in charge of AIF training depots. He became Chief Instructor of the Land Headquarters School of Civil Affairs at Duntroon, helping to retrain ex-servicemen after the war. His wife, Evelyn, was also involved with teaching at Gatton.

Murray was appointed Administrator of the Australian Territories in Papua and New Guinea from 1945 to 1952, and was knighted in 1978, for his contribution to the development of PNG as it moved toward independence. He returned to the University in 1953, and worked steadily on the project that created James Cook University. He was also active on the University of Queensland's Buildings and Grounds Committee, was on the board of Cromwell College and was a member of the University Union House Committee which oversaw the Student Union. He was appointed an Officer of the Order of the British Empire in 1959. He was awarded an Honorary Doctor of Science in 1967, became Emeritus Professor in 1975, and was advanced to Knight Commander of the Order of the British Empire in the 1978 New Year Honours. He was also active in the Scout Association of Australia.

== Legacy ==
Murray died in Brisbane on 10 December 1979 and was survived by his wife.

In recognition of his commitment to Gatton and education, his name was given to the J.K. Murray Library at UQ Gatton. His papers are held at the University of Queensland Fryer Library.
