= Basil Fairfax-Ross =

Nominated Member of the Legislative Council
- In office 1951–1963

Personal details
- Born: 4 April 1910; Springwood, Australia
- Died: 9 November 1984 (aged 74); Sydney, Australia

Basil Edward Fairfax-Ross CBE (4 April 1910 – 9 November 1984) was an Australian businessman who spent much of his career in the Territory of Papua and New Guinea. He served as a nominated member of the Legislative Council from 1951 to 1963.

== Biography ==
Fairfax-Ross was born in Springwood, New South Wales in 1910, the son of Doris Riverstone (née McCulloch) and Basil Fairfax-Ross. He attended the King's School in Parramatta but was unable to afford to study law at university. Following a short spell as a jackaroo, he moved to the Territory of Papua in 1931 to become a plantation assistant for Burns Philp. By World War II he had become an assistant inspector.

He enlisted in the Second Australian Imperial Force in 1940 and served with the 2/12th Battalion in the Middle East from 1940 to 1942. He then returned to New Guinea to join the Allied Intelligence Bureau, carrying out field intelligence work often behind enemy lines, including serving as a coastwatcher at Oro Bay. During the war he was twice mentioned in dispatches and rose to become a major. He was subsequently awarded the American Medal of Freedom in 1948.

After being demobilised in 1946 he married Jessie Agnes Dalton in Brisbane. He became assistant general manager at the British New Guinea Development Company in the same year, and was elected president of the Papua Planters' Association in 1949, a post he held until 1971. He became the company's general manager and a member of the Copra Marketing Board in 1951. In the same year was appointed as one of the three nominated European members of the Legislative Council, remaining a member until 1963. In 1961 he was also appointed to the Administrator's Council, remaining in the cabinet until 1963. In 1964 he was awarded a CBE.

Fairfax-Ross subsequently served as a member of the Council of the University of Papua New Guinea from 1965 to 1971 and as chairman of the Papua New Guinea Copra Marketing Board between 1971 and 1973. He was also a director of the Papua New Guinea Post-Courier. He retired from the British New Guinea Development Company in 1971 and moved to the Mosman area of Sydney, although remaining a director of Burns Philp and Bougainville Copper. He died at Royal North Shore Hospital in Sydney in November 1984 at the age of 74, survived by his wife and two daughters.
