= Copra =

Dried meat or kernel of the coconut

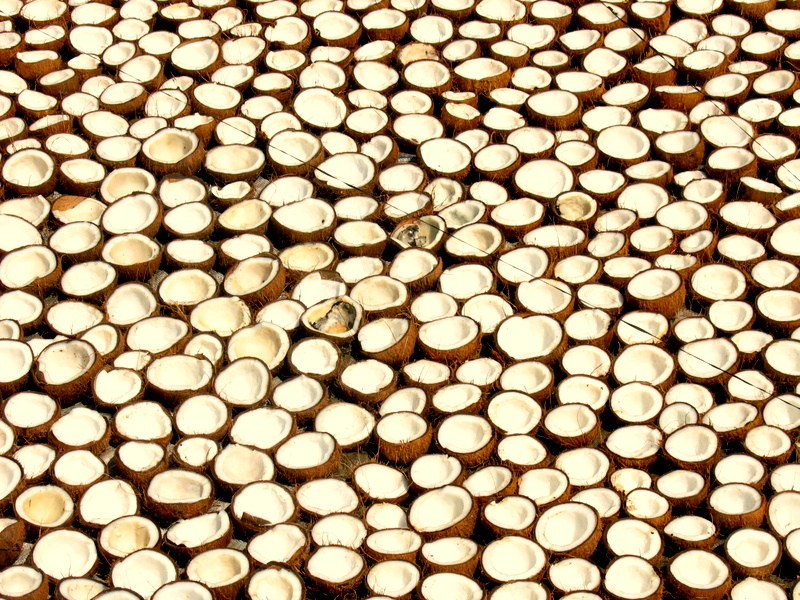

Copra (/ˈkoʊprə/, also /ˈkɒprə/; from Malayalam and Tamil, koppara or kopra or koprai) is the dried, white flesh of the coconut from which coconut oil is extracted. Traditionally, the coconuts are sun-dried, especially for export, before the oil, also known as copra oil, is pressed out.

The oil extracted from copra is rich in lauric acid, making it an important commodity in the preparation of lauryl alcohol, soaps, fatty acids, and cosmetics, and thus a lucrative product for many coconut-producing countries. The palatable oil cake, known as copra cake, is a residue in the production of copra oil used in animal feeds. The ground cake is known as coconut or copra meal.

== Production ==
Copra has traditionally been grated and ground, then boiled in water to extract coconut oil. It was used by Pacific island cultures and became a valuable commercial product for merchants in the South Seas and South Asia in the 1860s. Nowadays, coconut oil (70%) is extracted by crushing copra; the by-product is known as copra cake or copra meal (30%).

The coconut cake which remains after the oil is extracted is 18–25% protein, but contains so much dietary fiber it cannot be eaten in large quantities by humans. Instead, it is normally fed to ruminants.

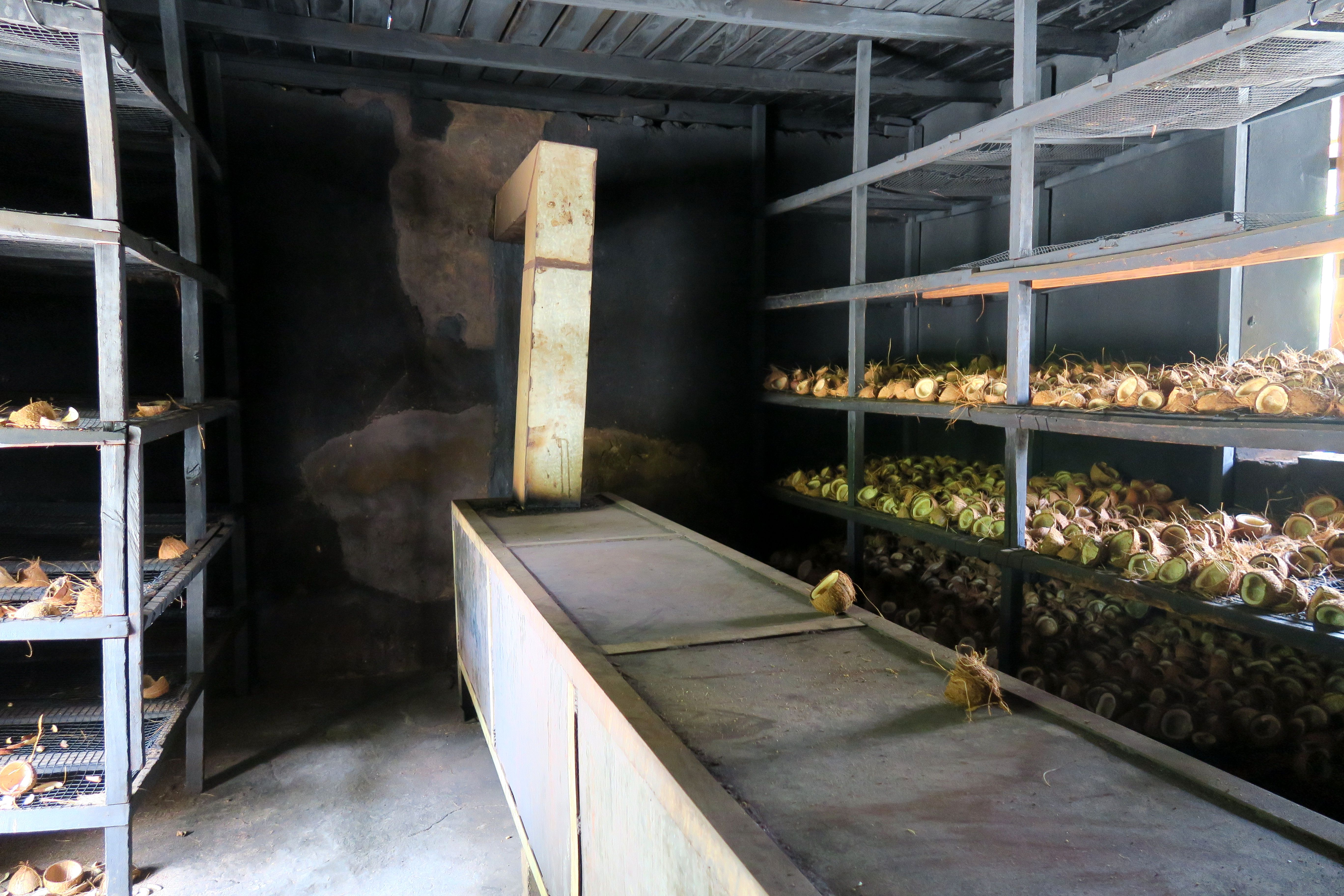
Copra kiln drying

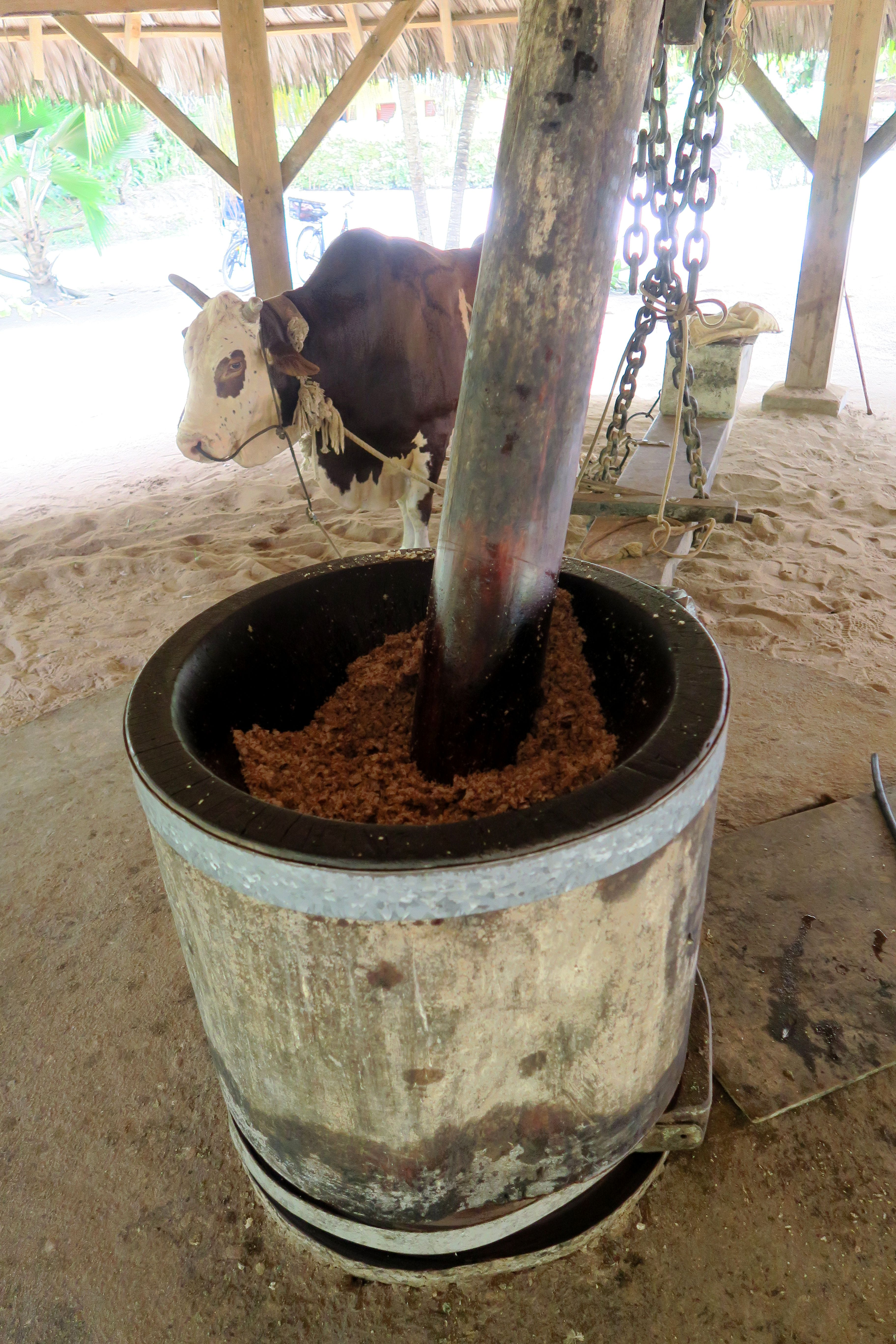
Crushing copra

The production of copra – removing the shell, breaking it up, drying – is usually done where the coconut palms grow. Copra can be made by smoke drying, sun drying, or kiln drying. Hybrid solar drying systems can also be used for a continuous drying process. In a hybrid solar drying system, solar energy is utilized during daylight and energy from burning biomass is used when sunlight is not sufficient or during night time. Sun drying requires little more than racks and sufficient sunlight. Halved nuts are drained of water, and left with the meat facing the sky; they can be washed to remove mold-creating contaminants. After two days the meat can be removed from the shell with ease, and the drying process is complete after three to five more days (up to seven in total). Sun drying is often combined with kiln drying, eight hours of exposure to sunlight means the time spent in a kiln can be reduced by a day and the hot air the shells are exposed to in the kiln is more easily able to remove the remaining moisture. This process can also be done in reverse order: partially drying the copra in the kiln, and finishing the process with sunlight. Starting with sun drying requires careful inspection to avoid contamination with mold while starting with kiln-drying can harden the meat and prevent it from drying out completely in the sun.

In India, small but whole coconuts can be dried over the course of eight months to a year, and the meat inside removed and sold as a whole ball. Meat prepared in this fashion is sweet, soft, oily and is cream-coloured instead of being white. Coconut meat can be dried using direct heat and smoke from a fire, using simple racks to suspend the coconut over the fire. The smoke residue can help preserve the half-dried meat but the process overall suffers from unpredictable results and the risk of fires.

While there are some large plantations with integrated operations, copra remains primarily a smallholder crop. In former years copra was collected by traders going from island to island and port to port in the Pacific Ocean but South Pacific production is now much diminished, with the exception of Papua New Guinea, the Solomon Islands and Vanuatu.

=== Economics ===
Copra production begins on coconut plantations. Coconut trees are generally spaced 9 m (30 ft) apart, allowing a density of 100–160 coconut trees per hectare. A standard tree bears around 50–80 nuts a year, and average earnings in Vanuatu (1999) were US$0.20 per kg (one kg equals 8 nuts)—so a farmer could earn approximately US$120 to US$320 yearly for each planted hectare. Copra has since more than doubled in price, and was quoted at US$540 per ton in the Philippines on a CIF Rotterdam basis (US$0.54 per kg) by the Financial Times on 9 November 2012.

In 2017 the value of global exports of copra was $145-146 Million. The largest exporter was Papua New Guinea with 35% of the global total, followed by Indonesia (20%), Solomon Islands (13%) and Vanuatu (12%). The largest importer of copra is the Philippines, which imports $93.4 Million or 64% of the global total. A very large number of small farmers and tree owners produce copra, which is a vital part of their income.

=== Nutrition ===
Coconut meat, raw
Nutritional value per 100 g (3.5 oz)
- Energy: 354 kcal (1,480 kJ)
- Carbohydrates: 15.2
- Sugars: 6.23
- Dietary fiber: 9 g
- Fat: 33.5
- Protein: 3.3 g
Vitamins and minerals
| Vitamins | Quantity %DV^{†} |
| Thiamine (B1) | 6% 0.066 mg |
| Riboflavin (B2) | 2% 0.02 mg |
| Niacin (B3) | 3% 0.54 mg |
| Pantothenic acid (B5) | 20% 1.014 mg |
| Vitamin B6 | 3% 0.05 mg |
| Folate (B9) | 7% 26 μg |
| Vitamin C | 4% 3.3 mg |
| Vitamin E | 2% 0.24 mg |
| Vitamin K | 0% 0.2 μg |
| Minerals | Quantity %DV^{†} |
| Calcium | 1% 14 mg |
| Iron | 14% 2.43 mg |
| Magnesium | 8% 32 mg |
| Phosphorus | 9% 113 mg |
| Potassium | 12% 356 mg |
| Sodium | 1% 20 mg |
| Zinc | 10% 1.1 mg |
- Other constituents: Quantity
- Water: 47
- Link to USDA FoodData Central database
- ^{†}Percentages estimated using US recommendations for adults, except for potassium, which is estimated based on expert recommendation from the National Academies.

Before drying to make copra, raw coconut meat is 47% water, 33% fat, 15% carbohydrates, and 3% protein (table). In a reference amount of 100 grams (3.5 oz), raw coconut flesh supplies 354 calories of food energy, and is a rich source (20% or more of the Daily Value, DV) of manganese (65% DV), with various other dietary minerals in moderate amounts (10–18% DV; table). It is a poor source of vitamins. Raw coconut meat has a high content of saturated fatty acids (89% of total fats), with lauric acid as the main saturated fat (15% of total; USDA source in table).

=== Aflatoxin susceptibility ===
Copra is highly susceptible to the growth of molds and their production of aflatoxins if not dried properly. Aflatoxins can be highly toxic, and are among the most potent known natural carcinogens, particularly affecting the liver. Aflatoxins in copra cake, fed to animals, can be passed on to milk or meat from livestock, leading to human illnesses.

== Animal feed ==
Copra meal is used as fodder for horses and cattle. Its high oil and protein levels are fattening for stock. The protein in copra meal has been heat treated and provides a source of high-quality protein for cattle, sheep and deer, because it does not break down in the rumen.

Coconut oil can be extracted using either mechanical expellers or solvents (hexane). Mechanically expelled copra meal is of higher feeding value, because it contains typically 8–12% oil, whereas the solvent-extracted copra meal contains only 2–4% oil. Premium quality copra meal can also contain 20–22% crude protein, and < 20ppb aflatoxin.

High-quality copra meal contains < 12% non-structural carbohydrate (NSC), which makes it well suited for feeding to horses that are prone to ulcers, insulin resistance, colic, tying up, and acidosis.

== Shipment ==
Copra has been classed with dangerous goods due to its spontaneously combustive nature. It is identified as a Division 4.2 substance.
