= Donald Cleland =

Australian administrator

Brigadier Sir Donald Cleland CBE
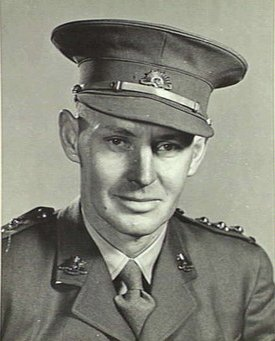
- Captain Donald Cleland in December 1939

Administrator of Papua and New Guinea
- In office 1952–1966
- Monarch: Elizabeth II
- Prime Minister: Sir Robert Menzies (1952–66); Harold Holt (1966)
- Preceded by: Sir Jack Murray
- Succeeded by: Sir David Hay

Personal details
- Born: 28 June 1901 Coolgardie, Western Australia
- Died: 27 August 1975 (aged 74) Port Moresby, Papua New Guinea
- Civilian awards: Knight Bachelor

Military service
- Allegiance: Australia
- Branch/service: Australian Army
- Years of service: 1919–1928; 1939–1945
- Rank: Brigadier
- Battles/wars: Second World War
- Military awards: Commander of the Order of the British Empire; Mentioned in Despatches (2)

Brigadier Sir Donald Mackinnon Cleland, CBE (28 June 1901 – 27 August 1975) was an Australian soldier and administrator.

== Early years ==
Born on 28 June 1901 at Coolgardie, Western Australia, eldest son of Adelaide-born Elphinstone Davenport Cleland, mine-manager, and his second wife Anne Emily, née Mackinnon, from Scotland. On 18 December 1928 he married Rachel Evans at St George's Cathedral, Perth, Western Australia. Energetic, with broad interests and deft social skills, Rachel complemented his dour, sometimes gruff, manner, and eased contact with diverse people. She was appointed Dame Commander of the Order of the British Empire in 1981.

== Political candidacy ==
Cleland stood for the Legislative Assembly seat of Claremont in the 1933 and 1936 state elections, on both occasions with the endorsement of the Nationalist Party. His chief opponent on both occasions was Charles North, the sitting Nationalist member since 1924 and a future Speaker. The margin between Cleland and North was 378 votes in 1933 and 79 votes in 1936 – Cleland polled 49.05% of the vote on the latter occasion.

== Military career ==
For his work as deputy assistant quartermaster general, I Corps, during the campaigns in Libya, Greece and Syria in 1941, he was appointed a Member of the Order of the British Empire (1942) and mentioned in despatches. In October 1942, he was promoted temporary brigadier. Again mentioned in despatches, Cleland was elevated to Commander of the Order of the British Empire in 1945.

== Administrative career in the Territory of Papua and New Guinea ==
Cleland became administrator, succeeding Sir Jack Murray and chaired the Legislative Council of the Territory of Papua and New Guinea (which became Papua New Guinea) from 1953 until 1964 and directed the introduction of the first House of Assembly elected by full adult franchise; he restructured the public service so that it would be dominated by Papua New Guineans, paid at a rate the country could afford; and he continued the elimination of discriminatory legislation, most obviously ending the liquor ban in 1962. He was knighted in 1961 and retired in 1967.

== Retirement ==
In retirement Cleland lived in Port Moresby, the only administrator of either territory to choose to stay there. He was pro-chancellor and chancellor (from 1971) of the University of Papua New Guinea, and chancellor (from 1967) of the Anglican diocese of Papua New Guinea. Sir Donald died on 27 August 1975 in Port Moresby. Accorded a state funeral, he was buried in the cemetery at Bomana. He was survived by his wife, Lady Rachel (née Evans), and their two sons. Rachel continued living in their house on Lawes Road in Port Moresby.
