= Chinese people in Papua New Guinea =

Chinese people in Papua New Guinea 巴布亞新幾內亞華人 巴布亚新几内亚华人
- (China) (Papua New Guinea)
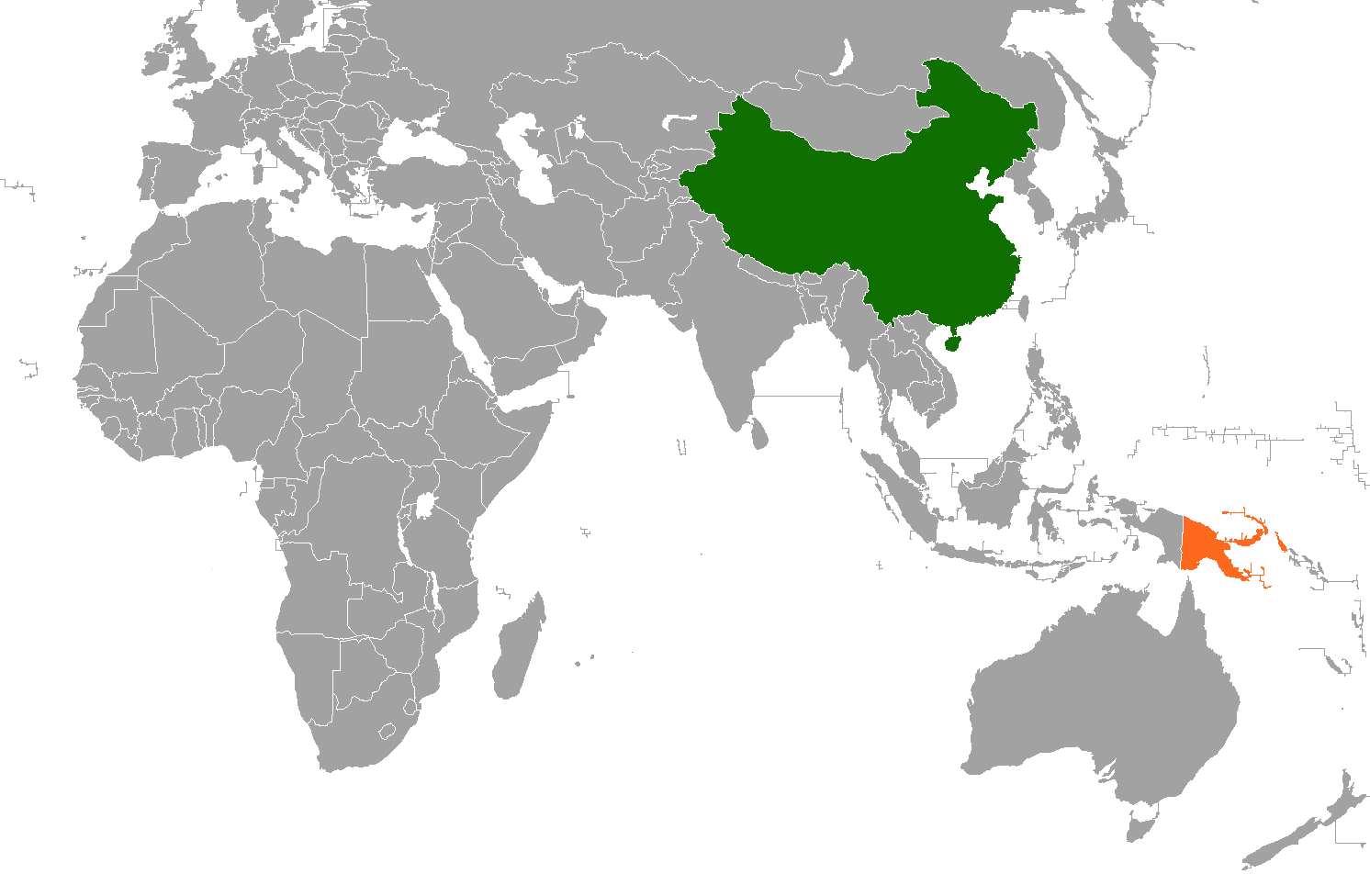

Total population
- 5,000–20,000

Regions with significant populations
- Port Moresby, Lae, Goroka and Mount Hagen

Languages
- Tok Pisin and English; Cantonese (among older people); Mandarin (among new immigrants)

Religion
- Christianity, minority Buddhism

Related ethnic groups
- Chinese Australian, Papuans, Melanesians

Chinese people in Papua New Guinea included, as of 2008, only about 1,000 of the "old Chinese"—locally born descendants of late 19th- and early 20th-century immigrants—remain in the country; most have moved to Australia. However, their numbers have been bolstered significantly by new arrivals from overseas Chinese communities in Southeast Asia and later from mainland China. There are also a few migrants from the Republic of China (Taiwan).

== Migration history ==
=== Origins ===
Beginning in 1888, the German New Guinea Company (GNGC) imported hundreds of indentured Chinese labourers each year, from Amoy (now Xiamen), Hong Kong, Singapore, and Sumatra to work on coconut and tobacco plantations. They suffered a fatality rate as high as 40% due to tropical diseases and harsh treatment. However, from 1898, the German government formally took over administration of the territory from the GNGC, and promoted free immigration instead of indentured labour. Carpenters, shipbuilders, engineers, tailors, and shopkeepers flowed into the territory, spreading out to various towns, including Rabaul, Kokopo, Kavieng, Lae, and Madang. Ships regularly sailed back and forth to Hong Kong. From a population of 200 in 1890, the Chinese community grew to 1427 by 1913. Of those, just 101 were women.

=== Australian invasion and League Mandate ===
In 1914, Australia invaded and occupied New Guinea; during the occupation, which continued until 1919, they refused further entry to Chinese. In 1920, New Guinea was formally placed under Australian control as a League of Nations mandate; the new administration extended laws of Australia, in particular the Immigration Restriction Act 1901, over New Guinea, making it far more difficult for Chinese to gain entry to the territory. Chinese who had settled there before 1922 received permanent residency, but those few who arrived afterwards could only receive temporary residency.

The Australians' 1921 survey of their new territory found a total of 1,424 Chinese (1,195 men, 229 women). The gender imbalance in the Chinese community would largely persist due to the policy of refusing entry to wives and children whom New Guinea-resident Chinese men had left behind in China; as a consequence, some Chinese men took indigenous women as wives instead. The children of their marriages tended to be brought up within the Chinese community.

There were also roughly 100 Chinese in Papua; however, movement between New Guinea and the Papua area was restricted, so the community there remained small. A 1933 survey found just five Chinese in Papua; Filipinos formed the dominant Asian group, with a population of 88. Port Moresby had only a single Chinese family, headed by Luk Poi Wai, a tailor.

By the eve of the Pacific War, the Chinese population in New Guinea exceeded 2,000.

=== Japanese invasion ===
After the Japanese attack on Pearl Harbor, with the Japanese invasion of New Guinea looming just over the horizon, the Australian government moved to evacuate white women and children from the territory. However, they made no similar moves to evacuate the Chinese population there. In early 1942, in response to the pleas of community members, this stance softened slightly, and 300 Chinese were flown to Australia; however, the majority of Chinese women were refused permission to leave. Left behind to face occupation by the Imperial Japanese Army, Chinese women became victims of atrocities at a far higher rate than indigenous women. According to community leader Chin Hoi Meen, "Chinese girls had to be supplied to [the Japanese] on demand"; under threat of beatings, death, or imprisonment in a soldiers' brothel as comfort women, Chinese women were also forced to enter into relationships and cohabit with Japanese officers. Chinese men were interned in concentration camps to perform hard labour. A total of 86 local Chinese residents died during the war, 37 of those having been killed by the Japanese. Among the dead was the head of the PNG branch of the Kuomintang, the main political party of the Republic of China at the time; he was executed by Japanese troops as a warning to the community.

In addition to their crimes against local Chinese people, the Japanese sent about 1,600 Republic of China Army prisoners-of-war to Rabaul as slave labourers; many died and were buried there. Some soldiers of Taiwan origin came as auxiliaries with the Japanese army as well.

=== Post-World War II ===
In 1946, the total Chinese population in Papua and New Guinea stood at roughly 2,000 people.

A new immigration policy promulgated in 1948 permitted entrance and temporary residence, in the form of exemptions from immigration restrictions, to Chinese engaged in overseas trade of a minimum volume of £1,000 per year. They would also be permitted to sponsor one assistant if their trade volume reached £2,500 per year, and one additional assistant for every £2,500 above that threshold, whose exemptions were to be reviewed every five years, and to nominate a temporary substitute to come to PNG in their place for up to three years if they had to leave the territory. Wives of traders who had lived in the territory since 1921 were granted a permanent exemption from immigration restrictions; others were granted temporary exemptions to be reviewed at three-year intervals. Finally, their dependents who left the territory could be granted re-entry permits with a validity of as long as five years. However, World War II and the ongoing Chinese Civil War had disrupted many of the Chinese community's links to China; even after 1949, though local Chinese were able to regain contact with their relatives in China, they found it difficult to go for visits or send their children their due to the lack of diplomatic relations between Australia and the new People's Republic of China government.

The 1966 census found a total of 566 persons born in China (64 men and 17 women in Papua; 297 men and 188 women in New Guinea), 288 persons holding Chinese nationality (206 men, 72 women), and 2,455 persons who responded "Chinese" when asked their race (1,391 men, 1,064 women). As late as the 1970s, local men continued to go to Hong Kong to find Chinese women to marry, and then brought them back to PNG.

In the 1950s, the Australian government gave the Chinese community a choice of taking up Australian citizenship; this decision marked one of the Australian government's earliest breaks in the White Australia policy.

=== Independence era ===
With independence in 1975, the bulk of the Chinese community in PNG chose to depart for Australia. However, their numbers began to be bolstered again by newcomers in the late 1970s and early 1980s, with ethnic Chinese from Malaysia, Singapore, Indonesia, and the Philippines arriving to work as timber merchants or traders. In the 1990s, as the local currency depreciated, their numbers decreased. However, the number of Chinese would continue to grow with the arrival of many new immigrants from the People's Republic of China, who came not just as employees of Chinese companies but also as independent traders.

== Community structure ==
=== Politics ===
Prior to PNG's independence, the Chinese community had no role in local administration; instead, their political participation was directed towards China. The New Guinea Branch of the Kuomintang (KMT) provided de facto leadership for the community. Though the Chinese Civil War ended with the victory of the Chinese Communist Party and the establishment of the People's Republic of China (PRC), most Chinese in PNG remained supporters of the Kuomintang and their Republic of China (ROC) government based on Taiwan, until the 1960s, when they began to realise that the KMT's plan to retake mainland China was unlikely to be realised. However, their fears of being labelled as communists led them to maintain at least public loyalty to Taiwan well after that, flying the flag of the Republic of China and continuing to send representatives to the ROC's National Assembly in Taipei until Australia's recognition of the PRC in 1972.

After independence, some of the Chinese who held PNG nationality became involved in local politics, primarily as fundraisers or middlemen for major politicians. A few, especially those of mixed blood, attained prominent positions in the government; the best known example is former prime minister Sir Julius Chan.

=== Business and employment ===
Due to the bureaucracy and delays involved in obtaining a work permit for foreigners, many companies bring in workers from China illegally, with some estimates suggesting as many as 300 Chinese people arrive each week without proper documentation.

=== Organisations ===
Migrants formed surname and hometown associations in Rabaul during the late 1910s and early 1920s. Port Moresby, in contrast, lacks any such association, due to the diversity and short history of the Chinese community there. Local Chinese there formed one social club, the Cathay Club, in the 1960s; some new Chinese immigrants have joined as well. They typically organise sports and games for their members.

=== Education ===
In Rabaul, there were two Chinese schools, each associated with a Christian denomination and established with teachers specially hired from China. The Overseas Chinese School (華僑學校) was established with support from the Methodist missionaries in 1922, while St. Theresa's Yang Ching School (養正學校) was set up two years later by Chinese community leaders with support from the Catholic Church. Chinese schools also sprang up in Madang and Kavieng. Many families also sent their children back to China for further studies, but this practise came to an end due to the outbreak of the Second Sino-Japanese War in 1937, and did not resume after peace returned. The wealthiest members of the community were also able to send their children to Australia for further studies.

In the 1950s, subsidies from the Australian government allowed an increasing number of Chinese from New Guinea to attend Australian universities. Their primary destinations were Queensland and New South Wales.

== Culture ==
=== Language ===
Most early Chinese immigrants traced their roots to southern coastal regions of China, especially Guangdong; Siyi dialect became the lingua franca among them, though others spoke various dialects of Cantonese or Hakka As a result, many younger ethnic Chinese have forgotten the language, or never learned it. Starting in the 1970s, many Chinese families hired indigenous women as nannies, who then taught Tok Pisin to the children.

=== Religion ===
Most Chinese in Papua New Guinea are at least nominally Christian. The German colonial era saw the first Chinese converts to Catholicism. Chinese Catholic and Methodist churches have been operating in Rabaul since the 1920s. In contrast, there is only one Buddhist temple in PNG, the Manjusri Buddhist Centre (曼珠精舍) in Port Moresby, established in 1994 by Malaysian Chinese expatriates and now operated by the Taiwan-based Fo Guang Shan order; they generally conduct sermons in Mandarin.

=== Ethnicity and identity ===
Due to gender imbalances, mixed marriages between Chinese men and indigenous women have long been common in PNG's Chinese community. The offspring of such marriages tended to be accepted as Chinese if they were raised within the community and learned the language. However, at the same time, the Chinese community tended to look down on indigenous people as "savages"; prior to independence, Chinese were in the middle tier of a racial hierarchy, discriminated against by whites but equally lording it over the indigenous people; after independence, they came to resent the political power those same indigenes had been given over them.

Even within the Chinese community, tensions exist between different groups of immigrants. Local Chinese in particular blame mainland China for disrupting previously-peaceful inter-ethnic relationships between the Chinese community and indigenous peoples. In particular, mainland Chinese migrants' activities have earned them a poor reputation not just among indigenous people, but among local Chinese and ethnic Chinese expatriates from Southeast Asia as well; the latter view them as "crooks" and "conmen". Mainland Chinese migrants' practise of illegally opening shops in sectors which are restricted to PNG nationals, such as low-end hospitality and retail businesses; these bring them into direct economic competition with local people. For example, during September 2007 anti-Chinese riots in Mount Hagen, PNG's third largest city, Chinese-owned warehouses became targets for arsonists and armed robbers.

== Notable people ==
- Sir Julius Chan, Prime Minister, 1980–82 and 1994–97
- Byron Chan, son of Julius and member of parliament for Namatanai District
- Jelta Wong, businessman and member of parliament for Gazelle District
- Chin Hoi Meen, businessman and community leader, recipient of the King's Medal for Courage in the Cause of Freedom
- David Chung, sports official
- Robert Seeto, former governor of New Ireland Province
- Ni Yumei Cragnolini, president of the Chinese Association
- Perry Kwan, Speaker of the Third House of Assembly - 20 April 1972 - 22 June 1972. Member for New Ireland.
- Michael Chow, radio personality at Australian Broadcasting Corporation
- Jenny Tan, model, internet personality, entrepreneur.

== See also ==
- Japanese settlement in Papua New Guinea
