= Australian New Guinea Administrative Unit =

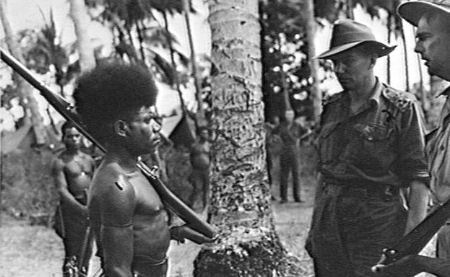
A member of the Papuan Constabulary with Brigadier Ivan Dougherty and an ANGAU warrant officer

The Australian New Guinea Administrative Unit (ANGAU) was the Australian military government administering the civil affairs of the Territory of Papua and the Mandated Territory of New Guinea during World War II, and operated from its formation on 21 March 1942 until the end of the war.

Civil officers from both Papua and the Mandated Territory of New Guinea were posted to ANGAU based in Port Moresby. ANGAU undertook civil tasks of maintaining law and medical services in areas not occupied by the Imperial Japanese and was responsible to the New Guinea Force (NGF). The major responsibility of the unit was to organize the resources of land and labour for the war effort. ANGAU was also responsible for recruiting, organising and supervising local labour for the Australian and American armed forces in New Guinea included rehabilitation of the local inhabitants in reoccupied areas. It was also responsible for the administration of the Pacific Islands Regiment.

The ANGAU officers and their native carriers, labourers, scouts, guides and police were highly regarded by the American and Australian military. After the end of World War II, ANGAU was abolished and replaced under the Papua New Guinea Provisional Administration Act (1945–46) by the combined civil government of Papua and New Guinea (PNG).
