= Territory of Papua and New Guinea =

Australian territory from 1949 to 1975

- 1949–1975
- Flag (1949–1971)

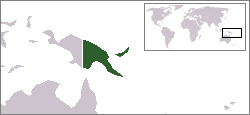
- Status: United Nations Trust Territory (New Guinea); External territory of Australia (Papua)
- Capital: Port Moresby
- Common languages: English (official); Hiri Motu; Tok Pisin
- Demonyms: Papua New Guineans, Papuans
- Monarch
  - 1949–1952: George VI
  - 1952–1975: Elizabeth II
- Administrator
  - 1949–1952 (first): Jack Keith Murray
  - 1974–1975 (last): Tom Critchley
- Chief Minister
  - 1972–1975 (last): Michael Somare
- Legislature: Legislative Council (1949–1963); House of Assembly (1963–1975)
- History
  - Papua and New Guinea Act 1949: 1 July 1949
  - Self-governing: 1 December 1973
  - Independence: 16 September 1975
- Currency: New Guinean pound (to 1966); Australian dollar (1966–1975); Papua New Guinean kina (1975)
Preceded by	Succeeded by
Territory of New Guinea; Territory of Papua	Independent State of Papua New Guinea; Republic of the North Solomons

The Territory of Papua and New Guinea (TPNG), known simply as Papua New Guinea after 1971, was an Australian external territory between 1949 and its independence as the Independent State of Papua New Guinea in 1975.

The Papua and New Guinea Act 1949 created a joint administration for two territories already under Australian administration: the Territory of Papua in south-east New Guinea and the Territory of New Guinea in north-east New Guinea. The former had been an Australian territory since 1902, while the latter was a League of Nations mandate (and later United Nations trust territory) administered by Australia since 1914.

Until self-government was granted in 1973, the territory was governed by an Australian-appointed administrator based in Port Moresby, supervised by Australian federal government departments. A consultative Legislative Council was established in 1951 and replaced by a fully elective House of Assembly in 1964. Independence was granted by the Papua New Guinea Independence Act 1975.

== Background ==
In 1884, Germany formally took possession of the northeast quarter of the island and it became known as German New Guinea. In 1884, a British protectorate was proclaimed over Papua – the southern coast of New Guinea. The protectorate, called British New Guinea, was annexed outright on 4 September 1888 and possession passed to the newly federated Commonwealth of Australia in 1902 and British New Guinea became the Australian Territory of Papua, with Australian administration beginning in 1906.

The Australian Naval and Military Expeditionary Force seized German New Guinea and the neighbouring islands of the Bismarck Archipelago for the Allies in 1914, during the early stages of the First World War. At the 1919 Paris Peace Conference following the war, Australian Prime Minister Billy Hughes sought to secure possession of New Guinea from the defeated German Empire: telling the Conference: "Strategically the northern islands (such as New Guinea) encompass Australia like fortresses. They are as necessary to Australia as water to a city." Article 22 of the Treaty of Versailles provided for the division of Germany and the Central Powers' imperial possessions among the victorious Allies of World War I and German New Guinea, the Bismarck Archipelago and Nauru were assigned to Australia as League of Nations Mandates: territories "formerly governed [by the Central Powers] and which are inhabited by peoples not yet able to stand by themselves under the strenuous conditions of the modern world".

Shortly after the start of the Pacific War, the island of New Guinea was invaded by the Japanese. Most of West Papua, at that time known as Dutch New Guinea, was occupied, as were large parts of the Territory of New Guinea. The New Guinea campaign was a major campaign of the Pacific War. In all, some 200,000 Japanese soldiers, sailors and airmen died during the campaign against approximately 7,000 Australian and 7,000 American service personnel. Major battles included the Battle of Kokoda Trail, Battle of Buna-Gona and Battle of Milne Bay. The offensives in Papua and New Guinea of 1943–44 were the single largest series of connected operations ever mounted by the Australian armed forces. Bitter fighting continued in New Guinea between the Allies and the Japanese 18th Army based in New Guinea until the Japanese surrender in 1945.

== Establishment of the Territory of Papua and New Guinea ==
Following the Surrender of Japan in 1945, civil administration of Papua and New Guinea was restored, and under the Papua-New Guinea Provisional Administration Act (1945–46), Papua and New Guinea were combined in an administrative union. The Papua and New Guinea Act 1949 united, for administrative purposes only, the Territory of Papua and the Territory of New Guinea as the Territory of Papua and New Guinea. The Act formally approved the placing of New Guinea under the international trusteeship system and confirmed the administrative union of New Guinea and Papua under the title of The Territory of Papua and New Guinea. It also provided for a Legislative Council (which was established in 1951), a judicial system, a public service, and a system of local government. The House of Assembly replaced the Legislative Council in 1963, and the first House of Assembly of Papua and New Guinea opened on 8 June 1964.

Post war, Australian policy in the territory was guided by Australian Labor Minister for External Territories Eddie Ward. Initially during the period of World War II the department had a minimal role in the affairs of the territory, due to it being administered by ANGAU. The department was also slow to respond to demands for reform from the colonial administration in Port Moresby. This resulted in proposals for post war reform being issued by other departments in the Australian government.

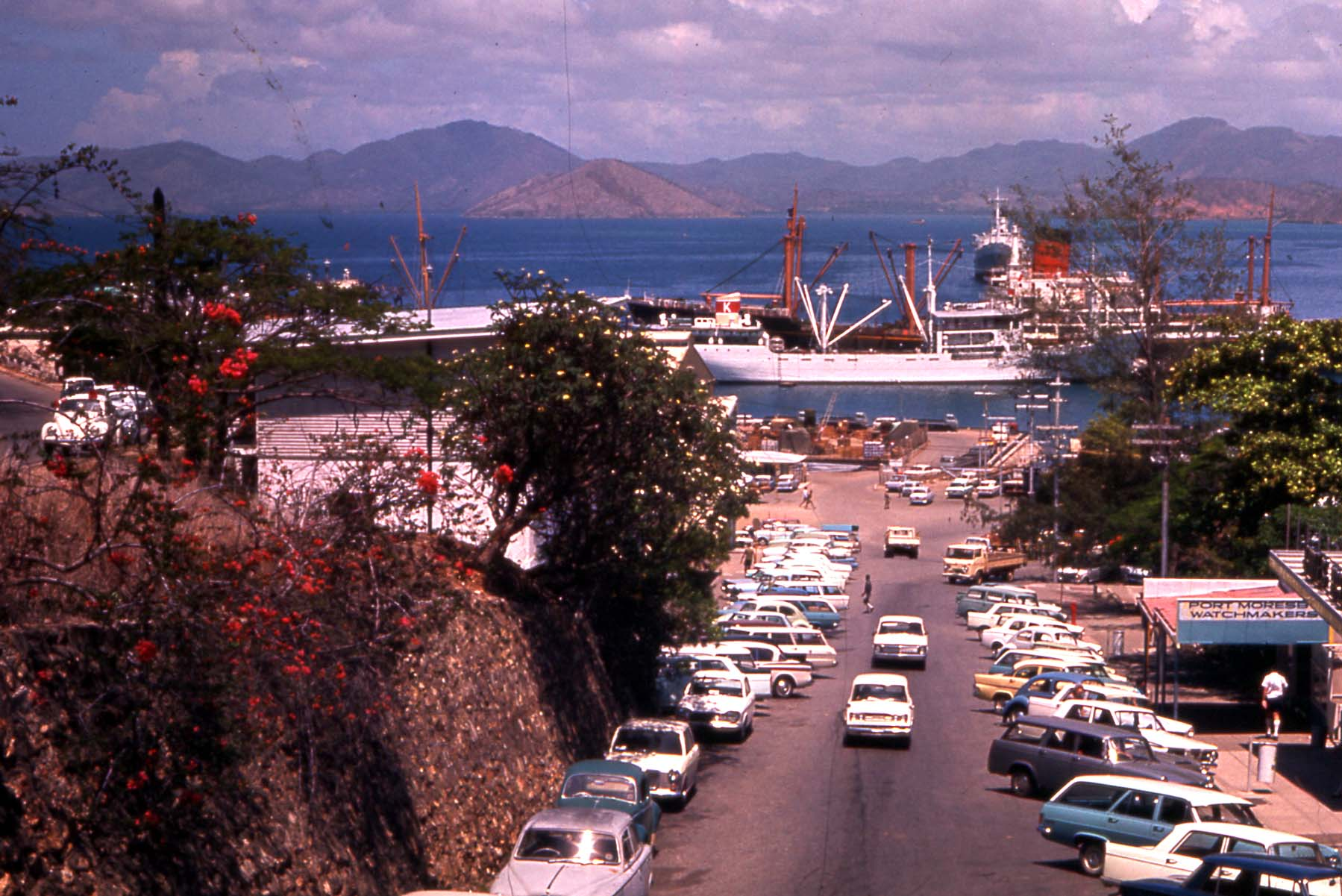
The capital Port Moresby in 1966

In 1963, the population was approximately two million, of which about 25,000 were non-indigenous. The economy was based on cash crops including coffee, cocoa, and copra as well as timber mills, wharves and factories. Difficult terrain rendered communication between districts difficult and there was a lack of national unity in the territory.

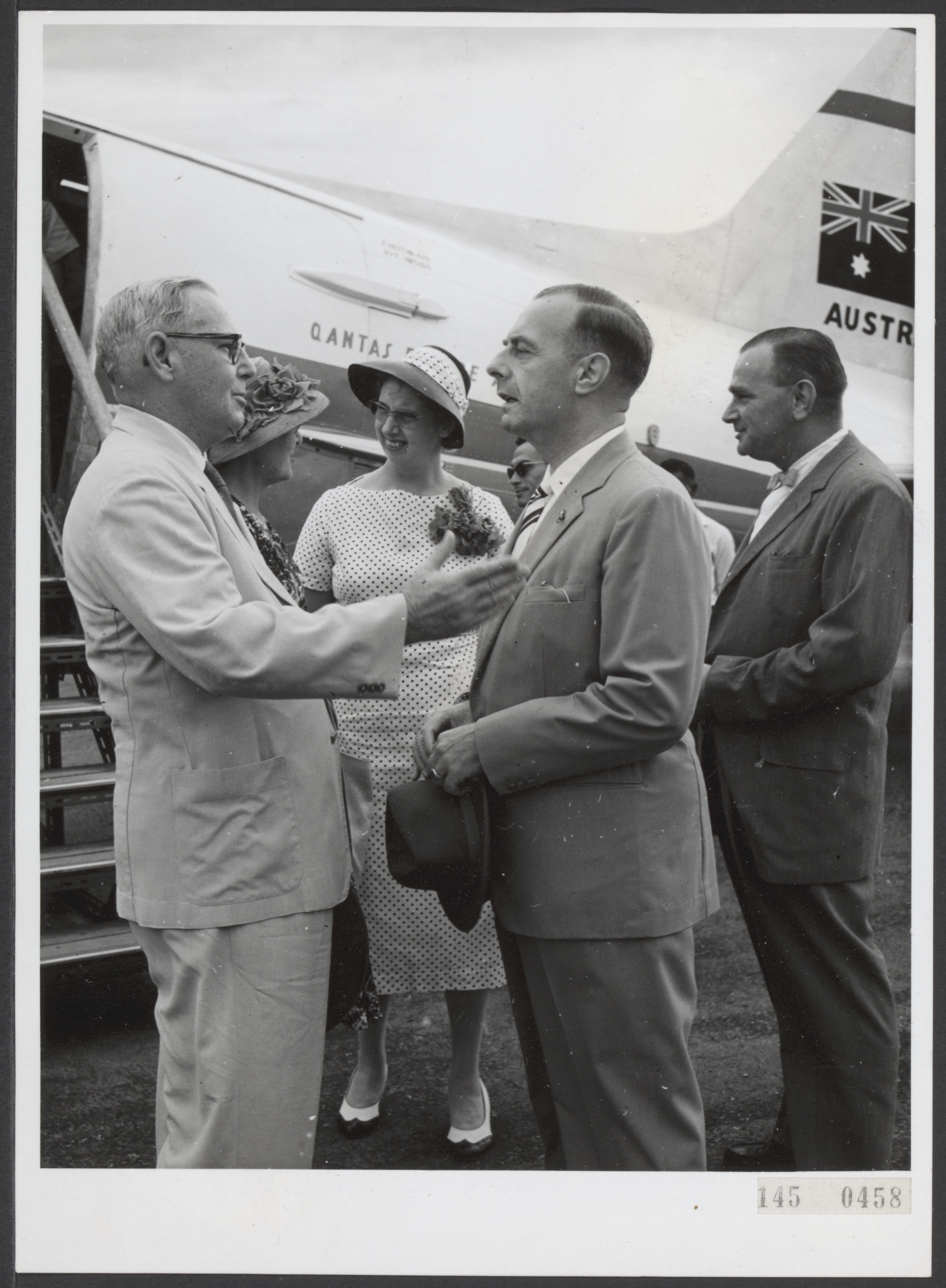
1959 photograph of the Administrator of Papua and New Guinea, Donald Cleland, visiting PJ Platteel, Governor of Dutch New Guinea, in Hollandia (modern Jayapura, Indonesia).

One of the ways in which the territory was administered was through the use of patrol officers. Between 1949 and 1974, more than 2000 Australians served as patrol officers, known locally as "kiaps". The job of patrol officers involved: facilitating the consolidation of administrative influence, maintaining the rule of law, conducting court cases and presiding as Magistrate, carrying out police work, conducting censuses, encouraging economic development, providing escorts, purchasing land for governmental use and overseeing local elections.

== Towards independence ==
On 13 December 1971 the name of the territory was changed to Papua New Guinea. Under Australian Minister for External Territories Andrew Peacock, the territory adopted self-government in 1972. 1972 elections saw the formation of a ministry headed by Chief Minister Michael Somare, who pledged to lead PNG to self-government and then to independence. Following the passage of the Papua New Guinea Independence Act 1975, during the term of the Whitlam government in Australia, the Territory became the Independent State of Papua New Guinea and attained independence on 16 September 1975.

== Economy ==
The economy of the territory was dependent on the export of raw materials and under the control of foreign, mostly Australian, investors. In the private sector dealing with agriculture, forestry and fisheries Australian enterprises produced about one-third, or $24 million worth, of total output. The primary agricultural products in the territory were cocoa, coffee, copra, tea and rubber. All of these sectors were dominated by Australian expatriates and companies. Both the industrial and tourism sectors were dominated by Australians, with 98-99% of all factories and 90% of all tourism related businesses under Australian ownership. Likewise commerce was also dominated by Australians, with three large Australian companies making up 85% of all retail trade at independence. The public sector of Papua New Guinea was also reliant on Australian aid. This is evident in the fact that in the years preceding independence Australia provided 55% of public sector spending. This relationship has continued to the present day as PNG is one of the largest recipients of Australian foreign aid.

Under the Highlands Labour Scheme, in place from 1950 to 1974, contract labourers from the isolated Highlands were recruited en masse to fill labour shortages in the coastal regions, including on copra plantations. The money and goods brought home by returning workers had a major impact on the economy of the Highlands.

== See also ==
- History of Papua New Guinea
- History of Nauru – the other League of Nations mandate and United Nations Trust Territory of Australia
