= Legislative Council of Papua and New Guinea =

Legislative body in Papua New Guinea 1951–1963

Type
- Type: Unicameral legislature

History
- Founded: October 1951
- Disbanded: May 1964; 62 years ago
- Succeeded by: House of Assembly

Leadership
- President (Note: In Part V – Division II – Section 43 of the Papua and New Guinea Act 1949 Jack Keith Murray, as Administrator of the Territory, is the President of the Legislative Council.): Jack Keith Murray
- Assistant Administrator (Note: As Section 43 (Papua and New Guinea Act 1949) states: “In his absence, the senior official member of the Legislative Council who is present shall preside.” That role being the Assistant Administrator.): Donald Cleland

Structure
- Seats: 29 (Note: Including the Administrator (President of the Legislative Council) the number is 29. This number of seats was in the first sitting of the Legislative Council. It later expanded to hold thirty-seven seats.)
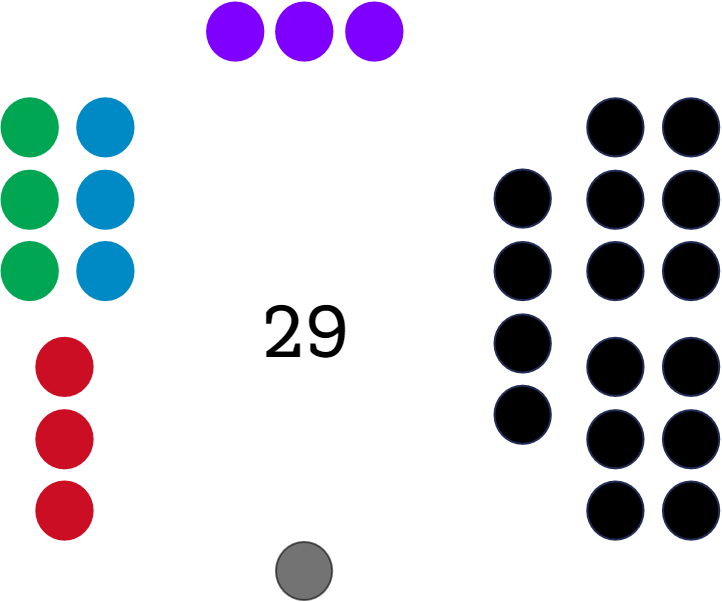
- Appointed member political groups: Administration (16): Official/Ex-Officio Members (16); Other (12): Elected Members (3); Indigenous Members (3); Christian Missionary (3); Other Non-Official Members (3); President (1): President (1)
- Length of term: For elected members (3), less than three years

Elections
- Appointed member voting system: 25 appointed by the Governor-General on the advice of the Administrator
- Elected member voting system: First-past-the-post in three electorates

Constitution
- Constitution of Australia

The Legislative Council of Papua and New Guinea was a legislative body in Papua New Guinea between 1951 and 1963. It was established by the Papua and New Guinea Act 1949 of Australia, which provided for the combined administration of the Territory of Papua and Territory of New Guinea under the United Nations trust territory system. It had the power to make Ordinances for the "peace, order and good government" of the territory, subject to the assent of the Australian-appointed Administrator.

The Legislative Council initially consisted of 28 members and the Administrator: sixteen "official members" representing the Territorial administrator, three non-official elected members, three non-official members "representing the interests of the Christian missions in the Territory", three non-official native members, and three other non-official members. As a result, it was considered to be largely dominated by the Australian administration.

The first elections were held in 1951, with the first council sittings beginning in November 1951. In the first elections, there were only 664 people on the electoral roll in Papua, 537 on the New Guinea mainland and 496 in the New Guinea islands, with "not much more than half of those enrolled" voting. The Australian administration surrendered its majority in reforms in 1960 following international pressure for decolonisation, which increased membership to 37: 14 nominated officials, 12 elected members and 10 non-elected members, at least five of which were required to be indigenous.

It was abolished in May 1963 and replaced by the House of Assembly of Papua and New Guinea (with effect from 1964) following a United Nations Trusteeship Council report that had recommended the establishment of a parliament in the territory.
