= List of lakes of Papua New Guinea =

This is a list of lakes in Papua New Guinea. There are about 5383 freshwater lakes in the country. The majority of lakes measure less than 0.1 km^{2} (0.039 sq mi) but the biggest one is 647 km^{2} (250 sq mi) in size.

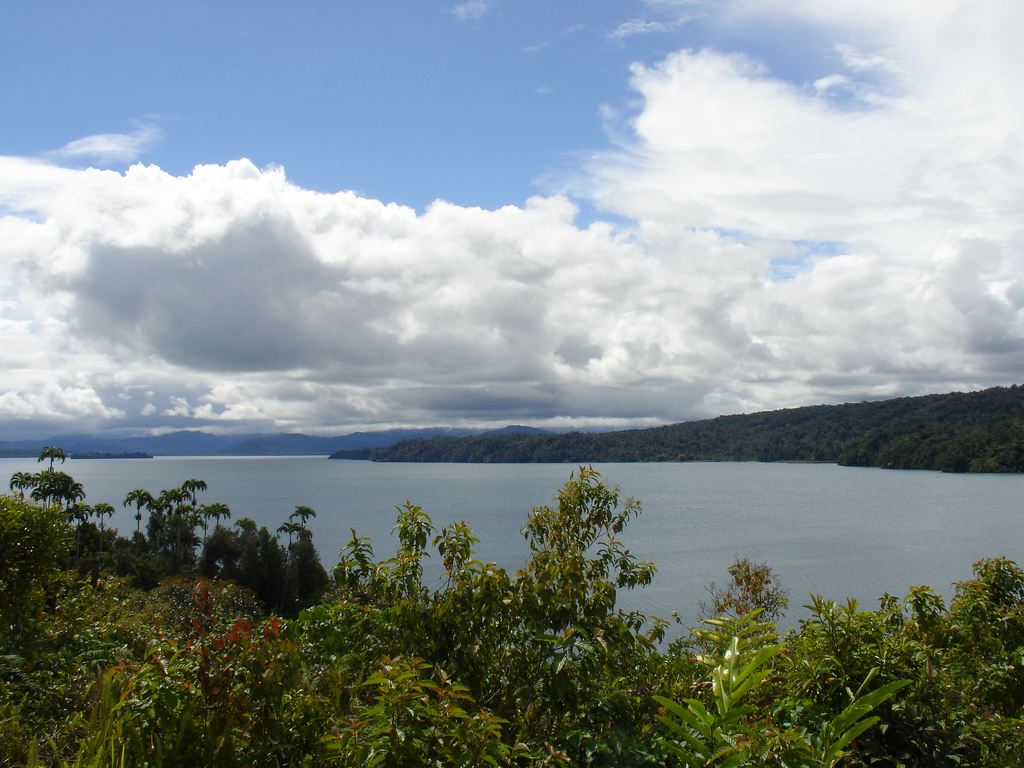
Lake Kutubu, Southern Highlands, Papua New Guinea

== Lakes ==
| Lake | Location | Area | Notes | Coordinates |
|---|---|---|---|---|
| Blackwater Lakes | East Sepik Province | 10.1 km^{2} (3.9 sq mi) | | 4°35′17.59″S 143°15′27.61″E |
| Lake Bune | Southern Highlands Province | 0.17 km^{2} (0.066 sq mi) | The first Europeans to explore the Southern Highlands, Leahy brothers, called it lake Unimi. Nearby village named after lake Lake Bune. | 6.1720043°S 144.0172286°E |
| Chambri Lakes | East Sepik Province | 216 km^{2} (83 sq mi) | | 4°16′32.31″S 143°6′5.27″E |
| Lake Iviva | Enga Province | 0.72 km^{2} (0.28 sq mi) | | 4°35′17.59″S 143°15′27.61″E |
| Lahala Lake | Autonomous Region of Bougainville | 5.66 km^{2} (2.19 sq mi) | | 6°40′53.23″S 155°56′2.38″E |
| Lake Egari | Southern Highlands Province | 0.2 km^{2} (0.077 sq mi) | | 6°1′8.5″S 143°41′48.4″E |
| Lake Kopiago | Hela Province | 0.88 km^{2} (0.34 sq mi) | Notable for it floating islands. | 5°24′19.15″S 142°29′16.33″E |
| Lake Kutubu | Southern Highlands Province | 49.24 km^{2} (19.01 sq mi) | Ramsar site | 6°24′S 143°20′E |
| Lake Guri | Madang Province | 0.46 km^{2} (0.18 sq mi) | Near Tsumba Mission on Ramu river. | 4°37′43″S 144°35′49″E |
| Lake Gwam | Morobe Province | 0.2 km^{2} (0.077 sq mi) | | 6°19′18.3″S 147°06′54.3″E |
| Lake Hargy | East New Britain Province | 9.3 km^{2} (3.6 sq mi) | | 5°22′S 151°08′E |
| Murik Lakes | East Sepik Province | | A cluster of saltwater and freshwater lakes in Sepik River estuaries at Bismarck Sea. | 3°49′S 144°15′E |
| Lake Murray | Middle Fly District, Western Province | 647 km^{2} (250 sq mi) | | 7°S 141.5°E |
| Lake Onim | Southern Highlands Province | 0.36 km^{2} (0.14 sq mi) | The first Europeans to explore the Southern Highlands, Leahy brothers, called it lake Tangigi. | 6°09′57.4″S 143°59′05″E |
| Lake Tareko | National Capital District | 1.27 km^{2} (0.49 sq mi) | | 9°22′28.5″S 147°11′11.1″E |
| Lake Warangai | East Sepik Province | 7.8 km^{2} (3.0 sq mi) | | 4°22′33.62″S 141°56′33.98″E |

== Volcanic crater lakes ==
| Volcanic crater lake | Location | Area | Notes | Coordinates |
|---|---|---|---|---|
| Balbi | Autonomous Region of Bougainville | 0.07 km^{2} (0.027 sq mi) | One of six volcano craters has a lake in it. | 5°54′41.3″S 154°59′44″E |
| Billy Mitchell Crater Lake | Autonomous Region of Bougainville | 3 km^{2} (1.2 sq mi) | | 6°05′20″S 155°13′36″E |
| Dakataua | West New Britain Province | 48 km^{2} (19 sq mi) | Located on Willaumez Peninsula, New Britain | 5°01′37.3″S 150°05′23″E |
| Karkar | Madang Province | Lake dried out. | Located on Karkar Island. | 4°38′59.08″S 145°58′20.41″E |
| Loloru | Autonomous Region of Bougainville | 0.9 km^{2} (0.35 sq mi) | Sacred place, hunting on the lake is forbidden. | 6°31′S 155°37′E |
| Lake Namor | West New Britain Province | 1.55 km^{2} (0.60 sq mi) | Located on Lolobau Island | 4°56′50.0″S 151°11′14.2″E |
| Sakar | Morobe Province | 0.13 km^{2} (0.050 sq mi) | Located on Sakar Island | 5°24′19.8″S 148°04′50.1″E |
| Wisdom Lake | Madang Province | 86.7 km^{2} (33.5 sq mi) | Located on Long Island | 5°20′12.34″S 147°6′13.12″E |
| Victory | Ijivitari District, Oro Province | 0.17 km^{2} (0.066 sq mi) | Located on Cape Nelson. | 9°12′33.3″S 149°04′35.6″E |

== Dams ==
| Dam | Location | Area | Notes | Coordinates |
|---|---|---|---|---|
| Yonki Dam | Eastern Highlands Province | | | 6°15′05″S 145°58′49″E |
| Sirinumu Dam | Central Province | | | 9°30′10″S 147°28′41″E |
| Wabo Dam | Gulf Province | | Proposed Hydroelectric plant on Purari River. | |
