= Somare =

Somare is a surname. Notable people with the surname include:

- Arthur Somare, Papua New Guinean politician
- Michael Somare (1936–2021), Papua New Guinean politician and the first prime minister
- Veronica Somare (born 1946), first lady of Papua New Guinea
