= Economy of Papua New Guinea =

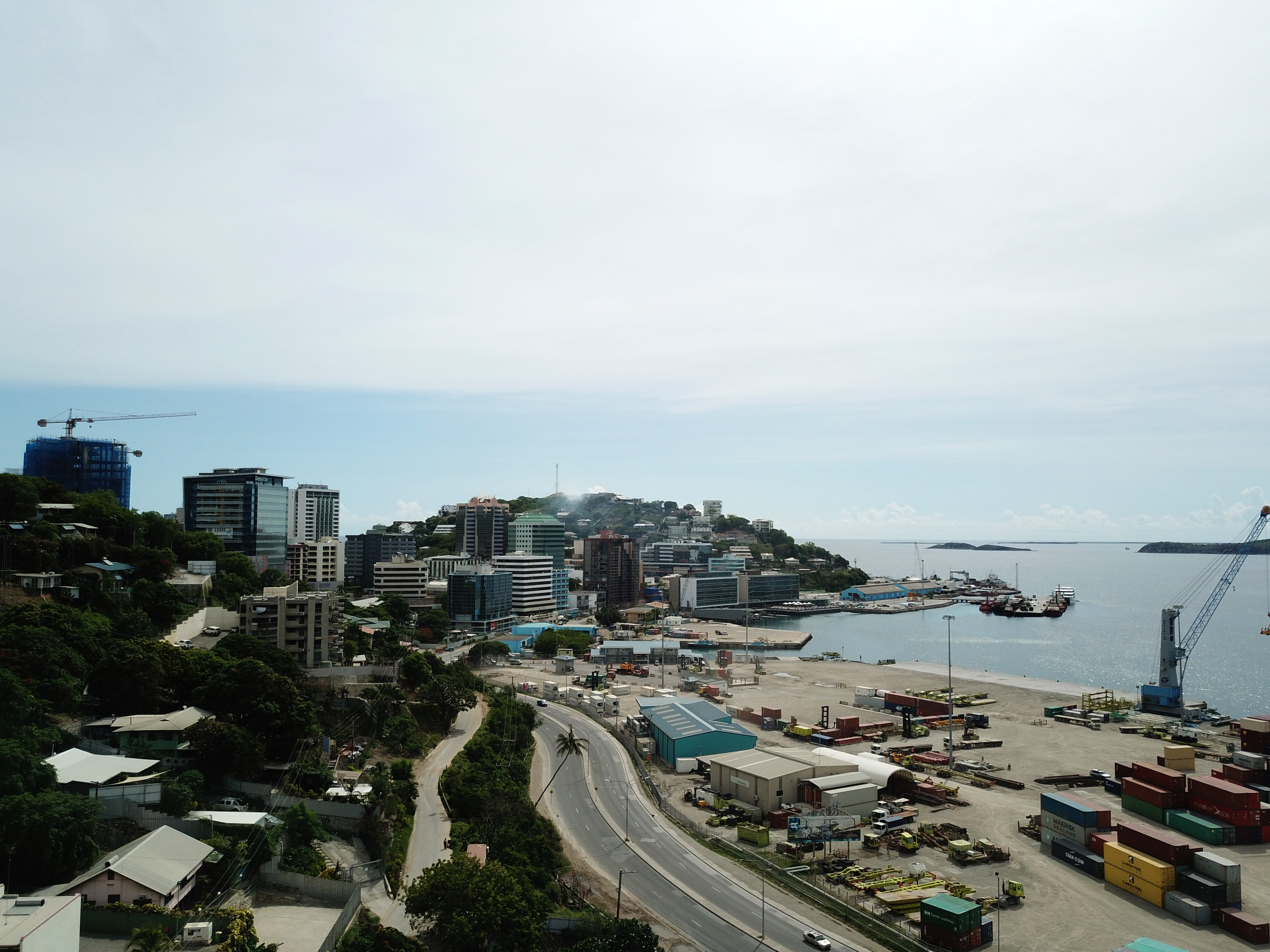
- Port Moresby
- Currency: kina (PGK)
- Fiscal year: calendar year
- Trade organisations: APEC and WTO
- Country group: Developing/Emerging; Lower-middle income economy

Statistics
- Population: ▲10,576,502 (2024)
- GDP: ▲$36.30 billion (nominal, 2026 est.); ▲$52.27 billion (PPP, 2025 est.)
- GDP rank: 111th (nominal, 2026); 133th (PPP, 2026)
- GDP growth: ▲6.2% (2025); ▲3.1% (2026); ▲4.0% (2027)
- GDP per capita: ▲$3,419 (nominal, 2026 est.); ▲$4,923 (PPP, 2026 est.)
- GDP per capita rank: 141st (nominal, 2026); 161st (PPP, 2026)
- GDP by sector: agriculture: 22.1%; industry: 42.9%; services: 35%; (2017 est.)
- Inflation (CPI): 4.4% (2020 est.)
- Population below national poverty line: 39.9% below poverty line (2009 est.); 65.6% on less than $3.20/day (2009)
- Gini coefficient: 41.9 medium (2009, World Bank)
- Human Development Index: ▲0.576medium (2021) (156th); N/A IHDI (2018)
- Labour force: ▲3,746,653 (2025); 50.6% employment rate (2022)
- Labour force by occupation: agriculture: 85%; industry: NA%; services: NA%
- Unemployment: 2.5% (2017 est.)
- Main industries: Natural gas extraction, palm oil processing, plywood production, mining (gold, silver, copper); wood chip production; crude oil and petroleum products; construction, tourism, livestock (pork, poultry, cattle), dairy products, spice products (turmeric, vanilla, ginger, cardamom, chili, pepper, citronella, and nutmeg), fisheries products

External
- Exports: ▲$13.9 billion (2024 est.)
- Export goods: Petroleum gas, gold, copper ore, crude petroleum, nickel, palm oil, lumber, fish, coffee
- Main export partners: Japan 23.4%; China 21.8%; Australia 19.3%; South Korea 7.2%; Taiwan 6.8% (2024)
- Imports: ▲$5.48 billion (2024 est.)
- Import goods: Refined petroleum, rice, delivery trucks, excavation machinery, motor vehicles; parts and accessories, foodstuffs
- Main import partners: China 29.0%; Australia 24.3%; Singapore 16.1%; Malaysia 6.3% (2024)
- FDI stock: ▲$4,194 Million (31 December 2017 est.); ▲ Abroad: $473 Million (31 December 2017 est.)
- Current account: ▲$4.859 billion (2017 est.)
- Gross external debt: ▼$17.94 billion (31 December 2017 est.)

Public finance
- Government debt: 36.9% of GDP (2017 est.)
- Foreign reserves: ▲$1.735 billion (31 December 2017 est.)
- Budget balance: −4.8% (of GDP) (2017 est.)
- Revenue: 3.638 billion (2017 est.)
- Spending: 4.591 billion (2017 est.)
- Economic aid: no data
- Credit rating: Standard & Poor's: BB- (Domestic); B+ (Foreign); BB (T&C Assessment); Outlook: Stable; Moody's: B2; Outlook: Stable
- All values, unless otherwise stated, are in US dollars.

The economy of Papua New Guinea (PNG) is largely underdeveloped with a large amount of the population below the poverty line. It is dominated by the agricultural, forestry, and fishing sector and the minerals and energy extraction sector. The agricultural, forestry, and fishing sector accounts for most of the labour force of PNG while the minerals and energy extraction sector, including gold, copper, oil and natural gas is responsible for most of the export earnings.

PNG's GDP growth has been driven by the extraction industries and real GDP growth per capita has averaged 4% since mid-2000. The country has made significant progress investing proceeds from oil and gas in infrastructure building. As a result, its major cities like Port Moresby and Lae have received increased international investor attention, giving rise to an unprecedented building boom to exploit the opportunities presented by the country's rise as a regional economic leader in the South Pacific region. This is well supported by its strategic location as a gateway from the Pacific to Asia, as well as its comparatively huge landmass and demographic profile (almost 7 times that of the rest of the smaller Pacific Island nations).

According to the International Monetary Fund, PNG, despite its poverty, is richly endowed with natural resources, but exploitation has been hampered by the rugged terrain and the high cost of developing infrastructure. Agriculture provides a subsistence livelihood for the bulk of the population. Mineral deposits, including oil, copper, and gold, account for 72% of export earnings.

Budgetary support from Australia and development aid under World Bank auspices continue to sustain the economy. Australia is PNG's largest aid donor, and will provide $479.2 million of aid in 2023. In June 2021 the World Bank approved a US$100 million (PGK 352 million equivalent) operation to support Papua New Guinea in its response to COVID-19, and to lay important foundations for a sustainable recovery.

== Overview ==
Port Moresby's central business district

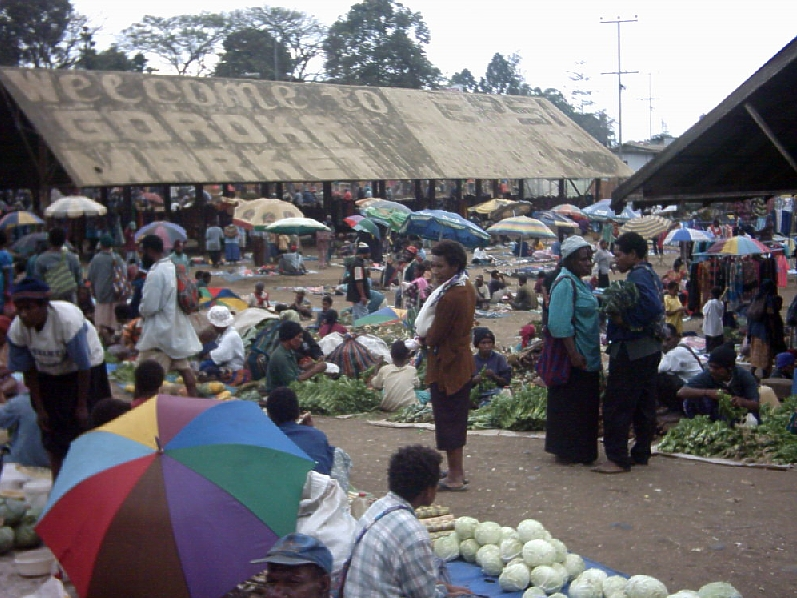
Main market in Goroka

Papua New Guinea is classified as a developing economy by the International Monetary Fund. The economy is largely dependent on natural resources, where capital investment is dominated by mining and oil, while most labour is taken up by agriculture. As of 2018, natural resource extraction made up 28% of overall GDP, with substantial contributors including minerals, oil, and natural gas.

According to the Investment Promotion Authority of Papua New Guinea the major economic sectors are agriculture and livestock, forestry, mining and petroleum, tourism and hospitality, fisheries and marine resources, manufacturing, retailing and wholesaling, building and construction, transport and telecommunications, and finance and business trade. The economy generally can be separated into subsistence and market sectors, although the distinction is blurred by smallholder cash cropping of coffee, cocoa, and copra. About 75% of the country's population relies primarily on the subsistence economy. The minerals, timber, and fish sectors are dominated by foreign investors. Manufacturing is limited, and the formal labour sector consequently also is limited.

Timber and marine resources are also exported, with the country being one of the few suppliers of tropical timber, Forestry is an important economic resource for Papua New Guinea, but the industry uses low and semi-intensive technological inputs. As a result, product ranges are limited to sawed timber, veneer, plywood, block board, moulding, poles and posts and wood chips. Only a few limited finished products are exported. Lack of automated machinery, coupled with inadequately trained local technical personnel, are some of the obstacles to introducing automated machinery and design. Forestry is an avenue for corruption and many projects face legal uncertainty. Up to 70% of logging may be illegal. Marine fisheries provide around 10% of global catch. The EEZ forms the largest fisheries zone in the South Pacific. The dominant deep-sea fishery is tuna. There are also inland and coastal fisheries.

Other sources include renewable resources, such as forests, marine resources (including a large portion of the world's major tuna stocks), and in some parts agriculture. Agriculture, for subsistence and cash crops, provides a livelihood for 85% of the population and continues to provide some 30% of GDP. Oil palm production has grown steadily over recent years (largely from estates and with extensive outgrower output), with palm oil now the main agricultural export. Coffee remains the major export crop (produced largely in the Highlands provinces); followed by cocoa and coconut oil/copra from the coastal areas, each largely produced by smallholders; tea, produced on estates; and rubber.

Measuring economic growth is tricky due to the resource-dependent economy distorting GDP. Other metrics such as Gross national income are hard to measure. Even historical GDP estimates have changed dramatically. As of 2019, PNG's real GDP growth rate was 3.8%, with an inflation rate of 4.3% This economic growth has been primarily attributed to strong commodity prices, particularly mineral but also agricultural, with the high demand for mineral products largely sustained even during the crisis by the buoyant Asian markets, a booming mining sector and by a buoyant outlook and the construction phase for natural gas exploration, production, and exportation in liquefied form (liquefied natural gas or "LNG") by LNG tankers, all of which will require multibillion-dollar investments (exploration, production wells, pipelines, storage, liquefaction plants, port terminals, LNG tanker ships).

Formal employment is low. There is a minimum wage, but it has declined in real terms since independence. In the late 2010s, around 40% of those employed in urban areas worked outside of agriculture, but only around 20% in rural areas. Altogether, the informal economy supports about 85% of the population, mainly through subsistence agriculture.

The Papua New Guinean kina is managed through a crawling peg, with its value heavily impacted by the country's natural resource exports. The largest bilateral trade partner is Australia, followed by Japan, and then China.

== History ==
The first decade of independence saw slow but steady economic growth. The Ok Tedi Mine opened in 1982. While Australian contribution to the budget dropped from 40% of government revenue in 1975 to 17% in 1988, improved taxation allowed for government expenditure to be maintained. The closure of the Bougainville mine led to issues with government finances, however an expansion of exports of oil, minerals, and forestry products led to economic recovery in the early 1990s. This growth did not decrease inequality however, and government services declined. This economic decline both caused and was exacerbated by increases in violence. Local violence damaged infrastructure, and defence expenditure increased. In 1986 the public services lost a significant degree of independence, leading to their becoming more politicised. Increasing government expense and resulting rising debt led to significant economic trouble. The Papua New Guinean kina was devalued and put on a floating exchange rate in 1994, and the country obtained an emergency loan from the World Bank in 1995. The economy had a series of crises during the 1990s. A drought in 1997 caused by the El Niño–Southern Oscillation killed over 1,000 people.

GDP grew around 9.4% a year from 2008 to 2015, although this ranged from 0.7% from 2014 to 2015 to 21.1% from 2009 to 2010. The economy in this period relied heavily on foreign direct investment, which came to an end when liquefied natural gas began to be exported.

The GDP Growth rate for PNG in 2021 was at 1.3%. According to the Asian Development Bank its GDP was expected to grow 3.4% in 2022 and 4.6% in 2023.

== Sectors ==
=== Mineral resources ===
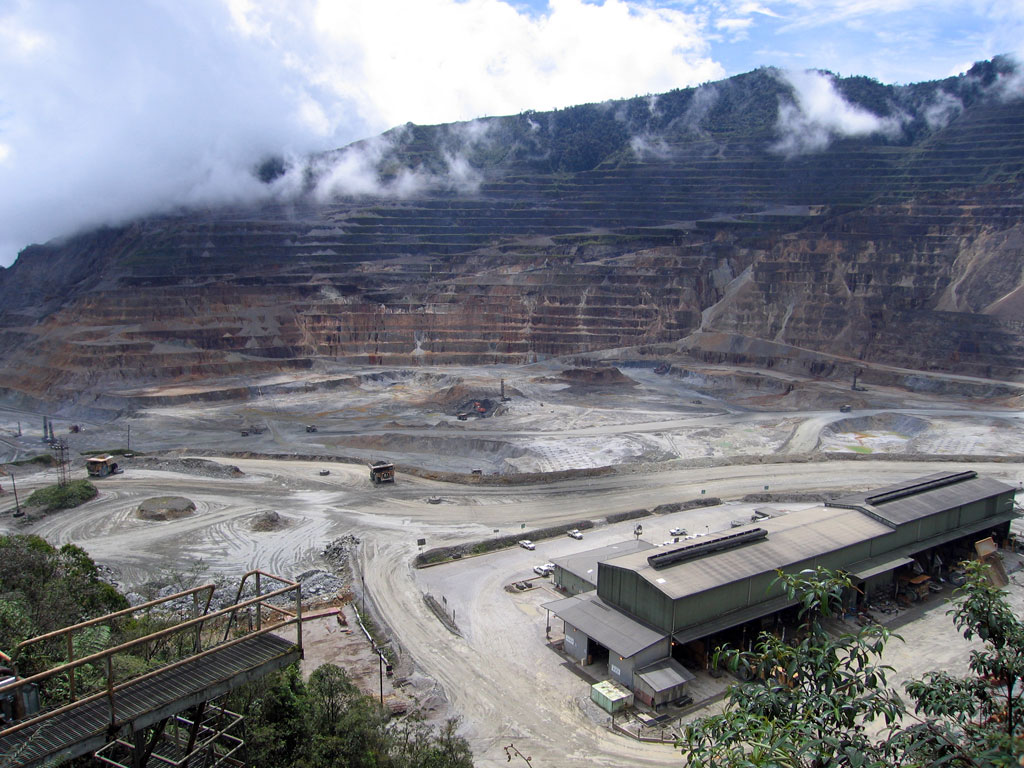
The Ok Tedi Mine in southwestern Papua New Guinea

Significant exported minerals include gold, copper, cobalt, and nickel. Oil and liquified natural gas (LNG) are also significant resource exports. Extractive resources make up 86% of all exports, has their high value has enabled the country to generally run current account surpluses. The biggest mine is a private gold mine on Lihir Island, which is followed by the state-run Ok Tedi Mine, and then the Porgera Gold Mine.

In 1999, mineral production accounted for 26.3% of gross domestic product. Government revenues and foreign exchange earning minerals. Copper and gold mines are currently in production at Porgera, Ok Tedi, Misima, Lihir, Simberi and Hidden Valley. As of 2014, talks of resuming mining operations in the Panguna mine have also resurfaced, with the Autonomous Bougainville Government and National Government of Papua New Guinea expressing interest in restarting mining operations in the area.

New nickel, copper and gold projects have been identified and are awaiting a rise in commodity prices to begin development. At early 2011, there are confirmation that Mount Suckling project has found at least two new large highly prospective porphyry bodies at Araboro Creek and Ioleu Creek. A consortium led by Chevron is producing and exporting oil from the Southern Highlands Province of Papua New Guinea. In 2001, it expects to begin the commercialization of the country's estimated 640 km^{3} (23 trillion cubic feet) of natural gas reserves through the construction of a gas pipeline from Papua New Guinea to Queensland, Australia. The project was shelved.

In 2019, the country was the 8th largest world producer of cobalt, and the 15th largest world producer of gold. In the production of silver, in 2017 the country produced 90 tons.

Mineral deposits account for 72% of export earnings.

Traces of gold were first found in 1852, in pottery from Redscar Bay on the Papuan Peninsula.

==== Oil and gas ====
The Iagifu/Hedinia Field was discovered in 1986 in the Papuan fold and thrust belt. Most crude oil produced is exported, although some is imported for energy production.

LNG exports began in 2014, although the opening of new projects has been delayed due to disputes regarding revenue sharing. Around 80% of all LNG produced is exported.

The first major gas project was the PNG LNG joint venture. ExxonMobil is operator of the joint venture, also comprising PNG company Oil Search, Santos, Kumul Petroleum Holdings (Papua New Guinea's national oil and gas company), JX Nippon Oil and Gas Exploration, the PNG government's Mineral Resources Development Company and Petromin PNG Holdings. The project is an integrated development that includes gas production and processing facilities in the Hela, Southern Highlands and Western Provinces of Papua New Guinea, including liquefaction and storage facilities (located northwest of Port Moresby) with capacity of 6.9 million tonnes per year. There are over 700 kilometres (430 mi) of pipelines connecting the facilities. It is the largest private-sector investment in the history of PNG. A second major project is based on initial rights held by the French oil and gas major TotalEnergies and the U.S. company InterOil Corp. (IOC), which have partly combined their assets after TotalEnergies agreed in December 2013 to purchase 61.3% of IOC's Antelope and Elk gas field rights, with the plan to develop them starting in 2016, including the construction of a liquefaction plant to allow export of LNG. TotalEnergies has separately another joint operating agreement with Oil Search.

Further gas and mineral projects are proposed (including the large Wafi-Golpu copper-gold mine), with extensive exploration ongoing across the country.

=== Agriculture, timber, and fish ===
The agricultural, forestry, and fishing sector accounts for most of the labour force of PNG. Agriculture currently accounts for 25% of GDP and supports more than 80% of the population. Most agriculture is subsistence, while cash crops are exported. The main crops by value are coffee, oil, cocoa, copra, tea, rubber, and sugar.

==== Agriculture ====
Agriculture in the country includes crops grown for domestic sale and international export, as well as for subsistence agriculture. Agricultural export of commodities such as copra, copra oil, rubber, tea, cocoa, and coffee have not grown. However, the conversion of forests to oil palm plantations to produce palm oil has become a significant and growing source of employment and income. Overall the country produces 1.6% of global palm oil, and 1% of global coffee. While not the largest sector of the economy, agriculture provides the most employment, at around 85% of all jobs.

Assessments of poverty have found that it is most common in rural areas. Nearly 40% of the population are subsistence farmers, living relatively independently of the cash economy. Their traditional social groupings are explicitly acknowledged by the Papua New Guinea Constitution, which expresses the wish for "traditional villages and communities to remain as viable units of Papua New Guinean society" and protects their continuing importance to local and national community life. This makes farming the most widespread economic activity. Most is carried out through simple rainfed surface irrigation, with specific techniques varying by location. Taro is a historical crop, although the introduction of the now-staple sweet potato allowed for cultivation as high as 2,700 metres (8,900 ft). Metroxylon (a sago palm) is another common crop.

It is estimated that only 30% of the country's land has climate conditions and terrain amenable to agriculture. Most produce comes from smallholders, who farm less than 5 acres (2.0 ha). Plantation production has decreased since the 1980s, and by the mid-2010s smallholders produced 70% of tree crops. Intensive farming is carried out in highly populated areas, with a variety of land management techniques used to maintain soil productivity.

Subsistence farmers often use 0.1 hectares (0.25 acres) or less. This land is often cleared through slash-and-burn techniques, cultivated for two years, and then left to fallow for five to fifteen years. Alongside crops, pigs, chickens, and ducks are reared. Fish ponds are sometimes used.

Papua New Guinea has the largest yam market in Asia. Other crops produced and consumed domestically include sweet potato, banana, sago, taro, cassava, and sugarcane.

Papua New Guinea produced in 2021:

- 3.0 million tons of palm oil (7th largest world producer);
- 1.8 million tons of coconut (7th largest world producer);
- 1.3 million tons of banana;
- 1.1 million tons of fruits, fresh nes;
- 699 thousand tons of sweet potato (17th largest world producer);
- 371 thousand tons of yam;
- 361 thousand tons of root and tubers;
- 353 thousand tons of sugarcane;
- 322 thousand tons of vegetable;
- 278 thousand tons of taro;
- 247 thousand tons of maize (green);
- 156 thousand tons of cassava;
- 109 thousand tons of berries nes;
- 42 thousand tons of coffee;
- 42 thousand tons of cocoa;

In addition to smaller productions of other agricultural products, like natural rubber (7.7 thousand tons) and tea (5.5 thousand tons).

==== Timber ====
The timber industry was not active in 1998, due to low world prices, but rebounded in 1999. About 40% of the country is covered with timber rich trees, and a domestic woodworking industry has been slow to develop.

As of 2018, over three-quarters of the forest was considered old-growth, 11.9% was heavily logged, and 0.2% had been logged at small-scales.

==== Fish ====
Fish exports are confined primarily to shrimp, although fishing boats of other nations catch tuna in Papua New Guinea waters under license.

The country has inland fisheries and aquaculture. Marine resources include sea cucumber, shrimp, and tuna. There is a domestic shrimp fishing industry, and a tuna longline fishing industry. Deep-water tuna fishing and purse seine fishing is carried out in Papua New Guinea waters by foreign ships.

The overall market is thought to be somewhere between K350 and K400 million per year, although this is highly variable.

=== Industry ===
In general, the Papua New Guinea economy is highly dependent on imports for manufactured goods. Its industrial sector—exclusive of mining—accounts for only 9% of GDP and contributes little to exports. Small-scale industries produce beer, soap, concrete products, clothing, paper products, matches, ice cream, canned meat, fruit juices, furniture, plywood, and paint. The small domestic market, relatively high wages, and high transport costs are constraints to industrial development.

=== Telecommunications ===
Until the second half of 2007, information and communication technology (ICT) services in Papua New Guinea (PNG) were limited to urban centres under the monopoly operator, Telikom PNG (Mitchel 2008). Thereafter, the Irish owned utility Digicel entered the mobile market and expanded mobile signal coverage across the country enabling connectivity to many people — the mobile phone penetration rate reached 41 per cent by 2014, marking a substantial change in the communications landscape. PNG has 42.68 mobile phone users per 100 population, estimated in 2017. PNG has a low level of broadband uptake, estimated in 2017 at 0.213 per 100 population.

=== Energy ===
Particularly in rural areas there is reliance on traditional sources of biomass energy for cooking.

==== Electricity ====
===== Access to electricity =====
By 2017, only 50.42% of the rural population had access to electricity. 80.23% of the urban population in 2017 had access to electricity. Limitations in the transmission and distribution infrastructure lead to frequent outages in urban centers.

Around half of electricity is produced using petroleum products, while most of the rest comes from natural gas, and some comes from renewables (mainly hydropower). As of 2018, around half of the 797MW produced was from private sources, and this was mostly for use in mining.

===== Consumption =====
Electricity - consumption: 3.116 billion kWh (2012 est.)

Most energy consumed comes from petroleum products, and is mostly used by the transport sector.

===== Generation =====
Electricity - production: 3.35 billion kWh (2012 est.)

As of 2018 the country had 8 power stations and 28 substations. Significant sources of energy generation include hydropower and diesel generators, while smaller sources include biogas, natural gas, and geothermal.

===== Transmission and distribution =====
PNG Power Ltd (PPL) operates three separate grids. There are two main large grids, the Port Moresby system serving the National Capital District and the large Ramu grid that extends into the highlands. Also, PPL operates the small Gazelle Peninsula Grid powered mainly by a 10 MW run-of-river hydro plant.

===== Entities and institutions =====
The Electricity Commission (ELCOM) was privatised with the passage of the Electricity Commission (Privatization) Act 2002. PNG Power Limited (PPL) is a vertically integrated utility responsible for generation, transmission, distribution and retailing of electricity throughout Papua New Guinea.

===== Renewable energy =====
A study by Bloomberg New Energy Finance ranked PNG in the top 10 for potential renewable resources, with about 2.5 GW of these but only 2% of it exploited.

====== Hydroelectric projects ======
The Yonki Dam project, which commenced operation in 1991, on the Ramu River has generation capacity of 77 MW (103,000 hp) (Ramu 1) plus proposed additional capacity of 18 MW.

As of 2018, there was 432MW of hydropower capacity.

The list of intended hydroelectric projects include the US$2 billion Ramu 2 hydro project on the Ramu River to be built under a public-private partnership with Shenzhen Energy Group.

Edevu Dam is to be constructed by PNG Hydro Development Ltd (PNGHDL) to generate 50 Megawatts (MW).

Consultants to PNG Power have conducted feasibility studies for the Naoro Brown hydroelectricity Project which would supply up to 80MW of electricity to the Port Moresby grid.

=== Transport ===
The country's mountainous terrain impedes transport. Aeroplanes opened up the country during its colonial period and continue to be used for most travel and most high-density/value freight. The capital, Port Moresby, has no road links to any of PNG's other major towns. Similarly, many remote villages are reachable only by light aircraft or on foot.

Jacksons International Airport is the major international airport in Papua New Guinea, located 8 kilometres (5 mi) from Port Moresby. In addition to two international airfields, Papua New Guinea has over 500 airstrips, most of which are unpaved. 21, including the international airport, are considered national airports. These are operated by the National Airports Corporation. There are six ICAO-certified airports in addition to this, three run by private companies and three by provincial governments. The national airline is Air Niugini, operating out of Jacksons International. As of 2018, Air Niugini flew between 11 of the domestic airports. The second largest airline is PNG Air, and the third is Mission Aviation Fellowship.

In 2010 there were around 46,000 registered vehicles, or 1 per 147 people, including motorcycles. Official statistics suggest this has grown by only 1% a year over the preceding decade. Vehicle registration is carried out at the provincial level, and so may be unreliable and not account for the actual number of vehicles in use. Large goods vehicles make up a fifth to half of highway traffic, followed by passenger vehicles, government vehicles, and private vehicles.

Transport in Papua New Guinea is in many cases heavily limited by the mountainous terrain. The capital, Port Moresby, is not linked by road to any of the other major towns and many highland villages can only be reached by light aircraft or on foot.

Papua New Guinea has no major railways, but some mine sites have disused tracks.

The country has 10,940 km (6,800 mi) of waterways, and commercial port facilities at Port Moresby, Alotau, Oro Bay, Lae, Kimbe, Kieta Madang, Buka, Rabaul/Kokopo, Kiunga, Wewak and Vanimo. In total there are 22 official ports, 16 of which are run by the PNG Port Corporation. Private companies may maintain their own ports, usually to assist extractive industries. International trade routes from East Asia to East Australia pass through Papua New Guinean ports. As of 2010, international trade ships stopped in Papua New Guinean ports 6,330 times.

=== Finance ===
The Bank of Papua New Guinea (BPNG) is the central bank of Papua New Guinea. Its main function is to issue currency and to act as the banker and financial agent to the Government. It is also in charge of regulating banking and other financial services and manages the gold, foreign exchange and any other international reserves of Papua New Guinea.

BPNG is engaged in developing policies to promote financial inclusion and is a member of the Alliance for Financial Inclusion, which had been formed in 2008. In 2013, BPNG made a Maya Declaration Commitment to create an enabling environment for building an inclusive financial sector in Papua New Guinea.

The currency of Papua New Guinean, issued by the BPNG, is the kina, which was introduced on 19 April 1975 to replace the Australian dollar.

=== Science and technology ===
Papua New Guinea's National Vision 2050 was adopted in 2009. This has led to the establishment of the Research, Science and Technology Council. At its gathering in November 2014, the Council re-emphasised the need to focus on sustainable development through science and technology.

Vision 2050's medium-term priorities are:

- emerging industrial technology for downstream processing;
- infrastructure technology for the economic corridors;
- knowledge-based technology;
- science and engineering education; and
- to reach the target of investing 5% of GDP in research and development by 2050. (Papua New Guinea invested 0.03% of GDP in research and development in 2016.)

In 2016, women accounted for 33.2% of researchers in Papua New Guinea.

According to Thomson Reuters' Web of Science, Papua New Guinea had the largest number of publications (110) among Pacific Island states in 2014, followed by Fiji (106). Nine out of ten scientific publications from Papua New Guinea focused on immunology, genetics, biotechnology and microbiology. Nine out of ten were also co-authored by scientists from other countries, mainly Australia, the United States of America, the United Kingdom, Spain and Switzerland. In 2019 Papua New Guinea produced 253 publications in the Scopus (Elsevier) database of scientific publications. Health sciences accounted for 49% of these publications. Papua New Guinea's top scientific collaborators from 2017 to 2019 were Australia, the United States of America, the United Kingdom, France and India.

Renewable energy sources represent two-thirds of the total electricity supply. In 2015, the Secretariat of the Pacific Community observed that, 'while Fiji, Papua New Guinea, and Samoa are leading the way with large-scale hydropower projects, there is enormous potential to expand the deployment of other renewable energy options such as solar, wind, geothermal and ocean-based energy sources'. The European Union funded the Renewable Energy in Pacific Island Countries Developing Skills and Capacity programme (EPIC) over 2013 to 2017. The programme developed a master's programme in renewable energy management, accredited in 2016, at the University of Papua New Guinea and helped to establish a Centre of Renewable Energy at the same university.

Papua New Guinea is one of the 15 beneficiaries of a programme on Adapting to Climate Change and Sustainable Energy worth €37.26 million. The programme resulted from the signing of an agreement in February 2014 between the European Union and the Pacific Islands Forum Secretariat. The other beneficiaries are the Cook Islands, Fiji, Kiribati, Marshall Islands, Federated States of Micronesia, Nauru, Niue, Palau, Samoa, Solomon Islands, Timor-Leste, Tonga, Tuvalu and Vanuatu.

== Trade and investment ==
Exports of Papua New Guinea by product category (2019) Chemical products Transportation Machines Mineral products Plastics and rubbers Metals Foodstuffs Precious metals Textiles Instruments Animal products Vegetable products Paper goods Footwear and headwear Miscellaneous Stone and glass Wood products Animal and vegetable bi-products Animal hides Arts and antiques Weapons

In 2014, Papua New Guinea's merchandise exports were:

- 41% fuels and mining;
- 23.8% agriculture;
- 6.2% manufacturing; and
- 29% other.

Major destinations for merchandise exports include Australia (39.9%), the European Union (20.2%), Japan (11.7%), China (6.7%), and Singapore (5.6%).

In 2014, Papua New Guinea's merchandise imports were:

- 17.8% fuels and mining;
- 11.4% agriculture;
- 69.4% manufacturing; and
- 1.4% other.

Major source countries for merchandise imports include Australia (34.4%), Singapore (14.3%), the European Union (8.3%), China (6.9%), and Japan (6.4%).

Petroleum, mining machinery and aircraft have been the primary U.S. exports to Papua New Guinea. In 1999, as mineral exploration and new minerals investments declined, as did United States exports. Crude oil is the largest U.S. import from Papua New Guinea, followed by gold, cocoa, coffee, and copper ore.

U.S. companies are active in developing Papua New Guinea's mining and petroleum sectors. Chevron operates the Kutubu and Gobe oil projects and is developing its natural gas reserves. A 5,000–6,000 m^{3} (30,000–40,000 barrel) per day oil refinery project in which there is an American interest also is under development in Port Moresby.

In 1993, Papua New Guinea became a participating economy in the Asia-Pacific Economic Cooperation (APEC) Forum. In 1996, it joined the World Trade Organization (WTO).

== Development programs and aid ==
Papua New Guinea is highly dependent on foreign aid. Australia has been the largest bilateral aid donor to PNG, providing $A506 million ($US376 million) in 2016. Budgetary support, which has been provided in decreasing amounts since independence, was phased out in 2000, with aid concentrated on project development.

Other major aid sources to Papua New Guinea are Japan, the European Union, the People's Republic of China, the Republic of China, the United Nations, the Asian Development Bank, the International Monetary Fund, and the World Bank. Volunteers from a number of countries, including the United States, and mission church workers also provide education, health, and development assistance throughout the country.

In July 2024 The International Monetary Fund would provide Papua New Guinea with immediate access to about $125 million in order "to support Papua New Guinea’s reform agenda, help protect the vulnerable and foster inclusive growth, with a focus maintained on strengthening debt sustainability, alleviating FX shortages, and enhancing governance and anti-corruption frameworks,"

Many countries and international organisations have supported climate change-related activities.

== Land tenure ==
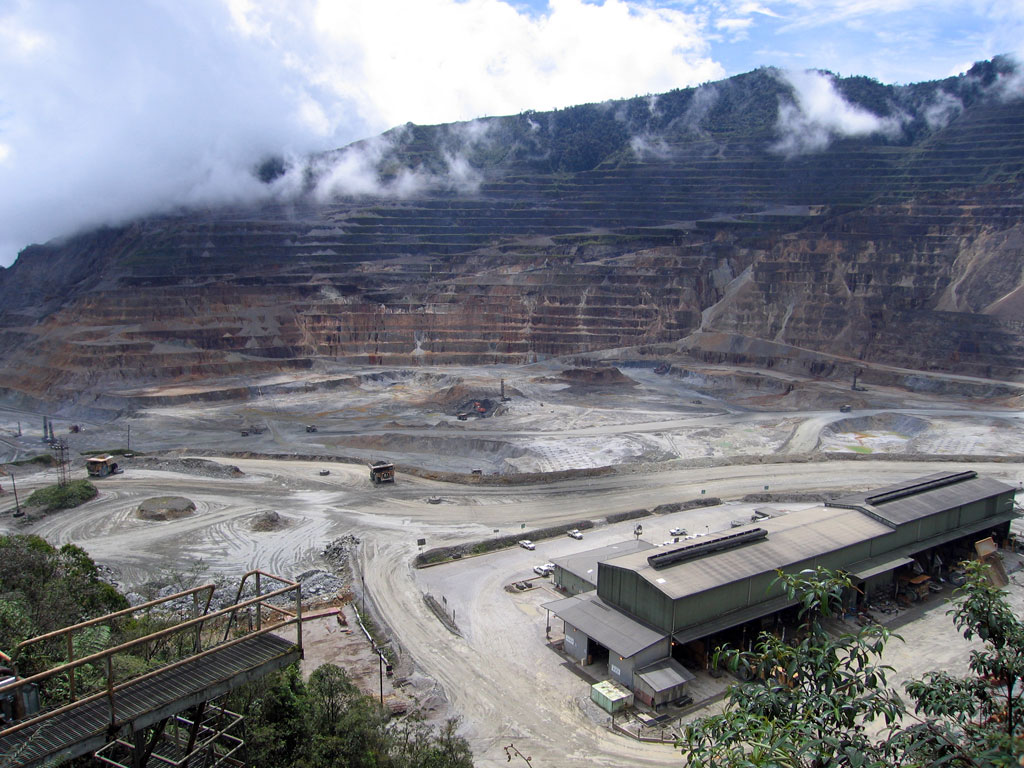
The Ok Tedi Mine in southwestern Papua New Guinea

Over 97% of the country designated as customary land, held by communities. Many such effective titles remain unregistered and effectively informal. Land registration efforts have had very limited success.

The PNG legislature has enacted laws in which a type of tenure called "customary land title" is recognised, meaning that the traditional lands of the indigenous peoples have some legal basis for inalienable tenure. This customary land notionally covers most of the usable land in the country (some 97% of total land area); alienated land is either held privately under state lease or is government land. Freehold title (also known as fee simple) can only be held by Papua New Guinean citizens.

Only some 3% of the land of Papua New Guinea is in private hands; this is privately held under a 99-year state lease, or it is held by the State. There is virtually no freehold title; the few existing freeholds are automatically converted to state leases when they are transferred between vendor and purchaser. Unalienated land is owned under customary title by traditional landowners. The precise nature of the seisin varies from one culture to another. Many writers portray land as the communal ownership of traditional clans; however, closer studies usually show that the smallest portions of land whose ownership cannot be further divided are held by the individual heads of extended families and their descendants or their descendants alone if they have recently died.

This is a matter of vital importance because a problem of economic development is identifying the membership of customary landowning groups and the owners. Disputes between mining and forestry companies and landowner groups often devolve on the issue of whether the companies entered into contractual relations for the use of land with the true owners. Customary property—usually land—cannot be devised by will. It can only be inherited according to the custom of the deceased's people. The Lands Act was amended in 2010 along with the Land Group Incorporation Act, intended to improve the management of state land, mechanisms for dispute resolution over land, and to enable customary landowners to be better able to access finance and possible partnerships over portions of their land if they seek to develop it for urban or rural economic activities. The Land Group Incorporation Act requires more specific identification of the customary landowners than hitherto and their more specific authorisation before any land arrangements are determined; (a major issue in recent years has been a land grab, using, or rather misusing, the Lease-Leaseback provision under the Land Act, notably using 'Special Agricultural and Business Leases' (SABLs) to acquire vast tracts of customary land, purportedly for agricultural projects, but in almost all cases as a back-door mechanism for securing tropical forest resources for logging—circumventing the more exacting requirements of the Forest Act, for securing Timber Permits (which must comply with sustainability requirements and be competitively secured, and with the customary landowners' approval). Following a national outcry, these SABLs have been subject to a Commission of Inquiry, established in mid-2011, for which the report is still awaited for initial presentation to the Prime Minister and Parliament.

== Economic conditions ==
By mid-1999, Papua New Guinea's economy was in crisis. Although its agricultural sector had recovered from the 1997 drought and timber prices were rising as most Asian economies recovered from their 1998 slump, Papua New Guinea's foreign currency earnings suffered from low world mineral and petroleum prices. Estimates of minerals in exploration expenditure in 1999 were one-third of what was spent in 1997. The resulting lower foreign exchange earnings, capital flight, and general government mismanagement resulted in a precipitous drop in the value of Papua New Guinea's currency, the kina, leading to a dangerous decrease in foreign currency reserves. The kina has floated since 1994. Economic activity decreased in most sectors; imports of all kinds shrunk; and inflation, which had been over 21% in 1998, slowed to an estimated annual rate of 8% in 1999.

Citing the previous government's failure to successfully negotiate acceptable commercial loans or bond sales to cover its budget deficit, the government formed by Sir Mekere Morauta in July 1999 successfully requested emergency assistance from the International Monetary Fund and the World Bank. With assistance from the Fund and the Bank, the government has made considerable progress toward macroeconomic stabilization and economic reform.

As of 2019, although statistics show that an economic recovery is underway, Papua New Guinea's economy is still struggling.

The rugged terrain (including high mountain ranges and valleys, swamps and islands) and the high cost of developing infrastructure, combined with other factors (including law and order problems in some centres and the system of customary land title) make it difficult for outside developers. Local developers are hindered by years of deficient investment in education, health, and access to finance.

The country's terrain has made it difficult for the country to develop transportation infrastructure, resulting in air travel being the most efficient and reliable means of transportation. There are five highways, although only two go into the interior. Domestic shipping is limited. There are 22 international ports, although not all are operational. The biggest is Lae Port, which handles about half of all international cargo. Many roads are poorly maintained, and some cannot be used during the wet season. Nonetheless, the majority of the population lives within 5 kilometres (3.1 mi) of a national road, and even more live near district or rural roads.

Overall housing quality is low, with 15% of houses having a finished floor in the late 2010s. In urban areas, 55% of houses were connected to electricity in 2016. Rural areas saw only 10% connection, although this is a significant increase from 3% in 1996. Over half of urban houses had access to piped water, while only 15% of rural houses did, although rural houses had more access to wells. The average number of people per room was 2.5.

The Sirinumu Dam and Yonki Dam provide some hydropower. There is limited sewage treatment, even in the capital. Some is discharged directly into the ocean, leading to issues with pollution.

Former Prime Minister Sir Mekere Morauta tried to restore integrity to state institutions, stabilise the kina, restore stability to the national budget, privatise public enterprises where appropriate, and ensure ongoing peace on Bougainville following the 1997 agreement which ended Bougainville's secessionist unrest. The Morauta government had considerable success in attracting international support, specifically gaining the backing of the International Monetary Fund (IMF) and the World Bank in securing development assistance loans.

The PNG government's long-term Vision 2050 and shorter-term policy documents, including the 2013 Budget and the 2014 Responsible Sustainable Development Strategy, emphasise the need for a more diverse economy, based upon sustainable industries and avoiding the effects of Dutch disease from major resource extraction projects undermining other industries. This occurred in many countries experiencing oil or other mineral booms, notably in Western Africa, undermining much of their agriculture sector, manufacturing and tourism, and with them broad-based employment prospects. Measures have been taken to mitigate these effects, including through the establishment of a sovereign wealth fund, partly to stabilise revenue and expenditure flows, but much will depend upon the readiness to make real reforms to effective use of revenue, tackling rampant corruption and empowering households and businesses to access markets, services and develop a more buoyant economy, with lower costs, especially for small to medium-sized enterprises. Economic 'development' based on the extractive industries also carries difficult consequences for local communities. One major project conducted through the PNG Department for Community Development suggested that other pathways to sustainable development should be considered.

The Institute of National Affairs, a PNG independent policy think tank, provides a report on the business and investment environment of Papua New Guinea every five years, based upon a survey of large and small, local and overseas companies, highlighting law and order problems and corruption, as the worst impediments, followed by the poor state of transport, power and communications infrastructure.

=== Main indicators ===
The following table shows the main economic indicators in 1980-2026. Inflation below 5% is in green.

Year	GDP			GDP growth (real)	Inflation	Government debt (% of GDP)
Year	Total (bil. US$ PPP)	Per capita (US$ PPP)	Total (bil. US$ nominal)	GDP growth (real)	Inflation	Government debt (% of GDP)
1980	3.2	1074	4.1	▼−2.3%	▲12.1%	n/a
1985	▲4.4	▲1333	▼3.3	▲3.6%	▲3.7%	n/a
1990	▲5.5	▲1471	▲4.8	▼−3.1%	▲7.0%	n/a
1995	▲9.4	▲2082	▲7.1	▼−3.4%	▲17.3%	▲37%
2000	▲10.6	▼2068	▼5.2	▼−2.5%	▲15.6%	▲42%
2005	▲13.6	▲2347	▲7.3	▲4.3%	▲1.8%	▼32%
2006	▲14.3	▲2423	▲8.4	▲2.5%	▲2.4%	▼26%
2007	▲15.9	▲2622	▲9.5	▲7.8%	▲0.9%	▼22%
2008	▲16.1	▼2604	▲11.7	▼−0.3%	▲10.8%	22%
2009	▲17.3	▲2736	▼11.6	▲6.8%	▲6.9%	22%
2010	▲19.3	▲2868	▲14.3	▲10.1%	▲5.1%	▼17%
2011	▲20.0	▼2749	▲18.0	▲1.1%	▲4.4%	▼16%
2012	▲21.3	▲2792	▲21.3	▲4.7%	▲4.5%	▲19%
2013	▲22.5	▲2809	21.3	▲3.8%	▲5.0%	▲25%
2014	▲25.9	▲3091	▲23.2	▲13.5%	▲5.2%	▲27%
2015	▲27.9	▲3168	▼21.7	▲6.6%	▲6.0%	▲30%
2016	▲29.7	▲3214	▼20.8	▲5.5%	▲6.7%	▲34%
2017	▲31.3	▲3227	▲22.7	▲3.5%	▲5.4%	▼33%
2018	▲31.9	▼3136	▲24.1	▼−0.3%	▲4.4%	▲37%
2019	▲33.9	▲3173	▲24.8	▲4.5%	▲3.9%	▲38%
2020	▼33.3	▼2966	▼23.8	▼−3.2%	▲4.9%	▲49%
2021	▲34.6	▼2939	▲26.1	▼−0.5%	▲4.5%	▲53%
2022	▲39.2	▲3260	▲31.7	▲5.7%	▲5.3%	▼48%
2023	▲42.2	▲3437	▼30.7	▲3.8%	▲2.3%	▲54%
2024	▲44.9	▲3584	▲30.8	▲3.9%	▲0.6%	▼53%
2025	▲48.8	▲3813	▲32.5	▲5.6%	▲4.4%	▼52%
2026	▲52.1	▲3986	▲34.4	▲3.8%	▲5.0%	▼49%

== Statistics ==
Household income or consumption by percentage share:
lowest 10%: 4.3%
highest 10%: 36% (2008)

Labour force: 2.078 million

Electricity – production: 2,200 GWh (2008)

Electricity – production by source:
fossil fuel: 67.78%
hydro: 32.22%
nuclear: 0%
other: 0% (2008)

Electricity – consumption: 2,000 GWh (2008)

Electricity exports: 10 kWh (2008)

Electricity – imports: 0 kWh (2008)

Agriculture – products: coffee, cocoa, coconuts, palm kernels, tea, rubber, sweet potatoes, fruit, vegetables; poultry, pork, vanilla

Currency: 1 kina (K) = 100 toea

Exchange rates: kina (K) per US$1 – 3.14 (April 2016), 2.7624 (November 1999), 2.520 (1999), 2.058 (1998), 1.434 (1997), 1.318 (1996), 1.276 (1995)

== See also ==
- COVID-19 pandemic in Papua New Guinea
