= 1994 Papua New Guinea financial crisis =

1994 economic and financial crisis

Papua New Guinea suffered a financial crisis in 1994, due to a large budget deficit and a lack of foreign exchange reserves. In mid-1994, the deficit reached 11% of GDP, and the Bank of Papua New Guinea announced it would no longer provide loans to the government. Emergency measures to curb government spending were implemented in 1994, and from 1995 the country obtained international support to implement economic reforms.

The country's national debt and deficit rose throughout the early 1990s, during a time when Australian budgetary support was declining and the formerly very profitable Panguna mine was closed. The increased government expenditures did not translate into improved public services, with health and education declining. These years saw historically high levels of capital flight. At the end of 1993, foreign reserves were reduced to just two weeks of expenditures. While deficits continued to increase, in early 1994 tax revenue decreased, and both the central bank and international financial institutions warned of a pending economic crisis.

The government took a number of measures to cut spending, including changing how government expenditures were approved and delaying non-salary payments. These actions impacted both the public and private sectors, reducing public services and depressing private economic activity. An unrelated change of government at the end of August was followed by the new government implementing further measures, including selling off its stakes in some companies, and devaluing the Papua New Guinean kina. The kina was eventually fully floated.

In 1995 the government entered a multi-year economic reform programme funded by foreign loans. This sought to provide economic stability and increase investment. Government expenditures were restructured, non-tariff barriers to trade were reduced, and public services were devolved to provinces and districts. Overall, the budget deficit decreased and even achieved a small surplus, and the economy began to grow again. Nonetheless, growth remained slow until the early 2000s.

== Background ==
Papua New Guinean government debt sharply rose in the early 1990s, with external debt increasing 50% from 1989 to 1993, while domestic debt almost tripled from 1989 to 1994. The deficit rose from 1.2% of GDP in 1989 to 5.9% in 1993.

Some of this change was a result of decreased revenue. The Panguna mine's closure due to the Bougainville conflict reduced revenue from 1990 onwards, while the same conflict also necessitated increased expenditure for recovery efforts. That single closure reduced government tax revenue by 20%, causing by itself a minor economic crisis, although this was alleviated slightly in 1991, following the opening of the Porgera Gold Mine. Nonetheless, the overall budget had become heavily reliant on oil alone. The recovery of mineral income likely prompted more government spending and borrowing in 1993 and 1994, which sought to diversify the market. This was initially successful, with GDP growing 16% in 1993. The government at this time removed tuition fees, increased public salaries, and reduced taxes. However, commodity prices overall decreased starting in 1990, and oil prices declined in late 1993 and early 1994.

Australia reduced its monetary support during this period, from K311.7 million in 1991 to K184 million in 1993, as part of an overall movement towards removing budgetary support entirely and switching to project aid. The short tenure of most Papua New Guinean governments, often around 18 months, meant that decision-making was often short-term. Government reforms made in 1989 as part of a loan agreement with the World Bank Group were partially reversed in 1992.

Between 1991 and 1994, government expenses exceeded targets multiple times. Much of the government expenditure during this time went towards recurring expenses, leading to a decline in infrastructure investment as well as in health and education services. Public services declined in the late 1980s and early 1990s, despite the increased spending. However, there was also an increasing amount of unplanned expenditure, which was 14.3% of spending in 1992, 18% in 1993, and 23.4% in the first half of 1994. These repeated budget deficits were likely linked to high levels of capital flight from 1990 to 1994, larger than any previous capital outflow. Foreign reserves were just US$40 million at the end of 1993, enough for only two weeks of non-mining imports.

As the economic situation began to deteriorate, an emergency mini-budget was produced in March 1994, increasing taxes and decreasing spending, although this did not halt the growing crisis. In the first half of 1994 the deficit reached 11% of GDP, up from 6% in 1993. This was a result of both increased spending and lower than expected revenue. Some of this deficit was financed through borrowing, exceeding the legal lending limits of the Bank of Papua New Guinea (albeit not for the first time). Government reserves also decreased. A deficit of K277.5 million was greater than the expected deficit for the whole year. At the same time, revenue for the first half of 1994 was 2.6% lower than the same period in 1993. Although in March 1994 the new finance minister who had replaced Julius Chan in January 1994 increased taxes and took actions to reduce expenditures, breaking from Chan's budgets, in June 1994 warnings of a financial crisis were issued by the Bank of Papua New Guinea, as well as the World Bank Group, the International Monetary Fund, and the Asian Development Bank.

== Government response ==
In response to the growing fiscal crisis, the Bank of Papua New Guinea suspended additional financing of the government. In response on 17 July, the government changed financial practices, requiring all government departments to have payments authorised by the Department of Finance, instead of the previous practice of being able to authorise payments themselves. The government also delayed what it considered non-essential payments, such as purchases from some private companies and the transfer of funds to provincial governments. These actions effectively put the government in arrears, although they prevented the need to further borrow money.

In August 1994 the government devalued the kina. Minister of Finance and Planning Masket Iangalio issued a statement saying continued expenditure at the same rate would cause bankruptcy. A supreme court ruling on 25 August saw Paias Wingti's position as prime minister declared void, leading to a change in government. Julius Chan was subsequently elected prime minister on 30 August. Chris Haiveta became deputy prime minister and Minister for Finance and Planning.

The new government instituted a wage and recruitment freeze, and announced it would sell off government stakes in some natural resource projects. The government's delay of payments meant that some government staff, especially those working for provincial governments, were not paid on time. Already pressured public services were further strained, and in November the health minister stated 10 provincial hospitals lacked sufficient funding to remain open. The ceasing of all regular expenditure outside of salaries effectively stopped the provision of a lot of services. In August, police forces in Mount Hagen did not have enough fuel to operate all their vehicles. Stores in that area would not accept government cheques as payment. The provincial commander of Chimbu Province police stated that he purchased fuel with his own money. In September, the police commissioner stood down 1,000 reservists and withdrew 200 vehicles. These cuts were blamed in October for a rise in robberies in Port Moresby. In November, police in Port Moresby stated that a curfew to help tackle raskol gangs would be too expensive. The prime minister pledged to increase police numbers in December. Financial issues also afflicted the judiciary, with increasing backlogs in Lae and Port Moresby caused by a shortage of magistrates and a shortage of vehicles for the transporting of prisoners. Four prisons had their water cut off due to unpaid bills, and in December 400 prisoners were released to cut costs.

The government made up a significant proportion of the economy, and so the growing financial crisis had significant knock-on effects. The increase of government arrears led to an increase in private sector lending to cover shortfalls, a reduction in private sector purchases, and lower confidence in the government. On 12 September, government departments were barred from committing to any future purchases. Some private sector workers in companies whose payments had been delayed were laid off.

The financial crisis peaked in September and October, during which the government almost ran out of foreign exchange reserves. In mid-September the kina was devalued by 12%, and on 10 October it became a fully floating currency. These devaluations caused capital flight, with investors not feeling assured that the devaluation went far enough. The resulting flotation meant that the "hard kina" policy under which the kina was pegged to a basket of currencies, which had been implemented when Julius Chan was the country's first finance minister, was officially abandoned. The kina continued to depreciate into 1995, ending up at 40% below its former value. The government gave the Bank of Papua New Guinea greater powers, and increased the penalties for financial offences. The bank raised minimum liquidity requirements for commercial banks from 11% to 29%, among other actions taken to stabilise finances. Relief efforts for the 1994 Rabaul twin volcanic eruptions added pressure on government expenditure.

Australia provided an emergency loan of AU$111 million, however this was soon used up. On 16 December government departments were again restricted from making any further purchasing commitments. At the end of 1994, arrears reached a total of K206 million. An additional K152 million was borrowed from the central bank, and K30 million was raised through the sale of government shares in the Ok Tedi Mine. The remaining K24 million was covered through existing government finances, and by 20 January 1995 the arrears were all paid. This settling of arrears began to have wider effects in the economy in the first quarter of 1995, including through a repayment of private sector loans that had been taken out in 1994, and an increase in private sector purchases.

== Economic reforms ==
After the kina was floated, appeals were made to the World Bank Group and International Monetary Fund (IMF) for financial support. Structural reforms to the economy were included in the March 1995 budget, alongside other reform measures. The World Bank provided advice on these measures, and loaned US$50 million towards their implementation. This loan came alongside expectations that the government would work with the IMF, and the government borrowed from the IMF at different points from July 1995 to December 1996, and also borrowed from the Japan Export-Import Bank and the Australian Treasury. The IMF provided US$71.5 million, the Japan Export-Import Bank US$45 million, and Australia US$50 million.

Negotiations with the World Bank and IMF were opposed by parts of the public. This led to the country's first ever public sector strike in March 1995, which involved 18,000 teachers. Despite this opposition, the government came to an agreement with the financing institutions in April. The provision of financial assistance came with reform requirements, which the government had little choice but to accept. The reform programme was intended to restore economic stability and increase investor confidence. To this end it sought to reduce the fiscal deficit, improve government financial management, privatise some government assets and incentivise private investment, improve the mining and forestry sectors, restructure public services while increasing investment and greater transfers to poorer provinces, and improve emergency relief services. The government response to the 1994 Rabaul twin volcanic eruptions provided lessons for future emergency relief activities. The added pressure on government expenditure caused by this eruption increased the need for external financial support. The reform programme also mandated government expenditure go to specific areas: 25% to education, 25% to health, and 25% to agriculture and renewable resources. The financing bodies initially sought to eliminate the funding pots controlled by individual MPs, which created significant opportunities for patronage-politics and corruption. However, this reform was rejected by the government.

Government expenditure exceeded targets in 1995 due to education and defence and foreign affairs expenditures. Some of these expenditures were rolled over into the 1996 budget. Part of this reflected the World Bank requirements to increase investments, despite IMF measures requiring less public expenditure. Following flotation, the value of the kina remained low compared to its value before the crisis. Growth returned to the wider non-mining economy, with manufacturing and construction beginning to grow again in 1996.

By 1996, the fiscal deficit had been reduced, government expenditure was better controlled, interest rates were set by the market, non-tariff barriers to trade were replaced with tariffs, the overall level of tariffs was reduced, and the forestry sector was reformed with a logging code of conduct and a new revenue system. The slow pace of reform in the forestry sector led to the firing of the head of the National Forest Authority in October 1995. On 22 November 1995, quotas on meat imports were replaced by a 40% flat tariff, and the same occurred for cement imports in January 1996. In the 1996 budget only a single line of appropriation was given to each government department, with the departments instead having to submit detailed budgets to the Department of Finance. Prior to the reforms, government bookkeeping was seen as arbitrary, and many current expenditures were allocated to earlier time periods. The reforms sought to increase accountability, but lacked enforcement mechanisms.

Part of the reform package included an assessment of the Organic Law on Provincial and Local Level Governments. The decentralisation efforts under the new organic law eliminated the previous provincial governments, reforming them with members of the national parliament and representatives from district governments. These changes were intended to improve funding distribution while increasing community participation, however a lack of institutional and financial support meant that the new governments lacked capacity, limiting their ability and creating new opportunities for corruption and mismanagement. In some senses, the new law in actuality shifted more power towards the national government. The passing of the organic law occurred in the face of significant public opposition, likely contributing to the failure of subsequent contentious efforts to reform land laws.

Reforms to the civil service announced in 1995 sought to both reduce the overall size of the civil service while devolving responsibilities from the national level to provincial and district ones. The government hoped to achieve a 7.5% headcount reduction of 4,500 positions, achieved in part by reviewing payrolls to remove non-existent workers, and by not hiring to fill vacancies. While civil service salaries rose 10% in January 1996, above the planned 6%, the floating kina led to inflation in 1995 and 1996 that effectively reduced public sector wages by 18%. Overall real wages went down about 12%.

In 1995 the government sold the company Roadco, and its shares in Ramu sugar. It also sold stakes in the forestry and mineral sectors. GDP in 1995 decreased by 2.9%. In 1996 GDP rose 2.2%, more than the 1.4% expected, mostly due to growth in the mineral sector. After a 0.5% budget deficit in 1995 (compared to 11% in mid-1994), in 1996 the government had a budget surplus of 0.6% of GDP rather than the expected 1% deficit. Inflation dropped from 17.3% in 1995 to 11.6% in 1996, although this was still higher than was hoped for. Foreign exchange reserves recovered to US$549 million, enough for 5.6 months of non-mineral imports. Public services continued to deteriorate over this time.

The World Bank loan was divided into two tranches, the first US$25 million delivered in 1995, and the second to be delivered later following the implementation of reforms. 1996 saw public disputes break out between the government and the IMF and World Bank. In particular, the World Bank felt that reforms to forestry management that vested power in the Forestry Minister rather than the National Forestry Agency needed to be repealed. On 17 April 1996 The World Bank informed the government that it would cancel the loan if further changes were not made, citing the slow implementation of measures such as decentralisation. Meanwhile, while the 1996 budget ostensibly eliminated the individual MP funds, they were replaced by a new mechanism under a new name which provided essentially the same function. The Papua New Guinea finance minister negotiated with the bank in September, and a new forestry bill was passed on 8 October. Overall, the World Bank assessed that five of its nine conditions for the loan had been fulfilled. However, following negotiations it waived the need for the remaining four to be completed, citing steps taken towards their completion. In the end, an agreement was reached under which the second tranche of the loan was disbursed in January 1997. In December 1996, the IMF agreed to extend its agreement until December 1997.

== Legacy ==
The economic and financial crisis Papua New Guinea faced in 1994 was regarded as "unprecedented". Its impacts lasted longer than those of previous financial crises in the country. The financial crisis was the primary event that led Prime Minister Julius Chan to call 1994 "the most turbulent, painful and, at times, unpredictable year ever experienced by PNG in its 19 years as an independent state" in his Christmas message. Subsequent economic reforms sought to expand the non-mining parts of the economy. When presenting the 1997 budget, the finance minister stated "we are only at the beginning of the beginning. There is still a long way to go." Natural disasters such as a severe drought and some tropical storms greatly damaged agriculture in 1997, with the drought extending into 1998. The 1997 Sandline affair exposed corruption in the government coupled with a disregard for financial rules, leading to Chan's resignation and a loss of public confidence in government. On 19 November 1997, the new government under prime minister Bill Skate instituted a one-year wage and hiring freeze. Nonetheless, the Skate government became viewed as interventionist and uninterested in the rule of law, and saw multiple breaches of financial laws. In 1998 the Bank of Papua New Guinea again exceeded its statutory lending limits.

The 1997 Asian financial crisis impacted the economy in 1998 and 1999. This reduced international forestry prices, and the industry pressured the government to repeal past forestry reforms, reducing government revenue from log exports while benefiting private companies. Substantial tariff reform was finally passed in 1998, although with an eight-year phasing in period. However, the Skate government also reversed some previous tariff reforms. In 1998 the deficit was larger than expected, and the 1999 budget provoked significant unrest in its measures to manage this. Attempts to reduce civil service size were both opposed and poorly implemented, and tax revenue came in lower than expected. Privitisation was delayed, and the deficit again grew in 1999. The government faced a number of strikes amid wider civil unrest, and in December 1998 adjourned parliament to avoid a vote of no confidence. A broad-based consumption tax was envisioned as part of economic reforms, and a Goods and Services Tax was introduced on 1 July 1999. In July 1999, Skate was replaced by Mekere Morauta, who soon passed a new budget in an attempt to stabilise the economy. In 2000 the Moruata government reached a new agreement with the World Bank, effectively ending the 1995 reform programme.

Overall while the reform programme saw a small number of successful changes, they were tenuous and at risk of being reversed or undermined by the Chan and Skate governments. The economy remained heavily reliant on mineral exports, and living standards did not substantially improve. Economic growth remained subdued until 2002, when commodity prices increased.
