= Baime Hydro Power Station =

Hydroelectric power plant in Morobe, Papua New Guinea

- Country: Papua New Guinea
- Location: Morobe Province
- Coordinates: 7°06′46.0″S 146°40′03.4″E
- Status: Operational
- Commission date: 2023

Power generation
- Nameplate capacity: 5.8 MW x 2 =11.6 MW
- Annual net output: 81 GWh

The Durgun Hydro Power Station is an 11.6 megawatts hydroelectric power station in Morobe Province, Papua New Guinea.

== History ==
The feasibility study for the construction of this power station started in 2014. In 2023, it was commissioned.

== Technical specifications ==
The power station has a generation capacity of 11.6 MW. It can produce up to 81 GWh of electricity annually. It consists of two Pelton turbines with 5.8MW installed capacity for each.

== See also ==
- Energy in Papua New Guinea
