= Henry ToRobert =

Papua New Guinea banker and public servant

Sir Henry ToRobert GCL KBE

President of the Papua New Guinea Olympic Committee
- In office 1980–2012

Governor of the Bank of Papua New Guinea
- In office 1973–1993
- Succeeded by: Mekere Morauta

Personal details
- Born: 22 October 1942 East New Britain Province, Papua New Guinea
- Died: 18 October 2018 (Aged 75)
- Spouse: Lady Janet ToRobert
- Children: 5

Sir Henry ToRobert GCL KBE (22 October 1942 – 18 October 2018) was a Papua New Guinean civil servant who was the first governor of the Bank of Papua New Guinea. He also played a major role in developing the Credit Corporation (PNG) Ltd and was president of the Papua New Guinea Olympic Committee for 30 years.

== Early life and education ==
Henry Thomas ToRobert, an ethnic Tolai, was born in the village of Romale in what is now the East New Britain Province of Papua New Guinea (PNG), on 22 October 1942. This was at a time during World War II when Japanese forces had just captured the area. A bright child, he went to Vuvu Secondary school on the Gazelle Peninsula at the age of ten and at the age of 14 was awarded a full scholarship by the Australian government to attend St. Brendan's College, Yeppoon in Queensland. His fellow student there was John Momis, who would become President of the Autonomous Region of Bougainville in PNG. After graduating from St. Brendan's, he went to the Australian School of Pacific Administration (ASOPA) in Sydney with the intention of training as a teacher. However, two weeks after arriving there he learnt that he had received a full scholarship from the Reserve Bank of Australia to study at the University of Sydney. He graduated with a degree in economics, being the first Papua New Guinean to obtain a degree in that subject and only the second to receive a degree from an Australian university.

== Career ==
In 1967, ToRobert returned to what was, at the time, the Territory of Papua and New Guinea, and started work in Port Moresby for the Reserve Bank of Australia. In 1973, just a month before Papua New Guinea became self-governing, he became the Governor of the Bank of Papua New Guinea, a position he would hold until 1993. On 16 September 1975, PNG became independent. From 19 May 1975, the new currency, the Kina, was introduced. This circulated along with the Australian dollar until 31 December 1975, when the latter ceased to be legal tender. ToRobert was responsible for overseeing the transfer. He paid particular attention to ensuring that all coins had designs that illustrated an animal unique to PNG, i.e., a turtle, cuscus, cassowary and crocodile. The one-kina coin has a hole in the middle, inspired by the shell that was often used for trading in the country at the time.

After leaving the Bank of PNG in 1993, ToRobert became the chair of Credit Corporation (PNG) Ltd, building it up to be one of PNG's most-successful companies, before resigning in 2007 to compete unsuccessfully in the national elections as a candidate of the New Generation Party for Kokopo in East New Britain. He became a trustee of the Papua New Guinea Institute of National Affairs, a private-sector-funded think-tank, chair of the Institute of Applied Social and Economic Research, now known as the Papua New Guinea National Research Institute, and chair of the management board of the PNG Bankers' College. He was managing director of PNG's Privatization Commission and chair of the Gazelle Restoration Authority, which was established in 1995 after the 1994 volcanic eruption of Mount Tavurvur.

A keen rugby player and golfer, ToRobert was president of the Papua New Guinea Olympic Committee from 1980 to 2000 and from 2003 to 2012. Among other sporting roles, he was president of the PNG Softball Association.

== Awards and honours ==
ToRobert was made a Knight Commander of the Order of the British Empire (KBE) in the 1981 Birthday Honours at the age of 39. In 2015, Papua New Guinea made him a Grand Companion of the Order of Logohu (GCL), the highest PNG award, which allowed him to be referred to as "Chief".

In 1991, the Bank of Papua New Guinea opened a new headquarters, and the building was named "ToRobert Haus". In 2013, his image appeared on a Kina 6.00 stamp, as one several stamps produced to celebrate the 40th anniversary of the Bank. Another of the stamps included a picture of ToRobert Haus.

== Death ==
ToRobert died on 18 October 2018 and was buried in his home village of Ramale in East New Britain Province. He was survived by his four children from previous marriages, Ezzard, Louis, Henry Jr., and Charmaine, as well as by his wife, Lady Janet ToRobert.
