= Papua New Guinean kina =

Currency of Papua New Guinea

- Commemorative K50 Note

ISO 4217
- Code: PGK (numeric: 598)
- Subunit: 0.01

Unit
- Plural: kina
- Symbol: K

Denominations
- Subunit
- 1/100: toea
- Plural
- toea: toea
- Symbol
- toea: t
- Banknotes: K2, K5, K10, K20, K50, K100
- Coins: 5t, 10t, 20t, 50t, K1, K2

Demographics
- Date of introduction: 19 April 1975
- User(s): Papua New Guinea

Issuance
- Central bank: Bank of Papua New Guinea
- Website: www.bankpng.gov.pg

Valuation
- Inflation: 1.8%
- Source: The World Factbook, 2007 est.

The Kina (ISO 4217 currency code: PGK, the currency symbol: K) is the currency of Papua New Guinea. It is divided into 100 toea. The name Kina is derived from Kuanua language of the Tolai region, referring to a pearl shell used widely for trading in both the Coastal and Highlands areas of the country.

== History ==
The kina was introduced on 19 April 1975 and circulated along with the Australian dollar until 31 December 1975. The two currencies were equal in value (K1 = A$1). The next day, the dollar ceased to be legal tender in Papua New Guinea.

Until 25 July 1976, the kina was at parity with the Australian dollar, after which it was revalued to A$1.05, then further revalued to A$1.1812 on 28 November, then devalued to A$1.155 on 13 December.

The kina has been a historically stable currency; the economy has never experienced exorbitant rates of monetary inflation.

During its early years, the kina experienced an appreciation relative to the Australian dollar, reaching a value of approximately A$1.30 in 1980. The kina reached a peak relative to the Australian dollar in 1986 (K1 = A$1.54). The kina remained stable until 1995, when the country started experiencing double-digit annual rates of inflation, causing its value to drop gradually. The kina fell below the Australian dollar in 1996. Elevated rates of inflation persisted, and by 2002, the value of the kina fell below A$0.50. For most of the time since then, with the exception of between September 2008 and March 2009, the kina traded below A$0.50.

The average exchange rate of one kina in September 2022 was: K1 = US$0.2840, which means that US$1 = K3.52.

== Coins ==
In 1975, coins were introduced for 1, 2, 5, 10 and 20 toea and 1 kina. The 1 and 2 toea were minted in bronze, with the others in cupronickel. The 1 kina is round and holed in the centre, this denomination was reduced in size starting from 2006, and the larger coin was demonetised from 31 December 2008. 2008 also saw the introduction of a bimetallic 2 kina coin intended to replace the 2 kina note.

The withdrawal of the 1 and 2 toea coins also occurred in 2006 and as from 19 April 2007 are also no longer legal tender. The obverse of a 1 toea coin displays a birdwing butterfly, while a 2 toea coin has a lionfish on its obverse. In 1980, 50 toea coins were introduced but only issued in commemorative form without a standard design. In 2021, a 50 toea coin was issued for general circulation, utilizing the birdwing butterfly design previously used on the now withdrawn 1 toea coin.

| Denomination | Circulates since | Composition | | Shape | Diameter | Edge | Obverse | Reverse |
| Denomination | Circulates since | Ring | Center | Shape | Diameter | Edge | Obverse | Reverse |
|---|---|---|---|---|---|---|---|---|
| 5 Toea | 1975 | Copper-nickel | | Round | 19,5 mm | Milled | Turtle | National emblem |
| 5 Toea | 2002 | Nickel plated steel | | Round | 19,5 mm | Milled | Turtle | National emblem |
| 10 Toea | 1975 | Copper-nickel | | Round | 23,7 mm | Milled | Cuscus | National emblem |
| 10 Toea | 2002 | Nickel plated steel | | Round | 23,7 mm | Milled | Cuscus | National emblem |
| 20 Toea | 1975 | Copper-nickel | | Round | 28,6 mm | Milled | Cassowary | National emblem |
| 20 Toea | 2002 | Nickel plated steel | | Round | 28,6 mm | Milled | Cassowary | National emblem |
| 50 Toea | 1980 | Copper-nickel | | Heptagonal | 30 mm | Plain | Commemorative | National emblem |
| 1 Kina | 2005 | Nickel plated steel | | Round | 30 mm | Plain | Crocodiles | National emblem |

== Banknotes ==
On 19 April 1975, notes were introduced for 2, 5 and 10 kina that replaced the Australian dollar at par, so the colour scheme was the same. They circulated along with the dollar until 1 January 1976 when the dollar ceased to be legal tender. The 20 kina was introduced in 1977, 50 kina in 1988, followed by 100 kina in 2005. All colouration of the individual denominations are the same as current and former Australian decimal currency. Beginning in 1991, Papua New Guinea's banknotes have been produced on polymer, although in 2009 the bank issued Kina & Toea Day commemorative notes on paper substrates.

A new issue of banknotes has been issued starting with the 50 kina in 1999, then the 100 kina in 2005, 2 and 20 kina in 2007 and the 5 and 10 kina in 2008. This makes all the denominations of the kina issued in polymer. Paper bank notes ceased being accepted by the Bank of PNG from 31 December 2014, and are no longer legal tender.

Banknotes of the Papua New Guinean kina (1975 issue)
| Image | Value | Obverse | Reverse | Remarks |
|---|---|---|---|---|
| | 2 kina | Bird of Paradise, spear, carved "hour glass" drum (typical for the Highlands and the yearly Goroka Show) | Artifacts | White printing on all corners of the note |
| | 5 kina | Bird of Paradise, spear, carved "hour glass" drum (typical for the Highlands and the yearly Goroka Show) | Mask | White printing on all corners of the note |
| | 10 kina | Bird of Paradise, spear, carved "hour glass" drum (typical for the Highlands and the yearly Goroka Show) | Bowl, ring, artifacts | White printing on all corners of the note |
| | 20 kina | Bird of Paradise, spear, carved "hour glass" drum (typical for the Highlands and the yearly Goroka Show) | Boar, conches | White printing on all corners of the note |

Banknotes of the Papua New Guinean kina (1981 issue)
| Image | Value | Obverse | Reverse | Remarks |
|---|---|---|---|---|
| | 2 kina | Bird of Paradise, spear, carved "hour glass" drum (typical for the Highlands and the yearly Goroka Show) | Artifacts | Full printing on the note except on the watermark area |
| | 5 kina | Bird of Paradise, spear, carved "hour glass" drum (typical for the Highlands and the yearly Goroka Show) | Mask | Full printing on the note except on the watermark area |
| | 10 kina | Bird of Paradise, spear, carved "hour glass" drum (typical for the Highlands and the yearly Goroka Show) | Bowl, ring, artifacts | (1st version): Lighter toned colors used for the full printing of the note except for the watermark area |
| | 10 kina | Bird of Paradise, spear, carved "hour glass" drum (typical for the Highlands and the yearly Goroka Show) | Bowl, ring, artifacts | (2nd version): Darker toned colors used for the full printing of the note except for the watermark area; addition of the registration device on the right side of the note |
| | 20 kina | Bird of Paradise, spear, carved "hour glass" drum (typical for the Highlands and the yearly Goroka Show) | Boar, conches | Full printing on the note except on the watermark area |
| | 50 kina | The Parliament building in Port Moresby | Prime Minister Michael Somare (1936–2021) | |

Banknotes of the Papua New Guinean kina (Current issue)
| Image | Value | Obverse | Reverse | Remarks |
|---|---|---|---|---|
| | 2 kina | The Parliament building in Port Moresby | Artifacts | Printed on polymer and the first two numbers of the serial number give the last two numbers of the year of issue |
| | 5 kina | The Parliament building in Port Moresby | Mask | Printed on polymer and the first two numbers of the serial number give the last two numbers of the year of issue |
| | 10 kina | The Parliament building in Port Moresby | Bowl, Ring and Artifacts | Printed on polymer and the first two numbers of the serial number give the last two numbers of the year of issue |
| | 20 kina | The Parliament building in Port Moresby | Boar, conches | Printed on polymer and the first two numbers of the serial number give the last two numbers of the year of issue |
| | 50 kina | The Parliament building in Port Moresby | Prime Minister Michael Somare | Printed on polymer and the first two numbers of the serial number give the last two numbers of the year of issue |
| | 100 kina | The Parliament building in Port Moresby | Tanker, airplane, truck, radio tower | Printed on polymer and the first two numbers of the serial number give the last two numbers of the year of issue |

== Exchange rate ==
Current PGK exchange rates
| From Google Finance: | AUD CAD CHF CNY EUR GBP HKD JPY USD SGD IDR |
| From Yahoo! Finance: | AUD CAD CHF CNY EUR GBP HKD JPY USD SGD IDR |
| From XE.com: | AUD CAD CHF CNY EUR GBP HKD JPY USD SGD IDR |
| From OANDA: | AUD CAD CHF CNY EUR GBP HKD JPY USD SGD IDR |

== See also ==
- Economy of Papua New Guinea

History:

- New Guinean pound
- New Guinean mark

== Sources ==
- Krause, Chester L.; Clifford Mishler (1991). Standard Catalog of World Coins: 1801–1991 (18th ed.). Krause Publications. ISBN 0873411501.
- Pick, Albert (1994). Bruce, Colin R. II; Shafer, Neil (eds.). Standard Catalog of World Paper Money: General Issues (7th ed.). Krause Publications. ISBN 0-87341-207-9.

| Preceded by: Australian dollar Reason: independence Ratio: at par | Currency of Papua New Guinea; 19 April 1975 – Concurrent with: Australian dollar until 1 January 1976 | Succeeded by: Current |
