= Arthur Somare =

Arthur Somare is a former Member of the National Parliament of Papua New Guinea (PNG). He represented the electorate of Angoram Open in East Sepik province for the National Alliance Party from 1997 until he lost in the 2012 general elections.

Somare was first elected to the 6th national Parliament in 1997, and has served in several ministerial roles. In March 2006, he resigned as Minister for National Planning and Monitoring over alleged financial improprieties. He was reappointed as head of the Ministry for Public Enterprise, Information, and Development in July 2006. In July 2010 the ministry of Finance was added to his portfolio. He lost all ministerial positions after the Name/O'Neil government came into power in August 2011.

As the Minister for Public Enterprises, Somare and his ministry had responsibility for the Independent Public Business Corporation (IPBC), which was the sole shareholder of all of the state owned enterprises such as Air Niugini, Telikom PNG, PNG Power, PNG Ports Corporation, Eda Ranu and Water PNG, and other businesses. Prominent among those other businesses was the more than US$20billion LNG-PNG project which was managed and majority owned by Exxon-Mobil. Somare was in charge of that project on behalf of the PNG government. He arranged the financing of equity participation by the PNG government through a loan from the International Public Investment Company (IPIC) in Abu Dhabi. This was secured by the shareholding of the PNG government in the Oil Search company. IPIC managed to claim those shares when PNG did not manage to redeem the loan in time. Somare maintains that the project could not have been realized without this financial construction. However, this way of acquiring equity for the PNG state through a secured leverage construction has become controversial and it is one of the main policy issues in PNG. Mekere Morauta is in this field the main opponent of Somare and the acquisition of equity through leverage. Somare is since he left parliament a consultant in natural resources policy issues.

Somare is a son of Papua New Guinea's first Prime Minister Sir Michael Somare, who played a crucial role in attaining independence, and Veronica Somare. Although both belong to the National Alliance Party, party allegiance is of little importance in PNG as parties tend not to be associated with policy positions. Essential in PNG politics is coalition building among various regional centers. The Somare family is associated with the East Sepik region and Arthur Somare started his political career as the District member for Angoram in the East Sepik Province.

== Corruption ==
The Leadership Code gives the Ombudsman in Papua New Guinea the power to investigate allegations of corruption. If a leader is found prima facie in breach of the leadership code, the Ombudsman must refer the case to the Public Prosecutor. The latter can direct that a leadership Tribunal is formed consisting of several judges. PNG's Ombudsman Commission initially referred Somare to the Public Prosecutor in 2006 over misconduct in office, He challenged that decision in court and his political career seemed not to be hindered by the affair, This changed when he lost office and the Namah/O'Neill government came to power in 2011/2012. In July 2011, the prosecutor formally lodged 105 allegations of misconduct in office against Somare to the Leadership Tribunal. Somare is alleged to have misapplied public funds and failed to produce acquittals in 2002, and also failed to submit his annual statements to the Ombudsman Commission in the late 1990s, as required by law. He was in 2011 immediately suspended as Angoram MP. Somare embarked on a string of court cases challenging the referral, but the courts did not find favorable for him. In July 2012, he appeared before the tribunal. He was then cleared of eight allegations of misappropriation of money from the District Improvement Grant and found guilty on a minor issue. Somare lost the 2012 parliamentary elections and this made the case before a Leadership Tribunal irrelevant. Leaders can avoid tribunals by resigning of losing leadership positions.

Somare was accused by the former Minister for Public Enterprises, Mekere Morauta of squandering state funds through poor business decisions, malpractice and misappropriation of funds for personal gain, including lavish homes in Australia and visits to Singapore in 2011.

Allegations lodged by Morauta against Somare include: his mishandling of a loan to buy equity in Liquid Niugini LNG, an LNG project, leading to a loss of K900 million; the loss of K31 million in bankrupted Lehman Brothers; K200 million owed by Telikom to banks as a result of loans being taken out without the authority of the Treasury; paralysing PNG Power due to a lack of capital; and facilitating a transaction in which K96 million disappeared from the Motor Vehicle Insurance Limited (MVIL), following the sale of MVIL shares in Bank South Pacific. The K96 million that had disappeared was subsequently found to be paid into an Australian bank account, owned by a “dubious investment company” Woodlawn Capital Ltd, Only a part of the money is recovered and the issue is the subject of a police investigation.
