= Yonki Dam =

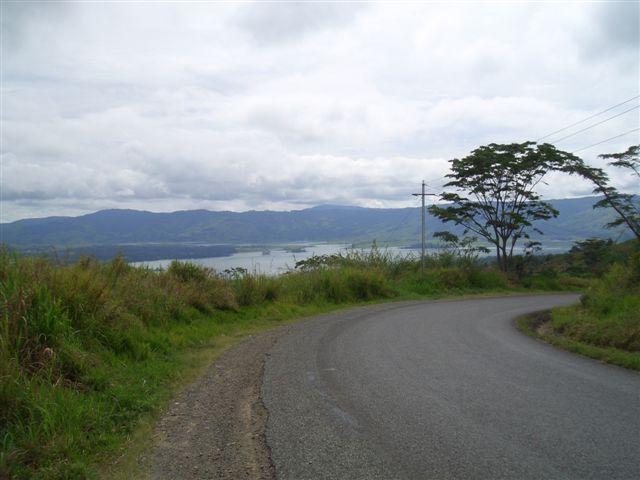
- Yonki Dam viewed from Highlands Highway

- Location within Papua New Guinea
- Location: Papua New Guinea
- Coordinates: 6°15′05″S 145°58′49″E
- Construction began: 1986
- Opening date: 1991
- Construction cost: US$140 million
- Owner: PNG Power

Dam and spillways
- Type of dam: Embankment
- Height: 60 m (200 ft)
- Dam volume: 1,900,000 m^{3} (67,000,000 ft^{3})

Reservoir
- Creates: Yonki Reservoir
- Total capacity: 335,000,000 m^{3} (1.18×10^{10} ft^{3})

Power Station
- Operator: PNG Power
- Commission date: 1991
- Turbines: 5 (Ramu 1) plus 2 under construction (Yonki Toe of Dam)
- Installed capacity: 77 MW (103,000 hp) (Ramu 1) plus 18 MW (24,000 hp) under construction

Yonki Dam is an earth-fill embankment dam over the Ramu River that supports the Ramu 1 hydroelectric power plant and the (under construction) Yonki Toe of Dam power plant.

Yonki Dam is located in the Eastern Highlands Province of Papua New Guinea.

The Highlands Highway passes over the Yonki Dam embankment. The adjacent Yonki villages support the operation of the dam and power station.

== Ramu 1 ==
Ramu 1 Power Station is a 77-megawatt (103,000 hp) hydroelectric power station located on the Ramu in Eastern Highlands Province, Papua New Guinea.

The power station consists of five units. Units 1, 2, and 3 are rated at 15 megawatts (20,000 hp), and units 4 and 5 are rated at 17 megawatts (23,000 hp). The power station is owned and operated by PNG Power.
