= Ramu =

Major river in Papua New Guinea

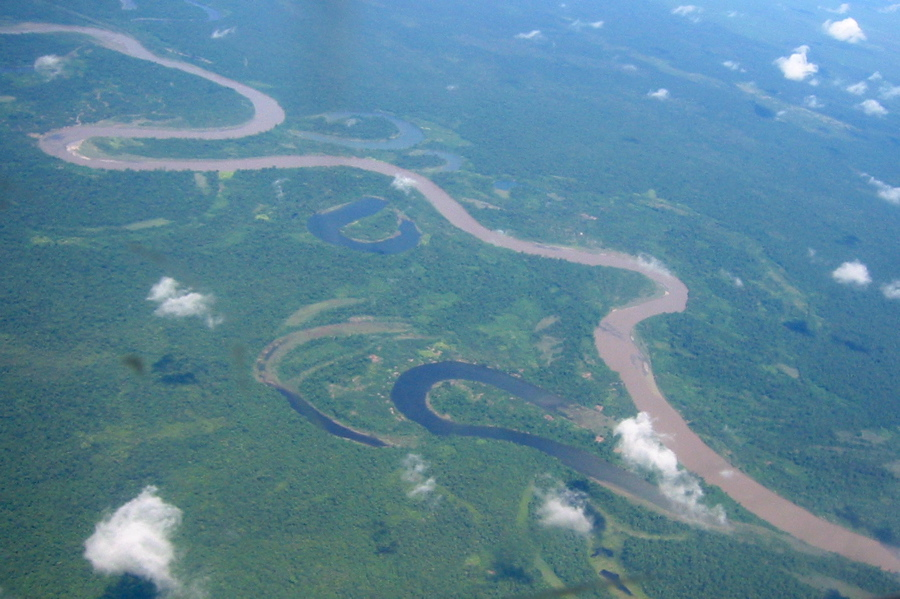
- Part of the Ramu from the air

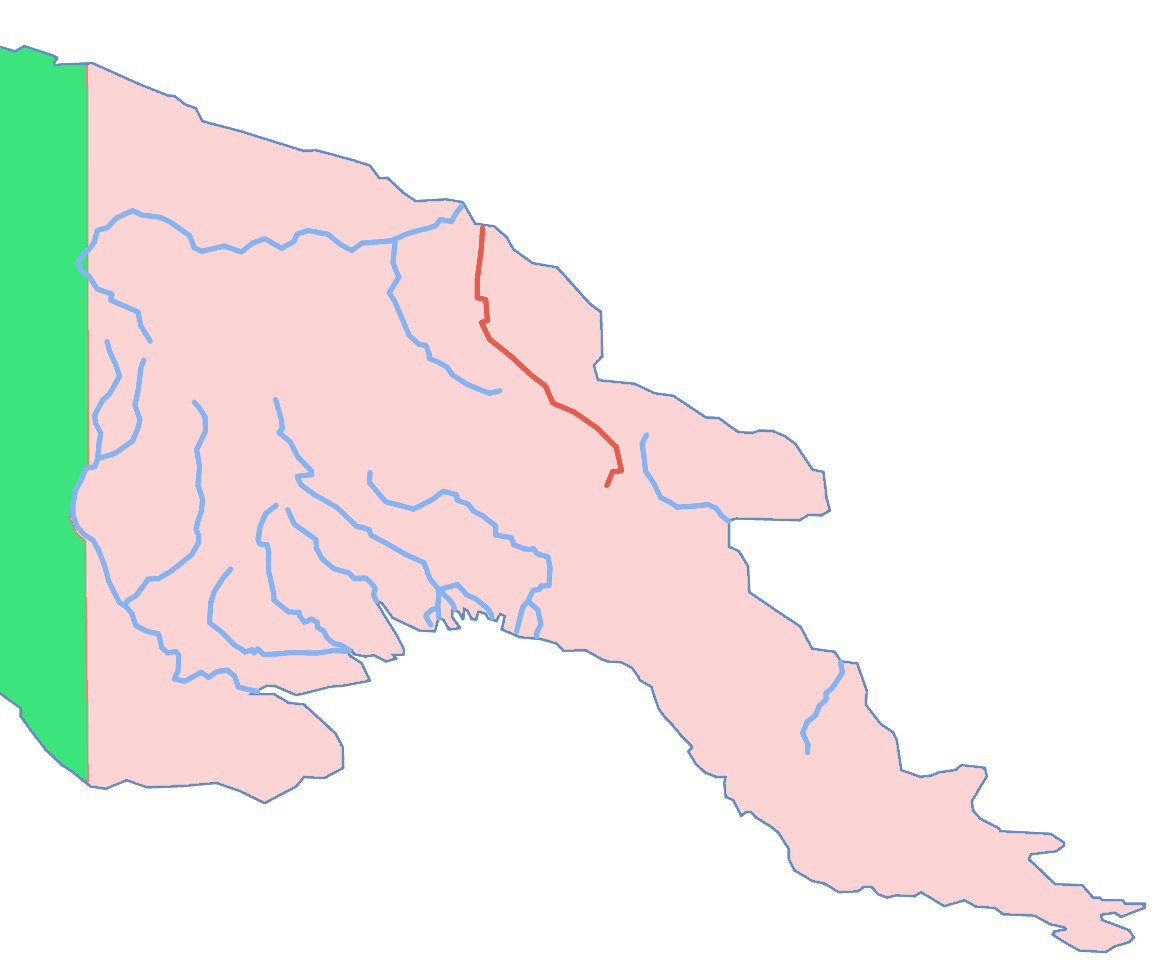
- Location of the Ramu River

Location
- Country: Papua New Guinea
- Region: Madang Province

Physical characteristics
- Source
  - location: Kratke Range, Papua New Guinea
- Mouth
  - location: Bismarck Sea, Papua New Guinea
  - coordinates: 4°1′S 144°40′E
- Length: 640 km (400 mi)
- Basin size: 18,720 km^{2} (7,230 sq mi)
- Discharge
  - average: 1,500 m^{3}/s (53,000 cu ft/s)
  - maximum: 5,000 m^{3}/s (180,000 cu ft/s)

The Ramu River is a major river in northern Papua New Guinea. The headwaters of the river are formed in the Kratke Range from where it then travels about 640 km (398 mi) northwest to the Bismarck Sea.

Along the Ramu's course, it receives numerous tributaries from the Bismarck Range to the south and the Finisterre and Adelbert.

== History ==
For many millennia, people have lived along the river, and the river has formed the basis for food, transport, and culture.

=== German exploration ===
The area encompassed by the Ramu was part of Kaiser-Wilhelmsland when Germany established German New Guinea in 1884. The Germans were quick to explore their territory, and the mouth of the Ramu was discovered in 1886 by Vice-Admiral Freiherr von Schleinitz after returning to Finschhafen from an expedition to the nearby Sepik. Schleinitz called the Ramu, Ottilien after his ship the Ottilie.

The course of the river was first discovered 10 years later in 1896 after Dr Carl Lauterbach, a botanist, led an expedition organised by the German New Guinea Company (Neu Guinea Kompagnie) to find the headwaters of the Markham River. After crossing the Ortzen Mountains from Astrolabe Bay south of Madang, Lauterbach's party, instead of finding the Markham, found an unknown river flowing northwest. The party canoed along a section before their supplies dwindled; they returned to the coast retracing their route.

Another German explorer, Ernst Tappenbeck, who had accompanied Lauterbach previously, led the first expedition to ascend the Ramu in 1898. Tappenbeck was charged with discovering whether the Ottilien found in 1886 was the same river Lauterbech had found. He was accompanied by former Prussian Army officers, a Kompagnie official and an Australian gold prospector Robert Phillip, and travelled in the Neu Guinea Kompagnie steamer Herzog Johann Albrecht.

After five days of journey up the Ramu, Tappenbeck left his companions at a well-stocked camp when river water levels fell. He returned four and half months later in another steamer, Herzogin Elisabeth, and the party managed to navigate 190 mi (310 km) upstream and go farther still by canoe. By the end of 1898, the expedition had established a station on the river, mapped it and tributaries, and made a large botanical collection.

Further explorations for gold and botanical specimens were conducted by the Germans. In 1902, Hans Klink and J. Schlenzig established a new Ramu station that was later connected by a bridle track to the coast. Dr R. Schlecter led another expedition in 1902 in search of gutta-percha trees. Then in 1907, Austrian explorer Wilhelm Dammköhler led an expedition up the Markham Valley and linked the headwaters of the Markham River with the Ramu for the first time.

=== Australian administration and Second World War ===
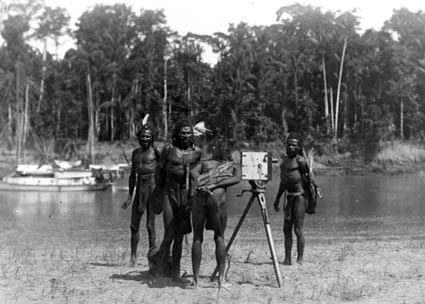
Ramu villagers investigating a camera during an Australian expedition in the 1930s

After the First World War, German New Guinea passed over to Australian control and became the Territory of New Guinea. The Ramu reverted to its local name during this time.

In 1936, Briton, Lord Moyne, ventured up the Ramu during an expedition to Indonesia and New Guinea. Moyne discovered a race of pygmy-like people inhabiting the middle Ramu region 170 miles (270 km) from the mouth of the river in the Aiome foothills.

During the Second World War in 1942, the Japanese annexed the entire Territory of New Guinea from the Australians. Intense fighting occurred between the Imperial Japanese Army and the Australian and US Armies to recapture New Guinea. During the Finisterre Range campaign in 1943 and 1944, the Ramu Valley became the scene of a major battle.

== Hydroelectric plant ==
The Ramu flows into Yonki Dam, where it feeds the Ramu 1 power station.

A hydroelectric plant was under construction on the toe of the Yonki Dam, however, construction is currently (May 2011) suspended.

== Image gallery ==
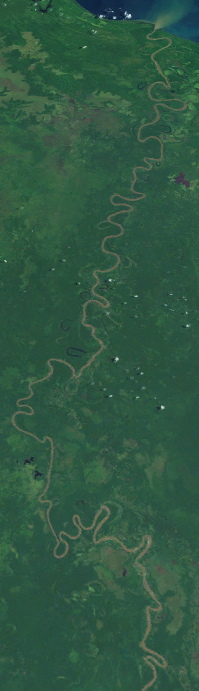
The last 300 or so kilometres of the Ramu as it winds towards the Bismarck

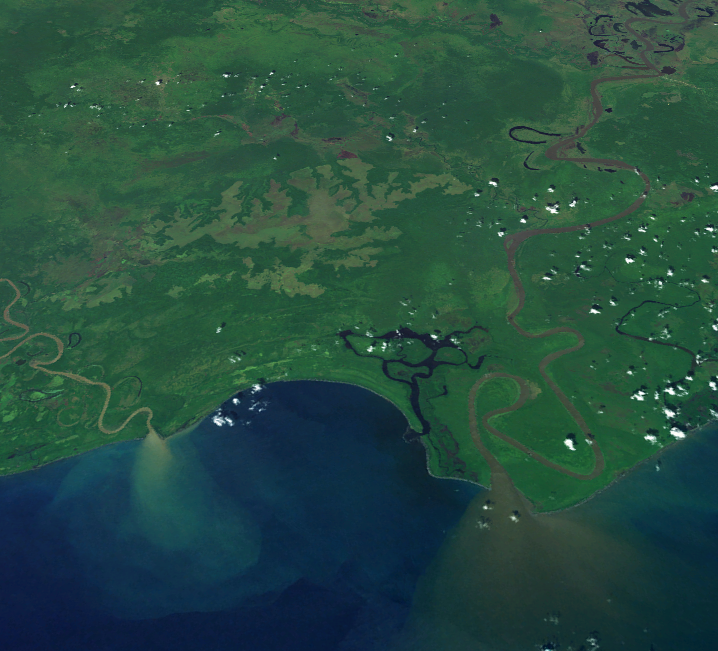
Ramu and Sepik sediment plumes
