= Sirinumu Dam =

Dam near Port Moresby, Papua New Guinea

- Location within Papua New Guinea
- Country: Papua New Guinea
- Location: Central Province
- Coordinates: 9°28′45″S 147°26′47″E
- Purpose: Multi-purpose
- Status: Operational
- Construction began: 1958
- Opening date: 7 September 1963
- Operator: PNG Power

Reservoir
- Creates: Lake Sirinumu

Power Station
- Operator: PNG Power
- Turbines: Sirinumu Toe-of-Dam, Rouna 1, Rouna 2, Rouna 3, and Rouna 4
- Installed capacity: 89 MW (119,000 hp)

The Sirinumu Dam is an important piece of infrastructure within Papua New Guinea, providing both water and electricity to the electrical grid of the capital Port Moresby. The dam itself is located outside of Port Moresby, in Central Province. Its hydroelectric power generation produces most of the power for the city. At times when the dam has been shut down, either due to disputes with local landowners or due to low water levels, there have been water and electricity shortages in the city.

The dam was built by the Australian authorities, which governed the Territory of Papua and New Guinea at the time, from 1958 to 1963. It was built on what remains to this day the customary land of the Koiari people, following agreements made with the landowners. Since the 1970s, local landowners have claimed that the agreements have not been honoured by either the Australian government or later Papua New Guinean governments, and that they themselves lack consistent access to clean drinking water and electricity.

== Location and design ==
The dam is located in Central Province, in a natural basin surrounded by mountains south of Sogeri. The dammed area receives inputs from the Laloki River and a number of its tributaries, which has become Lake Sirinumu. Some of the newly formed islands within the lake remain inhabited. It takes about an hour by bus to get to Port Moresby from the main port in the lake. Part of the soil on which the dam is built is laterite. The main dam is steel-faced rockfill, an unusual design with very few examples elsewhere. Seven earthfill saddle dams were constructed to shore up other parts of the reservoir.

== History ==
The land flooded by the dam was inhabited by a number of clans, per later claims there were six: Wanowari, Orari, Monitori, Magibiri, Tuiya, and Bemuri. Another claim is that the Wakai people previously lived in four villages, two larger ones called Yoadabu and Gebodabu, and the smaller Araidabu and Sabetana. Some submerged land was used as rubber plantations.

The Australian authorities who governed Papua New Guinea at the time negotiated with these landowners to construct the dam. Construction began in 1958. The first complete agreement was made in 1961. The dam was officially opened by then-Australian prime minister Robert Menzies on 7 September 1963. Shortly after the dam's completion, tilapia, snakeskin gourami, and silver perch were introduced to the newly formed lake. The giant gourami was introduced in 1966, to little success.

On 31 January 1992, the government approved annual rental payments of K130,000 until 1995. In 1996, the government set up the Sirinumu Development Company through PNG Power to handle payments to the landowners, however, the landowners did not find this to be a success. The Sirinumu Development Company and the Koiari Development Authority are the bodies through which the government provides rental payments.

During the 1997 drought in Papua New Guinea, the dam's power stations were shut down to ensure the dam could continue to supply drinking water. A strong El Niño–Southern Oscillation event from 2014 to 2015 reduced the dam to 35% of capacity, requiring water rationing in Port Moresby.

== Use ==
Port Moresby receives less rainfall than most other mainland areas of Papua New Guinea, and due to the city's large and growing population, water is a significant economic and political issue. The Sirinumu Dam is the only dam supplying water to the city, although it is outside of the city limits. Even with this dam, water access in Port Moresby is low, and the dam itself regularly has low water levels.

The dam also provides electricity. In addition to the Sirinumu Hydropower Plant, power is generated by a hydroelectric plant in the Rouna Gorge, using water piped down from the lake. The small Sirinumu plant (also called the Sirinumu Toe-of-Dam) produces 1MW, Rouna 1 and 3 produce 12MW each, Rouna 2 produces 24MW, and Rouna 4 produces 40MW. This electricity is fed into the Port Moresby electrical grid, and produces over half of that grid's power. As of 2017, this required 10 to 19 cubic metres (350 to 670 cu ft) of water flow per second.

The lake now serves recreational purposes, being used for kayaking and canoeing. It has tilapia farms which can be visited by tourists. It also serves as a starting point for hikes to surrounding waterfalls.

== Koiari landowners ==
The dam is located on customary land. The landowners are members of the Koiari people, and the issue of payments and compensation is common, not just for the dam's landowners, but also for the landowners of the river sources, and where pipes traverse. In 2013, the government established a ministerial committee to create a long-term agreement, but this was unsuccessful. Demands for compensation stretch back to at least the 1970s. The local community states that promises of infrastructure, such as a ring road around the lake, have never been fulfilled. They also state they lack consistent potable water and electricity. Grievances exist both for the historical treatment by the Australian government, and subsequent treatment by the independent governments of Papua New Guinea.

Demands for compensation for the dam's usage come alongside threats to close the dam. At some points this has caused the dam to close, including in 2015, 2017, and 2019. If the dam is shut down, power generation will cease six hours later. The Port Moresby Chamber of Commerce and Industry has asserted that such shutdowns violate the Essential Services Act.

Many landowners are subsistence farmers, who feel the use of resources from their land to support the capital should be better compensated. The creation of the dam forced a shift from hunting and gathering to a lifestyle based on fishing. Today, homegrown food, fishing, and tourism are the basis of local incomes. Some landowners have formed an independent registered company to try and establish a more formal compensation system, separate from the Sirinumu Development Company.
