= Veronica Somare =

Papua New Guinean first lady

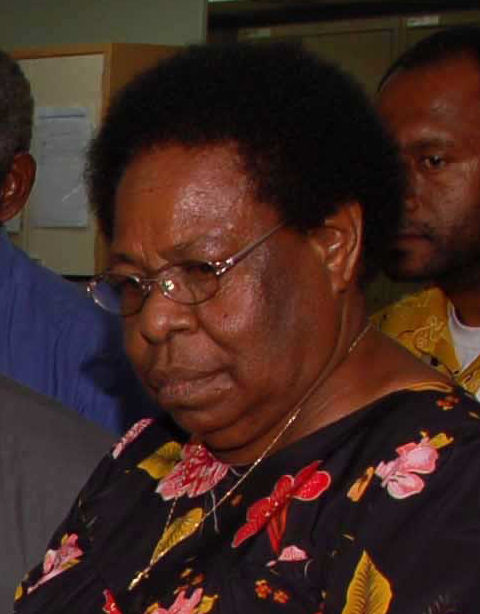
- Somare in 2008

Spouse of the Prime Minister of Papua New Guinea
- In office 17 January 2011 – 4 April 2011
- In office 5 August 2002 – 13 December 2010
- In office 2 August 1982 – 21 November 1985
- In office 16 September 1975 – 11 March 1980

Personal details
- Born: Veronica Kaiap; 1946 (age 79–80)
- Spouse: Michael Somare (m. 1965; died 2021)
- Children: Betha, Sana, Arthur, Michael, and Dulciana

Veronica Somare (née Kaiap; born 1946), known as Lady Somare, is the wife of Sir Michael Somare, the country's first prime minister of Papua New Guinea who is known as the "father of the nation." Veronica Somare has been honoured for her own role in the establishment of Papua New Guinea and her position as the country's inaugural spouse of the prime minister.

== Biography ==
Somare was born Veronica Kaiap in 1946, as a member of the Mindamot lineage. Somare's father was Mathew Kaiap and she is one of eleven siblings.

in 1965, at age 19, she married Michael Somare. The couple had met that year in Wewak, and Michael was immediately taken with Veronica, courting her quickly in "the village fashion." They had five children together: Betha, Sana, Arthur, Michael, and Dulciana. The pair remained married until Michael's death in 2021.

Veronica Somare took on a significant public role in Papua New Guinea in 1975, when her husband became the country's first prime minister. After finishing his term in 1980, he went on to serve two subsequent terms from 1982 to 1985 and from 2002 to 2011. Veronica cared for their children while supporting her husband's ambitious political career. In 2005, she told an interviewer, "I had to explain to the children that Papa ino blong yupela tasol. Em papa blong kantri tu (Your father is not yours alone. He is also the Father of the country)."

Later, Michael Somare emphasized Veronica's role in his political success: "She was a young woman who changed my life so that I could have the credibility at home and professionally." After the former prime minister's death, Prime Minister James Marape described Veronica as the "steadying hands that steadied our late Grand Chief."

In 2008, she was awarded the Order of Logohu for her contributions to Papua New Guinea.

While Somare's primary focus has been supporting her family throughout her husband's prominent career, she is also deeply interested in the cultivation of orchids. In 1981, an orchid commonly known as the Sepik Blue was formally named dendrobium Veronica Somare. She has also been involved in various philanthropic and development efforts, including the country's microfinance bank for women.
