= Bank of Papua New Guinea =

Monetary authority of Papua New Guinea

- Central bank of: Papua New Guinea
- Headquarters: Port Moresby, Papua New Guinea
- Ownership: 100% state ownership
- Governor: Elizabeth Genia
- Currency: Papua New Guinean kina PGK (ISO 4217)
- Reserves: 1 680 million USD
- Website: bankpng.gov.pg

The Bank of Papua New Guinea (Tok Pisin: Beng bilong Papua Niugini) is the central bank of Papua New Guinea, which has a core mandate to ensure price stability and maintain macroeconomic growth. To achieve this, it discharges four main functions; 1. responsible for the formulation and implementation of monetary policy, 2. ensure financial system development and stability, 3. ensure the payment system remain efficient, and 4. provide a banking role to the Government. It also manages the country's foreign reserves, issue the country's currency, manages the gold and foreign exchange of Papua New Guinea.

The Bank of Papua New Guinea is the only institution that is permitted to issue the Papua New Guinean kina, which has been the case since early 1975.

Elizabeth Genia is the current Governor of the Bank.

== Background ==
Banking came to Papua in 1910 with the establishment of a branch of the Bank of New South Wales in Port Moresby. In 1916, the Australian government-owned Commonwealth Bank, established a branch in Rabaul and agencies in other towns, largely to support the banking needs of the Australian Army and its troops who had taken control of the former German colony of New Guinea. In time, this operation became a full-fledged commercial banking operation.

The Commonwealth Bank established many branches across Papua New Guinea including Port Moresby, Boroko, Rabaul, Lae, Wau, Bulolo, Goroka, Kavieng, Madang, Mount Hagen, Kundiawa, Popondetta and Wewak. On Bougainville there was Kieta, Panguna, Arawa and early on a part-time sub branch at Loloho. The bank maintained those facilities to support trade, local business, government and small savers.

The BNSW suspended its operations in Papua in 1941 after the Japanese Army captured many of the towns in which it had branches and agencies, and bombed Port Moresby. The BNSW resumed banking operations in 1946. The National Bank of Australasia established a branch in Port Moresby in 1957.

In preparation for independence, the Bank of Papua New Guinea was established as the country's central bank in 1973. The incoming Papua New Guinean (PNG) government made known its desire that all banks in PNG be locally incorporated, rather than be branches of a foreign parent. The National Australia Bank (NAB) incorporated its operations in PNG in 1974, which it called Bank South Pacific (BSP). Also in 1974, the Commonwealth Bank withdrew from PNG, transferring its operations to the new government of PNG, which called the bank the "Papua New Guinea Banking Corporation" (PNGBC). Papua New Guinea was granted independence in 1975. The Australia and New Zealand Banking Group established ANZ (PNG) in 1976. In 1990, the ANZ acquired Lloyds' operations in Papua New Guinea.

Then the government encouraged the bank to sell equity to local citizens. BSP conducted public offerings in 1980 and 1981, resulting in local citizens holding 13% of the bank's shares. Later, the government decided to acquire control of BSP. In 1993, National Investment Holdings Limited (NIHL) first acquired NAB's 87% shareholding, and then the 13% of the shares in the hands of the public, giving it 100% ownership of BSP. NIHL later changed its name to BSP.

In 1983, Banque Indosuez established Indosuez Nuigini in PNG, with offices in Port Moresby and Lae. Indosuez Nuigini was 49% owned by Banque Indosuez, 41.5% by Bank of Papua New Guinea, and the remainder by the public. Bank of Hawaii acquired Indosuez Nuigini in 1997 for $5.6 million and renamed it Bank of Hawaii (PNG) Ltd.

In 1994, Maybank set up a subsidiary in PNG, Maybank (PNG) Limited, and opening two branch offices, one in Port Moresby and the other in Lae.

In 1995, the government sold a 25% stake of BSP to Credit Corporation (PNG) and a 22% to Motor Vehicles Insurance (PNG) Trust (now incorporated as Motor Vehicles Insurance Limited). In 2002, PNGBC ran into problems, and BSP acquired the government's 49% stake in PNGBC in return for the government taking a 25% stake in BSP. Between 2002 and 2008 the operations of BSP and PNGBC were merged.

In September 2015, Maybank exited PNG with the sale of Maybank (PNG) Limited and Mayban Property (PNG) Limited to Kina Ventures Ltd.

In 2018, ANZ Bank sold its, retail, commercial and SME banking services to Kina Bank, retaining only its large corporate banking services in the country; In 2021 Kina Securities Ltd (the owner of Kina Bank) also sought to acquire the banking operations of Westpac Bank across the Pacific, however, the acquisition of Westpac PNG was rejected by PNG's Independent Consumer and Competition Commission, resulting in Westpac terminating its sale agreement with Kina for Westpac PNG and Westpac Fiji.

BPNG is engaged in developing policies to promote financial inclusion and is a member of the Alliance for Financial Inclusion, which had been formed in 2008. In 2013, BPNG made a Maya Declaration Commitment to create an enabling environment for building an inclusive financial sector in Papua New Guinea.

== Governors ==
- Sir Henry ToRobert (1973–1993)
- Sir Mekere Morauta (1993–1994)
- Koiari Tarata (1994–1998)
- John Vulupindi (1998)
- Morea Vele (1998–1999)
- Sir Wilson Kamit (1999–2009)
- Loi Bakani (2009-2021)
- Benny Popoitai (Acting governor Sept. 2022-Jan 2023)
- Elizabeth Genia (Acting governor from 2023 to 2024, permanent governor from 2024)

== Legal framework ==
=== Central Banking Act 1973 ===
The Bank of Papua New Guinea was established by the Central Banking Act 1973, which defines its powers and functions as:

"The Central Bank shall, within the limits of its powers, ensure that its monetary and banking policy is directed to the greatest advantage to the people of Papua New Guinea, and direct its efforts to promoting monetary stability and a sound and efficient financial structure."

Before Papua New Guinea's independence, the central bank was a branch of the Reserve Bank of Australia, then the colonial power.

=== Central Banking Act 2000 ===
The Central Banking Act 2000 amended the laws establishing the Bank of Papua New Guinea as the central bank, and defined its objectives and functions to include:

1. confer upon the Bank of Papua New Guinea certain functions and powers including formulation and implementation of monetary policies and regulation of the financial system,
2. make provision for and regulate the Papua New Guinean currency, and
3. make provisions in respect of foreign exchange and international reserves.

The first review of the Bank of Papua New Guinea since 2000 was commissioned by the Treasurer, Ian Ling-Stuckey, in June 2021, with the aim of bringing the Bank's systems and structure in line with the needs of current conditions, including better oversight of financial services increasingly conducted online;

=== Anti-Money Laundering and Counter Terrorist Financing Act 2015 ===
Under the Anti-Money Laundering and Counter Terrorist Financing Act 2015 a Financial Analysis and Supervision Unit was established to operate administratively within the Bank of Papua New Guinea, but operationally independent of the Bank. FASU’s role is to protect PNG from money laundering and terrorist financing. Its objective is to ensure that individuals or groups for personal or professional gain do not abuse PNG’s financial system. FASU is responsible for maintaining the integrity of PNG’s financial system. The FASU Director, (former Bank of PNG Deputy Governor, Benny Popoitai) highlighted that the task of tackling money laundering and counter terrorist financing schemes is enormous involving not only the Bank, but also the other law enforcement agencies that comprise the Financial Action Task Force (FATF)

== Controversies ==
In November 2010, a former deputy governor of the Bank of Papua New Guinea, was arrested on allegations that, when deputy governor, he misappropriated K16,000 in travel allowance from the bank.

The officer left the bank suddenly in 2003, after a 20-year career. At the time, the Bank's Governor Sir Wilson Kamit took the unusual step of placing an advertisement in a newspaper, explaining that the officer had been fired as a result of misappropriation of money belonging to the bank.

== See also ==
- Papua New Guinean kina
- Economy of Papua New Guinea
- List of central banks
- List of financial supervisory authorities by country
