= Michael Somare =

Papua New Guinean politician (1936–2021)

The Right Honourable Grand Chief Sir Michael Somare GCL GCMG CH CF SSI KStJ KSG
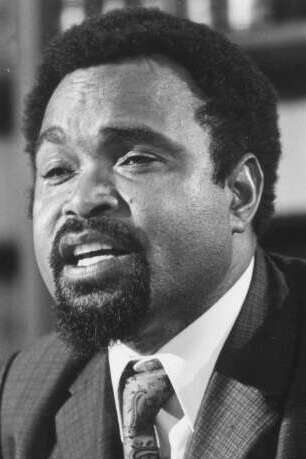
- Somare in 1973

1st Prime Minister of Papua New Guinea
- In office 17 January 2011 – 4 April 2011
- Monarch: Elizabeth II
- Governor General: Michael Ogio
- Preceded by: Sam Abal (acting)
- Succeeded by: Sam Abal (acting)
- In office 5 August 2002 – 13 December 2010
- Monarch: Elizabeth II
- Governors General: Silas Atopare; Bill Skate (acting); Jeffrey Nape (acting); Paulias Matane
- Preceded by: Mekere Morauta
- Succeeded by: Sam Abal (acting)
- In office 2 August 1982 – 21 November 1985
- Monarch: Elizabeth II
- Governors General: Tore Lokoloko; Kingsford Dibela
- Preceded by: Julius Chan
- Succeeded by: Paias Wingti
- In office 16 September 1975 – 11 March 1980
- Monarch: Elizabeth II
- Governors General: John Guise; Tore Lokoloko
- Preceded by: Himself (as Chief Minister)
- Succeeded by: Julius Chan

Personal details
- Born: Michael Thomas Somare; 9 April 1936 Rabaul, Territory of New Guinea
- Died: 26 February 2021 (aged 84) Port Moresby, National Capital District, Papua New Guinea
- Citizenship: Australian (1936–1975); Papua New Guinean (from 1975)
- Party: National Alliance (1997–2015); Independent (1988–1994; 1995–1997); Pangu (1967–1988; 1994–1995)
- Spouse: Veronica Kaiap (m. 1965)
- Children: 5, including Arthur

Sir Michael Thomas Somare GCL GCMG CH CF SSI KStJ KSG PC (9 April 1936 – 25 February 2021) was a Papua New Guinean politician. Widely called the "father of the nation" (Tok Pisin: Papa blo kantri), he was the first Prime Minister after independence. At the time of his death, Somare was also the longest-serving prime minister, having been in office for 17 years over three separate terms: from 1975 to 1980; from 1982 to 1985; and from 2002 to 2011. His political career spanned from 1968 until his retirement in 2017. Besides serving as PM, he was minister of foreign affairs, leader of the opposition and governor of East Sepik Province.

He served in a variety of positions. His base was not primarily in political parties but in East Sepik Province, the area that elected him. During his political career he was a member of the House of Assembly and after independence in 1975 the National parliament for the East Sepik Provincial – later open – seat. He was the first chief minister at the end of colonial rule. Thereafter he became the first Prime Minister after independence from 1975 to 1980. He returned to the office of Prime Minister from 1982 to 1985, and his longest stint in the position was from 2002 to 2011. He also served as Cabinet Minister: he was minister of foreign affairs from 1988 to 1992; from 1999 to 2001 he was subsequently minister of foreign affairs, minister of mining and Bougainville, minister of foreign affairs and Bougainville affairs. He was leader of the opposition from 1968 to 1972, from 1980 to 1982, and thereafter in that position from 1985 to 1988, from 1992 to 1993, and finally from 2001 to 2002. When the new position of political governor as head of the provincial administration and representative MP was created in 1995, Somare took up the job. He was governor of East Sepik from 1995 until 1999. After the last election that he contended, he again became Governor of East Sepik (2012–2016). He was a founding member of the Pangu Party which led PNG into independence in 1975. He resigned from the Pangu Party and became an independent in 1988. He rejoined the Pangu Party in 1994 but was sacked as a leader in the following year. He was then asked to join and lead the National Alliance Party. In 2017 he left politics and also the National Alliance Party.

While Somare was in March 2011 hospitalised in Singapore, a majority of parliamentarians declared the post of Prime Minister vacant. Peter O'Neill was the new prime minister. This was contested. On 12 December 2011, the Supreme Court of Papua New Guinea ordered that Somare be reinstated as Prime Minister, ruling that O'Neill had not been lawfully appointed. This event triggered the 2011–12 Papua New Guinean constitutional crisis. Following a decisive victory for O'Neill in the 2012 general election, Somare expressed support for him, thereby ending the crisis and forming a coalition government. However, this truce did not last. When Somare announced his departure from politics, he made a blistering attack on O'Neill.

== Early life ==
Somare was the son of Ludwig Somare Sana and Kambe Somare. Ludwig Somare was a policeman, rising to the rank of sergeant. Having taught himself to read and write, he was subsequently active in encouraging formation of small businesses and co-operatives, founding the Angoram Co-operative Society which he chaired from 1961 until 1967. In all, Ludwig Somare Sana had four wives and six children, of whom Somare was the eldest.

Born in Rabaul in a village called Rapikid, where his father was then stationed, Somare grew up in his family village of Karau in the Murik Lakes district of East Sepik Province. Somare's earliest education was in a Japanese-run primary school at Karau during World War II where he learned to read, write and count in Japanese. Meanwhile, Somare's father was in hiding and fear of his life from the Japanese in Rabaul, but he remembers the Japanese with affection. Somare's earliest overseas trips, first as a parliamentarian and then as Prime Minister, were to Japan.

From 1946 Somare attended Boram Primary School, then Dregerhafen Education Centre and Sogeri High School, graduating with a Leaving Certificate issued on behalf of the Australian state of Victoria in 1957. This was a teaching qualification at the time, and he then taught at several primary and secondary schools, returning to Sogeri High School for further training from 1962 to 1963.

=== Sepik identity ===
Somare liked to present himself in a lap-lap (a kind of sarong) instead of in trousers. Lap laps are not traditional in the sense of pre-colonial and is therefore a declaration of neo traditionalism. That is also evident in his autobiography that he published at independence. He was stressing his Sepik identity, despite being born in Rabaul on the islands and far from the Sepik, but he portrayed his time as a child in Sepik villages as decisive in forming his personality. His father brought him there to the village of Karau in the Murik Lakes region when Somare's mother separated from him. Somare paid elaborate attention to his initiation and the role of matrilineal descent is also evident there. ”Our mother’s brothers" receive for example the initiates after their ordeal. Yet the people of the Sepik do not enforce descent rules rigorously. Somare claimed also the honorific title of Sana in his father's line. This title asserts descent from the founder of the clan and is a designation as peacemaker. The title of Sana bestowed for example on the bearer the duty of organising a meal for the enemies before a fight. Sepik societies are no longer expected to make war: a historical element is thus given meaning in a new context. In order to obtain the title he was approved for admission to the elders of the clan before he had reached the required minimum age.

This may be less controversial than Somare portrayed. Leadership in the Sepik is not based on descent but on a consensus among the elders and reputation is decisive. Anthropological literature argues that Western Polynesian societies are not particularly centralised and although there is a big man attitude to leadership there is a continuous jockeying for position among those who want to be big man. Political ideology in PNG refers to this as the Melanesian way. This background can be seen as a formative influence on Somare's political practice. PNG has not been dominated by one particular leader whose power base was in a centralised institution like a party or the army. Political life in Papua New Guinea is fragmented and decentralised: party formation is weak. Above all, Papua New Guinea has maintained a Westminster style democracy and leaders moved aside when they lost parliamentary majorities. At independence Somare insisted on a ministerial rather than a presidential system. In his valedictory parliamentary speech, he urged young leaders to learn what the Westminster system of government is meant to achieve.

== Early political career ==
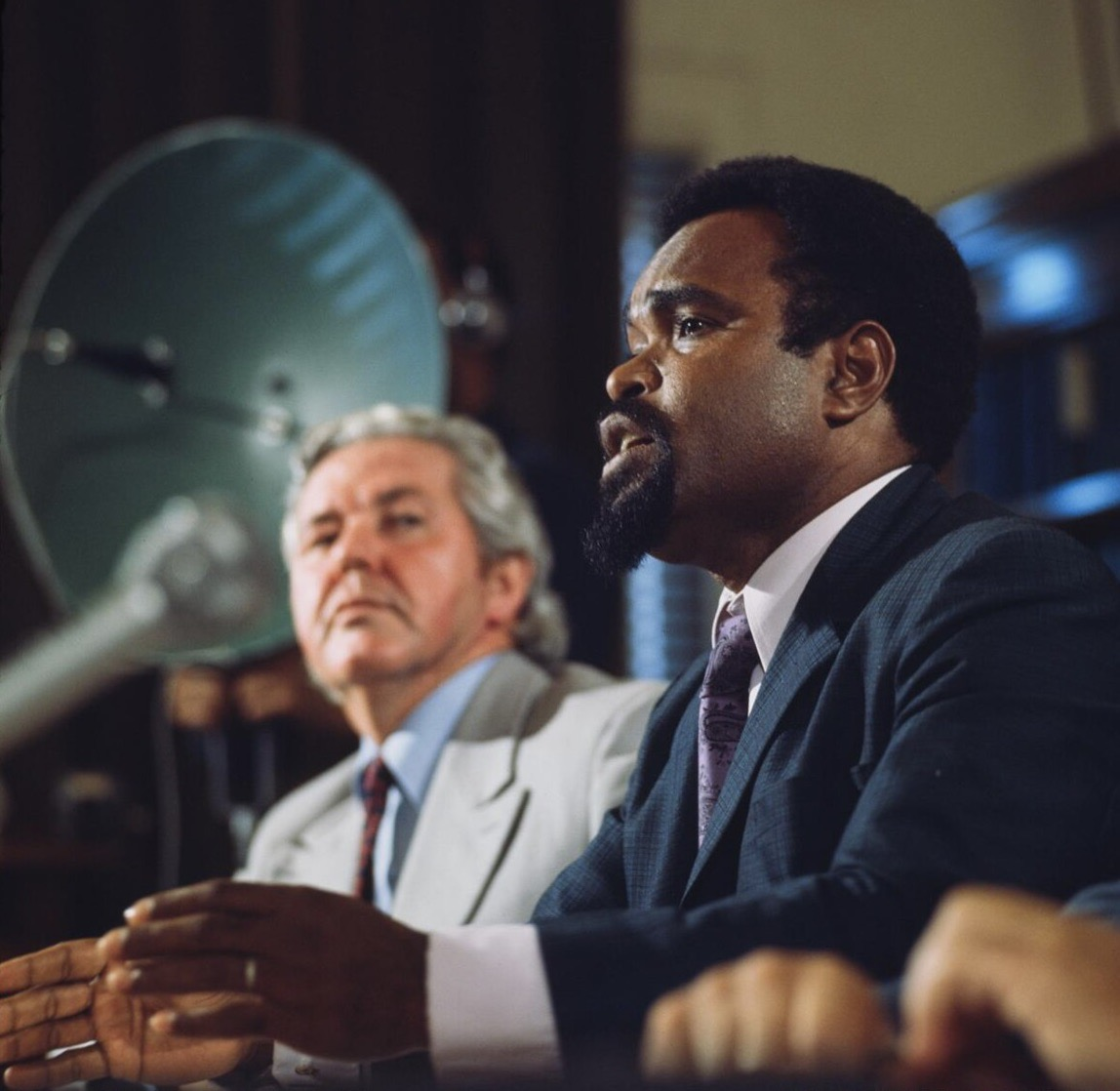
Somare in 1973 next to Australian minister Bill Morrison

Somare stressed his background in the small emerging modern sector of Papua New Guinea rather than his immersion in Sepik culture in two long interviews at the end of his career.

Later on, he was one of the 35 Papua New Guineans who went through a crash course that gave entry to the civil service. He was as a result also one of the few Papua New Guineans with a command of the English language. Therefore, he was qualified as a translator for the Legislative Council. This was a white-dominated institution but it gave him insight into the game of politics. He also became a radio announcer in Wewak, East Sepik. That was a great opportunity to make his name known in the area that elected him throughout his long career consistently as their MP. It also brought the ire of his supervisors because of his critical comments and they transferred him on administrative duties to Port Moresby. There he became part of the small group of educated nationalists that had the nickname of the bully beef club. This group protested already early on against the racist nature of colonial rule. Somare maintained that he was already in 1962 in favour of independence. He was in Port Moresby one of the founding members in 1967 of the Papua and Niugini Union party (Pangu). He stood for election when opportunities opened up for native Papua New Guineans to enter the National Assembly in 1968 and he was one of the eight Pangu candidates who were successful. He embarked in politics practising a judicious mixture of opposition to and co-optation by the Australian government. Pangu opted in 1968 for the opposition rather than having seats in government. From that position they consistently attacked the racist nature of colonial rule as they had also done outside parliament. Somare was leader of the opposition but he was also a member of the Constitutional Planning Committee preparing for independence. He was despite his radical position also a moderate. He argued for example for a period of internal self government. That was granted in 1973. Foreign affairs and defence remained an Australian responsibility until full independence was granted two years later.

Somare was particularly adept at steering a clear way among various conflicting forces. There were for example those who advocated that Papua New Guinea should become the seventh state in the Australian Federation. More important were the centrifugal forces in the country. There was a rival political party with mass following in the highlands, the Compass party. A separatist movement was pleading for separate independence for Papua apart from New Guinea. In Bougainville, there were forces claiming independence. There were conflicts among the Tolai in East New Britain. The People's Progress Party under the leadership of Julius Chan rather than Pangu was important on the islands. Somare succeeded in bringing all these centrifugal forces together at independence. Somare's advocacy of independence was radical as compared to the other parties who were much more in favour of the status quo. It was particularly important to sway the opinion of Julius Chan who was not keen on immediate independence. When that succeeded a coalition government between Pangu and the PPP became possible.

Some forces on the Australian side were also not in favour of independence for PNG, but it was definitely not the case that there was a veritable independence struggle. There was some protest against colonial practices, for example, a civil service strike pleading for equal treatment of PNG personnel with Australian personnel or protest against discriminatory practices. However, there was a fair amount of co-optation on the way to independence, especially after Gough Whitlam became prime minister of Australia. Since there has been access to the Australian archives from this period it was clear that Australia wanted to get rid of PNG already early on. The Australian government was keen to let the complexities of ruling PNG go. The possibility to declare Papua New Guinea an Australian state in the federation and making all inhabitants Australians was always rejected by Australia.

Michael Somare's role in the independence struggle reflects therefore the values he advocated throughout his career, as a builder of consensus and a politician whose main mission was avoiding or reconciling conflicts.

== Policymaker ==
Michael Somare was praised highly when he left politics in 2016. The most significant praise may be from Sean Dorney, a veteran specialist on PNG politics who praised him as a politician who led a highly-fractured political community to independence. Dorney also praised the enduring parliamentary democracy in such a fractured community. It is, however, significant that praise for Somare's policies was lacking. That is understandable because Somare was not conspicuous as a policymaker. His policies must often were derived from the actual course that he took reacting to events. Three areas of policy making illustrate that: agriculture, macroeconomic policies and development planning. PNG got as a parting gift at independence an economic analysis with recommendations. That stressed the need for rural development and Somare accepted that at that time. Yet in the course of years, PNG became an economy driven by resource extraction, and the agricultural sector remained stagnant.

Attention to the rural sector was driven by donors rather than by government, such as the World Bank's PNG Productive Partnerships in Agriculture or the PNG Rural Service Delivery Program. The Mining Act 1992 and the Oil and Gas Act 1998 are the most important documents regulating the rapid growth in extracting natural resources but were enacted when Somare was not in power. Nevertheless, the major LNG/PNG project was developed when he was prime minister from 2002 to 2011. There was however no major policy debate around the project. His son, Arthur Somare, was the prime driver of the project rather than prime minister Michael Somare. Michael Somare has however defended his track record with respect to LNG/PNG despite strong criticism of the deal to gain equity in the company. The Forestry Act 1991 is the main document regulating another natural resources sector. It was also enacted when Somare was not in power.

The deeds of Somare governments show one predominant trait in policy making: he was a fiscal conservative. Government expenditure was under control when he was prime minister. That was particularly clear from 2002 to 2011. When Somare succeeded Morauta as prime minister in 2002, there was a fear that Somare would undo the privatisation of the preceding government and move away from the politics of austerity. However, he left the reforms of the preceding Morauta government intact, and his fiscal rectitude fitted the IMF philosophy of structural adjustment. The IMF had much praise for the Somare government 2002–2011. Income from natural resources was high and the Somare government used it to reduce the public debt rather than increase public expenditure.

There was only one attempt to formulate a comprehensive development policy by a Somare government: the Vision 2050 document. However that became more an inspirational document than a concrete plan of action. The document is critical of PNG's performance since independence but it lays the blame in the first place on its citizenry rather than the government and government policies.

== Foreign relations ==
Michael Somare was a well travelled man when he became prime minister in 1975. He had for example visited East Africa, Sri Lanka. the United States. In accordance with his Sepik inspired philosophy of consensus he declared "friends with everybody and enemies of none" as the principle of his foreign relations.

Nevertheless, there were some countries to which he felt more friendly than others and the first one among those was Japan. He wrote warmly about the Japanese occupation during World War II of his home area East Sepik. For example: Contrary to the general opinion, he praised their treatment of local women. He travelled regularly to Japan and was awarded high Japanese honours. It is significant that he received as governor of East Sepik in 2014 the Japanese prime minister in Wewak who laid a wreath remembering Japanese war dead. These sympathies for Japan did not deter him from opening diplomatic relations with China soon after independence.

Indonesia is the second country that figured large in international relations during the Somare era, but that was not because of buoyant international ties. PNG mainly attempted to remain as passive as possible towards the violent conflict between proponents of West Papua independence and the Indonesian government. The Indonesian sovereignty over West Papua region was never questioned. There was initially a great reluctance to even question the human rights situation in the region. That changed after a big uprising in Jayapura, the capital of Irian Jaya in 1984. This brought many refugees to PNG. PNG protested about the way Indonesia dealt with the uprising in the UN General Assembly. However, repatriation of the refugees had been the major policy aim since independence and it always remained the major policy plank of the PNG government. Initially, Somare resisted even involvement of the UNHCR. Problems at the border including military incursions were meant to be solved by boundary commissions and other diplomatic means. The West Papuan independence movement was keen to be admitted as a member of the Melanesian Spearhead Group (MSG) which is resisted by Indonesia. PNG has never opposed Indonesia's view. However, in 2013, when Somare was no longer in government, he advocated representation of West Papua on the MSG during the silver jubilee celebrations of the group. However, he remained unequivocally of the opinion that it was an internal problem of Indonesia and questioning Indonesian sovereignty over West Papua was beyond the pale. West Papua should be represented as a Melanesian community and not as an independent sovereign state. He suggested a presence of the West Papuans at the MSG on similar terms as China tolerated Hong Kong and Taiwan at APEC.

Australia is the third focal point of international relations in the Somare era. The nature of these relations were to a large degree dependent upon the Australian politicians involved. Somare and Kevin Rudd had for example warm relations. Somare was however often keen to demonstrate his nationalism in relations with Australia. That sentiment appeared in incidents: First: At the time of Papua New Guinea independence in 1975 Somare demanded proper dignity for Papua New Guinean leaders when he considered that Australia's gift of an official house for Papua New Guinea's prime minister was insufficiently grand for the great statesman he considered himself to be: Australia abashedly acceded to Somare's demands and provided a much more palatial official residence. The intended and despised prime ministerial residence was instead designated the residence of the Australian High Commissioner. Second: In March 2005 Somare was required by security officers at Brisbane Airport to remove his shoes during a routine departure security check. He took strong exception to this, leading to a diplomatic contretemps and a significant cooling of relations between Australia and Papua New Guinea. Somare was travelling on a regular scheduled flight, and he was unknown to security staff. His sandals had stiffening metal strips, which were detected by a walk-through scanner. The Australian government ignored diplomatic protests as the PNG government had not arranged a diplomatic visit, in a state or chartered aircraft. A protest march in Port Moresby saw hundreds march on the Australian High Commission and present a petition to High Commissioner Michael Potts demanding an apology and compensation. However, the Australian Government ignored the matter.

A third incident where Somare asserted independence from Australia was the Moti affair. Julian Moti, was arrested in Port Moresby on 29 September 2006 under an Australian extradition request to face child sex charges over an alleged incident in Vanuatu in 1997. After breaking bail conditions and taking sanctuary in the Solomon Islands High Commission Moti was flown to the Solomon Islands on a clandestine PNG Defence Force flight. Moti was a close associate of Manasseh Sogavare, the Prime Minister of the Solomon Islands, This caused outrage on the part of the Australian government. Australia then cancelled ministerial-level talks in December and banned senior Papua New Guinea ministers from entering Australia. Somare denied any involvement in authorising the flight. However, he refused the release of a commission of enquiry from the PNG Defence Force in the matter.

Somare has been regularly blunt in his opinion on the relations with Australia. After returning to power in 2002, he indicated that he would manage the relationship with Australia in a different way from the close and consultative style of his predecessor Mekere Morauta. Somare strongly opposed the Morauta government's acceptance of asylum seekers under the Pacific solution program. At the celebrations of thirty years of independence in 2005, Somare complained that Australia was seeking to take control again and was prepared to totally destroy PNG's reputation.

== Controversy ==
Somare's valedictory speech in parliament may have sounded like a triumph but there was disappointment on his part. He initially refused to give such a speech in parliament as he was not awarded enough time and attention. Afterwards, the family, the political party that he had belonged to and the highly respected veteran politician Dame Carol Kidu complained about the relatively short ceremony while they had expected a military parade, singing groups, etc. Later a more elaborate ceremony was performed in Sir John Guise Stadium in Port Moresby that was – maybe due to unseasonal rain - poorly attended. This was followed by a farewell tour of the country. Somare was, however, by that time, no longer an undisputed authority. A large part of the PNG population looked with increasing scepticism at Somare and his pronouncements. The first reason that Somare has faded from political importance is that he succeeded less and less to cultivate a consensus. He gained prestige after 2002 when he presided over a government that lasted its full term of five years, the first such occurrence since independence. This stability continued from 2007 to 2011. The reason was seen in a new set of rules that were adopted under the Organic Law on the Integrity of Political Parties and Candidates (OLIPPAC) that had as a central aim to promote party identification and to curb short term opportunistic behaviour among MPs. A major new rule proscribing MPs from changing party affiliation during a parliamentary period. However, the prime minister retained the power to change his cabinet and as a result, this apparent stability glossed over sharp conflicts in the government. Between 2002 and 2007, there were five deputy prime ministers, several cabinet reshuffles, ministers sacked and parties divided – hardly a sign of political stability. OLIPPAC was also considered as unconstitutional by the Supreme Court. Amidst this instability, there was no attempt to groom a successor. Bart Philemon, the Finance Minister challenged Somare's leadership of the National Alliance Party in 2007, but he was then dumped by the party and crossed over to the opposition. The only person who gained significant power during this period was Somare's son Arthur, the Angoram Open MP and it became apparent that he was being groomed as the preferred successor.

The second reason is Somare's refusal to have his authority challenged in parliament, even when there was no chance of dismissal of his government. Somare was threatened with many motions of no confidence. Initially, he wanted to extend the period in which no motions of confidence were allowed after an election and before an election. The courts prevented this. Thereafter he relied on the speaker and interpretations of parliamentary rules to prevent a motion of no confidence being raised. He did not take it lightly when that was challenged: The Sydney Morning Herald reported on 22 July 2010 that he had threatened to kill an opposition MP: "There were wild scenes when the Speaker adjourned the house until 16 November, despite the opposition's claim it had enough votes to stop the adjournment. Once most MPs had left parliament and the yelling and cries of dictatorship died down, Mr Somare crossed the floor, pointed his finger at an MP, Sam Basil, and shouted in Toc pisin words that translate as: If you were outside this chamber I would kill you." By using his influence over the speaker Somare prevented all motions of no confidence and this is puzzling; it was also doubtful that such a motion would succeed on the floor of parliament. He returned to power after the elections in 2007 with large support in parliament. He was only unseated in 2011 when he was hospitalized in Singapore for an extended period because of complications after heart surgery and it became apparent that he may not be able to return. At this point his support in the National Alliance party split and the Speaker obtained support to declare the prime minister's post vacant. An adversary motion of no confidence was avoided. During the constitutional crisis (2011–2012) he never accepted a loss of his parliamentary majority. In January 2012 he attempted to take power through a military coup that failed as the army, civil service and police were backing his rival Peter O’Neill. He had only the support of 20 MPs but the courts had backed him up. He relied on the law as well to get a compensation of a million US dollars for not being reinstated as PM during the constitutional crisis.

The third reason is the involvement of the Somare family in questionable practices in the logging industry. A commission of enquiry into the logging industry was set up under the chairmanship of the Judge Tos Barnett, The Barnett Commission found widespread corruption surrounding the issue of government licensing of concessions. The name of Michael Somare turned up in connection with one of these concessions in his home area, the Sepik River Development Corporation. According to the Barnett Commission, Somare lied under oath when he denied his links with this concession. The commission recommended referral to the Ombudsman Commission. Complaints about governance issues need in PNG in first instance to be referred to that institution. This recommendation had no immediate consequence for Somare, but it was not the end of the controversy. The Australian newspaper published in 2008 a series of articles in which the Somare family was connected to two more illegal concessions. In all these schemes there was a Malaysian partner. Michael Somare denied again his involvement but he had to retract this and claimed that it was his son Arthur who was involved in the first place. When carbon trading emerged, Michael Somare, supported this enthusiastically and PNG became an active member and maybe initiator of the Coalition for Rainforest Nation and the country aimed to participate in the REDD program. (Reducing Emissions from Deforestation and Forest Degradation in Developing Countries (UN-REDD). Somare declared himself however deeply disappointed in the REDD program at the Oslo conference on climate change in 2010. The problem was not corruption and other governance problems on the part of developing countries, but the issue was that “ Today, markets value forests more destroyed than standing". Somare's great complaint is however about conditionality. His enthusiasm for REDD is said to be motivated to get away from conditionality on logging suggested by the World Bank and the idea of carbon credits evolved in a speculative frenzy.

The fourth reason for the decline in prestige of Michael Somare is the lack of modesty. The Melanesian way expects big men to be modest. Somare has always asserted himself in a big way, for example by assuming the honorific Grand Chief. In 1998, his portrait appeared on the reverse side of the K. 50 bank note. This was to honour his role in attaining independence. However, this public show of prominence suits more a presidential system than a Westminster style parliamentary democracy. The problematic presentation of the self by Somare was also evident in his appearance before a Leadership tribunal following complaints about not handing in financial returns as required by the leadership code. The leadership tribunal was composed of three expatriate judges. He was found guilty of submitting late and incomplete annual financial statements, dating back to the 1990s. As a result, he was suspended from office for two weeks without pay. That was a majority judgment of two judges. Judge Sir Robin Auld dissented. He was the only Judge that called for dismissal: Michael Somare's attitude as prime minister showed "a disregard bordering on disdain for his constitutional obligations. It would be bad enough in the case of any leader, but it is particularly reprehensible for one of his high standing and influential involvement in the initiation of the leadership code". There were cheers from a large crowd of well wishers when he appeared from the court. Somare regretted his administrative oversight and seemed without rancor. His daughter Bertha –the spokeswoman for the family- asked for understanding from the foreign press: "He is not a politician like they have in Australia, or places like that," she said. "There has to be, I guess, an understanding of Papua New Guinea. Everybody watched this very public, if you like, humiliation of him for the last couple of months and I think the majority of Papua New Guineans were very relieved at the judgment made by two of the three (judges)."I guess there was a sense of relief throughout the country." The significance of the Leadership Tribunal was thus the first in the challenge to his prestige. That challenge was also evident in the suggestion in 2008 by opposition politician Bart Philemon that Sir Michael Somare gives an explanation on how he obtained a A$349,000 three-bedroom executive-style apartment with private plunge pool in inner-city Cairns. His son Arthur Somare who was then PNG's State Enterprise Minister was also questioned about a A$685,000 four-bedroom home he had bought two months prior at Trinity Beach.

The fifth reason came after Somare left office. His name and that of his son Michael Somare jr, were mentioned in a case of fraud and money laundering relating to a scheme to build community colleges in PNG. The Sydney Morning Herald accused Somare of accepting a one million dollar bribe from the Chinese telecommunications firm ZTE in the pursuit of contracts. They based it on evidence from their own research by Fairfax newspapers and Singapore court records. Michael Somare maintained that he never accepted bribes or inducements.

== Personal life ==
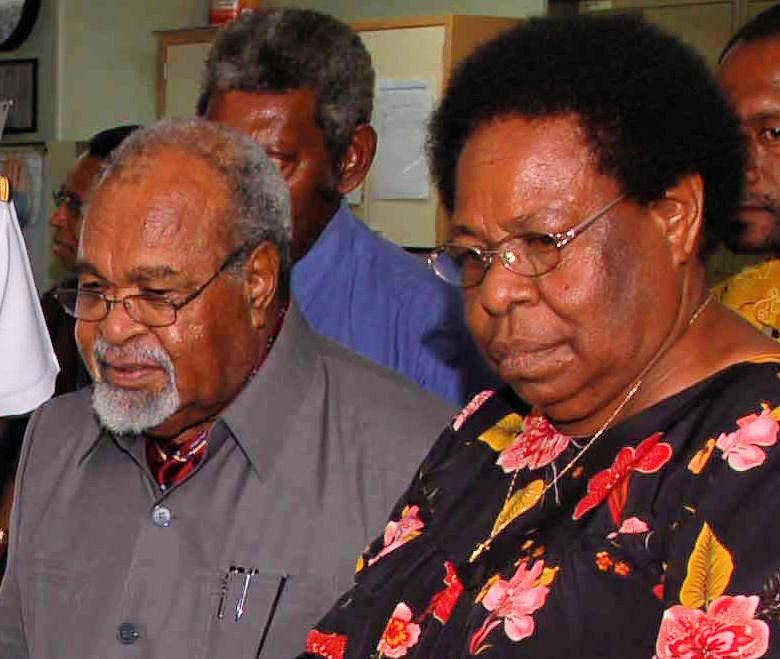
Somare and his wife Veronica, Lady Somare.

Somare married his wife Veronica, Lady Somare (generally referred to as "Lady Veronica Somare") in 1965, having courted her in traditional fashion, and then immediately left to take up his scholarship at Administrative College. They had five children, Bertha (usually called "Betha" in the national press), Sana, Arthur, Michael Jnr and Dulciana. Somare was head of both his own family and that of his wife, Veronica Lady Somare, who initiated him into their title mindamot two days after his initiation as sana.

Somare died from pancreatic cancer in Port Moresby on 25 February 2021, at age 84.

== Honours ==
Somare received several honorary doctorates, the first being from the University of the Philippines in 1976. Somare was appointed a member of Her Majesty's Most Honourable Privy Council in 1977 (as in Australia, the honorific "The Right Honourable" can only be granted when one is admitted to the British Privy Council), and was made a Knight Grand Cross of the Order of St Michael and St George (GCMG) by the Queen in the Birthday Honours List of 1990. In 2004 he received authorization from cabinet to create an honours system for Papua New Guinea. In 2005, the Princess Royal vested him as one of the first Grand Companions of the Order of Logohu (GCL).

== Awards ==
=== Commonwealth honours ===
Country	Award or Order	Class or Position	Dates	Citation
United Kingdom	Privy Council of the United Kingdom	Privy Counsellor	1977	
United Kingdom	Order of the Companions of Honour	Member of the Order of the Companions of Honour	1978	
United Kingdom	Order of St Michael and St George	Knight Grand Cross	1991	
Papua New Guinea	Order of Logohu	Grand Companion	2005	
Fiji	Order of Fiji	Companion	year unknown (2005?)	
United Kingdom (Royal Order)	Venerable Order of Saint John	Knight of Justice	year unknown	

=== Foreign honours ===
Country	Award or Order	Class or Position	Dates	Citation
Vatican City	Order of St. Gregory the Great	Knight	1992	
Japan	Order of the Rising Sun	Grand Cordon	2015	

Political offices
New office	Chief Minister of Papua and New Guinea; 1973–1975	Position abolished
New office	Prime Minister of Papua New Guinea; 1975–1980	Succeeded by Julius Chan
Preceded by Julius Chan	Prime Minister of Papua New Guinea; 1982–1985	Succeeded by Paias Wingti
Preceded by Mekere Morauta	Prime Minister of Papua New Guinea; 2002–2010	Succeeded by Sam Abal; Acting
Preceded by Sam Abal; Acting	Prime Minister of Papua New Guinea; 2011	Succeeded by Sam Abal; Acting
Preceded by Rabbie Namaliu	Leader of the Opposition; 1992–1993	Succeeded by Chris Haiveta
Preceded by Bill Skate	Leader of the Opposition; 2001–2002	Succeeded by Mekere Morauta
