= PNG Power =

PNG Power Limited (PPL) is an electric company responsible for the generation, transmission, distribution and retailing of electricity throughout Papua New Guinea.

PPL serves customers in almost all urban centres throughout the country encompassing industrial, commercial, government and domestic sectors. Where possible, the services extend to rural communities adjacent to these urban centres.

PPL is also presently undertaking a regulatory role on behalf of the Independence Consumer and Competition Commission (ICCC). These responsibilities include approving licenses for electrical contractors, providing certification for models of electrical equipment and appliances to be sold in Papua New Guinea and providing safety advisory services and checks for major installations.

PNG Power Limited (Company No 1-44680), was incorporated under Section 3 (1) of the Electricity Commission (Privatization) Act 2002 as the successor company to the Papua New Guinea Electricity Commission (ELCOM). All of ELCOM's assets, liabilities, rights, titles and personnel were transferred to PPL.
