= List of colonial governors of Papua New Guinea =

This article lists the colonial governors of Papua New Guinea, from the establishment of German New Guinea in 1884 until the independence of the Territory of Papua and New Guinea in 1975.

== List ==
(Dates in italics indicate de facto continuation of office)

=== German New Guinea / Territory of New Guinea ===
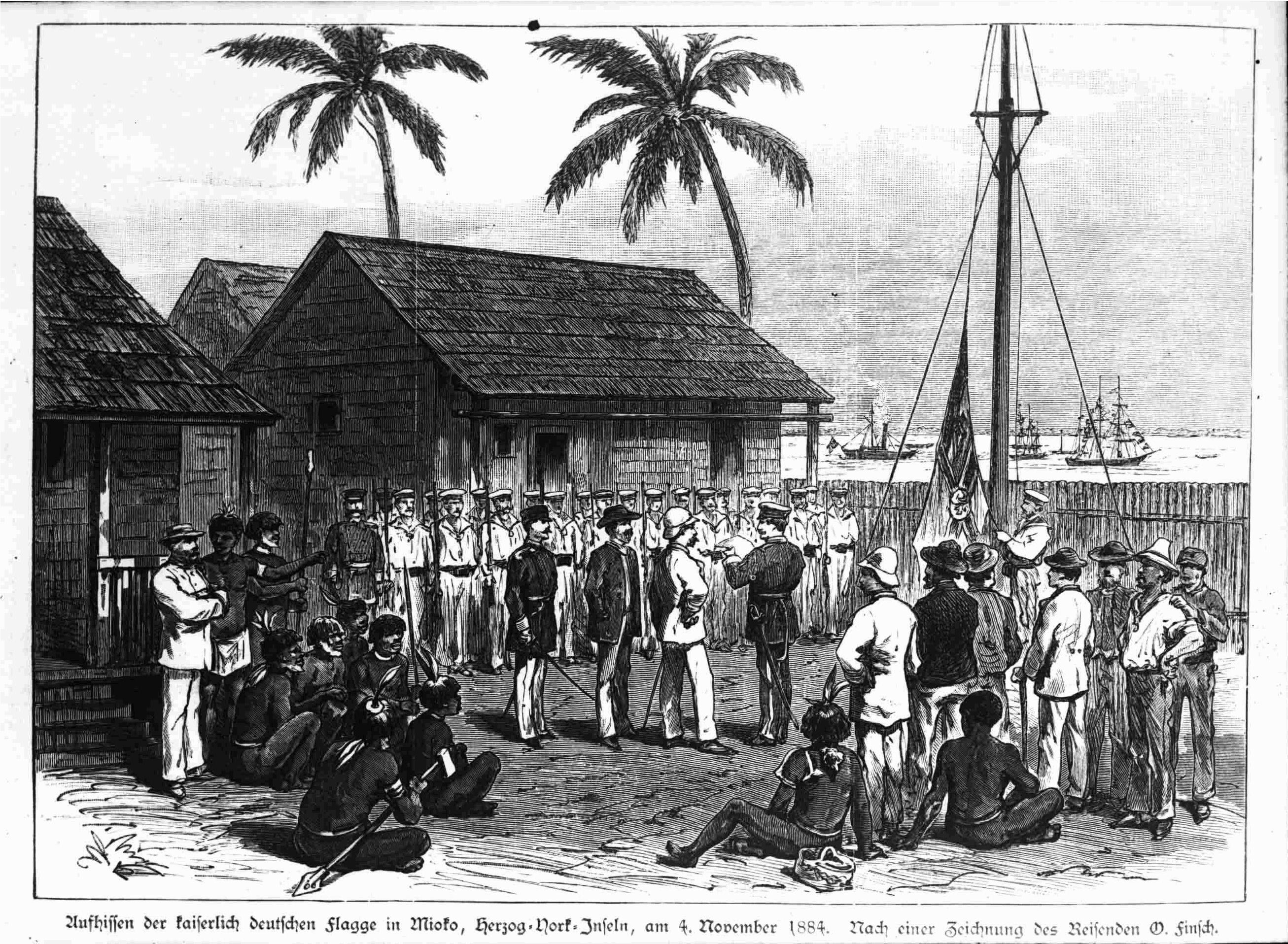
Hoisting the German flag on Mioko Island, Neulauenburg (now Duke of York Islands), Bismarck Archipelago on 4 November 1884.

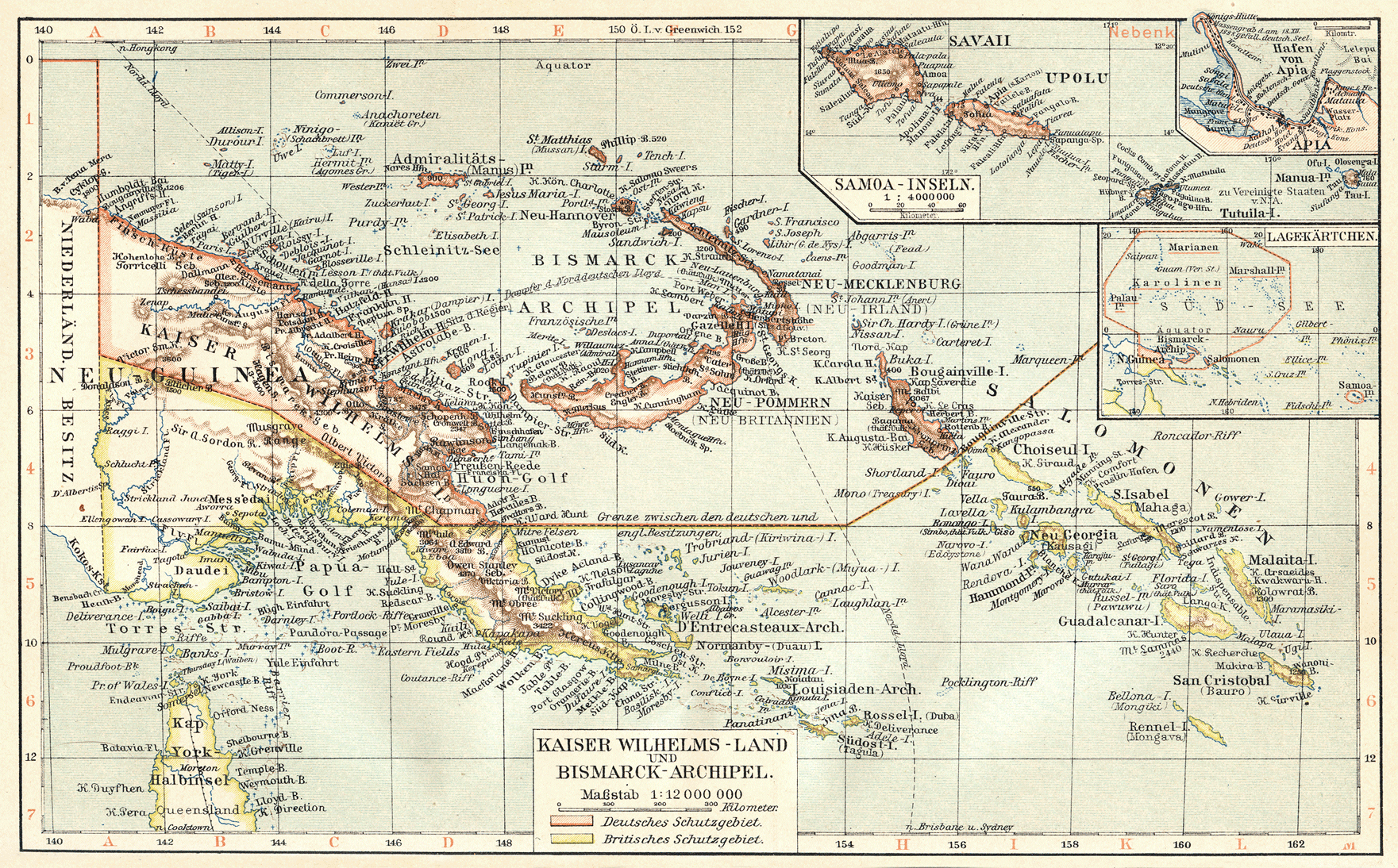
Kaiser-Wilhelmsland, the Bismarck Archipelago and the Samoan Islands (bordered in red), 1905.

The German colonial empire in the Pacific Ocean. German New Guinea is shown in brown.

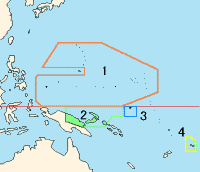
League of Nations mandates in the Pacific Ocean. The Territory of New Guinea (bordered in green) is number 2.

Tenure	Portrait	Incumbent	Notes
Commissioner of German New Guinea (1885–1887)
1885 to January 1887		Gustav von Oertzen	
Landeshauptleute of the German New Guinea Company (1886–1889)
10 June 1886 to 1 March 1888		Georg von Schleinitz	
1 March 1888 to 31 October 1889		Reinhold Kraetke	
Commissioner of German New Guinea (1889–1892)
1 November 1889 to 31 August 1892		Fritz Rose	Acting to 30 September 1890
Landeshauptleute of the German New Guinea Company (1892–1898)
1 September 1892 to 3 March 1895		Georg Schmiele	
3 March 1895 to 17 August 1896		Hugo Rüdiger	
22 September 1896 to 13 August 1897		Curt von Hagen	Died in office
15 August 1897 to 11 September 1897		Albert Hahl	First time, acting
11 September 1897 to 16 October 1898		Hugo Skopnik	Acting
In 1899, following the German–Spanish Treaty, the German Empire assumed direct control of the colony from the German New Guinea Company, appointing a governor.
Governors of German New Guinea (1899–1914)
1 April 1899 to 10 July 1901		Rudolf von Bennigsen	
10 July 1901 to 13 April 1914		Albert Hahl	Second time, acting to 10 November 1902
13 April 1914 to 17 October 1914		Eduard Haber	Acting
In 1914, as part of the Asian and Pacific theatre of World War I, an expeditionary force from Australia called the Australian Naval and Military Expeditionary Force (AN&MEF) captured and occupied the territory following the Battle of Bita Paka and the Siege of Toma. In 1920, the territory was turned into a League of Nations mandate, administered by Australia, and formalized with the passage of the New Guinea Act 1920.
Military Administrators of the Territory of New Guinea (1914–1921)
11 November 1914 to 8 January 1915		Colonel William Holmes	Killed in the Battle of Messines (1917)
8 January 1915 to 21 October 1917		Colonel Samuel Pethebridge	
21 October 1917 to 21 April 1918		Seaforth Simpson Mackenzie	Acting
21 April 1918 to 1 May 1920		George Johnston	
1 May 1920 to 21 March 1921		Thomas Griffiths	First time
Administrators of the Territory of New Guinea (1921–1942)
21 May 1921 to 13 June 1933		Evan Wisdom	
13 June 1933 to 12 September 1934		Thomas Griffiths	Second time, acting
12 September 1934 to December 1942		Walter McNicoll	From 14 December 1937, Sir Walter Ramsay McNicoll; in Australia from 24 January 1942
24 January 1942 to 12 February 1942		Kenneth Carlyle McMullen	Acting for McNicoll
Japanese Commanders of occupied New Guinea (1942–1945)
21 January 1942 to 1942		Tomitarō Horii	
9 November 1942 to 13 September 1945		Hatazō Adachi	Commander of the 18th Army
9 November 1942 to 6 September 1945		Hitoshi Imamura	Commander of the 8th Area Army, based at Rabaul, in charge of New Guinea islands
U.S. Military Commanders (1943–1944)
June 1943 to September 1944		Walter Krueger	Commander of the 6th Army
September 1944 to December 1944		Robert L. Eichelberger	Commander of the 8th Army
Heads of the New Guinea Administrative Unit (1942)
14 February 1942 to 15 February 1942		George Wilfred Lambert Townsend	Based in Port Moresby
15 February 1942 to 10 April 1942		Kenneth Carlyle McMullen	Based in Port Moresby

In 1945, the Territory of New Guinea was merged with the Territory of Papua to form the Territory of Papua and New Guinea. The merger was formalized with the passage of the Papua and New Guinea Act 1949.

=== British New Guinea / Territory of Papua ===
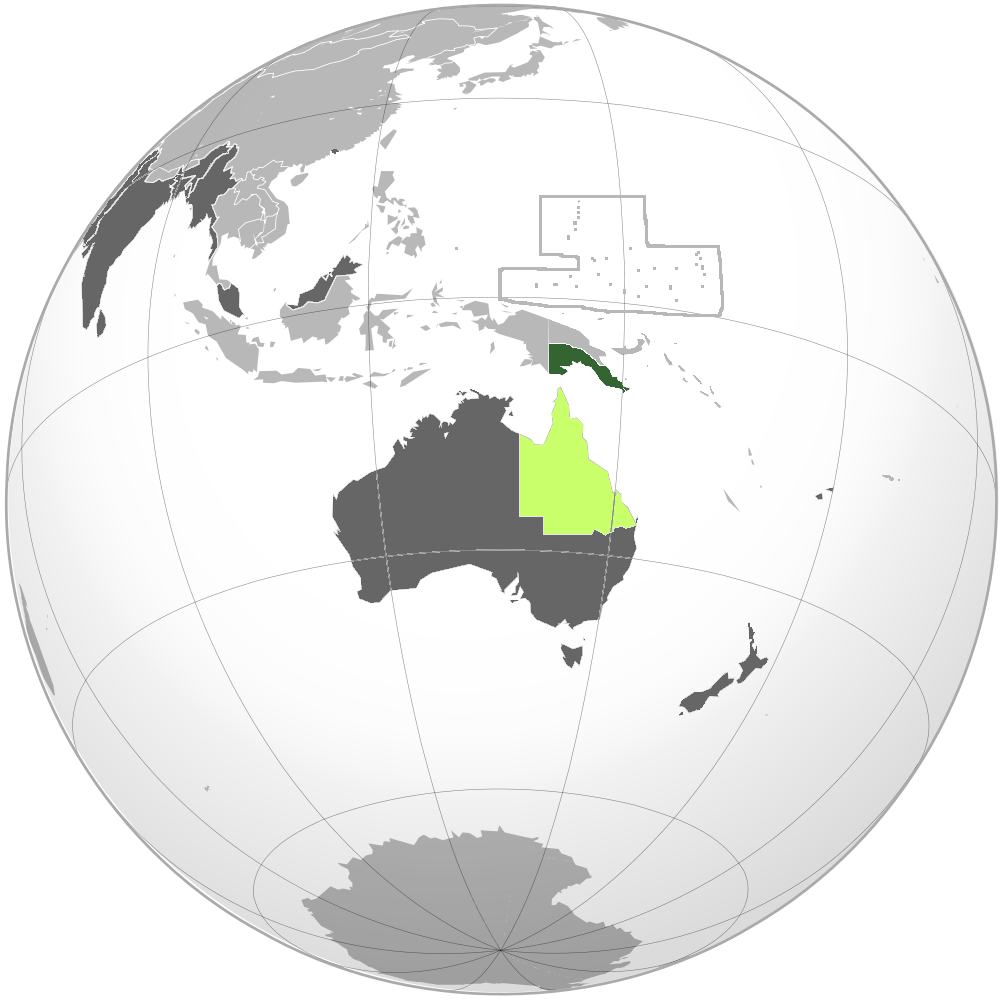
The Territory of Papua (shown in green) with Queensland (shown in light green).

Flag of the Lieutenant-Governors of Papua between 1906 and 1946.

Tenure	Portrait	Incumbent	Notes
Magistrate for Queensland in New Guinea (1883)
3 April 1883 to 2 July 1883		Henry Majoribanks Chester	Police Magistrate on Thursday Island
Special Commissioners for Great Britain in New Guinea (1884–1885)
6 November 1884 to 2 December 1885		Peter Scratchley	From 6 June 1885, Sir Peter Scratchley. Died in office
2 December 1885 to 1886		Hugh Hastings Romilly	Acting
1886 to 1887		John Douglas	
Administrator of British New Guinea (1888–1895)
1888 to 1895		Sir William MacGregor	
Lieutenant-Governors of British New Guinea (1895–1904)
1895 to 1897		Sir William MacGregor	
1898 to 1903		George Le Hunte	
1903 to 1904		Christopher Stansfield Robinson	Acting administrator
Lieutenant-Governors of Papua (1904–1942)
1904 to 1907		Francis Rickman Barton	Acting. The territory was renamed from British New Guinea to Papua with the passage of the Papua Act 1905
1908 to 27 February 1940		Sir Hubert Murray	Died in office
27 February 1940 to 1942		Hubert Leonard Murray	Nephew of Sir Hubert Murray; acting
Military Administrator (1942–1946)
13 February 1942 to 31 October 1945		Major General Basil Morris	Commander of the 8th Military District
Head of the Papuan Civil Administrative Unit (1942)
14 February 1942 to 10 April 1942		Sydney Elliott-Smith	In Port Moresby
General Officers Commanding of the Australian New Guinea Administrative Unit [ANGAU] (1942–1946)
10 April 1942 to August 1942		Kenneth Carlyle McMullen	In Port Moresby
August 1942 to 24 June 1946		Major General Basil Morris	In Port Moresby until October 1945, afterwards in Lae. Styled as Head of the ANGAU until 7 February 1944
4 September 1944 to 9 December 1944		Brigadier Donald Cleland	Acting for Morris

In 1945, the Territory of Papua was merged with the Territory of New Guinea to form the Territory of Papua and New Guinea. The merger was formalized with the passage of the Papua and New Guinea Act 1949.

=== Territory of Papua and New Guinea ===
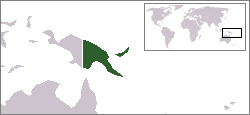
The Territory of Papua and New Guinea (shown in green).

Tenure	Portrait	Incumbent	Notes
Administrators of Papua and New Guinea (1945–1973)
11 October 1945 to 5 June 1952		Jack Keith Murray OBE	Provisional to 1 July 1949
July 1952 to December 1966		Brigadier Donald Cleland CBE	From 10 June 1961, Sir Donald Cleland
9 January 1967 to 1970		David Hay CBE, DSO	
1970 to 1 December 1973		Leslie Wilson Johnson CBE	In 1972, the name of the territory was changed to Papua New Guinea
December 1973		William Kearney CBE	Acting
High Commissioners of Papua New Guinea (1973–1975)
December 1973		William Kearney CBE	Acting
1 December 1973 to March 1974		Leslie Wilson Johnson CBE	
March 1974 to 16 September 1975		Thomas Kingston Critchley AO, CBE	Afterwards served as the Australian High Commissioner to Papua New Guinea until 1978

On 16 September 1975, Papua New Guinea achieved independence following the passage of the Papua New Guinea Independence Act 1975. For a list of viceroys in Papua New Guinea after independence, see Governor-General of Papua New Guinea.

== See also ==
- History of Papua New Guinea
- Politics of Papua New Guinea
- Governor-General of Papua New Guinea
- Prime Minister of Papua New Guinea
