= List of acts of the Parliament of Australia from 1905 =

This is a list of acts of the Parliament of Australia for the year 1905.

== 1905 ==
Short title, or popular name	Citation	Royal assent
Long title
Supply Act (No. 1) 1905-6 (repealed)	No. 1 of 1905	8 July 1905
An Act to grant and apply out of the Consolidated Revenue Fund a sum for the service of the year ending the thirtieth day of June One thousand nine hundred and six.
Jury Exemption Act 1905 (repealed)	No. 2 of 1905	17 August 1905
An Act to Exempt certain Persons holding Public Positions in the Commonwealth from Serving as Jurors.
Supply Act (No. 2) 1905-6 (repealed)	No. 3 of 1905	25 August 1905
An Act to grant and apply out of the Consolidated Revenue Fund a sum for the service of the year ending the thirtieth day of June One thousand nine hundred and six.
Evidence Act 1905 (repealed)	No. 4 of 1905	25 August 1905
An Act relating to the Law of Evidence.
Service and Execution of Process Act 1905 (repealed)	No. 5 of 1905	25 August 1905
An Act to amend the Service and Execution of Process Act 1901. (Note: Service and Execution of Process Act 1901 (No. 11))
Appropriation (Works and Buildings) Act 1905-6 (repealed)	No. 6 of 1905	28 September 1905
An Act to grant and apply a sum out of the Consolidated Revenue Fund to the service of the year ending the thirtieth day of June One thousand nine hundred and six for the purposes of Additions, New Works, Buildings, &c.
Supply Act (No. 3) 1905-6 (repealed)	No. 7 of 1905	28 September 1905
An Act to grant and apply out of the Consolidated Revenue Fund a sum for the service of the year ending the thirtieth day of June One thousand nine hundred and six.
Wireless Telegraphy Act 1905 (repealed)	No. 8 of 1905	18 October 1905
An Act relating to Wireless Telegraphy.
Papua Act 1905 (repealed)	No. 9 of 1905	16 November 1905
An Act to provide for the acceptance of British New Guinea as a Territory under the authority of the Commonwealth, and for the Government thereof. (Repealed by Papua and New Guinea Act 1949 (No. 9)
Secret Commissions Act 1905 (repealed)	No. 10 of 1905	16 November 1905
An Act relating to Secret Commissions, Rebates, and Profits.
Representation Act 1905 (repealed)	No. 11 of 1905	23 November 1905
An Act relating to the Representation of the several States in the House of Representatives.
Life Assurance Companies Act 1905 (repealed)	No. 12 of 1905	23 November 1905
An Act relating to Assurance on the Lives of Children by Life Assurance Companies or Societies.
Acts Publication Act 1905 (repealed)	No. 13 of 1905	23 November 1905
An Act to incorporate Amendments in Amended Acts.
Appropriation Act 1905-6 (repealed)	No. 14 of 1905	30 November 1905
An Act to grant and apply a sum out of the Consolidated Revenue Fund to the service of the year ending the thirtieth day of June One thousand nine hundred and six and to appropriate the supplies granted for such year in this Session of the Parliament.
Census and Statistics Act 1905	No. 15 of 1905	8 December 1905
An Act relating to the Census and Statistics of the Commonwealth.
Commerce (Trade Descriptions) Act 1905	No. 16 of 1905	8 December 1905
An Act relating to Commerce with other Countries.
Immigration Restriction Amendment Act 1905 (repealed)	No. 17 of 1905	21 December 1905
An Act to amend the Immigration Restriction Act 1901. (Note: Immigration Restriction Act 1901 (No. 17))
Queen Victoria Memorial Act 1905 (repealed)	No. 18 of 1905	21 December 1905
An Act to grant and apply out of the Consolidated Revenue Fund the sum of Twenty-five thousand pounds for the purposes of the erection of a Memorial in honour of the late Queen Victoria.
Contract Immigrants Act 1905 (repealed)	No. 19 of 1905	21 December 1905
An Act relating to Immigrants under Contract to perform Manual Labour in the Commonwealth.
Trade Marks Act 1905 (Australia) (repealed)	No. 20 of 1905	21 December 1905
An Act relating to Trade Marks.
Supplementary Appropriation Act 1903-4 and 1904-5 (repealed)	No. 21 of 1905	21 December 1905
Supplementary Appropriation (Works and Buildings) Act 1903-4 and 1904-5 (repealed)	No. 22 of 1905	21 December 1905
Sugar Bounty Act 1905 (repealed)	No. 23 of 1905	21 December 1905
Excise Tariff 1905 (repealed)	No. 24 of 1905	21 December 1905
Copyright Act 1905 (repealed)	No. 25 of 1905	21 December 1905
An Act relating to Copyright.
Commonwealth Electoral Act 1905 (repealed)	No. 26 of 1905	21 December 1905
An Act to amend the Law relating to Parliamentary Elections.

== Sources ==
- "legislation.gov.au".
