= Papua New Guinea and the International Monetary Fund =

Flag of Papua New Guinea

Papua New Guinea joined the International Monetary Fund on October 9, 1975, one day before uniting with the United Nations. However, still in the early stages of independence which they gained on September 16, 1975, Papua New Guinea found itself in the face of turmoil due to political and economic mismanagement. Since joining the IMF, Papua New Guinea has had a 0.6% growth in Gross Domestic Product (GDP). As of 2022, Papua New Guinea has had 5 loan arrangements, 259.01 million in Special Drawing Rights (SDR), a quota of 263.2 million, and a total number of 4,091 votes.

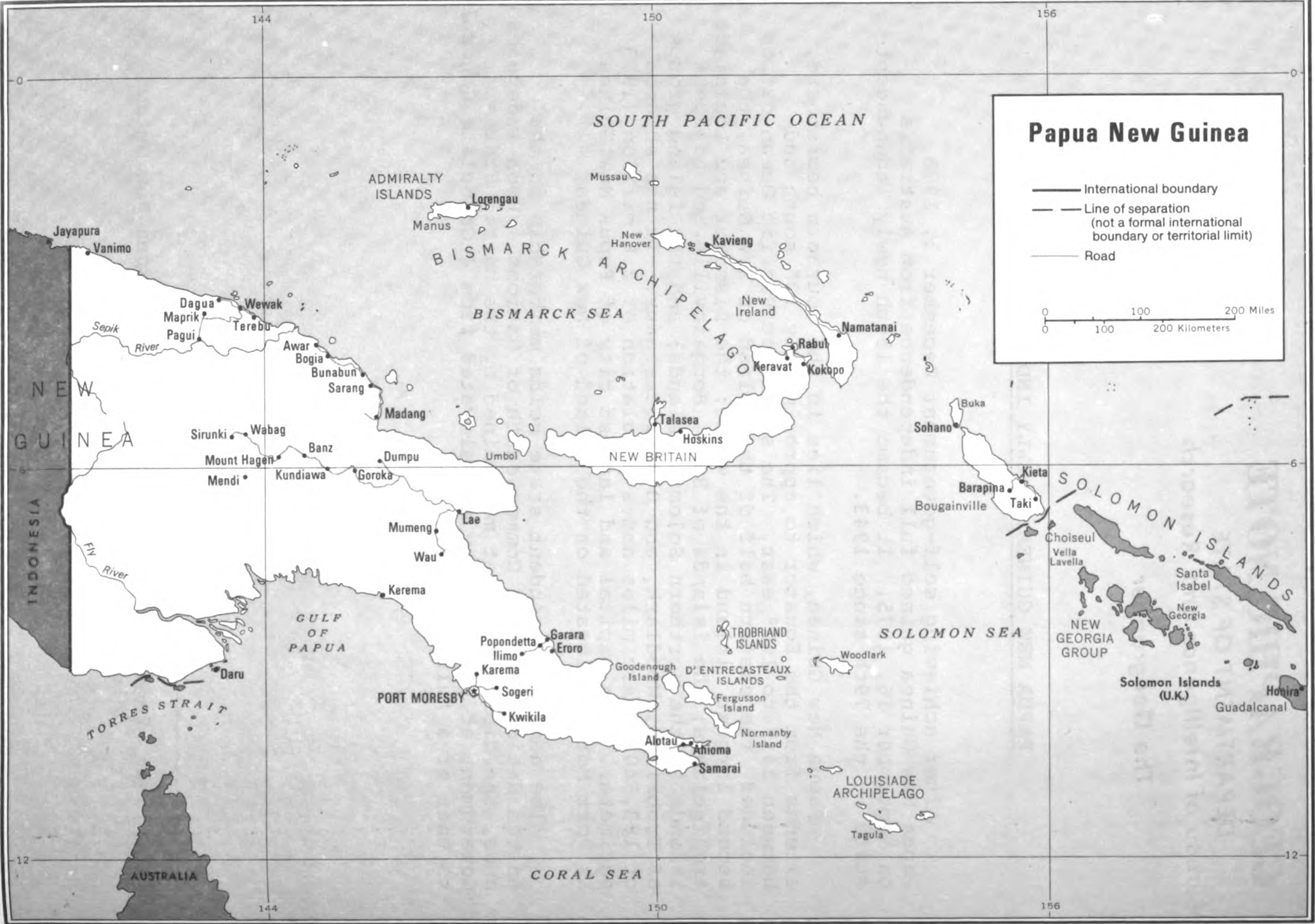
Map of Papua New Guinea

== Brief History of Papua New Guinea ==
=== Before IMF ===
Before joining the International Monetary Fund, Papua New Guinea comprised two territories, the British Papua and the German New Guinea, both owned by the Australian government post-WWI as mandated by the League of Nations. On December 1, 1973, Papua New Guinea was given the ability to govern itself and eventually on September 16, 1975, the country dissolved all ties with Australia and became an independent nation. Additionally, the new-found nation joined the United Nations on October 10, 1975, one day after joining the IMF.

=== After Independence ===
Prospects for Papua New Guinea's newly independent government and economy were optimistic, most notably for the nation's internal development. However, mostly focused on welfare, economic growth was placed as a secondary objective. This was mainly due to the rise in economic growth decades prior, however the optimism for growth both in the nation's quality of life and economy couldn't have been more wrong. After 1975, Papua New Guinea began facing a steady decline in economic growth as prices in commodity fell, unemployment rose, and foreign debts increased.

== Joining the International Monetary Fund ==
=== Economy Before and After IMF ===
Although GDP averaged at 5.5% from 1960-1975, growth slowly declined thereafter. From 1976-2004, GDP averaged at 2.3%, with it averaging at about 1% moving closer to 2004. Ultimately, high population growth was the main contributor with an estimated per capita GDP decreasing by nearly 50% after dissolution from Australia.

=== Papua New Guinea's Reform by the IMF ===
In 1994, Papua New Guinea entered into talks with the IMF. Although details are scarce, not much resulted from these conversations except the deconstruction of economic and political hardships which the nation was undergoing. However, it was not until July 1995 that Papua New Guinea entered in a standby agreement with the IMF for assistance with balance of payments. Shortly thereafter, another standby agreement was made to include a change in governance, decimate barriers to investment, and more. Eventually, with the support of the IMF, macroeconomic stability reached an acceptable level in 1996.

=== IMF Goals With Papua New Guinea ===
Economic development within Papua New Guinea revolved around four goals: development strategies, external economic relations, role of private sector, and evolution of financial structure. As of February 27, 2022, the IMF reached multiple conclusions during article IV consultations with Papua New Guinea. These included an increase in commodity prices, construction projects, and a new project on liquefying natural gas. As of recently, the IMF approved a $363.6 million dollar loan towards COVID-19 pandemic relief. This includes support for business, workers, and households alike. The goal as of recently is to secure the health of the local Papua New Guinea population.
