= History of Papua New Guinea =

The prehistory of Papua New Guinea can be traced to about 50,000–60,000 years ago, when people first migrated towards the Australian continent. Agriculture was established at least 7000 years ago in the New Guinea Highlands. Extensive trade networks operated throughout the region, and successive waves of migration included the spread of Austronesian languages around 3000 years ago, and the rise of the Lapita culture.

In 1545 the Spanish explorer Yñigo Ortiz de Retez was the first person to give the name "New Guinea" to the main island. European colonisation began in the 1880s when the eastern portion of New Guinea was divided between the German Empire and the British Empire. In WWI, the Allies took control of German New Guinea. After the war ended, the League of Nations gave Australia a mandate to administer the former German territory. In 1949, an Act was passed by the Parliament of Australia to form the administrative union of the Territory of Papua and New Guinea. On 16 September 1975, the Territory gained independence from Australia and became a sovereign state known as the Independent State of Papua New Guinea.

== Archaeology ==
Regions of Oceania: Australasia, Polynesia, Micronesia, and Melanesia. Australasia includes the Australian landmass (including Tasmania), New Zealand, and New Guinea.

Archaeological evidence indicates that humans arrived on New Guinea perhaps 60,000 years ago, although this is under debate. They came probably by sea from Southeast Asia during the Last Glacial Period, when sea levels were lower. Although the first arrivals were hunters and gatherers, early evidence shows that people managed the forest environment to provide food. There also are indications of Neolithic gardening having been practiced at Kuk at the same time that agriculture was developing in Mesopotamia and Egypt. The sweet potatoes and pigs which are agricultural staples today were later arrivals, but shellfish and fish have long been mainstays of coastal dwellers' diets. Recent archaeological research suggests that 50,000 years ago people may have occupied sites in the highlands at altitudes of up to 2,000 m (6,600 ft), rather than being restricted to warmer coastal areas.

Archaeological evidence indicates that anatomically modern humans first arrived in what became New Guinea and Australia, as well as the Bismarck Archipelago, around 42,000 to 45,000 years ago. Bougainville was settled around 28,000 years ago, and the more distant Manus Island by 20,000 years ago. These migrations were part of one of the earliest migrations of humans from Africa, and resulting populations remained relatively isolated from the rest of the world throughout prehistory. Evidence of habitation of the highlands goes back 35,000 years. The climate warmed from around 18,000 years ago, and rising sea levels isolated New Guinea from Australia about 10,000 years ago. However, Aboriginal Australians and New Guineans diverged from each other genetically earlier, about 37,000 years ago. Habitation of the islands increased after the climate changed. Water rose over the Torres Strait around 8,500 years ago. The Bismarck and Solomon archipelagos were never connected to Sahul. The people of New Guinea share 4%–7% of their genome with the Denisovans, indicating that the ancestors of Papuans interbred in Asia with these archaic hominins.

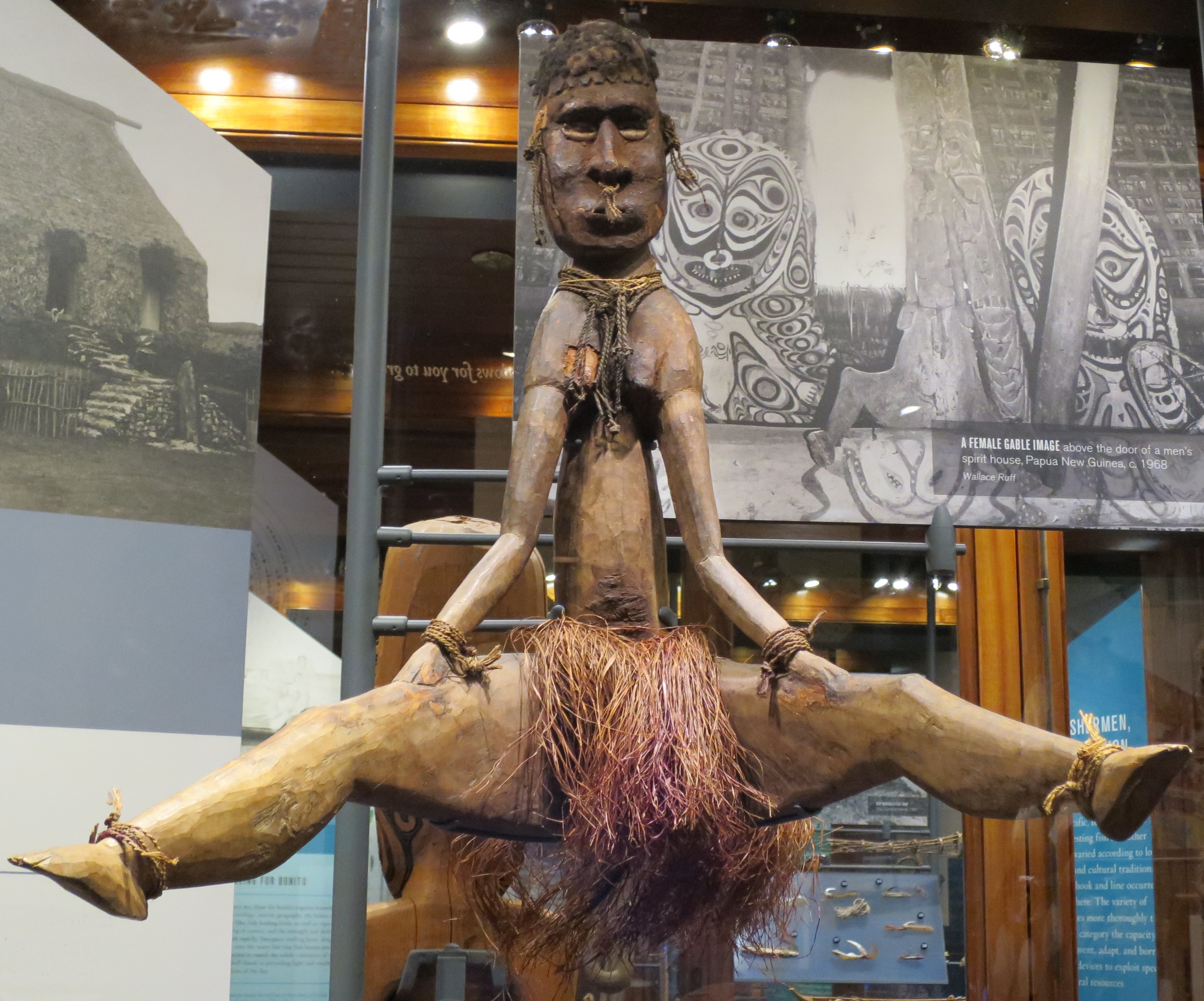
Female gable image, Sawos people, Oceanic art in the Bishop Museum

Stone tools have been found on the Huon Peninsula dating back 40,000 years. Before proper agriculture, some plants had already been domesticated, including sago, Canarium indicum, and karuka. C. indicum was possibly spread by people from the mainland to the islands. Karuka may have originally been domesticated Pandanus brosimos. Taro was eaten long before it was purposefully farmed. Obsidian tools, which could be used for harvesting plants, were traded from at least 23,000 years ago. At some point, cassowary chicks began to be occasionally reared.

Agriculture was independently developed in the New Guinea highlands around 7000 BC, making it one of the few areas in the world where people independently domesticated plants. Significant evidence of this comes from the Kuk Swamp, which has evidence of thousands of years of use to grow crops including taro and bananas.

Archaeological evidence shows that Austronesian-speaking peoples of the Lapita culture reached the Bismarck Archipelago by 3,300 years ago. It is unknown whether they also settled on the mainland at this time, however there is strong evidence of their presence in coastal areas from around 500 BC. These communities interacted with larger trade networks. It is likely through these trading networks that banana and sugarcane moved from New Guinea to other areas of the world. Austronesian migration has been correlated with the introduction of pottery, pigs, chickens, dogs, and certain fishing techniques. Two plant species came from the Pacific: Barringtonia procera likely arrived from the Solomon Islands, while Kava came from Vanuatu.

Trade reduced by around 300 AD, as demand for goods shifted to the Maluku Islands and Timor. After European interest in the region grew in the 16th century, Dutch influence grew over the Sultanate of Tidore. This Sultanate had some influence over islands near New Guinea. Over the centuries, Dutch authorities extended the area they claimed was part of this Sultanate to roughly the current Indonesia–Papua New Guinea border, however limited or nonexistent the Sultan's actual control was. Renewed trade began to spread to the Eastern parts of New Guinea in the late 17th century, driven by demand for goods including dammar gum, sea cucumbers, pearls, copra, shells, and bird-of-paradise feathers.

Although by the late 20th century headhunting and cannibalism had been practically eradicated, in the past they were practised in many parts of the country as part of rituals related to warfare and taking in enemy spirits or powers. In 1901, on Goaribari Island in the Gulf of Papua, missionary Harry Dauncey found 10,000 skulls in the island's long houses, a demonstration of past practices. According to Marianna Torgovnick, writing in 1991, "The most fully documented instances of cannibalism as a social institution come from New Guinea, where head-hunting and ritual cannibalism survived, in certain isolated areas, into the Fifties, Sixties, and Seventies, and still leave traces within certain social groups."

On New Guinea, communities were economically linked through trading networks, however aside from some political alliances each community functioned largely independently, relying on subsistence agriculture. Goods were often traded along established chains, and some villagers would be familiar with and sometimes know the languages of the immediately neighbouring villages (although language by itself was not a marker of political allegiance). Some wider trading networks existed in maritime areas, such as the Kula ring. Other well known trade networks include the Schouten Islands and the mainland, trade across the Vitiaz Strait, and the Hiri trade cycle. While people did not move far along these routes, goods moved long distances through local exchanges, and cultural practices likely diffused along them. Despite these links, the creation of larger political entities under European rule had no precedent, and in many cases brought together communities who had historically antagonistic relationships, or no relationship at all.

== European contact ==
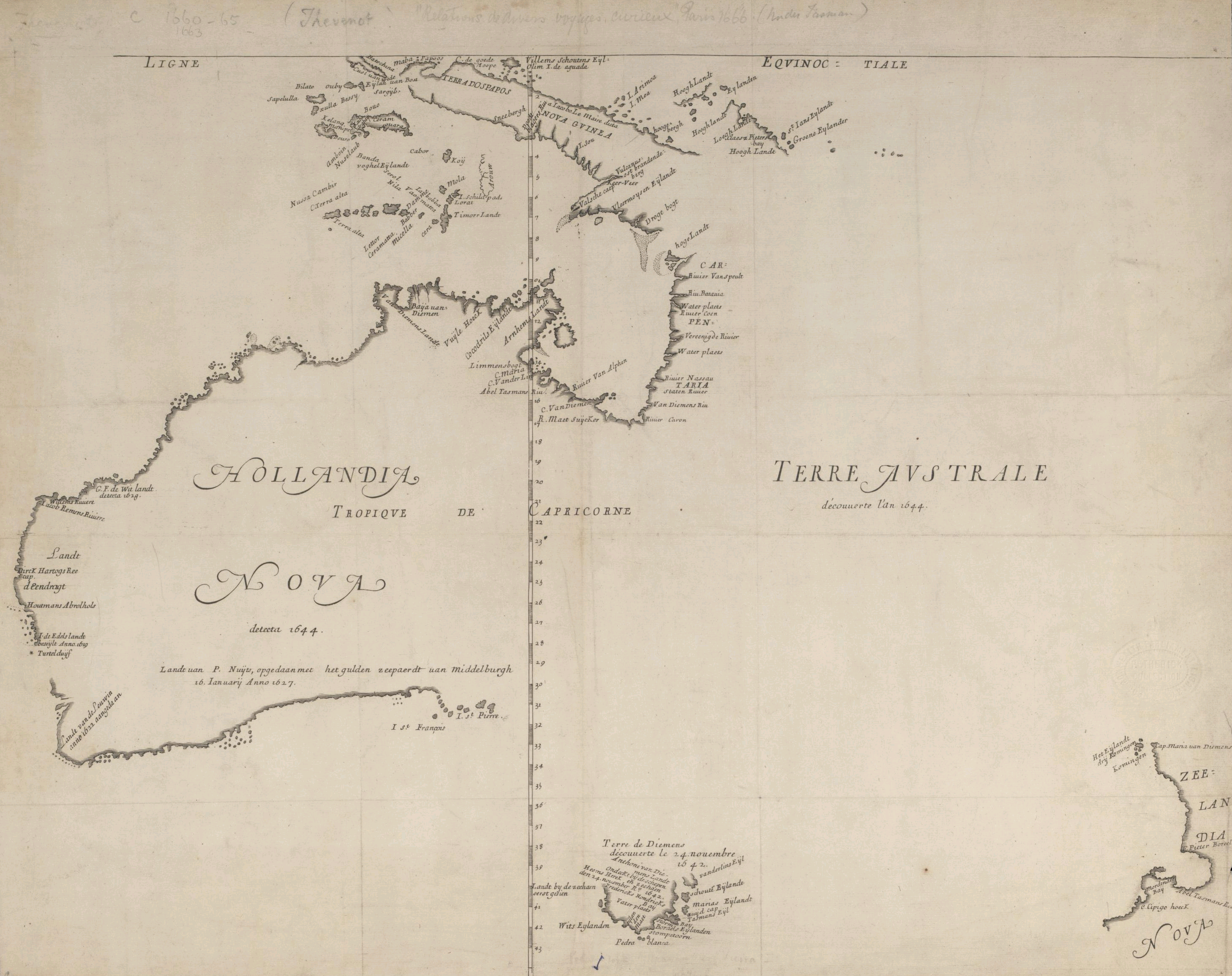
A typical map from the Golden Age of Netherlandish cartography. Australasia during the Golden Age of Dutch exploration and discovery (ca. 1590s–1720s): including Nova Guinea (New Guinea), Nova Hollandia (mainland Australia), Van Diemen's Land (Tasmania), and Nova Zeelandia (New Zealand).

It is likely that some ships from China and Southeast Asia visited the island at times, and that there was some contact with New Guinean communities. The Portuguese explorer António de Abreu was the first European to discover the island of New Guinea, encountering the north coast, and in 1526 his countryman Jorge de Menezes discovered the west coast. The first Spanish explorer to see the island was Álvaro de Saavedra Cerón in 1528. Portuguese traders introduced the South American sweet potato to the Moluccas. From there, it likely spread into what is today Papua New Guinea sometime in the 17th or 18th century, initially from the southern coast. It soon spread inland to the highlands, and became a staple food. The introduction of the sweet potato, possibly alongside other agricultural changes, transformed traditional agriculture and societies and likely led to the spread of the Big man social structure. Sweet potato largely supplanted the previous staple, taro, and resulted in a significant increase in population in the highlands. They allowed for cultivation at higher altitudes, and for a larger number of pigs to be raised. The date of the sweet potato's arrival is still disputed. It did not spread to all communities, with some still relying on taro and yam. Also from the Americas, Tobacco was similarly introduced around this time, with the first written evidence showing it was present in 1616. Lima beans were likely introduced in the 1700s or 1800s. Bixa orellana followed some time before 1870. In total, over 170 native and introduced plant species are known to have been used for food in some way before permanent European contact, with the core plants being taro, banana, sago, and yam.

When Europeans first arrived, inhabitants of New Guinea and nearby islands, whose technologies included bone, wood, and stone tools, had a productive agricultural system. They traded along the coast (mainly in pottery, shell ornaments and foodstuffs) and in the interior (exchanging forest products for shells and other sea products).

The first known Europeans to sight New Guinea were probably Portuguese and Spanish navigators sailing in the South Pacific in the early part of the 16th century. In 1526–1527 the Portuguese explorer Jorge de Menezes accidentally came upon the principal island.

Papua is derived from a local term of uncertain origin, that may have already been used locally to refer to at least parts of the island now called New Guinea. In 1526 Portuguese explorer Jorge de Menezes named the island Ilhas dos Papuas. The word "Papua" has applied to various areas of New Guinea since then, with its inclusion in "Papua New Guinea" coming from its use for the Territory of Papua.

Papua may be from a Malay word for the frizzled quality of Melanesian people's hair.

Regarding the islands of New Guinea, the Portuguese captain and geographer António Galvão wrote that:

The people of all these islands are blacke, and have their haire frisled, whom the people of Maluco do call Papuas.

"New Guinea" (Nueva Guinea) was the name coined by the Spanish explorer Yñigo Ortiz de Retez. In 1545, he noted the resemblance of the people to those he had earlier seen along the Guinea coast of Africa. Guinea, in its turn, is etymologically derived from the Portuguese word Guiné. The name is one of several toponyms sharing similar etymologies, which likely means "of the burnt face" or similar, in reference to the dark skin of the inhabitants. Its use in the country name comes from German New Guinea, later the Territory of New Guinea, which was united with the territory of Papua.

Although European navigators visited the islands and explored their coastlines thereafter, European researchers knew little of the inhabitants until the 1870s, when Russian anthropologist Nicholai Miklukho-Maklai made a number of expeditions to New Guinea, spent several years living among native tribes, and described their way of life in a comprehensive treatise.

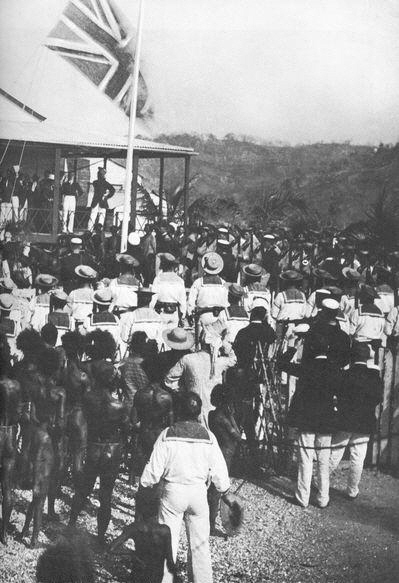
British flag raised after Queensland declared it was annexing part of the island in 1883

By the 1800s, there was some trade with the Dutch East Indies. Beginning in the 1860s, people from New Guinea were effectively taken as slaves to Queensland and Fiji as part of the blackbirding trade. This was stopped in 1884. Most of those taken were from coastal Papua. Those who returned to New Guinea brought their interactions with the west with them, but the largest impact was the creation of what became the Tok Pisin language. French Explorer Louis Antoine de Bougainville sailed through what is now the Autonomous Region of Bougainville in the late 1760s. Russian anthropologist Nicholas Miklouho-Maclay lived in New Guinea for a few years in the 1870s.

Christianity was introduced to New Guinea on 15 September 1847 when a group of French Marist missionaries came to Woodlark Island. They established their first mission on Umboi Island. Following that year, they were forced to withdraw their mission endeavour. Five years later on 8 October 1852, the Pontifical Institute for Foreign Missions, a pontifical institute, reestablished the mission on Woodlark Island, encountering sickness and resistance from local people. The location of this mission came following the advice of whalers who knew the area. For both parts of the island, missions were the primary source of western culture as well as religion. Missionary work in Papua started in the 1870s. The largest group was the London Missionary Society, which began in 1873 and included Polynesian missionaries. From this time until the First World War, 327 missionaries are recorded as working in Papua. In the same year, a Methodist mission opened in the Duke of York Islands. In 1886, a Lutheran mission opened in what is now the Finschhafen District. The Catholic Society of the Divine Word founded a mission in New Guinea 1896.

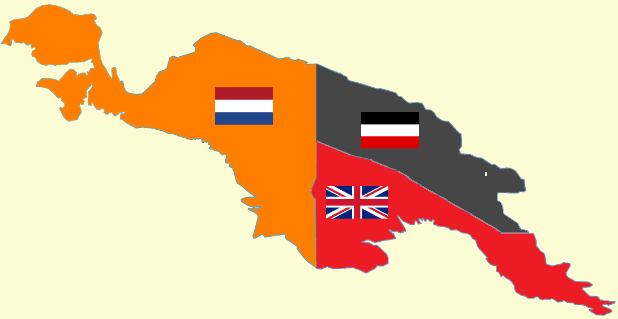
New Guinea from 1884 to 1919. Germany and Britain controlled the eastern half of New Guinea.

The British East India Company attempted to annex part of the island in 1793, but this was not approved by the British government. The western half of the island was annexed by the Netherlands in 1848. Information about the east initially came from whalers hunting off the island and anchoring at the Duke of York Islands, as well as traders passing through.

Successful and long-term European settlement began in the 1870s. The Russian Nikolai Miklouho-Maclay and lived in the Rai Coast District for a few years from 1871, introducing crops which have retained Russian-derived names in local languages. The London Missionary Society set up missions on the south coast in 1872, while a trading port was established on the Duke of York Islands. The company of the German trader Johann Cesar VI. Godeffroy established a presence at Blanche Bay in 1873. On 24 April 1873, British Captain John Moresby aboard HMS Basilisk raised the Union Flag on Hayter Island near Milne Bay and claimed it for the United Kingdom. However, this was not viewed favourably by the British government. The Duke of York Islands saw the arrival of Methodist missionaries in 1875.

The nearby Torres Strait Islands were annexed by Queensland in 1878, amid rising commercial interest in New Guinea, and the border moved further north in 1879. Queensland and other Australian states did not wish for Germany to claim the remained of New Guinea. Queensland attempted to annex the area in 1883, driven by the Governor of the Torres Strait Islands, although this was deemed unlawful. Negotiations with the United Kingdom saw the various British colonies in the region agree to pay for any administrative costs. The rejection of Queensland's unilateral action by the United Kingdom led to the 1883 Intercolonial Convention, accelerating the federation of Australia due to the desire of the Pacific colonies to have more autonomy.

The eastern half of the island was divided between two colonial powers in 1884. Germany declared a protectorate over the northern portion as German New Guinea before annexing it the next year, while the southern part of the island became the protectorate of British New Guinea. The border between the two was agreed in 1885, while border between British and Dutch was altered slightly in 1895.

== Territory of Papua ==
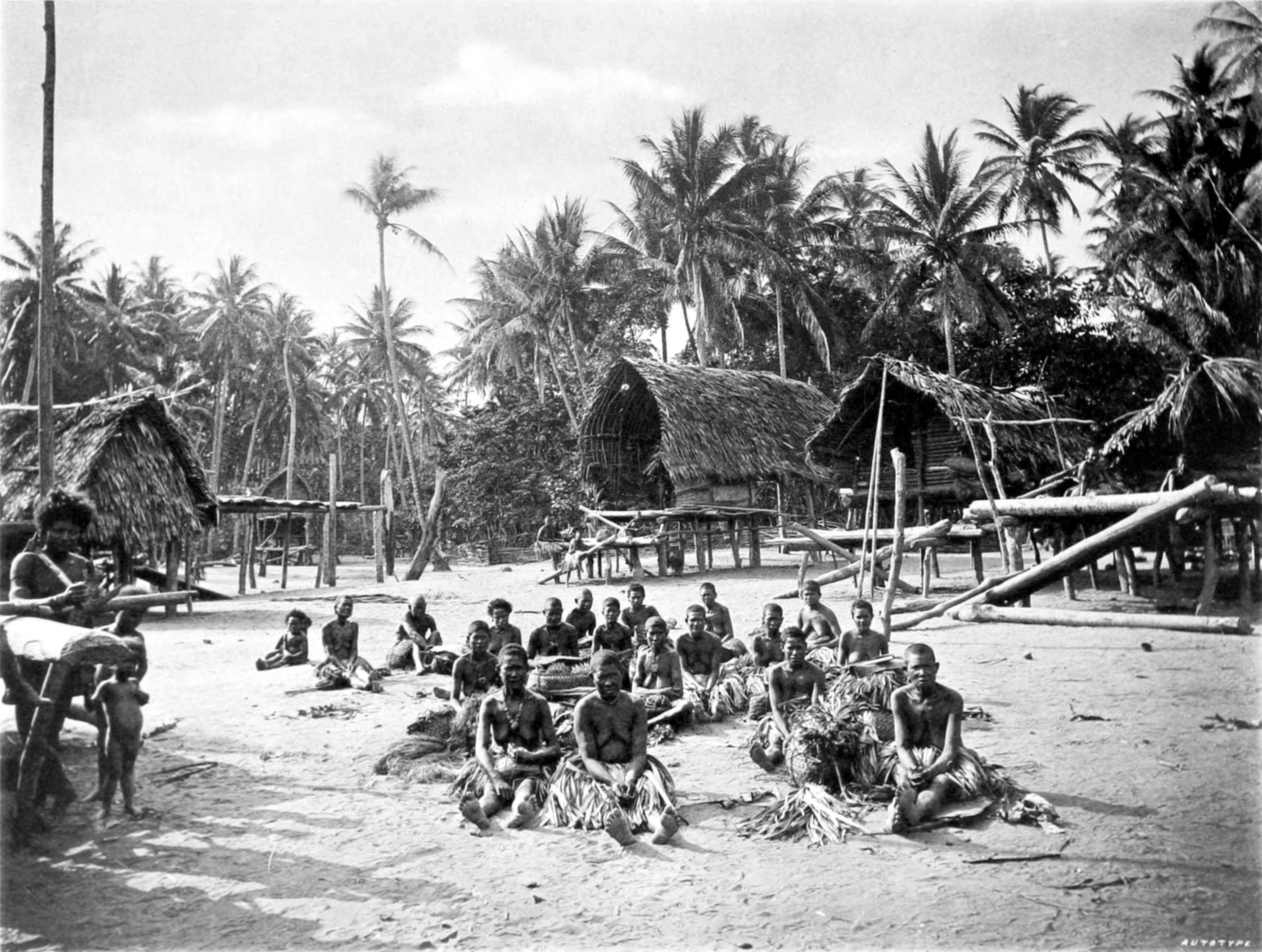
Kerepunu women at the marketplace of Kalo, British New Guinea, 1885

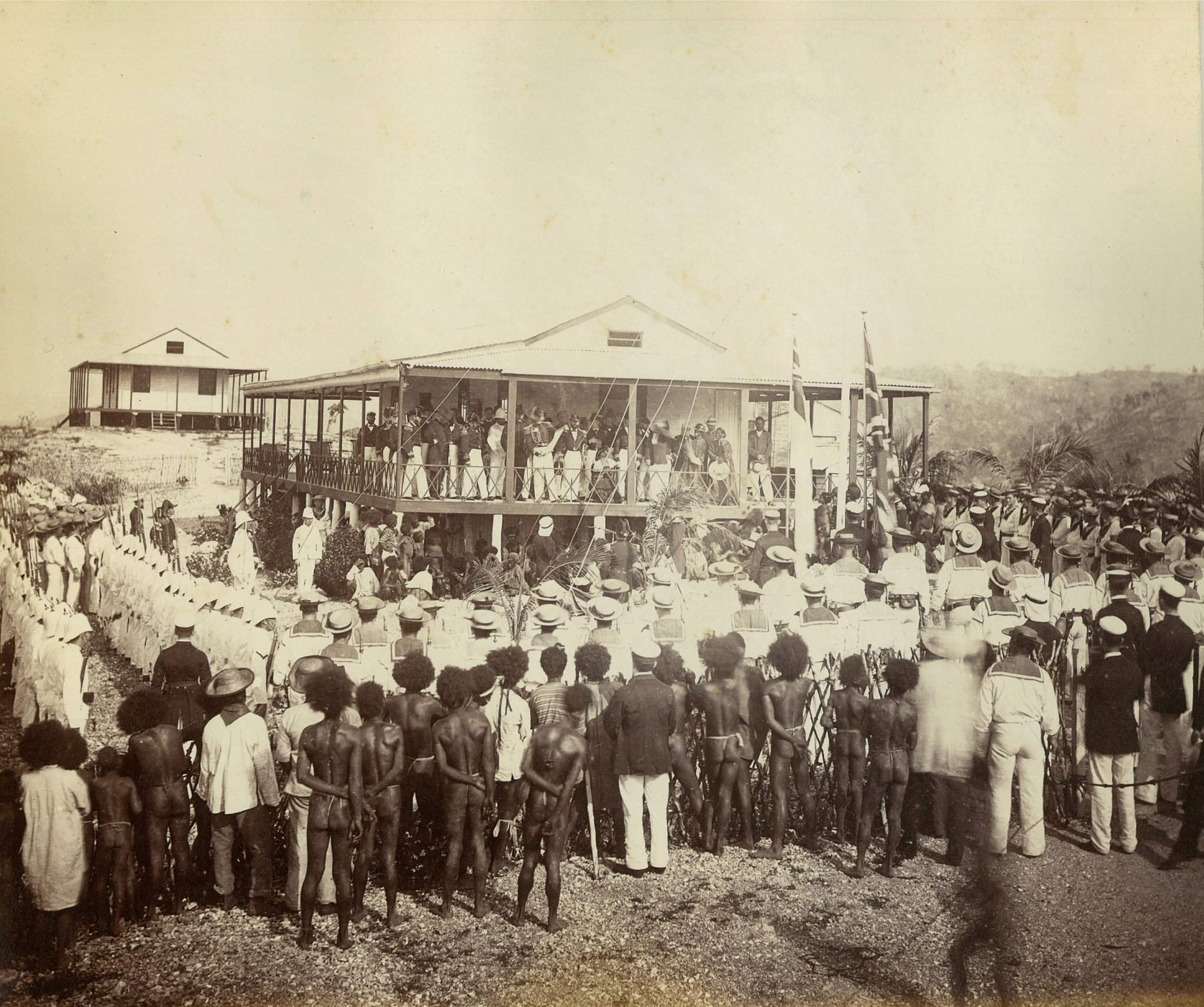
British annexation of southeast New Guinea in 1884

In 1883, the Colony of Queensland tried to annex the southern half of eastern New Guinea, but the British government did not approve. However, when Germany began settlements in the north a British protectorate was proclaimed in 1884 over the southern coast of New Guinea and its adjacent islands. The protectorate, called British New Guinea, was annexed outright on 4 September 1888. The possession was placed under the authority of the Commonwealth of Australia in 1902. Following the passage of the Papua Act in 1905, British New Guinea became the Territory of Papua, and formal Australian administration began in 1906 lasting until the independence of Papua New Guinea in 1975.

In the British area, gold was found near the Mambare River in 1895.

In 1902, Papua was effectively transferred to the authority of the newly federated British dominion of Australia. With the passage of the Papua Act 1905, the area was officially renamed the Territory of Papua, and the Australian administration became formal in 1906, with Papua becoming fully annexed as an Australian territory. 1888 also saw the Ritter Island eruption, which sent large tsunamis towards the mainland.

There was little economic activity in Papua. Australia administered it separately under the Papua Act until it was invaded by the Empire of Japan in 1941, and civil administration suspended. During the Pacific War, Papua was governed by an Australian military administration from Port Moresby, where General Douglas MacArthur occasionally made his headquarters.

In 1908 the trade of birds-of-paradise was banned in Papua due to fears for the species' extinction.

Flag under German control of New Guinea.

== German New Guinea ==
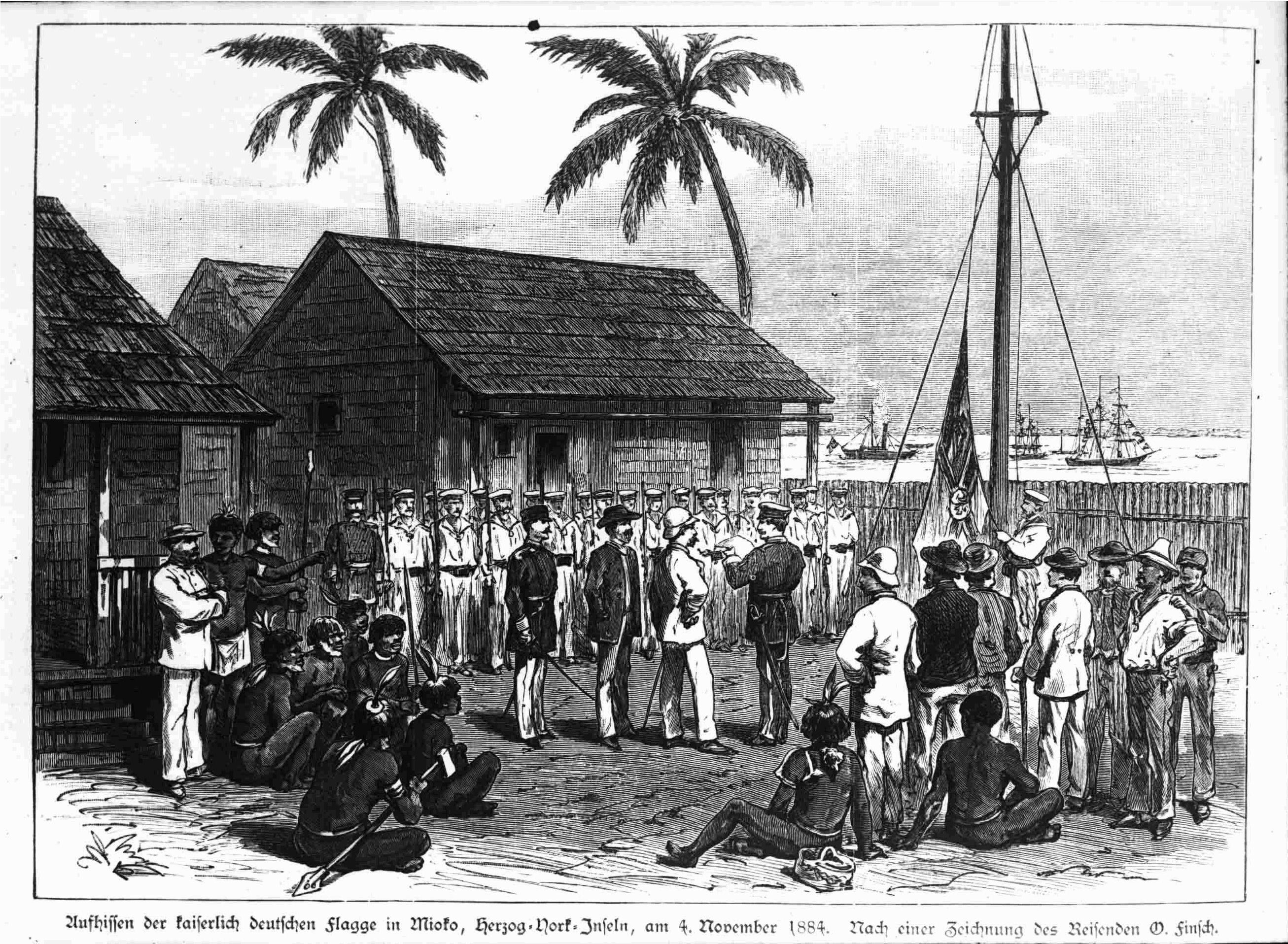
Hoisting the German flag at Mioko in 1884

With Europe's growing desire for coconut oil, Godeffroy's of Hamburg, the largest trading firm in the Pacific, began trading for copra in the New Guinea Islands. In 1884, the German Empire formally took possession of the northeast quarter of the island and put its administration in the hands of a chartered trading company formed for the purpose, the German New Guinea Company. In the charter granted to this company by the German Imperial Government in May 1885, it was given the power to exercise sovereign rights over the territory and other "unoccupied" lands in the name of the government, and the ability to "negotiate" directly with the native inhabitants. Relationships with foreign powers were retained as the preserve of the German government. The Neu Guinea Kompanie paid for the local governmental institutions directly, in return for the concessions which had been awarded to it. In 1899, the German imperial government assumed direct control of the territory, thereafter known as German New Guinea.

While the German administration was at first run by a commercial company, by 1889 the German government had direct control. The German New Guinea Company had initially tried to develop plantations, but when this was not successful began to engage in barter trade. Trading posts were established in 1897, and German authorities soon banned other traders from accessing the region to try and restrict competition. Where trade continued inland, the use of established trade routes meant traders were safe from attacks. This clandestine internal cross-border trade continued until at least the 1930s. In the British area, gold was found near the Mambare River in 1895.

New Guinea was basically a business venture. Thousands of local workers were hired as cheap labor on cocoa and copra plantations. In 1899, the German government took control of the colony from the New Guinea company of Berlin. Education was in the hands of missionaries. In 1914 when the First World War broke out Australia seized the German colony. The plantations were given to Australian war veterans and in 1921 the League of Nations gave Australia a trusteeship over New Guinea. The plantations and gold mining generated a degree of prosperity.

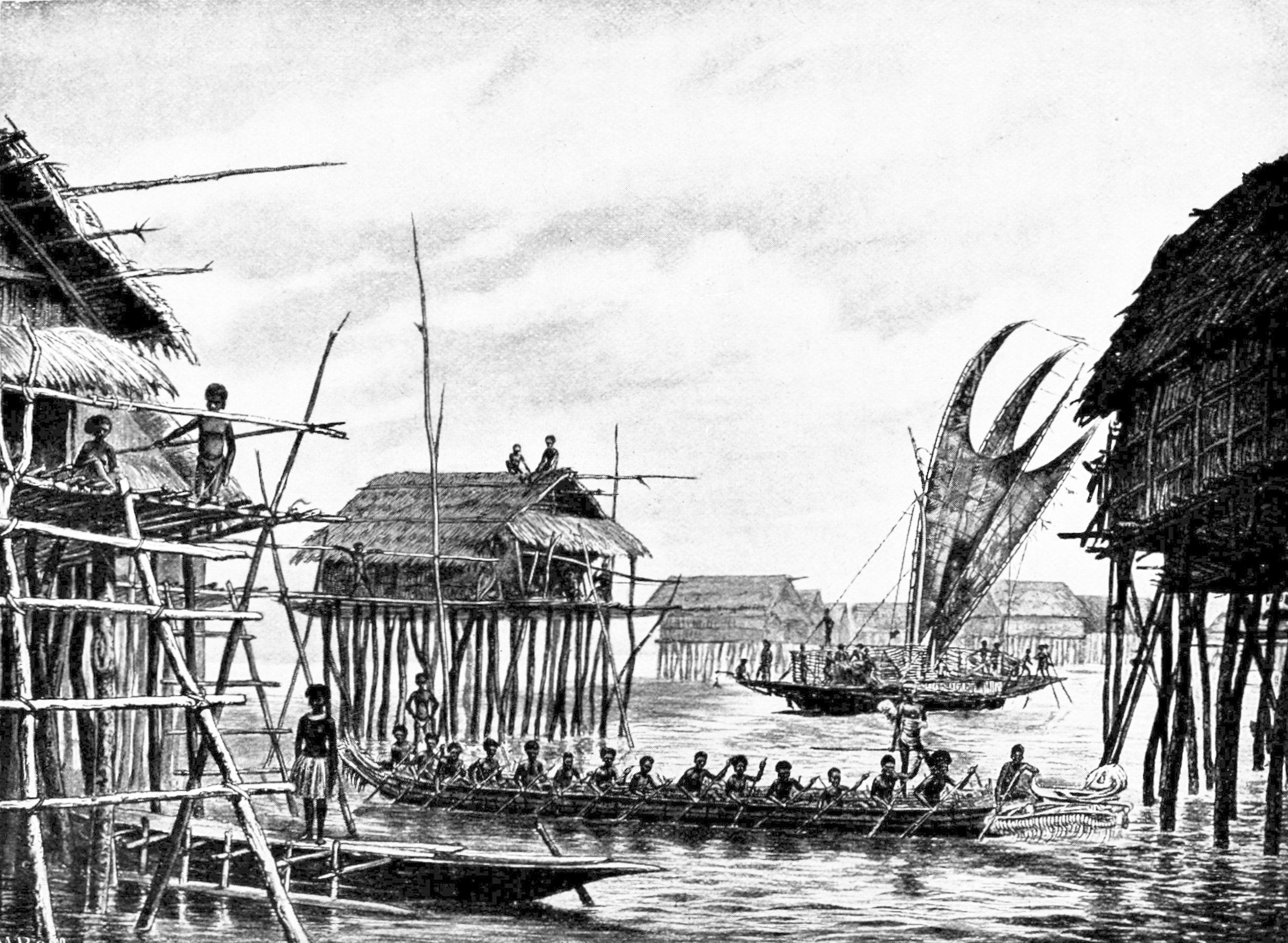
Papuan lake dwellings with a lakatoi under sail, 1898 or before

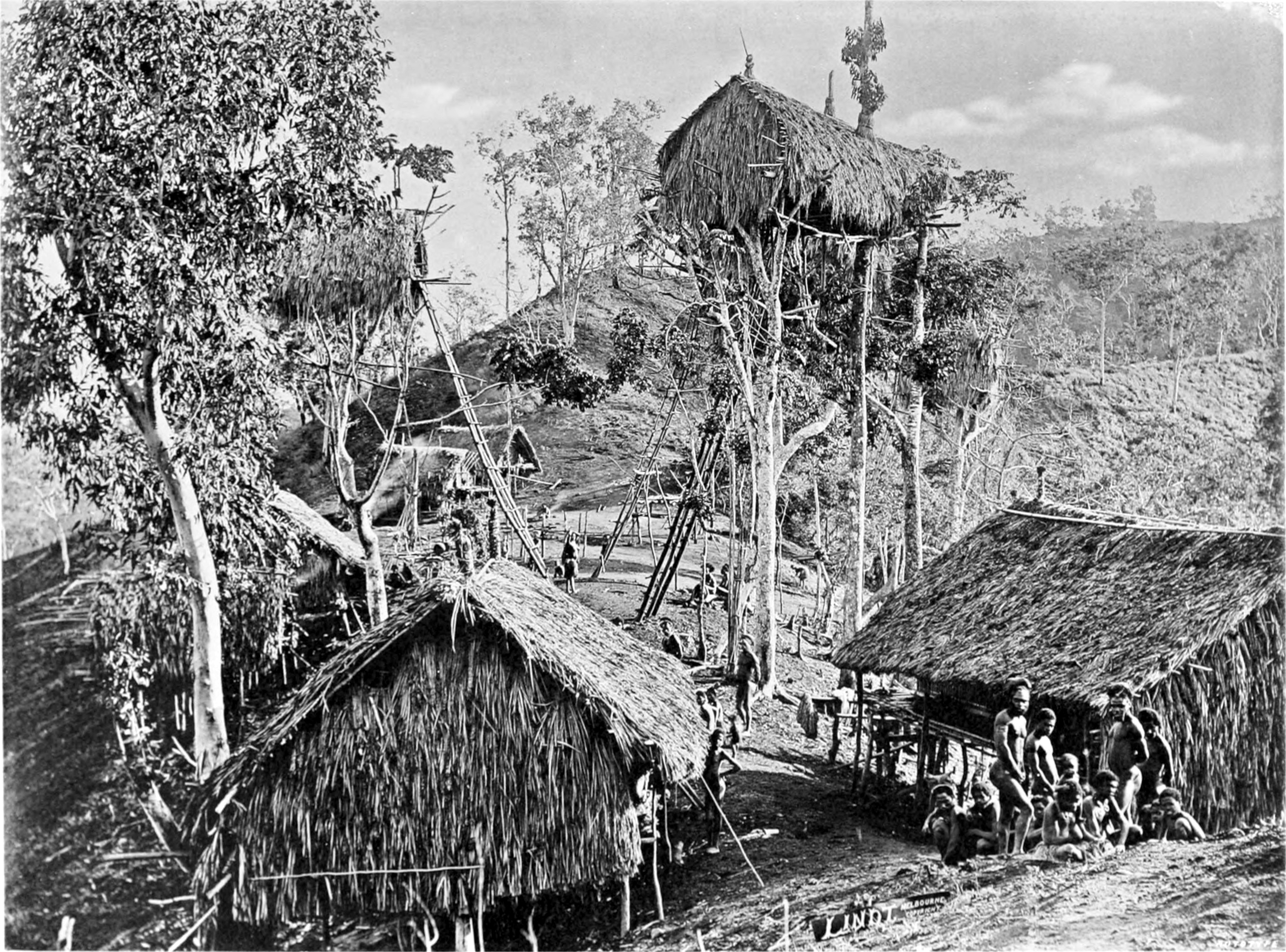
Koiari village near Bootless Inlet, British New Guinea

New Guinea first placed limitations on the birds-of-paradise trade, before banning it for one year in 1914. The ban on trade became permanent in 1922 under Australian rule.

== Social and political changes ==
Under European rule, social relations amongst the New Guinean population changed. Tribal fighting decreased, while in new urban areas there was greater mixing as people moved to partake in the cash crop economy. The large inequality between colonial administrators and locals led to the emergence of what colonial governments called cargo cults. Very little land was changed, with most plantations limited to the islands and small areas of the mainland coast. However, a trading system developed with Melanesian populations exchanging copra, pearls, trochus shells, and bird-of-paradise skins. One of the most significant impacts of colonial rule was to changes in local travel. Colonial authorities outlawed tribal warfare, and it became normal to move for work, while roads increased the connectivity between inland areas.

Colonial authorities generally worked with individual village representatives, although in some cases an individual represented a group of villages. While these were sometimes village leaders, they were usually individuals with closer relationships to colonial officials who thus acted as intermediaries. Thus, neither German nor British authorities developed an effective system of indirect rule. In German New Guinea, Tok Pisin, an already existing pidgin language, began to spread through local adoption, and was reluctantly used by German authorities. Missionaries used a mixture of Tok Pisin and local languages, and such local languages were often individually specific to each mission station. In areas under British and then Australian governance, a simplified version of English emerged as an early lingua franca, although authorities soon adopted Hiri Motu, a pidgin version of the Motu language that was already in use around Port Moresby. Hiri Motu quickly became established as a de facto official language, preferable to pidgin English. Nonetheless, formal English was taught in the educational system.

== Territory of New Guinea ==
A map of British and German New Guinea before the First World War, with a stamp noting it was lent to the Paris Peace Conference following the war

Following the outbreak of World War I in 1914, Australian forces captured German New Guinea and occupied it throughout the war. Following international law, Australian mostly maintained existing legislation during this period of formal military occupation. After the end of the war, the League of Nations authorised Australia to administer this area as a Class "C" League of Nations mandate territory from 9 May 1921, which became the Territory of New Guinea. The Territory of Papua and the new Mandate of New Guinea were administered separately.

The Commonwealth of Australia assumed a mandate from the League of Nations for governing the former German territory of New Guinea in 1920. It was administered under this mandate until the Japanese invasion in December 1941 brought about the suspension of Australian civil administration. Much of the Territory of New Guinea, including the islands of Bougainville and New Britain, was occupied by Japanese forces before being recaptured by Australian and American forces during the final months of the war (see New Guinea campaign).

In contrast to establishing an Australian mandate in former German New Guinea, the League of Nations determined that Papua was an external territory of the Australian Commonwealth; as a matter of law it remained a British possession. The difference in legal status meant that until 1949, Papua (former British protectorate Territory of Papua) and New Guinea (former German territory German New Guinea) had entirely separate administrations, both controlled by Australia. These conditions contributed to the complexity of organising the country's post-independence legal system.

More plantations were established along the coast and on the islands following the war, and a head tax was imposed that caused further participation in the colonial economy. Gold was discovered in the 1920s, and within a decade became the largest export. When Australian authorities took charge of German New Guinea's administration in 1921, they continued the practice of using Tok Pisin. While English was established as the official language of both territories, Tok Pisin remained the lingua franca of administration in the north, while Hiri Motu remained the lingua franca of the south. Tok Pisin became more widely spoken, while the use Hiri Motu remained mostly restricted to areas near Port Moresby.

Gold was discovered in Bulolo in the 1920s, and prospectors searched other areas of the island. The highland valleys were explored by prospectors in the 1930s and were found to be inhabited by over a million people.

== Exploration of Mandated Territory of New Guinea ==
=== Akmana Expedition 1929–1930 ===
The exploration of Papua–New Guinea has been a continuing process. As of October 2017 new groups of people occasionally are still contacted. Not until recent years has New Guinea's exploration been planned; much of it has been the work of miners, labour recruiters, missionaries, adventurers, with different objectives in mind. Many of these people have been doers, not recorders of facts, with the result that our knowledge of the territory's exploration has not kept pace with the exploration itself.

An exception is the record of the Akmana Gold Prospecting Company's Field Party which carried out two expeditions from September to December 1929 and from mid February to the end of June 1930. They journeyed on the "Banyandah", a cruiser of 12 metres (38 ft) from Madang up the coast to the mouth of the Sepik River, travelling along that river to Marienberg and Moim, then along the Karosameri River to the Karrawaddi River and on to the Arrabundio River and Yemas, after which it was necessary to transport their stores and equipment by pinnace, canoe and ultimately on foot to their Mountain Base on the upper Arrabundio River.

During their first expedition the Akmana Field Party prospected the tributaries of the Arrabundio and then trekked across a spur of the Central Mountain Range to sample the Upper Karrawaddi River. Retracing their steps to the Arrabundio they then headed out across another spur of the Central Mountain Range to the Junction of the Yuat River with the Jimmi and Baiyer Rivers, again without finding gold in sufficient quantity. Returning to Madang at the end of December 1929, several of the party went back to Sydney to obtain instructions from the Akmana Gold Prospecting Company.

In mid February 1930 the second expedition quickly returned to their Mountain Base and on across the mountains to the junction of the Yuat with the Baiyer and Jimmi Rivers. They prospected south along the Baiyer River to its junction with the Maramuni and Tarua Rivers, where they established a palisaded forward camp naming the place 'Akmana Junction.' From this base they prospected along the Maramuni River and its tributaries, again without success. Finally they prospected the Tarua River south past the tributary which flows to Waipai, once more without success and on the advice of mining engineer Seale, it was decided there was nothing to justify further exploration. They had not progressed to any country on the southern watershed through which the early explorers and prospectors travelled to the Hagan Range and Wabag. The party returned to Madang, sailing for Sydney on 3 July 1930.

After leading the first expedition, Sam Freeman did not return and Reg Beazley became party leader of the second expedition, with Pontey Seale mining engineer, Bill MacGregor and Beazley prospectors and recruiters, and Ernie Shepherd in charge of transport and supplies, prospecting when opportunity arose. They had all served overseas during World War I with the AIF on the western front, in Egypt and the Levant and had previously been to New Guinea. In 1926 Freeman was near Marienberg with Ormildah drilling for oil; Shepherd was with Dr. Wade and R.J. Winters on their geological survey of an oil lease of 26,000 square kilometres (10,000 sq mi) in the Bogia and Nubio to Ramu region and up the Sepik River to Kubka 100 km (60 mi) above Ambunto. Beazley was drilling test sites for oil with Matahower in the lower Sepik and he and McGregor recruited labour on the Sepik and explored grass country to Wee Wak. Beazley also prospected the Arrabundio for gold and on his promising report to Freeman, Akmana Gold Prospecting Coy was floated in 1928.

The Akmana Gold Prospecting Field Party made contact with many peoples they called: grass country people, head hunters, pygmies, wig–men, Kanakas, Poomani. These contacts were often with the help of Drybow/Dribu, a leader and spokesman of the wig–men, a most intelligent man of goodwill, with a quiet authority that brought forth friendly cooperation. 'We made a peaceful entry into this new country, establishing a reputation for fair trade and decent behaviour ... but gold was our interest and we had traced the rivers and tributaries as far as practicable where conditions and results justified the effort and found nothing worthwhile. In the many years since, there have been quite a few reports of prospecting parties in the area. But nothing of note has been reported: So we did not leave much behind, it seems.'

'Members of the Akmana party donated wigs they had brought back to various museums. Two of them went to The Australian Museum, Sydney (from Beazley and Shepherd). Current records at the Australian Museum show that Beazley's wig, described as "a cap composed of human hair from the headwaters of the U–at River, Central Mountains, Mandated Territory of NG", was lodged on 31 January 1930, presumably on his quick visit to Sydney after the first expedition. Shepherd presented another wig to Father Kirschbaum, who wanted to send it to Germany. The wigs at The Australian Museum were later confused with some brought out of the Highlands 10 years afterwards by Jim Taylor during his Hagen–Sepik patrol, and wrongly attributed to him when put on display. Seale presented two wigs to the National Museum Canberra in 1930.'

== World War II ==
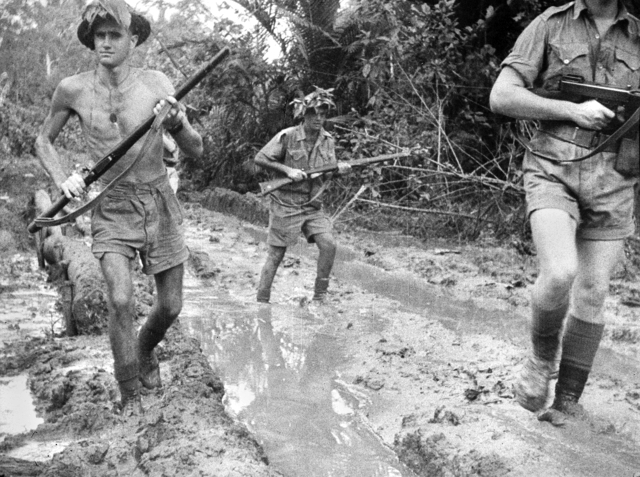
Australian troops at Milne Bay, Papua.The Australian garrison was the first to inflict defeat on the Imperial Japanese Army during World War II at the Battle of Milne Bay of Aug–Sep 1942.

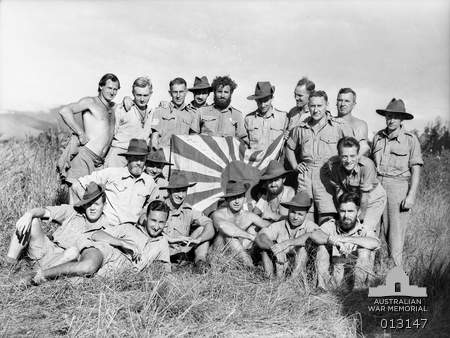
New Guinea Volunteer Rifles with captured Japanese flag, 1942

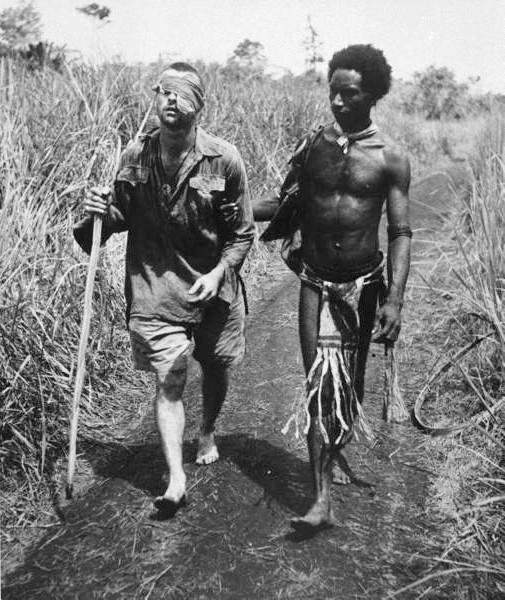
An Australian soldier, Private George "Dick" Whittington, is aided by Papuan orderly Raphael Oimbari, near Buna on 25 December 1942.

Shortly after the start of the Pacific War, the island of New Guinea was invaded by the Japanese. Most of West Papua, at that time known as Dutch New Guinea, was occupied, as were large parts of the Territory of New Guinea (the former German New Guinea, which was also under Australian rule after World War I), but Papua was protected to a large extent by its southern location and the near-impassable Owen Stanley Ranges to the north.

The New Guinea campaign opened with the battles for New Britain and New Ireland in the Territory of New Guinea in 1942. Rabaul, the capital of the Territory was overwhelmed on 22–23 January and was established as a major Japanese base from whence they landed on mainland New Guinea and advanced towards Port Moresby and Australia. Having had their initial effort to capture Port Moresby by a seaborne invasion disrupted by the U.S. Navy in the Battle of the Coral Sea, the Japanese attempted a landward invasion from the north via the Kokoda Trail. From July 1942, a few Australian reserve battalions, many of them very young and untrained, fought a stubborn rearguard action against a Japanese advance along the Kokoda Track, towards Port Moresby, over the rugged Owen Stanley Ranges. Local Papuans, called Fuzzy Wuzzy Angels by the Australians, assisted and escorted injured Australian troops down the Kokoda trail. The militia, worn out and severely depleted by casualties, were relieved in late August by regular troops from the Second Australian Imperial Force, returning from action in the Mediterranean theatre.

The Japanese were driven back. The bitter Battle of Buna-Gona followed in which Australian and United States forces attacked the main Japanese beachheads in New Guinea, at Buna, Sanananda and Gona. Facing tropical disease, difficult terrain and well constructed Japanese defences, the allies only secured victory with heavy casualties.

In early September 1942 Japanese marines attacked a strategic Royal Australian Air Force base at Milne Bay, near the eastern tip of Papua. They were beaten back by the Australian Army, and the Battle of Milne Bay is remembered as the first outright defeat on Japanese land forces during World War II. The offensives in Papua and New Guinea of 1943–44 were the single largest series of connected operations ever mounted by the Australian armed forces. The Supreme Commander of operations was the United States General Douglas MacArthur, with Australian General Thomas Blamey taking a direct role in planning and operations being essentially directed by staff at New Guinea Force headquarters in Port Moresby. Bitter fighting continued in New Guinea between the largely Australian force and the Japanese 18th Army based in New Guinea until the Japanese surrender in 1945.

The New Guinea campaign was a major campaign of the Pacific War. In all, some 200,000 Japanese soldiers, sailors and airmen died during the campaign against approximately 7,000 Australian and 7,000 American service personnel.

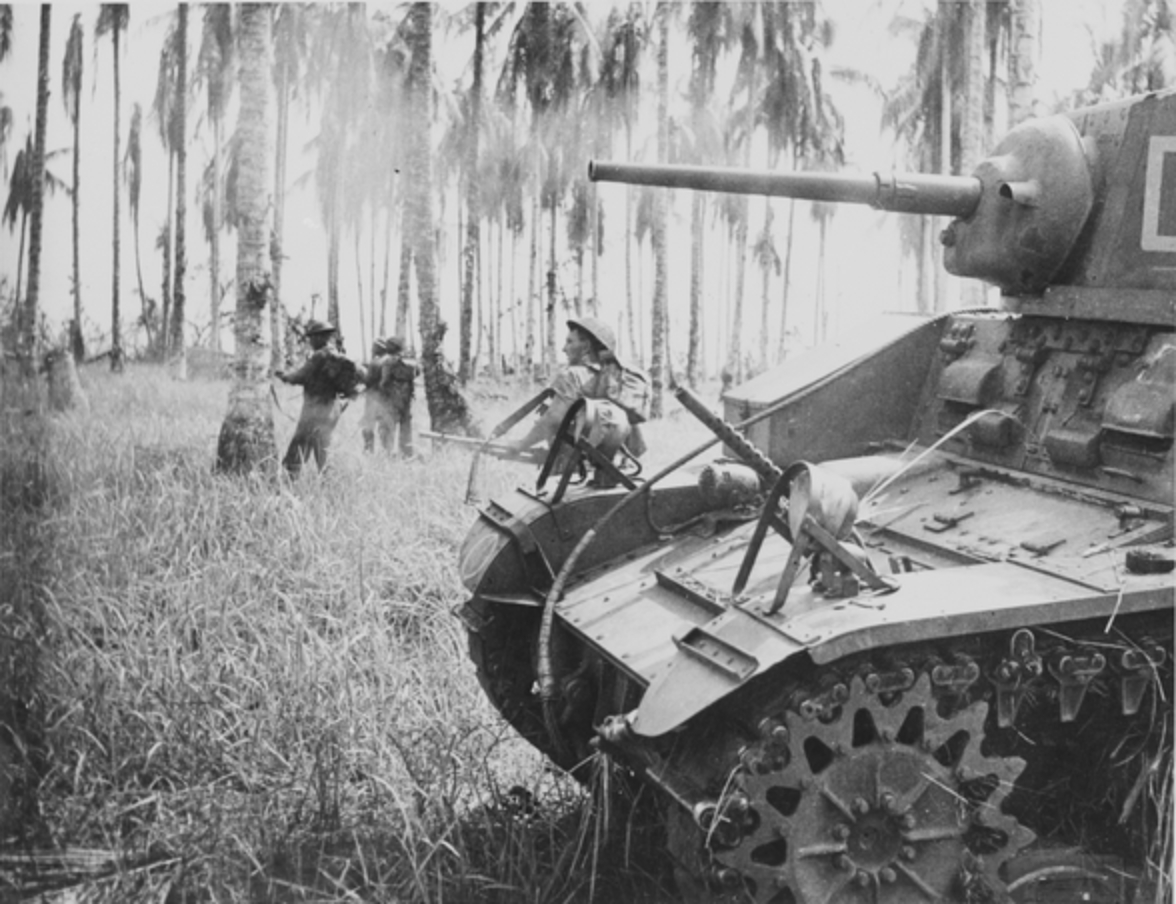
Australian forces attack Japanese positions during the Battle of Buna–Gona, 7 January 1943.

During World War II, the New Guinea campaign (1942–1945) was fought in both the mainland and offshore islands. Approximately 216,000 Japanese, Australian, and U.S. servicemen died. The ground war which saw Japanese forces advance almost to Port Moresby involved significant contributions form native soldiers. Civil government of both territories was suspended during the war, being replaced by a joint military government.

The Second World War punctured the myth of differences between locals and foreigners, and increased the exposure of the population to the wider world and modern social and economic ideas. It also led to significant population movements, beginning the establishment of a common identity shared by those in the two Australian-ruled territories. Both Tok Pisin and Hiri Motu became more common to facilitate communication, and were used for radio broadcasts. The war was the first time Tok Pisin became widely spread in Papua. The joint governance of both territories that was established during the war was continued after the war ended, with the Papua New Guinea Provisional Administration Act of 1945 making this official policy.

== Territory of Papua and New Guinea ==
Following the surrender of the Japanese in 1945, civil administration of Papua as well as New Guinea was restored, and under the Papua New Guinea Provisional Administration Act, (1945–46), Papua and New Guinea were combined in an administrative union.

The Papua and New Guinea Act 1949 formally approved the placing of New Guinea under the international trusteeship system and confirmed the administrative union under the title of The Territory of Papua and New Guinea. The Act provided for a Legislative Council (established in 1951), a judicial organization, a public service, and a system of local government, with Jack Keith Murray continuing as administrator until 1952, when he was succeeded by Donald Cleland. Cleland remained in the position until his retirement in 1967, and lived in Port Moresby until his death in 1975. The House of Assembly of Papua and New Guinea replaced the Legislative Council in 1963, and after elections on 15 February, opened on 8 June 1964. In 1971, the name of the territory was changed to Papua New Guinea. Australia's change of policy towards Papua New Guinea largely commenced with the invitation from the Australian Government to the World Bank to send a mission to the Territory to advise on measures to be taken towards its economic development and political preparation. The mission's report, The Economic Development of the Territory of Papua New Guinea, published in 1964, set out the framework upon which much of later economic policy, up to and beyond independence, proceeded.

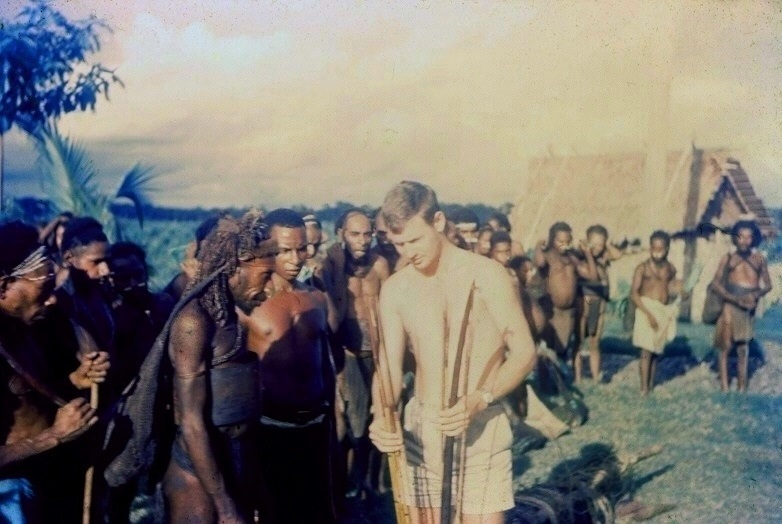
Australian patrol officer in 1964

In 1946, New Guinea was declared a United Nations trust territory under Australian governance. In 1949 Papuans became Australian citizens, and Australia formally combined Papua and New Guinea into the Territory of Papua and New Guinea. However, this did not change the official status of the northern area as a United Nations trust territory.

Village councils were first created in both Papua and in New Guinea starting 1949, with the number steadily increasing over the years. These created alternative power structures, which while sometimes filled by traditional leaders, saw the beginning of a shift towards leaders with administrative or business experience. By 1951, a 28-member Legislative Council was instituted. This was largely dominated by Australian administrative members, with only 3 seats allocated to Papua New Guineans. Jack Keith Murray, an Australian soldier, became the first administrator of this new council. Speeches in the council could be in English, Tok Pisin, or Hiri Motu. A nationwide local government conference was held in 1959, and regional conferences were held afterwards.

The Australian government officially sought to shift post-war economic development more towards the benefit of the local population. Most development was agricultural, with an expansion of smallholding and a focus on facilitating exports. While clear economic objectives emerged, political aims less certain, with independence and becoming an Australian state both seen as possible futures. The 1960s and 1970s saw significant social changes as more of the population began to participate in the formal economy, leading to the development of a more local bureaucracy. Alongside this, Australian administrators promoted a shared national identity. Efforts began in the 1950s to move education, including in mission schools, away from local vernaculars towards English. English was seen by Australian authorities as a potential unifying language, and by many Papua New Guineans as a prestige language. However, growing national identity saw a desire to move back towards local languages, and in the 1970s local languages were re-added to the national syllabus as a supplement to English education. The national philosophy that developed among political leaders, "The Melanesian Way", advocated for an egalitarian and communal leadership reflecting consensual decision making.

Aerial surveys in the 1950s found further inhabited valleys in the highlands. The re-establishment of Australian administration following the war was followed by an expansion of that control, including over the previously mostly uncontrolled highland areas. Regular access did not occur until the 1950s. By 1970, 170,000 hectares (420,000 acres) was still officially regarded as uncontrolled. Some tribes remained uncontacted by Westerners until the 1960s and 1970s. The administration of the highlands led to a large expansion of coffee cultivation in the region. In-country migration during this time spread Tok Pisin further, even to Port Moresby. The 1966 census found that 37% spoke Tok Pisin, 13% English, and 8% Hiri Motu.

Legislation was proposed to legalise commercial birds-of-paradise hunting in 1965, but it was defeated. In 1966, the birds came under the protection of the new Fauna Protection Ordinance of Papua and New Guinea (amended in 1968 to allow for traditional hunting and use).

The 1961 Papua New Guinean general election opened political participation to local people. Village council powers were expanded in 1963, and ward councils were made possible for village councils with large populations. The 1964 election, and the subsequent 1968 election, took place alongside political campaigns to introduce the political system to people in the territory. The 1964 election occurred alongside the Council being replaced by the 64-member House of Assembly of Papua and New Guinea, part elected part appointed, which for the first time had a majority of Papua New Guinean members. Tok Pisin was spoken by 89% of this parliament, although one representative could speak none of the three major languages and so had their own translator. Over time, Tok Pisin became the primary language of debate The Assembly increased to 84 members in 1967 and 100 by 1972, at which point all members were elected. The leadup to the 1968 election saw the formation of Pangu Pati, the first political party. Pangu advocated for independence. Other parties that subsequently emerged were mostly differentiated by varying positions regarding independence.

Mining exploration by Rio Tinto in Bougainville began in 1964. This faced resistance from local landowners, however the Bougainville Copper corporation was established and began to operate a large mine. Resistance became interlinked with a desire for greater autonomy. Bougainville was geographically close to the British Solomon Islands, and its people are more culturally linked to those of the Solomon Islands than to others in the territory. However, the mine was seen as crucial for diversifying the economic base of Papua New Guinea from agriculture alone. An unsuccessful call for a referendum on separation was made by Bougainvilleans in Port Moresby in 1968, and further political efforts led to a provisional district government being established in 1973.

Australian Opposition Leader Gough Whitlam visited Papua New Guinea in 1969. In 1970 and 1971, he visited the Tolai people in the Gazelle Peninsula, who were seeking more control. Whitlam made self-rule in the territory an election issue, and called for self-governance as early as 1972. United Nations visiting missions in the early 1970s called for further political education to better explain the meaning of self-governance and of independence. In March 1971 the House of Assembly recommended that the territory seek self-governance in the next parliament, which was agreed to by Australia. Political education campaigns at the time increased emphasis on the idea of national unity. In June 1971, the flag and emblem were adopted. In July 1971, the "and" was removed and territory was renamed to simply "Papua New Guinea".

Following the time of Whitlam's first visit, political debate significantly intensified. This accompanied social change, such as an increase in education, symbolised by the first students graduating from the University of Papua New Guinea in 1970. District authorities (which would become provincial authorities) were established in 1970, helping develop provincial identity. A Constitutional Planning Committee made up of Papua New Guineans conducted domestic consultations while also looking for inspiration from post-colonial states in Africa. The committee settled upon a Westminster system, aiming to develop a political system where the legislature checks the executive.

In the 1972 Papua New Guinean general election in July, Michael Somare was elected as Chief Minister. Somare sought a better relationship with regional movements, negotiating to meet local needs rather than viewing such movements as an obstacle to a united independent state. His government announced specific plans to decentralise, and improve local self-sustainability. While these actions increased the number of local groups, they also decreased their salience and encouraged them to join the national political system. 1972 also saw a new economic strategy delivered to the government that recommended the indigenisation of the economy, an approach and rhetoric adopted by the Somare government. The Bank of Papua New Guinea was created in October. In December, Whitlam was elected as Prime Minister at the 1972 Australian federal election. The Whitlam Government then instituted self-governance in late 1973. The kina was introduced as a separate currency in April 1975.

On 1 September 1975, shortly before the scheduled date of Papua New Guinean independence, the government of Bougainville itself declared independence. Payments to the province were suspended in response. Other regional movements emerged prior to independence. The Papua Besena party sought to separate the territory of Papua from New Guinea. While the party symbolically declared independence prior to national independence, they later went on to participate in Papua New Guinean politics. The Highlands Liberation Front sought to prevent dominance of highland areas from the coast as well as from foreigners, although it sought more autonomy and representation rather than outright independence, and disappeared after independence. Smaller groups emerged in various areas to advocate for the creation of new provinces. The appearance of such groups was likely a combination of new ideas about politics, combined with little need for a united nationalist movement given the Australian agreement to independence.

The push for independence was driven by internal policies of the Whitlam government, rather than responding to particular calls from Papua New Guinea. The concept of a "country" remained foreign to many in the territory, and there was no strong shared national identity. In the early 1970s there were fears that independence would allow for large tribes to dominate others, and create more risk of foreign land acquisition. The subsequent creation of a local consensus for independence was due to the actions of local political leaders. Over the next two years, they advanced various arguments for independence. On 1 June 1974, the PNG government took control of civil aviation. The process culminated in the passing of the Papua New Guinea Independence Act 1975 in September 1975, citing the 16th of September 1975 as the date of independence.

Whitlam and then-Prince Charles attended the independence ceremony, with Somare continuing as the country's first Prime Minister.

== Independence ==
Elections in 1972 resulted in the formation of a ministry headed by Chief Minister Michael Somare, who pledged to lead the country to self-government and then to independence. Papua New Guinea became self-governing on 1 December 1973 and achieved independence on 16 September 1975. The country joined the United Nations (UN) on 10 October 1975 by way of Security Council Resolution 375 and General Assembly resolution 3368.

Upon independence, most Australian officials, including agricultural, economic, educational, and medicinal staff, left the territory. Very little training had been provided to their successors. This led to a restructuring and a loss of efficiency, particularly in serving rural areas. By the 1980s, the civil service, including the military, had become politicised, decreasing effectiveness and accountability.

While optional preferential voting had been used since 1964, the voting system was changed to first past the post, as an unsuccessful attempt to encourage the development of a two-party system with clearly defined political parties. Elected provincial governments were created in 1976, including for Bougainville. National governments changed through constitutional means. Somare retained the prime ministership following the 1977 election, and was ousted through a vote of no confidence in 1980. He became prime minister again following the 1982 election, but lost another vote of no confidence in 1985.

=== Political instability ===
The 1977 national elections confirmed Michael Somare as Prime Minister at the head of a coalition led by the Pangu Party. However, his government lost a vote of confidence in 1980 and was replaced by a new cabinet headed by Sir Julius Chan as prime minister. The 1982 elections increased Pangu's plurality, and parliament again chose Somare as prime minister. In November 1985, the Somare government lost another vote of no confidence, and the parliamentary majority elected Paias Wingti, at the head of a five-party coalition, as prime minister. A coalition, headed by Wingti, was victorious in very close elections in July 1987. In July 1988, a no-confidence vote toppled Wingti and brought to power Rabbie Namaliu, who a few weeks earlier had replaced Somare as leader of the Pangu Party.

A Leadership Code came into force on 3 March 1978, creating some disagreements.

Such developments and frequent changes of prime minister continue to characterize Papua New Guinea's national politics. A plethora of political parties, coalition governments, shifting party loyalties and motions of no confidence in the leadership all lend an air of instability to political proceedings. Under legislation intended to enhance stability, new governments remain immune from no-confidence votes for the first 18 months of their incumbency.

In 1987, proposals were made to increase the election deposit required of political candidates tenfold, from K100 to K1000, in an attempt to reduce the growing number of candidates. Initially blocked by the judiciary, it past legislatively before the 1992 election, although the number of candidates continued to increase.

Changes of government were frequent. In 1991, the period in which a government could not face a no confidence vote was increased from 6 months to 18 months. In 1993, Manus Province switched from first past the post to preferential voting.

In 1995, provincial governments were reformed, becoming made up of relevant national MPs and a number of appointed members. This followed frequent tensions emerging between elected provincial governments and national MPs from those provinces. Some of their responsibilities were devolved towards local governments, a factor that caused significant controversy due to an expected lack of capacity at this level. This lack of capacity has meant that national MPs gained significant powers at the local level. A 2000 legal seminar found that all provincial and local governments had been functioning illegally since 1997.

In the 1997 election, 73% of all candidates were independent, including 33% of winning candidates, reflecting a steady shift from party politics. The 2372 total candidates meant there was an average of 22 contestants per constituency, with Oro Province having the most, with 61 candidates. Only 4 candidates achieved overall majorities, with 95 (87%) of winners receiving less than 30% of the vote, and 16 (14%) receiving less than 10%. Of the 109 MPs elected, only 2 were women. Somare commented that this meant the parliament did not have much mandate, having been rejected by 80.20% of the population. After government changed mid-parliament in 1999, a Constitutional Development Commission was established to bring about political reform. The resulting Organic Law on the Integrity of Political Parties and Candidates created public funding for registered parties based on their elected members of parliament, incentivised the selection of women candidates, and instituted punishments for party hopping. It also barred independent MPs from voting for the prime minister, or from joining coalitions before a prime minister is elected. Another measure was to begin a shift from a simple first past the post voting system to a Limited Preferential Vote system (LPV), a version of the alternative vote. The 2007 general election was the first to be conducted using LPV, although it had already been used in 10 by-elections.

=== Bougainville Island revolt ===
Although an August 1976 agreement with the national government resolved the initial declaration of independence, the issue of Bougainville persisted past independence, with profits from the mine seeing as being of more a benefit to the national government than the people of Bougainville. Bougainville had been the primary mining region of the country, at one point generating almost 50% of exports and 20% of national revenue. A secessionist movement in 1975–76 on Bougainville Island resulted in a modification of the Constitution of Papua New Guinea, with the Organic Law on Provincial Government legally devolving power to the 19 provinces. The actual devolution happened on different timescales for each province, which had greatly varying capacities. Bougainville was the first, with a formal provincial government established in 1976. Some provincial governments were suspended in the 1980s, due to financial mismanagement. Somare's proposal to reduce provincial power brought further threats of secession from some of the country's island provinces.

The employment needs of the Bougainville mine decreased after construction was completed, leading younger individuals receiving little benefit from the presence of the mine. A renewed uprising on Bougainville started in 1988, fighting against both the Bougainville government and the national government. After the mine closed in May 1989, the Bougainville Revolutionary Army (BRA) declared independence, and the national government pulled out in 1990 and blockaded the province, the conflict shifted into a complex internal civil war. National security forces re-entered the island at the end of 1990, and together with local allies slowly gained more control. An agreement between the government and some rebels was reached in October 1994, and in 1995 a transitional Bougainville government is established, although fighting continued with the BRA. The head of the transitional government, Theodore Miriung, was assassinated in 1996.

In 1997, the Sandline affair over the hiring of mercenaries to intervene in Bougainville brought down the national government. Following New Zealand-mediated peace talks, a ceasefire was reached in January 1998. Around 20,000 are thought to have died before the conflict came to an end. The ceasefire also saw that Bougainville would establish a representative government and would not be subject to 1995 national legislation relating to provincial and local governments. The Bougainville People's Congress was formed to represent the province, however, disputes over the suspension of the previous government led to a compromise in the formation of the Bougainville Interim Provincial Government.

As a result of reports following the Sandline affair and tense civil-military relations, the PNGDF was shrunk from 3,700 people to 2,000. A peace agreement was signed in 2001, under which Bougainville would gain higher autonomy than other provinces, and it was agreed that an independence referendum would be held in the future. In 2003 the PNGDF participated in the Regional Assistance Mission to Solomon Islands.

A nine-year secessionist revolt on the island of Bougainville claimed some 20,000 lives. The rebellion began in early 1989, active hostilities ended with a truce in October 1997 and a permanent ceasefire was signed in April 1998. A peace agreement between the Government and ex-combatants was signed in August 2001. A regional peace-monitoring force and a UN observer mission monitors the government and provincial leaders who have established an interim administration and are working toward complete surrender of weapons, the election of a provincial government and an eventual referendum on independence.

The government and rebels negotiated a peace agreement that established the Bougainville Autonomous District and Province. The autonomous Bougainville elected Joseph Kabui as president in 2005, who served until his death in 2008. He was succeeded by his deputy John Tabinaman as acting president while an election to fill the unexpired term was organised. James Tanis won that election in December 2008 and served until the inauguration of John Momis, the winner of the 2010 elections. As part of the current peace settlement, a referendum on independence is planned to be held in Bougainville sometime before mid-2020. Preparations were underway in 2015.

=== Governance ===
While warfare significantly decreased under Australian governance, Tribal fighting in the highland areas increased in the 1970s. These areas had been under outside control for less time, meaning former tribal conflict was still remembered and restarted upon independence. The first state of emergency there was declared in 1979, although it and similar interventions did not quell the violence. Unemployment and imbalanced gender ratios in cities meant tribal fighting morphed into the emergence of gangs. Gang violence led to a state of emergency in Port Moresby in 1984, which led to the intervention of the Papua New Guinea Defence Force (PNGDF). This was effective, and led to further police and military interventions elsewhere. Both the police and military became more politicised, and less disciplined. Demand for private security increased as a response, and foreign investment was deterred. The re-emergence of such violence was likely exacerbated by population increases, the increasing value of land for resources and cash crops, the weakening of local traditional authority structures, electoral competition, the spread of cars and alcohol, and more powerful guns.

A number of governmental changes were made as part of a World Bank Group programme put in place to help the government recover from its 1994 financial crisis. In June 1995, the Organic Law on Provincial and Local Level Governments (OLPLLG) was enacted. This effectively eliminated the former provincial governments, replacing them with bodies made up of national MPs from each province. The MP elected at-large from each province became the provincial Governor, while district MPs became Presidents of their district assemblies. The new provincial assemblies consisted of national MPs and representative from the district governments of each province. In many provinces, the institutional capacity needed to implement this reform was lacking. National legislation called for by OLPLLG also took many years to be produced, resulting in legal uncertainty at provincial and national levels. Aimed at reducing provincial mismanagement, the OLPLLG achieved this through increasing the financial power of MPs. At the same time, the increased responsibilities of district governments meant the potential for much mismanagement merely shifted.

In the 1996 budget, the Electoral Development Funds (EDF) that saw each MP have personal responsibility for the distribution of K300,000, were abolished. These were viewed as slush funds, and international creditors providing funds to the Papua New Guinean government sought their elimination. However, while EDFs were abolished, a new set of funds known as the Rural Action Programme (RAP) were created, effectively recreating EDFs. Proposed reforms to land tenure and the civil service were unsuccessful.

=== Economics ===
The first decade of independence saw slow but steady economic growth. The Ok Tedi Mine opened in 1982. While Australian contribution to the budget dropped from 40% of government revenue in 1975 to 17% in 1988, improved taxation allowed for government expenditure to be maintained. The closure of the Bougainville mine led to issues with government finances, however an expansion of exports of oil, minerals, and forestry products led to economic recovery in the early 1990s. This growth did not decrease inequality however, and government services declined. This economic decline both caused and was exacerbated by increases in violence. Local violence damaged infrastructure, and defence expenditure increased. In 1986 the public services lost a significant degree of independence, leading to their becoming more politicised. Increasing government expense and resulting rising debt led to significant economic trouble. The Papua New Guinean kina was devalued and put on a floating exchange rate in 1994, and the country obtained an emergency loan from the World Bank in 1995.

=== Ethnic tensions ===
Numerous Chinese have worked and lived in Papua New Guinea, establishing Chinese-majority communities, and Chinese merchants became established in the islands before European exploration. Anti-Chinese rioting involving tens of thousands of people broke out in May 2009. The initial spark was a fight between ethnic Chinese and Papua New Guinean workers at a nickel factory under construction by a Chinese company. Native resentment against Chinese ownership of numerous small businesses and their commercial monopoly in the islands led to the rioting.

=== Natural disasters ===
A drought in 1997 caused by the El Niño–Southern Oscillation killed over 1,000 people. In 1998, an earthquake generated tsunamis that killed over 1,500 people. Rising sea levels led to the declaration that residents of the Duke of York archipelago would need to leave in 2000. Flooding caused by Cyclone Guba in 2007 displaced 13,000 people.

=== 2000s to present ===
In 2001 an Australian detention centre was established on Manus Island. The 2002 election saw an uptick in violence. Australian police were brought to PNG to help train PNG police in 2004. While most left the next year after a Supreme Court ruling, this began a long-term Australian police presence in the country. The Manus detention centre was expanded in 2013, before growing controversy and legal action led to its closure in 2017.

The 2000s saw significant economic growth, in large part due to an expansion in the mining, oil, and gas sectors, although the country's Human Development Index (HDI) rating declined. The debt-to-GDP ratio dropped from 72 per cent in 2002 to 22 per cent in 2011. Gambling was legalised in 2007, and the first agreement to export LNG to China was signed in 2009.

A peace agreement was signed with Bougainville in 2001. The first elections for the new autonomous government took place in 2005. The autonomous Bougainville elected Joseph Kabui as president, who served until he died in 2008. He was succeeded by his deputy John Tabinaman as acting president while an election to fill the unexpired term was organised. James Tanis won that election in December 2008 and served until the inauguration of John Momis, the winner of the 2010 elections, in June 2010.

In 2009, Parliament approved the creation of two additional provinces: Hela Province, consisting of part of the existing Southern Highlands Province, and Jiwaka Province, formed by dividing Western Highlands Province. Jiwaka and Hela officially became separate provinces on 17 May 2012. The declaration of Hela and Jiwaka is a result of the largest liquefied natural gas project in the country that is situated in both provinces.

Also in 2009, Papua New Guinea asked various southeast Asian nations for their support for Papua New Guinea's full membership bid in the ASEAN. Indonesia supported the bid after Papua New Guinea supported Indonesia's hold on its Papua region.

In 2011, there was a constitutional crisis between the parliament-elect Prime Minister, Peter O'Neill (voted into office by a large majority of MPs), and Somare, who was deemed by the supreme court to retain office. The stand-off between parliament and the Supreme Court continued, with both camps setting up rival governments. The courts ruled that legislation passed by the O'Neill government was void, while parliament passed legislation increasing its control over the judiciary. At one point the deputy prime minister Belden Namah entered the supreme court, escorted by police, ostensibly to arrest the chief justice Salamo Injia and fellow judge Nicholas Kirriwom. The judicial legislation effectively removed the chief justice, and other laws passed included limiting the age for a prime minister. In January 2012, a brief military mutiny emerged calling for the reinstation of Somare. The parliament voted to delay the upcoming elections, however they did not have the constitutional authority to do this, and the Papua New Guinea Electoral Commission continued to prepare. The parliament-elect prime minister eventually carried the votes for the writs for the new election to be issued slightly late but for the election itself to occur on time, thereby avoiding a continuation of the constitutional crisis. The 2012 national elections went ahead as scheduled, and O'Neill was once again elected as prime minister by a majority of parliament. Somare joined O'Neill's government, charges against the court judges and others who supported Somare were dropped, and the legislation asserting control of the judiciary and that affecting the office of the prime minister was repealed. Leo Dion, the former Governor of East New Britain Province, was deputy prime minister.

In the early years of independence, the instability of the party system led to frequent votes of no confidence in parliament, with resulting changes of the government, but with referral to the electorate through national elections only occurring every five years. In 1991, legislation was passed preventing such votes sooner than 18 months after a national election (successful votes within 12 months of the next election led to an automatic election). In November 2012, the first (of three) readings were passed to prevent votes of no confidence occurring within the first 30 months. The second reading passed in February 2013. Proponents argued that a restriction on votes of no confidence would provide greater stability, while opponents said such changes would reduce the accountability of the executive branch of government to parliament. In September 2015, the Supreme Court invalidated the change.

Liquefied natural gas exports began in 2014, however falling prices as well as lower oil prices meant that government revenue was lower than expected. The debt-to-GDP ratio rose, and as of 2019, Papua New Guinea's HDI rating was the lowest in the Pacific. In March 2015 the Bougainville Mining Act shifted control over mining from the national government to the Bougainville government. It also stated that minerals belonged to customary landowners rather than the state, giving landowners vetos over future extraction.

The 2012–2017 O'Neill government was dogged by corruption scandals. The 2017 general election saw O'Neill return as prime minister, although initially with a smaller coalition. This election saw widespread voter intimidation in some regions, and delays in the reporting of seat results. Financial scandals, as well as criticism of the purchase of expensive cars for APEC Papua New Guinea 2018 meeting, created pressure on O'Neill and led to defections from government, although O'Neill was initially protected from deposition by the 18-month bar on no confidence votes. In May 2019, O'Neill resigned as prime minister and was replaced through a vote of Parliament by James Marape. Marape was a key minister in O'Neill's government, and his defection from the government to the opposition camp finally led to O'Neill's resignation from office. Davis Steven was appointed deputy prime minister, justice Minister and Attorney General. An Independent Commission Against Corruption was created through legislation in 2020.

The government set 23 November 2019 as the voting date for a non-binding independence referendum in the Bougainville autonomous region. The independence referendum took place between 23 November and 7 December 2019, providing a choice between greater autonomy within Papua New Guinea and full independence for Bougainville. Voters overwhelmingly voted for independence (98.31%). In December 2019, the autonomous region voted overwhelmingly for independence, with 97.7% voting in favour of obtaining full independence and around 1.7% voting in favour of greater autonomy. Negotiations between the Bougainville government and national Papua New Guinea on a path to Bougainville independence began in 2021.

From February to March 2018, a chain of earthquakes hit Papua New Guinea, causing various damages. Various nations from Oceania, including Australia and New Zealand, immediately sent aid to the country.

In May 2019, James Marape was appointed as the new prime minister, after a tumultuous few months in the country's political life. Marape was a key minister in his predecessor Peter O’Neill’s government, and his defection from the government to the opposition camp had finally led to O’Neill's resignation from office. In July 2022, Prime Minister James Marape's PANGU Party secured the most seats of any party in the election, meaning James Marape was elected to continue as PNG's Prime Minister.

After an election widely criticised by observers for its inadequate preparation (including failure to update the electoral roll), abuses and violence, in July 2022, Prime Minister James Marape's PANGU Party secured the most seats of any party in the election, enabling James Marape to be invited to form a coalition government, which he succeeded in doing and he continued as PNG's Prime Minister. In the 2022 Election two women were elected into the eleventh Parliament, one, Rufina Peter, also became Provincial governor of Central Province.

On 10 January 2024 a riot broke out in Port Moresby where shops and cars were torched and supermarkets looted. Riots also occurred in the city of Lae. 22 lives were lost in the riots. They arose after police and members of the public sector protested over pay. The prime minister, James Marape, declared a 14-day state of emergency.
