= British New Guinea =

Former British protectorate

- 1884–1902
- Flag
- Status: British protectorate (1884–1888); British crown colony (1888–1902)
- Capital: Port Moresby

Establishment
  - Protectorate proclaimed: 21 October 1884
  - Crown colony status: 4 September 1888
  - Transfer to Australia: 18 March 1902
- Currency: British pound
Preceded by	Succeeded by
Colony of Queensland	Territory of Papua

British New Guinea (BNG) was a protectorate and later Crown colony within the British Empire from 1884 to 1902. It comprised the south-eastern portion of the island of New Guinea, largely corresponding to the southern portion of present-day Papua New Guinea, and bordered Dutch New Guinea to the west and German New Guinea to the north.

A British protectorate was proclaimed over the south-eastern coast of New Guinea in 1884, in response to agitation from the self-governing Australian colonies to the south – notably the abortive annexation of East New Guinea by the colony of Queensland in 1883 – and to the establishment of German New Guinea. Initially falling under the authority of the High Commissioner for the Western Pacific, the entirety of the south-east was formally annexed in 1888 and placed under an administrator (later designated as a lieutenant-governor).

British New Guinea held an unusual status within the Empire in that it was legally subordinate to Queensland. Funding for its administration was wholly provided by Queensland and the other Australian colonies of New South Wales and Victoria, which viewed the territory as strategically and commercially significant. Following the federation of the Australian colonies, in 1902 the British government transferred the administration of the colony to the new Australian federal government. It was formally reorganised in 1906 as the Territory of Papua and remained under Australian administration until the independence of Papua New Guinea in 1975.

== Background ==
In November 1882, Allgemeine Zeitung published an article calling for the German annexation of New Guinea. Alarmed by this prospect, Sir Thomas McIlwraith, the Premier of Queensland, cabled London in February 1883, urging the British government to annex New Guinea to Queensland, but received no answer. On 20 March, hearing the story that SMS Carola was about to leave Sydney for the South Seas "with object of annexation", he telegraphed Henry Chester, the police magistrate at Thursday Island, to sail for New Guinea and "take formal possession in Her Majesty’s name of whole of the Island with exception of that portion in occupation of the Dutch". Chester made the proclamation at Port Moresby on 4 April, but the imperial British government disapproved of the annexation: the British Colonial Secretary Lord Derby emphasised in a despatch to the Queensland government that such an action was beyond Queensland's constitutional powers as a British colony.

== Protectorate, 1884–1888 ==
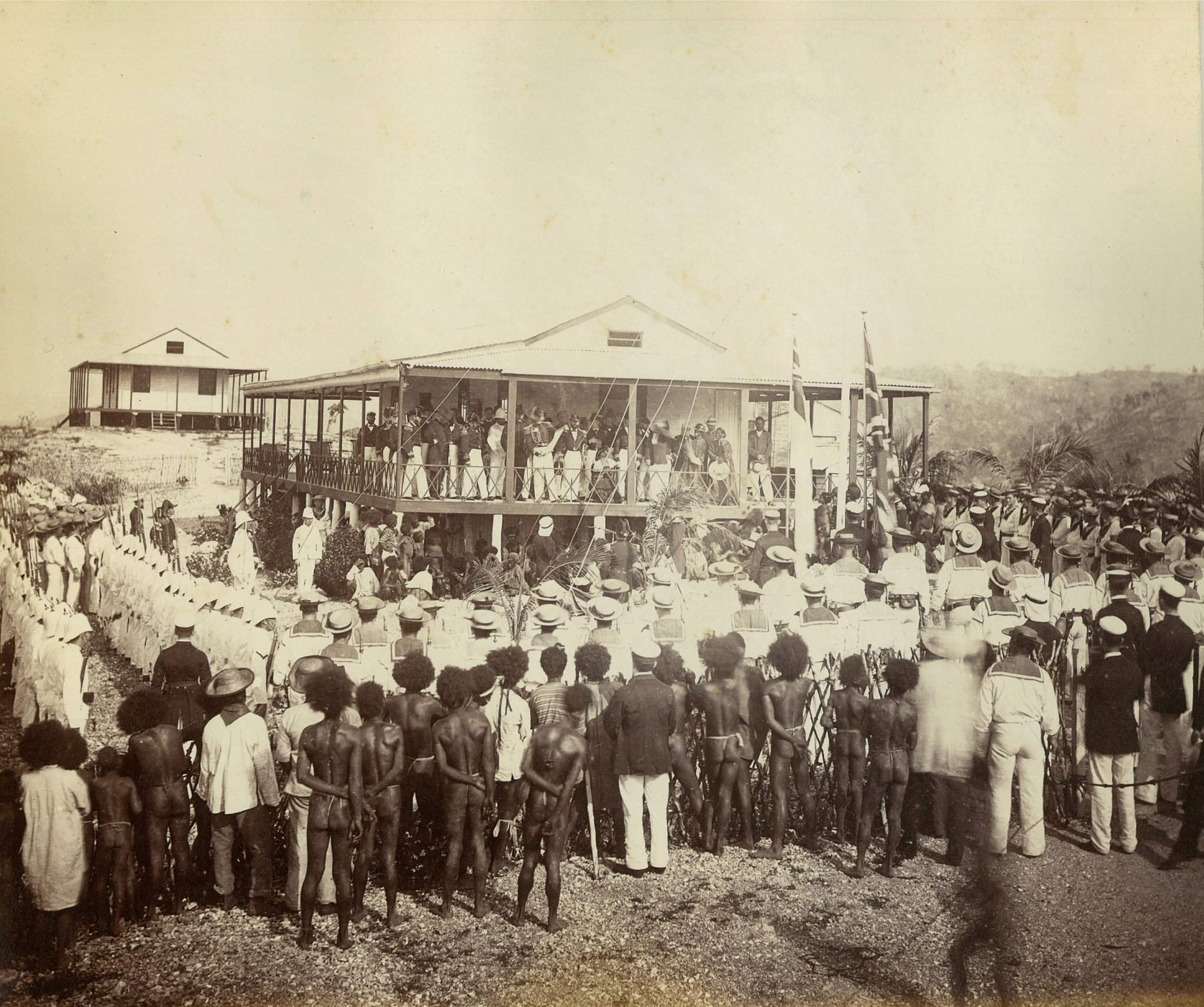
Photograph depicting the proclamation of the British protectorate in Port Moresby in November 1884, at the house of William George Lawes

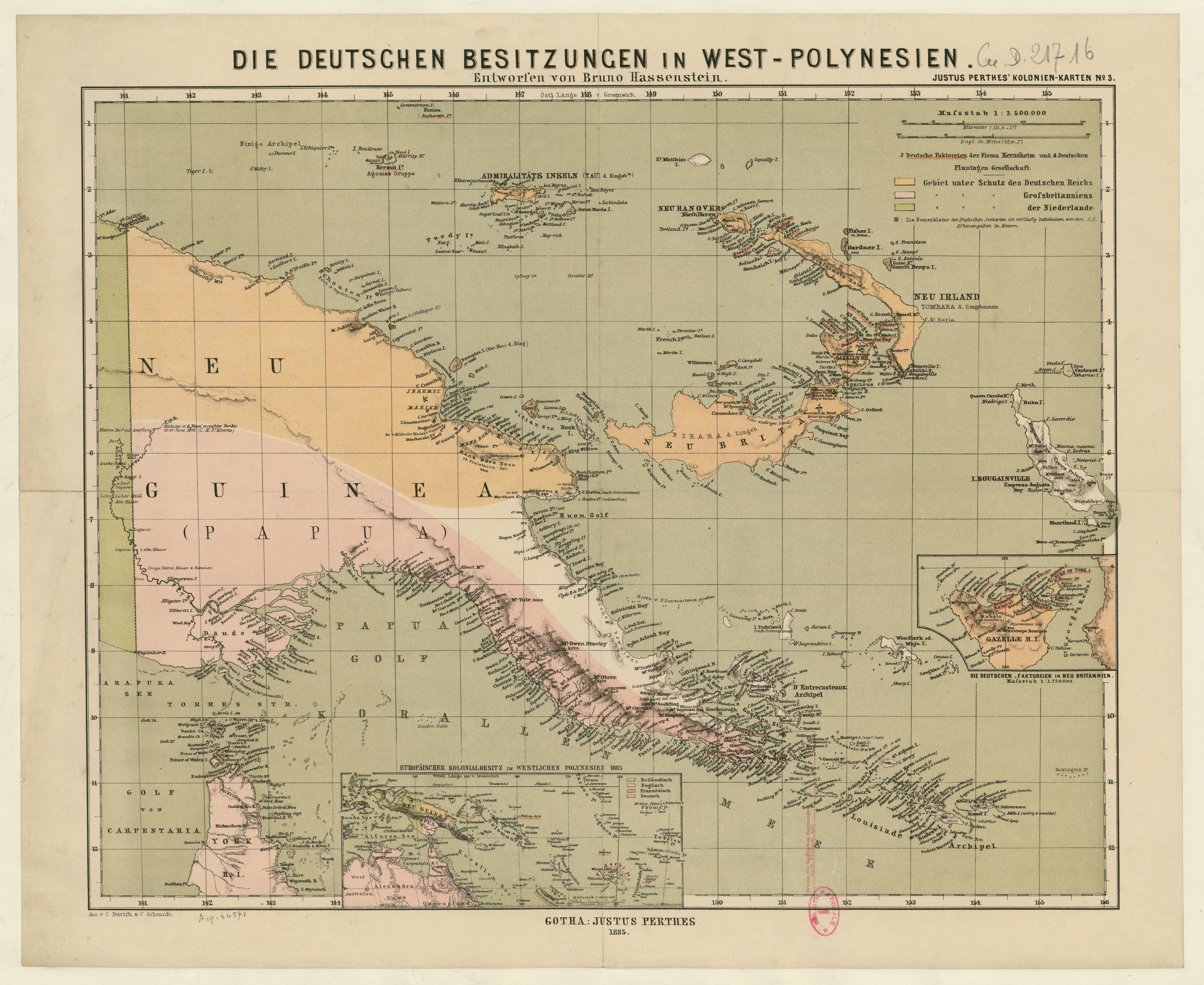
German map of New Guinea c. 1885, showing the initial British protectorate extending only to East Cape and the uncertain boundary between the German and British spheres of influence

In October 1884, Commodore James Erskine of the Australia Station was ordered to proceed to Port Moresby and proclaim a British protectorate over the southeastern coast of the island of New Guinea, spanning from East Cape to the boundary of Dutch New Guinea in the west. Erskine arrived in Port Moresby to find that Hugh Hastings Romilly had already proclaimed the protectorate on 21 October, having misinterpreted a telegram from Lord Derby. A further proclamation and flag-raising ceremony was nonetheless held on 6 November, with Erskine presiding. A separate "grand assembly" of British officials and local chiefs was held aboard HMS Nelson, with "a feast for the chiefs and an address from the commodore, a presentation of gifts attractive to the native eye, and the firing of the ship's guns". The chiefs – whose local status or authority was unclear – were presented with an English copy of the proclamation, with missionaries attempting to translate its meaning. Further flag-raising ceremonies were held along the coastline over the next month, ending at Teste Island on 26 November.

The new protectorate was initially placed under the authority of the High Commissioner for the Western Pacific, with Romilly remaining as de facto administrator until Peter Scratchley was appointed as special commissioner. He did not arrive in Port Moresby until August 1885 and died of malaria four months later, with former Queensland premier John Douglas succeeding in the role in 1886. The administration was constrained by a lack of funds, staff and equipment, as the Colonial Office debated funding for the protectorate with the Australian colonies. British authority was largely symbolic, although several punitive expeditions were conducted during the protectorate by Royal Navy vessels from the Australia Station.

The protectorate's initial extent over inland New Guinea was unclear, with British minister Evelyn Ashley stating only that it would extend "as far as local circumstances may demand". In 1885, the British and German governments reached a draft agreement on the boundaries between their two protectorates, which were formalised in the Anglo-German Declarations about the Western Pacific Ocean of 1886.

== Crown colony, 1888–1902 ==
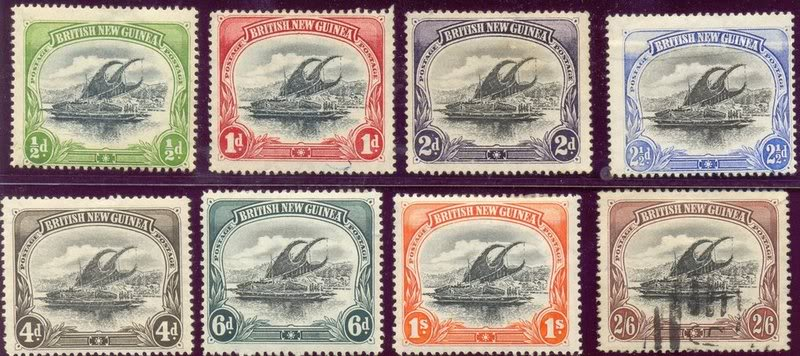
British New Guinea stamp issue of 1901 depicting the traditional lakatoi watercraft

After the proclamation of the protectorate, the Australian colonies continued to lobby the British government for full annexation. In April 1886, the colonies of New South Wales, Queensland and Victoria agreed that they would provide funding for the administration of British New Guinea of up to £15,000 (equivalent to $2,000,000 in 2023) per year. The parliament of Queensland subsequently passed the British New Guinea (Queensland) Act 1887 to indemnify the British government for that amount for a period of 10 years.

On 8 June 1888, letters patent were issued allowing for British annexation and the creation of a local government, with William MacGregor appointed as the first administrator. On 4 September 1888, McGregor formally proclaimed the south-eastern portion of New Guinea as a Crown colony of the United Kingdom under the name "British New Guinea". The administrator of the new colony was made subordinate to the governor of Queensland, a demand made by the Australian colonies, with the Supreme Court of Queensland as the court of appeal.

== Transfer to Australia ==
Following the federation of Australian colonies in 1901, it was assumed by both the British government and the new Australian federal government that British New Guinea would be transferred to Australia. Prime Minister Edmund Barton supported the acquisition of the territory, as well as other British possessions in the Pacific, but he and his cabinet were reluctant to immediately assume responsibility for financial reasons. In November 1901, the Parliament of Australia passed a resolution authorising the government to accept control of British New Guinea from the United Kingdom and providing for interim funding. At this point, the colony had only around 600 white residents, consisting "mainly of government officials, missionaries and small-time miners".

On 18 March 1902, on the advice of the British government, King Edward VII issued letters patent to "place our Possession of British New Guinea under the authority of the Commonwealth of Australia", with the governor-general of Australia replacing the governor of Queensland as the constitutional authority in the territory until the Parliament of Australia legislated otherwise. A bill to establish a new government under the name "Territory of Papua" was introduced in July 1903, but due to political changes the Papua Act 1905 was not passed into law until 16 November 1905 and its provisions were not enacted until 1 September 1906.

== See also ==
- List of colonial heads of New Guinea
- New Guinea Exploration Expedition (1885)

== Sources ==
- Kerr, Alan (2009). A Federation in These Seas: An Account of the Acquisition by Australia of its External Territories, With Selected Documents (PDF). Attorney-General's Department. ISBN 1921241721.
- Mayo, John (1975). "From Protectorate to Possession: British New Guinea 1884–88". Australian Journal of Politics & History. 21 (3): 54–69. doi:10.1111/j.1467-8497.1975.tb01152.x.
- Nelson, Hank (1978). "The swinging index: Capital punishment and British and Australian administrations in Papua and New Guinea, 1888–1945". Journal of Pacific History. 13: 130–152. doi:10.1080/00223347808572351.
- Overlack, Peter (1979). "Queensland's annexation of Papua: a background to Anglo-German friction". Journal of the Royal Historical Society of Queensland. 10 (4): 123–138.
- Thompson, Roger C. (1980). Australian Imperialism in the Pacific: The Expansionist Era, 1820-1920. Melbourne University Press. ISBN 9780522842074.
- van Dijk, Kees (2025). Pacific Strife: The Great Powers and Their Political and Economic Rivalries in Asia and the Western Pacific, 1870-1914. Routledge, Chapman & Hall. ISBN 9781041183839.
