= New Guinea Act 1920 =

Act of the Parliament of Australia

Parliament of Australia
- Long title: An Act to make provision for the Acceptance of a Mandate for the Government of certain Territories and Islands in the Pacific Ocean and to make immediate provision for the Civil Government of the said Territories and Islands for other purposes.
- Citation: New Guinea Act 1920 (Cth) No. 25 of 1920
- Assented to: 30 September 1920
- Commenced: 19 May 1921

Repealed by
- Papua and New Guinea Act 1949
- Status: Repealed

The New Guinea Act 1920 was an act passed by the Parliament of the Commonwealth of Australia, which saw the transfer of the territory of German New Guinea from Germany to Australia under terms of the Treaty of Versailles.

The act formally established the Territory of New Guinea as a League of Nations Mandated Territory that was to be administered by Australia. The act remained in effect until New Guinea's merger with the Territory of Papua following the passage of the Papua and New Guinea Act 1949.

== History ==
New Guinea was originally an Imperial German colony at the start of the 20th century. In 1914, following the outbreak of the First World War, German New Guinea was occupied by the Australian Naval and Military Expeditionary Force and remained under Australian military control until 1920. Following the British Empire's victory over Germany, the subsequent Treaty of Versailles, the Prime Minister of Australia Billy Hughes pushed for New Guinea to be annexed to Australia. This was despite British intent to make it one of the Trust Territories of the Pacific with a view to New Guinea's gradual independence. A compromise was made in the treaty to allow Australia to run it as a League of Nations mandate but retain control over immigration.

The New Guinea Act 1920 was passed by the Parliament of Australia to enable the Governor-General of Australia to accept the mandate for Australia and establish Australian rule. The act required that the Governor-General appoint an Administrator for the territory and that the Governor-General had to report on New Guinea to the League of Nations annually. The act also affirmed the abolition of slavery in New Guinea. The act was repealed by the Papua and New Guinea Act 1949, which established local rule under Australian administration and formally merged the Territory of Papua with New Guinea to create the Territory of Papua and New Guinea.
