= Papua New Guinea Independence Act 1975 =

Act of independence of Papua New Guinea

Parliament of Australia
- Long title: An Act relating to the attainment of Independence by Papua New Guinea.
- Citation: Papua New Guinea Independence Act 1975 (Cth) No. 98 of 1975
- Assented to: 9 September 1975
- Commenced: 16 September 1975

Related legislation
- Papua and New Guinea Act 1949
- Status: Current legislation

The Papua New Guinea Independence Act 1975 is legislation passed by the Parliament of Australia. It replaced the Papua and New Guinea Act 1949, and changed the status of the Territory of Papua and New Guinea to that of an independent Papua New Guinea. The act set 16 September 1975 as the date of Papua New Guinea's independence and terminated all remaining sovereign and legislative powers of Australia over the country.

== History ==
Papua New Guinea originated as the colonies of British New Guinea and German New Guinea, which brought under separate Australian administration in the early 20th century as the Territory of Papua and the Territory of New Guinea. The two were brought under a merged administration under the Papua and New Guinea Act 1949. In 1972, the Prime Minister of Australia, Gough Whitlam announced that Papua New Guinea independence would be a key element of his foreign policy. The announcement was not popular with Australian expatriates living in Papua New Guinea. The Papua New Guinea Independence Act was passed in 1975 in order to grant Papua New Guinea independence from Australia.

Though the act granted independence to Papua New Guinea, it did not define what their governance system would be. The Papua New Guineans voted to invite Queen Elizabeth II to be Papua New Guinea's head of state, represented by a Governor-General. The Queen accepted the invitation and became Queen of Papua New Guinea. The independence ceremony was held on 16 September 1975, attended by Prince Charles representing the Queen, the Governor-General of Australia Sir John Kerr and Whitlam.

=== Legality ===
In 2025, arguments were made that the Papua New Guinea Independence Act was passed illegally. The proponents of the argument argued that under Section 128 of the Constitution of Australia, a referendum was needed for constitutional changes such as removing a territory from Australia. However, the argument was dismissed on the grounds that Papua New Guinea had always been an administered territory and thus under Section 122, no referendum was needed for legislation related to it.

== See also ==
- Nauru Independence Act 1967
