= Papua Act 1905 =

Act of the Parliament of Australia

Parliament of Australia
- Long title: An Act to provide for the acceptance of British New Guinea as a Territory under the authority of the Commonwealth, and for the Government thereof.
- Citation: Papua Act 1905 (Cth) No. 9 of 1905
- Assented to: 16 November 1905
- Commenced: 1 September 1906
- Repealed: 1 July 1949
- Introduced by: Deakin Government

Amended by
- Papua Acts 1920–1940

Repealed by
- Papua and New Guinea Act 1949
- Status: Repealed

The Papua Act 1905 was an act of the Parliament of Australia which provided for the Territory of Papua to be organised as a replacement for the former British New Guinea, which had been transferred to Australian control in 1902. The provisions of the new act went into force on 1 September 1906, establishing Papua as the first Australian external territory established pursuant to the constitution of Australia. It formally incorporated Papua as an external territory of Australia and remained in effect until Papua's merger with the Territory of New Guinea with the passage of the Papua and New Guinea Act 1949.

== Legislative history ==
In February 1903, Attorney-General Alfred Deakin instructed the parliamentary draughtsman to prepare a bill for the administration of British New Guinea as an Australian territory. The government intended for the bill to be passed by parliament later in the year and come into effect on 1 January 1904. Barton introduced the British New Guinea Administration Bill into parliament on 16 July 1903. The name of the bill was changed at its second reading to the Papua (British New Guinea) Bill, with Barton stating that "Papua" would be "a shorter and better name for the territory" and reflect that it was no longer a direct British possession, although it remained part of the British Empire. The bill, with several amendments, passed its second reading in August 1903. In September 1903, defence minister James Drake announced that the government would withdraw the bill pending the resolution of "certain enquiries" on the administration of British New Guinea.

== Sources ==
- Kerr, Alan (2009). A Federation in These Seas: An Account of the Acquisition by Australia of its External Territories, With Selected Documents (PDF). Attorney-General's Department. ISBN 1921241721.
