= Papua and New Guinea Act 1949 =

Act of the Parliament of Australia

Parliament of Australia
- Long title: An Act to approve the placing of the Territory of New Guinea under the International Trusteeship System, to provide for the Government of the Territory of Papua and the Territory of New Guinea, and for other purposes.
- Citation: Papua and New Guinea Act 1949 (Cth) No. 9 of 1949
- Assented to: 25 March 1949
- Commenced: 1 July 1949
- Repealed: 16 September 1975

Repealed by
- Papua New Guinea Independence Act 1975
- Status: Repealed

The Papua and New Guinea Act 1949 was an Act passed by the Parliament of Australia. It replaced the Papua Act 1905 and the New Guinea Act 1920, and changed the status of the territories of Papua and New Guinea by merging their administrations to form Papua and New Guinea. The Act established local rule, although the territory remained under control by Australia. The Act was repealed by the Papua New Guinea Independence Act 1975 which allowed for Papua New Guinea's independence from Australia.

== Sources ==
- Kerr, Alan (2009). A Federation in These Seas: An Account of the Acquisition by Australia of its External Territories, With Selected Documents (PDF). Attorney-General's Department. ISBN 1921241721.
