= Herbert William Champion =

Acting Lieutenant-Governor of Papua
- In office 1940
- Preceded by: Hubert Murray
- Succeeded by: Hubert Leonard Murray

Government Secretary of Papua
- In office 1913–1942
- Preceded by: Alexander Malcolm Campbell
- Succeeded by: None

Treasurer of Papua
- In office 1908–1913
- Preceded by: David Ballantine
- Succeeded by: Robert William Turner Kendrick

Personal details
- Born: 8 August 1880 Kaiapoi, New Zealand
- Died: 12 May 1972 (aged 91) Chatswood, Australia

Herbert William Champion CBE (8 August 1880 – 12 May 1972), usually known as H. W. Champion, was an administrator in the government of British New Guinea and the Australian Territory of Papua. During his time in Papua from 1898 to 1942, he served as Government Storekeeper, Treasurer, Government Secretary and acting Lieutenant-Governor.

== Early life ==
H.W. Champion was born on 8 August 1880 in Kaiapoi, on the South Island of New Zealand, the eldest child of Charles James Champion and Frances Mary (née Stringer). He left home at the age of 17, taking a ship for Australia where he found a job with Burns, Philp & Co. At the end of the 19th century Burns Philp had become a major merchant shipping company in the South Pacific and the first provider of tourist trips to British New Guinea. In 1898, just a year after his arrival in Australia, his new employer sent Champion to work in the company storehouse in Port Moresby in New Guinea.

When Champion arrived in Port Moresby, the town consisted of little more than twenty buildings clustered around the harbour, home to a non-indigenous population of some 35 men and 15 women. Champion occupied a corrugated-iron cottage on the site of Burns Philps' recently constructed wharf and warehouse, and was responsible for overseeing the loading and unloading of the company’s vessels. Soon after his arrival, Champion came to the attention of Lieutenant-Governor George Le Hunte, who offered him the job of assistant government storeman. In this job, Champion worked for Henry Chester, the son of the Henry Marjoribanks Chester, who in 1883 had attempted to annex New Guinea on behalf of the government of Queensland.

In December 1901, Chester died in an accidental fall, leaving his wife Florence and four year-old son William Neville Chester. Champion was given Chester’s job as government storekeeper in 1902, and a year later married Florence in Port Moresby. The couple had three more sons, Ivan, Allan and Claude, all of whom later also joined the government service. Their eldest son, Ivan, later won fame as a leading explorer of Papua, and with Charles Karius, undertook the two great journeys of the North-West Patrol. This expedition, traversing the island of Papua New Guinea between 1926 and 1928, was memorialized in his book Across New Guinea from the Fly to the Sepik. Around 1904, Champion became partially deaf.

== Public administration ==
Not long after being promoted to government storekeeper, Champion joined the Treasury department and by 1906 (when the territory formally transferred to Australian administration and was renamed the Territory of Papua) had become the Chief Clerk of the Treasury. In 1906 Australian Prime Minister Alfred Deakin appointed a Royal Commission to investigate the governance of the territory, which ended with the dismissal of most of the senior executives of the administration, including the Administrator Francis Barton for Barton, he emerged with credit from the Royal Commission, and was appointed Treasurer in 1908. Although Murray, whose private correspondence with the Prime Minister triggered the call for a Royal Commission and whose deeply critical testimony was instrumental in the removal of the incumbent officials, was viewed with distrust and dislike by the local non-indigenous community, in 1908 he was appointed Lieutenant Governor. During the subsequent period of political infighting, Champion earned a reputation for quiet efficiency and integrity, earning the lasting trust of Murray, and in 1913 was appointed Government Secretary.

As Government Secretary, Champion was in effect the chief executive officer of the territory, responsible for day-to-day operation of an administration that was starved of funds, experiencing the upheaval of the transition from a remote British protectorate to an Australian territory increasingly occupied by ambitious immigrants eager to develop the agricultural and mineral resources of the region, and led by distracted and frequently absent principals embroiled in political infighting. Murray, for his part, was at best lukewarm about the Territory, describing Papua as "a beastly country-I cannot explain how I hate it." Murray was bored with desk work in Port Moresby, detested his political superiors in Australia (he referred to Atlee Hunt, the head of the Australian Department for External Affairs and Murray's boss within the civil service, as "a commonplace bounder, fat of both body and of brain"), and was frequently absent on long expeditions, leaving the details of his administration to Champion. During Murray's absences, Champion became the "acting" Lieutenant Governor, a role that he took on for periods totalling around four years during Murray's administration. As a consequence, Champion was active throughout the administration of the Territory, taking on the role of commissioner of lands, registrar of titles and public curator when circumstances required. He also took responsibility for the management of parks and gardens and planted many trees that still stand in Port Moresby and Konedobu. Despite being Government Secretary and a senior member of the Executive and Legislative councils, he would water trees and plants around the town after his working day.

Despite increasing tensions between the government and private sector over development and native rights, Champion found friends among both fellow government officers and members of the commercial community. He was twice elected president of the Papua Club, the meeting-place of leading businessmen and planters. As the head of the public service, Champion was frequently asked for advice in matters where a conflict of interest could arise between his role in the government and the small Port Moresby community, which he dealt with, as Hubert Leonard Murray later put it, "with machine-like impartiality." Impartiality was central to Champion's role as the head of the Magistracy and the Police, locally known as the "outside service", the departments that undertook the practical work of implementing what became known as the "Murray policy" of colonial administration. As the head of the civil service in a small community like Papua, Champion was always conscious of possible charges of nepotism or preference. While he helped his step-son find a position in the civil service on the grounds that he was a returned serviceman and thus eligible for preferential treatment, Champion rejected his own sons' applications for government appointments. Disappointed that he could not join the service in Papua, his eldest son Ivan took a job with the Union Bank in Sydney. It was not until a chance meeting in Sydney with Hubert Murray, which led to the Lieutenant-Governor's direct intervention on his behalf, that Ivan was able to join the government service as a patrol officer. Even after they had joined the administration, throughout their many years of active and distinguished service in Papua, Champion scrupulously avoided showing any favouritism to his sons.

Florence died in 1924, leaving Champion a widow at the age of 44. Two years later, Champion married Haidee Wallace, the sister of the newly arrived government surgeon, Victor Wallace. The couple had two daughters, Jan and Margaret. In 1934, in recognition of his public service, Champion was awarded a CBE. Murray noted in a private letter in February 1934 that "Champion has got a CBE. He ought to have got something much better, and in fact the Minister tried to get him a CMG." Such disappointments continued for the Government Secretary. When Murray died of lymphatic leukaemia in February 1940, Champion was appointed Acting Lieutenant Governor. After some months of deliberation, the Australian Government decided to eliminate the office, downgrading it to that of Administrator. In December 1940, Hubert Murray's nephew, Hubert Leonard Murray, was appointed to the new post. Champion was bitterly disappointed with the decision and wished to resign but was ultimately convinced to stay on.

However, after Australia's entry into World War II and military preparations in Papua against an expected Japanese invasion, it became clear that the days of the civilian administration were numbered. After Port Moresby was bombed for the second time on 5 February 1942, the Australian cabinet decided that civil administration would be suspended. The formal declaration of military rule on 14 February followed a period of confusion and unhappiness as the civilian government attempted to retain control of a region increasingly dominated by the military. Hubert Leonard Murray, Champion and other senior government officers left the country the day after the proclamation was issued, 'like whipped dogs’ as Champion later described. The abrupt end to Champion's 41 year career, which he sometimes called 'a long nightmare', was a source of enduring bitterness to a man who had devoted his life to the territory. As he later recollected, Champion had arrived in Port Moresby with one suitcase and had left with one suitcase forty-four years later. Over this time, he had built a significant collection of books and notes, all of which was lost during the war.

After leaving Papua in 1942, Champion settled with his wife and two daughters in Chatswood, New South Wales. He died at home at the age of 91, on 12 May 1972.

== Legacy ==
Champion Parade, which runs around the waterfront of Port Moresby harbour, was named in his honour. The tennis courts near Ela Beach were established by Champion before World War I, while he also planted and cared for a great number of the trees still standing in the city centre and at Konedobu, as well as the casuarina avenue on Ela Beach and the few mango trees that remain in Hunter Street.

Government offices
Preceded by David Ballantine	Treasurer of Papua; 1908–1913	Succeeded by Robert William Turner Kendrick
Preceded by Alexander Malcolm Campbell	Government Secretary of Papua; 1913–1942	Vacant Civilian government suspended
Preceded by Hubert Murray	Lieutenant-Governor of Papua, acting 1940	Succeeded by Hubert Leonard Murray (Administrator)
