= Jack Hides =

Jack Hides

Jack Gordon Hides (24 June 1906 – 19 June 1938) was an explorer of the then-Australian-controlled territories of Papua and New Guinea, now modern Papua New Guinea. He served as a Patrol Officer from 1931 to 1936, and led several expeditions in the early 1930s.

== Life ==
He was born in Port Moresby, the son of the head gaoler of the Port Moresby Gaol. He received a limited education at schools in Port Moresby and Queensland. He was a good swimmer, sprinter, and amateur boxer. In 1932 he married in Australia and later became the father of two children.

His first work in the Papuan public service was in July 1925, and in May 1926 he transferred to a cadet patrol officer. In February 1928 he became a Patrol Officer, and in 1934 became Assistant Resident Magistrate, 2nd grade, serving at various bases until 1936. His work in 1931–1932 leading patrols from Kerema into the partially unexplored Kukukuku country demonstrated considerable leadership skills. In temperament he was bold and courageous, although he has received criticism that some of the loss of life during his missions could have been avoided by more careful planning or caution. He also began to write books about his explorations, mainly based on his diaries, which were successful.

=== 1935 expedition ===
In 1935 he was chosen by Lieutenant-Governor Hubert Murray to lead an expedition into the unexplored Great Papuan Plateau between the Strickland and Purari Rivers, with Louis James O'Malley as his second-in-command, along with 10 police and 28 carriers. It was the last major exploratory mission in the territory without radio or aerial support. They left Daru, on the south coast, by water on 1 January, followed the Strickland River and then its tributary the Rentoul River by canoe, leaving their boats about five miles below the confluence of the eastern and western branches of the river. From there they continued by foot along the south side of the river, travelling several days without seeing any people or signs of habitation. Then they camped at the confluence of the Sioa and Rentoul river, in view of three longhouses on the opposite side of the valley, and their inhabitants, who seemed to take no notice of the explorers. The next morning, Hides was threatened by a party of natives who had crossed the river in the night.

Hides was able to escape, but continued to meet unfriendly natives, and was forced to fight in total at least nine skirmishes during the patrol, and shot at least 32 tribesmen – often in defence, sometimes due to misinterpretations (see below). An inquiry into the patrol was rapidly carried out by Kikori resident magistrate Dickie Humphries, largely vindicating the killings as necessary for self-defence. Hides received some criticism for the bloodshed, especially after another patrol was launched in the same area the next year (led by Ivan Champion and C.J. Adamson) with no resulting deaths, but he nonetheless was praised by Hubert Murray, who called his patrol "the most difficult and dangerous" ever carried out in Papua. When he appeared in Sydney in August, he proved himself an articulate speaker and received considerable attention.

The violence which marked his expedition has been attributed to several causes. Hides' group suffered from severe food shortages, and indigenous communities he encountered were often unwilling or unable to trade. Hides had bargained on trading steel tools for food, but found people who were not interested in steel. In addition, the Nembi people were suffering from acute food shortages themselves, and had none to spare. It has been suggested that the Etoro and Onabasulu people "did not sell food to the patrol because they feared it and wanted it to go away". By necessity, Hides' expedition resorted to stealing food, which led to violence. Another factor was Hides' ignorance of these uncontacted peoples' "fragmented political organisation", and of the "social and political implications of the patrol's movement"; he often appeared, from Papuans' perspectives, to be coming from enemy territory, making people instantly wary. Some Papuan peoples greeted the patrol hospitably, however. Among these were the Kewa. By the time the expedition reached Kewa territory, Hides was severely ill, exhausted and famished. "His by now exaggerated expectations of native treachery and attack and the desperate condition of the patrol led him to misperceive the Kewa's intent and allowed his patrol to open fire on them on two occasions, resulting in seven or eight Kewa deaths."

=== Final expedition and death ===
He had discovered some gold in the upper reaches of the Strickland River, and in 1936 he resigned from the Papuan public service to lead a private gold prospecting expedition up the river in February 1937, with the backing of investors in Sydney. His companion David Lyall became seriously ill on the journey, and they were forced to retreat to the coast, where Lyall died in September. He also lost a number of carriers from beriberi. Depressed by the experience, he returned to Sydney, where he died the following year from pneumonia.

== Writings ==
=== Books ===
- Through Wildest Papua. London: Blackie and Son, 1935
- Papuan Wonderland. London: Blackie and Son, 1936
- Savage Patrol. New York: National Travel Club, 1936
- Savages in Serge. Sydney: Angus and Robertson, 1938
- Beyond the Kubea Sydney: Angus and Robertson, 1939

=== Magazines ===
- Pacific Islands Monthly 4:10, 1934 (cover photograph)
- "A Great Feast at Evesi." The Papuan Villager 6:1, 1934
- "A Papuan Patrol." The Australian Geographer 2:8, 1935
- "They Collect Heads!" Pacific Islands Monthly 6:7, 1936 (cover photograph)
