= Dickie Humphries =

- Born: Walter Richard Humphries c. 16 October 1890
- Died: 21 January 1951 (aged 60); Higaturu, Territory of Papua and New Guinea
- Spouse(s): Ethel Puxley (m. 1919; died 1927) Myra Hain (m. 1932)

Walter Richard "Dickie" Humphries (16 October 1890 – 21 January 1951) was a kiap (patrol officer) and administrator in what is now Papua New Guinea. He joined the civil service of the Territory of Papua in 1912 and eventually became director of native labour in the Territory of Papua and New Guinea, until his death in the 1951 eruption of Mount Lamington.

== Early life ==
Details of Humphries' early years are uncertain. According to his entry in the Australian Dictionary of Biography, he was probably born on 16 October 1890, the son of stockbroker Henry Horan Humphries. He was born either in London or in Parow, South Africa. The Bulletin reported in 1920 that he was a "New South Wales boy" who had served articles of clerkship with a solicitor in Casino, New South Wales.

== Papua ==
In 1912, Humphries was appointed as a patrol officer in the civil service of Papua, an Australian external territory covering the south-east quarter of New Guinea. He was involved in numerous expeditions – known as "patrols" – in the New Guinea Highlands. He was stationed on the goldfields at Lakekamu from 1916 to 1917 and took part in a major overland patrol from Lakekamu to Ioma, through the territory of the Kukukuku people. He later spent periods at Misima Island and Abau and served as resident magistrate for the Central, Delta, Gulf and Northern divisions.

Humphries was resident magistrate at Kikori in 1935 when Jack Hides' Strickland-Purari Patrol returned, having shot dead at least 30 Papuans across various skirmishes during the patrol. He conducted an inquiry into the patrol, which largely vindicated the killings as necessary for self-defence.

During World War II, Humphries was appointed as a captain in the Citizen Military Forces and posted to the Australian New Guinea Administrative Unit, which had replaced the civilian administration of Papua. In May 1943 he presided over the trials at Higaturu of Orokaiva civilians accused of collaboration with the Japanese. A total of 22 men were subsequently publicly executed by hanging, although it has been suggested that there was no legal basis for their trial under military law. Humphries was later given responsibility for the military radio station in Port Moresby. He was promoted to major in May 1944 and was transferred to the reserve of officers in July 1945.

Humphries acted as director of native labour when the civilian administration was established after the war's end. He was an advocate for the abolition of indentured labour under the "recruiter's licence" system, describing it as a "monstrous thing". In 1950, Humphries he was confirmed as director of native labour in the Territory of Papua and New Guinea, the merged administrative entity. He was an ex officio member of the territory's executive council, a position he had previously filled from 1941 to 1942.

=== Writing ===
In 1923, Humphries published Patrolling in Papua through T. Fisher Unwin in London, an account of his expeditions and territorial administration. It included a series of photographs of the 1923 Joyce expedition to Mount Chapman in the Owen Stanley Range, mostly taken by Harry Downing. Humphries was one of the first patrol officers to make widespread use of photography and assisted professional photographer Frank Hurley on one of his expeditions Papua. He took a number of photographs of his own on a 1925 patrol of the Mount Albert Edward area.

Humphries was a regular contributor to Papuan newspapers, including the Papuan Courier, writing accounts of his patrols as well as humour pieces and poetry. He also compiled vocabularies of Papuan languages.

== Personal life ==
In 1919, Humphries married Ethel Puxley, with whom he had two daughters. His first wife died in 1927 of blackwater fever and in 1932 he remarried to Myra Hain.

Humphries was killed at Higaturu on 21 January 1951 in the 1951 eruption of Mount Lamington. His body was unable to be recovered. He was on recreation leave visiting his daughter Letty and son-in-law Maynard Locke, who worked as an education officer; they and their two daughters were also killed in the eruption.
