= Colon (letter) =

Letter used in some languages for vowel length or tone

- ꞉

Usage
- Writing system: Latin
- Type: alphabetic
- Language of origin: Americanist phonetic notation, Erima, Gizra, Go꞉bosi, Gwahatike, Kaluli, Kamula, Kasua, Kuni-Boazi, Zimakani, Budu, Sabaot, Grebo, Oʼodham, Zuni, Hupa, Sayula Popoluca, Mohawk
- Sound values: [ː]
- In Unicode: U+A789

The colon alphabetic letter ꞉ is used in a number of languages and phonetic transcription systems, for vowel length in Americanist Phonetic Notation, for the vowels ⟨a꞉⟩ [ɛ] and ⟨o꞉⟩ [ɔ] in a number of languages of Papua New Guinea, and for grammatical tone in several languages of Africa. It resembles but differs from the colon punctuation mark, :. In some fonts, the two dots are placed a bit closer together than those of the punctuation colon so that the two characters are visually distinct. In Unicode it has been assigned the code U+A789 ꞉ MODIFIER LETTER COLON, which behaves like a letter rather than a punctuation mark in electronic texts. In practice, however, an ASCII colon is frequently used for the letter (U+003A : COLON).

In Windows and macOS, the letter colon can be used to emulate the punctuation colon in file names, where the punctuation colon is a reserved character that cannot be used.

== Alphabetic letter ==
Several of the Native American languages of North America use the colon (U+003A : COLON) to indicate vowel length. Zuni is one. Other languages include Hupa of California, Oʼodham of Arizona, Sayula Popoluca of Mexico and Mohawk of Ontario. Still others use a half colon (just the top dot of the colon, or a middot, U+00B7 · MIDDLE DOT, not to be confused with U+A78F ꞏ LATIN LETTER SINOLOGICAL DOT or other dot characters). Both conventions derive from Americanist phonetic notation (below).

The letter colon (U+A789 ꞉ MODIFIER LETTER COLON) distinct from and generally smaller than the punctuation colon, is used as a grammatical tone letter in Budu in the Democratic Republic of the Congo, in Sabaot in Kenya, and in some Grebo in Liberia. It is also used in several languages of Papua New Guinea: Erima, Gizra, Go꞉bosi, Gwahatike, Kaluli, Kamula, Kasua, Kuni-Boazi and Zimakani.

In Erima, the letter colon is used before a vowel letter a or u to indicate nasalization, for example h꞉aambi "yam", ꞉uwai "a bee".

In Gizra, the letter colon is used in the digraph u꞉ /ɨ/ distinct from the letter u /u/. The digraph doesn’t often occur at the end of words, but is still distinct from a word ending with u followed by the punctuation colon.

In Go꞉bosi, the letter colon is used as a diacritic to distinguish o꞉ /o/ from o /ɔ/.

In Kaluli, the letter colon is used as a diacritic to distinguish a꞉ /ɛ/ from a /a/, and o꞉ /ɔ/ from o /o/.

In Kamula, the letter colon is used as a diacritic to distinguish a꞉ /ɛ/ from a /a/.

In Kasua, the letter colon is used as a diacritic to distinguish a꞉ /æ/ from a /ɑ/.

In Kuni-Boazi the letter colon is used after a vowel letter to indicate grammatical vowel lengthening, for example gemanqatam "when he talked" and ge꞉manqatam "when he talked about it"..

== Phonetic symbol ==
ːˑo

IPA length mark
- In Unicode: U+02D0 ː MODIFIER LETTER TRIANGULAR COLON; U+02D1 ˑ MODIFIER LETTER HALF TRIANGULAR COLON

Different from
- Different from: U+003A : COLON

In the International Phonetic Alphabet, a triangular or trapezoidal colon-like letter is used to indicate that the preceding consonant or vowel is long. Its form is that of two triangles or trapezoids pointing toward each other rather than the two dots of Americanist notation. It is available in Unicode as U+02D0 ː MODIFIER LETTER TRIANGULAR COLON. If the upper triangle is used without the lower one (U+02D1 ˑ MODIFIER LETTER HALF TRIANGULAR COLON), it designates a half-long vowel or consonant.

In Americanist phonetic notation, a colon may be used to indicate vowel length. This convention is somewhat less common than the half-colon.

The Uralic Phonetic Alphabet uses U+02F8 ˸ MODIFIER LETTER RAISED COLON.
