= Etoro =

Etoro may refer to:

- Etoro people, a tribe of Papua New Guinea
  - Edolo language, their language
- eToro, a multi-asset investment company
