= Aimele language =

Bosavi language spoken in Papua New Guinea

Aimele
- Kware
- Native to: Papua New Guinea
- Region: Lake Campbell, Western Province
- Native speakers: 300 (2016)
- Language family: Trans–New Guinea: Bosavi; Aimele

Language codes
- ISO 639-3: ail
- Glottolog: aime1238
- ELP: Aimele

Aimele is a Papuan language of Papua New Guinea. It has around 300 speakers, living primarily in Lake Campbell in Western Province, where it is the dominant language of the community.

== Names ==
The alternate names for Aimele are Eibela and Kware.

== Phonology ==
Aimele has 28 phonemes in total, with a consonantal inventory of 13 phonemes, and a vowel inventory of 14 phonemes when including diphthongs and lengthened vowels, or 5 without.

=== Consonants ===
The consonantal system is very similar to the ones found in the neighboring languages Kasua, Kaluli, Kamula and Odoodee.

		Bilabial	Alveolar	Palatal	Velar	Glottal
Nasal		m	n			
Plosive	voiceless		t		k	
Plosive	voiced	b	d		ɡ	
Fricative		ɸ	s			h
Approximant		w	l	j		

=== Vowels ===
	Short		Long	
	Front	Back	Front	Back
Close	i	u	iː	uː
Mid	ɛ	o	ɛ:	oː
Open	a		aː	
Diphthongs	ai, oi, ou, ɛi			
