= Karius (disambiguation) =

Karius most often refers to Loris Karius, a German professional footballer.

Karius may also refer to:

== People ==
- Charles Karius (1893–1940), Australian explorer and magistrate
- Wolfgang Karius (born 1943), German conductor and organist

== Arts, entertainment and media ==
=== Literature ===
- Karius and Bactus, Norwegian children's novel by Thorbjørn Egner
