= Kaluli language =

Language

Kaluli
- Bosavi
- Bosavi languages (red), among other Papua New Guinea languages
- Region: Papua New Guinea
- Ethnicity: Kaluli
- Native speakers: 3,100 (2015)
- Language family: Trans–New Guinea: Bosavi; Kaluli–Kasua; Kaluli
- Writing system: Latin

Language codes
- ISO 639-3: bco Kaluli
- Glottolog: kalu1248

Kaluli is a language spoken in Papua New Guinea. It is a developing language with 3,100 speakers. Some people refer to this language as Bosavi, however the people themselves refer to the language as Kaluli. There are four dialects, Ologo, Kaluli, Walulu, and Kugenesi. The differences between the dialects are not clear. Their writing system uses the Latin script. Kaluli belongs to the Trans-New Guinea language family. Kaluli was first analyzed by Murray Rule in 1964 who wrote a preliminary phonological and morphological analysis. A dictionary of Kaluli has been compiled by Schieffelin and Feld (1998).

== Classification ==
Like most Trans New Guinea languages, Kaluli is verb-final, as Subject-Object-Verb (SOV). The unmarked word order for bivalent clauses is AOV, but OAV is also possible. Kaluli allows a great deal of deletion and ellipsis in all genres of talk. Utterances may consist of a single verb, or a verb with one or more other sentence constituents. When a person opens a discourse all major NPs (Numeral Phrase) are usually specified, but if one NP does not change, and there is no likelihood of ambiguity, that NP will probably not be repeated.

Examples of inflected Kaluli verbs, showing different stem forms
	Immediate imperative	Future imperative	Future (first person)	Past
'take'	di-ma	di-ya꞉bi	di-a꞉no꞉	di
'speak'	sa-ma	sa꞉l-a꞉bi	sa꞉-ma꞉no꞉	siyo꞉
'eat'	maya	na꞉bi	ma꞉no꞉	mo꞉no꞉

- Aimele (140 speakers in 2000)
- Beami (4200 speakers in 1981)
- Dibiyaso (1950 speakers in 2000)
- Edolo (1670 speakers in 2000)
- Kasua (600 speakers in 1990)
- Onobasulu (1000 speakers in 2010)
- Sonia (400 speakers in 1993)
- Turumsa (5 speakers in 2002)

== Typology ==
The Kaluli tense system appears to show properties of both egophoricity and more typical person-marking. Present tense apparently distinguishes first vs non-first subjects, whereas future tense markers follow a more typically egophoric distribution. This suggests that language can include both indexical speaker reference and personal knowledge marking into their verbal morphology, rather than choosing to focus on one path or the other. The Kaluli data shows much more intriguing variation on egophoricity, the special marking of second-person questions, as well as highlighting parallels between volition-sensitive egophoric marking and impersonal experiencer constructions in person-marking languages.

== History and culture ==
The Kaluli are more closely related to the low land Papuan cultural groups than to those of the nearby highlands, physiological and cultural evidence shows this but there is no hard evidence to suggest that they originated anywhere outside of the general territory that they currently occupy. Early trade relations and cultural borrowings appear to have been mainly with peoples from the north and from the west. Over time, the Kaluli moved eastward, away from established settlement areas, moving even more deeply into the forests. Some of this movement may be attributed to a need to seek fresh garden lands, but it may also be explained in part as a defensive response to the expansionist pressures of the Beami and Edolo, traditional Kaluli enemies who live to the west and northwest of Kaluli territory. Warfare and raiding were common on the plateau, but there were longstanding trade relations between the Kaluli and certain of the other neighbor groups, particularly with the Sonia to the west and the Huli of the Papuan highlands. First European contact on the plateau occurred in 1935, bringing with it the introduction of new goods to the regional trade network, most significantly, steel axes and knives. World War II brought a temporary stop to Australian government exploration of the plateau, which only began in 1953. At this time, there was more frequent, but still irregular, contacts with Australian administrators and more direct interventions into the lives of the plateau peoples. Raiding and cannibalism were outlawed by 1960, and in 1964 missionaries built an airstrip near Kaluli territory to serve two mission stations established nearby.

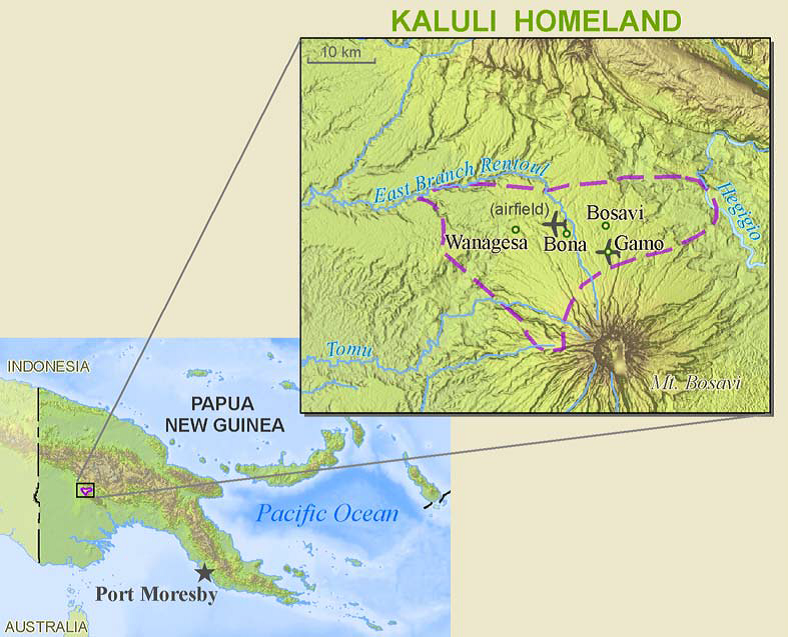
Kaluli Homeland

== Phonology ==
=== Vowels ===
Based on the properties of the present consonant and vowel inventories, Kaluli is a typologically typical language. It features a traditional seven vowel system, with a vowel height and rounding contrast.

Vowel Inventory
	Front	Central	Back
Close	i		u
Close-mid	e		o
Open-mid	ɛ		ɔ
Open		a	

Vowels
/i/ /ifi/ /i.lito/	[i] [i'fi] ['i.li,do]	'tree' 'fingernail' 'suitable'
/e/ /e.la/ /pesejap/	[e] ['e.la] [be,se'jap`]	'plant' 'womb' 'beat sago'
/ε/ /ε.lεtεgε/ /εmε.lε/	[ε] [ε.lεtε'gε] ['ε,mε.lε]	'yes' 'therefore' 'return'
/a/ /anaso/ /aka/	[a] ['a,naso] [a'ga]	'house' 'old' 'cuscus'
/ɔ/ /pɔmɔnɔ/ /ɔfɔf/	[ɔ] ['bɔmɔ,nɔ] [ɔ'fɔf]	'tree knot' 'intestine' 'wall'
/o/ /fon/ / o.lo.lo /	[o] [fon] ['oɭo,ɭo]	'eight' 'fur' 'down'
/u/ /tufε/ /fukis/	[u] [du'fε] [fu'gis]	'stone' 'ceiling joist' 'grass'

=== Consonants ===
Similar to its vowels, Kaluli's consonant inventory follows several common generalizations about consonants in the world’s languages. For example, the consonant chart lists only voiceless obstruents, nasal consonants, and an overall larger inventory that includes a few complex consonants (ex: glottal consonants, alveolar lateral flap, voiced labio-velar approximant).

Consonants
	Labial	Dental	Alveolar	Palatal	Velar	Glottal
Nasal	m	n				
Plosive	p pʰ (b)	t tʰ (d)			k kʰ (ɡ)	
Fricative	f		s			h
Flap			ɺ			
Semivowel				j	w	

=== Nasalisation ===
All Kaluli vowels may be nasalised, although nasalisation occurs only on a small percentage of words in the language. Nasalisation does not appear to be predictable, but there is also no clear examples of contrast. Some speakers nasalise words a lot more than others. However, no distinct group of individuals have been identified for consistently using more nasalisation, for either age or geographic group. When a nasalised vowel precedes a [b d g], most speakers pre-nasalise the stop in continuous speech, e.g. /tapo/ ‘all’ is pronounced as [ˡtʰ ɑ̃^mbo], /atep/ ‘two’ as [ãⁿ depʼ] and /wakapi/ ‘angry’ as [wãⁿˡ gabi]. Some speakers maintain the nasalisation on the vowel along with the prenasalised stop, whereas other speakers use an oral vowel with the prenasalised stop. If, however, these words are broken into their component syllables, then the pre-nasalisation disappears, and the nasal vowel remains.

== Orthography ==
The Kaluli orthography uses seven vowel letters. The open-mid vowels are represented by ⟨a꞉⟩ and ⟨o꞉⟩. Kaluli does have tone and nasalization that is not symbolized in the orthography as it is presently used. Verbal morphology in Kaluli is very complicated, and there has been little standardization of rules concerning the writing of these morphological changes.

== See also ==
- Kaluli creation myth
- Mount Bosavi
- LGBT rights in Papua New Guinea
