= Steven Feld =

American ethnomusicologist (born 1949)

- Born: August 20, 1949 (age 77); Philadelphia, Pennsylvania
- Known for: Study of poetics, emotion, song, and dialogical theories developed from work in Bosavi, Papua New Guinea
- Awards: Fellow of the American Academy of Arts and Sciences (1994), Charles Seeger lecturer, Society for Ethnomusicology (2009)
- Scientific career
- Fields: Anthropology, Linguistics, Ethnomusicology, Poetics
- Workplaces: University of New Mexico, University of Texas, Austin, University of California, Santa Cruz, New York University, University of Pennsylvania
- Thesis: (1979)
- Doctoral advisor: Alan P. Merriam
- Website: www.acousticecology.org/feld/

Steven Feld (born August 20, 1949) is an American ethnomusicologist, anthropologist, and linguist, who worked for many years with the Kaluli (Bosavi) people of Papua New Guinea. He earned a MacArthur Fellowship in 1991.

== Early life ==
Feld was born in Philadelphia, Pennsylvania, on August 20, 1949. He graduated with a BA cum laude at Hofstra University in anthropology in 1971.

He first went to the Bosavi territory in 1976, accompanied by anthropologist Edward L. Schieffelin, whose recordings of the Bosavi inspired him to pursue this work. His work there fulfilled his dissertation (later published as Sound and Sentiment) for his PhD from Indiana University in 1979 (in anthropology/linguistics/ethnomusicology).

== Career ==
Feld later returned several times in the 1980s and 1990s to Papua New Guinea to research Bosavi song, rainforest ecology, and cultural poetics. He has also made briefer research visits to various locations in Europe.

He has taught at Columbia University, New York University, University of California, Santa Cruz, University of Texas at Austin, and University of Pennsylvania. He is currently (since 2003) a professor of anthropology and music at the University of New Mexico. Since 2001, he has also held a visiting appointment at the Grieg Academy, University of Bergen, Norway, as a professor of world music.

In 2002, he founded the VoxLox label, "documentary sound art advocates for human rights and acoustic ecology." His most recent book Jazz Cosmopolitanism in Accra (2012) is based on five years of research and collaboration in Accra, Ghana.

He is also a musician, and he has been active in the New Mexican music scene since the 1970s.

Some of Feld's recordings are sampled on the track, "Kaluli Groove" on the 2007 album Global Drum Project by Mickey Hart, Zakir Hussain, Sikiru Adepoju, and Giovanni Hidalgo.

== Academic work ==
=== Schizophonic mimesis ===
Schizophonic mimesis is a term coined by Steven Feld that describes the separation of a sound from its source, and the recontextualizing of that sound into a separate sonic context. The term in and of itself describes how sound recordings, split from their source through the chain of audio production, circulation, and consumption, stimulate and license renegotiations of identity in an ethnomusicological perspective.

The term is composed of two parts: schizophonia and mimesis. Firstly, schizophonia, a term coined by Canadian composer R. Murray Schafer, refers to the split between an original sound and the reproduction/transmission of this sound, be it in a recording, a song, etc. For example, any sound recording, radio, and telephone is a machine of schizophonia, in that they all separate the sound from its original source; in the case of radio, the source of a New York radio show is from New York, but a listener in Los Angeles hears the noises from Los Angeles. Secondly, mimesis describes an imitation or representation of that separated sound into another context. For example, mimesis has occurred if one places a recording of a baby's gurgle into a song.

==== Notable examples ====
1. In 1969, ethnomusicologist Hugo Zemp recorded a Solomon Island woman named Afunakwa singing a popular Solomon Islands lullaby called "Rorogwela". Then, in 1992, on Deep Forest's album Boheme, a song called "Sweet Lullaby" samples Zemp's field recording of Rorogwela. Furthermore, in 1996, Norwegian saxophonist Jan Garbarek sampled the melody of "Rorogwela" in his song "Pygmy Lullaby" on his album Visible World. The field recording is an example of schizophonia, and the placing of this field recording into "Sweet Lullaby" is an instance of schizophonic mimesis. The sampling of the melody in "Pygmy Lullaby" demonstrates further schizophonic mimesis.
2. In 1966, ethnomusicologist Simha Arom recorded a particular style of music from the Ba-Benzélé Pygmies called hindewhu, which consists of making music with a single-pitch flute and the human voice. Soon after, Herbie Hancock adapted the hindewhu style by using a beer bottle instead of a flute (played by percussionist Bill Summers) in his 1973 remake of "Watermelon Man". Then, Madonna's song "Sanctuary" from the 1994 album Bedtime Stories sampled Hancock's adaptation of hindewhu. Again, the field recording is an example of schizophonia, and the use of the hindewhu style in Hancock's adaptation and "Sanctuary" are examples of schizophonic mimesis.

== Works ==
- Jazz Cosmopolitanism in Accra: Five Musical Years in Ghana. Duke University Press, 2012
- Sound and Sentiment: Birds, Weeping, Poetics, and Song in Kaluli expression. University of Pennsylvania Press, 1982, 2nd ed. 1990; based on dissertation
- (with Charles Keil) Music Grooves. University of Chicago Press, 1994
- (with Keith Basso, as eds.) Senses of Place. School of American Research Press, 1996
- (with Bambi B. Schieffelin and others) Bosavi-English-Tok Pisin Dictionary. Australian National University, Pacific Linguistics C-153, 1998
- (with Dick Blau, Charles Keil, and Angeliki V. Keil) Bright Balkan Morning: Romani Lives and the Power of Greek Music in Macedonia. Wesleyan University Press, 2002 Website ISBN 978-0-8195-6488-7
- (with Virginia Ryan) Exposures: A White Woman in West Africa Voxlox Publication, 2006
- (with Nicola Scaldaferri) When the trees resound - Collaborative Media Research on an Italian Festival, Nota, Udine, 2019

== Recordings ==
- Music of the Kaluli. Institute of Papua New Guinea Studies, 1981
- The Kaluli of Papua Nugini: Weeping and Song. Bärenreiter Musicaphon, 1985
- Voices of the Rainforest. Rykodisc, 1991
- Rainforest Soundwalks: Ambiences of Bosavi, Papua New Guinea. Earth Ear, 2001
- Bosavi: Rainforest Music from Papua New Guinea. Smithsonian Folkways, 2001
- Bells and Winter Festivals of Greek Macedonia. Smithsonian Folkways, 2002

=== For VoxLox ===
- The Time of Bells Vol. 1 & 2, 2004; Vol. 3 (with Nii Noi Nortey), 2005; Vol. 4, 2006
- Suikinkutsu: A Japanese Underground Water Zither, 2006
- The Castaways Project (with Virginia Ryan) 2006
- Topographies of The Dark:2007
