= Great Papuan Plateau =

- Physical map of New Guinea

Highest point
- Coordinates: 6°36′13″S 142°35′16″E

Geography

The Great Papuan Plateau is a karst plateau in the Southern Highlands, Hela and Western Provinces of Papua New Guinea. It is bordered the upper stretches of the Kikori River and the Strickland River on the east and west, respectively, and the Karius Range, the southern edge of the highlands, including Mount Sisa (2,650 m), to the north, and Mount Bosavi (2,507 m) to the south.

The eastern part of the plateau, east of the Sioa River, covers about 525 square miles (1,360 km^{2}) and had a sparse population of 2,100 people (1966 government census), speaking at least five different languages. The dominant ethnic groups of this region are the Bosavi, Hawalisi, and Onabasulu. Further to the west are the Etoro, Bedamuni, and Sonia. In general, these groups practice swidden agriculture with exploitation of taro.

The Great Papuan Plateau has petroleum resources, and a pipeline from the plateau to Daru is under construction.

The Great Papuan Plateau is included within the Kikori River Basin/Great Papuan Plateau included in 2006 on a tentative list of UNESCO World Heritage Sites, for its well-preserved natural systems and culturally significant sites.

== History ==
The original inhabitants of the area is unclear, because of a dearth of evidence. According to the Bosavi people, they have always inhabited the plateau. The relationship of the various ethnic groups and languages remains somewhat unclear.

The first Westerners to visit the Great Papuan Plateau were Australian colonial patrol officers Jack Hides and Jim O'Malley, who led a patrol from the Strickland River to the Purari River in 1934 and 1935. They approached up the Strickland and then the Rentoul River by canoe, leaving their boats about five miles (8 km) below the confluence of the eastern and western branches of the river. From there they continued by foot along the south side of the river, travelling several days without seeing any people or signs of habitation. Then they camped at the confluence of the Sioa and Rentoul river, in view of three longhouses on the opposite side of the valley, and their inhabitants, who seemed to take no notice of the explorers.

The next morning, Hides was threatened by a party of natives who had crossed the river in the night. He was able to escape, but continued to meet unfriendly natives, and was forced to open fire on a group ambushing him, killing one to three. Eventually the patrol passed north of the Karius Range.

In March 1936, Ivan Champion and Richard Archbold flew over the northern foothills of Mount Bosavi to plan an upcoming expedition from the Bamu River to the Purari. In response to this incident and the eventual expedition a few months later, the Bosavi people responded by fleeing their longhouses and camping in the forest.

In 1938 a government station was opened at Lake Kutubu for further exploration of the highlands. This facilitated trade of new materials from the east which the people of the plateau had not had with their established trading routes to the south. World War II delayed the planned exploration, and in the meantime a severe measles epidemic greatly reduced native populations, especially of Etoro and Onabasulu people. In 1953, a second administration patrol, led by C.D. Wren, came onto the plateau, escorting a team of petroleum geologists.

The first missionaries arrived in 1964. A Seventh-day Adventist who stayed with the Onabasulu people, until he was obliged to leave when the people found out the practice forbade the eating of pork. That same year, UFM International arrived in the Bosavi area to build an airstrip for a mission station, for which they recruited local workers.

== See also ==
- Papuan Plateau languages
