= Harry Moore Dauncey =

British missionary (1863–1932)

Rev. Harry Moore Dauncey (3 January 1863 - 16 January 1932) was a British missionary. He served with the London Missionary Society in Papua New Guinea from 1888 till his retirement in 1928.

== Early years ==
Harry Moore Dauncey was born on 3 January 1863 in Walsall, England. He was a member of the Congregational Church on Wednesbury Road, in that city. He studied at Cheshunt College.

== Career ==
Dauncey was appointed to New Guinea. Ordained on 2 July 1888 at Congregational Chapel, Wednesbury Road, Walsall. He left England on 24 July 1888, arriving at Port Moresby on 20 September 1888 and settled there. On 3 June 1893 he left Port Moresby to visit Sydney for a change and returned to New Guinea at the close of the year, settling at Delena, to which station he had been appointed.

On 16 August 1894, at Cooktown, Queensland, he married Mary Ellen Hinton, a church member of the Wesley Chapel, Walsall, who left England on 22 June 1894 and returned to Delena on 11 September 1894. In 1895, on account of the serious illness of the wife, Dauncey accompanied her to Cooktown, and thence continued to Gympie, near Brisbane, where he placed her under the care of friends. On 15 June, Mrs. Dauncey having improved in health, he left Gympie to return alone to Delena, where he arrived on 5 July. Mrs. Dauncey having, after a few weeks, partially recovered, went on to Sydney in order to proceed to New Guinea in the John Williams. Arriving in New Zealand, the serious illness of her child rendered it necessary for her to take the child back to Sydney, where, on 28 February 1896, he died.

Mr. Dauncey, hearing of the painful circumstances in which his wife was placed, leaving Delena, hastened to Sydney, where he arrived on 24 February. On 31 March the Daunceys left Sydney in the John Williams to return to New Guinea, and after attending the Annual District Committee Meeting at Kapakapa, in April, went on to Delena.

Dauncey encountered Alfred Cort Haddon in 1898 on Thursday Island, and at the time, they noted a shared appreciation of "sorcerer's kits". In 1901, Dauncey found approximately 10,000 skulls in dobu (men's houses) on Goaribari Island. He retired in 1928, and died on 16 January 1932 at Bournemouth.
