= Beami language =

Papuan language of Papua New Guinea

Beami
- Region: Papua New Guinea
- Ethnicity: Kaluli
- Native speakers: 5,000 (2006)
- Language family: Trans–New Guinea: Bosavi; Beami–Edolo; Beami

Language codes
- ISO 639-3: beo
- Glottolog: beam1240

Beami (Bedamini, Bedamuni, Mougulu) is a Papuan language of Papua New Guinea. Komofio is a dialect.

== Phonology ==
=== Consonants ===
		Labial	Alveolar	Palatal	Velar	Glottal
Nasal		m	n			
Plosive	voiceless	p	t		k	
Plosive	voiced	b	d		ɡ	
Fricative		f	s			h
Lateral			l			
Tap			ɺ			
Approximant		w		j		

=== Vowels ===
	Front	Central	Back
Close	i		u
Mid	e		ɔ
Open	a		

/a/ can also be heard as [æ].
