= Choerophryne allisoni =

Conservation status
- Data Deficient (IUCN 3.1)

Scientific classification
- Kingdom: Animalia
- Phylum: Chordata
- Class: Amphibia
- Order: Anura
- Family: Microhylidae
- Genus: Choerophryne
- Species: C. allisoni

Binomial name
- Choerophryne allisoni Richards and Burton, 2003
- Choerophryne allisoni is only known from Mount Sisa in the Southern Highlands Province, Papua New Guinea

Species of amphibian

Choerophryne allisoni is a tiny species of frog in the family Microhylidae. It is endemic to Papua New Guinea and only known from its type locality, Mount Sisa in the Southern Highlands Province. The specific name allisoni honours Allen Allison, an American herpetologist. Common name Allison's mountain frog has been coined for this species.

== Description ==
The type series consists of two adult males that measure 11.5–11.6 mm (0.5–0.5 in) in snout–vent length. The snout is projecting and moderately elongated. The tympanum is indistinct and poorly defined. The first finger is reduced, the other fingers have tips that are at most slightly expanded. The first toe is partly fused with the second. The toe tips are rounded or expanded into small discs. No digital webbing is present. The dorsum is dark brown with various darker or paler patterns; a pale mid-vertebral stripe is present.

The male advertisement call is a single, short "bleat" consisting of 5–6 notes. The call interval is about 5–7 seconds. The dominant frequency is 4220–4960 Hz.

== Habitat and conservation ==
The type series was collected from the transition zone between Nothofagus-dominated vegetation with a rather open understorey and a denser, higher-altitude moss forest at 2,000 m (6,600 ft) above sea level. The specimens were found calling from within leaf litter on the forest floor. Development is presumably direct (i.e., there is no free-living larval stage), as in other species in the genus.

Threats to this species are unknown. It is not known to occur in any protected areas.
