= Etoro people =

Tribe and ethnic group of Papua New Guinea

The Etoro, or Edolo, are a tribe and ethnic group of Papua New Guinea. Their territory comprises the southern slopes of Mt. Sisa, along the southern edge of the central mountain range of New Guinea, near the Papuan Plateau. They are well known among anthropologists because of ritual acts practiced between the young boys and men of the tribe. The Etoro believe that young males must ingest the semen of their elders to achieve adult male status and to properly mature and grow strong.

In 2009, the National Geographic Society reported an estimation that there were fewer than 1668 speakers of the Etoro/Edolo language.

== Marriage ==
O'Neil and Kottak agree that most men marry and have heterosexual relations with their wives. The fear that heterosexual sex causes them to die earlier and the belief that homosexual sex prolongs life means that heterosexual relations are focused towards reproduction.

== See also ==
- Baruya people
- Pedophilia
- Rite of passage
- Edolo language
- Sambia people
- Kaluli people
