= Goaribari Island =

Island in southern Papua New Guinea

Goaribari
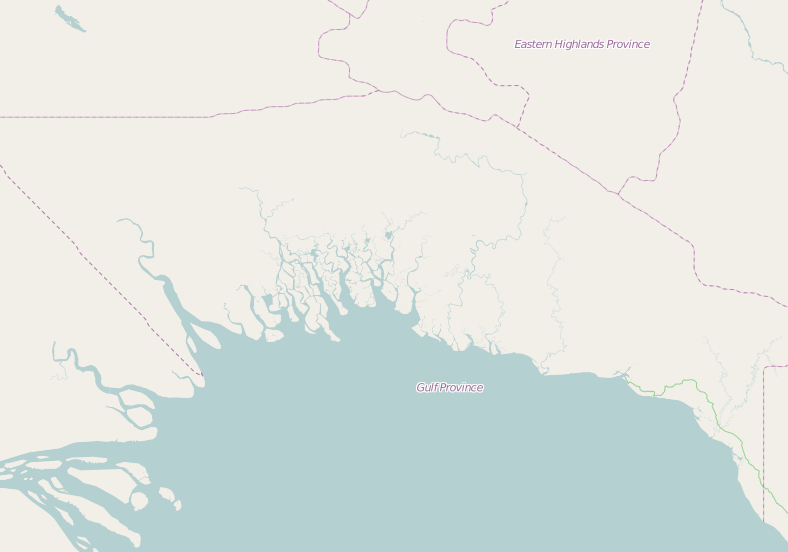
- Location within Gulf Province Location within Papua New Guinea

Geography
- Coordinates: 7°46.33′S 144°13.43′E
- Archipelago: New Guinea
- Area: 47.02 km^{2} (18.15 sq mi)
- Length: 9.4 km (5.84 mi)
- Width: 6.0 km (3.73 mi)
- Highest elevation: 1 m (3 ft)

Administration
- Papua New Guinea
- Province: Gulf Province
- LLG: West Kikori Rural LLG

Demographics
- Population: 100 (2000)
- Pop. density: 2.1/km^{2} (5.4/sq mi)
- Ethnic groups: Kerewo

Goaribari is an island in southern Papua New Guinea. It is located in Gulf Province within the Gulf of Papua. During high tides, parts of the island are inundated. The vegetation is thick rainforest.

Headhunting was evidenced by the discovery of thousands of skulls in village houses and the longhouse in the early 20th century. In 1901, two ministers and ten missionary students were murdered and cannibalized by island natives.

== Geography ==
Goaribari Island measures about 5.8 miles (9.3 km) in east–west direction. Risk Point is the eastern extreme and southward of it there is a sand bank, nearly dry at low water, which extends nearly 3 miles (4.8 km) off the southeast side of the island. The island is covered with tall mangroves.

The island is a formation at the delta of the Kikori and Omati Rivers. Its highest point is about 1 metre (3 ft 3 in) above sea level; it consists of mud formation, sedimentary in nature. During very high tides (king tides during storm events), parts of the island become inundated. This has caused some deltaic villages to be relocated to higher ground.

== History ==
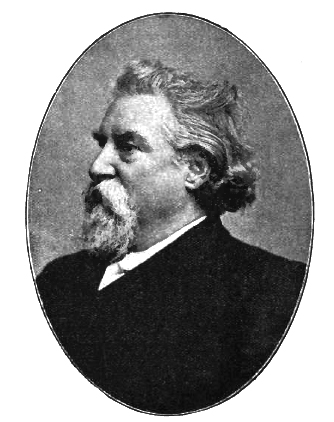
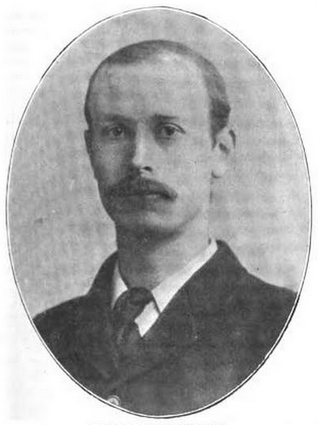
James Chalmers (left) and Oliver Tomkins (right), missionaries who were murdered on the island

On 8 April 1901, the Revs. James Chalmers and Oliver Fellows Tomkins (1873–1901), together with ten missionary students, were killed with stone implements and allegedly cannibalised by local First Nations peoples, at Dopima village when they attempted to evangelise and convert them; their bones were hung as trophies.

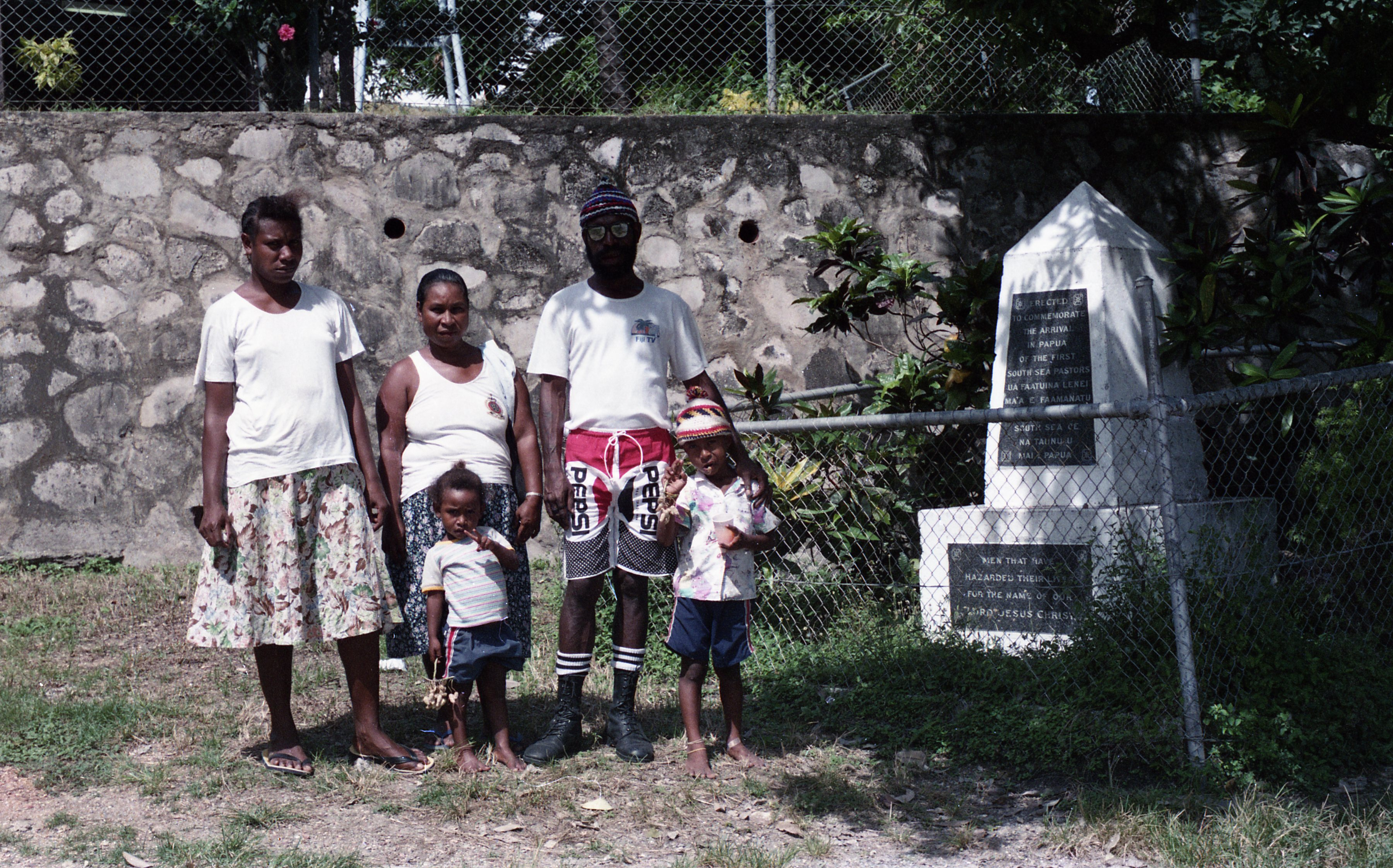
Memorial for James Chalmers

Following the massacre of the white missionaries, an Australian Royal Commission was called in 1904 to inquire into the scandal. This mission was led by Judge Christopher Stansfield Robinson. The object was to apprehend a native called Lake who was allegedly involved in the murders and who had refused to return the mortal remains of the missionaries for a Christian burial.

The mission also wanted to train a few natives as a police force to serve the island. A clash ensued between the natives who stormed the Australian ship Merrie England. The clash was implemented without forethought, turning violent. Guns were used on the natives. As many as eight were killed and many were injured. There were no major injuries to the Australians.

During this reprisal raid, missionary Rev. Harry Moore Dauncey reported that between 4 and 700 skulls were found in various village houses, and nearly 10,000 skulls were counted in the longhouse and burnt during this raid. The mission considered the natives to be savages as they greased their body for cover instead of wearing clothing. Professor Matthew R. Keller believes the commission viewed the population of the island as a different biological species. As a consequence of the villagers' massacre, Robinson shot himself and was replaced as Chief Judicial Officer by Hubert Murray.

=== 1924 floods ===
In 1924, floods and erosion of large tracts of coastal land resulted in the people of Kirawa village abandoning their homes and shifting to other villages in the Goaribari district. As a result, there are only two villages that remain on the island – Goare in the west (pop. 38) and Dopima in the east (pop. 62), which are also subject to frequent flooding. Some archaeological remains of Otoia village remain, while parts have been eroded by the Kikori River's delta channel. Pile dwellings are common as most of the land is barely above high water (of spring tides) which makes most of the island almost uninhabitable.

== Culture ==
The Kerewo people live in the northwestern region of the island. The language spoken by the people is linked to Kiwai. Their ethnic identity is similar to those of the Fly River delta. Men have worn pubic protection crafted from a Melo shell.

The Muguru ceremony that natives of the island conduct is similar to the one held by Kiwai people which is conducted at the club house decorated by dracaena leaves and a dracaena branch is stuck into the waist bands of the novices. When a skull is captured then also the dracaena is hung on the club house. On the top of the hill growth of crotons is noted.

== Flora ==
The wildlife is dominated by a tropical wet rainforest. Flora includes Nipa and coconut palms.

== Governance ==
Goaribari is part of West Kikori Rural LLG (Local Level Government) Area in Kikori District of Gulf Province.

== See also ==
- List of islands of Papua New Guinea

== Bibliography ==
- Great Britain. Hydrographic Dept (1908). Pacific Islands ... (Public domain ed.). Hydrographic office, Admiralty.
- Goldman, Laurence (1 January 1999). The Anthropology of Cannibalism. Greenwood Publishing Group. ISBN 978-0-89789-597-2.
- Haberle, Simon G. (1 January 2012). Peopled Landscapes: Archaeological and Biogeographic Approaches to Landscapes. ANU E Press. ISBN 978-1-921862-72-4.
- Keller, Matthew Raymond (2008). Re-drawing the Color Line: How National Commissions Explained Collective Violence in the 20th Century. ISBN 978-1-109-06165-9.
- Maiden, Peter (2003). Missionaries, Headhunters and Colonial Officers: British New Guinea and the Goaribari Affray 1860-1907. Rockhamption, Qld: Central Queensland University Press. ISBN 9781876780296. OCLC 614841210.
- McKinnon, Rowan; Carillet, Jean-Bernard; Starnes, Dean (2008). Papua New Guinea & Solomon Islands. Lonely Planet. ISBN 978-1-74104-580-2.
- Morrissey, Di (6 January 2012). Scatter the Stars. Macmillan Australia. ISBN 978-1-4668-1001-3.
- Neich, Roger; Pereira, Pandora Fulimalo (1 January 2004). Pacific Jewelry and Adornment. University of Hawai'i Press. ISBN 978-0-8248-2882-0.
- Riesenfeld, Alphonse (1950). The Megalithic Culture of Melanesia. Brill Archive. GGKEY:Z1UP2DH6D7D.
