= Sonia language =

Papuan language of Papua New Guinea

Sonia
- Region: Papua New Guinea
- Native speakers: (400 cited 1993)
- Language family: Trans–New Guinea: Bosavi; Sonia

Language codes
- ISO 639-3: siq
- Glottolog: soni1260

Sonia is a Papuan language of Papua New Guinea.
