= Territory of Papua =

Australian external territory from 1902 to 1975

- 1902–1975
- Flag (1906–1971) Badge (1906–1971)

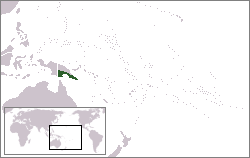
- Status: External territory of Australia
- Capital: Port Moresby
- Common languages: English (official), Tok Pisin, Hiri Motu (native lingua franca), many Austronesian languages, Papuan languages
- Monarch
  - 1902–1910: Edward VII
  - 1910–1936: George V
  - 1936: Edward VIII
  - 1936–1952: George VI
  - 1952–1975: Elizabeth II
- Lieutenant-Governor
- Legislature: Legislative Council

Establishment
  - Transfer of British New Guinea to Australia: 18 March 1902
  - Commencement of Papua Act 1905: 1 September 1906
  - Union with New Guinea: 1 July 1949
- Currency: Australian pound
Preceded by	Succeeded by
British New Guinea	1949: Territory of Papua and New Guinea; 1975: Papua New Guinea

The Territory of Papua was an Australian external territory comprising the south-eastern portion of the island of New Guinea. The Crown colony of British New Guinea was ceded to Australia in 1902 and formally organised as a separate territory in 1906. It was administratively merged with the Territory of New Guinea to the north in 1949 to form the Territory of Papua and New Guinea, which gained independence as Papua New Guinea in 1975.

== History ==
=== Background ===
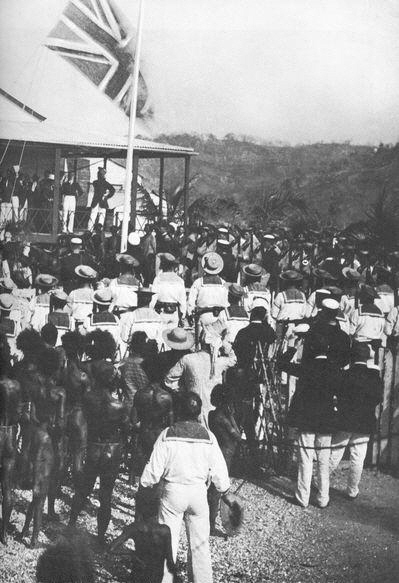
The British flag being raised in 1883 after the Colony of Queensland annexed the southern part of New Guinea

In November 1882, Allgemeine Zeitung published an article calling for the German annexation of New Guinea. Concerned with such a prospect, Sir Thomas McIlwraith, the Premier of Queensland, cabled to London in February 1883, urging the government to annex New Guinea to Queensland, but received no answer. On 20 March, hearing the story that SMS Carola was about to leave Sydney for the South Seas "with object of annexation", he telegraphed Henry Chester, the police magistrate at Thursday Island, to sail for New Guinea and "take formal possession in Her Majesty's name of whole of the Island with exception of that portion in occupation of the Dutch". Chester made the proclamation at Port Moresby on 4 April, but the imperial British government disapproved of the annexation: the British Colonial Secretary Lord Derby emphasised in a despatch to the Queensland government that such an action was beyond Queensland's constitutional powers as a British colony.

On 6 November 1884, after the Australian colonies had promised financial support, the territory became a British protectorate. On 4 September 1888 the protectorate was annexed by Britain, together with some adjacent islands, which were collectively named British New Guinea.

=== Australian acquisition and "interregnum" period ===
On 18 March 1902, King Edward VII issued letters patent placing "our possession of British New Guinea under the authority of the Commonwealth of Australia" and authorising the governor-general of Australia to exercise all authority previously held by the governor of Queensland until the Parliament of Australia provided otherwise. The Territory of Papua was not formally constituted until 1 September 1906, when the provisions of the Papua Act 1905 came into effect pursuant to section 122 of the constitution. This four-year gap has been described as an interregnum, where Papua was under Australian sovereignty – holding a status similar to an unorganised U.S. territory – but the existing institutions of government of British New Guinea largely continued in place.

There were several reasons for the delay in the Australian parliament passing legislation to organise the territory, including interruptions from changes of government and elections, the need to make administrative arrangements, and debates over intended government policy in the territory. The Barton government began preparation of legislation in February 1903 and presented a draft bill in July 1903, intending for its provisions to come into effect on 1 January 1904. However, the initial draft was abandoned shortly before the 1903 federal election. A major sticking point in parliament was the attempt of temperance advocates to impose universal prohibition of alcohol in the territory. The Papua Act 1905 was eventually passed in November 1905, with the Deakin government compromising by introducing a local option for liquor licences and prohibiting the sale of alcohol to natives.

In June 1903, the Australian government appointed Christopher Stansfield Robinson as acting administrator of the territory. Robinson led a punitive expedition to Goaribari Island in March 1904, seeking to recover the bodies of missionaries James Chalmers and Oliver Fellows Tomkins, who had been murdered in 1901, and punish the perpetrators. Several Papuans were shot dead by the expedition, which received considerable attention in Australia after local missionary Charles Abel wrote to the press alleging a massacre had occurred. The Australian government called a royal commission in response to the allegations, which led to Robinson's suicide. A further royal commission was called in 1906 following allegations of administrative misconduct, the report of which "recommended the immediate removal of most senior officials of the colony including the administrator who had asked for the enquiry" and led to the appointment of Hubert Murray as lieutenant-governor, who would remain in office until 1940.

=== Early administration and World War I ===
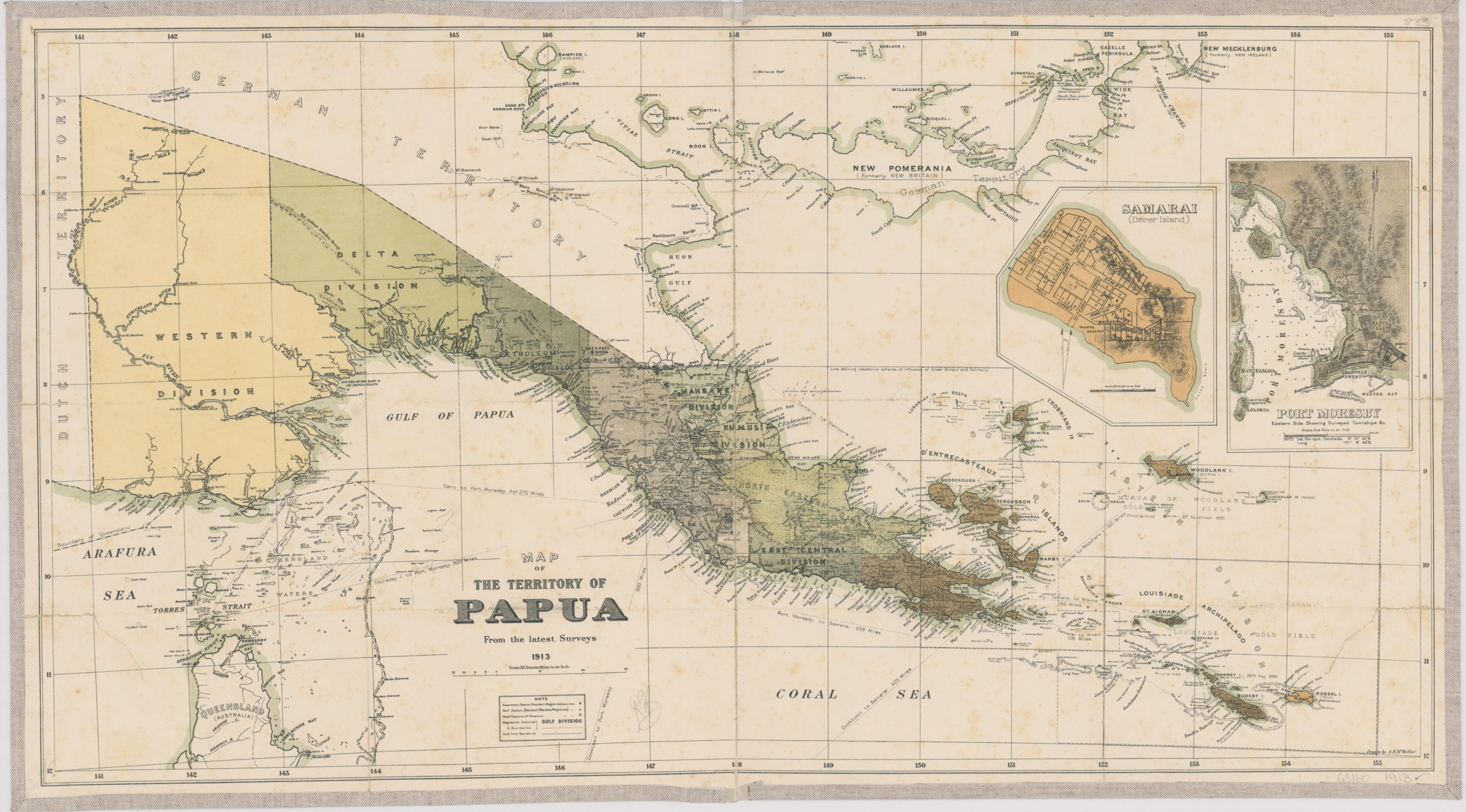
Australian map of Papua, 1913

Meanwhile, the northern part of New Guinea was under German commercial control from 1884, and from 1899 was directly ruled by the German government as the colony of German New Guinea, then known as Kaiser-Wilhelmsland. At the outbreak of the First World War in 1914, Australia invaded Kaiser-Wilhelmsland on 11 September 1914 with 2000 volunteers of the Australian Naval and Military Expeditionary Force. After several skirmishes, the Australians succeeded in capturing the German colony, which they occupied for the rest of the war. The Treaty of Versailles in 1919 transferred German New Guinea to Australia, which administered it as the Territory of New Guinea.

=== World War II ===
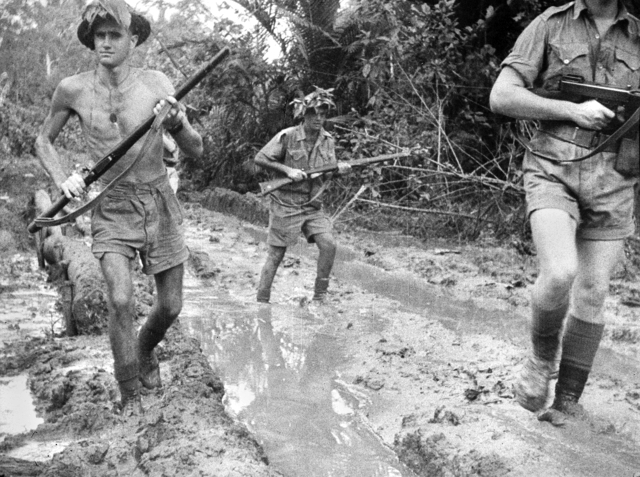
Australian troops at Milne Bay, Papua. The Australian army was the first to inflict defeat on the Imperial Japanese Army during World War II at the Battle of Milne Bay of August–September 1942.

Shortly after the start of the Pacific War, the island of New Guinea was invaded by the Japanese. Papua was the least affected region. Most of West Papua, at that time known as Dutch New Guinea, was occupied, as were large parts of the Territory of New Guinea (the former German New Guinea, which was also under Australian rule after World War I), but Papua was protected to a large extent by its southern location and the near-impassable Owen Stanley Ranges to the north. Civil administration was suspended during the war and both territories (Papua and New Guinea) were placed under martial law for the duration.

The New Guinea campaign opened with the battles for New Britain and New Ireland in the Territory of New Guinea in 1942. Rabaul, the capital of the Territory, was overwhelmed on 22–23 January and was established as a major Japanese base from where the Japanese landed on mainland New Guinea and advanced towards Port Moresby and Australia. Having had their initial effort to capture Port Moresby by a seaborne invasion disrupted by the U.S. Navy and Australian navy in the Battle of the Coral Sea, the Japanese attempted a landward attack from the north via the Kokoda Track. From July 1942, a few Australian reserve battalions, many of them very young and untrained, fought a stubborn rearguard action against the Japanese attack, over the rugged Owen Stanley Ranges. The militia, worn out and severely depleted by casualties, held out with the assistance of Papuan porters and medical assistants, and were relieved in late August by regular troops from the Second Australian Imperial Force, returning from action in the Mediterranean Theatre.

In early September 1942 Japanese marines attacked a strategic Royal Australian Air Force base at Milne Bay, near the eastern tip of Papua. They were beaten back by the Australian Army, and the Battle of Milne Bay was the first outright defeat of Japanese land forces in the Pacific theater during World War II. The offensives in Papua and New Guinea of 1943–44 were the single largest series of connected operations ever mounted by the Australian armed forces. The Supreme Commander of operations was the United States General Douglas Macarthur, with Australian General Thomas Blamey taking a direct role in planning, and operations being essentially directed by staff at New Guinea Force headquarters in Port Moresby. Bitter fighting continued in New Guinea between the largely Australian force and the Japanese 18th Army based in New Guinea until the Japanese surrender in 1945.

=== Administrative unification with New Guinea ===
After the war, the Papua and New Guinea Act 1949 united the Territory of Papua and the Territory of New Guinea as the Territory of Papua and New Guinea. However, for the purposes of Australian nationality a distinction was maintained between the two territories. The act provided for a Legislative Council (which was established in 1951), a judicial system, a public service, and a system of local government. Notwithstanding that it was part of an administrative union, the Territory of Papua at all times retained a distinct legal status and identity; it was a Possession of the Crown, whereas the Territory of New Guinea was initially a League of Nations mandate territory and subsequently a United Nations trust territory. This legal and political distinction remained until the advent of the Independent State of Papua New Guinea in 1975.

Under Australian Minister for External Territories Andrew Peacock, the territory adopted self-government in 1972 and on 15 September 1975, during the term of the Whitlam government in Australia, the Territory became the independent nation of Papua New Guinea.

== Government and administration ==
The Papua Act 1905 created the new post of lieutenant-governor of Papua, who was appointed by the governor-general of Australia on the advice of the relevant minister. The lieutenant-governor was assisted by an executive council comprising six government officials. A legislative council was also established comprising the six "official" members of the executive council and three "unofficial" members nominated by the lieutenant-governor from the territory's white population.

=== Exploration ===
The territory's administration sponsored a number of expeditions (often known as "patrols") to explore and map the New Guinea Highlands, then largely unknown to Westerners. In 1910, acting administrator Staniforth Smith personally led an expedition into the hinterland of the Gulf of Papua, intending to explore the Kikori River and then cross overland to the Fly River. Smith's expedition was widely regarded as a disaster; his party became lost and seven Papuan carriers were killed in a rafting accident. On returning to the coast it was realised that they had travelled in a circle.

In 1928, the North-West Patrol led by Charles Karius and Ivan Champion completed the first recorded crossing of New Guinea at its widest point, travelling overland from the headwaters of the Fly River in the territory of Papua to the Sepik River in the mandated territory of New Guinea.

== See also ==
- List of colonial heads of Papua
- Hiri Motu
- History of Papua New Guinea
- History of Queensland
- History of Australia
