= Onobasulu language =

Bosavi language spoken in Papua New Guinea

Onobasulu
- Region: Papua New Guinea
- Native speakers: 1,000 (2010)
- Language family: Trans–New Guinea: Bosavi; Onobasulu

Language codes
- ISO 639-3: onn
- Glottolog: onob1238

Onobasulu is a Papuan language of Papua New Guinea, primarily spoken in the province of Southern Highlands. Half of its speakers are monolingual.
