= Kaluli people =

Indigenous people of Papua New Guinea

Kaluli
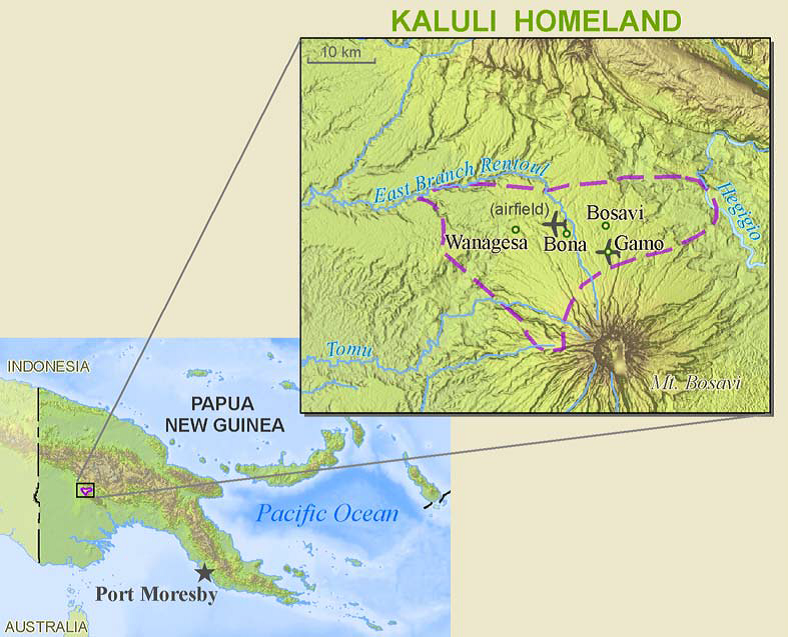
- Map of the Kaluli's territory

Total population
- 2,000 (as of 1987)

Regions with significant populations
- Rainforests of the Southern Highlands Province

The Kaluli are a clan of indigenous peoples who live in the rainforests of the Great Papuan Plateau in Papua New Guinea. The Kaluli, who numbered approximately 2,000 people in 1987, are the most numerous and well documented by post-contact ethnographers and missionaries among the four language-clans of Bosavi kalu ("men or people of Bosavi") that speak non-Austronesian languages. Their numbers are thought to have declined steeply following post-contact epidemics of measles and influenza in the 1940s, and have not rebounded due to high infant mortality rates and periodic influenza outbreaks. The Kaluli are mostly monolingual and speak Kaluli, an ergative language.

== Demographics ==
The name Kaluli, with the addition of the suffix -li, directly translates to "real people of Bosavi." The Kaluli population was reported as 1,200 individuals in 1969, and 2,000 in 1987. They reside primarily in the tropical rainforest of the Southern Highlands Province, on the Great Papuan Plateau near Mount Bosavi.

The first group of Europeans arrived in Papua New Guinea in 1934, bringing trade goods such as knives, mirrors, beads, and pearl shells. European contact was interrupted during World War II and remained infrequent between 1950 and 1964.

The Kaluli live across roughly 20 communities, each of which serve as individual clan identities. As one source explains, "It is used much like a name in friendly socializing; in war, these place names serve other purposes." Longhouses not only provide shelter but also symbolize a deep connection to the land, an integral aspect of Kaluli culture.

== Settlements ==
Kaluli tribes live in a number of separate patrilocal villages, meaning that the men serve as the heads of the tribes, and belong to lineages of patrilineal clans. Members of a given village typically all live in a single longhouse, which is surrounded by a number of smaller dwellings. Each longhouse houses approximately 15 families, numbering approximately 60 to 90 people, each of which divide into two or three patrilineal lineages. Many families have begun to live in smaller separate dwellings for two or more extended families, while still maintaining their communal longhouse (circa 1984). The Kaluli are a highly egalitarian people without a hierarchical authority or ranked social structure. They are swidden agriculturalists whose food staple is the sago. They maintain extensive gardens, while also pursuing hunting and fishing. The Kaluli diet is supplemented by garden cultivated banana, pandanus, breadfruit and green vegetables, as well as fish, small game such as birds and rabbits, wild pig, and occasionally domestic pig. Kaluli people also believe that male initiation must be performed by ritually delivering the semen of an elderly community member into the initiate's anus.

Large longhouses typically have dimensions of 60 feet by 30 feet, with porches on both ends, made five feet to twelve feet off the ground. As well as people, longhouses are often inhabited by pigs, which are used as "watchdogs" due to their ability to recognise strangers. The interior of a longhouse is not separated by gender; the women, children, and piglets are not consigned to a specific space, and sleep in the passageways down the sides. "Fireboxes are used for smaller, solitary meals or "snacks," but the longhouse functions as much as a town hall as it does a residence." The longhouse is where tribes-people have community meetings, meals, and conduct activities together. Longhouses are temporary structures, and decompose after two or three years. The residents then move and build another community in a new area.

== Language and development ==
The everyday life of the Kaluli people has been characterized by ethnolinguists as overtly centered on verbal interaction (in comparison to middle-class Anglo cultures). Spoken language is used as the primary explicit method of communicating desires, expression of thought, control and appeal. It is therefore the primary index of cultural competence. This is especially expressed in the socialization, or child-raising process, of infants to adults. For instance, when an infant first uses the words for "mother" and "breast", the behaviors oriented toward that child change: beforehand, a child is not considered to be capable of having specific intentions, whereas after this competence milestone the process of "teaching [the child] how to talk" begins, and thus talk begins to be directed directly at the child. This does not exist in middle-class Anglo cultures, where infants are addressed somewhat like intentioned competent individuals from birth through the use of baby-talk, a behaviour which is not present in Kaluli culture. For this reason, the Kaluli language has been one of the languages invoked to describe the difficulty of metapragmatic analysis in linguistics—in that many ethnographers, linguists, and anthropologists are biased towards their own culture—and to lobby for a more comparative approach.

== Social order ==
=== Politics ===
In contrast to many other highland tribes, politics in the Kaluli society is highly egalitarian, both politically and economically. In addition, they do not have any formal positions of leadership, with no equivalent role to a tribal chief. There is no formal system of social control; informal sanctions typically function through the wealthy and tribal elders. Wealth is measured via longhouse ownership, as well as possession of food and trade goods. Crimes are rarely committed, with the usual causes of conflicts being theft and death. Wealthy members of a tribe tend to hold the most power and political weight, similar to other highland groups.

=== Trade and labor ===
The trade conducted by the Kaluli with other tribes, as well as within their community, primarily revolves around life-cycle and political activity. While their most long-standing trade agreements are with tribes to the north, they interact with various others. From the west, they can avail of hornbill beaks and strings of dog's teeth. From the south, tree oil. The primary trade goods are gardening tools, stone adzes, bows, and net bags; most other needs are foraged or created by the tribe itself. The Kaluli's main trade partners have historically been the Huli in the highlands, which provided salt, tobacco, and aprons from woven net. "The forest provides materials for constructing longhouses and fences ... most elaborate items of manufacture are the extravagant costumes for ceremonial occasions."

Labor and socialization are cooperative, men and women having different areas of focus. The women look after the pigs and hunt small forest game. They are in charge of cooking, as well as processing the starch of the Kulali's staple food sago. Importantly, the women are also in charge of socializing with the children. The men perform most labor as a group. Male relationships among the Kulali are based on reciprocity and obligation in order to accomplish demanding tasks, such as hunting large forest game, cutting down trees, clearing plots for the gardens, and constructing dams and fences.

== Social organization ==
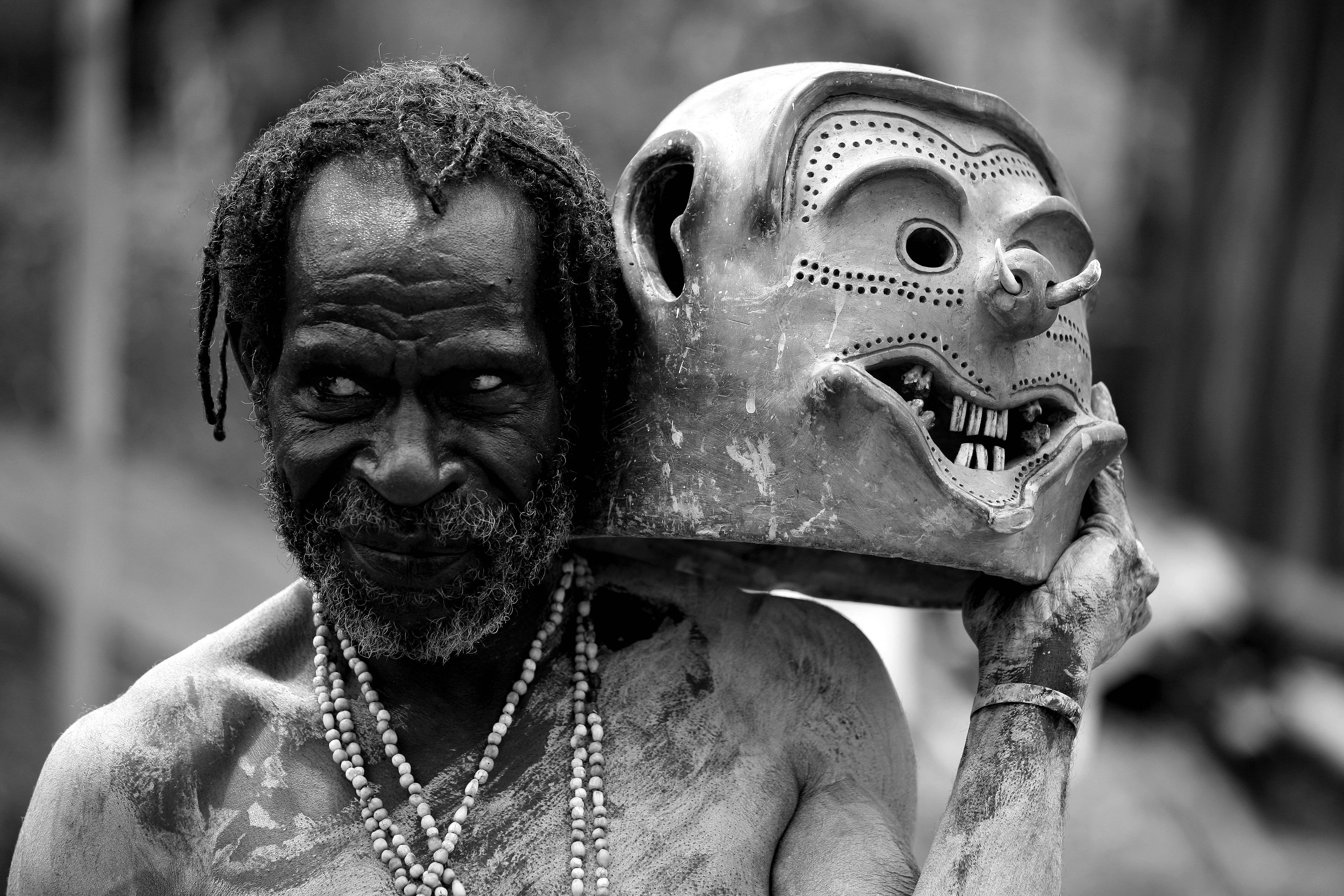
Tribes reenact the legend of the Mud Men. This tradition is used to scare the deceased ancestors off their land.

The Kalui are an exogamous group, marrying outside of their specific community. Their society is made up of patrilineal clans; each longhouse/community having two or more lineages or clans. Even though they are a patrilineal clan, each claims ties to both the mother's and father's sides. Paternal kin provides the relationship between longhouses across tribes, while the maternal kin offers relations between individuals to relatives, but only intimately connected to one side of the family. Relationships between villages are maintained through marriages with a matrilineal affiliation. The Kaluli prefer to marry those from a different clan precisely because they are unfamiliar with them. Marries are almost always arranged, and elders instigate the binding ritual without the bride or the groom knowing. Divorce is not practiced. Marriages are a lifelong exchange, bringing food and hospitality across clans. When a member of a longhouse is married, their housemates contribute to the bride price.

== The giving and sharing of food ==
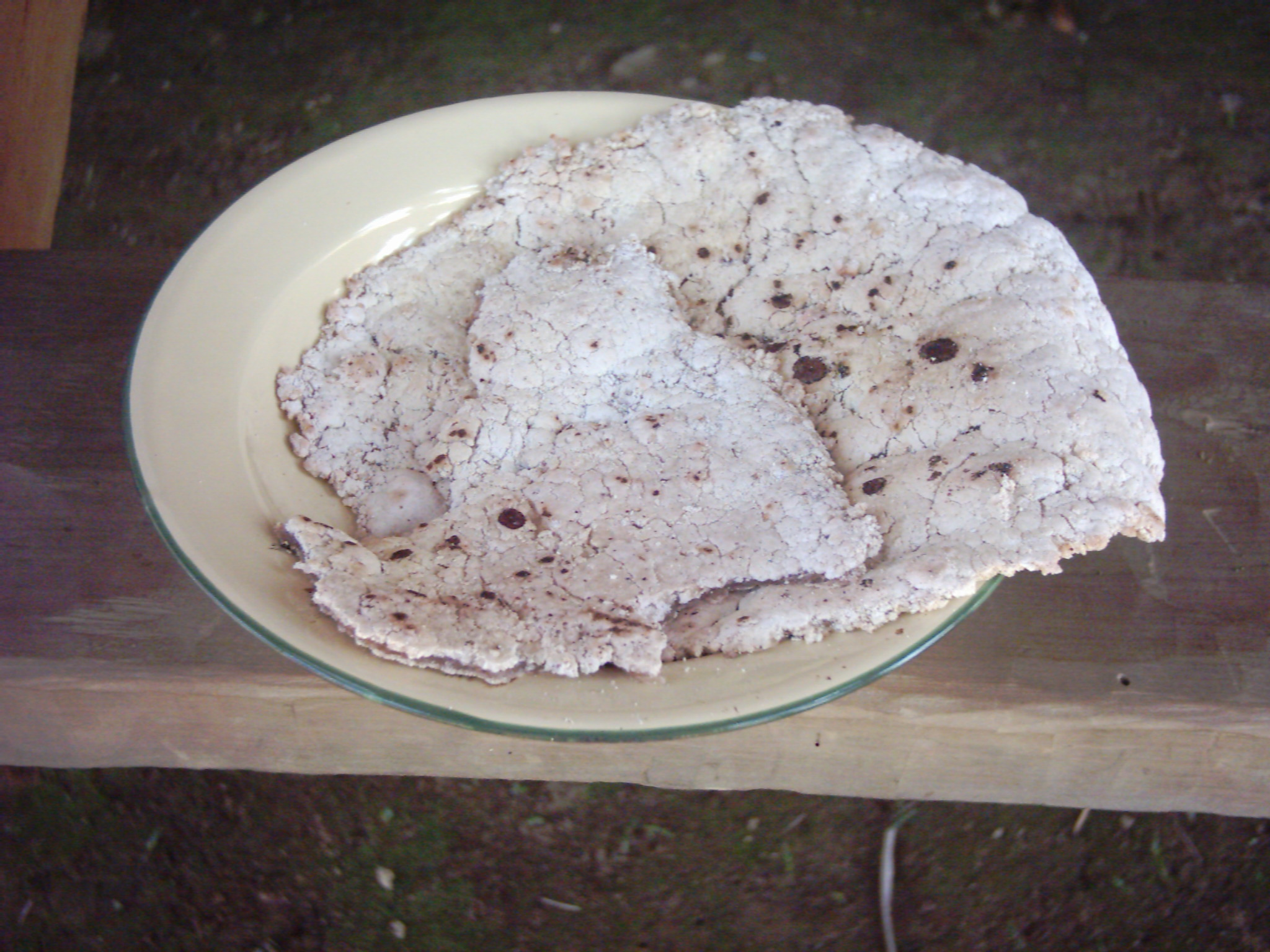
Above is a Sago pancake made from the starch of a sago palm. The sago palm is key to nourishment in the Kaluli diet. There is a long process that includes cutting and draining the palm to extract its flour, which is then mashed and cooked into a pancake.

The Kaluli are intimate with their land, giving unique names to their trees, rivers, and streams. They practice swidden horticulture in extensive gardens, and have a rich and varied diet. Their daily protein consists of fish, crayfish, rodents, and lizards. Fish are in abundance, and a small number of pigs are domesticated. Their dependence on forest foods, however, has ultimately contributed to a low population density. Other than protein, most of their food comes from trees and plants, especially grain and vegetables.

Interpersonal relationships are the central theme of Kaluli culture. Food is highly important in making this element work; it is a primary way of relating to children, and of showing affection. Sharing food is an expected norm. Hospitality is measured largely through the sharing of food; when visiting a friend, the type of food brought to a host is dependent on how close the relationship with them is. The Kaluli automatically offer food to relatives visiting from other longhouses; if hospitality is not provided to the family, they would be in a kind of "social limbo." The quality of hospitality increases on ceremonial occasions, when longhouses host other longhouses. As a sign of commitment to the bond between the groups, hosts are not allowed to eat during the occasion; they only present the food, sit separately, and watch the guests eat. Beyond ceremonial occasions, two Kaluli can express special affection for each other by sharing a meal of some kind of meat, and then referring to each other by the name of the food they shared. For example, if a pair shared a bandicoot they would call each other "my bandicoot," indicating their close relationship.

== Religion ==
The Kaluli believe in an 'unseen world', as well as spirits of the forest, and of animals. The Kaluli do not wake to the sunrise, instead to the call of a pigeon for its mother. Unseen people are referred to as either a "shadow" or "reflection"; if the shadow dies or is killed, the Kaluli counterpart does also. The unseen world is seen as being home to the spirits of the dead, along with spirits that never took a human body. Reciprocal spirits can be found in wild pigs and cassowaries. The Kaluli do not believe that the dead bring ill will to the living.

=== Creation myth ===
The creation myth of the Kaluli was recorded by anthropologist and ethnographer Edward L. Shieffelin, whose first contact with them took place in the late 1960s. The story begins in a time the Kaluli call hena madaliaki, which translates "when the land came into form." During the time of hena madaliaki people covered the earth, but there was nothing else: no trees or plants, no animals, and no streams. With nothing to use for food or shelter, the people became cold and hungry. Then one man among them (alternative accounts give two) gathered everyone together and delegated different tasks. He directed one group to become trees and they did. He directed another to become sago, yet another to be fish, another banana and so forth until the world was brimming with animals, food, streams, mountains and all other natural features. There were only a few people left, who became the ancestors of present-day human beings.

The Kaluli describe this story as "the time when everything alə bano ane" which means roughly "the time when everything divided". This concept of all world phenomena as a result of a "splitting" has many echos in Kaluli thought and cultural practices. In the Kaluli world view, all of existence is made from people who differentiated into different forms. Animals, plants, streams and people are all the same except in the form they have assumed following this great split. Death is another splitting. The Kaluli have no concept of a transcendent, sacred domain that is spiritual or in any fundamental way distinct from the natural, material world; instead death is another event that divides beings through the acquisition of new forms which are unrecognizable to the living.

Following extensive Christian missionary efforts in the region beginning in the 1940s, variants of the traditional creation story have adopted a few Christian elements. Prior to contact, the Kaluli story described creation as a pragmatic solution to problems of cold and hunger, and the efforts were initiated by one or two ordinary and unnamed men rather than any deity or deities. The Kaluli have since tended to identify one or both of them as "Godeyo" (God) and "Yesu" (Jesus Christ).

== See also ==
- Kaluli creation myth
- Mount Bosavi
- Steven Feld
