= Leonard Murray (administrator) =

Australian colonial administrator (1886-1963)

Leonard Murray CBE
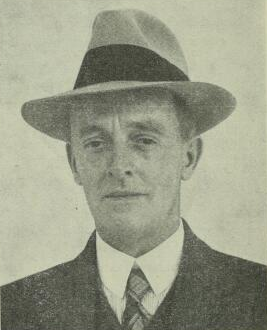
- Murray in 1939

Administrator of Papua
- In office 1940–1942
- Preceded by: Hubert Murray
- Succeeded by: Basil Morris

Personal details
- Born: 13 December 1886 Watsons Bay, New South Wales
- Died: 10 December 1963 (aged 76) Manly, Australia

Hubert Leonard Murray CBE (13 December 1886 – 10 December 1963) was an Australian colonial administrator who served as Administrator of Papua between 1940 and 1942

== Biography ==
Murray was born in Watsons Bay, New South Wales in 1886 to James Aubrey Gibbes Murray and Marian Edith Murray (née Lewis).

The nephew of Hubert Murray, who was appointed Lieutenant-Governor of Papua in 1908, Murray also moved to Papua in 1909 to become his uncle's assistant private secretary. He took part in the trials for the Australian Olympic swimming team for the 1912 Summer Olympics, but was narrowly defeated. He was promoted to private secretary in 1913, and married Pauline Anne Schomburgk in February 1915; the couple later had a son. In 1916 he became official secretary. He subsequently served in the territory's Legislative Council and Executive Council from 1925. In the 1936 New Year Honours he was made a CBE.

Murray was appointed Resident Magistrate in 1940, before succeeding his uncle as Lieutenant Governor later in the year, with the post renamed to "Administrator". He remained in post until the declaration of military rule in February 1942, at which point he moved to Sydney, where he joined the General Headquarters of the Allied Geographical Section.

He died at his home in the Sydney suburb of Manly on 10 December 1963.
