= Oliver Fellows Tomkins =

English missionary (1873–1901)

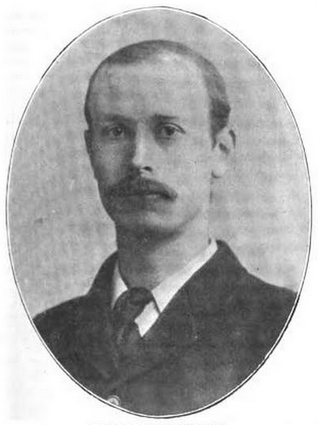
Oliver Fellows Tomkins (1873–1901), English Protestant missionary from Great Yarmouth

Oliver Fellows Tomkins (1873 – 8 April 1901) was an English-born Congregationalist missionary. Tomkins spent little over a year as a missionary in Papua New Guinea before he died a violent death alongside James Chalmers ("Tamate") in 1901.

== Early years ==
Oliver Fellows Tomkins was born in Great Yarmouth in 1873, the son of Daniel Tomkins and his second wife Caroline Katie Fellows. He was educated at his father's school in Yarmouth, and afterwards, for a short time, in Switzerland. He spent five years in business in Norwich, and was a member of Dr Barrett's church. He then became a student at Harley House, Dr. Henry Grattan Guinness' Training College, at Bromley-by-Bow, and took the medical course at Livingstone College. During his vacations, Tomkins did evangelistic work among the fishermen of the North Sea fleet, and mission work in English country villages with caravan and tent.

== Career ==
Tomkins was appointed to work in the Torres Strait (New Guinea), and was selected by the "Home Magazine Missionary Band" as one of their own missionaries, half the cost of his support being borne by members of that Band. He sailed on 8 December 1899, with the Rev Albert Pearse, to join Chalmers in his work in the Torres Strait.

Chalmers had been pleased in the arrival of Tomkins in 1900 to share the burden of his large district with him. Throughout Mrs. Chalmers's last illness, Tomkins had been "a great help and a great comfort". "No son could have treated me more kindly than he did." In the accession of this young colleague, Chalmers saw reasons for hoping that he might have more time to return to his pioneer work.

A few months after Tomkins's arrival, there came a brief message from Chalmers to the Mission House regarding Tomkins:— "He will do; send us two more of the same sort." That opinion, formed almost at first sight, was confirmed in the months that followed. Again and again, Chalmers testified to his strong affection for, and approval of, Tomkins. They were indeed, as Dr. William George Lawes has called them, "the intrepid Paul and the beloved Timothy."

== Death ==
Accompanied by Tomkins, Chalmers arrived at the Aird River of Goaribari Island on board the Niue on 7 April 1901. The last entry in Tomkins' diary supplied some account of the first communications with the cannibals of Gulf Province:

In the afternoon we were having a short service with the crew, when about twenty canoes were seen approaching.... They hesitated as they got nearer to us, till we were able to assure them that we meant peace. Gradually one or two of the more daring ones came closer, and then alongside, till at last one ventured on board. Then, in a very few minutes, we were surrounded by canoes, and our vessel was covered with them.... On this, our first visit, we were able to do really nothing more than establish friendly relations with the people. They stayed on board about three hours, examining everything, from the ship's rigging to our shirt buttons. They tried hard to persuade us to come ashore in their canoes, but we preferred to spend the night afloat, and promised we would visit their village in the morning.

None of the Niue missionaries or the twelve native Christians who accompanied them were seen after the visit. What really happened was only ascertained a month later, when George Le Hunte, Lieutenant-Governor of the Colony, visited the Aird River with a punitive expedition and heard the story from a captured prisoner. This was quoted from an account supplied by the Rev Archibald Ernest Hunt, who accompanied the Lieutenant-Governor:

The Niue anchored off Kisk Point on April 7, and a crowd of natives came off. As it was near sunset, Tamate gave them some presents, and made signs that they were to go away, and the next day he would visit them ashore. At daylight the next morning, a great crowd of natives came off and crowded the vessel in every part. They refused to leave, and in order to induce them to do so, Tamate gave Bob, the captain, orders to give them presents. Still they refused to move, and then Tamate said he would go ashore with them, and he told Tomkins to remain on board. The latter declined, and went ashore with Tamate, followed by a large number of canoes. When they got ashore, the whole party were massacred and their heads cut off. The boat was smashed up, and the clothing etc. distributed. All the bodies were distributed and eaten, Tomkins being eaten at the village of Dopima, where they were all killed.

There is a memorial plaque to Tomkins in the United Reformed Church, Princes St, Norwich.

== See also ==
- Cannibalism in Oceania
- List of incidents of cannibalism
