= Ivan Champion =

Australian public servant

Official Member of the Legislative Council
- In office 1951–1963

Personal details
- Born: 9 March 1904; Port Moresby, Papua
- Died: 12 August 1989 (aged 85); Canberra, Australia

Ivan Francis Champion OBE (9 March 1904 – 12 August 1989) was an Australian public servant in Papua New Guinea. He served as a member of the Legislative Council between 1951 and 1963.

== Biography ==
Champion was born in Port Moresby in 1904, the eldest son of Herbert William and Florence Louise May Mary Chester Champion (née Foran). His father served as Government Secretary of the Territory of Papua from 1913 to 1942. He attended Port Moresby European School from 1911 to 1914, Manly Public School in Sydney in 1915, and then the Southport School in Queensland from 1916 to 1922. Unable to fulfil his ambition to join the navy due to poor eyesight and discouraged from becoming a patrol officer in Papua by his father, who was concerned about accusations of nepotism, he began working for Union Bank in Sydney. However, he was able to join the Papuan civil service following a 1923 meeting with Papua's Lieutenant-Governor Hubert Murray, becoming a cadet clerk the following May.

He was initially posted to Kerema, before being transferred to Kambisi to help run a new police post the following year. After impressing his superior Charles Karius, he was chosen as Karius' assistant for an attempt to cross New Guinea across the Central Range in 1926–27. Although the first attempt ended in failure, a second attempt in 1927–28 was successful. Following the expeditions, he served in Kambisi, Ioma, Misima Island, Rigo and the Trobriand Islands. In September 1929 he married Elsie May Sutherland Ross in Port Moresby. He subsequently published a book about the patrols, Across New Guinea from the Fly to the Sepik, in 1932. In 1936 he led a mission to establish a patrol post at Lake Kutubu, where he remained as officer-in-charge from 1937 until January 1940. He was then appointed acting resident magistrate at Kikori, before being transferred to Misima later in the year. In 1941 he was transferred to Rigo and then back to Misima.

Following the Japanese invasion in January 1942, Champion joined the militia in February, before being appointed a sub-lieutenant in the Royal Australian Naval Volunteer Reserve. He became commanding officer of HMAS Laurabada and helped evacuate soldiers from Jacquinot Bay in April 1942, earning a promotion to lieutenant in June. He then became commander of HMAS Paluma, surveying the north-eastern coast of Papua and dropping off coastwatchers at their stations. He was demobilised in October 1945 and rejoined the civil service as a district officer in Western District.

In 1946 Champion was appointed assistant director of the Department of District Services and Native Affairs, before serving as acting director from 1949. In 1951 he was in charge of the relief operations following a volcanic eruption at Mount Lamington. Later the same year he was appointed to the Legislative Council alongside his brother Claude. He became chief commissioner of the Native Land Commission in 1952, and was awarded an OBE in 1953. After becoming senior commissioner of the Land Titles Commission in 1963, he retired the following year. He then became commander of the Laurabada again, now a civil ship, and took up contracts surveying the coasts of Australia and Bangladesh. He moved to Brisbane, Banora Point and then Canberra, where he died in Woden Valley Hospital in August 1989.
