= Higaturu Rural LLG =

Local-level government in Papua New Guinea

- Country: Papua New Guinea
- Province: Oro Province
- Time zone: UTC+10 (AEST)

District map of Oro Province

Higaturu Rural LLG is a local-level government (LLG) of Oro Province, Papua New Guinea.

== Wards ==
- 01. New Warisota
- 02. Hohorita
- 03. Igora Oil Palm Blks
- 04. Koipa
- 05. Kiorota
- 06. Barevoturu
- 07. Kendata
- 08. Duve
- 09. Kongohambou
- 10. Binduta
- 11. Handarituru
- 12. Awala
- 13. Sui
- 14. Boru
- 15. Mumuni
- 16. Koropata
- 17. Sirembi
- 18. Hungiri
- 19. Sakita
- 20. Papoga
- 21. Ongoho
- 22. Ehu
- 23. Ahora & Beuru
- 24. West Ambogo (Sangara)
- 25. Sangara 1
- 26. Sangara 2
- 27. Isivini
- 28. Horau
