= Mount Bosavi =

Mountain in Papua New Guinea

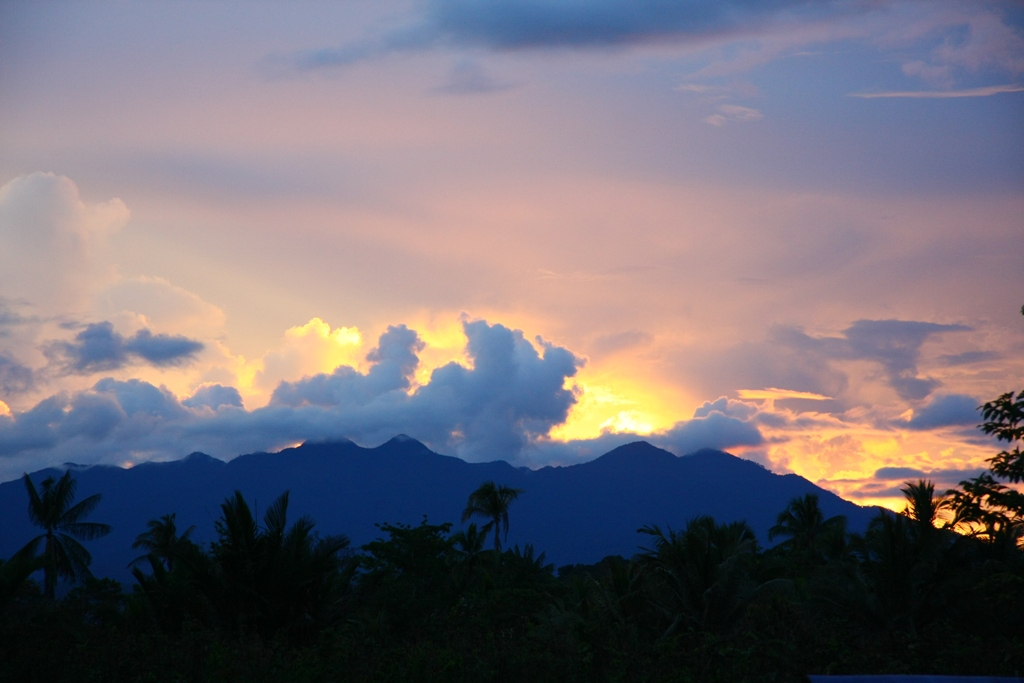
- Mount Bosavi in October 2008

Highest point
- Elevation: 2,507 m (8,225 ft)
- Prominence: 1,887 m (6,191 ft)
- Listing: Ultra, Ribu
- Coordinates: 6°36′51″S 142°49′36″E

Geography
- Location within Papua New Guinea
- Location: Southern Highlands, Papua New Guinea

Geology
- Mountain type: Volcano
- Last eruption: 200,000 years ago

Mount Bosavi is a mountain in the Southern Highlands province, Papua New Guinea. It is the collapsed cone of an extinct volcano on the Great Papuan Plateau, part of the Kikori River basin. The crater is approximately 4 km wide and 1 km deep; it is home to a number of endemic species.

Part of the mountain is included in the Sulamesi Wildlife Management Area, established in 2006. It forms part of the proposed UNESCO World Heritage Site Kikori River Basin/Great Papuan Plateau. The people living just north of the mountain refer to themselves as Bosavi kalu (people of Bosavi) and divide into four culturally identical but linguistically marked groups, the Kaluli, Ologo, Walulu, and Wisesi. Collectively they are often referred to as Bosavi kalu ("men of Bosavi").

== Fauna and flora ==
A 2009 expedition by an international team of scientists and a television crew from the BBC Natural History Unit filming Lost Land of the Volcano, a BBC wildlife documentary, discovered more than 40 previously undescribed species, including 16 frogs, at least 3 fish, several insects and spiders, a bat, and a giant rat, measuring 82 cm in length and weighing approximately 1.5 kg. Mount Bosavi is also the type locality for Pseudohydromys pumehanae, a recently described species of moss-mouse.

== See also ==
- Mount Bosavi languages
