= James Chalmers (missionary) =

Missionary who was killed and eaten

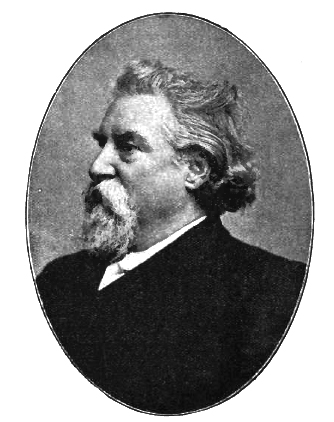
- Missionary to New Guinea
- Born: 4 August 1841; Ardrishaig, Argyll, Scotland
- Died: 8 April 1901 (aged 59); Goaribari Island, Papua

James Chalmers (4 August 1841 – 8 April 1901) was a Scottish-born missionary active in Rarotonga and New Guinea. He was killed and eaten on a small island in the Gulf of Papua, together with 13 companions.

== Life and death ==
James Chalmers was born in the village of Ardrishaig, Argyll, Scotland, as the only son of an Aberdonian stonemason. The family moved to Inveraray when he was seven.

From 1867 to 1877 he worked for the London Missionary Society in Rarotonga, the largest of the Cook Islands. Afterwards he moved to New Guinea, where he spent the rest of his life, setting up a network of local teachers along the coast to spread the Christian faith.

In April 1901, Chalmers visited Goaribari Island in the Gulf of Papua, together with Oliver Fellows Tomkins, a young colleague. Travelling by ship along the Aird River, they made contact with locals who seemed friendly. But the missionaries preferred to spend the night on their vessel, not trusting them fully. In the morning they agreed to come ashore, under pressure from the locals who refused to leave their ship if they did not comply. There Chalmers, Tomkins, and 12 native Christians who accompanied them were ambushed, killed, and eaten, while their vessel was destroyed and their possessions distributed.

== Family ==
Chalmers' first wife Jane died on 20 February 1879; they had one child who died young.

In 1888 he married Sarah Elizabeth Harrison, a widow from East Retford who had been a childhood friend of his first wife; she died on 25 October 1900.

== Botanical legacy ==
Specimens collected by Chalmers are cared for at the National Herbarium of Victoria (MEL), Royal Botanic Gardens Victoria, the majority of which were gathered in Papua New Guinea.

== See also ==
- Cannibalism in Oceania
- List of incidents of cannibalism
