= Mount Sisa =

Mountain in Papua New Guinea

- Location within Papua New Guinea

Highest point
- Elevation: 2,650 m (8,690 ft)
- Coordinates: 6°08′52″S 142°45′17″E

Geography
- Country: Papua New Guinea
- Province: Hela

Geology
- Rock age: Pleistocene
- Mountain type: Stratovolcano

Mt. Sisa is a heavily eroded Pleistocene stratovolcano in Hela, Papua New Guinea. The taller of the mountain's two main peaks is estimated to be 2,650 metres (8,690 ft) high. The northern peak has a communications mast. The epicentre of the 2018 Papua New Guinea earthquake was on the mountain's northern foothills.

A tiny species of frogs, Choerophryne allisoni, is only known from its type locality on Mount Sisa.

== See also ==
- Mount Sisa languages
