= Bosavi languages =

Trans–New Guinea language family

Bosavi
- Papuan Plateau
- Geographic distribution: Papuan Plateau, Papua New Guinea
- Linguistic classification: Trans–New Guinea: Bosavi

Language codes
- Glottolog: bosa1245
- Map: The Bosavi languages of New Guinea The Bosavi languages Other Trans–New Guinea languages Other Papuan languages Austronesian languages Uninhabited

The Bosavi or Papuan Plateau languages belong to the Trans-New Guinea language family according to the classifications made by Malcolm Ross and Timothy Usher. This language family derives its name from Mount Bosavi and the Papuan Plateau.

Geographically, the Bosavi languages are situated to the east and south of the East Strickland group. They can be found around Mount Bosavi, located east of the Strickland River and southwest of the western edge of the central highlands of Papua New Guinea. Although no extensive subgrouping analysis has been conducted, Shaw's lexicostatistical study in 1986 provides some insights.

Based on this study, it is indicated that Kaluli and Sonia exhibit a significant lexical similarity of 70%, which is higher than any other languages compared. Therefore, it is likely that these two languages form a subgroup. Similarly, Etoro and Bedamini share a subgroup with a lexical similarity of 67%. The languages Aimele, Kasua, Onobasulu, and Kaluli-Sunia exhibit more shared isoglosses among themselves than with the Etoro-Bedamini group. Some of these shared isoglosses are likely to be innovations.

== Languages ==
The languages, which are closely related, are:

- Mount Bosavi: Kaluli–Sonia, Aimele (Kware), Kasua
- Onobasulu
- Mount Sisa: Edolo–Beami
- Dibiyaso (Bainapi)

It is worth noting these languages share at best 70% lexical (vocabulary) similarity, as in the case of Kaluli–Sonia and Edolo–Beami. The rest of related languages likely share around 10–15% lexical similarities.

The unity of the Bosavi languages was quantitatively demonstrated by Evans and Greenhill (2017).

Palmer et al. (2018) consider Dibiyaso to be a language isolate.

== Pronouns ==
Pronouns are:

	sg	pl
1	*na	*ni-
2	*ga	*gi-
3	*ya	*yi-

== Vocabulary comparison ==
The following basic vocabulary words are from the Trans-New Guinea database:

The words cited constitute translation equivalents, whether they are cognate (e.g. aubi, awbi, aube for "moon") or not (e.g. dɔa, igi, kele for "stone").

gloss	Aimele	Beami	Biami	Edolo	Kaluli	Kaluli (Bosavi dial.)	Kasua	Onabasulu	Sonia
head	mufa	tialuna; tiaruma	taluba	b~pusʌ	mise; misẽ	pesʌi	bizei; pesai	kuni	eneipi
hair	mufa fɔnɔ	hinabu; osa	hinabo	b~pusʌ heni	misẽ fɔ̃; mise foon	medafɔn	bizei fʌnu; pesaifano	alu; kuni alu	eneipi fɔn
ear	keleni	kẽ	kȩ	kɛhe	kenẽ; malo	kælæn	kenane; kinɛli	kɔheni; koneni	ekadem
eye	si	si	sii	si	si		si	si	si
nose	migi	mi	mi	migʌni	migi		mi; mĩ	mi; mĩ	miki
tooth	bisi	pese; pẽsẽ	pese	p~bese	beso; bis	pes	apa	pese	ʌnenʌ
tongue	dabisẽ	eri; kɔnɛ̃su	kona̧su	eli	eʌn; sano	inem	tepe; tepɛ	eane; ɛane	tʌbise
leg	inebi	emo	emo	emɔ	gidaafoo; gip		onatu; unɛtu	emo; emɔ	eisep
louse	tede	imu	imu	imũ	fe; fẽ	tekeape	arupai; pfɛi	(fe); fẽ	fi
dog	ãgi	wæːme; weːme	wæmi	ɔgɔnɔ	gasa; kasʌ	kasa	kasoro; kʌsoro	gesu; kesɔ	wɛi
pig	kẽ	gebɔ		suguʌ	kabɔ		kɔpɔľɔ	tɔfene	kɛ
bird	abɔ	mæni	hega; mæni	hayʌ	ɔ̃bẽ; oloone; oobaa		anemae; ɛnim	haga; haka	ʌbɔ
egg	abɔ us̪u	ɔsɔ	oso	isɔ	ɔ̃bẽ uš; us		natape; ufu	hokaisu; sɔ	ʌtʌm
blood	omani	hæːľe	heale	hiʌle	hɔbɔ; hooboo		bebetʌ; pepeta	ibi	hʌbʌ
bone	ki	kasa; koso	kasa	kiwiː	ki		ki; kiː	kiwi	uku
skin	kãfu	kadofo; kadɔfɔ	kadofo	kʌdɔfɔ	dɔgɔf; toogoof	kapo	kapo; kʌːpɔ	tomola; tɔmɔla	ʌkʌf
breast	buː	toto; tɔtɔ	toto	tɔtɔ	bo; bu	bo	bɔ; po	bu	bɔ
tree	yebe	ifa	ifa	i	i		i; tai	i	yep
man	kɔlu	tunu	tunu̧	tɔnɔ	kalu		senae; senɛ	inɔlɔ; inoro	ʌsenʌ
woman	kaisale	uda	uda	udia	ga; kesali; kesari		kesare; kesʌľe	ido; idɔ	nʌisɔʌ
sun	ofɔ	esɔ; eṣɔ	eso	esɔ	of; ɔf	opo	ɔbɔ; opo	haro; hɔlɔ	of
moon	ole	aubi	awbi	aube	ili		kunɛi; opo	aube; aubo	weľe
water	hãni	hãlɔ̃; harõ	ha̧lo	ɔ̃tã	hɔ̃n; hoon	hoŋ	hano; hʌnɔ̃	hano; hanɔ	mɔ͂
fire	di	daru; nalu	dalu	nulu	de; di	de	homatos; tei	de; ti	de
stone	dɔa	igi	kele	igi	u		etewʌ; etoa	abane	ka
road, path		nɔgo				isu			
name	wi	diɔ; diɔ̃	dio	ẽi	wi		unũ	wi	imi
eat	mayã	na; naha	na-imo-	nahãː	maya		kinatapo; mɛnẽ	namana; namena	menʌ
one	ageli	afai	afa̧i̧	age	ãgel; angel		semeti; tekeape	agale	itidi
two	ageleweli	adunã	aduna	agedu	a̧dep; ãdip		ɛľipi	aganebo; aida	ani
