= Kasua language =

Language

Kasua
- Region: Papua New Guinea
- Native speakers: (600 cited 1990)
- Language family: Trans–New Guinea: Bosavi; Kaluli–Kasua; Kasua

Language codes
- ISO 639-3: khs
- Glottolog: kasu1251

Kasua is a Papuan language of Papua New Guinea.

== Phonology ==
=== Consonants ===
	Labial	Alveolar	Palatal	Velar	Glottal
Nasal	m	n			
Plosive	p	t		k	
Fricative	f	s			h
Approximant	w		j		
Flap		ɺ			

=== Vowels ===
	Front	Back
Close	i	
Mid		o
Open-mid	ɛ	ɔ
Open	æ	ɑ

== Orthography ==
Uppercase letters	A	A꞉	E	F	H	I	K		M	N	O	O꞉	P	S	T	U	W	Y
Lowercase letters	a	a꞉	e	f	h	i	k	l	m	n	o	o꞉	p	s	t	u	w	y
IPA	/ɑ/	/æ/	/ɛ/	/f/	/h/	/i/	/k/	/ɺ/	/m/	/n/	/o/	/ɔ/	/p/	/s/	/t/	/u/	/w/	/j/
