= Edolo language =

Papuan language of Papua New Guinea

Edolo
- Region: Papua New Guinea
- Ethnicity: Etoro people
- Native speakers: (1,700 cited 2000 census)
- Language family: Trans–New Guinea: Bosavi; Beami–Edolo; Edolo

Language codes
- ISO 639-3: etr
- Glottolog: edol1239

Edolo (Etoro) is a Papuan language of Papua New Guinea, spoken by the Etoro people. As of 2015, there were 300 monolingual speakers. It is part of the Bosavi branch of the Trans–New Guinea language family.
