= Charles Karius =

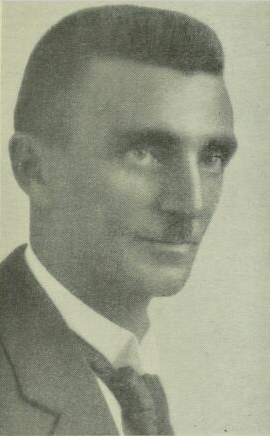
- Born: Charles Henry Karius; 1893; Australia
- Died: 1940 (aged 46–47); Sydney, Australia
- Occupations: Explorer, magistrate
- Known for: Exploring Territory of Papua
- Notable work: Across New Guinea from the Fly to the Sepik

Charles Henry Karius (1893 – 20 September 1940) was an Australian Assistant Resident Magistrate (Kiap) in Australian administered Papua who traversed the widest part of the island from the Fly River in Papua to the source of the Sepik River in New Guinea from December 1926 to January 1928.

During his service in the Territory of Papua in the 1920s, he made many photographs of the country and its people when on patrol, which he later published in book form with "Papua New Guinea patrols in 1923 and 1924".

After an unsuccessful first attempt in 1926, he succeeded in 1927–28 with second-in-command Ivan Champion and a party of 36 porters and 12 local policemen to traverse Papua from the south coast to the north across the widest part of the country. The journey involved following the course of the Fly River from its mouth on the south coast northwards to its source, trekking through the central highlands to the source of the Sepik River, and then following the course of that river north-west then eastward to the north coast. He afterwards published an account of the journey in a paper in The Geographical Journal ("Exploration in the Interior of Papua and North-East New Guinea: The Sources of the Fly, Palmer, Strickland, and Sepik Rivers") and Ivan Champion published an account in a book (Across New Guinea from the Fly to the Sepik). Charles Karius was awarded the 1929 Royal Geographical Society's Patron's Medal.

He died of cancer in Sydney, Australia, in 1940 when on sick leave.
