= Hubert Murray =

Australian judge (1861–1940)

Sir Hubert Murray KCMG
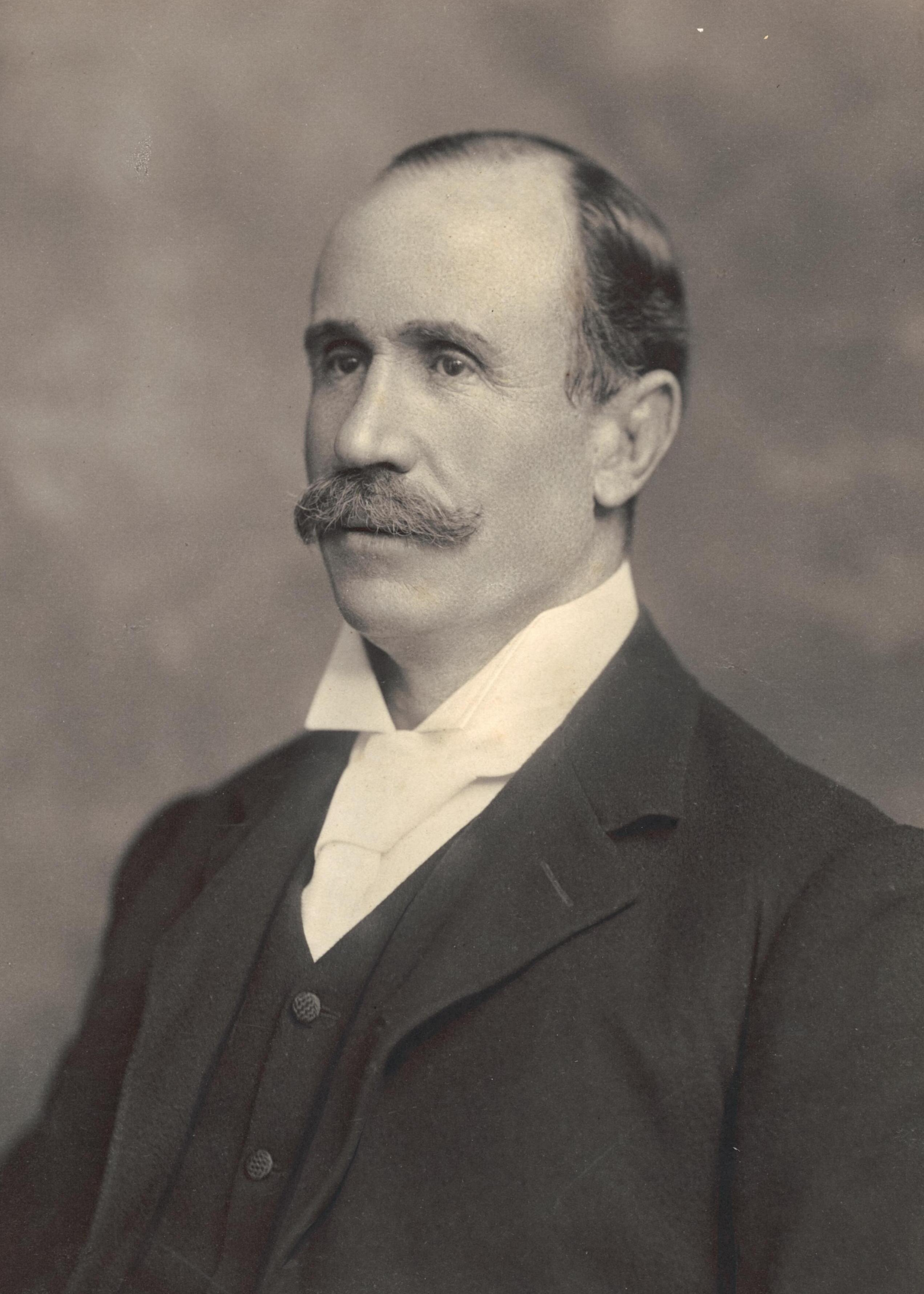

Lieutenant-Governor of Papua
- In office 23 November 1908 – 27 February 1940
- Preceded by: Francis Rickman Barton
- Succeeded by: Hubert Leonard Murray
- Born: 29 December 1861; Sydney, New South Wales
- Died: 27 February 1940 (aged 78); Samarai, Papua
- Height: 6 ft 3 in (191 cm)
- Spouse(s): Sybil Maud Jenkins (m. 1889; died 1929) Mildred Blanche Vernon (m. 1930)
- Father: Terence Aubrey Murray
- Relatives: Gilbert Murray (brother)

Sir John Hubert Plunkett Murray KCMG (29 December 1861 – 27 February 1940) was an Australian colonial administrator. He served as lieutenant governor of the Territory of Papua from 1908 until his death in 1940.

== Early life ==
Murray was born in Sydney, the son of Irish-born Terence Aubrey Murray (1810–73), and his second wife Agnes Ann, née Edwards; he was named after Terence Murray's friend John Hubert Plunkett. Murray was educated at a non-denominational school in Sydney, then attended a preparatory school in Melbourne in 1871. Between 1872 and 1877 Murray attended Sydney Grammar School, where he won several sporting prizes and was school captain in 1877. He then moved to England in 1878 and attended Brighton College (which expelled him after he punched a teacher) and Oxford University, where he attended Magdalen College. A tall (6'3" or 190 cm), powerfully built man, Murray played rugby for Harlequins and won the English amateur heavyweight boxing title.

After university he entered the legal profession, and was called to the bar at the Inner Temple in 1885. he subsequently returned to New South Wales and worked at a legal practice in Sydney. In 1892 Murray became a legal draftsman for the Parliament of New South Wales but described his time there as "living death in Macquarie Street". Sir Hubert Murray was made a Companion of the Order Order of Saint Michael and Saint George (C.M.G.) in 1914, and a Knight Commander (K.C.M.G.) of the same order in 1925.

== Military service ==
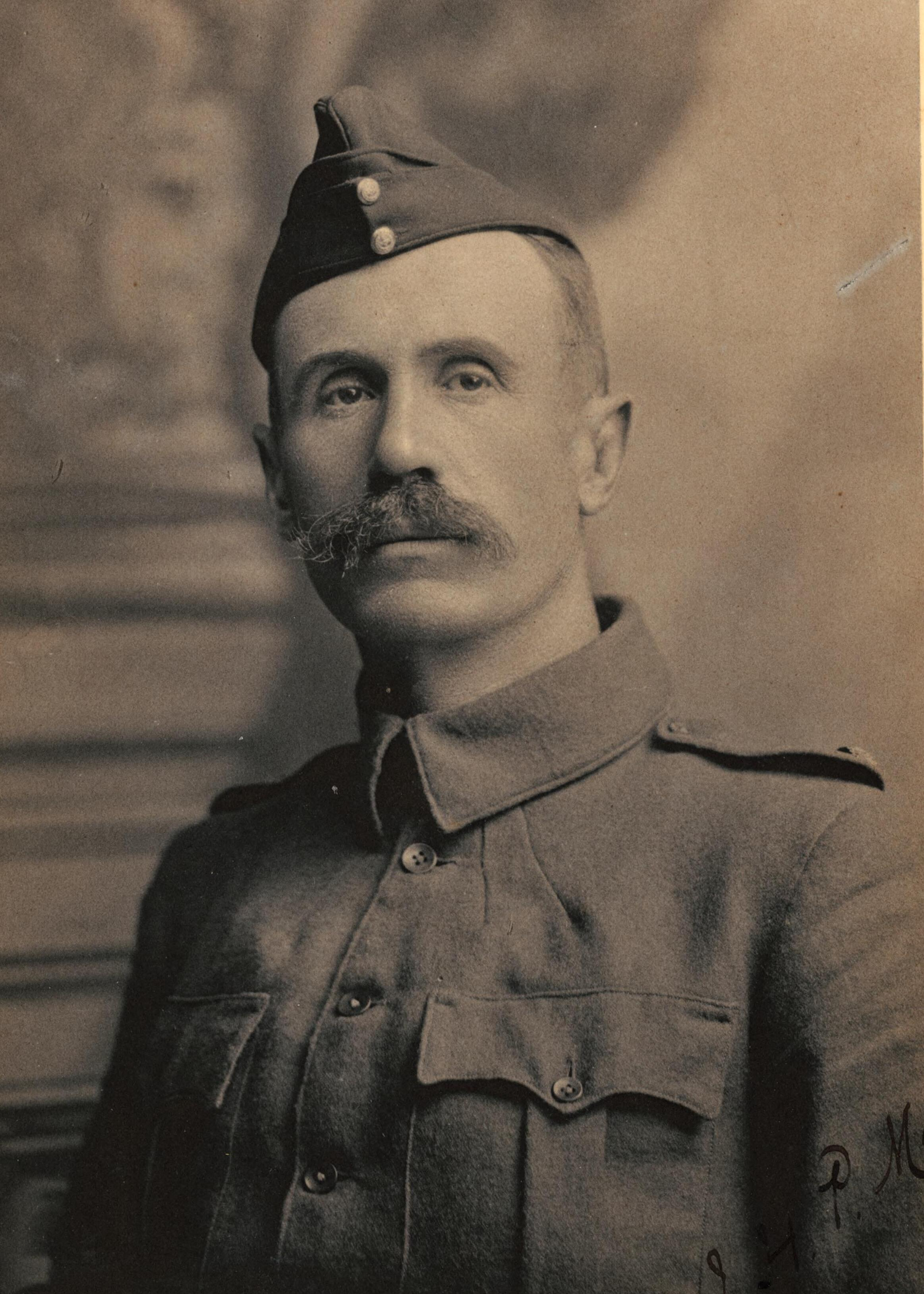
Murray in military uniform

Murray was involved in the formation of the New South Wales Irish Rifles, a part-time voluntary reserve unit intended to supplement the official colonial forces. He was commissioned as a captain in the unit in 1896 and became commanding officer in 1898 with the rank of major.

In 1900, Murray volunteered to fight in the Second Boer War, despite having personal misgivings about the war. He was initially stationed at Victoria West, later commanding New South Wales troops in the advance on Pretoria and at the Battle of Diamond Hill. His unit was subsequently tasked with implementing the British forces' scorched-earth policy, including breaking up Boer wagons and burning Boer farms. Murray disliked his duties and came to admire Boer general Christiaan de Wet. In private letters he observed that "there is nothing to do at the front except to steal cows". He was granted leave in late 1900 and left for England, returning to Australia in early 1901.

== New Guinea ==
In 1904, Murray was appointed chief judicial officer of British New Guinea, which had been placed under Australian authority in 1902 and was in the process of being formally reorganised as an Australian external territory. Due to the small size of the administration, his role encompassed duties across all three branches of government. He was appointed Acting Administrator in 1907 and Lieutenant-Governor in 1908, a position he held until his death at Samarai in 1940. Murray was involved in a controversial incident in which he attended a meeting called to suppress the activities of sorcerers (vadas or vatas), and local people attempted to demonstrate the power of their vadas by reviving a dog that had been killed.

Murray was succeeded as administrator by his nephew, Hubert Leonard Murray (1886–1963), who had been Official Secretary since 1916.

== Family ==
The Murray family was among the early settlers of the Canberra district of New South Wales, where his father Sir Terence Aubrey Murray owned Yarralumla, and Windradeen, at Lake George. His grandfather, Captain Terence Murray, was a member of the Coldstream Guards and came to Australia as the paymaster for the 48th Regiment after having been the Paymaster of the Irish Brigade of Guards since 1811.

Hubert was the brother of Gilbert Murray, Professor of Greek at Oxford University, and James Aubrey Gibbes Murray, the last child of Sir Terence Aubrey Murray's first marriage, to Mary Murray (nee Gibbes). Hubert Murray's sisters resided separately, at Yarralmula, with their grandparents Colonel and Elizabeth Gibbes, after the death of their mother. His sisters were Leila Alexandrina Murray, who later became a governess for Lady Agnes Murray, and Evelyn Mary Matilda Murray, later 'Morrison', who joined Gilbert Murray in London, and participated in Emmeline Pankhurst's suffrage movement with her daughter, also Mary. James 'Aubrey' Gibbes Murray, described by Gilbert as shy and retiring, was a draftsman for the NSW Department of Lands. Despite the distance, Gilbert's prolific correspondence kept the siblings and their children in close contact.

In 1889 Murray married Miss Sybil Maud Jenkins ( - 1929). They had three children:

- Mary, later married to Capt. Charles Robert Pinney, (1883 - 1945) Administrator of Norfolk Island from 1932 to 1937.
  - Mary and Charles had two children, Maura and Peter Pinney (1922 - 1992) noted travel writer.
  - Peter married Alice Brown (1933 - 1995) and they had a daughter Sava Pinney (1959 -). Peter married for a second time to Estelle Runcie.
- Major Terence Murray, D.S.O., M.C.
  - Terence married Philippa Kitchener, niece of the first Lord Kitchener and they had three daughters, Molly, Sybil and Sheila.
- Molly married Anthony Stallard, and they had two daughters, Carola Leonard and Serena Wallace. Carola married economist Michael Leonard, they had one daughter, photographer Crista Leonard. Serena married Australian Stephen Wallace and they had two sons, Matthew Wallace and Ollie Wallace.
- Patrick Desmond Fitzgerald Murray D.Sc.(1900-1967), professor of Zoology at Sydney University
  - Patrick married Margery Holland.
- Murray's brother Gilbert married Mary Howard, and they had a daughter Rosalind who married Arnold Toynbee. They had two sons, Philip and Lawrence.

On 20 February 1930 Hubert Murray married an Irish widow Mrs Mildred Blanche Vernon née Trench (1875 - 1960). They were later separated.

== Legacy ==
- In Port Moresby the PNG Army barracks (called Murray Barracks), the leading "international" primary school (called The Ela Murray International School), the Hubert Murray Stadium and the main highway are all named after him.
- The Official Papuan Collection, National Museum of Australia, over 3,000 items collected by Sir Hubert Murray for the Australian Territory of Papua, between 1907 and 1933, held in the National Museum of Australia.

== Publications ==
- Papua, or British New Guinea, London: T. Fisher Unwin, 1912
- Recent Exploration in Papua, Sydney: Turner & Henderson, 192?
- Papua Of To-Day or An Australian Colony in the Making, London: P. S. King and Son, 1925
- Native Administration in Papua, Port Moresby, June 1929
- Are Missions Necessary?, Sydney: Australian Board of Missions, 1930
- Selected Letters of Hubert Murray (ed. Francis West), Melbourne: Melbourne University Press, 1970

Booklets

- Report by His Excellency the Lieut.-Governor of Papua to the Minister for home and territories on an article on "Three power rule in New Guinea" by Rinzo Gond, Port Moresby, 1919
- Review of the Australian administration in Papua from 1907 to 1920, Port Moresby, 192?
- Anthropology and the Government of Subject Races, Port Moresby, 1921
- The population problem in Papua : a paper read by J. H. P. Murray, Lieutenant-Governor of Papua, before the Pan-Pacific Conference, at Melbourne, 21st August, 1923, Port Moresby, 1923
- Notes on Colon Ainsworth's Report on the Mandated Territory of New Guinea, 1924
- Native custom and the government of primitive races with especial reference to Papua : a paper read at the third Pan-Pacific Science Congress, Tokyo, 1926, Port Moresby, 1926
- The Response of the Natives of Papua to Western Civilisation, Port Moresby, 1928
- Indirect rule in Papua : a paper read before the Australasian Association for the Advancement of Science at Hobart, in January 1928, Port Moresby, 1928
- Native Labour in Papua, London: Anti-Slavery and Aborigines Protection Society, 1929
- The Scientific Method as Applied to native Labour Problems in Papua, Port Moresby, 1931
- The scientific aspect of the pacification of Papua : presidential address at the meeting of the Australian and New Zealand Association for the Advancement of Science held at Sydney in August 1932, Port Moresby, 1932
- Notes on the Suggested Combination of the Administrations of Papua and New Guinea, 1939

Introductions

- T. F. Unwin, Patrolling in Papua, London: T.Fisher Unwin, 1923
- F. E. Williams, Orokaiva Society, Port Moresby, 1930
- F. E. Williams, Sentiments and Leading Ideas in Native Society, Port Moresby, 1932
- Ivan F. Champion, Across New Guinea from the Fly to the Sepik, London: Constable, 1932
- Lewis Lett, Knights Errant of Papua, Edinburgh: William Blackwood, 1935

Government offices
Preceded by Francis Rickman Barton, acting	Lieutenant-Governor of Papua; 1908–1940	Succeeded by Hubert Leonard Murray, acting
