= ISO 639:s =

List of ISO 639-3 language codes starting with S

This is a list of ISO 639-3 language codes starting with S.

Index | a | b | c | d | e | f | g | h | i | j | k | l | m | n | o | p | q | r | s | t | u | v | w | x | y | z

Abbreviations are used in the table as follows:

- Scope: I = individual language, M = macrolanguage, S = special code
- Type: C = constructed, E = extinct (in recent times), H = historical (distinct from its modern form), L = living, S = special code

Deprecated codes are enclosed in (parentheses).

The column Family contains the generic English name of the language's family or macrolanguage.

ISO 639 codes			Scope/Type	Family	Language names	
639-3	639-1	639-2/B	Scope/Type	Family	Native	ISO name
saa			I/L			Saba
sab			I/L			Buglere
sac			I/L			Meskwaki
sad		sad	I/L			Sandawe
sae			I/L			Sabanê
saf			I/L			Safaliba
sag	sg	sag	I/L	Creole	sängö	Sango
sah		sah	I/L		Саха	Yakut
saj			I/L			Sahu
sak			I/L			Sake
sam		sam	I/E		ܐܪܡܝܐ	Samaritan Aramaic
san	sa	san	M/H	Indo-European	संस्कृतम्	Sanskrit
sao			I/L			Sause
(sap)			I/L			Sanapaná
saq			I/L			Samburu
sar			I/E			Saraveca
sas		sas	I/L			Sasak
sat		sat	I/L		संथाली	Santali
sau			I/L			Saleman
sav			I/L			Saafi-Saafi
saw			I/L			Sawi
sax			I/L			Sa
say			I/L			Saya
saz			I/L			Saurashtra
sba			I/L			Ngambay
sbb			I/L			Simbo
sbc			I/L			Kele (Papua New Guinea)
sbd			I/L			Southern Samo
sbe			I/L			Saliba
sbf			I/L	language isolate	Mikeyir	Chabu; Shabo
sbg			I/L			Seget
sbh			I/L			Sori-Harengan
sbi			I/L			Seti
sbj			I/L			Surbakhal
sbk			I/L			Safwa
sbl			I/L			Botolan Sambal
sbm			I/L			Sagala
sbn			I/L			Sindhi Bhil
sbo			I/L			Sabüm
sbp			I/L			Sangu (Tanzania)
sbq			I/L			Sileibi
sbr			I/L			Sembakung Murut
sbs			I/L			Subiya
sbt			I/L			Kimki
sbu			I/L			Stod Bhoti
sbv			I/H			Sabine
sbw			I/L			Simba
sbx			I/L			Seberuang
sby			I/L			Soli
sbz			I/L			Sara Kaba
(sca)			I/L			Sansu
scb			I/L			Chut
sce			I/L			Dongxiang
scf			I/L			San Miguel Creole French
scg			I/L			Sanggau
sch			I/L	Sino-Tibetan	Khelma; Achep	Sakachep
sci			I/L			Sri Lankan Creole Malay
sck			I/L			Sadri
scl			I/L			Shina
scn		scn	I/L		sicilianu	Sicilian
sco		sco	I/L		Scots	Scots
scp			I/L			Helambu Sherpa; Hyolmo
scq			I/L			Sa'och
scs			I/L		Sahtú Got’ine	North Slavey
sct			I/L	Austroasiatic		Southern Katang
scu			I/L	Sino-Tibetan		Shumcho
scv			I/L			Sheni
scw			I/L			Sha
scx			I/H			Sicel
scz			I/L	Indo-European	Shaetlan	Shaetlan
sda			I/L			Toraja-Sa'dan
sdb			I/L			Shabak
sdc			I/L		sassaresu	Sassarese Sardinian
(sdd)			I/L			Semendo
sde			I/L			Surubu
sdf			I/L			Sarli
sdg			I/L			Savi
sdh			I/L			Southern Kurdish
(sdi)			I/L			Sindang Kelingi
sdj			I/L			Suundi
sdk			I/L			Sos Kundi
sdl			I/L			Saudi Arabian Sign Language
(sdm)			I/L			Semandang
sdn			I/L			Gallurese Sardinian
sdo			I/L			Bukar-Sadung Bidayuh
sdp			I/L	Sino-Tibetan?	Ngnok	Sherdukpen
sdq			I/L			Semandang
sdr			I/L			Oraon Sadri
sds			I/E			Sened
sdt			I/E			Shuadit
sdu			I/L			Sarudu
sdx			I/L			Sibu Melanau
sdz			I/L			Sallands
sea			I/L			Semai
seb			I/L			Shempire Senoufo
sec			I/L	Salishan	sháshíshalh-em	Sechelt; She shashishalhem
sed			I/L			Sedang
see			I/L	Iroquoian	Onõtowáka	Seneca
sef			I/L			Cebaara Senoufo
seg			I/L			Segeju
seh			I/L			Sena
sei			I/L		Cmiique Iitom	Seri
sej			I/L			Sene
sek			I/L		Tsek’ehne	Sekani
sel		sel	I/L		шӧльӄумыт	Selkup
sen			I/L			Nanerigé Sénoufo
seo			I/L			Suarmin
sep			I/L			Sìcìté Sénoufo
seq			I/L			Senara Sénoufo
ser			I/L			Serrano
ses			I/L			Koyraboro Senni Songhai
set			I/L			Sentani
seu			I/L			Serui-Laut
sev			I/L			Nyarafolo Senoufo
sew			I/L			Sewa Bay
sey			I/L			Secoya
sez			I/L			Senthang Chin
sfb			I/L	French Sign?		Langue des signes de Belgique Francophone; French Belgian Sign Language
sfe			I/L			Eastern Subanen
sfm			I/L	Hmong–Mien		Small Flowery Miao
sfs			I/L			South African Sign Language
sfw			I/L			Sehwi
sga		sga	I/H	Indo-European	Goídelc; ᚌᚑᚔᚇᚓᚂᚉ	Old Irish (to 900)
sgb			I/L			Mag-antsi Ayta
sgc			I/L			Kipsigis
sgd			I/L			Surigaonon
sge			I/L			Segai
sgg			I/L			Swiss-German Sign Language
sgh			I/L			Shughni
sgi			I/L			Suga
sgj			I/L			Surgujia
sgk			I/L			Sangkong
(sgl)			I/L			Sanglechi-Ishkashimi
sgm			I/E			Singa
(sgo)			I/L	spurious language		Songa
sgp			I/L	Sino-Tibetan	Singhpaw ga	Singpho
sgr			I/L			Sangisari
sgs			I/L			Samogitian
sgt			I/L			Brokpake
sgu			I/L			Salas
sgw			I/L			Sebat Bet Gurage
sgx			I/L			Sierra Leone Sign Language
sgy			I/L			Sanglechi
sgz			I/L			Sursurunga
sha			I/L			Shall-Zwall
shb			I/L			Ninam
shc			I/L			Sonde
shd			I/L			Kundal Shahi
she			I/L			Sheko
shg			I/L			Shua
shh			I/L		Sosoni'	Shoshoni
shi			I/L		تشلحيت	Tachelhit
shj			I/L			Shatt
shk			I/L			Shilluk
(shl)			I/L			Shendu
shm			I/L			Shahrudi
shn		shn	I/L			Shan
sho			I/L			Shanga
shp			I/L	Panoan	Shipibo	Shipibo-Conibo
shq			I/L			Sala
shr			I/L			Shi
shs			I/L	Salishan	Secwépemctsín	Shuswap; Secwepemctsín
sht			I/E			Shasta
shu			I/L	Arabic		Chadian Arabic
shv			I/L			Shehri
shw			I/L			Shwai
shx			I/L			She
shy			I/L		Tachawit	Tachawit
shz			I/L			Syenara Senoufo
sia			I/E			Akkala Sami
sib			I/L			Sebop
(sic)			I/L			Malinguat
sid		sid	I/L		Sidámo	Sidamo
sie			I/L			Simaa
sif			I/L			Siamou
sig			I/L			Paasaal
sih			I/L			Sîshëë; Zire
sii			I/L			Shom Peng
sij			I/L			Numbami
sik			I/L			Sikiana
sil			I/L			Tumulung Sisaala
sim			I/L			Mende (Papua New Guinea)
sin	si	sin	I/L	Indo-European	සිංහල	Sinhala; Sinhalese
sip			I/L			Sikkimese
siq			I/L			Sonia
sir			I/L			Siri
sis			I/E			Siuslaw
siu			I/L			Sinagen
siv			I/L			Sumariup
siw			I/L			Siwai
six			I/L			Sumau
siy			I/L			Sivandi
siz			I/L			Siwi
sja			I/L			Epena
sjb			I/L			Sajau Basap
sjc			I/L	Sino-Tibetan	邵将语	Shaojiang Chinese
sjd			I/L		самь	Kildin Sami
sje			I/L			Pite Sami
sjg			I/L			Assangori
sjk			I/E			Kemi Sami
sjl			I/L	Sino-Tibetan?		Miji; Sajalong
sjm			I/L			Mapun
sjn			I/C			Sindarin
sjo			I/L		ᠰᡞᠪᡝ ᡤᡞᠰᡠᠨ	Xibe
sjp			I/L			Surjapuri
sjr			I/L			Siar-Lak
sjs			I/E			Senhaja De Srair
sjt			I/L			Ter Sami
sju			I/L			Ume Sami
sjw			I/L		Shaawanwaʼ	Shawnee
ska			I/L			Skagit
skb			I/L			Saek
skc			I/L			Ma Manda
skd			I/L			Southern Sierra Miwok
ske			I/L			Seke (Vanuatu)
skf			I/L			Sakirabiá
skg			I/L			Sakalava Malagasy
skh			I/L			Sikule
ski			I/L			Sika
skj			I/L			Seke (Nepal)
(skk)			I/L			Sok
(skl)			I/L			Selako
skm			I/L			Kutong
skn			I/L			Kolibugan Subanon
sko			I/L			Seko Tengah
skp			I/L			Sekapan
skq			I/L			Sininkere
skr			I/L			Saraiki; Seraiki
sks			I/L			Maia
skt			I/L			Sakata
sku			I/L			Sakao
skv			I/L			Skou
skw			I/E			Skepi Creole Dutch
skx			I/L			Seko Padang
sky			I/L			Sikaiana
skz			I/L			Sekar
(slb)			I/L			Kahumamahon Saluan
slc			I/L			Sáliba
sld			I/L			Sissala
sle			I/L			Sholaga
slf			I/L			Swiss-Italian Sign Language
slg			I/L			Selungai Murut
slh			I/L			Southern Puget Sound Salish
sli			I/L			Lower Silesian
slj			I/L			Salumá
slk	sk	slo	I/L	Indo-European	slovenčina	Slovak
sll			I/L			Salt-Yui
slm			I/L			Pangutaran Sama
sln			I/E			Salinan
slp			I/L			Lamaholot
(slq)			I/E	spurious language		Salchuq
slr			I/L		Salar	Salar
sls			I/L			Singapore Sign Language
slt			I/L			Sila
slu			I/L			Selaru
slv	sl	slv	I/L	Indo-European	slovenščina	Slovenian
slw			I/L			Sialum
slx			I/L			Salampasu
sly			I/L			Selayar
slz			I/L			Ma'ya
sma		sma	I/L		saemi	Southern Sami
smb			I/L			Simbari
smc			I/E			Som
(smd)			I/L			Sama
sme	se	sme	I/L	Uralic	sámi	Northern Sami
smf			I/L			Auwe
smg			I/L			Simbali
smh			I/L			Samei
smj		smj	I/L		sámi	Lule Sami
smk			I/L			Bolinao
sml			I/L			Central Sama
smm			I/L			Musasa
smn		smn	I/L		säämi	Inari Sami
smo	sm	smo	I/L	Austronesian	gagana Samoa	Samoan
smp			I/E			Samaritan
smq			I/L			Samo
smr			I/L			Simeulue
sms		sms	I/L		sää'm	Skolt Sami
smt			I/L			Simte
smu			I/E			Somray
smv			I/L			Samvedi
smw			I/L			Sumbawa
smx			I/L			Samba
smy			I/L			Semnani
smz			I/L			Simeku
sna	sn	sna	I/L	Niger–Congo	chiShona	Shona
(snb)			I/L			Sebuyau
snc			I/L			Sinaugoro
snd	sd	snd	I/L	Indo-European	سندھی	Sindhi
sne			I/L			Bau Bidayuh
snf			I/L			Noon
sng			I/L			Sanga (Democratic Republic of Congo)
(snh)			I/E	spurious language		Shinabo
sni			I/E			Sensi
snj			I/L			Riverain Sango
snk		snk	I/L		Soninkanxaane	Soninke
snl			I/L			Sangil
snm			I/L			Southern Ma'di
snn			I/L			Siona
sno			I/L			Snohomish
snp			I/L			Siane
snq			I/L			Sangu (Gabon)
snr			I/L			Sihan
sns			I/L			Nahavaq; South West Bay
snu			I/L			Senggi; Viid
snv			I/L			Sa'ban
snw			I/L			Selee
snx			I/L			Sam
sny			I/L			Saniyo-Hiyewe
snz			I/L			Kou
soa			I/L			Thai Song
sob			I/L			Sobei
soc			I/L			So (Democratic Republic of Congo)
sod			I/L			Songoora
soe			I/L			Songomeno
sog		sog	I/H			Sogdian
soh			I/L			Aka
soi			I/L			Sonha
soj			I/L			Soi
sok			I/L			Sokoro
sol			I/L			Solos
som	so	som	I/L	Afro-Asiatic	Soomaaliga	Somali
soo			I/L			Songo
sop			I/L			Songe
soq			I/L			Kanasi
sor			I/L			Somrai
sos			I/L			Seeku
sot	st	sot	I/L	Niger–Congo	Sesotho	Southern Sotho
sou			I/L			Southern Thai
sov			I/L			Sonsorol
sow			I/L			Sowanda
sox			I/L			Swo
soy			I/L			Miyobe
soz			I/L			Temi
spa	es	spa	I/L	Indo-European	español	Castilian; Spanish
spb			I/L			Sepa (Indonesia)
spc			I/L			Sapé
spd			I/L			Saep
spe			I/L			Sepa (Papua New Guinea)
spg			I/L			Sian
spi			I/L			Saponi
spk			I/L			Sengo
spl			I/L			Selepet
spm			I/L			Akukem
spn			I/L	Mascoian		Sanapaná
spo			I/L			Spokane
spp			I/L			Supyire Senoufo
spq			I/L			Loreto-Ucayali Spanish
spr			I/L			Saparua
sps			I/L			Saposa
spt			I/L			Spiti Bhoti
spu			I/L	Austroasiatic		Sapuan
spv			I/L			Kosli; Sambalpuri
spx			I/H			South Picene
spy			I/L			Sabaot
sqa			I/L			Shama-Sambuga
sqh			I/L			Shau
sqi	sq	alb	M/L	Indo-European	Shqip	Albanian
sqk			I/L			Albanian Sign Language
sqm			I/L	Niger–Congo?		Suma
sqn			I/E			Susquehannock
sqo			I/L			Sorkhei
sqq			I/L			Sou
sqr			I/H			Siculo Arabic
sqs			I/L			Sri Lankan Sign Language
sqt			I/L			Soqotri
squ			I/L	Salishan	Sḵwx̱wú7mesh sníchim	Squamish; Sḵwx̱wú7mesh sníchim
sqx			I/L			Kufr Qassem Sign Language (KQSL)
sra			I/L			Saruga
srb			I/L			Sora
src			I/L			Logudorese Sardinian
srd	sc	srd	M/L	Indo-European	sardu	Sardinian
sre			I/L			Sara
srf			I/L			Nafi
srg			I/L			Sulod
srh			I/L			Sarikoli
sri			I/L			Siriano
(srj)			I/L			Serawai
srk			I/L			Serudung Murut
srl			I/L			Isirawa
srm			I/L		saamáka	Saramaccan
srn		srn	I/L		Sranang Tongo	Sranan Tongo
sro			I/L			Campidanese Sardinian
srp	sr	srp (scc)	I/L	Indo-European	српски / srpski	Serbian
srq			I/L			Sirionó
srr		srr	I/L			Serer
srs			I/L	Na-Dené	Tsúùtʼínà Gūnáhà	Tsuut'ina
srt			I/L			Sauri
sru			I/L			Suruí
srv			I/L			Southern Sorsoganon
srw			I/L			Serua
srx			I/L			Sirmauri
sry			I/L			Sera
srz			I/L			Shahmirzadi
ssb			I/L			Southern Sama
ssc			I/L			Suba-Simbiti
ssd			I/L			Siroi
sse			I/L			Balangingi; Bangingih Sama
ssf			I/L			Thao
ssg			I/L			Seimat
ssh			I/L			Shihhi Arabic
ssi			I/L			Sansi
ssj			I/L			Sausi
ssk			I/L	Sino-Tibetan	sunnampakad	Sunam
ssl			I/L			Western Sisaala
ssm			I/L			Semnam
ssn			I/L			Waata
sso			I/L			Sissano
ssp			I/L			Spanish Sign Language
ssq			I/L			So'a
ssr			I/L			Swiss-French Sign Language
sss			I/L			Sô
sst			I/L			Sinasina
ssu			I/L			Susuami
ssv			I/L			Shark Bay
ssw	ss	ssw	I/L	Niger–Congo	siSwati	Swati
ssx			I/L			Samberigi
ssy			I/L			Saho
ssz			I/L			Sengseng
sta			I/L			Settla
stb			I/L			Northern Subanen
(stc)			I/L			Santa Cruz
std			I/L	unclassified / Ongan?		Sentinel
ste			I/L			Liana-Seti
stf			I/L			Seta
stg			I/L			Trieng
sth			I/L			Shelta
sti			I/L			Bulo Stieng
stj			I/L			Matya Samo
stk			I/L			Arammba
stl			I/L			Stellingwerfs
stm			I/L			Setaman
stn			I/L			Owa
sto			I/L		Isga Iʼabi	Stoney
stp			I/L			Southeastern Tepehuan
stq			I/L		Seeltersk	Saterfriesisch
str			I/L		xʷsenəčqən	Straits Salish
sts			I/L			Shumashti
stt			I/L			Budeh Stieng
stu			I/L			Samtao
stv			I/L			Silt'e
stw			I/L			Satawalese
sty			I/L	Turkic		Siberian Tatar
sua			I/L			Sulka
sub			I/L			Suku
suc			I/L			Western Subanon
sue			I/L			Suena
(suf)			I/L	spurious language		Tarpia
sug			I/L			Suganga
(suh)			I/L			Suba
sui			I/L			Suki
suj			I/L	Niger–Congo?		Shubi
suk		suk	I/L			Sukuma
(sul)			I/L			Surigaonon
(sum)			I/L			Sumo-Mayangna
sun	su	sun	I/L	Austronesian	basa Sunda	Sundanese
suo			I/L	Skou		Bouni
suq			I/L			Suri; Tirmaga-Chai Suri
sur			I/L			Mwaghavul
sus		sus	I/L			Susu
sut			I/E			Subtiaba
(suu)			I/L			Sungkai
suv			I/L	Sino-Tibetan?	pɯh˧˩ ɣut˥	Puroik
suw			I/L			Sumbwa
sux		sux	I/H		eme-ĝir	Sumerian
suy			I/L			Suyá
suz			I/L	Sino-Tibetan	सुनुवार	Sunwar
sva			I/L		ლუშნუ	Svan
svb			I/L			Ulau-Suain
svc			I/L			Vincentian Creole English
sve			I/L			Serili
svk			I/L			Slovakian Sign Language
svm			I/L			Slavomolisano
(svr)			I/L	spurious language		Savara
svs			I/L			Savosavo
svx			I/H			Skalvian
swa	sw	swa	M/L	Niger–Congo	kiswahili	Swahili (macrolanguage)
swb			I/L		شِقُمُرِ	Maore Comorian
swc			I/L			Congo Swahili
swe	sv	swe	I/L	Indo-European	svenska	Swedish
swf			I/L			Sere
swg			I/L		Schwäbisch	Swabian
swh			I/L			Kiswahili; Swahili (individual language)
swi			I/L			Sui
swj			I/L			Sira
swk			I/L			Malawi Sena
swl			I/L		svenskt teckenspråk	Swedish Sign Language
swm			I/L			Samosa
swn			I/L			Sawknah
swo			I/L			Shanenawa
swp			I/L			Suau
swq			I/L			Sharwa
swr			I/L			Saweru
sws			I/L			Seluwasan
swt			I/L			Sawila
swu			I/L			Suwawa
swv			I/L			Shekhawati
sww			I/E			Sowa
swx			I/L			Suruahá
swy			I/L			Sarua
sxb			I/L			Suba
sxc			I/H	unclassified		Sicanian
sxe			I/L			Sighu
sxg			I/L			Shixing; Shuhi
sxk			I/E			Southern Kalapuya
sxl			I/E			Selian
sxm			I/L			Samre
sxn			I/L			Sangir
sxo			I/H			Sorothaptic
sxr			I/L			Saaroa
sxs			I/L			Sasaru
sxu			I/L		Sächsisch	Upper Saxon
sxw			I/L			Saxwe Gbe
sya			I/L			Siang
syb			I/L			Central Subanen
syc		syc	I/H			Classical Syriac
syi			I/L			Seki
syk			I/L			Sukur
syl			I/L	Indo-European	ꠍꠤꠟꠐꠤ	Sylheti
sym			I/L			Maya Samo
syn			I/L			Senaya
syo			I/L			Suoy
syr		syr	M/L		ܣܘܪܝܐܝܐ	Syriac
sys			I/L			Sinyar
syw			I/L			Kagate
syx			I/L	Niger–Congo		Samay
syy			I/L			Al-Sayyid Bedouin Sign Language
sza			I/L			Semelai
szb			I/L			Ngalum
szc			I/L			Semaq Beri
(szd)			I/E			Seru
sze			I/L			Seze
szg			I/L			Sengele
(szk)			I/L			Sizaki
szl			I/L	Indo-European	Ślůnsko godka	Silesian
szn			I/L			Sula
szp			I/L			Suabo
szs			I/L			Solomon Islands Sign Language
szv			I/L			Isu (Fako Division)
szw			I/L			Sawai
szy			I/L	Austronesian		Sakizaya

== Sources ==
- "ISO 639-2 Registration Authority". Library of Congress.
- "ISO 639-3 Registration Authority". SIL International.
- Lewis, M. Paul; Simons, Gary F.; Fennig, Charles D., eds. (2016). "Ethnologue: Languages of the World" (19th ed.). Dallas, Texas: SIL International.
