= Nafanan language =

Senufo language of Ghana and Ivory Coast

Nafaanra
- Native to: Ghana, Ivory Coast
- Region: North-west corner of the Bono Region in Ghana, east of Bondoukou in Ivory Coast
- Ethnicity: Nafana
- Native speakers: 89,000 in Ghana (2017) "Few" in Côte d'Ivoire
- Language family: Niger–Congo?: Atlantic–Congo; Senufo; Southern; Nafaanra

Language codes
- ISO 639-3: nfr
- Glottolog: nafa1258
- Nafaanra, some neighbouring languages, and other Senufo languages.

Nafaanra (sometimes written Nafaara, pronounced [nafãːra]), also known as Nafanan or Nafana, is a Senufo language spoken in northwest Ghana, along the border with Ivory Coast, east of Bondoukou. It is spoken by approximately 90,000 people. Its speakers call themselves Nafana, but others call them Banda or Mfantera. Like other Senufo languages, Nafaanra is a tonal language. It is somewhat of an outlier in the Senufo language group, with the geographically-closest relatives, the Southern Senufo Tagwana–Djimini languages, approximately 200 kilometres (120 mi) to the west, on the other side of Comoé National Park.

The basic word order is subject–object–verb, like Latin and Japanese. Like other Niger–Congo languages, it has a noun class system, with nouns classified according to five different classes, which also affects pronouns, adjectives and copulas. The phonology features a distinction between the length of vowels and whether they are oral or nasal (as in French or Portuguese). There are also three distinct tones, a feature shared with the other Senufo languages. Nafaanra grammar features both tense and aspect which are marked with particles. Numbers are mainly formed by adding cardinal numbers to the number 5 and by multiplying the numbers 10, 20 and 100.

== Geography and demography ==
Nafaanra is bordered by Kulango languages to the west and southeast, while Deg (a Gur language) is found to the north and east. The closest eastern and western neighbour is the Mande language Ligbi. Southeast and south of Nafaanra and Ligbi, the Akan language Abron is spoken.

The Nafana people live in the north-west corner of the Brong-Ahafo Region of Ghana, concentrated mainly in Sampa (capital of the Jaman North district) and Banda. There are two dialectal variants of Nafaanra: Pantera of Banda, and Fantera of Sampa. Bendor-Samuel gives a 79% cognate relationship on the Swadesh list between the two dialects, meaning that they have many basic words in common. The Banda dialect is considered central. The terms "Fantera" and "Pantera" come from other peoples and are considered pejorative by the Nafana.

The Nafana people say that they come from a village called Kakala in Ivory Coast. Their oral history says that some of their people are still there, and if they go back they will not be allowed to leave again. They arrived in the Banda area after the Ligbi people, who came from Begho (Bigu, Bighu) to the area in the early 17th century.

According to Ethnologue, as of 2005, many Nafana are bilingual in Twi, the regional lingua franca, to some extent. Using the ILR scale, 50% of Nafana have limited working proficiency in Twi (Note: Speaking 2 (Limited Working Proficiency): "Able to satisfy routine social demands and limited work requirements."), while 20% have general professional proficiency (Note: Speaking 3 (General Professional Proficiency): "Able to speak the language with sufficient structural accuracy and vocabulary to participate effectively in most formal and informal conversations in practical, social and professional topics."). The remaining 30% have either elementary proficiency (15%) or no proficiency at all (15%). 15–25% of the Nafana people are literate in Twi, whereas only 1–5% are literate in Nafaanra.

65 Dompo people living in the close vicinity of Banda have shifted to Nafaanra. Dompo is their first language, thought to be extinct until a fieldwork trip by Blench in 1998 proved the contrary.

=== Classification ===
Maurice Delafosse was the first linguist to mention Nafaanra, calling it "a much dispersed Senufo tribe" in 1904. Westermann in his classification of West-African languages, also grouped Nafaanra with Senufo, apparently based on the word list found in Rapp. This classification is confirmed by Bendor-Samuel, who bases his internal Senufo classification on the comparative word lists in Swadesh et al.

It is less clear which particular Senufo branch Nafaanra is most closely related to. Bendor-Samuel gives a 60% cognate relationship based on the Swadesh list with "Tenere" (a western Senari dialect), 59% with "Central Senari" (the Senari dialect spoken around Korhogo), and 43% with the non-Senufo languages Mo (or Deg), Kabre (or Kabiye), and Dogon. The relatively low scores of about 60% point to a rather distant relationship. Likewise, Mensah and Tchagbale establish an intercomprehensibility factor of 38% with "Tyebaara" (Senari), concluding that Nafaanra is only distantly related to this dialect. Nafaanra has been tentatively linked to Palaka (Kpalaga) by Manessy, whereas Mills suggests a relation with the southern Tagwana–Djimini branch.

== Sounds ==
=== Vowels ===
Nafaanra has seven oral and five nasalized vowels. A difference in vowel length can make a difference in meaning, as in sɛ, "to go", vs. sɛɛ, "fetish" or o, "we" vs. oo, "we will". Similarly, the phonemic contrastiveness of nasalization can be seen in sii, "to be giving birth," vs. sĩĩ, "to build". The vowel system closely resembles that of other Senufo languages. It is like the two Northern Senufo languages Supyire and Mamara in having only five nasal against seven oral vowels. In the orthography, nasalization of vowels is marked by adding the letter "n" after the vowel.

Phonetic inventory of vowels in Nafaanra
	Front	Central	Back
Close	i • ĩ		u • ũ
Close-mid	e		o
Open-mid	ɛ • ɛ̃		ɔ • ɔ̃
Open		a • ã	

=== Consonants ===
In the table below, orthographic symbols are included between angled brackets if they differ from the IPA symbols. Note especially the use of "j" for IPA [ɟ] and the use of "y" for IPA [j], common in African orthographies.

Phonetic inventory of consonants in Nafaanra in IPA notation
		labial	alveolar	palatal	velar	labial- velar	glottal
nasal		m	n	ɲ ⟨ny⟩	ŋ	ŋ͡m	
plosive	voiceless	p	t	c ⟨ch⟩	k	k͡p	
plosive	voiced	b	d	ɟ ⟨j⟩	ɡ	ɡ͡b	
fricative	voiceless	f	s	ç ⟨sh⟩			h
fricative	voiced	v	z				
trill			r				
approximant			l	j ⟨y⟩		w	

The consonant system of Nafaanra is fairly similar to that of other Senufo languages. Nafaanra has only one attested palatal fricative, /ç/, occupying an intermediate position between the Northern Senufo languages (Mamara, Supyire) that have both /ç/ and its voiced counterpart /ʝ/, and the Central and Southern Senufo languages (e.g. Karaboro, Senari, Djimini) that have no palatal fricatives at all.

=== Tone ===
Like the other Senufo languages, Nafaanra has three contrastive tones: High, Mid and Low. Tone is normally not marked in the Nafaanra orthography. Examples are:

- kúfɔ̀ "yam" (High-Low)
- dama "two pesewas (coin)" (Mid)
- màŋà "rope" (Low)

The Mid tone sometimes has a rising feature, the High tone sometimes is subject to downstep (a tonal process resulting in a High tone being realised lower than a preceding High tone), and an upstep is also found. The "rising feature" of Mid may be related to the fact that two different Mid tones are found in some other Senufo languages (e.g. Sucite and Supyire). The High tone downstep (signified by a raised exclamation mark) occurs in the following context:

we ^{!} sɛ
he FUT go
"he will go".

It is likely that the tonal lowering seen in this particular example is related to the low tone nasal prefix found in future tense constructions in some other Senufo languages. In fact, Supyire shows a similar phenomenon in future tense constructions with a direct object (in other future tense constructions, a low tone nasal is found). In general however, downstep is more widespread than in Supyire; a similar phenomenon is found in Palaka, Tagwana, and Djimini.

An upstep is found in the imperative tense of high tone verbs:

ki tɔ
it close
"close it!"

== Grammar ==
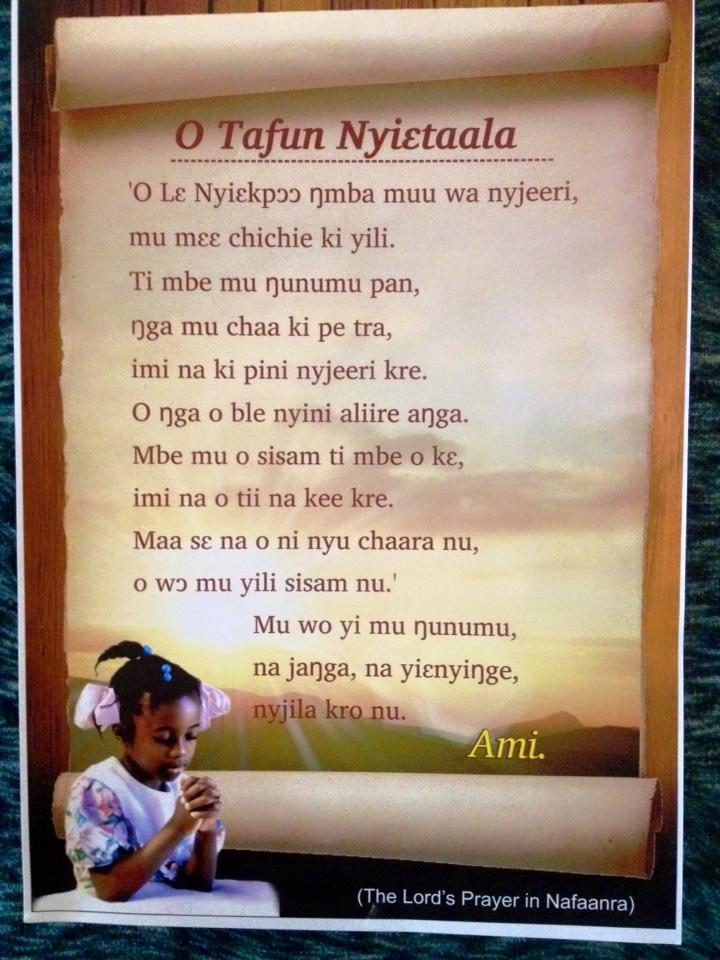
The Lord's Prayer in Nafanan

The Nafaanra syllable comprises a vowel and a maximum of three consonants. A nasal consonant may occur as a syllable on its own, in which case it is called a syllabic nasal. The basic syllable structure can be rendered as (C_{1})(C_{2})V(C_{3}), with a preference for CV and CVV. Position C_{1} may contain any consonant, although word-initial /r/ does not occur. Position C_{2} may contain only trills (/r/) or approximants (/w, l, j/). Position C_{3} may contain only nasals (/m n ɲ ŋ/), in which case the syllable as a whole is nasalized.

Senufo languages have a typical Niger–Congo noun class (or gender) system. Suffixes on nouns mark membership of one of the five noun genders. Pronouns, adjectives and copulas reflect the noun gender of the nominal they refer to. Although none of the sources on Nafaanra provides any details, it can be inferred from a brief word list given by Jordan that the Nafaanra noun class system resembles that of other Senufo languages.

The basic word order in Nafaanra is subject–object–verb, as can be seen in the following sentence:

bibilɛ ná pé nya
boys PAST them see
"The boys saw them"

=== Personal pronouns ===
Jordan lists the following list of pronouns, commenting, "Although the pronoun system appears quite simple, it becomes complicated because all the tenses are shown by a combination of pronoun plus particle."

Nafaanra personal pronouns
Jordan 1980a:6	Singular	Plural
1st person	ni	o
2nd person	mu	e
3rd person	u	pe

=== Tense and aspect ===
Tense and aspect in Nafaanra are generally encoded in two places: in preverbal particles and on the verb form. Nafaanra has past, recent past, and future tenses and continuative aspect. In a simple sentence, the order of the various constituents can be rendered as follows: SUBJECT • (NEGATION) • (TENSE) • (ASPECT) • VERB . When the negative suffix -n is present, no fusing of preverbal particles takes place. Nafaanra additionally expresses some tense/aspect matters by use of certain time adverbs and auxiliary verbs.

Past tense is marked by the preverbal particle ná (high tone, as opposed to the low tone continuative particle). Future tense is marked by the particle wè. Simple sentences without a preverbal tense particle are interpreted as recent past (sometimes called immediate). If aspect marking is absent, simple sentences are generally interpreted as completive.

kòfí ná sɛ́
Kofi PAST go-COMPL
"Kofi went"—PAST

kòfí wè sɛ́
Kofi FUT go-COMPL
"Kofi will go"—FUTURE

kòfí sɛ́
Kofi go-COMPL
"Kofi just went"—RECENT PAST (no marking)

Continuative aspect (sometimes called progressive) denotes an action that is ongoing or repetitive. Continuative aspect is usually marked both by a preverbal particle nà (low tone) and by a change of the verb form. The verb sɛ́, "go" used in the sentences below has the continuative form síé. In sentences where both past tense particle ná and continuative particle nà are present, they combine to give the fused particle náà. In sentences in the recent past tense, the preverbal continuative particle is omitted and continuative aspect is shown only on the verb.

kòfí náà síé
Kofi PAST+CONT go-CONT
"Kofi was going"—CONT + PAST

kòfí wè nà síé
Kofi FUT CONT go-CONT
"Kofi will be going"—CONT + FUTURE

kòfí síé
Kofi go-CONT
"Kofi is going"—CONT + RECENT PAST

Two classes of verbs can be differentiated on the basis of their behaviour in aspectually marked sentences. One class of verbs has two aspectually distinct forms, as seen in the above example sentences. Another class of verbs does not distinguish aspect—one and the same form shows up in both completive and continuative aspect. In sentences in the recent past tense, this gives rise to ambiguity since the preverbal continuative particle is omitted there. Thus, the sentence kòfí blú can be interpreted in the following two ways:

kòfí blú
Kofi swim-CONT
"Kofi is swimming"—CONT + RECENT PAST

kòfí blú
Kofi swim-COMPL
"Kofi just swam"—RECENT PAST (no marking)

Considerable fusion takes place between pronominal subjects and the preverbal particles. For example, ná "PAST" fuses with pé, "they", to produce prá sɛ́ (they-PAST go-completive), "they went", and wè "FUTURE" fuses with pé in píè sɛ́ (they-FUTURE go-completive), "they will go".

=== Questions ===
Questions can be formed in several ways in Nafaanra. Basic yes–no questions are constructed by adding a sentence-final question marker rá. Constituent questions (sometimes called Wh-questions or question word questions) are doubly marked. They contain a sentence-initial question word and are marked with a sentence-final question marker hin.

u pan rá
he come Q
"Has he come?"—basic yes–no-question

ŋgi wra nya hin
what he+PAST see Q
"What did he see?"—constituent question

=== Numbers ===
The cardinal numbers without tonal marking are presented below; where possible, the tone pattern is added based on the list in Rapp. Numbers six to nine are derived by adding the numbers one to four to kɔɔ, "five", by means of the conjunction na.

The cardinal numbers of Nafaanra without tonal marking
No.	Nafaanra	Supyire	Notes
1	núnu	nìŋkìn	
2	shíín	shùùnnì	
3	táárɛ̀	tàànrè	Mpre: eta
4	jíjirɛ̀	sìcyɛ̀ɛ̀rè	
5	kúnɔ	kaŋkuro	
6	kɔ́ɔ̀-ná-nù	baa-nì	5 + 1
7	kɔ́ɔ̀-na-shin	baa-shùùnnì	5 + 2
8	kɔ́ɔ̀-ná-tárɛ̀	baa-tàànrè	5 + 3
9	kɔ́ɔ̀-ná-jirɛ	baa-rìcyɛ̀ɛ̀rè	5 + 4
10	kɛ́	kɛ	
20	fúlo	benjaaga	
30	fúlo na kɛ	benjaaga na kɛ	20 + 10
40	fúloe shiin		20 × 2
50	fúloe shiin na kɛ		20 × 2 + 10, Rapp féleshen-ná-kɛ
60	fuloe taarɛ		20 × 3, however compare Rapp félèko-a-ná-nò
70	fuloe taarɛ na kɛ		20 × 3 + 10, Rapp féleko-náshèn
80	fuloe jijirɛ		20 × 4, Rapp féleko-ná-tàrɛ
90	fuloe jijirɛ na kɛ		20 × 4 + 10, Rapp félèko-ná-nyèrɛ
100	lafaa		Mpre: ke-lafa (Rapp 1933)
200	lafɛɛ shiin		
400	lafɛɛ jijirɛ		
1000	kagbenge nunu		Rapp láfâ-kɛĭ (100 × 10) or káboŋge
|2000	kagbenge shiin		

The numbers 11–19 are formed by adding 1–9 to 10 by means of the conjunction mbɔ, e.g. kɛmbɔnunu, "eleven", kɛmbɔkunɔ, "fifteen". In the tens and higher, the Nafaanra and Supyire systems diverge. Multiplication of fulo, "twenty," and addition of kɛ, "ten", (by means of the conjunction ná) is used to form the 30–90 tens. Perhaps surprisingly, there are considerable differences between Rapp (1933) and Jordan (1980) here. In Rapp's 60, 70 and 80, féle seems to be used to mark ten, which conjoined with 6, 7 and 8 forms 60, 70 and 80.

Rapp (1933) compares the Nafaanra numerals for three (táárɛ) and hundred (lafaa) with eta and ke-lafa from Mpre, a hitherto unclassified language from Ghana. The Mpre eta is Kwa-like (cf. Brong esã, Ga etɛ), whereas the Nafaanra form táárɛ is transparently related to the forms found in the other (non-Kwa) Senufo languages (e.g. Supyire tàànrè). Nafaanra lafaa "hundred" is a typical Kwa numeral and is most probably borrowed from one of the surrounding Kwa languages (cf. Dangme làfá, Gonja kì-làfá, Ewe alafá). Rapp's implication of affinity between Mpre and Nafaanra seems therefore unwarranted at this level.

Morphophonological alternations occur here and there, most notably the reduction of kúnɔ, "five" to kɔ́ɔ̀ (preserving the tone pattern) and the change from lafaa to lafɛɛ in the hundreds.

=== Colour words ===
There are 3 to 4 basic colors in Nafanan. The three basic colour words of Nafaanra are: wɔɔ, "black", finge, "white", and ɲiɛ, "red". As with adjectives in Senufo languages, the form of the colour words reflects the noun class of the noun that is modified.

- wɔɔ—ki wɔ "it is black"
- finge—ki finge "it is white"
- ɲiɛ—ki ɲina "it is red"

The cognate forms in closely related Supyire are -ɲyɛ-, "red; warm colored", and -fyìn-, "white; light colored", in Supyire. These adjectives are related to the respective verbs fíníŋɛ́, "be white; whiten" and ɲááŋá, "be red; redden", which in turn are causative forms of the now defunct verbs fini,"be white" and ɲana, "be red".

== Sample sentences ==
Sample Nafaanra sentences from the SIL:

mùùrà kà ní čàà mè gbú mè é nyìè tɛ́ɛ́ mè kí lóó
story some I want and-FUT beat and-FUT your ear put and-FUT it hear
"I want to tell a story for you to hear."

yɛ́ngè nà kòmó ǹdrá
true that hyena hide-COMPL
"It's true that the hyena hid himself."

ké bĺè kà kpáhù wá
it day some frog not-there
"On a certain day the frog wasn't here."

ẃrè ǹnà pè kúú
he not-CONT them kill-CONT
"He wasn't killing them."

ná múúrò ḿnà kàà mà ná yo mà
if fish you-PAST-CONT chew-CONT you-not past say-COMPL that
"If you had been eating fish you would not have said that."

== Research ==
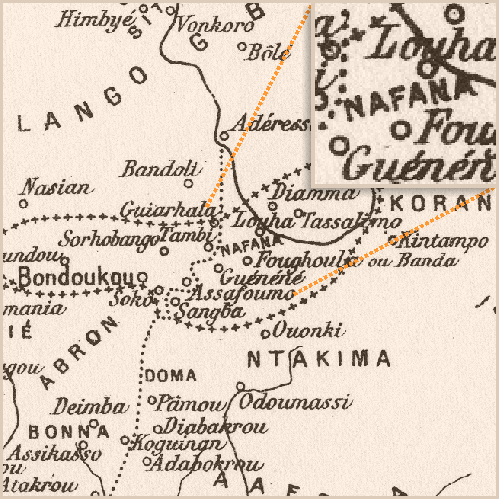
Fragment of Delafosse's (1904) linguistic map highlighting Nafaanra ("Nafana") in the borderland of Ivory Coast and Ghana. Bonduku is found on the left.

There is relatively little published on or in the Nafaanra language. The first linguistic publication to mention Nafaanra is Delafosse (1904), containing some notes on the Nafana people and a fairly extensive comparative Senufo word list, though it lacked any proper tonal marking. Rapp (1933) is an appendix to an article on the Kulango language containing a German-Nafaanra (Nafana-Sprache) word list of around 100 items, gathered during a stay of four hours at Sampa. Rapp notes in passing that special attention was paid to the marking of the tones.

After a period of silence on Nafaanra, Painter (1966) appeared, consisting of basic word lists of the Pantera and Fantera dialects. The SIL linguist Dean Jordan published an article on Nafaanra discourse in 1978, and together with his wife Carol Jordan has produced a translation of the New Testament, which appeared in 1984. The whole bible was translated in 2015. Kropp-Dakubu's 1980 West African language data sheets vol II contains a few pages on Nafaanra put together in the late seventies by Dean and Carol Jordan, including a phonology, a list of nouns, a list of pronouns, a list of numbers, and some example sentences; tones are not marked. A more detailed phonology of Nafaanra by Jordan, also containing a Swadesh list, appeared in 1980. Several books of Nafana folk tales have been published by the Summer Institute of Linguistics. Mensah and Tchagbale in their 1983 linguistic atlas of Ivory Coast include a comparative Senufo word list of about 120 items; Nafaanra is present under the name "Nafara of Bondoukou". Hartell published an orthography of Nafaanra, lacking tonal marking, in 1993. The area where Nafaanra is spoken has been the subject of recent archaeological-anthropological studies.

== Sources ==
=== Primary sources ===
- Delafosse, Maurice (1904). Vocabulaires comparatifs de plus de 60 langues ou dialectes parlés à la Côte d'Ivoire et dans les régions limitrophes (avec des notes linguistiques et ethnologiques, une bibliographie et une carte) (in French). E. Leroux.
- International Bible Society (1984): Nyiɛkpɔɔ nyu nunu fɔŋgɔ.
- Jordan, Dean (1978). "Nafaara tense-aspect in the folk tale". In Grimes, Joseph Evans (ed.). Papers on discourse. Summer Institute of Linguistics. pp. 84–90. ISBN 0-88312-061-5. OCLC 4516192.
- Jordan, Carol; Jordan, Dean (1980a). "Nafaara". In Kropp-Dakubu, Mary Esther (ed.). West African Language Data Sheets. Vol. II. West African Linguistic Society, African Studies Centre. pp. 138–143.
- Jordan, Dean (1980b). Collected field reports on the phonology of Nafaara. Collected language notes. Institute of African Studies, University of Ghana.
- Painter, Colin (1966) Word lists of two Senufo dialects: Fantera et Pantera. Legon: University of Ghana. (30p)
- Rapp, Eugen Ludwig (1933). "Der Einfluss der Migration auf die Sprache". Migration und kulturelle Diversität [The Náfana language in Ivory Coast and Gold Coast] (in German). Vol. 36–3. Mitteilungen des Seminars für Orientalische Sprachen (M.S.O.S.). pp. 66–69. doi:10.3726/978-3-653-04688-5/10. ISBN 9783631652206.

=== Secondary sources ===
- Bendor-Samuel, John T. (1971). "Niger–Congo: Gur". In Sebeok, Thomas; Berry, Jack (eds.). Linguistics in sub-saharan Africa. The Hauge/Paris: De Gruyter Mouton. pp. 141–178. doi:10.1515/9783111562520-007. ISBN 978-3-11-156252-0.
- Blench, Roger (1999). Recent Field Work in Ghana: Report on Dompo and a note on Mpre.
- Carlson, Robert (1994). A Grammar of Supyire. Berlin: De Gruyter Mouton. doi:10.1515/9783110883053. ISBN 3-11-014057-8. OCLC 30895666.
- Hartell, Rhonda L. (1993). The Alphabets of Africa. Dakar: UNESCO and SIL. OCLC 464050942.
- Manessy, Gabriel (1981). "Les langues voltaïques". In Perrot, Jean; Leiper Kane Collection, Thomas (eds.). Les langues dans le monde ancien et moderne (in French). Vol. I. Paris: Éditions du Centre national de la recherche scientifique. ISBN 2-222-01720-3. OCLC 9946042.
- Mensah, Emmanuel N. A.; Tchagbale, Zakari (1983). Atlas des langues gur de Côte d'Ivoire (in French). Abidjan, Paris: Agence de coopération culturelle et technique / Institut de linguistique appliquée. OCLC 492982594.
- Mills, Elizabeth (1984). Senoufo phonology, discourse to syllable (a prosodic approach). Dallas, TX: Summer Institute of Linguistics. ISBN 0-88312-087-9. ISSN 1040-0850. OCLC 11484538.
- Stahl, Ann (2004). "Making History in Banda: Reflections on the Construction of Africa's Past". Historical Archaeology. 38 (1): 50–65. doi:10.1007/BF03376632. ISSN 0440-9213. JSTOR 25617131. S2CID 140961583.
- Swadesh, Morris; Arana Swadesh, Evangelina; Bendor-Samuel, John T.; Wilson, W. A. A. (1966). "A preliminary glottochronology of Gur languages". Journal of West African Languages. 3 (2): 27–65.
- Westermann, Diedrich; Bryan, M. A.; Arnott, D. W. (1970) [1952]. The Languages of West Africa (new ed.). Folkstone: Dawsons. ISBN 0-7129-0462-X. OCLC 150447.
