= Glottal stop (letter) =

Letter of the Latin alphabet

- ʔ Ɂ ɂ ˀ
- 7

Usage
- Writing system: Latin script
- Type: alphabetic
- Sound values: /ʔ/
- In Unicode: U+0294, U+0241, U+0242, U+02C0

History
- Development: ◌̓: ʔ Ɂ ɂ ˀ
- Descendants: ʡ; ʕ; ʢ; ʖ; ƾ; 𝼎
- Variations: 7

Other
- Associated graphs: ʼ ʾ ʻ Ꞌ
- Writing direction: left-to-right

ʔ (majuscule: Ɂ, minuscule: ɂ), called a gelded question mark or simply a glottal stop, is an alphabetic letter in some Latin alphabets, most notably in several languages of Canada where it indicates a glottal stop sound. Such usage derives from phonetic transcriptions, for example the International Phonetic Alphabet (IPA), that use this letter for the glottal stop sound. The letter derives historically from an apostrophe ⟨ʼ⟩, as does the half ring ⟨ʾ⟩.

== Graphic variants ==
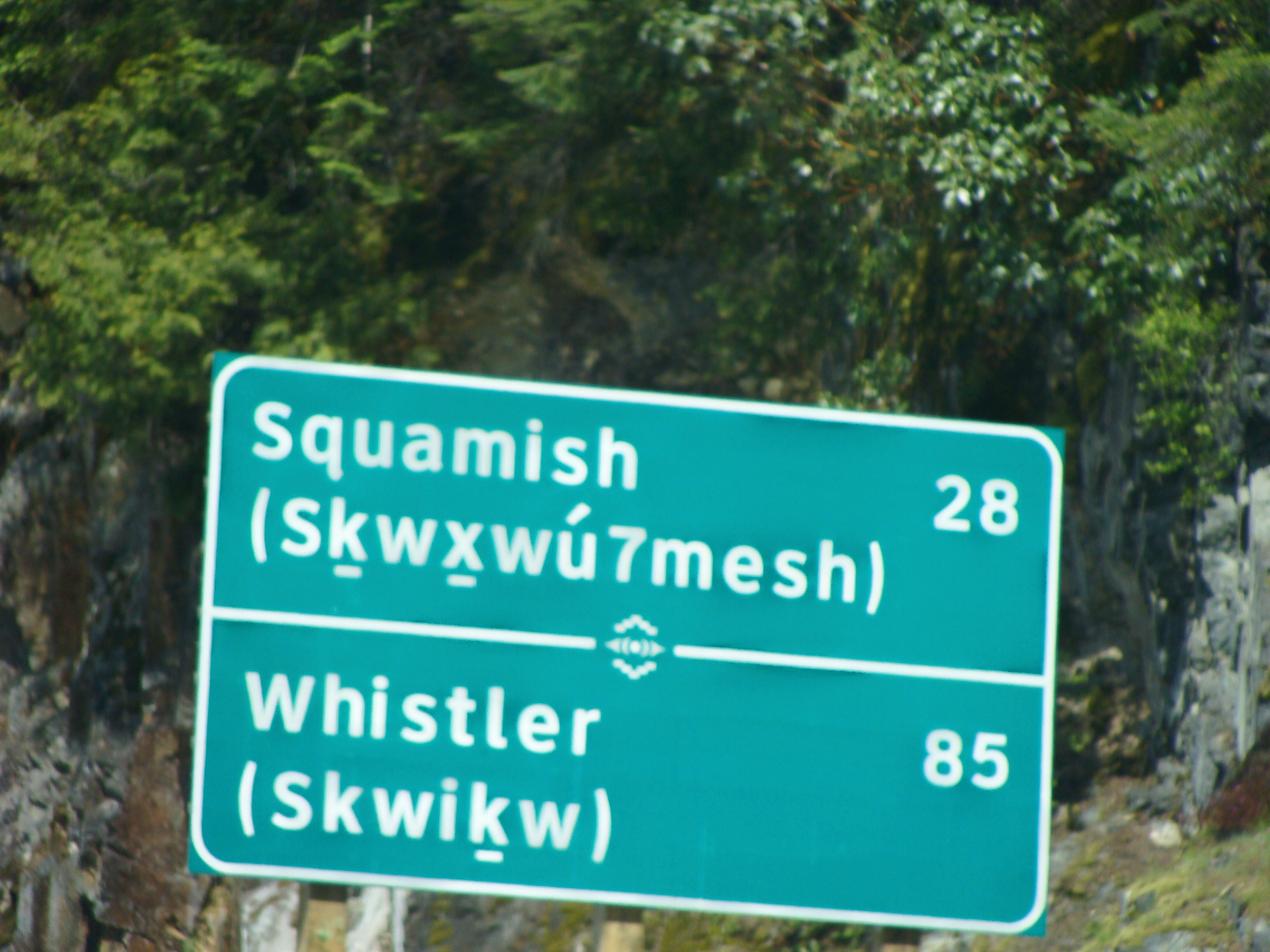
Road sign in British Columbia showing the use of the digit ⟨7⟩ to represent /ʔ/ in the Squamish language.

Where ⟨ʔ⟩ is not available, not being in the basic Latin alphabet, it is sometimes replaced by a question mark ⟨?⟩, which is its official representation in the SAMPA transcription scheme. In Skwomesh or Squamish, ⟨ʔ⟩ may be replaced by the digit ⟨7⟩ (see image above).

In Unicode, four graphic variants of the glottal stop letter are available.

- Unicase ⟨ʔ⟩ (U+0294 ʔ LATIN LETTER GLOTTAL STOP) is provided for the International Phonetic Alphabet and Americanist phonetic notation. It is found in a number of orthographies that use the IPA/APA symbol, such as those of several Salishan languages.
- A case pair, uppercase ⟨Ɂ⟩ (U+0241 Ɂ LATIN CAPITAL LETTER GLOTTAL STOP) and lowercase ⟨ɂ⟩ (U+0242 ɂ LATIN SMALL LETTER GLOTTAL STOP), is provided for the orthographies of Athabaskan languages in the Northwest Territories. Uppercase ⟨Ɂ⟩ may be slightly wider than unicase ⟨ʔ⟩ in fonts that distinguish them.
- Superscript ⟨ˀ⟩ (U+02C0 ˀ MODIFIER LETTER GLOTTAL STOP) that is used in Cayuga, the IPA and the Uralic Phonetic Alphabet.

Additionally, there are two graphic variants with a stroke, both used in phonetic transcriptions.

- Caseless U+02A1 ʡ LATIN LETTER GLOTTAL STOP WITH STROKE
- Superscript U+107B3 𐞳 MODIFIER LETTER GLOTTAL STOP WITH STROKE

=== Other notations ===
Other common symbols for the glottal stop sound are variants of the punctuation mark apostrophe that was the historical basis of the glottal stop letters. These include the 9-shaped modifier letter apostrophe, ⟨ʼ⟩, which is probably the most common (and the direct ancestor of ⟨ʔ⟩), the 6-shaped ʻokina of Hawaiian, ⟨ʻ⟩, and the straight-apostrophe shaped saltillo of many languages of Mexico, which has the case forms ⟨Ꞌ ꞌ⟩.

== Usage ==
=== Technical transcription ===
- Americanist phonetic notation, International Phonetic Alphabet, Uralic Phonetic Alphabet—unicase ʔ or superscript ˀ
- Transcription of Australian Aboriginal languages—occasionally unicase ʔ

=== Vernacular orthographies ===
- Languages of Canada
  - Na-Dene
    - Chipewyan—uppercase Ɂ and lowercase ɂ
    - Dogrib—uppercase Ɂ and lowercase ɂ
    - Slavey—uppercase Ɂ and lowercase ɂ
  - Salishan
    - Halkomelem—unicase ʔ
    - Lillooet—unicase 7
    - Lushootseed—unicase ʔ
    - Nuxalk—unicase 7
    - Samish—unicase 7
    - Squamish—unicase 7
    - Thompson—unicase ʔ
  - Wakashan
    - Ditidaht—unicase ʔ
    - Nuu-chah-nulth—unicase ʔ
  - Iroquoian
    - Tuscarora—uppercase Ɂ and lowercase ɂ
  - Isolate
    - Kutenai—unicase ʔ
- Languages of Africa
  - Cameroon
    - Mendankwe-Nkwen—uppercase Ɂ and lowercase ɂ
  - Ivory Coast
    - Abidji—unicase ʔ
    - Cebaara—unicase ʔ
    - Nyarafolo—unicase ʔ
    - Tagwana—unicase ʔ
  - Mali
    - Tamasheq—unicase ʔ
  - Senegal
    - Hassanya—unicase ʔ as uppercase and lowercase ʼ
    - Laalaa—uppercase Ɂ and lowercase ʼ

Languages of Canada		Upper	Lower
Na-Dene	Chipewyan	Ɂ	ɂ
Na-Dene	Dogrib	Ɂ	ɂ
Na-Dene	Slavey	Ɂ	ɂ
Salishan	Halkomelem	ʔ	
Salishan	Lillooet	7	
Salishan	Lushootseed	ʔ	
Salishan	Nuxalk	7	
Salishan	Samish	7	
Salishan	Squamish	7	
Salishan	Thompson	ʔ	
Wakashan	Ditidaht	ʔ	
Wakashan	Nuu-chah-nulth	ʔ	
Iroquoian	Tuscarora	Ɂ	ɂ
Isolate	Kutenai	ʔ	

== Computing codes ==
In Unicode 1.0, only the unicase and superscript variants were included. In version 4.1 (2005), an uppercase character was added, and the existing unicase character was redefined as its lowercase. Then, in version 5.0 (2006), it was decided to separate the cased and caseless usages by adding a dedicated lowercase letter. The IPA character is first from left, while the extended Latin alphabet characters are third and fourth from left.

Character information
Preview	ʔ		ˀ		Ɂ		ɂ	
Unicode name	LATIN LETTER; GLOTTAL STOP		MODIFIER LETTER; GLOTTAL STOP		LATIN CAPITAL LETTER; GLOTTAL STOP		LATIN SMALL LETTER; GLOTTAL STOP	
Encodings	decimal	hex	dec	hex	dec	hex	dec	hex
Unicode	660	U+0294	704	U+02C0	577	U+0241	578	U+0242
UTF-8	202 148	CA 94	203 128	CB 80	201 129	C9 81	201 130	C9 82
Numeric character reference	&#660;	&#x294;	&#704;	&#x2C0;	&#577;	&#x241;	&#578;	&#x242;

== See also ==
- Glottalization
- Glottal stop § Writing
- ʾ (Modifier letter right half ring)
- ʕ (Reversed letter)
- ʡ and ʢ (Stroked letters)
- ʖ, ƾ, and 𝼎 (Inverted letters)
- ˀ and ˤ (Superscript letters)
- ʻOkina
- Aleph
- Apostrophe
- Hamza
- Palochka
- Reversed glottal stop
- Saltillo (letter)
- Sokuon
- Spiritus lenis
