= Senufo people =

West African ethnic group

Senufo
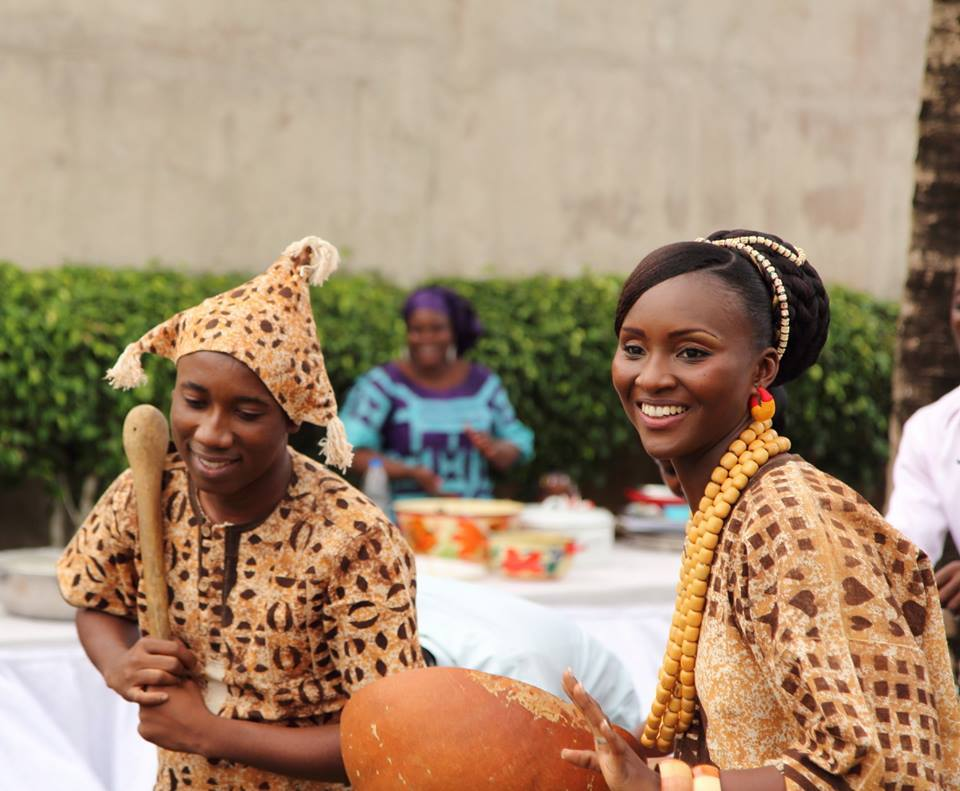
- Senufo people

Total population
- c. 3 million (2013); 0.8 million in Mali

Regions with significant populations
- Northeastern Côte d'Ivoire, southeastern Mali and southwestern Burkina Faso, and one subgroup in western Ghana

Languages
- Senufo languages, French

Religion
- Predominantly animist; some Muslim

The Senufo people, also known as Siena, Senefo, Sene, Senoufo, and Syénambélé, are a West African ethnolinguistic group. They consist of diverse subgroups living in a region spanning northern Ivory Coast, southeastern Mali, and western Burkina Faso. One sub-group, the Nafana, is found in north-western Ghana.

The Senufo people are predominantly animists, with some who are Muslims. They are regionally famous for their handicrafts, many of which feature their cultural themes and religious beliefs.

== Demographics and languages ==
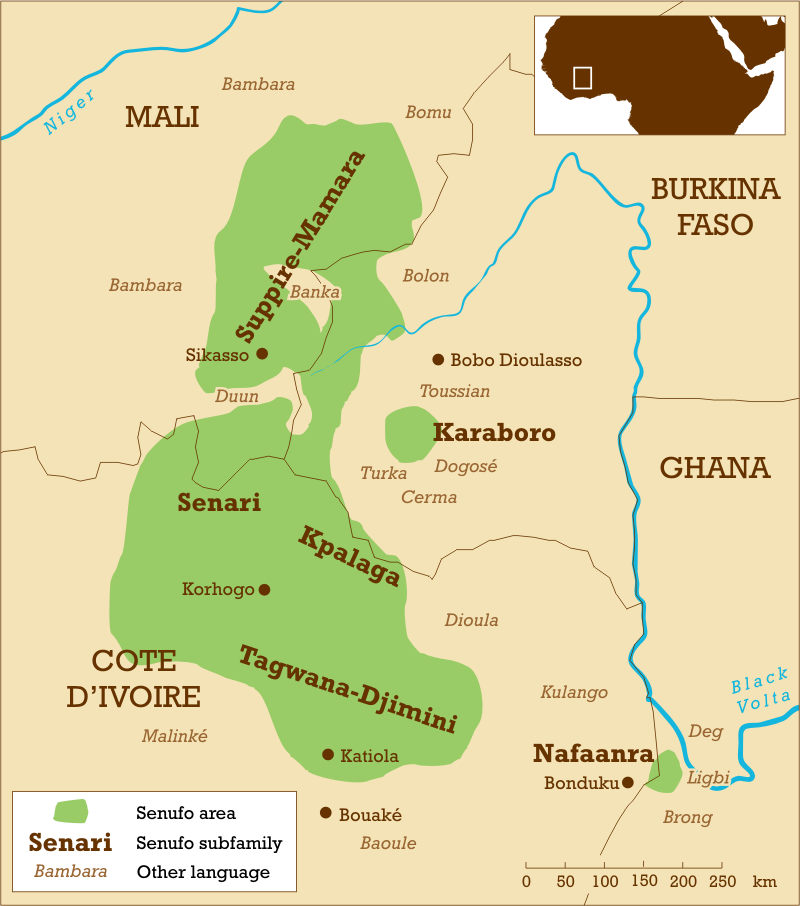
Approximate distribution of Senufo people in Ivory Coast, Mali, Burkina Faso and Ghana

In the 1980s, estimates placed the total Senufo population between 1.5 and 2.7 million. A 2013 estimate places the total over 3 million, with the majority of them living in Ivory Coast in places such as Katiola, and some 0.8 million in southeastern Mali. Their highest population densities are found in the land between the Black Volta river, Bagoe River and Bani River.

Many Senufo groups have matrilineal descent systems. Typically, the Senufo people are studied in three large subgroups that have been relatively isolated. Some northern Senufo groups are associated with the Kénédougou region, found near Odienne, and who helped found an important kingdom of West Africa and resisted Islamic expansion and conversion efforts. The southern Senufo are the largest group, numbering over 2 million, who allowed Muslim traders to settle within their communities in the 18th century who actively proselytized, and about 20% of the southern Senufo are Muslims. The third group is very small and isolated from both northern and southern Senufo. Some sociologists, such as the French scholar Holas, mention fifteen identifiable sub-groups of the Senufo people, with thirty dialects and four castes distributed among them.

The term Senufo refers to a linguistic group comprising roughly thirty related dialects within the larger Gur language family. It belongs to the Gur-branch of the Niger-Congo language family, and consists of four distinct languages namely Palaka(also spelt Kpalaga), Djimini(also spelt Dyimini), and Senari in Côte d'Ivoire and Suppire( also spelt Supyire) in Mali, as well as Karaboro in Burkina Faso. Within each group, numerous subdivisions use their own names for the people and language; the name Senufo is of external origin. Palaka separated from the main Senufo stock well before the 14th century ad; at about that time, with the founding of the town of Kong as a Bambara trade-route station, the rest of the population began migrations to the south, west, and north, resulting in the present divisions.The Senufo speaking people range from 800,000 to one million and live in agricultural based communities predominately located in the Ivory Coast, West Africa, Africa.

Korhogo, an ancient town in northern Ivory Coast dating from the 13th century, is linked to the Senufo people. This separation of languages and sub-ethnic groups may be linked to the 14th-century migrations with its founding along with the Bambara trade-route.

== History ==
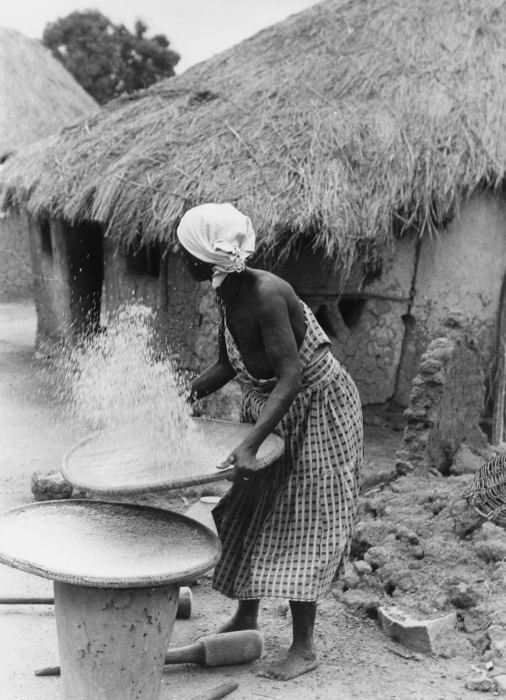
Senufo people traditionally have lived in circular shaped mud huts, agriculture historically is their main livelihood

The Senufo people emerged as a group sometime within the 15th or 16th century. They were a significant part of the 17th to 19th-century Kénédougou Kingdom (literally "country of the plain") with the capital of Sikasso. This region saw many wars including the rule of Daoula Ba Traoré, a cruel despot who reigned between 1840 and 1877. The Islamisation of the Senufo people began during this historical period of the Kénédougou Kingdom, but it was the kings & chiefs who converted, while the general Senufo population refused. Daoula Ba Traoré attempted to convert his kingdom to Islam, destroying many villages within the kingdom such as Guiembe and Nielle in 1875 because they resisted his views. The Kénédougou dynastic rulers attacked their neighbors as well, such as the Zarma people and they in turn counterattacked many times between 1883 and 1898.

The pre-colonial wars and violence led to their migration into Burkina Faso in regions that became towns such as Tiembara in Kiembara Department. The Kénédougou kingdom and the Traoré dynasty were dissolved in 1898 with the arrival of French colonial rule.

=== Slavery ===
The Senufo people were both victims of and perpetrators of slavery as they victimized other ethnic groups by enslavement. They themselves bought and sold slaves to Muslim merchants, Asante people and Baoulé people. As refugees from other West African ethnic groups escaped wars, states Paul Lovejoy, some of them moved into the Senufo lands, seized their lands and enslaved them.

The largest demand for slaves initially came from the markets of Sudan, and for a long time, slave trading was one an important economic activity across the Sahel and West Africa, states Martin Klein. Sikasso and Bobo-Dioulasso were important sources of slaves captured who were then moved to Timbuktu and Banamba on their way to the Sudanese and Mauritanian slave markets.

Those enslaved in Senufo lands worked the land, herds and served within the home. Their owner and his dependents also had the right to have sexual intercourse with female domestic slaves. The children of a female slave inherited her slave status.

== Society and culture ==
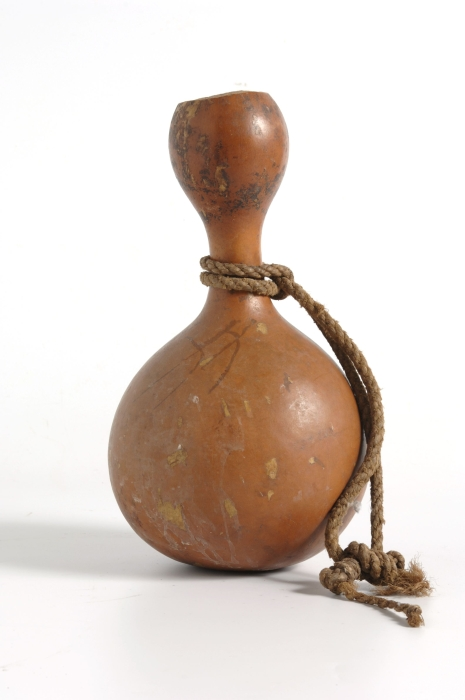
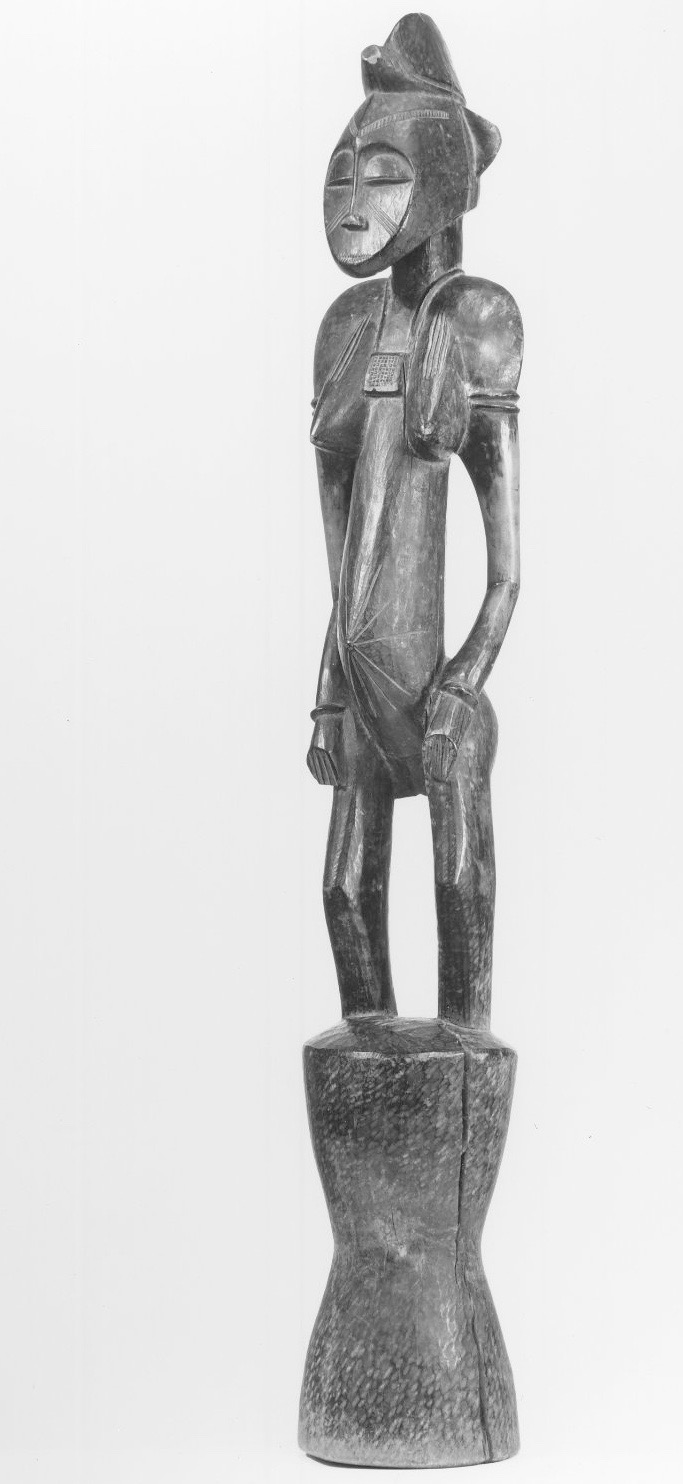
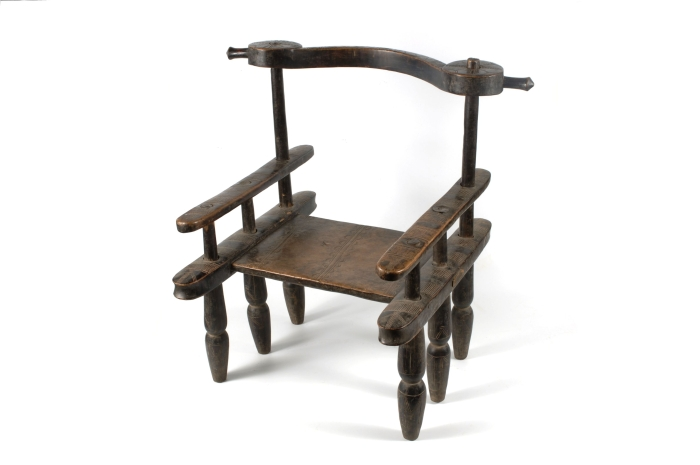
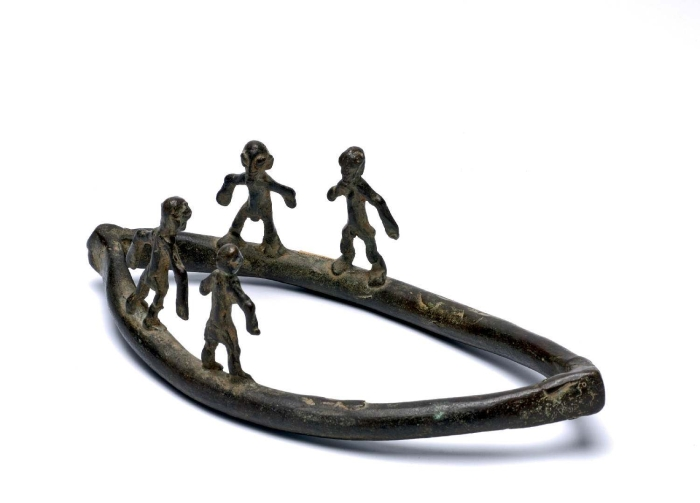
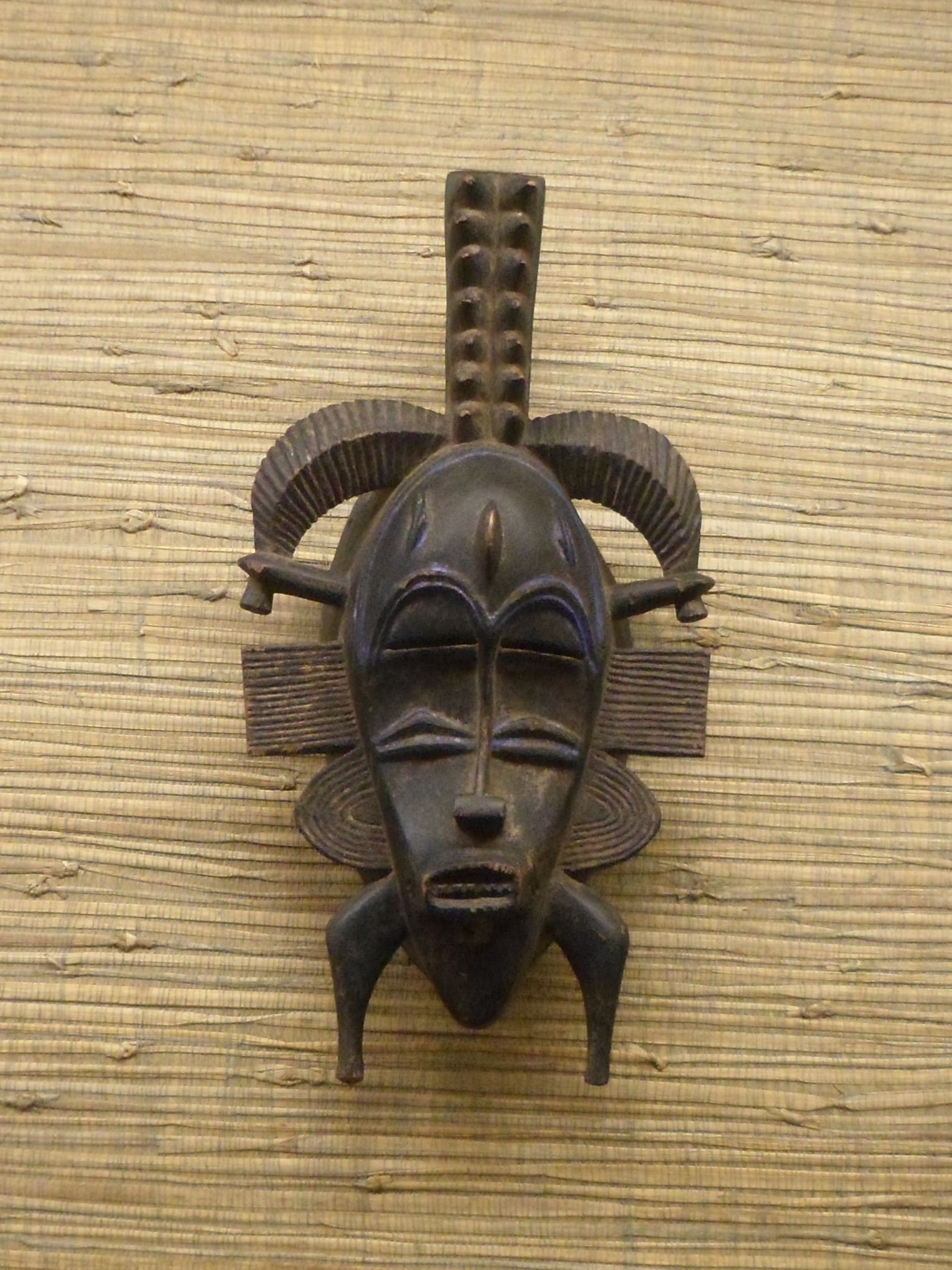
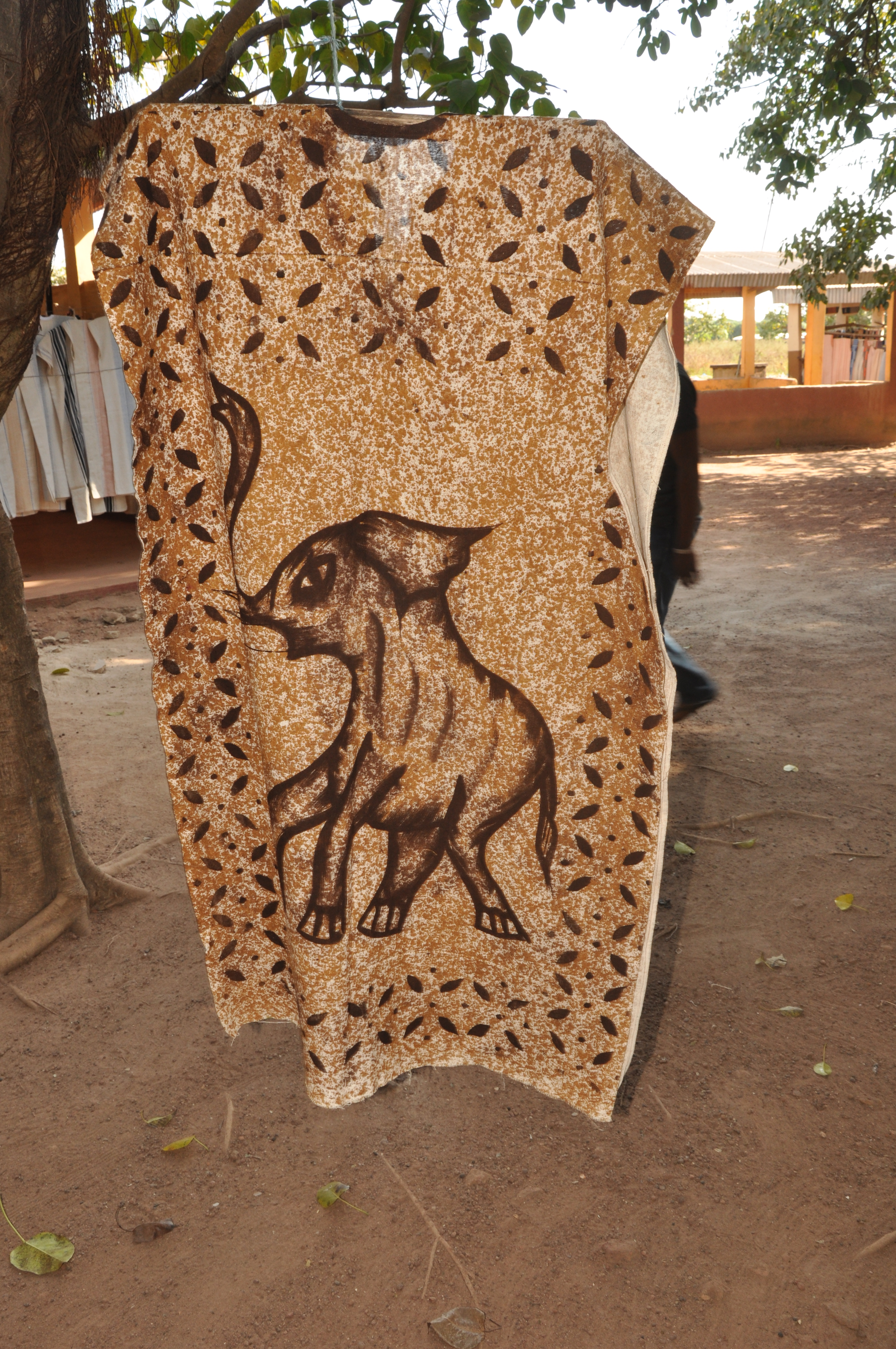
The handicrafts of Senufo people

The Senufo are predominantly an agricultural people cultivating corn, millet, yams, and peanut. Senufo villages consist of small mud-brick homes. In the rainy southern communities of Senufo, thatched roofs are common, while flat roofs are prevalent in dry desert-like north. The Senufo is a patriarchal extended family society, where arranged typically cousin marriage and polygyny has been fairly common, however, succession and property inheritance has been matrilineal.

As agriculturalists, they cultivate a wide variety of crops, including cotton and cash crops for the international market. As musicians, they are world renowned, playing a multitude of instruments from: wind instruments (Aerophones), stringed instruments (Chordaphones) and percussive instruments (Membranophones). Senufo communities use a caste system, each division known as a Katioula. In this system the farmers, known as Fo no, and the artisans at the opposite ends of the spectrum. The term artisan encompasses different individual castes within Senufo society including blacksmiths (Kule), carvers (Kpeene), brasscutters (Tyeli), potterers, and leather workers, whose lives revolve around the roles, responsibilities, and structures inhabited by the individual class. Training to become an artisan takes about seven or eight years; commencing with an apprenticeship where the trainees create objects not associated with the religion of the Senufo, then culminating with an initiation process where they obtain the ability to create ritual object.

Regionally, the Senufo are famous as musicians and superb carvers of wood sculpture, masks, and figurines. The Senufo people have specialized their art and handicraft work by subgroups, wherein the art is learnt within this group, passed from one generation to the next. The Kulubele specialize as woodcarvers, the Fonombele specialize in blacksmith and basketry work, the Kpeembele specialize in brass casting, the Djelebele are renowned for leatherwork, the Tchedumbele are masters of gunsmith work, while Numu specialize in smithing and weaving. Outside the artisan subgroups, the Senufo people have hunters, musicians, grave-diggers, diviners, and healers who are called the Fejembele. Among these various subgroups, the leatherworkers or Djelebele are the ones who have most adopted Islam, although those who convert retain many of their animist practices.

Traditionally, the Senufo people have been a socially stratified society, similar to many West African ethnic groups having castes. These endogamous divisions are locally called Katioula, and one of the strata in this division includes slaves and descendants of slaves. According to Dolores Richter, the caste systems in Africa found among Senufo people features "hierarchical ranking including despised lower castes, occupational specificity, ritual complementarity, endogamy, hereditary membership, residential isolation, and the political superiority of farmers over artisan castes".

The Senufo people usually fall within four societies in their culture: Poro, Sandogo, Wambele, or Tyekpa. While all the societies fill particular roles in the governance and education of the Senufo people, the Poro and Sandogo societies are the only two that fill the spiritual and divinatory roles. Spirituality and divination are divided between these two gender-imperative societies with women falling under the Sando or Sandogo society, and men falling under the Poro society with the exception of men who are members of those of the women because of their mother. These societies are the two that create the majority of commissioned Senufo art.

Typically, the Senufo villages are independent of each other, and each has a male secret society called Poro with elaborate initiation rituals in a patch of forest they consider as sacred. The initiation rituals involve masks, figurines, and ritual equipment that the Senufo people carve and have perfected. The secrecy has helped the Senufo people to preserve their culture in the times of wars and political pressure. Senufo wear specially-crafted brass jewelry, such as those mimicking wildlife.

"The main function of Poro is to guarantee a good relationship between the living world and the ancestors. Nerejao is an ancestress who is recognized as the true head of the Poro society. Divination, which is governed by the Sandogo society, is also an important part of Senufo religion. Although Sandogo is usually considered a women's society, men who are called to the profession and inherit through the matrilineal line are permitted to become diviners."

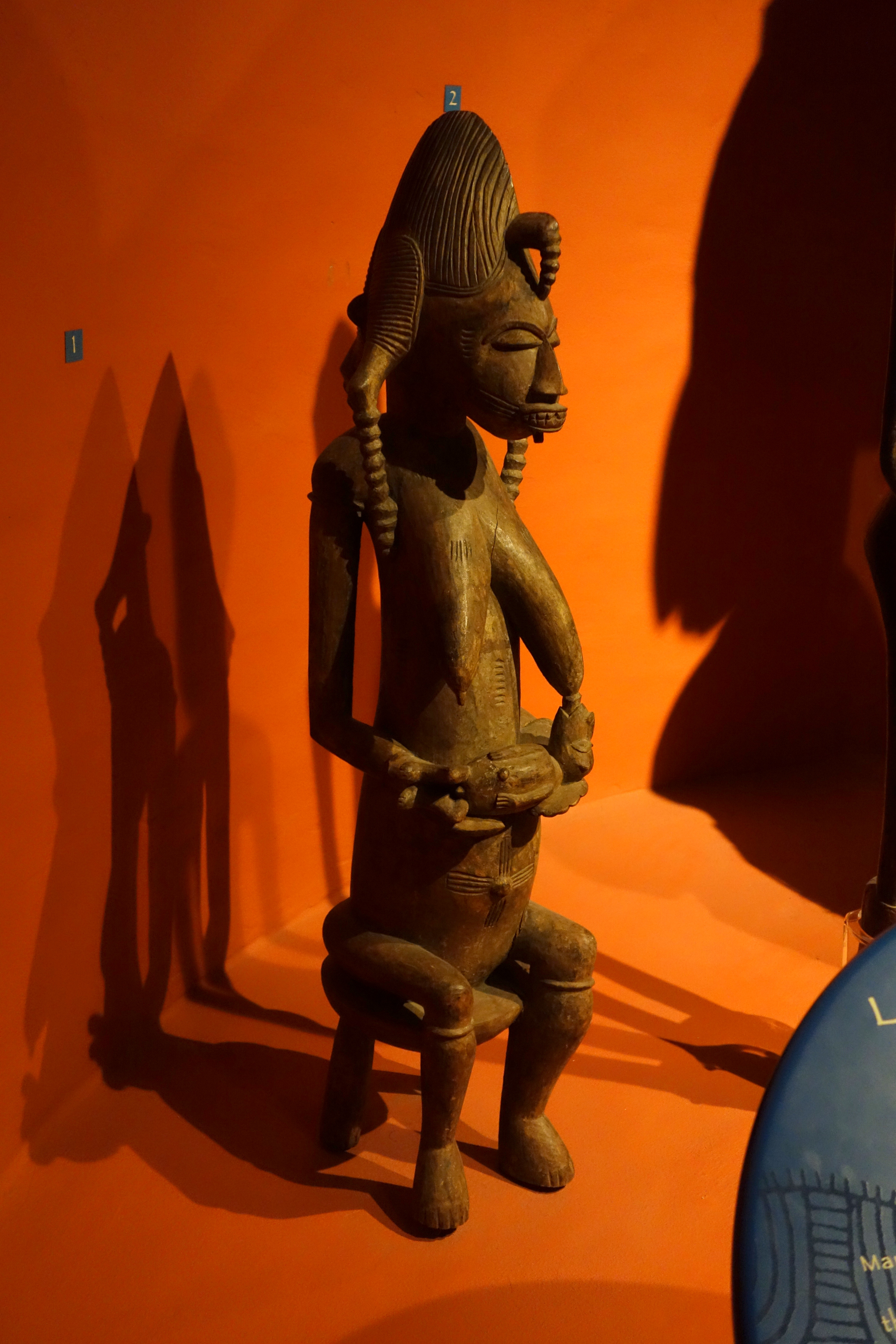
Caryatid Figure used during tyekpa society funeral ceremonies along with Ceremonial Drums

The Sandogo are women diviners among the Senufo people. They have their own rituals and secret order. In addition, the Senufo people have Wambele and Typka, who perform sorcery and rituals.

Within Senufo culture, the female form is held above all others in terms of beauty and aesthetics and caryatid figures are seen with various cultural connotations. This is tied into the worship of the spirit, "Ancient Mother", or the spirit, "mother", Maleeo, who is revered as the guiding entity by all Poro society initiates and members. The goddess Maleeo has a partner, the god Kolocolo, who is seen as the identifying deity of the Sandogo, who granted the people marriage and this particular type of lineage to allow communication from humanity and the spirit world. Caryatid figures are seen as representations of the role of women as spiritual mediators and the Sandogo use them in ceremonies as symbols of this bilateral celestial discourse. Likewise, in the case of the Poro, there are writings about caryatid figures being used in ceremonies where they are brought out to commemorate advancement in the age-grade cycle, as well as being used to raise funds by initiates of the society. Calved figures were used in a tyekpa funeral ceremony as dance sculpture, held upon the head of the dancers while the ceremony takes place.

The traditional Senufo religion is a type of animism. This Senufo belief includes ancestral and nature spirits, who may be contacted. They believe in a Supreme Being, who is viewed in a dual female-male: an Ancient Mother, Maleeo or Katieleo, and a male Creator God, Kolotyolo or Koulotiolo.

=== Influence ===
The art of Senufo people inspired twentieth-century European artists such as Pablo Picasso and Fernand Léger. The cubism and masks found in Senufo pieces were a significant influence for Pablo Picasso's African period.

The term Senufo has become a category to art collectors and scholars, a symbolism for the artistic traditions of West Africa, starting with the early twentieth century. Old pieces of Senufo art are found in many leading museums of the world.

Cornélius Yao Azaglo August, a photographer, created a photographical journal of Senufo people from 1955 onward.

== See also ==
- Ceremonial Drum of the Senufo People
- French colonial empire
- Islam in Africa
- Korhogo Cloth
- Kponyungo
- Traditional African religion
- Senufo bird
