= Manianka language =

Manianka may refer to:

- Manya language
- Senoufo language
