= Nafana people =

Ethnic group in West Africa

The Nafana are an isolated Senufo people living east of Bondoukou.

The Nafana are a Senufo people living in the central north-west of Ghana and the north-east of Côte d'Ivoire, in the area east of Bondoukou. They number about 45, 000 (SIL/GILLBT 1992) and speak Nafaanra, a Senufo language. They are surrounded by Gur speakers to the north, the isolated Mande-speaking Ligbi people to the east, and the Akan-speaking Abron to the south. The Nafana people relate that they come from Côte d'Ivoire, a village called Kakala. According to Jordan (1978), their oral history says that some of their people are still there, and they would not be allowed to leave again. They arrived in the Banda area after the Ligbi people, who according to Stahl (2004) came from Bigu (Begho, Bighu) to the area in the early 17th century. Some major towns of the Nafana people are Sampa, Kokoa, Duadaso No 1, Duadaso No 2, Jamera/Jaamala, Debibi, and Kabile in the Jaman North District. Brodi and Debibi are in the Tain District. Banda Ahenkro in the Banda District. The people are mainly farmers. Their major festival is the Songhei Festival mainly originally in Jamala or Jamera celebrated annually. The Nafana people are the real who can trace their origins to the Songhai empire. Their main cultural heritage town is Jamera where all their history and traditions are based.It is believed that one of their first king called Tolee Sahfufuo who fought for the liberation of Nafana people in the area against the Gyaman kings.

== Bibliography ==
- Pitt, Walter (1926) 'The Mfantera or Frantomafo meaning those who wear clothes', Gold Coast Review 2/1: 71–77.
- Stahl, Ann (2004). "Making history in Banda: Reflections on the construction of Africa's past", in Historical Archaeology, 38, 1, 50–56.
