= Kar language =

Central Senufo language of Burkina Faso

Kar
- Eastern Karaboro
- Native to: Burkina Faso
- Native speakers: (40,000 cited 1995)
- Language family: Niger–Congo?: Atlantic–Congo; Senufo; Karaboro; Kar

Language codes
- ISO 639-3: xrb
- Glottolog: east2398

Kar (Kler), or Eastern Karaboro, is a central Senufo language of Burkina Faso. Kar speakers have moderate comprehension of Western Karaboro, but the reverse is not the case.
