= Palaka language =

Senufo language spoken in Mali

Palaka
- Kpalaka
- Native to: Ivory Coast
- Region: Savanes District
- Native speakers: (8,000 cited 1995)
- Language family: Niger–Congo?: Atlantic–Congo; Senufo; Central; Palaka

Language codes
- ISO 639-3: plr
- Glottolog: pala1342
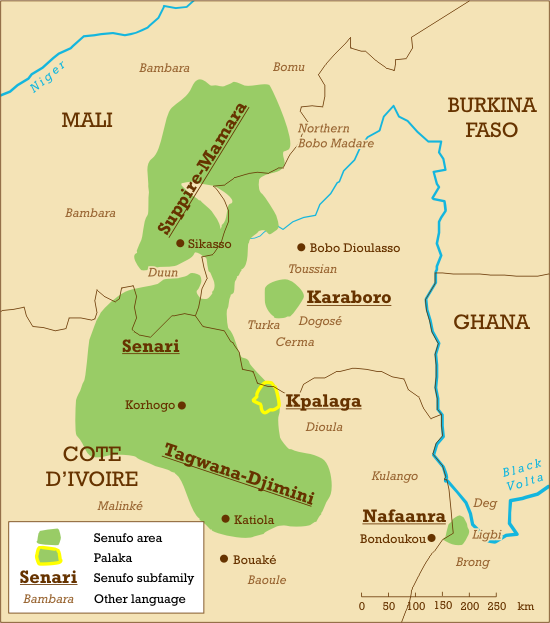
- Palaka area, some neighbouring languages, and the other Senufo languages.

Palaka (or 'Kpalaga') is a central Senufo language spoken by approximately 8,000 people in northern Ivory Coast. It is bordered to the south by Djimini, a southern Senufo language, and to the west by Nyarafolo, another Senufo language. North and east of the Palaka area live Dioula people.

Palaka constitutes a separate branch of the Senufo languages on its own, being rather different from them in morphology and phonology. It has been tentatively linked to Nafaanra language, an isolated Senufo language spoken in Ghana. Palaka has been separated from the other Senufo languages at least since the fourteenth century AD.
