= ˀ (disambiguation) =

The glottal stop (letter) character ˀ is a superscript letter represented by U+02C0 ˀ MODIFIER LETTER GLOTTAL STOP in Unicode.

It may be used for:

- Glottalization, a phonetic process involving closure of the glottis
  - Glottalic consonant, a consonant produced with glottal features
  - Stød, a prosodic feature in Danish phonology
