= XRB =

XRB may refer to:

- X-ray burster or X-ray bursts, in astronomy
- Pacific National XRB class
- Nano (cryptocurrency), former code XRB
- Karaboro languages, ISO 639 code xrb
