= Mamara =

Mamara may refer to:

- Mamara, a language also known as Minyanka
- mamara, the Hindi name for a type of puffed rice
- Mamara, Peru, a town in Apurímac region in Peru.
