= Sdq =

Sdq or SDQ may refer to:

- Las Américas International Airport, Punta Caucedo, Dominican Republic, IATA airport code SDQ
- Strengths and Difficulties Questionnaire, a screening questionnaire for emotional and behavioral problems in children and adolescents
- Semandang language, ISO 939-3 language code sdq
