= Kponyungo =

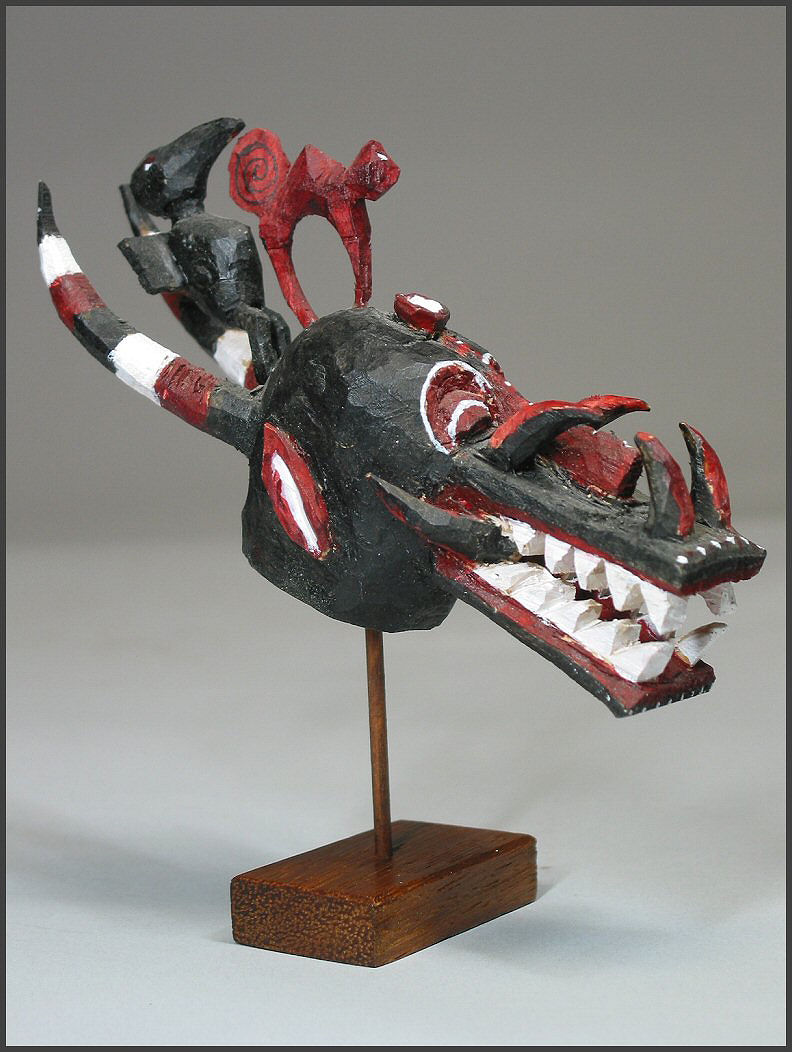
A kponyungo mask

The kponyungo is a ritual mask created by the Senufo people, an ethnolinguistic group residing in Africa's Ivory Coast.

== Uses ==
Kponyungo masks are spiritual items used in funeral ceremonies. In this ritual, One member from each participating Poro Organization (a secret men's society, also referred to as a hunting society) wears a mask and will drum next to the home of the deceased or the home belonging to the deceased lineage group. The purpose of this ceremony is to capture the spirit of the deceased. If the spirit is allowed to roam free, it might bring the original chaos back to the Senufo people. The author of this does not claim to understand the nature of 'chaos' as it is understood by the Senufo. Regardless, this ceremony is based on the preservation of the Senufo people and culture, as they believe that the death of one member has the potential to bring about the destruction of their society.

The physical design of the mask is important to its ceremonial roles. Each mask is made differently, has different meaning to the person who crafts it, and serves different purposes within the funeral ritual depending on its physical attributes. The masks generally resemble the head of an antelope at its base. Antelope horns and warthog tusks are the most important and most common attribute of the masks. Occasionally, porcupine quills and ‘magic’ feathers may be inserted into the mouth and muzzle. The masks may also hold inscribed images of birds such as the African Fish Eagle, the shrike, or the hornbill, eating a chameleon attached to a cup. The cup is said to symbolize a container for magical herbs. Many of these image have unknown symbolic meaning.

== Art Institute of Chicago ==
One of these masks is owned by the Art Institute of Chicago and is part of the "African Art and Indian Art of the Americas" gallery. It is not displayed with this gallery, however, as it is also a mobile item, allowing the museum to distribute it temporarily to other institutions. Through 2015 and early 2016, the object traveled to the Cleveland Museum of Art, the Saint Louis Art Museum, and the Musée Fabre in Montpellier, France, Kimbell Art Museum, and as of 2026 is off display. The object has an unrecorded history prior to its departure from its original location, Ivory Coast. The individuals who acquired the mask in 1963, Henri and Hélène Kamer, have never shared their experience in acquiring this particular mask. It is common, however, that these masks are sold to art dealers if the object is no longer in use (or no longer considered powerful and spiritual) by the Senufo people. This is most likely how the transaction occurred, and soon thereafter the Kamers brought the mask to America and sold it to the Chicago's Art Institute in 1963.
