= Senari languages =

Senari
- Geographic distribution: northern Ivory Coast, southern Mali, southern Burkina Faso
- Linguistic classification: Niger–Congo?: Atlantic–Congo; Senufo; Central; Senari

Language codes
- Glottolog: cent2244
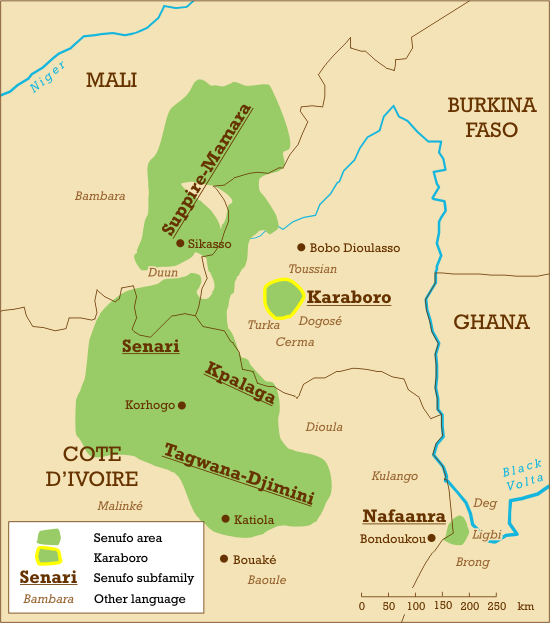
- The Senufo language area

The Senari languages form a central dialect cluster of the Senufo languages. They are spoken in northern Ivory Coast, southern Mali and southwest Burkina Faso by more than a million Senufo.

Three varieties can be distinguished, all with several dialects:

- Cebaara (Tyebaala)
- Senara
- Nyarafolo

With 860,000 speakers, Cebaara (Tyembara) is the largest of the four; it is also the central variety, spoken around the traditional Senufo center Korhogo. Senara (190,000 native speakers) of the Laraba Province of Burkina Faso is a geographic outlier; intelligibility testing with Cebaara yields ratings between 42 and 74 per cent (SIL). Nyarafolo is spoken by 50,000 in northeast Ivory Coast around Ferkessédougou; Ethnologue reports a classification as Tagwana-Djimini rather than Senari. Within Senufo as a whole, the Senari languages are thought to be most closely related to the Karaboro languages.
