= Suppire–Mamara languages =

Suppire–Mamara
- Geographic distribution: southern Mali, southern Burkina Faso
- Linguistic classification: Niger–Congo?: Atlantic–Congo; Senufo; Suppire–Mamara

Language codes
- Glottolog: nort3254

The Suppire–Mamara languages form the northern branch of the Senufo language family and are mainly spoken in Mali. They comprise five different languages, totalling approximately 750,000 speakers (Olson 1996). The Northern Senufo languages are separated from the Central Senufo languages by a small band of Mande speaking people (the Duun). To the east and west, they are also bordered mainly by Mande languages like Bambara and Dioula, and they have been influenced considerably by those languages in both vocabulary and grammar (Carlson 1994).

The Suppire–Mamara languages are:

- Mamara (Minyanka, Mianka)
- Nanerige (Nanergé)
- Supyire (Suppire)
- Sucite (Sicite, Sìcìté)

== See also ==
- Senufo languages
- Map of the Senufo language area
