= Beginci language =

Language spoken in Kalimantan, Indonesia

Beginci
- Native to: Indonesia
- Region: Kalimantan
- Native speakers: 7,500 (2019)
- Language family: Austronesian: Malayo-Polynesian; Land Dayak; Southern Land Dayak; Beginci

Language codes
- ISO 639-3: ebc
- Glottolog: begi1237

Beginci is a Malayo-Polynesian language spoken in Indonesia. It was added to ISO 639-3 in 2020, after splitting it and Gerai from Semandang.
