= Djimini people =

The Djimini (also spelt Dyimini) people of Ivory Coast belong to the larger Senoufo group. They have a population of about 100,000 and live in the north-eastern area of Ivory Coast, in Burkina Faso and Mali.

The Djimini pass on their stories and traditions to their children. Men are considered to have reached adulthood by the age of thirty and are then taught about what being a man means and about their role in the community.

== Language ==
Their language is in the Niger–Congo family. They think very highly of their language and speak it at home, working in the fields and at the market place, so it is not likely to disappear.

== Working life ==
The Djimini are farmers. The more successful they are, the more respect they receive from the rest of the tribe. Men and women of all ages help with the farm work, to contribute to their family's needs, as the Djimini grow all the food they need to survive. They grow peanuts, cassava, corn, rice, millet, beans, mangoes and cashews. They are paid poorly for them, even when the harvest is successful, so when there is drought, life is very difficult.

== Recreation ==
In their spare time, the Djimini enjoy playing soccer. They have their own festivals and traditional dances, during which they wear masks which often have a trunk-like nose.

They are known for their unique artwork, influenced by the neighboring Senufo people. Artwork includes masks made from wood carvings.

== Beliefs ==
Animism is the main religious practice of the Djimini. This is a traditional African religion, which means they believe everything has a spirit inside it, for example inside the earth, moon, sun, lakes, rivers and seas.

Almost 50% of the Djimini practise Folk Islam, a mixture of Christian practises and pagan practices, but only 1% are Christians.

They have situated their houses around a baobab tree for generations. They plant one at the site of every village and associate it with a good spirit that provides protection and good fortune for their people. Baobab trees can live to be thousands of years old.

Because the Djimini depend on the food they grow, they believe that the ground holds spiritual blessings and many villages have priests who make sacrifices to the earth.

Like many of their neighbouring tribes, the Djimini believe that when people die, their spirits have power over their descendants’ lives.
