= Tagwana language =

Senufo language of Ivory Coast

Tagwana
- Tagbana
- Native to: Ivory Coast
- Region: Central Department
- Native speakers: (140,000 cited 1993)
- Language family: Niger–Congo?: Atlantic–Congo; Senufo; Tagwana–Djimini; Tagwana

Language codes
- ISO 639-3: tgw
- Glottolog: tagw1240

Tagwana (Tagbana) is a southern Senufo language of Ivory Coast. It is closely related to Djimini.

== Phonology ==
=== Consonants ===
		Labial	Alveolar	Palatal	Velar	Labio- velar	Glottal
Nasal		m	n	ɲ	ŋ		
Plosive	voiceless	p	t	c	k	k͡p	ʔ
Plosive	voiced	b	d	ɟ	ɡ	ɡ͡b	
Fricative		f	s				h
Trill			r				
Lateral			l				
Approximant				j		w	

=== Vowels ===
Oral vowels
	Front	Central	Back
High	i		u
High-mid	e		o
Low-mid	ɛ		ɔ
Low		a	

Nasal vowels
	Front	Central	Back
High	ĩ		ũ
Low-mid	ɛ̃		ɔ̃
Low		ã	
