= Sucite language =

Senufo language spoken in West Africa

Sucite
- Native to: Burkina Faso, Mali
- Region: Sikasso Region
- Native speakers: (38,000 cited 1999–2007)
- Language family: Niger–Congo?: Atlantic–Congo; Senufo; Suppire–Mamara; Sucite

Language codes
- ISO 639-3: sep
- Glottolog: sici1249

The Sucite language or Sicite is a Senufo language spoken in southwestern Burkina Faso and Mali by approximately 35,000 people. Sucite is a close neighbour of the Supyire language, spoken in southeastern Mali. Sucite is sometimes regarded as the northern extension of the Supyire language. The two dialects are, according to Garber (1987), ‘quite mutually intelligible’. Sometimes speakers of Sucite will even refer to themselves as speaking Supyire. Another closely related lect is Mamara (also known as Minyanka).

Some other Senufo groups refers to the Sùcìté people as Tagba, because they live on the Tagouara plateau. There are various ways to spell the dialect names. Variants of Sucite include Sicite, Sipiite, and Sicire. The SIL language code is SEP.

== Sounds ==
=== Vowels ===
All vowels can be lengthened and nasalized. The schwa /ə/ is included in brackets because it is found only in two specific environments, where it appears to be in complementary distribution with some other vowel.

Phonetic inventory of vowels
	Front	Central	Back
Close	i ĩ		u ũ
Close-mid	e ẽ	(ə)	o õ
Open-mid	ɛ ɛ̃		ɔ ɔ̃
Open		a ã	

=== Consonants ===
		Labial	Alveolar	(Alveolo-) Palatal	Velar	Labio-velar	Glottal
Plosive/ Affricate	voiceless	p	t	t͡ɕ	k		ʔ
Plosive/ Affricate	voiced	b	d	d͡ʑ		ɡ͡b	
Plosive/ Affricate	geminate	bː	dː	d͡ʑː	ɡː		
Plosive/ Affricate	prenasalized	ⁿb	ⁿd	ⁿd͡ʑ	ⁿɡ	ⁿɡ͡b	
Nasal		m	n	nʲ	ŋ	ŋ͡m	
Fricative		f fʲ	s		x		
Glide		w wʲ		j			

Geminate voiced stops/affricates are cognate to prenasalized voiceless stops in Supyire, and are indicated orthographically as ⟨mp, nt, ...⟩ in Garber (1987).

=== Tone ===
Sucite is a tonal language with three surface tone levels: High, Mid, and Low. Garber (1987) and Carlson (1994) analyse the Northern Senufo system as having two different Mid tones, a strong mid (Ms) and a weak mid (Mw). The Ms tone undergoes substantially less tonal alternations than the Mw tone. Garber (1988) suggests that this peculiarity may have its origin in a tonal split.

Glides formed by combining pairs of tones exist, the most common being HL and ML.

== Grammar ==
=== Nouns ===
Like the other Senufo languages, Sucite employs a noun class system of five genders: three pairings of singular/plural classes and two mass/collective classes.

Nouns take class-specific suffixes for definiteness. For example:

Gloss	Indef.	Def.	Gender	Class
'river'	gba	gba-ŋé	wi	1
'rivers'	gba-ála	gba-á-bí	wi	2
'house'	gba-xa	gba-ké	ki	3
'houses'	gba-ya	gba-nyɛ́	ki	4
'forehead'	gba-là	gba-à-ne	li	5
'foreheads'	gbà-ʔala	gbà-ʔà-ki	li	6

=== Pronouns ===
Each noun class has its own set of pronouns. These may be general (clitic), emphatic, partitive, interrogative, demonstrative, or relative.

Pronouns
Class	1	2	3	4	5	6	7	8
Clitic	wu	bi	kə	yi	lə	ki	tə	bə
Emphatic	wurə̀	perə̀	kərə̀	yirə̀	lərə̀	kerə̀	tərə̀	pərə̀
Partitive	wà	pì	kà	yà	là	kì	tà	pà
Demonstrative	ngə́	mpí	nkə́	njí	ndə́	nkí	ntə́	mpə́
Interrogative	ngə	mpi	nkə	nji	ndə	nki	ntə	mpə

== Sources ==
- Carlson, Robert (1994) A Grammar of Suppyire. Berlin/New York: Mouton de Gruyter.
- Garber, Anne (1980) 'Word order change and the Senufo languages.' In Studies in the Linguistic Sciences, 10, 1, 45–57.
- Garber, Anne (1987) A Tonal Analysis of Senufo: Sucite dialect (Gur; Burkina Faso). PhD dissertation, Urbana: University of Illinois / Ann Arbor: UMI.
- Garber, Anne (1988) 'A double tiered analysis of Sicite tone'. In Journal of West African languages, 18, 2, 21–33.

== See also ==
- Senufo languages
- Map of the Senufo language area
