= Gerai language =

Language spoken in Kalimantan, Indonesia

Gerai
- Native to: Indonesia
- Region: Kalimantan
- Native speakers: 200 (2019)
- Language family: Austronesian: Malayo-Polynesian; Land Dayak; Southern Land Dayak; Gerai

Language codes
- ISO 639-3: gef
- Glottolog: gera1241

Gerai is a Greater North Borneo language spoken in Indonesia. It was added to ISO 639-3 in 2020, after splitting it and Beginci from Semandang.
