= Tagwana–Djimini languages =

Tagwana–Djimini
- Geographic distribution: northern Côte d'Ivoire
- Linguistic classification: Niger–Congo?: Atlantic–Congo; Senufo; Southern; Tagwana–Djimini
- Subdivisions: Tagwana; Djimini

Language codes
- Glottolog: None
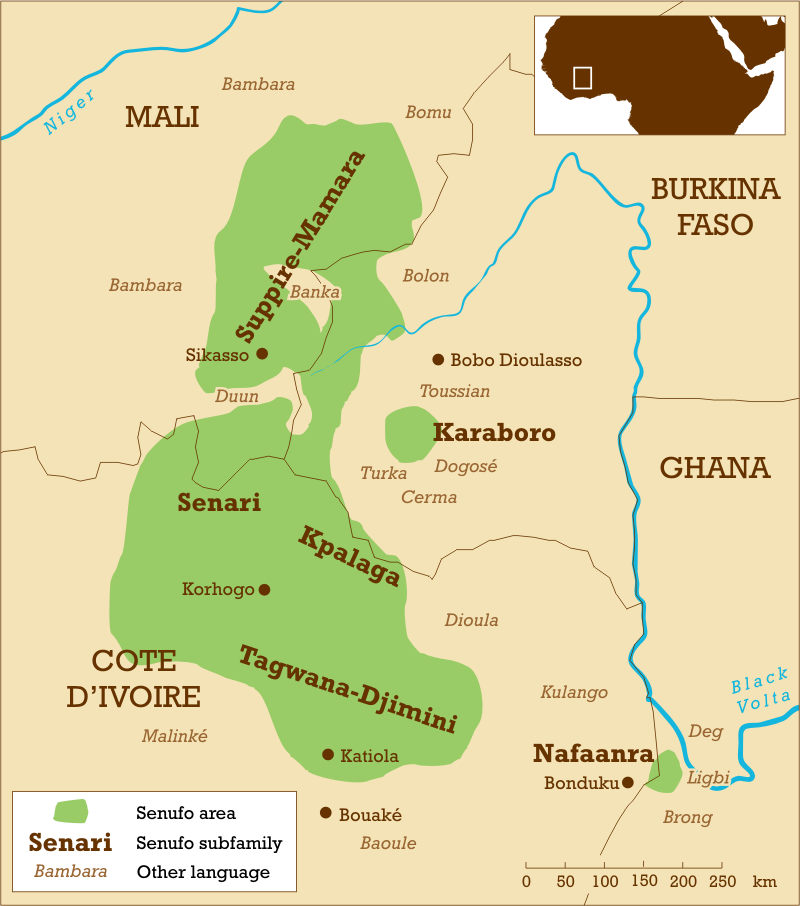
- Tagwana–Djimini (south) among the Senufo languages

Tagwana–Djimini are a branch of the Senufo languages of Côte d'Ivoire.
