= Gabriel Manessy =

French linguist (1923–1996)

- Born: 28 March 1923; France
- Died: 17 June 1996 (aged 73)
- Occupation: Linguist

Academic work
- Institutions: CNRS, University of Nice
- Main interests: Gur languages

Gabriel Manessy (28 March 1923 – 17 June 1996) was a French linguist who worked on Niger–Congo languages, especially the Gur languages.

Manessy is known for his historical-comparative work on the Gur languages. He wrote extensively on the Gurunsi, Oti–Volta, and Senufo languages.

== Career ==
Manessy was born on 28 March 1923. After studying literature, his interest shifted to ethnology.

After working briefly at the CNRS, he taught linguistics at the Faculty of Letters of Dakar and became the first Director of the Centre de linguistique appliquée de Dakar (CLAD). He was appointed Professor in 1964. He supervised Masters students in African Linguistics, first at Dakar, then at the Faculty of Letters and Human Sciences at Aix-en-Provence. From 1969 to 1988, he taught at the Faculty of Letters and Human Sciences at the University of Nice. He retired in 1988.

Manessy died on 17 June 1996 at the age of 73.
