= Syer-Tenyer language =

Senufo dialects of Burkina Faso

Syer-Tenyer
- Western Karaboro
- Native to: Burkina Faso
- Native speakers: (30,000 cited 1991)
- Language family: Niger–Congo?: Atlantic–Congo; Senufo; Karaboro; Syer-Tenyer
- Dialects: Syer; Tenyer

Language codes
- ISO 639-3: kza
- Glottolog: west2466

Syer-Tenyer, or Western Karaboro, is a pair of Senufo dialects of Burkina Faso.
