= Senara language =

Atlantic–Congo language spoken in Burkina Faso and Mali

Senara
- Senari
- Native to: Burkina Faso
- Native speakers: (210,000 cited 1995–2010)
- Language family: Niger–Congo?: Atlantic–Congo; Senufo; Senari; Senara

Language codes
- ISO 639-3: Either: seq – Senara shz – Syenara (duplicate code)
- Glottolog: sena1262 syen1235 bookkeeping; bibliography

Senara (Niangolo), one of a cluster of languages called Senari, is a Senufo language of Burkina Faso and Mali.

== Phonology ==
=== Consonants ===
Consonants
| | | Labial | Alveolar | Palatal | Velar | Labial-velar | Glottal |
|---|---|---|---|---|---|---|---|
| Plosive/Affricate | voiceless | p | t | tʃ | k | kp | ʔ |
| Plosive/Affricate | voiced | b | d | dʒ | g | gb | |
| Nasal | | m | | | | | |
| Fricative | voiceless | f | s | | | | |
| Fricative | voiced | v | z | | | | |
| Approximant | | | l | j | | w | |

=== Vowels ===
Oral vowels
| | | Front | Back |
|---|---|---|---|
| Close | short | i | u |
| Close | long | iː | uː |
| Close-mid | short | e | o |
| Close-mid | long | eː | oː |
| Open-mid | short | ɛ | ɔ |
| Open-mid | long | ɛː | ɔː |
| Open | short | a | |
| Open | long | aː | |

Nasal vowels
| | | Front | Back |
|---|---|---|---|
| Close | short | ĩ | ũ |
| Close | long | ĩː | ũː |
| Close-mid | short | ẽ | õ |
| Close-mid | long | ẽː | õː |
| Open-mid | short | ɛ̃ | ɔ̃ |
| Open-mid | long | ɛ̃ː | ɔ̃ː |
| Open | short | ã | |
| Open | long | ãː | |

=== Tone ===
Senara has low, rising, and high tones.

== Writing system ==
Syenara alphabet (Mali, 1982)
| A | B | C | D | E | Ɛ | F | G | GB | H | I | J | K | KP | L | M | N | Ɲ | Ŋ | O | Ɔ | P | R | S | SH | T | U | V | W | Y | Z | ZH |
| a | b | c | d | e | ɛ | f | g | gb | h | i | j | k | kp | l | m | n | ɲ | ŋ | o | ɔ | p | r | s | sh | t | u | v | w | y | z | zh |
