= Nanerigé language =

Senufo language of Burkina Faso

Nanerigé
- Naani
- Native to: Burkina Faso
- Native speakers: (50,000 cited 1985 census)
- Language family: Niger–Congo?: Atlantic–Congo; Senufo; Suppire–Mamara; Nanerigé

Language codes
- ISO 639-3: sen
- Glottolog: nane1238
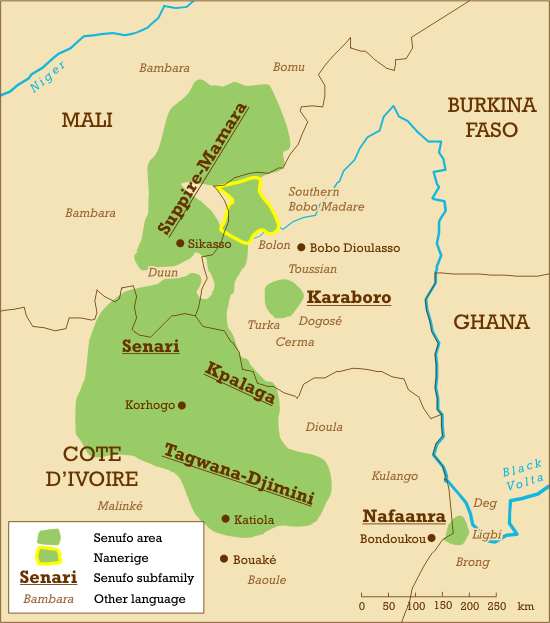
- The Nanerigé area, some neighbouring languages and the other Senufo languages

Nanerigé is a Senufo language spoken in south-western Burkina Faso.
