= Semandang language =

Language

Semandang
- Native to: Indonesia
- Region: Kalimantan
- Native speakers: 20,000 (2004)
- Language family: Austronesian: Malayo-Polynesian; Land Dayak; Southern Land Dayak; Semandang

Language codes
- ISO 639-3: sdq
- Glottolog: sema1269

Semandang, or Onya Darat, is a Dayak language of Borneo.

In 2020, the original ISO 639-3 code for Semandang was split into three separate codes for Beginci, Gerai, and Semandang.
