= Karaboro languages =

Dialect continuum in Burkina Faso

Karaboro
- Geographic distribution: southern Burkina Faso
- Linguistic classification: Niger–Congo?: Atlantic–Congo; Senufo; Central; Karaboro
- Subdivisions: Kar (Eastern Karaboro); Syer-Tenyer (Western Karaboro)

Language codes
- Glottolog: kara1479
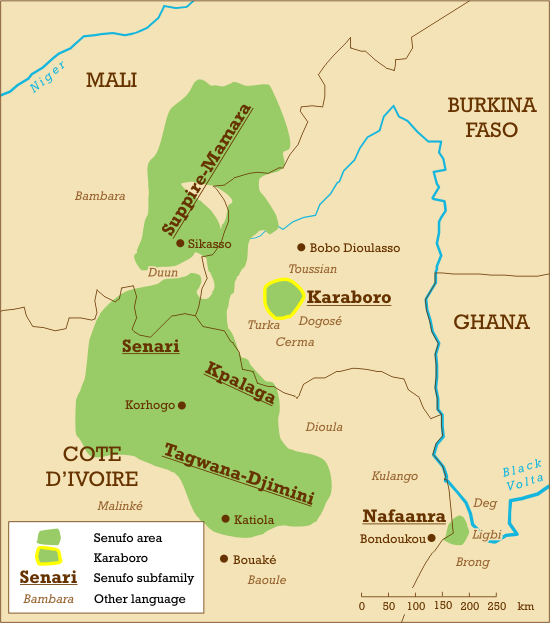
- Karaboro, some neighbouring languages and the Senufo language area.

The Karaboro languages are a dialect continuum spoken in Burkina Faso. They belong to the Senufo subfamily, but are geographically separated from other Senufo languages by a small band of unrelated languages. Linguistically, they share phonetic, morphological, and lexical features separate them from other Senufo languages. Within Senufo they are thought to be most closely related to the Senari languages.

Karaboro is commonly divided into two languages: Syer-Tenyer, or Western Karaboro; and Kar, or Eastern Karaboro. The two languages are closely related but have limited mutual intelligibility. Syer was spoken by an estimated 65,000 people in 2015, often with Jula as their second language.

== Bibliography ==
- Hook, A., R. Mills and E. Mills (1975). L'Enquête Dialectale Karabora, Société Internationale de Linguistique and University of Ouagadougou.
- Mills, Elizabeth (1984) Senoufo phonology, discourse to syllable (a prosodic approach) SIL publications in linguistics (ISSN 1040-0850), 72.
