= Senufo languages =

Language family of West Africa

Senufo
- Senoufo
- Geographic distribution: northern Ivory Coast, southern Mali, southwestern Burkina Faso, western Ghana
- Linguistic classification: Niger–Congo?: Atlantic–Congo; Senufo
- Subdivisions: Suppire–Mamara; Karaboro; Senari; Kpalaga (Palaka); Tagwana–Djimini; Nafaanra

Language codes
- ISO 639-3: –
- Glottolog: senu1239
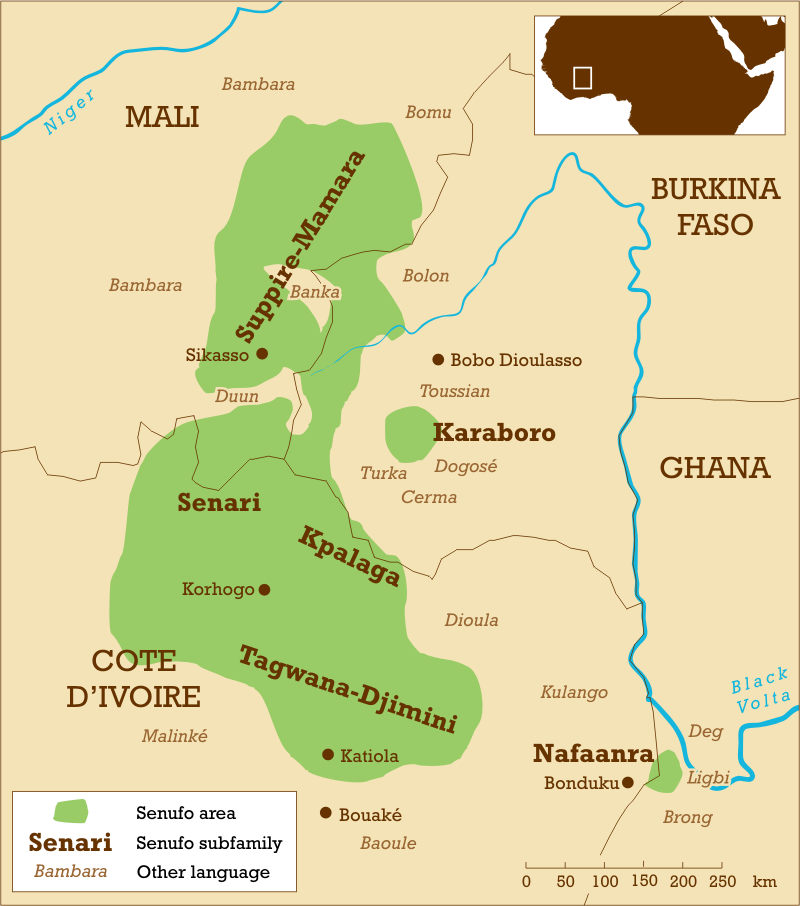
- Map of the Senufo language area showing the major groups and some neighbouring languages.

The Senufo or Senufic languages (French: Senoufo) comprise around 15 languages spoken by the Senufo in the north of Ivory Coast, the south of Mali and the southwest of Burkina Faso. An isolated language, Nafaanra, is also spoken in the west of Ghana. The Senufo languages constitute their own branch of the Atlantic–Congo sub-family of the Niger–Congo languages. Anne Garber estimates the total number of Senufos at some 1.5 million; the Ethnologue, based on various population estimates, counts 2.7 million.

The Senufo languages are bounded to the west by Mande languages, to the south by Kwa languages, and to the north and east by Central Gur languages.

The Senufo languages are like the Gur languages in that they have a suffixal noun class system and that verbs are marked for aspect. Most Gur languages to the north of Senufo have a two tone downstep system, but the tonal system of the Senufo languages is mostly analysed as a three level tone system (High, Mid, Low).

The Senufo languages have been influenced by the neighbouring Mande languages in numerous ways. Many words have been borrowed from the Mande languages Bambara and Jula. Carlson notes that "it is probable that several grammatical constructions are calques on the corresponding Bambara constructions". Like Mande languages, the Senufo languages have a subject–object–verb (SOV) constituent order, rather than the subject–verb–object (SVO) order which is more common in Gur and in Niger–Congo as a whole.

== Classification ==
Delafosse was the first linguist to write on the Senufo languages. He noted that the Senufo were often confused with the Mande, partly because use of Mande languages by the Senufo was widespread:

[L]a langue mandé s'est répandue parmi eux, des alliances nombreuses ont eu lieu... C'est là l'origine de la confusion que l'on a faite souvent entre Mandé et Sénoufo ... alors que, au triple point de vue ethnographique, antropologique et linguistique, la différence est profonde entre ces deux familles.

In the influential classifications of Westermann and Bendor-Samuel, the Senufo languages were classified as Gur languages. In 1975, this classification was called into doubt by Gabriel Manessy. In 1989, John Naden, in his overview of the Gur family, stated that ‘[t]he remaining languages, especially Senufo, may well be no more closely related to Central Gur than to Guang or Togo Remnant, or than these to Central Gur or Volta-Comoe’.

== Subclassification ==
Early Senufo classifications were mainly geographically motivated, dividing the Senufo languages into Northern, Central, and Southern Senufo. In subsequent years, this terminology was adopted by several linguists working on Senufo languages. Mensah (1983) and Mills (1984) avoided this geographical terms but used mainly the same grouping. SIL International in its Ethnologue subdivides the Senufo languages in six groups. Combining the two classifications results in the grouping below.

Northern Senufo

- Suppire–Mamara languages
  - Mamara (Minyanka, Mianka) (740,000 speakers)
  - Nanerigé (Nanergé) (50,000 speakers)
  - Sucite (Sicite, Sìcìté) (38,000 speakers)
  - Supyire (Suppire, Shempire, Syempire) (spoken in Mali) (460,000 speakers)

Central Senufo

- Karaboro languages
  - Eastern Karaboro (Kar) (40,000 speakers)
  - Western Karaboro (Syer-Tenyer) (30,000 speakers)
- Senari languages
  - Cebaara (Tyebaala) (860,000 speakers)
  - Senara (spoken in Côte d'Ivoire) (210,000 speakers)
  - Nyarafolo (60,000 speakers)
- Kpalaga (Palaka) (spoken in Côte d'Ivoire) (8,000 speakers)

Southern Senufo

- Tagwana–Djimini languages
  - Djimini (Dyimini) (spoken in Côte d'Ivoire) (96,000 speakers)
  - Tagwana (Tagouna) (140,000 speakers)
- Nafaanra (Nafaara) (61,000 speakers)
