= Minyanka language =

Senufo language spoken in Mali

Minyaka
- Mamara
- Native to: Mali
- Native speakers: (740,000 cited 2000)
- Language family: Niger–Congo?: Atlantic–Congo; Senufo; Suppire–Mamara; Minyaka

Language codes
- ISO 639-3: myk
- Glottolog: mama1271
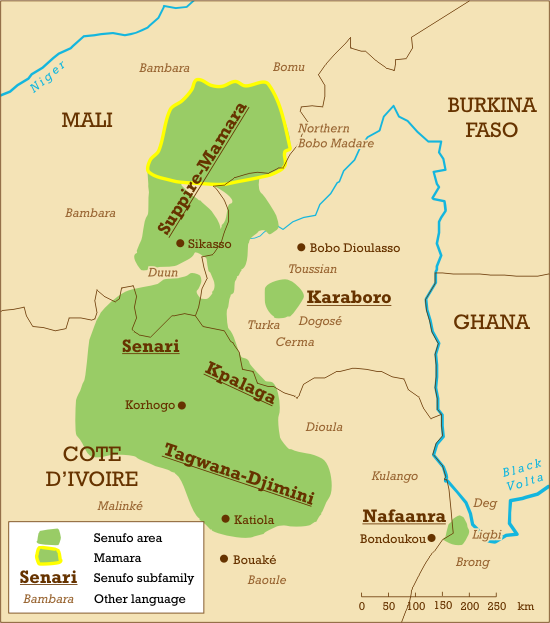
- Map showing where Mamara is spoken.

Minyanka (also known as Mamara, Miniyanka, Minya, Mianka, Minianka, or Tupiire) is a northern Senufo language spoken by about 750,000 people in southeastern Mali. It is closely related to Supyire. Minyanka is one of the national languages of Mali.

== Phonology ==
=== Consonants ===
		Labial			Alveolar	Palatal	Velar		Labio- velar	Pharyn- geal	Glottal
		plain	lab.	pal.	Alveolar	Palatal	plain	pal.	Labio- velar	Pharyn- geal	Glottal
Nasal		m	mʷ	mʲ	n	ɲ	ŋ		ŋ͡m		
Plosive	voiceless	p	pʷ	pʲ	t	c	k	kʲ	k͡p		ʔ
Plosive	voiced	b	bʷ		d	ɟ	ɡ	ɡʲ	ɡ͡b		
Plosive	prenasal	ᵐb			ⁿd	ᶮɟ	ᵑɡ				
Fricative	voiceless	f	fʷ	fʲ	s	ʃ					(h)
Fricative	voiced	v			z	ʒ				(ʕ)	(ɦ)
Rhotic					r						
Approximant					l	j	w	wʲ			

- A pharyngeal fricative [ʕ] is also typically heard when in between vowels, or as an allophone of /ɡ/ when in intervocalic position.
- Glottal sounds [h, ɦ] are only heard in the Bla dialect, instead of labio-velar sounds /k͡p, ɡ͡b, ŋ͡m/.
- Sounds /k, ɡ/ can also be heard as fricatives [x, ɣ] when in intervocalic positions.

=== Vowels ===
	Front	Central	Back
Close	i ĩ		u ũ
Close-mid	e	ə	o
Open-mid	ɛ ɛ̃	ə	ɔ ɔ̃
Open		a ã	

- /u/ can also be heard as [y] when in the position of /j/.
- /o/ can also be heard as [œ] when before a glottal /ʔ/.

== See also ==
- Senufo language
