= Nyarafolo language =

Senugo language spoken in Ivory Coast

Nyarafolo
- Senari
- Native to: Ivory Coast
- Native speakers: 60,000 (2009)
- Language family: Niger–Congo?: Atlantic–Congo; Senufo; Senari; Nyarafolo

Language codes
- ISO 639-3: sev
- Glottolog: nyar1245

A Nyarafolo speaker, recorded in France.

Nyarafolo (Niafolo), one of a cluster of languages called Senari, is a Senufo language of Ivory Coast.
