= Cebaara language =

Senufo language spoken in Ivory Coast

Cebaara
- Senari
- Native to: Ivory Coast
- Native speakers: (860,000 cited 1993)
- Language family: Niger–Congo?: Atlantic–Congo; Senufo; Senari; Cebaara

Language codes
- ISO 639-3: sef
- Glottolog: ceba1235

Cebaara (Tyebala), one of a cluster of languages called Senari, is a major Senufo language, spoken by a million people in Ivory Coast.

== Phonology ==
Cebaara has the following sound inventory:

=== Consonants ===
		Labial	Alveolar	Palatal	Velar	Labio- velar	Glottal
Plosive	voiceless	p	t	c	k	k͡p	ʔ
Plosive	voiced	b	d	ɟ	ɡ	ɡ͡b	
Fricative	voiceless	f	s				
Fricative	voiced	v	z				
Nasal		m	n	ɲ	ŋ		
Rhotic			r				
Lateral			l				
Approximant				j		w	

- /b/ can be heard as a voiced fricative [β] when in intervocalic position.
- Voiceless stops /p, t/ can occur as slightly voiced before /i/ as [p̬, t̬]
- /s/ can be palatalized before an /i/, and can be recognized as a post-alveolar fricative [ʃ] before another vowel in /siV/ position.
- Palatal sounds /c, ɟ/ can also be heard as affricate sounds [t͡ʃ, d͡ʒ] within free variation.
- /ŋ/ can also be heard as a post-nasal [ɡ ̃] within word final positions.

=== Vowels ===
	Oral vowels			Nasal vowels		
	Front	Central	Back	Front	Central	Back
Close	i iː		u uː	ĩ ĩː		ũ ũː
Close-mid	e eː	ə	o oː			
Open-mid	ɛ ɛː	ə	ɔ ɔː	ɛ̃ ɛ̃ː		ɔ̃ ɔ̃ː
Open		a aː			ã ãː	

- Vowels /e, o/ can be realized as [ɪ, ʊ] when in shortened form.
