= Djimini language =

Niger–Congo language spoken in Ivory Coast

Djimini
- Native to: Ivory Coast
- Region: Dabakala Department
- Ethnicity: Djimini people
- Native speakers: (96,000 cited 1993)
- Language family: Niger–Congo?: Atlantic–Congo; Senufo; Tagwana–Djimini; Djimini

Language codes
- ISO 639-3: dyi
- Glottolog: djim1235

Djimini (Jinmini) is a southern Senufo language of Ivory Coast. Blacksmiths among the Djimini once spoke Tonjon, a Mande language.
