= Bumbita/Muhian Rural LLG =

Local-level government in Papua New Guinea

- Location within Papua New Guinea
- Coordinates: 3.639217°S 142.838175°E
- Country: Papua New Guinea
- Province: East Sepik Province
- Time zone: UTC+10 (AEST)

Bumbuita/Muhiang Rural LLG is a local-level government (LLG) of East Sepik Province, Papua New Guinea. The Muhian language and Bumbita language, which are both Torricelli languages belonging to the Arapesh group, are spoken in this LLG.

== Wards ==
- 01. Albinama 1
- 02. Timigir
- 03. Balif 1
- 04. Salata
- 05. Bonohol
- 06. Urita
- 07. Malohum
- 08. Kamanakor
- 09. Sunuhu 1
- 10. Mui 1
- 11. Utamup
- 12. Ilahita 1
- 13. Ilahita 3
- 14. Albinama 2
- 15. Ilahita 4
- 16. Numangu
- 17. Taunangas
