= Mamadou Diouf =

Mamadou Diouf may refer to:

- Mamadou Diouf (historian), professor of African studies and Western African history
- Mamadou Diouf (footballer) (born 1990), Senegalese footballer
- Mamadou Diouf (musician), musician and writer of Senegalese descent
