= Noun class =

Linguistic category of nouns

In linguistics, a noun class is a particular category of nouns. A noun may belong to a given class because of the characteristic features of its referent, such as gender, animacy, shape, but such designations are often clearly conventional. Some authors use the term "grammatical gender" as a synonym of "noun class", but others consider these different concepts. Noun classes should not be confused with noun classifiers.

== Notion ==
There are three main ways by which natural languages categorize nouns into noun classes:

- according to similarities in their meaning (semantic criterion);
- by grouping them with other nouns that have similar form (morphology);
- through an arbitrary convention.

Usually, a combination of the three types of criteria is used, though one is more prevalent.

Noun classes form a system of grammatical agreement. A noun in a given class may require:

- agreement affixes on adjectives, pronouns, numerals, etc. in the same noun phrase,
- agreement affixes on the verb,
- a special form of pronoun to replace the noun,
- an affix on the noun,
- a class-specific word in the noun phrase.

Modern English expresses noun classes through the third person singular personal pronouns he (male person), she (female person), and it (object, abstraction, or animal), and their other inflected forms. Countable and uncountable nouns are distinguished by the choice of many/much. The choice between the relative pronoun who (persons) and which (non-persons) may also be considered a form of agreement with a semantic noun class. A few nouns also exhibit vestigial noun classes, such as stewardess, where the suffix -ess added to steward denotes a female person. This type of noun affixation is not very frequent in English, but quite common in languages which have the true grammatical gender, including most of the Indo-European family, to which English belongs.

In languages without inflectional noun classes, nouns may still be extensively categorized by independent particles called noun classifiers.

=== Common criteria for noun classes ===
Common criteria that define noun classes include:

- animate vs. inanimate (as in Ojibwe)
- rational vs. non-rational (as in Tamil)
- human vs. non-human
- human vs. animal (zoic) vs. inanimate
- male vs. other
- male human vs. other (as in Polish in masculine virile)
- masculine vs. feminine
- masculine vs. feminine vs. neuter
- common vs. neuter
- strong vs. weak
- augmentative vs. diminutive
- countable vs. uncountable

== Language families ==
=== Algonquian languages ===
The Ojibwe language and other members of the Algonquian languages distinguish between animate and inanimate classes. Some sources argue that the distinction is between things which are powerful and things which are not. Living things, as well as sacred things and things connected to the Earth, are considered powerful and belong to the animate class. Still, the assignment is somewhat arbitrary, as "raspberry" is animate, but "strawberry" is inanimate.

=== Athabaskan languages ===
In Navajo (Southern Athabaskan) nouns are classified according to their animacy, shape, and consistency. Morphologically, however, the distinctions are not expressed on the nouns themselves, but on the verbs of which the nouns are the subject or direct object. For example, in the sentence Shi’éé’ tsásk’eh bikáa’gi dah siłtsooz "My shirt is lying on the bed", the verb siłtsooz "lies" is used because the subject shi’éé’ "my shirt" is a flat, flexible object. In the sentence Siziiz tsásk’eh bikáa’gi dah silá "My belt is lying on the bed", the verb silá "lies" is used because the subject siziiz "my belt" is a slender, flexible object.

Koyukon (Northern Athabaskan) has a more intricate system of classification. Like Navajo, it has classificatory verb stems that classify nouns according to animacy, shape, and consistency. However, in addition to these verb stems, Koyukon verbs have what are called "gender prefixes" that further classify nouns. That is, Koyukon has two different systems that classify nouns: (a) a classificatory verb system and (b) a gender system. To illustrate, the verb stem -tonh is used for enclosed objects. When -tonh is combined with different gender prefixes, it can result in daaltonh which refers to objects enclosed in boxes or etltonh which refers to objects enclosed in bags.

=== Australian Aboriginal languages ===
The Dyirbal language is well known for its system of four noun classes, which tend to be divided along the following semantic lines:

1. animate objects, men
2. women, water, fire, violence
3. edible fruit and vegetables
4. miscellaneous (includes things not classifiable in the first three)

The class usually labeled "feminine", for instance, includes the word for fire and nouns relating to fire, as well as all dangerous creatures and phenomena. (This inspired the title of the George Lakoff book Women, Fire, and Dangerous Things.)

The Ngangikurrunggurr language has noun classes reserved for canines and hunting weapons. The Anindilyakwa language has a noun class for things that reflect light. The Diyari language distinguishes only between female and other objects. Perhaps the most noun classes in any Australian language are found in Yanyuwa, which has 16 noun classes, including nouns associated with food, trees and abstractions, in addition to separate classes for men and masculine things, women and feminine things. In the men's dialect, the classes for men and for masculine things have simplified to a single class, marked the same way as the women's dialect marker reserved exclusively for men.

=== Basque ===
Basque has two classes, animate and inanimate; however, the only difference is in the declension of locative cases (inessive, ablative, allative, terminal allative, and directional allative). For inanimate nouns, the locative case endings are attached directly if the noun is singular, and plural and indefinite number are marked by the suffixes -eta- and -(e)ta-, respectively, before the case ending (this is in contrast to the non-locative cases, which follow a different system of number marking where the indefinite form of the ending is the most basic). For example, the noun etxe "house" has the singular ablative form etxetik "from the house", the plural ablative form etxeetatik "from the houses", and the indefinite ablative form etxetatik (the indefinite form is mainly used with determiners that precede the noun: zenbat etxetatik "from how many houses"). For animate nouns, on the other hand, the locative case endings are attached (with some phonetic adjustments) to the suffix -gan-, which is itself attached to the singular, plural, or indefinite genitive case ending. Alternatively, -gan- may attach to the absolutive case form of the word if it ends in a vowel. For example, the noun ume "child" has the singular ablative form umearengandik or umeagandik "from the child", the plural ablative form umeengandik "from the children", and the indefinite ablative form umerengandik or umegandik (cf. the genitive forms umearen, umeen, and umeren and the absolutive forms umea, umeak, and ume). In the inessive case, the case suffix is replaced entirely by -gan for animate nouns (compare etxean "in/at the house" and umearengan/umeagan "in/at the child").

=== Caucasian languages ===
Some members of the Northwest Caucasian family, and almost all of the Northeast Caucasian languages, manifest noun class. In the Northeast Caucasian family, only Lezgian, Udi, and Aghul do not have noun classes. Some languages have only two classes, whereas Bats has eight. The most widespread system, however, has four classes: male, female, animate beings and certain objects, and finally a class for the remaining nouns. The Andi language has a noun class reserved for insects.

Among Northwest Caucasian languages, only Abkhaz and Abaza have noun class, making use of a human male/human female/non-human distinction.

In all Caucasian languages that manifest class, it is not marked on the noun itself but on the dependent verbs, adjectives, pronouns and postpositions or prepositions.

=== Atlantic–Congo languages ===
Atlantic–Congo languages can have ten or more noun classes, defined according to non-sexual criteria. Certain nominal classes are reserved for humans. The Fula language has about 26 noun classes (the exact number varies slightly by dialect).

==== Bantu languages ====
According to Carl Meinhof, the Bantu languages have a total of 22 noun classes called nominal classes (this notion was introduced by W. H. I. Bleek). While no single language is known to express all of them, most of them have at least 10 noun classes. For example, by Meinhof's numbering, Shona has 21 classes, Swahili has 15, Sotho has 18 and Ganda has 17.

Additionally, there are polyplural noun classes. A polyplural noun class is a plural class for more than one singular class. For example, Proto-Bantu class 10 contains plurals of class 9 nouns and class 11 nouns, while class 6 contains plurals of class 5 nouns and class 15 nouns. Classes 6 and 10 are inherited as polyplural classes by most surviving Bantu languages, but many languages have developed new polyplural classes that are not widely shared by other languages.

Specialists in Bantu emphasize that there is a clear difference between genders (such as known from Afro-Asiatic and Indo-European) and nominal classes (such as known from Niger–Congo). Languages with nominal classes divide nouns formally on the base of hyperonymic meanings. The category of nominal class replaces not only the category of gender, but also the categories of number and case.

Critics of Meinhof's approach notice that his numbering system of nominal classes counts singular and plural numbers of the same noun as belonging to separate classes. This seems to them to be inconsistent with the way other languages are traditionally considered, where number is orthogonal to gender (according to the critics, a Meinhof-style analysis would give Ancient Greek 9 genders). If one follows broader linguistic tradition and counts singular and plural as belonging to the same class, then Swahili has 8 or 9 noun classes, Sotho has 11 and Ganda has 10.

The Meinhof numbering tends to be used in scientific works dealing with comparisons of different Bantu languages. For instance, in Swahili the word rafiki 'friend' belongs to the class 9 and its "plural form" is marafiki of the class 6, even if most nouns of the 9 class have the plural of the class 10. For this reason, noun classes are often referred to by combining their singular and plural forms, e.g., rafiki would be classified as "9/6", indicating that it takes class 9 in the singular, and class 6 in the plural.

However not all Bantu languages have these exceptions. In Ganda each singular class has a corresponding plural class (apart from one class which has no singular–plural distinction; also some plural classes correspond to more than one singular class) and there are no exceptions as there are in Swahili. For this reason Ganda linguists use the orthogonal numbering system when discussing Ganda grammar (other than in the context of Bantu comparative linguistics), giving the 10 traditional noun classes of that language.

The distinction between genders and nominal classes is blurred still further by Indo-European languages that have nouns that behave like Swahili's rafiki. Italian, for example, has a group of nouns deriving from Latin neuter nouns that acts as masculine in the singular but feminine in the plural: il braccio/le braccia; l'uovo/le uova. (These nouns are still placed in a neuter gender of their own by some grammarians.)

===== Nominal classes in Swahili =====
Class number	Prefix	Typical meaning
1	m-, mw-, mu-	singular: persons
2	wa-, w-	plural: persons (a plural counterpart of class 1)
3	m-, mw-, mu-	singular: plants
4	mi-, my-	plural: plants (a plural counterpart of class 3)
5	ji-, j-, Ø-	singular: fruits
6	ma-, m-	plural: fruits (a plural counterpart of class 5, 9, 11, seldom 1)
7	ki-, ch-	singular: things
8	vi-, vy-	plural: things (a plural counterpart of class 7)
9	n-, ny-, m-, Ø-	singular: animals, things
10	n-, ny-, m-, Ø-	plural: animals, things (a plural counterpart of class 9 and 11)
11, 14	u-, w-, uw-	singular: no clear semantics
15	ku-, kw-	verbal nouns
16	pa-	locative meanings: close to something
17	ku-	indefinite locative or directive meaning
18	mu-, m-	locative meanings: inside something

"Ø-" means no prefix. Some classes are homonymous (esp. 9 and 10). The Proto-Bantu class 12 disappeared in Swahili, class 13 merged with 7, and 14 with 11.

Class prefixes appear also on adjectives and verbs, e.g.:

Kitabu kikubwa kinaanguka.
CL7-book CL7-big CL7-PRS-fall
'The big book falls.'

The class markers which appear on the adjectives and verbs may differ from the noun prefixes:

Mtoto wangu alinunua kitabu.
CL1-child CL1-my CL1-PST-CL7-buy CL7-book
'My child bought a book.'

In this example, the verbal prefix a- and the pronominal prefix wa- are in concordance with the noun prefix m-: they all express class 1 despite their different forms.

==== Zande ====
The Zande language distinguishes four noun classes:

Criterion	Example	Translation
human (male)	kumba	man
human (female)	dia	wife
animate	nya	beast
other	bambu	house

There are about 80 inanimate nouns which are in the animate class, including nouns denoting heavenly objects (moon, rainbow), metal objects (hammer, ring), edible plants (sweet potato, pea), and non-metallic objects (whistle, ball). Many of the exceptions have a round shape, and some can be explained by the role they play in Zande mythology.

== Noun classes versus grammatical gender ==
The term "gender", as used by some linguists, refers to a noun-class system composed with two, three, or four classes, particularly if the classification is semantically based on a distinction between masculine and feminine. Genders are then considered a sub-class of noun classes. Not all linguists recognize a distinction between noun-classes and genders, however, and instead use either the term "gender" or "noun class" for both.

Sometimes the distinction can drift over time. For instance, in Danish, the main dialects merged the three original genders down to a total of two genders. Some other dialects merged all three genders down to almost a one gender similar to English, but kept the neuter adjective form for uncountable nouns (which are all neuter in Danish). This effectively created a noun class system of countable and uncountable nouns reflected in adjectives.

== Noun classes versus noun classifiers ==
Some languages, such as Japanese, Chinese and the Tai languages, have elaborate systems of particles that go with nouns based on shape and function, but are free morphemes rather than affixes. Because the classes defined by these classifying words are not generally distinguished in other contexts, there are many linguists who take the view that they do not create noun classes.

== List of languages by type of noun classification ==
=== Languages with noun classes ===
- Atlantic languages (Niger–Congo language family)
  - Fula (Fulfulde, Pulaar, Pular)
  - Wolof
- all Bantu languages (Niger–Congo language family) such as
  - Ganda: ten classes called simply Class I to Class X and containing all sorts of arbitrary groupings but often characterised as people, long objects, animals, miscellaneous objects, large objects and liquids, small objects, languages, pejoratives, infinitives, mass nouns, plus four 'locative' classes. Alternatively, the Meinhof system of counting singular and plural as separate classes gives a total of 21 classes including the four locatives.
  - Swahili
  - Zulu
- Northeast Caucasian languages such as Bats
- Dyirbal: Masculine, feminine, vegetable and other. (Some linguists do not regard the noun-class system of this language as grammatical gender.)
- Arapesh languages such as Mufian

== See also ==
- Animacy
- Classifier (linguistics)
- Declension
- Grammatical agreement
- Grammatical category
- Grammatical conjugation
- Grammatical gender
- Grammatical number
- Inflection
- Redundancy (linguistics)
- Synthetic language
