= Royal Guyenne Cavalry Regiment =

- Régiment de Royal Guyenne Cavalerie
- Active: 1779–1794
- Country: Kingdom of France; First French Republic
- Allegiance: King of France
- Branch: (Kingdom of France) Armée Royale (France) Armée Française
- Type: Light Cavalry; Line Cavalry
- Size: Regiment
- Part of: Cavalry Corps
- Depot: Bordeaux, Guyenne

The Royal Guyenne Cavalry Regiment (French: Régiment de Royal Guyenne Cavalerie) was a line cavalry regiment of the French Royal Army. Though short-lived, the regiment was the last cavalry regiment to be formed before the French Revolution and was subsequently disbanded in 1803 when it split between the remaining cuirassier regiments.

== Background ==
During the 1770s and 1780s, the French Royal Army was in the process of a complete overhaul and transformation. One of the newest corps to be formed was the Corps de Chevaulégers or Light Cavalry Corps. The regiment would become the 25th and last cavalry regiment to be created before the Revolution. On 29 January 1779, the regiment was formed at the Cavalry School in Metz and named after the province of Guyenne due to the ordnance of 1779.

== Formation ==
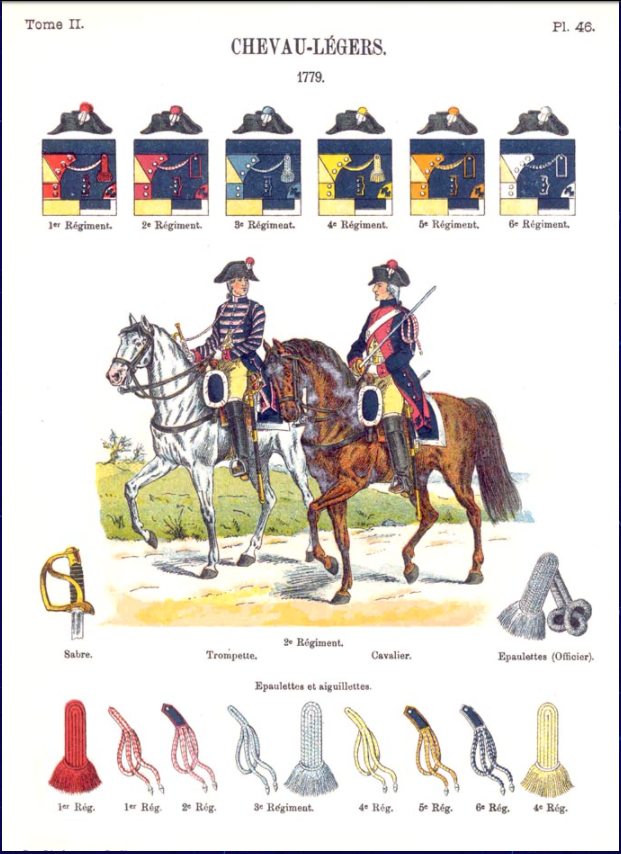
Uniforms of the 6 new light cavalry regiments of the French Royal Army following the 1779 ordnance. The 1st regiment is represented as 1st in the top left corner and their aiguillette is shown 2nd from the left in the bottom left corner.

Under the 1779 reorganisations, the old light cavalry squadrons which had been attached to the line cavalry and dragoons under the 1776 ordnance were grouped into new Light Cavalry Regiments, 'Régiments de Cavalerie Légère'. The new regiment itself was formed by grouping of the squadrons from the Colonel General, Mestre de Camp, Royal, and Commissioner General Cavalry Regiments, or the senior four regiments.

After formation, the new regiment was uniformed as follows: black bicorne with a white Bourbon cockade and red plume, royal blue coat and collars, red facings, cuffs, button flaps, and plumed epaulettes, full white aiguillette over the left shoulder, tan small clothes and breeches, and black fleur-de-lis over the turnbacks.

The new regiment was at first designated simply as the 1st Light Cavalry Regiment, 1ère Régiment de Chevaulégers and along with the other five regiments, took precedence at the end of the line cavalry. Unusually this meant the corps was 2nd in line, being after the line cavalry, but before the hussars, and dragoons (the latter of which was technically not considered part of the cavalry).

Immediately after formation the regiment left Metz for Réthel, then to the Royal Musket Factory in Charleville-Mézières. Thereafter, to Donchéry, and from there to Vaucouleurs in 1781 and Neufchâteau in 1783, and finally to Phalsbourg and Sarrebourg later.

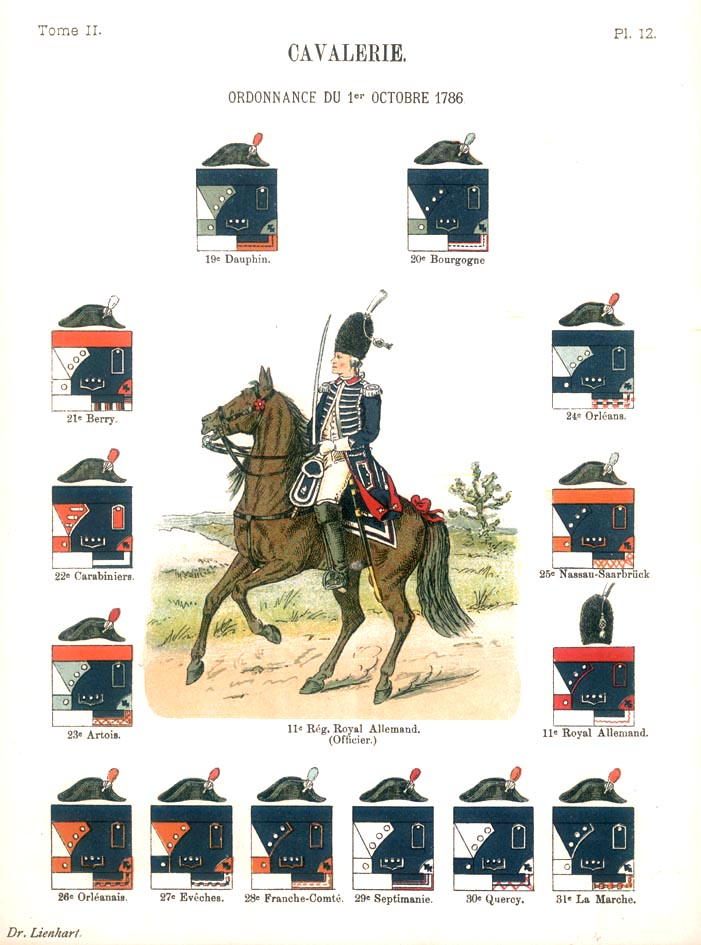
Variations of uniforms of the later group of French line cavalry, the 1st Light Cavalry's new uniform and designation is shown on the bottom left corner.

Under the 1784 ordnance, the light cavalry was abolished and subsequently ordered to absorb into the line cavalry. The 1st Light Cavalry Regiment was therefore renamed as the Orléanais Cavalry Regiment, Régiment de Orléanais Cavalerie, and was 26th in precedence.

When the regiment was absorbed into the line cavalry, its uniform became the following: black bicorne with bourbon white cockade and red over the white plume, royal blue coat with red facings, collars, button-flap trim, epaulette trim, turnbacks, and red saddle with a black waved line throughout, white small clothes and breeches, and white buttons, and black Fleur-de-lis on the turnbacks.

The new name however was short-lived, as following the 1788 ordnance, the regiment was renamed as the Royal Guyenne Cavalry Regiment, Régiment de Royal Guyenne Cavalerie. In the same year the regiment was moved to Moulins, and in 1791 left for Saint-Mihiel, and in 1792 to Sarralbe and Bouquenom.

== Revolution ==
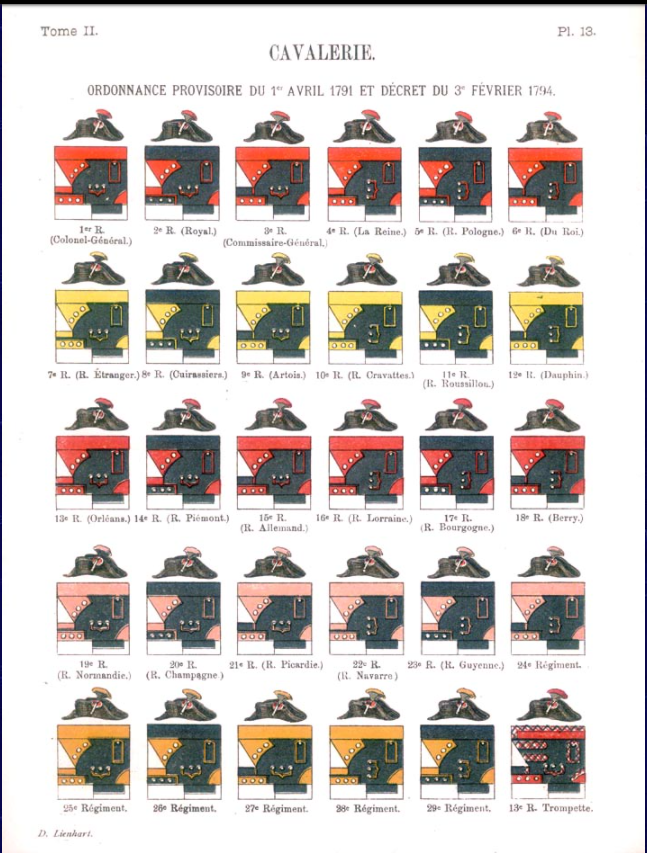
Variations of the French Line Cavalry uniforms following the 1791 provisional ordnance. The Royal Guyenne is represented as 3rd from the right, 4th row.

Following the turmoil of the French Revolution, the new National Assembly abolished the old 'royalist' titles and the regiments were known simply by their number in precedence. Therefore, following the 1 April 1791 ordnance, the Royal Guyenne Cavalry Regiment became known as the 23rd Cavalry Regiment, though the former title remained in barracks use for many years. With the Corps des Carabiniers de Monsieur being removed from precedence and the Mestre de Camp and Royal German Cavalry Regiments emigrating and disbanding, the regiment was moved up to the 22nd precedence, making it the 22nd Cavalry Regiment. It was at this point that the royalist lineage of the regiment ends.

During the revolution, the regiment's uniform was as follows: black bicorne with a light grey cockade and plume, republican dark blue coat and white buttons, light grey facings, cuffs, turnbacks, epaulette trim, button-flap trim, and cuff trim, republican dark blue collars, and white small clothes and breeches.

Much like the other regiments of the French cavalry, the Royal Guyenne cavalry saw very little action during the Revolution. However, in 1791 the regiment was part of the Army of the Ardennes, and by 1793 joined the new Army of the Moselle where it participated in the Siege of Landau with two squadrons present. In 1794, the regiment joined the Army of the North.

== Commanding Officers ==
Below is a list of the commanding officers of the regiment:

- 29 January–13 April 1780, Louis d'Adhémar, Chevalier de Panat
- 13 April 1780–1 January 1784, Joseph Maurice, Comte de Toustain-Viray
- 1 January 1784–10 March 1788, Gabriel Jacques, Comte de Farjonnel
- 10 March 1788–5 February 1792, Gaspard Paulin, Vicomte de Clermont-Tonnerre

== Uniform Gallery ==
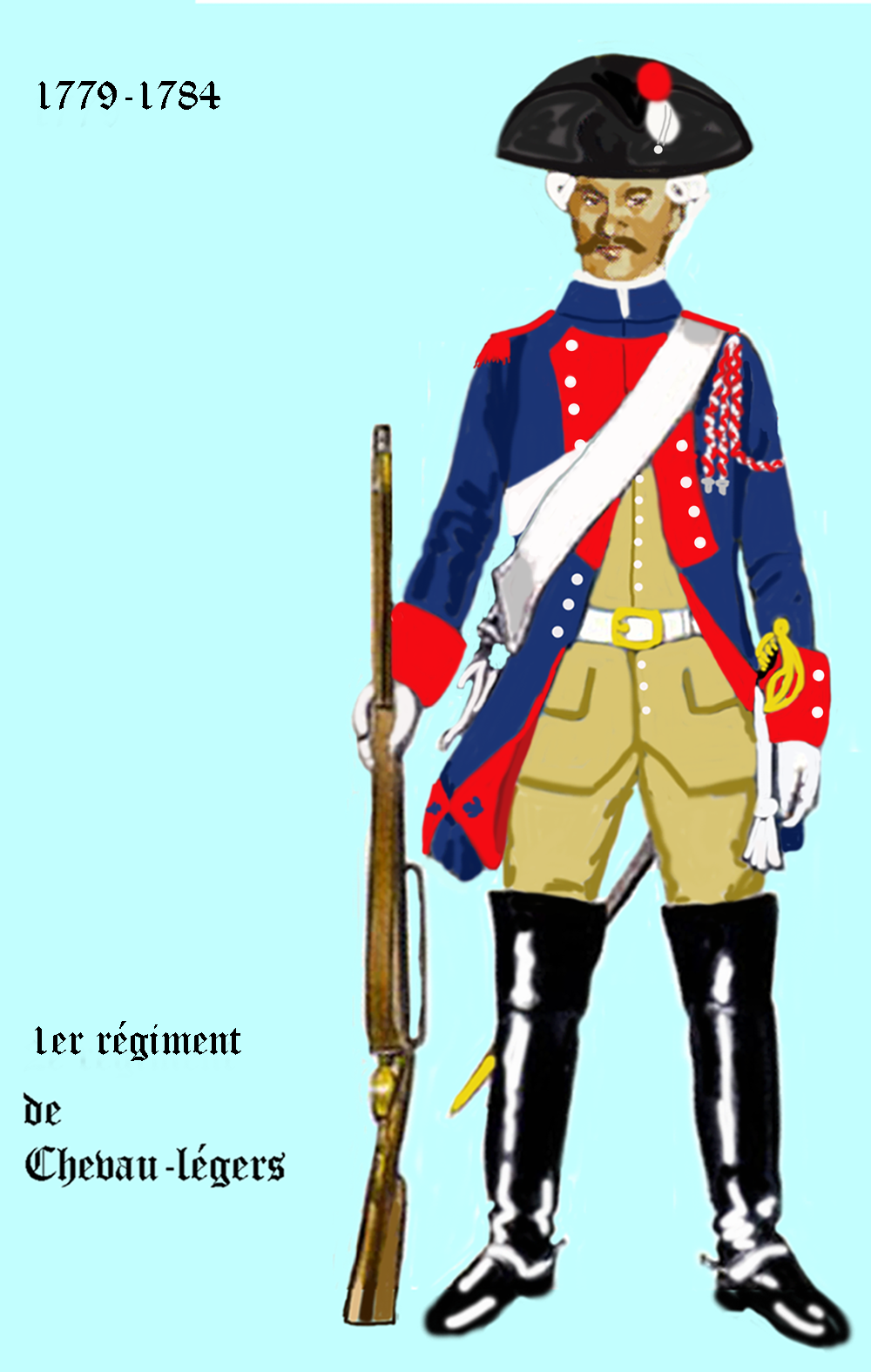
Uniform of the 1st Chevaulégers following their formation in 1779. The similarities to the line cavalry can be soon.

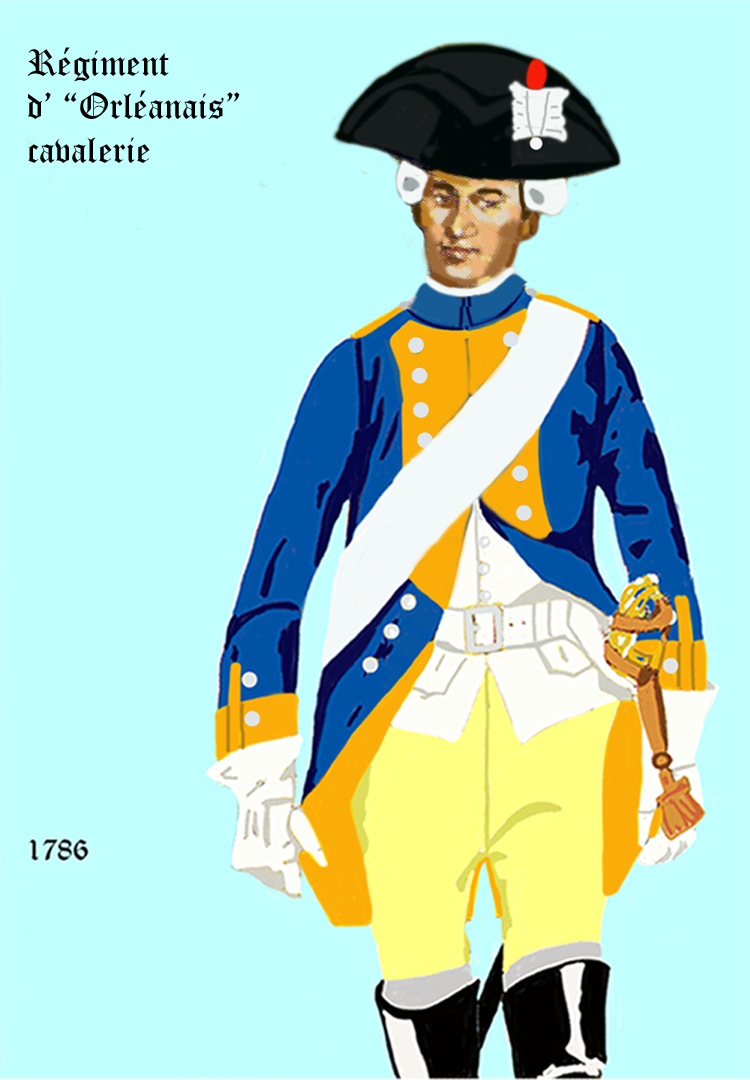
Uniform of the regiment following their absorption back into the line cavalry following the 1786 ordnance.

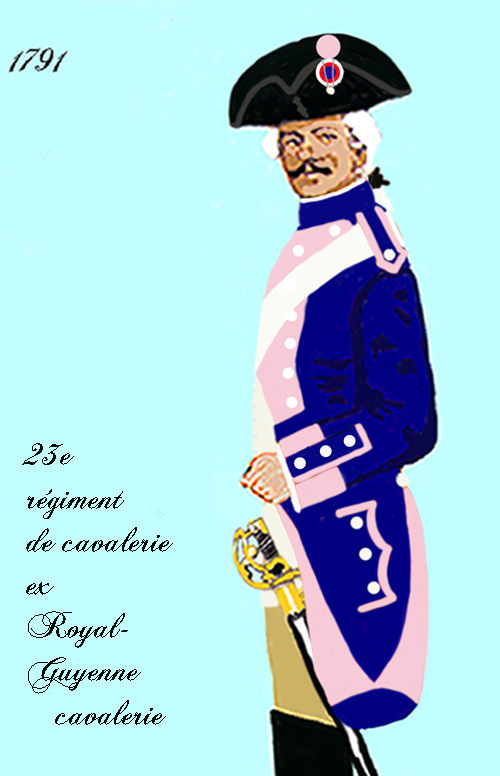
Final uniform of the regiment following the provisional ordnance of 1791, showing the new light grey and republican blue uniform
