= Bukiyip language =

Arapesh language of Papua New Guinea

Bukiyip
- Mountain Arapesh
- Native to: Papua New Guinea
- Region: East Sepik Province
- Native speakers: 16,000 (2003)
- Language family: Torricelli: Arapesh; Bukiyip
- Dialects: Coastal; Mountain (Bukiyip)

Language codes
- ISO 639-3: ape
- Glottolog: buki1249
- ELP: Bukiyip
- Bukiyip is classified as Vulnerable by the UNESCO Atlas of the World's Languages in Danger.

Bukiyip, or Mountain Arapesh, is an Arapesh language (a sub-class of the Torricelli languages) spoken by around 16,000 people between Yangoru and Maprik in the East Sepik Province of Papua New Guinea. Bukiyip follows a SVO sentence structure. The Arapesh languages are known for their complex noun-phrase agreement system; Bukiyip has 18 of these noun classes.

== Classification ==
There are two primary dialects of Bukiyip: Chamaun-Yabonuh and Ilipeim-Yamil (western) and two minor dialects, Buki and Lohuhwim. Given significant variation among dialects, linguist Robert Conrad suggests that Bukiyip is likely part of dialect chain that also involves other Arapesh languages. The dialects may be further generalized as Coastal Arapesh and Mountain Bukiyip.

== Phonology ==
=== Intonation ===
A list of words in the Bukiyip language, collected in the 1980s by UCLA.

Stress is usually placed on the penultimate syllable, which has a higher pitch.

There are four contrastive intonation contours.

1. Final Intonation – falling pitch on the last syllable, followed by a pause
2. Non-final Intonation – level mid pitch on the last syllable, followed by a pause
3. Interrogative Intonation – level mid/high pitch on the last word
4. Imperative Intonation – high pitch and heavy stress throughout clause with a rapid pitch drop on the last syllable

=== Consonants ===
Consonant Phonemes of Bukiyip
		Bilabial	Alveolar	Palatal	Velar/Glottal	
		Bilabial	Alveolar	Palatal	plain	round
Nasal		m	n	ɲ		
Stop	voiceless	p	t	tʃ	k	kʷ
Stop	voiced	b	d	dʒ	ɡ	ɡʷ
Fricative			s		h	hʷ
Rhotic			ɾ			
Lateral			l			
Glide			w	j		

The voiceless stops /p t k/ are all realized with aspiration; the voiced velar /g/ can be produced as [k] (un-aspirated) or [g], depending on its environment. All of the consonants except /ɾ/ can occur word-initially. All consonants except /ɾ d j/ can occur word-finally.

=== Vowels ===
Vowel Phonemes of Bukiyip
	Front	Central	Back
High	i	ɨ	u
Mid	e	ə	o
Low	æ	a	

The vowel system of Bukiyip contains 8 vowels: /i ɨ u o e a æ ə/. These vowels do not contrast for nasality. Bukiyip's vowel system has been shown to exhibit a greater deal of feature economy than other Torricelli languages, but less than languages outside its family like Eastern Mari.

A phonetic analysis of the first formant (F1) for the Bukiyip high vowels /i u/ found that the average F1 for /i/ was 304 Hz, whereas the average F1 for /u/ was 356 Hz. The first formant is inversely associated with vowel height; a lower F1 means a higher vowel. In this case, it was found that Bukiyip /u/ is on average more high than /i/.

Writing System
IPA	Bukiyip alphabet
i	i
e	e
æ	æ
ɨ	ú
ə	é
a	a
u	u
o	o

=== Morphophonemics ===
Bukiyip has 18 basic rules for morphophonemic rules (rules 8–18 primarily apply to the Chamaun-Yabonuh and Buki dialects).

Rule(s)	Example	Notes
V[+central,-round] + C[+palatal] → V[+front] C[+palatal]	pachuh → pechuh	
w + ú → u, ú + w → uw, i + ú → i	iúnak → inak	Semivowel rule.
ny + u → nyú	nyupwe → nyúpwe	Occurs unless another u is in the next syllable.
V[+central,-round,-low] + C[+lab]V[+round] → V[+back]C[+lab]V[+round]	núbo → nubo	
a + CV[+central,-round] → éCV[+central,-round]	nabah → nébah	
V[+central,-round,-low] + C + w → V[+round]Cw	nyúhwech → nyuhwech	
Cw + V[+round] → CV[+round]	éhwahw → ohohw	
i + i → i	iitak → itak	
w + é → wo	kwénak → kwonak → konak	
m + ú → mu	múbo → mubo	Occurs unless the next syllable is C[+voiced]ú.
V[+central,-round] + tV[+round] → otV[+round]	atúwe → otuwe	
e + úk → eik	napeweúk → napweik	
C + CV[+central,-round] → CV[+central,-round]CV[+central,-round]	chagasbúk →chagasúbúk	
ú + C + u → uCu	utúlúgúnu → utulugunu	
ú + C + u# → oCu#	natalúgu → natalogu	
V[+round]C[+lab] + ú → V[+round]C[+lab]u	chaklipomúk → chaklipomuk	
u + ú → uwu	natuúk → natuwuk	
ú + u → o	yekinúumu → yekinomu	

== Words ==
=== Nouns ===
Bukiyip has 18 noun classes, indicated on each noun by a suffix. The noun class suffix will also typically indicate the number of the noun (singular or plural). These noun classes are generally semantically arbitrary; nouns belong to a class but that typically does not indicate anything about the noun. There are, however, a few exceptions to this pattern listed in the table below. Bukiyip pronouns, verbs, demonstratives, adjectives, numerals, and nouns all inflect for grammatical gender.

Noun Classes
Noun Class	Noun Suffix		Adjective Suffix		Verb Prefix		Comments
Noun Class	Singular	Plural	Singular	Plural	Singular	Plural	Comments
1	-b/n	-bús	-bi	-búsi	b-/n-	s-	
2	-bél	-lúb	-bili	-lúbi	bl-	bl-	
3	g/-gú	-s/-as	-gali/-gú	-gasi	g-	s-	
4	-k	-ou/-eb	-kwi	-wali	kw-	w-	The "female" class
5	-m/-bal	-s/-ipi/-bal	-mi/-bali	-si/-ipi/-bali	m-/bl-	s-/p-/bl-	
6	-n/nú	-b	-nali	-bi	n-	b-	Most nature things, along with class 9.
7	-n/nú	-m	-nali	-mi	n-	h-	The "male" class
8	-ny/-l	-ch/-has	-nyi/-li	-chi	ny-/l-	ch-	The "neutral gender" class. Considered the most unmarked.
9	-p	-s	-pi	-si	p-	s-	Most nature things, along with class 6.
10	-l/-ny	-guh	-li/-ny	-guhi	l-/ny-	hw-	
11	-t/-tú	-gw	-tali	-gwi	t-	gw-	
12	-hw	-lúh	-hwi	-lihi	hw-	hl-	
13	-V_{1}h	-V_{2}h	-hi	-h	h-	h-	
14	-s	-s	-si	-si	s-	s-	Words borrowed from Tok Pisin and end in "s".
15	-gún	-gún	-gúni	-gúni	gn-	gn-	
16	-has	-has	-	-	gn-	gn-	
17	-	-	-nali/-kwi	-	n-/kw-	-	Personal names class
18	-	-gún	-	-gúni	gn-	gn-	Place names class

=== Pronouns and demonstratives ===
Pronouns and demonstratives must agree with the noun class and have singular and plural forms, pronouns also encode proximal and distal information.

Noun Class	Singular Pronouns		Plural Pronouns		Singular Demonstratives	Plural Demonstratives
Noun Class	Proximal	Distal	Proximal	Distal	Singular Demonstratives	Plural Demonstratives
1	ébab	babi	ébúsab	babasi	ébúdak	ébúsúdak
2	éblab	babli	éblalúb	balbi	ébúlúdak	élbúdak
3	égag	gagi	égsag	gagasi	égúdak	égúsúdak
4	okok	kwakwi	owou	wawi	oukudak	oudak
5	omom	mami	éblab	babli	omudak	ébúlúdak
6	énan	nani	ébab	babi	énúdak	ébúdak
7	énan	nani	omom	mami	énúdak	omudak
8	enyeny	nyanyi	echech	chachi	enyédak	echédak
9	énap	papi	ésas	sasi	opudak	ésúdak
10	élal	lali	oguhogw	gwaguhi	élúdak	oguhudak
11	état	tati	ogogw	gwagwi	étúdak	ogudak
12	ohohw	hwahwi	éhlah	hlahli	ohudak	éhúlúdak
13	éhah	hahi	ohoh	haehi	éhédak	éhúdak
14	ésas	sasi	ésas	sasi	ésúdak	ésúdak
15	égnag	gani	ogohuh	gwaguhi	égúndak	oguhudak
16	égúgún	gani	égúgún	gani	égúndak	égúndak
17	énan	nani	omom	mami	énúdak	omudak
18	okok	kwakwi	owou	wawi	oukudak	oudak

Personal Pronouns
Person	Singular	Dual	Plural
1st	yek(eik)	ohwak	apak
2nd	nyak(nyek)	bwiepú	ipak
3rd (masculine)	énan/nani	omom bwiom	omom/mami
3rd (feminine)	okok/kwakwi	owo bwiou	owo/wawi
3rd (mixed gender)	-	echech bwiech	echech/chachi

Possessive pronouns have the form: pronoun + -i + unú (noun number class)

=== Verbs ===
==== Verb structure ====
Verbs have a complex structure of affixes encoding mood, object, benefactive, and direction which either have their own classes or must agree with the noun class. The structure is:

Subject (n-) + Mood (u- 'irrealis', a- 'realis') + Object (unú-) + Verb Nucleus (verb root 1–6, verb stem 1–2)+ Object 2 (-unú) + Benefactive (-m 'benefactive' + -unú or -ag 'here') + Directional (-u 'displaced', -i 'toward speaker', '-uk' permanent).

Object 2 and Benefactive may not occur in all verbs.

==== Verb subject prefixes ====
Person	Singular	Dual	Plural
First	i-	w-	m-
Second	ny-	p-	p-

==== Mood marker ====
All verbs (with the exception of class 6) have a mood marker. The realis mood (mood marker 'a-') concerns events that have happened in the past and present. The irrealis mood (mood marker 'u-') concerns future events and events that did not happen in the past (such as in the case of a mistaken memory). The imperative mood (used for commands) and interrogative mood (used for questions) are formed by clausal transformations.

==== Verb object suffixes ====
Person	Singular	Dual	Plural
1st	-uwe/-owe	-ohu	-apú
2nd	-enyú/-inyú	-	-epú
3rd (masculine)	-unú/-an´	-	-om
3rd (feminine)	-ok/-uk	-	-ou
3rd (mixed gender)	-eny/-iny	-	-ech/-ich

==== Verb root classes ====
	Transitive				Intransitive	Stative
	Obligatory Object		Optional Object		Intransitive	Stative
	Prefix	Suffix	Prefix	Suffix	Intransitive	Stative
Optional Free Subject	1	2	3	4 / 8	5	6
Obligatory Free Subject				7		

Class 8 has a second object while class 4 only has one.

=== Adjectives ===
Adjectives consist of a root word followed by the appropriate noun-class suffix (see the noun class table).

=== Adverbs ===
There are three adverb classes in Bukiyip: 'natimogúk' (all) in the irrealis mood and '-nubu' (completely) and '-gamu' (well) in the realis mood. All adverbs are inflected, and may have free or bound stems depending on which modifier slot they are placed in the clausal, phrase, or sentence syntax.

== Counting system ==
There are two basic numeral roots 'atú-' (one) and 'bia-' (two). These numeral prefixes are added to noun root words and then undergo a morphological process (see the Morphophonemics section) that combines them. For example:

atú + -p + utom → atum → otum

or

bia + -ch + batowich → biech

The numeral root 'nobati-' (four) is an exception to this assimilation pattern. In addition to the atú- and bia- numeral roots, there is also a stem éné- meaning one, an, or some depending on context.

== Phrases ==
There are 23 phrase formations in Bukiyip.

=== Verb phrases ===
1. Modified Verb Phrase: Modifier (class 1–2 adverb) + Head (verb class 1–7) + Modifier (class 3 adverb, adverb phrase)

2. Repeated Verb Phrase: Head (verb class 10, motion verb) + Modifier (class 3 adverb) + Head (verb class 10, '-lto') + Modifier

3. Coordinate Verb Phrase: Head (verb class 1–5, coordinate phrase) + Head (verb class 1–5, modified phrase) + Modifier

4. Motion Verb Phrase: Head (motion verb, motion verb phrase) + Head (verb class 3, coordinate verb phrase) + Modifier (adverb class 3)

=== Noun phrases ===
5. Modified Noun Phrase 1: Modifier (demonstrative, numeral phrase, quantitative stem) + Modifier (class 2 adjective, adjective phrase, nominalised clause, limiter phrase) + Possessive (possessive phrase, possessive pronoun) + Head (class 1–15 noun, coordinate noun phrase)

6. Modified Noun Phrase 2: Modifier (noun stem, class 17–18 noun, class 3 locative phrase) + Head (noun)

7. Apposition Noun Phrase: Head (apposition noun phrase, coordinate noun phrase, demonstrative, intensive phrase, class 18 noun, pronoun, temporal stem) + Apposition (clause, nominalised clause, coordinate noun phrase, modified noun phrase, class 17–18 noun, derived noun stem, pronoun, temporal stem) + Identification (pronoun)

8. Coordinate Noun Phrase: Head (apposition noun phrase, modified noun phrase, class 17 noun, pronoun) + Head (apposition noun phrase, modified noun phrase, class 17 noun, pronoun) + Coordinate ('o', 'úli', ⟨n-⟩ + a- + -nú, ⟨n-⟩ + ú- + -nú)

=== Modified noun phrases ===
9. Possessive Phrase: Head (apposition noun phrase, coordinate noun phrase, demonstrative, class 3 locative phrase, modified noun phrase, class 17–18 noun, noun stem) + Possessive (personal pronoun, '-i-')

10. Limiter Phrase: Head (adverb, demonstrative, modified noun phrase, noun stem, pronoun) + Limiter (at- + <únú>, ati)

11. Intensive Phrase: Head (pronoun) + Intensifier ('kénak', 'meho')

12. Instrumental-Benefactor Phrase: Benefactive (umu) + Head (intransitive clause, transitive clause, modified noun phrase)

13. Similarity Phrase: Similarity ('(ko)bwidou(k)') + Head (intransitive clause, transitive clause, demonstrative, pronoun, modified noun phrase) + Similarity ('-umu')

14. Accompaniment Phrase: Head (pronoun, modified noun phrase, apposition noun phrase) + Accompaniment ('nagún')

=== Locative phrase ===
15. Locative Phrase 1: Locative (locative) + Head (locative clause, locative word, class 2–3 locative phrase 2, modified noun phrase, class 18 noun) + Identifier (class 18 noun)

16. Locative Phrase 2: Head (intransitive clause, transitive clause, locative, noun, pronoun) + Locative ('-umu', '-ahah')

17. Locative Phrase 3: Head (class 2 locative) + Head (class 3 locative)

=== Temporal phrase ===
18. Temporal Phrase 1: Head (temporal stem) + Temporal ('-abali')

19. Temporal Phrase 2: Modifier ('húlúkati-mu) + Head (temporal word)

20. Serial Temporal Phrase: Head (temporal word) + Head (temporal word)

=== Numeral phrase ===
21. Numeral Phrase: Head (modified noun phrase, numeral stem) + Head (numeral stem) + Head (numeral stem)

=== Interrogative phrase ===
22. Interrogative Phrase: Modifier (interrogative word) + Head (class 1–14 noun)

=== Adjective/adverb phrase ===
23. Adjective Phrase: Head (adjective stem) + Head (adjective stem) 1–14 noun
