= Masculine virile =

Feature of Polish grammar

Masculine virile is an issue relating to verbs and/or nouns in some languages, such as Polish, which refer to male humans but not male animals. These forms are irregular and rather conventional, to be memorized, akin to masculine/feminine distinction in German grammar. They are therefore not to be confused with mere animacy.

== Polish language ==
In Polish, for the word Murzyn that can be translated into English as "Black man", the standard nominative plural is Murzyni, which is using the "personal masculine" suffix, while the impersonal suffix (that is: Murzyny) is pejorative, because it puts Black men in the same (grammatic) category as animals.

In Polish one would say to a group of animals, girls or adult women "Co zrobiłyście?" ("What did you do?"), but "Co zrobiliście?" to a group of boys or men.

== Czech language ==
There is a distinction in the use of plural possessive suffixes '-ovi'/'ovy'. If the possessed objects are masculine animate, then 'ovi' is used, otherwise 'ovy', keping in mind that abstract terms are treated as inanimate, even though they may refer to (categories of) persons, while deceased persons are still animate. Examples:

- Romanovi synové (sons of Roman)
- Svědkové Jehovovi (Jehovah's Witnesses)
- Romanovy sestry (sisters of Roman)
- Romanovy boty (Roman's shoes)
- Baronovi sluhové (baron's servants)
