= Murzyn =

Polish word for a black person

Murzyn (Polish pronunciation: [muʐɨn]) is a common Polish word for a Black person of Sub-Saharan African descent, cognate with the English word "Moor". Since the late 20th century, some Black people residing in Poland consider it offensive.

== Etymology ==
The word "Murzyn" derives from a Czech borrowing (mouřenín) of the German word Mohr, stemming from the Latin Maurus, and is cognate with the English word "Moor".

== Meaning and usage ==
=== Definition ===
In the Polish language, 'Murzyn' means somebody with black skin (a proper noun, uppercase spelling). The lowercase word ('murzyn', a common noun) has several metaphoric and informal meanings.

Murzyn (feminine form: Murzynka, diminutive: Murzynek) can be translated into English as "black man". The standard nominative plural is Murzyni, which is using the "personal masculine" suffix, while the impersonal suffix (that is: Murzyny) is pejorative.

=== Scholarly discourse ===
The word "Murzyn" is sometimes translated as either "black" or, more controversially, "Negro". With regards to the English word "Negro", however, the socio-cultural roots of each word are significantly different in the corresponding cultures. In the opinion of linguist Marek Łaziński, it has also been associated with Shakespeare's 'noble' Othello, usually called a "moor" in English. Sociologist Antonina Kloskowska, writing in 1996 in "Race", ethnicity and nation: international perspectives on social conflict, says the word Murzyn "does not carry pejorative connotations. However, in 2006 philologist Grażyna Zarzycka said that the word "'Murzyn', which to many Poles, including academics, is not offensive, is seen by some black people as discriminatory and derogatory."

Łaziński, writing in the language advice column of the Polish dictionary in 2008, suggested that in cases where an individual may perceive Murzyn to be offensive, geographic or national designations should be used. According to Łaziński the word Murzyn in Polish is sometimes perceived as offensive, though many Poles would defend its use. In comparison, a direct translation of the English word "black", "czarny", does not seem better to him since it often carries negative connotations in Polish, though he feels it may eventually replace Murzyn due to the influence of foreign languages on Polish. Philosopher Marcin Miłkowski wrote in 2012 that the word Murzyn, "previously considered neutral, is now all but banned in newspapers".

In August 2020 Łaziński published an opinion about the usage of the word, at the website of the Polish Language Council. According to Łaziński, the word had little negative association through the 1980s and into the 1990s; but as the Polish language evolved, the word became less and less common and its associations became more and more pejorative. In his new opinion, Łaziński has argued against its modern and public use and recommended that the word "Murzyn" not be used other than in historical quotations. In early March 2021, on the 55th plenary session of the Polish Language Council, Łaziński's opinion was unanimously voted as official opinion of the council. The Council opinion is a recommendation, it does not have legal binding, yet this was unique and first time recognition of the archaic and pejorative meaning by a high expert body.

=== Public discourse ===
Polish writer Dawid Juraszek in 2009 noted that comparing Polish "Murzyn" to English "Negro" without taking into account the word's neutral origins and non-racist historical background has caused some controversy over the word in recent years.

Poland's first black Member of Parliament, John Godson, said in 2011 that the word was not offensive and that he was proud to be called a Murzyn. He also said he saw no problem in using the terms "Murzyn", "ciemnoskóry" ["dark-skin"], "Afrykańczyk" ["African man"], or "Afropolak" ["Afro-Pole"]. Later however, in 2020, he tweeted "The word has evolved. If the people in question do not wish to be called "murzyn" - please do not call them that". Back in 2011, Mamadou Diouf, a Polish-Senegalese musician and representative of the Committee for the African Community (Komitet Społeczności Afrykańskiej), criticised Godson for his use of the word.

Polish-Kenyan writer and activist James Omolo in his 2018 book Strangers at the Gate. Black Poland argues that regardless the neutrality of the term "Murzyn", in the perception of Poles it is associated with inferiority. Among other usage examples, he cites a 2014 scandal with foreign minister Radoslaw Sikorski, who reportedly said that Polish mentality suffers from "Murzyńskość" ["Murzynness"], adding "The problem in Poland is that we have very shallow pride and low self-esteem". A black Polish MP, Killion Munyama, used the expression sto lat za Murzynami ["100 years behind the Murzyns"] while speaking to Godson about the status of LGBT issues in Poland, characterising it as behind the times.

On the other hand, black Polish journalist Brian Scott considers the word Murzyn to be positive and calls himself "pierwszy Murzyn Rzeczypospolitej" ("First Murzyn of Republic of Poland"), which is also the title of his autobiographical book published in 2016.

=== In language ===
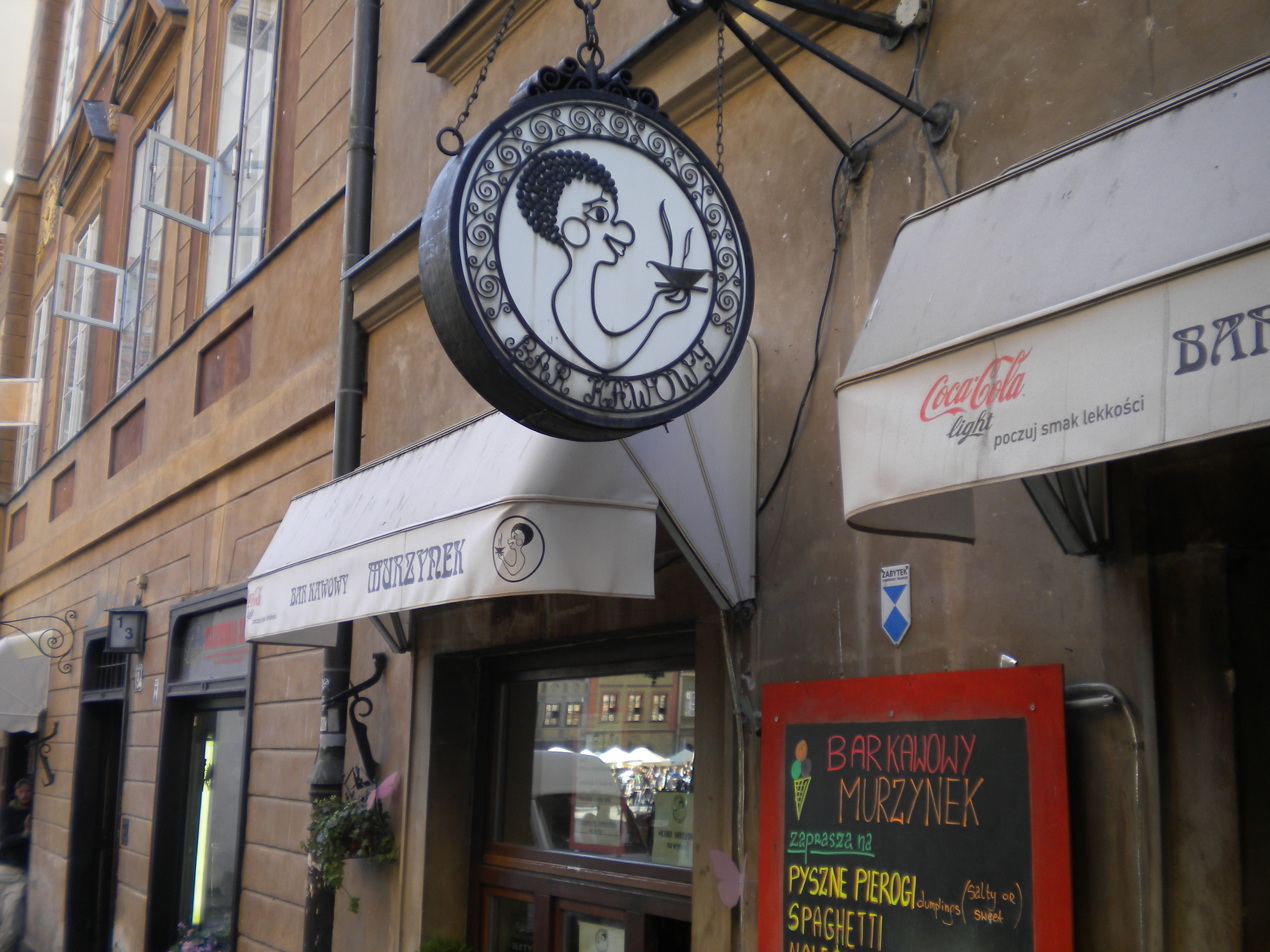
Cafe 'Murzynek' in Warsaw

A saying used in Poland, Murzyn zrobił swoje, Murzyn może odejść, is a quote from the 1783 play Fiesco by German writer Friedrich Schiller (translated from the German as "The Moor has done his duty, the Moor can go"). The meaning of this phrase is: "once you've served your purpose, you're no longer needed".

The expression "sto lat za murzynami" ("a hundred years behind the Africans", in reference to a considerable lagging in some area of progress) is pejorative with respect to the African people, suggesting they are backward, and being behind them is insulting.

The lowercase word ('murzyn', a common noun) may mean:

1. (informally) Somebody anonymously doing work for somebody else. The English word "ghostwriter" can be translated informally in Polish as literacki murzyn, in this case a "literary Negro".
2. (informally) Somebody with a dark brown tan;
3. (informally) A hard working person forced to do hard labour.

A murzynek can also mean a popular type of chocolate cake, or a portion of strong coffee.

Cycki Murzynki ("Murzynka's tits") is a cake made of biscuit and chocolate.

A murzyn polski ("Polish murzyn") is a variety of black-billed pigeon.

A murzynka is also a type of strawberry with small, dark red fruit.

Muřin (murzyn, murzin; "murzin wielkanocny", or "Easter murzin") is another term for szołdra, a Silesian easter bread.

=== In Polish culture ===
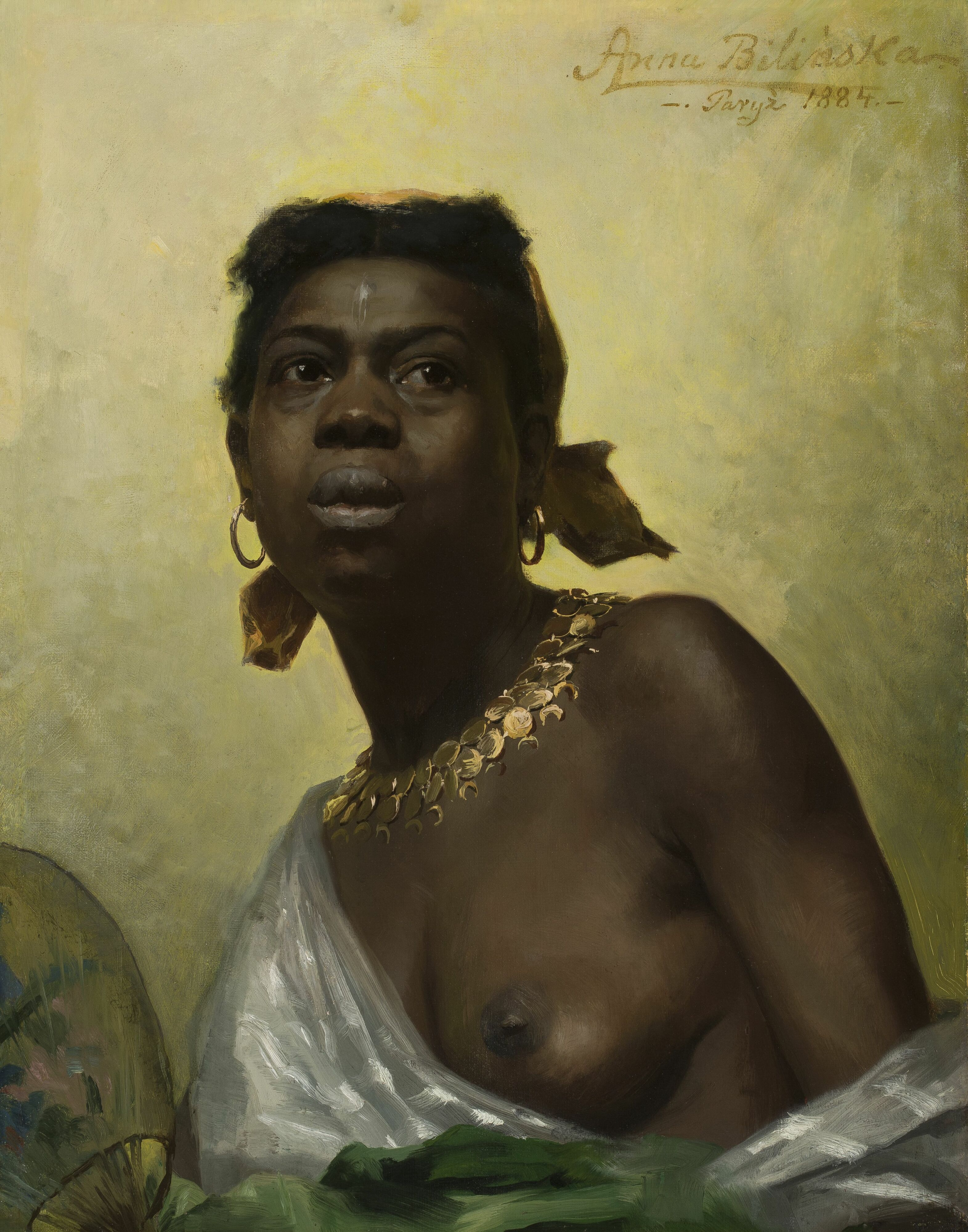
A Negress (Murzynka) by Anna Bilińska-Bohdanowicz, 1884

A famous children's poem "Murzynek Bambo" has been criticized for imprinting a stereotypical image of an African child. Others argue that the poem should be seen in the context of its time, and that commentators should not go overboard in analysing it.

In 1939 Leonard Buczkowski directed the film Biały Murzyn (White Murzyn).

In 2014 a brand of Polish margarine, "Palma", which portrays a cartoon-drawing of a black person (first launched in 1972) was rebranded as "Palma z Murzynkiem". The usage of this term attracted similar criticism. The use of the word "Murzynek" (a diminutive of Murzyn) was criticized by Polish-Senegalese Mamadou Diouf, who called for a boycott. Polish linguist Jerzy Bralczyk noted that the word "Murzyn" is not pejorative, but diminutives could be seen as such, if only because they are diminutives. The margarine producer, Bielmar, denied any racist views, and said that the logo has been a distinctive part of the product for decades. It believed that abolishing it would result in a loss of the company's strongest brand, and the current rebranding with the diminutive (from "Palma" to "Palma z Murzynkiem") is simply a response to the common nickname of the product as used by the customers.

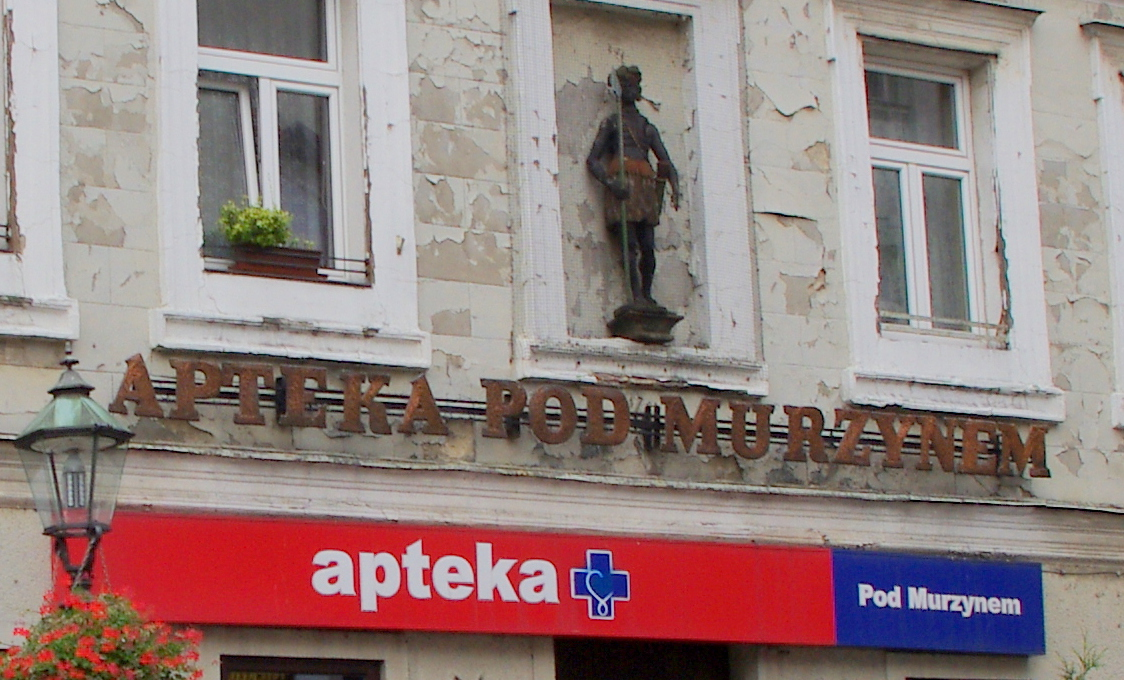
A drugstore "Under the Murzyn"

Pod Murzynami ("Under the Murzyns") is a not uncommon name for chemist's shops or tenement buildings in Poland. Often an image of a black person accompanies the name.

A Polish general of English-African descent, Władysław Franciszek Jabłonowski (1769–1802), was nicknamed "Murzynek" as a child.

== See also ==
- Murzynowo (disambiguation)
