= Mufian language =

Arapesh language of Papua New Guinea

Mufian
- Southern Arapesh
- Native to: Papua New Guinea
- Region: Bumbita-Muhian Rural LLG, East Sepik Province (36 villages)
- Native speakers: (11,000 cited 1998)
- Language family: Torricelli: Arapesh; Mufian

Language codes
- ISO 639-3: aoj
- Glottolog: mufi1238
- ELP: Mufian

Mufian (Muhian, Muhiang), or Southern Arapesh, is an Arapesh language (Torricelli) of Papua New Guinea. Dialects are Supari, Balif, Filifita (Ilahita), Iwam-Nagalemb, Nagipaem; Filifita speakers are half the population, at 6,000 in 1999. It is spoken in 36 villages, most of which are located within Bumbita-Muhian Rural LLG, East Sepik Province. It is also spoken in Supari ward of Albiges-Mablep Rural LLG.

== Phonology ==
Consonant Phonemes of Mufian
		Labial	Alveolar	Velar		Glottal	
		Labial	Alveolar	plain	labialized	plain	labialized
Nasal		m	n				
Stop	voiceless	p	t	k	kʷ	ʔ	ʔʷ
Stop	voiced	b	d	ɡ	ɡʷ		
Fricative		f	s			h	
Approximant		w	l				

Mufian pronunciation: [/ʔʷ/] is a coarticulated glottal stop with lip rounding that occurs only in final word positions.

Vowel Phonemes of Mufian
	Front	Central	Back
High	i		u
Mid	e	ə	o
Low	æ		ɑ

== Pronouns ==
Southern Arapesh pronouns are:

	sg	pl
1incl		Mufian pronunciation: [apə]
1excl	Mufian pronunciation: [aeʔ]	Mufian pronunciation: [afə]
2	Mufian pronunciation: [inəʔ]	Mufian pronunciation: [ipə]
3m	Mufian pronunciation: [ənən]	Mufian pronunciation: [əmom]
3f	Mufian pronunciation: [əkoʔʷ]	Mufian pronunciation: [aowou]

== Noun classes ==
There are 17 classes for count nouns in Mufian, plus two extra classes, i.e. proper names and place names. Noun classes are expressed in noun suffixes, adjective suffixes, and verb prefixes.

Although Southern Arapesh has more than a dozen noun classes, only four noun classes are determined by semantics, while the other noun classes are determined phonologically using the final root segment (a feature typical of the Lower Sepik languages). The four semantically determined noun classes are:

- class 16: male human referents
- class 8: female human referents
- class 5: human referents of unspecified sex (likely diminutive, since children are also included)
- class 6: human referents of unspecified sex

The membership of the other twelve classes is determined phonologically, by the final segment of the root, as in the Lower Sepik languages.

Some examples of Mufian noun classes from Alungum (1978):

Class	Form (sg.)	Form (pl.)	Gloss	Sg. Noun Suffix	Sg. Adjective Suffix	Sg. Verb Prefix	Pl. Noun Suffix	Pl. Adjective Suffix	Pl. Verb Prefix
Class 1	bol	bongof	pig	-l	-li	l-	-ngof	-ngufi	f-
Class 2	éngel	angof	name	-ngél	-ngili	g-	-ngof	-ngufi	f-
Class 3	nalof	nalelef	tooth	-f	-fi	f-	-lef	-lefi	f-
Class 4	lowaf	lu'ongof	clothes	-f	-fi	f-	-nguf	-fi	f-
Class 5	batéwin	batéwis	child	-n	-ni	n-	-s	-si	s-
Class 6	alupini	alupisi	friend	-ni	-ni	n-	-si	-si	s-
Class 7	nombat	nombangw	dog	-t, -ta	-tei	t-	-ngw	-ngwi	gw-
Class 8	nemata'w	nematawa	woman	-'w	-kwi	kw-	-wa	-wei	w-
Class 9	nam	naep	eye	-m	-mi	m-	-p	-pi	p-
Class 10	lawang	lawah	tree	-g, -ga	-gwei	g-	-h	-ngéhi	h-
Class 11	bemb	bembeh	betel nut	-b	-mbi	b-	-h	-mbihi	h-
Class 12	nongwatop	nongwatoh	knife	-p	-pi	p-	-h	-hi	h-
Class 13	wambel	walemb	village	-mbel	-mbili	b-	-lemb	-lembi	b-
Class 14	mai'una	ma'unamb	pigeon	-a	-ni	n-	-amb	-mbi	b-
Class 15	usin	usimb	crested pigeon	-n	-ni	n-	-b	-mbi	b-
Class 16	aman	amam	man	-n	-nei	n-	-m	-mi	m-
Class 17	kos	kos	course	-s	-si	s-	-s	-si	s-

There are a few irregularities in these noun classes.
