= Abuʼ Arapesh language =

Arapesh language of Papua New Guinea

Abu'
- Ua
- Native to: Papua New Guinea
- Region: East Sepik Province: Albiges/Mablep Rural LLG, ward 8; Sandaun Province: East Aitape Rural LLG, wards 23, 24, 25
- Native speakers: (2,600 cited 2000 census)
- Language family: Torricelli: Arapesh; Abu'

Language codes
- ISO 639-3: aah
- Glottolog: abua1245
- ELP: Abu'

Abuʼ, also known as Ua (meaning 'no'), is an Arapesh language (Torricelli family) of Papua New Guinea. It is dying, as speakers are shifting to Tok Pisin.

Otto Nekitel, a first language speaker of Abu' Arapesh, was awarded a PhD from the ANU in 1986 for his thesis Sociolinguistic aspects of Abu, becoming the first Papua New Guinean to receive a doctorate in linguistics.

Abuʼ is spoken in:

- East Sepik Province: Albiges/Mablep Rural LLG, ward 8 (Wamsak / Amom) (3.514525°S 142.903064°E)
- Sandaun Province: East Aitape Rural LLG, wards 23, 24, 25 (respectively: Wamsis (3.467489°S 142.960415°E), Balup (3.393568°S 142.96348°E), Matapau (3.361089°S 143.024274°E))
