= Bumbita language =

Arapesh language of Papua New Guinea

Bumbita
- Native to: Papua New Guinea
- Region: Bumbita-Muhian Rural LLG, East Sepik Province (13 villages)
- Ethnicity: 8,700
- Native speakers: 4,300 (2003)
- Language family: Torricelli: Arapesh; Bumbita

Language codes
- ISO 639-3: aon
- Glottolog: bumb1241
- ELP: Bumbita
- Bumbita is classified as Vulnerable by the UNESCO Atlas of the World's Languages in Danger.

Bumbita (But Arapesh) is an Arapesh language (Torricelli) of Papua New Guinea spoken mainly by older adults, unlike other Arapesh languages. The dialects of the language are Bonahoi, Urita, Timingir, Weril, Werir. It is spoken in 13 villages of Bumbita-Muhian Rural LLG, East Sepik Province.

== Dialects ==
The dialects are:

- Bonahoi dialect: spoken in Bonohol ward (3.61353°S 142.860922°E)
- Urita dialect: spoken in Urita ward (3.635093°S 142.87486°E)
- Timingir dialect: spoken in Timigir ward (3.645181°S 142.870859°E)
- Weril dialect
- Werir dialect
