= Władysław Franciszek Jabłonowski =

Afro-Polish army officer (1769–1802)

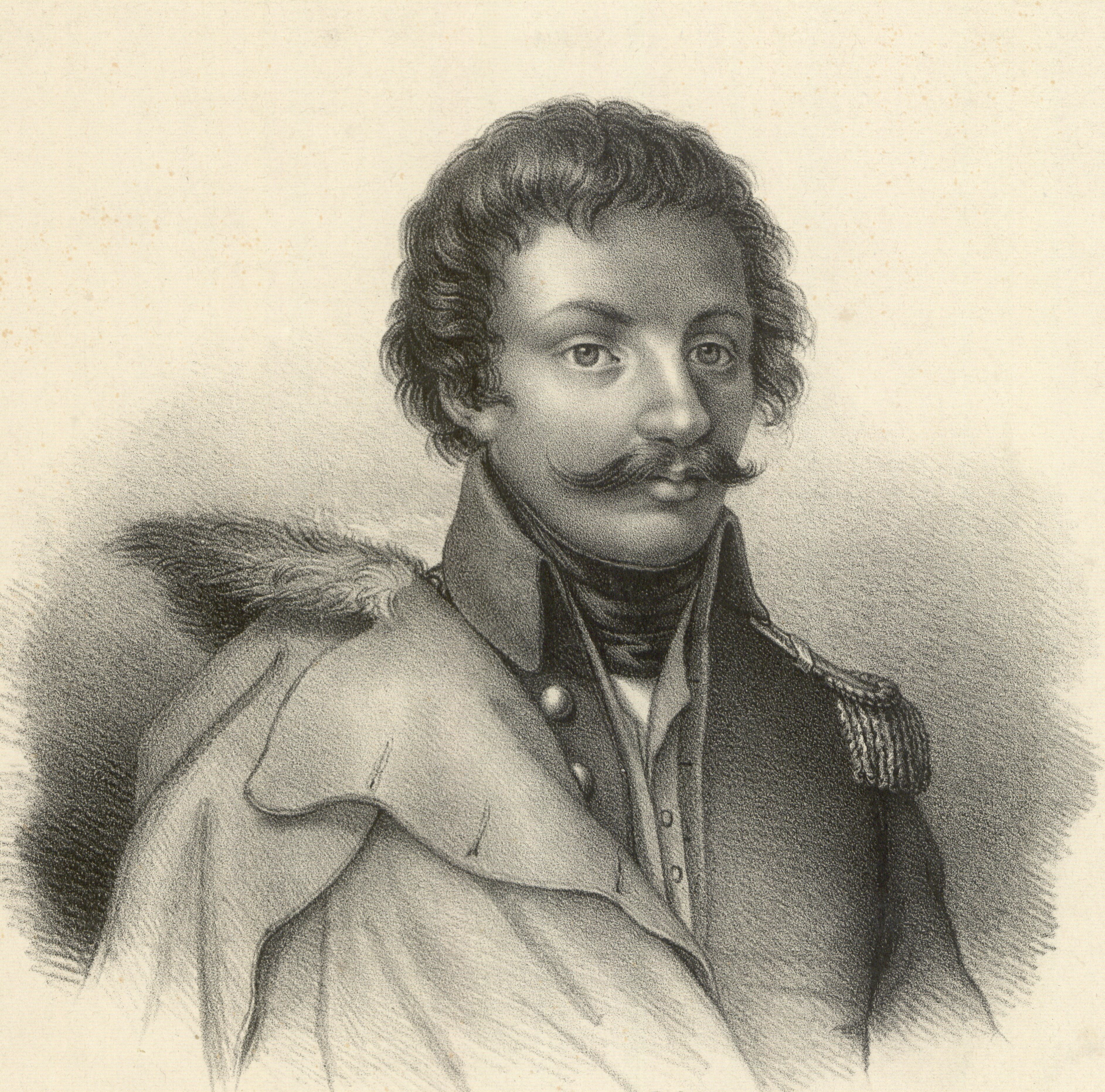
- 1841–1846 portrait
- Born: 25 October 1769; Gdańsk, Poland
- Died: 29 September 1802 (aged 32); Jérémie, Saint-Domingue
- Military career
- Allegiance: Kingdom of France; Polish-Lithuanian Commonwealth; French First Empire
- Branch: French Royal Army; French Revolutionary Army
- Service years: 1786–1802
- Rank: Second lieutenant (French Royal Army); Brigade general (French Revolutionary Army)
- Nickname: Murzynek
- Units: Royal German Cavalry Regiment
- Conflicts: Kościuszko Uprising; Warsaw Uprising (1794); Battle of Szczekociny; Battle of Maciejowice; Battle of Praga; Haitian Revolution; Saint-Domingue expedition †

Brigadier-General Władysław Franciszek Jabłonowski (25 October 1769 – 29 September 1802) was a mixed black-Polish military officer who served in the French Revolutionary Wars. He is the first known Polish general of African descent.

After joining the French army, he died of yellow fever in Saint-Domingue in 1802, having been sent there as part of the Saint-Domingue expedition, which saw Polish troops fighting alongside the French to restore slavery in the colony.

After the French and Polish suffered heavy losses from yellow fever and the unfamiliar asymmetrical warfare of their enemies, they withdrew their surviving forces from Saint-Domingue, with some Polish soldiers defecting to the Haitian revolutionaries.

== Early life ==
Władysław Franciszek Jabłonowski was born on 25 October 1769 in Gdańsk, Poland. His mother was Princess Maria Franciszka Dealire, a British woman who had married into the Polish nobility, and his father was an unknown Black footman; the conception had occurred while Maria was visiting Paris.

Dealire's husband, a Crown Army officer named Konstanty Aleksander Jabłonowski who was also known to engage in extramarital affairs, was "blithely unperturbed" when it became apparent the newborn was not his son. Possibly due to Konstanty's desire for a male heir, he accepted the child as his son, naming him Władysław Franciszek Jabłonowski. During the boy's early childhood, he was nicknamed "Murzynek", a common Polish term for Black people.

Jabłonowski began studying at Paris' École Militaire on 25 February 1783. During one schoolyear, his classmates included Napoleon and Louis-Nicolas Davout; the former subjected Jabłonowski to racist abuse, to which he responded that it was "[better] to be a Negro with a white heart than a white man with a black heart." Jabłonowski's relationship with Davout was much better, and the two became friends.

On graduating 20 February 1786, Jabłonowski was commissioned into the French Royal Army's Royal German Cavalry Regiment in the rank of second lieutenant. However, he lost the commission after going on an extended stay in Poland. When the French Revolution began in 1789, he supported it in Paris and survived the Reign of Terror.

== Military career ==
In 1794 Jabłonowski fought in Tadeusz Kościuszko's uprising against Tsarist Russia. He participated in battles of Szczekociny, Warsaw, Maciejowice, and at Praga. A member of the Polish insurrectionist group Centralizacja Lwowska,[pl] he was sent to the Ottoman Empire to gain the support of the Ottoman and French governments for the creation a Polish army to antagonize Russia. Another opportunity for this later appeared with the French fighting in Italy.

He was appointed brigade chief in the French army on 4 January 1798. In 1799, he was under the command of General Jan Henryk Dąbrowski. In 1799 he was made General of Brigade of the Polish legions (the Dąbrowski Legion). He became provisional brigade general in the Army of Italy on 20 May 1800 after being nominated by General André Massena. However, his French superiors would not approve this rank. He distinguished himself in the battle of Bosco and Pasturana and commanded a legion in the Alps.

On 24 July 1801, he was again nominated to the rank of brigade general in the Polish legions by General Joachim Murat, an appointment that was confirmed on 21 December 1801 by the First Consul. In May 1801, he was appointed as the commander of the Danube Legion, which was renamed the 3rd Polish Half-Brigade on 21 December. He was subsequently given the option of serving in Louisiana or Saint-Domingue. He was sent at his own request to Saint-Domingue in May 1802 along with the 3rd Polish Half-Brigade and accompanied by his common-law wife Anne Penot. There he fought against Black rebels who had revolted against French rule in mid-1802. Jabłonowski died from yellow fever on 29 September 1802 in Jérémie.

The disease caused many deaths among French-led forces in the colony, killing more than those who died because of warfare. Approximately 400 men of the 3rd Polish Half-Brigade (renamed the 113th Line Infantry Half-Brigade on 2 September), out of 5,280 men of the unit, deserted the French and joined the rebels. They settled in what became Haiti, where their descendants are known as Polish Haitians.

== In Polish culture ==
Jabłonowski is mentioned in Adam Mickiewicz's epic poem Pan Tadeusz, where a veteran of the Polish Legions recounts having seen

how Jabłonowski had reached the land where the pepper grows

and where sugar is produced, and where in eternal spring bloom fragrant woods: with the [L]egion of the Danube there

the Polish general smites the Negroes [Murzyns] but sighs for his native soil

== See also ==
- Saint-Domingue expedition
