= John Godson =

Polish-Nigerian politician and university teacher

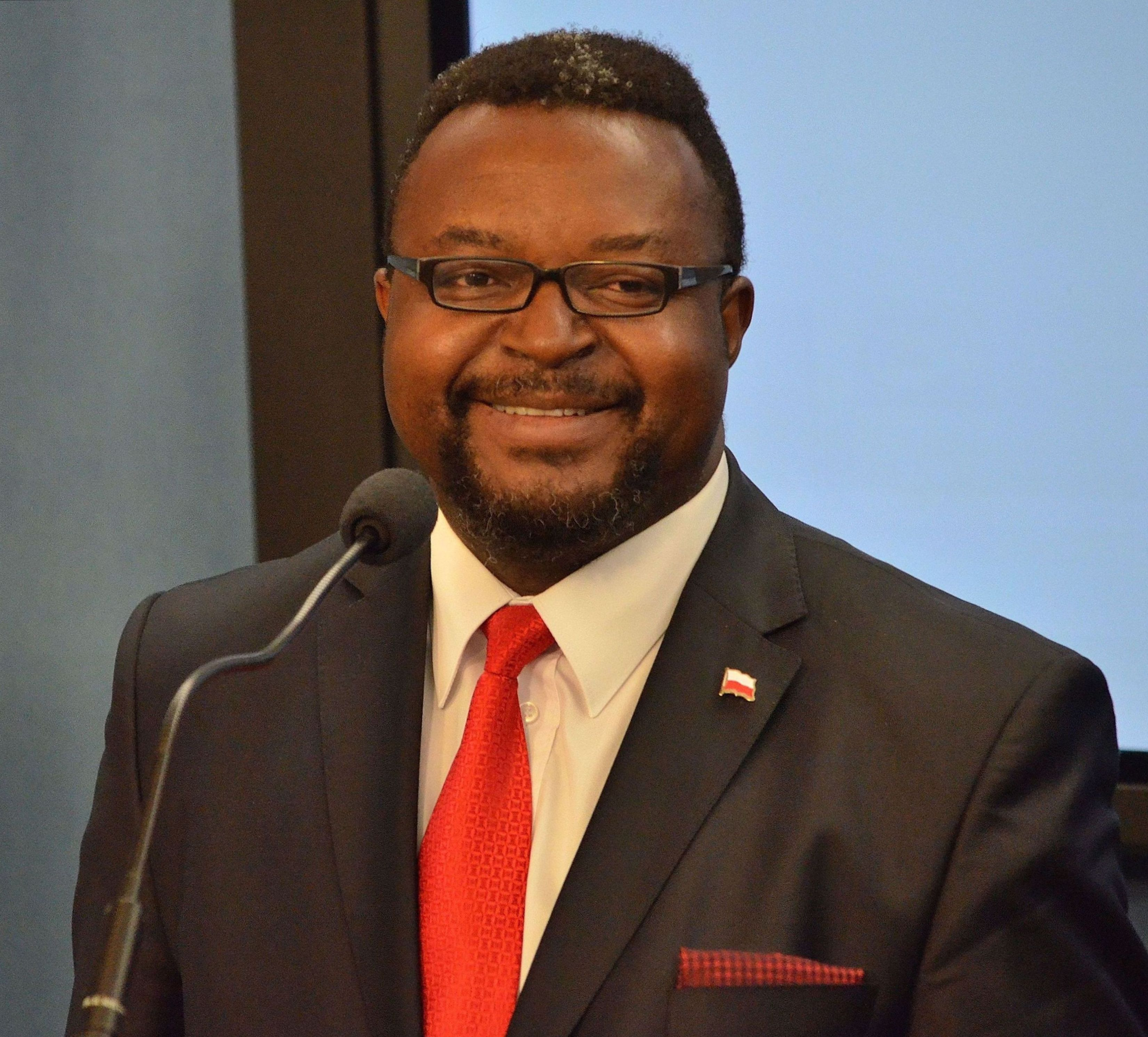

Member of the Sejm
- In office 14 December 2010 – 25 October 2015
- Constituency: 9 – Łódź

Personal details
- Born: 25 November 1970 (age 55) Umuahia, Nigeria
- Party: Polish People's Party (2015-present)
- Other political affiliations: African Democratic Congress (2022-2023); Poland Together (2013-2014); Civic Platform (Until 2013)

John Abraham Godson (né Godson Chikama Onyekwere; born 25 November 1970) is a Polish-Nigerian politician, a university teacher and a former Charismatic minister. He served as a member of the Sejm between 2010 and 2015, most recently as a member of the PSL.

== Biography ==
John Godson (birthname Godson Chikama Onyekwere) was born in Nigeria to an Igbo family from Umuahia, Abia State. He moved to Poland in 1993, and in 2001 became a Polish citizen. In 2008, he became a member of the Łódź City Council. In 2007, he unsuccessfully ran in the Polish parliamentary election. In 2010, he was re-elected for the City Council with 4736 votes, the second best result out of almost 800 candidates. As former MP Hanna Zdanowska was elected Mayor of Łódź in the same election, Godson replaced her as a member of the Sejm. He was sworn in on 14 December 2010. The "Obama bump" is considered by many the reason for the many votes he received during the Sejm campaign. His supporters were known to cheer "Wiwat! Wiwat polski Obama!" ("Long live the Polish Obama!"). John Godson was re-elected as a member of the Polish parliament on 9 October 2011 with 29,832 votes

Godson often emphasizes the importance of education and he is the holder of numerous academic degrees. He has a Bachelor of Science degree in agronomy from Abia State University in Nigeria (1987–92). He also holds master's degrees in Human Resource Management and Development from Trinity College and Seminary in Newburgh, Indiana (2000–03) and International relations from the Łódź Academy of International Studies (2006–08). He finished two doctorate studies at the University of Warsaw (Political Science, 2011) and University of Łódź (Management, 2012). He also holds a joint MBA/MSPC (Master of Business Administration/Master of Science in Professional Communication) run by Clark University and the Łódź Academy of Management.

He was a senior lecturer at the Technical University of Szczecin (1993–97) and at Adam Mickiewicz University, Poznań. He is a guest lecturer in various institutions of higher learning in Poland and abroad. He is the founder of GODSON GROUP- a conglomerate of five companies and four foundations including the African Institute in Poland and John Godson Foundation. The New African magazine named him as being amongst 100 of the most influential people in Africa in 2015. On 14 November 2016, The Polish Minister of Foreign Affairs decorated him with Bene Merito honorary distinction for promoting Polish-Africa relations.

In February 2021, he announced his intention to run for President of Nigeria in the 2023 Nigerian general election.

He is contested for a senatorial position under the platform of the African Democratic Congress in Abia Central in 2023.

== Religious views ==
Godson is a former minister of Polish Charismatic "Church of God in Christ". He is known for his strong religious beliefs. He calls himself "[...]a slave of Jesus Christ, called to be an apostle, separated unto the Gospel of God."

== Views on racism in Poland ==
Godson has stated that there is "no racism" in Poland. Talking to Biuletyn Migracyjny, he said: "I've always said and still underline, that in my opinion there is no racism in Poland. There is, however, something that I call low inter-cultural competences. And this can be changed by more contact between different cultures and societal groups. No law can change the mentality of people".

Godson has said that the word "Murzyn", the Polish word most commonly used to refer to black people, is not offensive and that he is proud to be called a 'Murzyn'. Mamadou Diouf, a black Polish musician and representative of the Committee for the African Community (Komitet Społeczności Afrykańskiej), has criticised Godson for his use of the word, saying that it has only had "negative connotations" and that Godson does not know the origin of the word.
