= Šoldra =

Type of bread

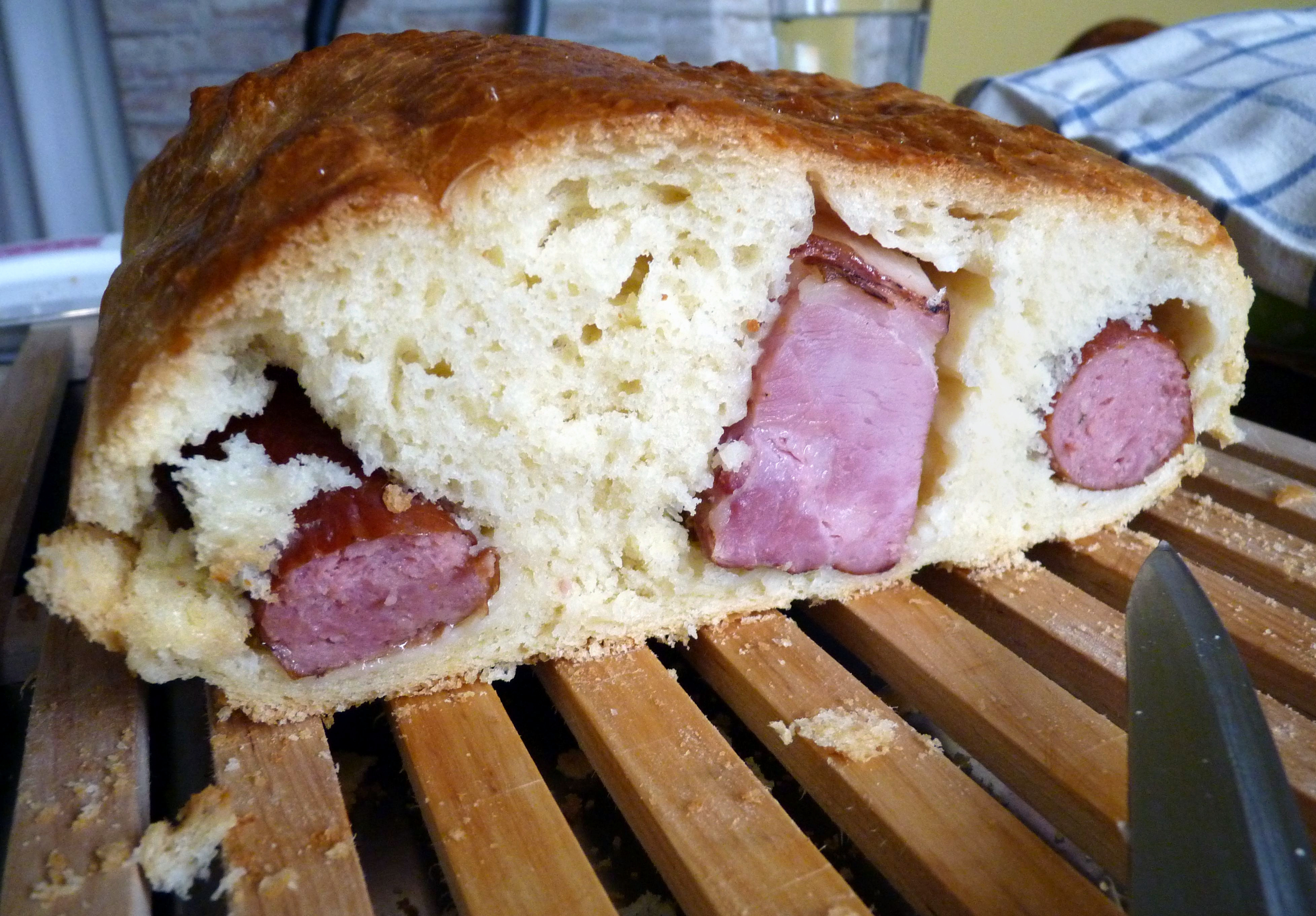
- Place of origin: Poland, Germany, Czech Republic
- Region or state: Silesia
- Main ingredients: Almond meal, sausage
- Similar dishes: Folar

Šoldra, Šoldr (Polish: szołdra, szołdr) is a traditional Silesian cuisine Easter bread. It is also known as muřin (Polish: murzyn, murzin). It is traditionally prepared and eaten on Easter Sunday.

Šoldra/szołdra is an archaic Polish term for ham and murzyn/muřin literally means "black person", and refers to blackening of the dish.

The dough is stuffed with sausage varieties such as smoked meat sausage, white wine sausage, and ham/pork sausage. Almond meal is used.

== See also ==
- Folar, Portuguese Easter bread sometimes stuffed with meat
- Easter foods
- List of stuffed dishes
