= Mamadou Diouf (musician) =

Senegalese musician and writer

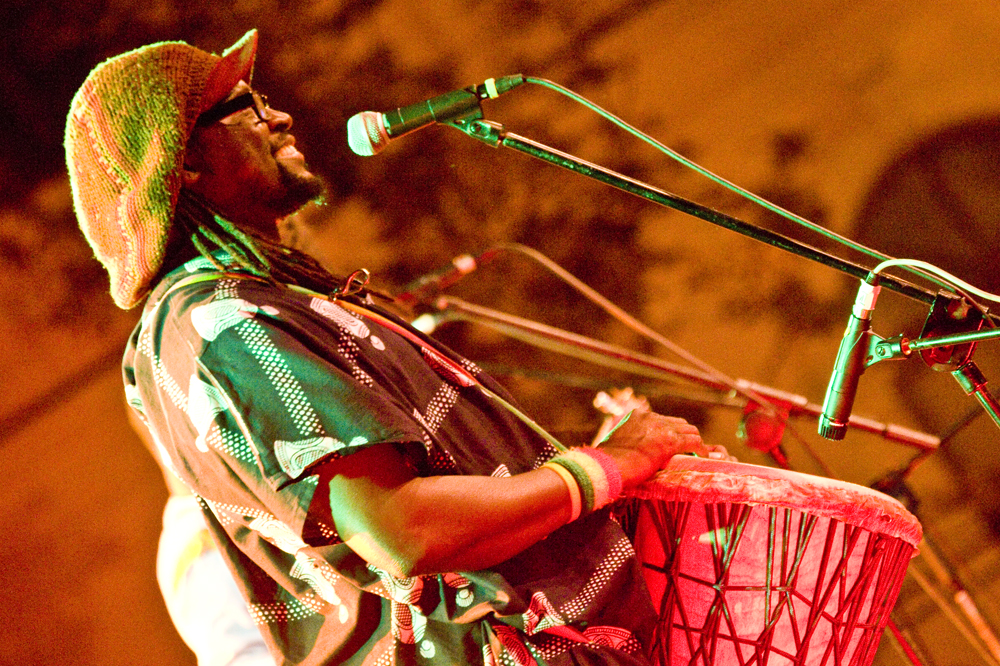
Diouf performing in Warsaw in 2011

Mamadou Diouf is a Senegalese musician and writer. Since 2007, he also holds Polish citizenship.

== Education ==
Diouf trained as a veterinarian. He first came to Poland in 1983 to study Polish on a language course in Łódź. He then moved to Warsaw, where he experienced racial abuse, including physical attacks "in broad daylight".

== Musical career ==
Diouf has released a number of albums and has collaborated with Anna Maria Jopek, Voo Voo and Zakopower.

== Writing ==
In 2011, Diouf published A Little Book about Racism ("Mała książka o rasizmie"). He has also frequently spoken out against racism in Poland and the use of the racial term murzyn ("moor"). He also co-authored with Stephano Sambali How to talk to Polish children about children from Africa ("Jak mówić polskim dzieciom o dzieciach z Afryki").

== Activism ==
In 2007, Diouf set up the "Africa Another Way Foundation" to increase "knowledge sharing and communication" regarding African issues in Poland.

Diouf has criticised Poland's first black Member of Parliament, John Godson, who has said that the word "murzyn" is not offensive and that he is proud to be called one. Diouf has said that the word has only had "negative connotations" (it is used in many pejorative phrases) and that Godson does not know the word's etymology.

Regarding racial comments said by prominent Polish figures, Diouf has said: "That's the problem in this country. I'm not even talking about racism, but there's no critique when someone says these things."

== Gallery ==
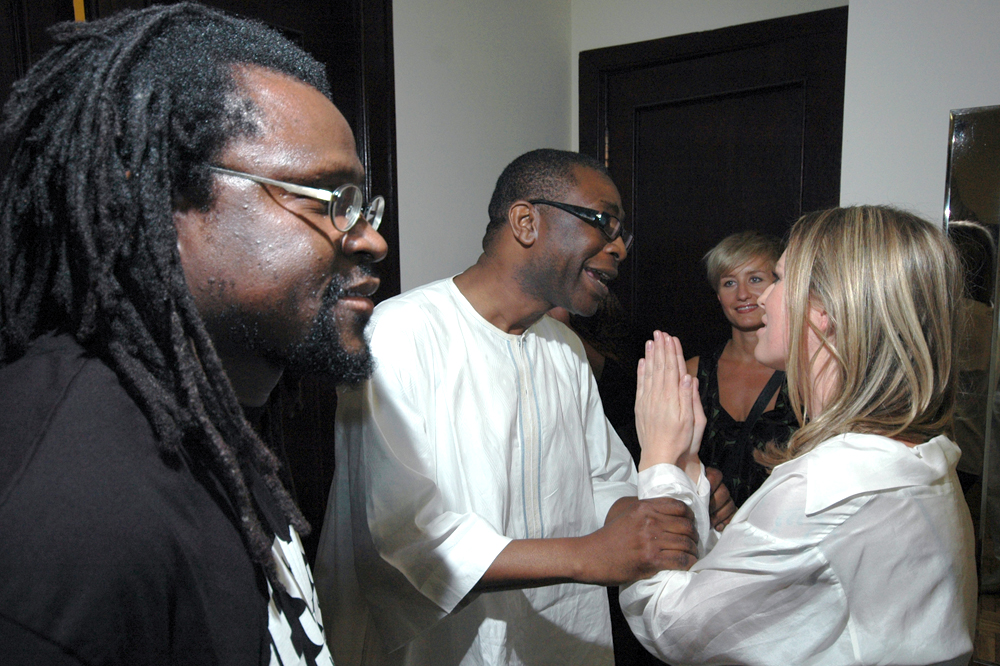
Mamadou Diouf (left) and Youssou N'Dour (center) with Anna-Maria Jopek.

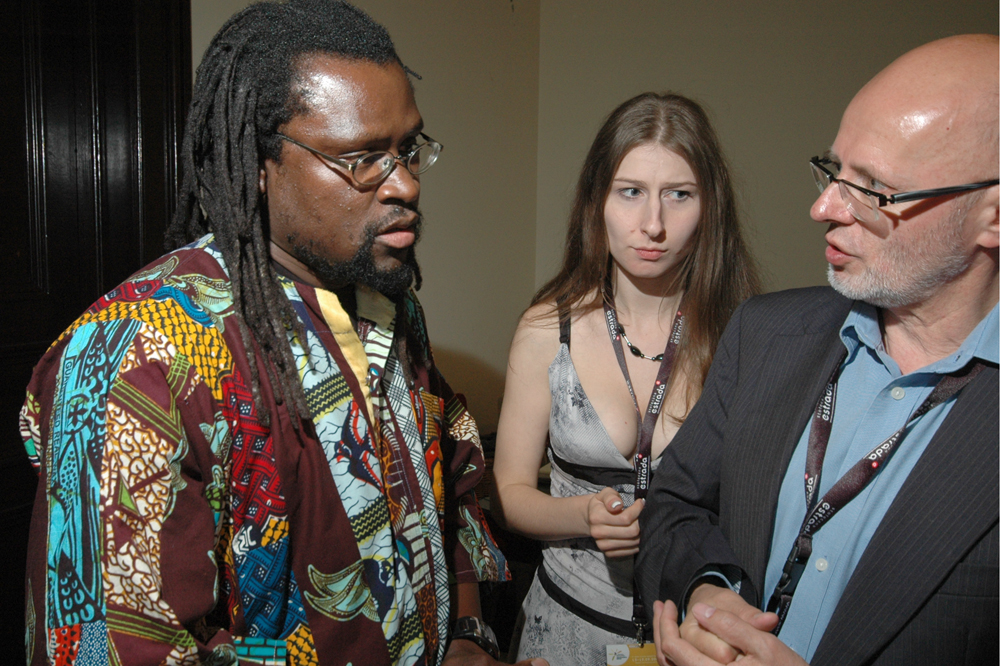
Mamadou with music journalist Marek Garztecki during the Cross Culture Festival in Warsaw - September 2009.

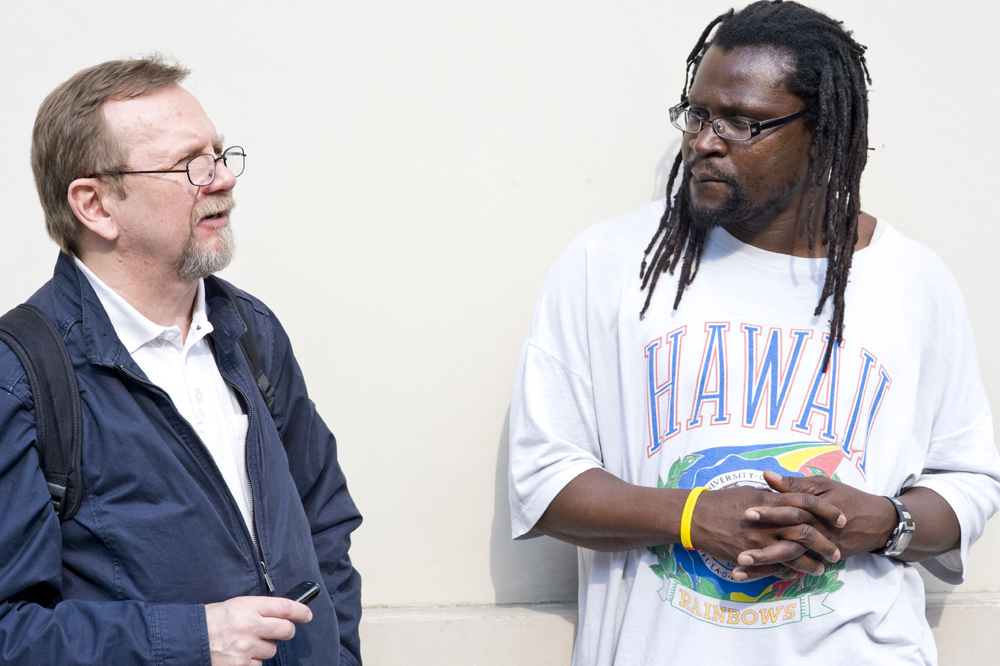
Mamadou in conversation with radio journalist Włodzimierz Kleszcz in Warsaw, April 2011.

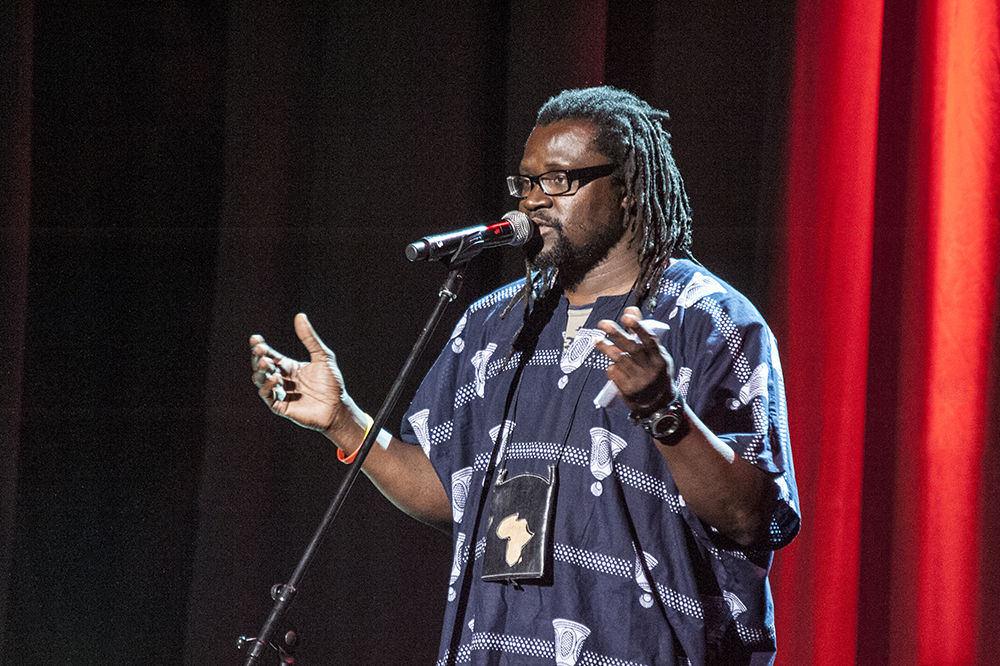
Announcing a concert at the 2011 Cross Culture Festival in Warsaw - September 2011.

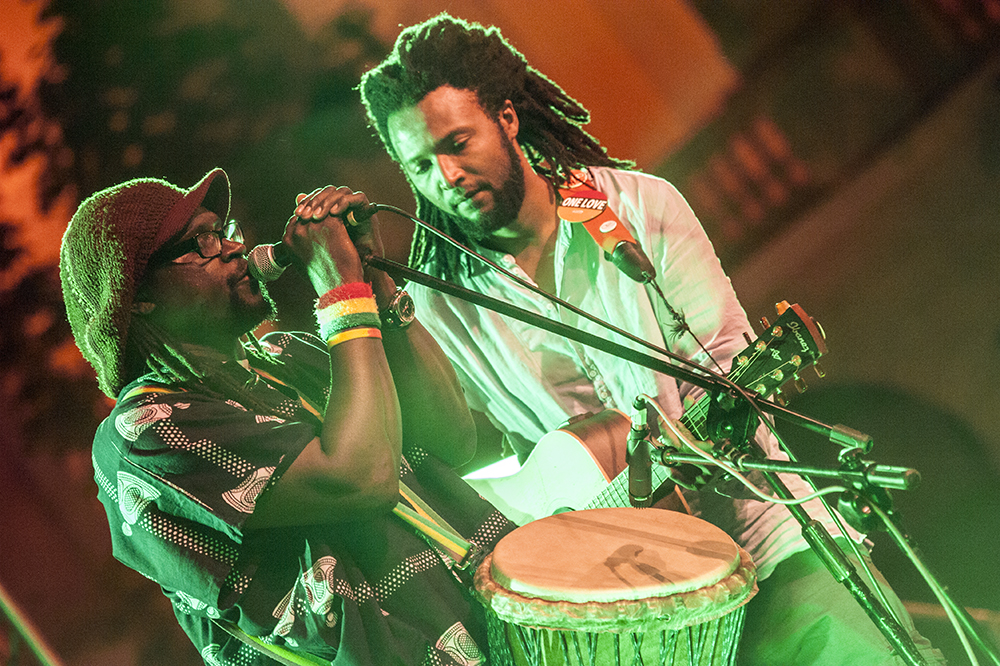
Mamadou Diouf and Pako Sarr on stage in Warsaw, Poland - August 2011.
