= Albiges/Mablep Rural LLG =

Local-level government in Papua New Guinea

- Country: Papua New Guinea
- Province: East Sepik Province
- Time zone: UTC+10 (AEST)

Albiges/Mablep Rural LLG is a local-level government (LLG) of East Sepik Province, Papua New Guinea.

== Wards ==
- 01. Iwam
- 02. Jikinumbu
- 03. Kulunge
- 04. Bongiora
- 05. Apangai
- 06. Ami
- 07. Amahup
- 08. Wamsak / Amom (Abu’ Arapesh language speakers)
- 09. Supari
- 10. Gwoingwoin
- 11. Dahabiga
- 12. Kulelikum
- 13. Walahuta
- 14. Ningalimb
