= Murzynowo =

Murzynowo may refer to the following places:

- Murzynowo, Lubusz Voivodeship (west Poland)
- Murzynowo, Masovian Voivodeship (east-central Poland)
- Murzynowo, Pomeranian Voivodeship (north Poland)
