= Royal German Cavalry Regiment =

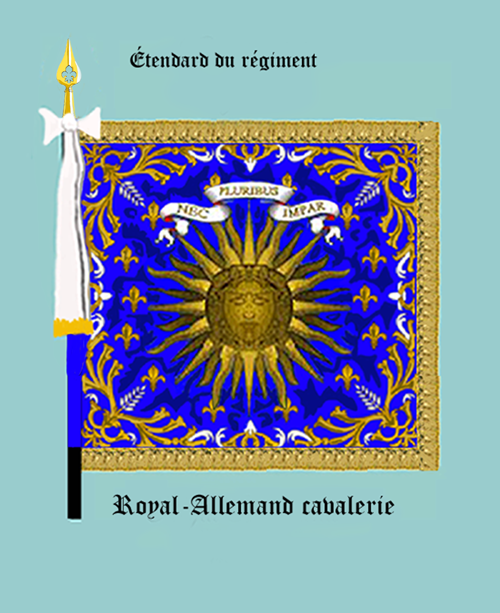
- The regimental flag
- Active: 1671–1792
- Country: France
- Branch: French Royal Army
- Type: Cavalry

The Royal German Cavalry Regiment was a cavalry regiment of the French Royal Army. Composed primarily of Germanophones from France and Germany, it was renamed the 15th Cavalry Regiment in 1791 and disbanded in 1792.

== Early history ==
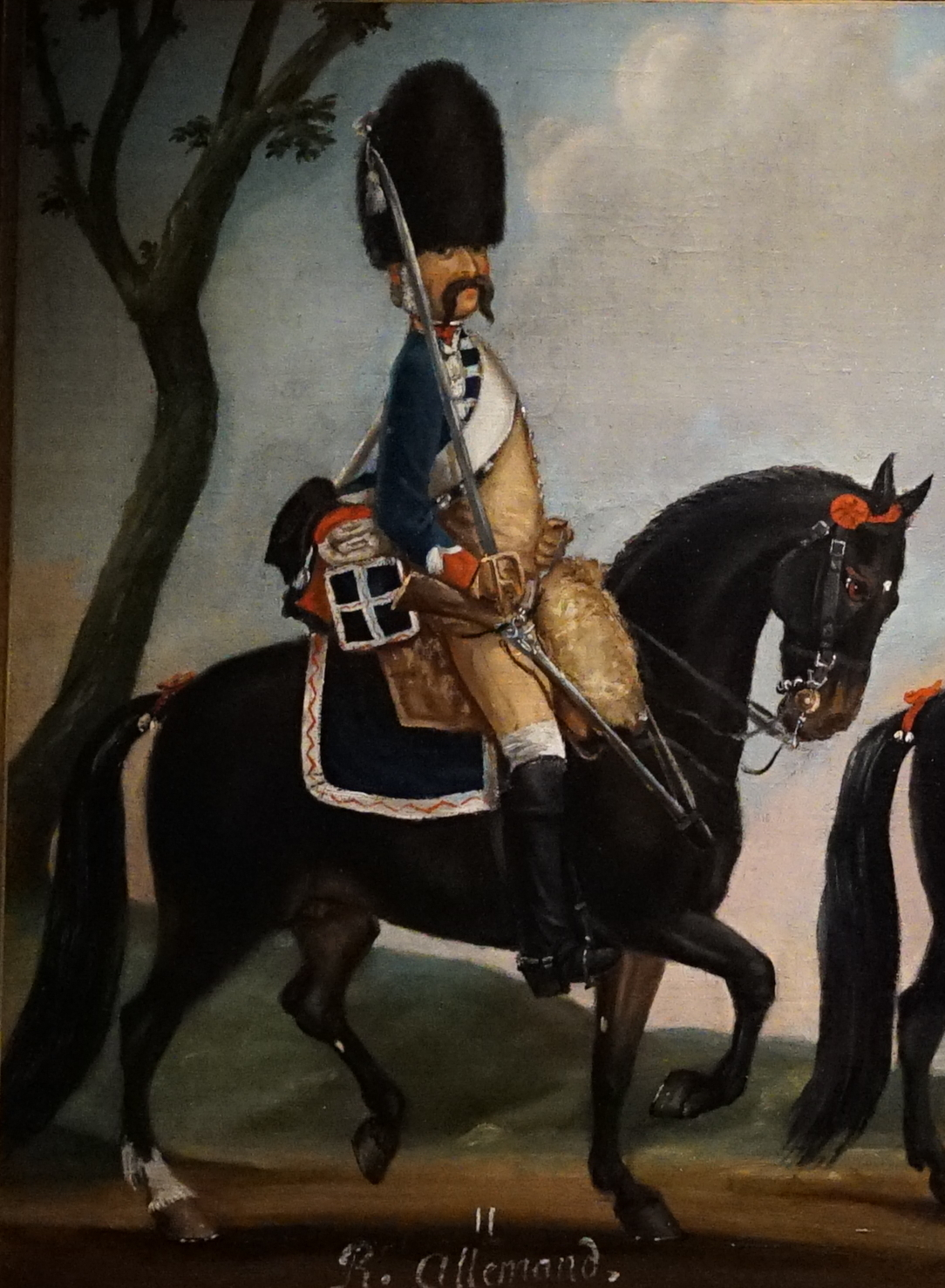
1779 portrait of a regimental soldier

Following its establishment under King Louis XIV in 1672, the Royal-Allemand saw extensive active service in Flanders and various German states during both the War of the Austrian Succession and the Seven Years' War.

== Role in French Revolution ==
In June 1789 the Royal-Allemand was one of the regiments of the Royal Army summoned to Paris to suppress the growing disturbances in the city, that preceded the outbreak of the French Revolution. About half of this force was made up of Swiss and German foreign troops, who were considered more dependable in a time of civil unrest than the native born rank and file of the French regular regiments.

While the Royal-Allemand was mainly recruited within the borders of France, its German speaking troopers proved willing to act against the Paris population when ordered. On 12 July 1789, a squadron of the regiment, under the command of Charles Eugene, charged a crowd of demonstrators in the Tuileries Garden killing one and injuring others. A detachment of the French Guards, who formed the permanent garrison of Paris and had strong local ties, then fired on the cavalrymen of the Royal-Allemand. The regiment was subsequently withdrawn from Paris and returned to its frontier garrison. While desertions from both French and foreign regiments were running at a high rate during the revolutionary disorders of 1789, the Royal-Allemand lost only three men during this period. In part this appears to have occurred because of the widespread hostility that developed towards this unit following its clashes with civilians in Paris on 12 July.

== Disbandment ==
In 1791 the bulk of the regiments of the French Army lost their historic titles and were renamed under a system of numbering. The Royal-Allemand became the "15e régiment de cavalerie" (15th Cavalry Regiment). After the overthrow of Louis XVI in August 1792, part of the regiment, led by its officers, defected and took service with the army of royalist emigres being raised by the Prince of Condé at Coblenz. The remnants of the Royal-Allemand fought in the Battle of Aldenhoven beside the Austrian Army, before finally being disbanded.

== Notable members of the regiment ==
General Jabłonowski served as a lieutenant in the regiment before losing his commission after failing to return from leave.

== Uniforms ==
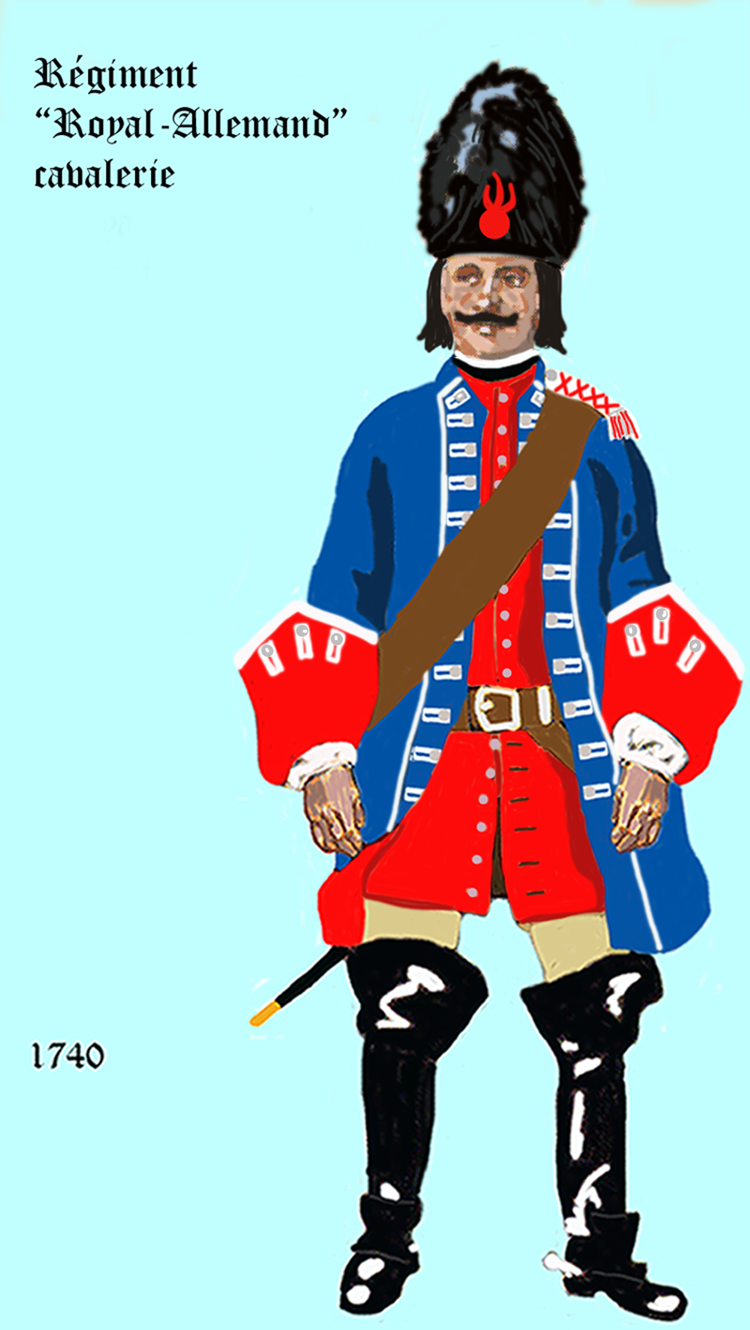
Régiment Royal-Allemand cavalerie 1740 - 1757

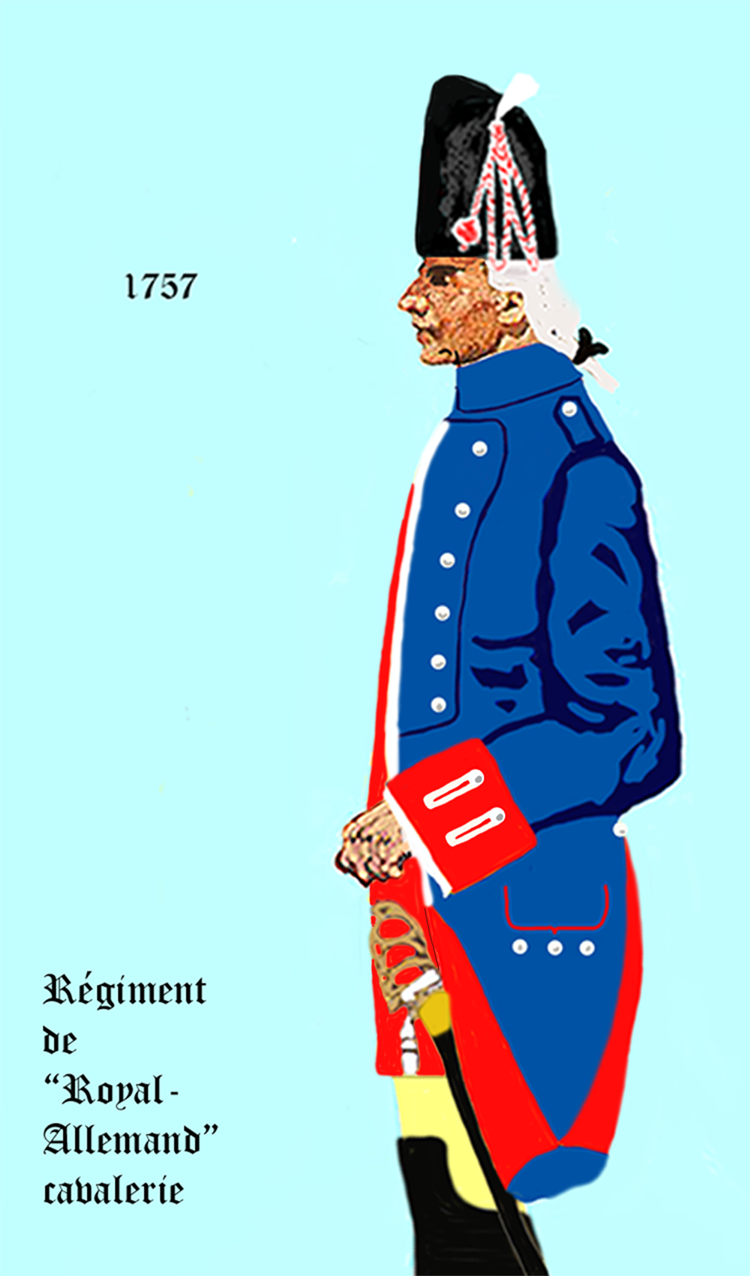
Régiment Royal-Allemand cavalerie 1757 - 1762

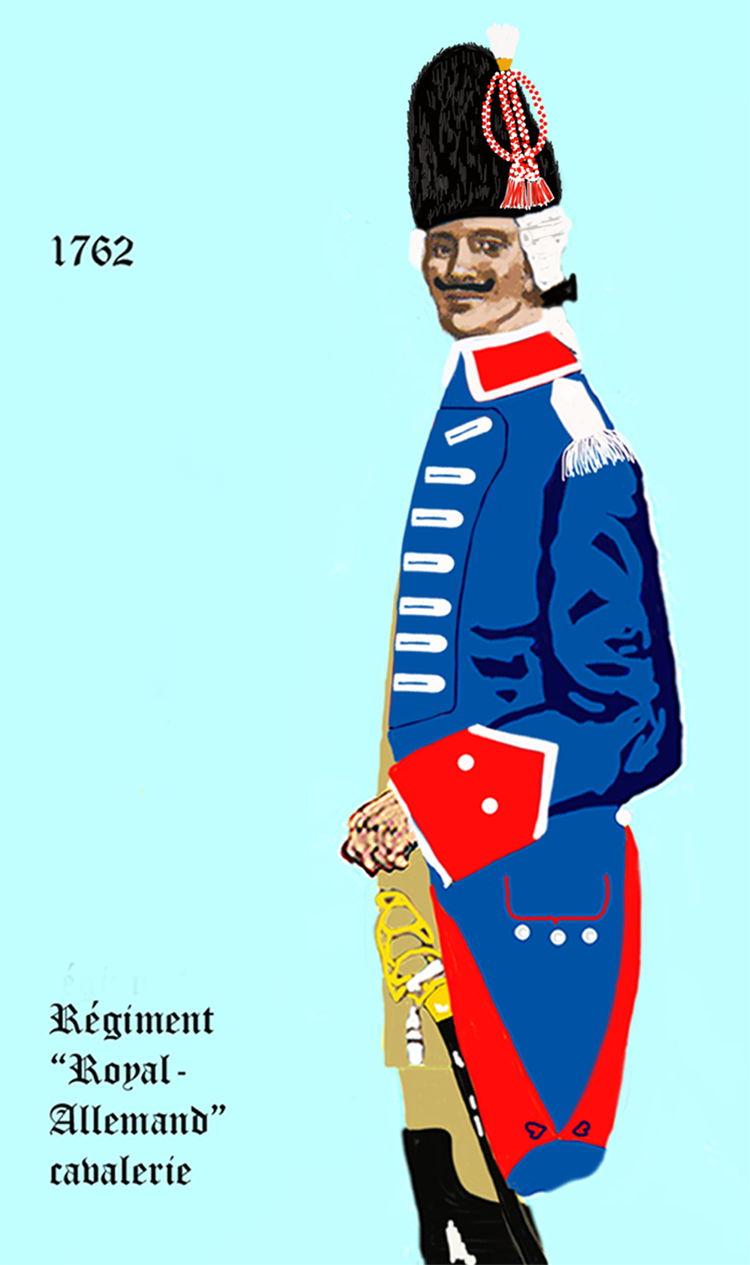
Régiment Royal-Allemand cavalerie 1762 - 1767

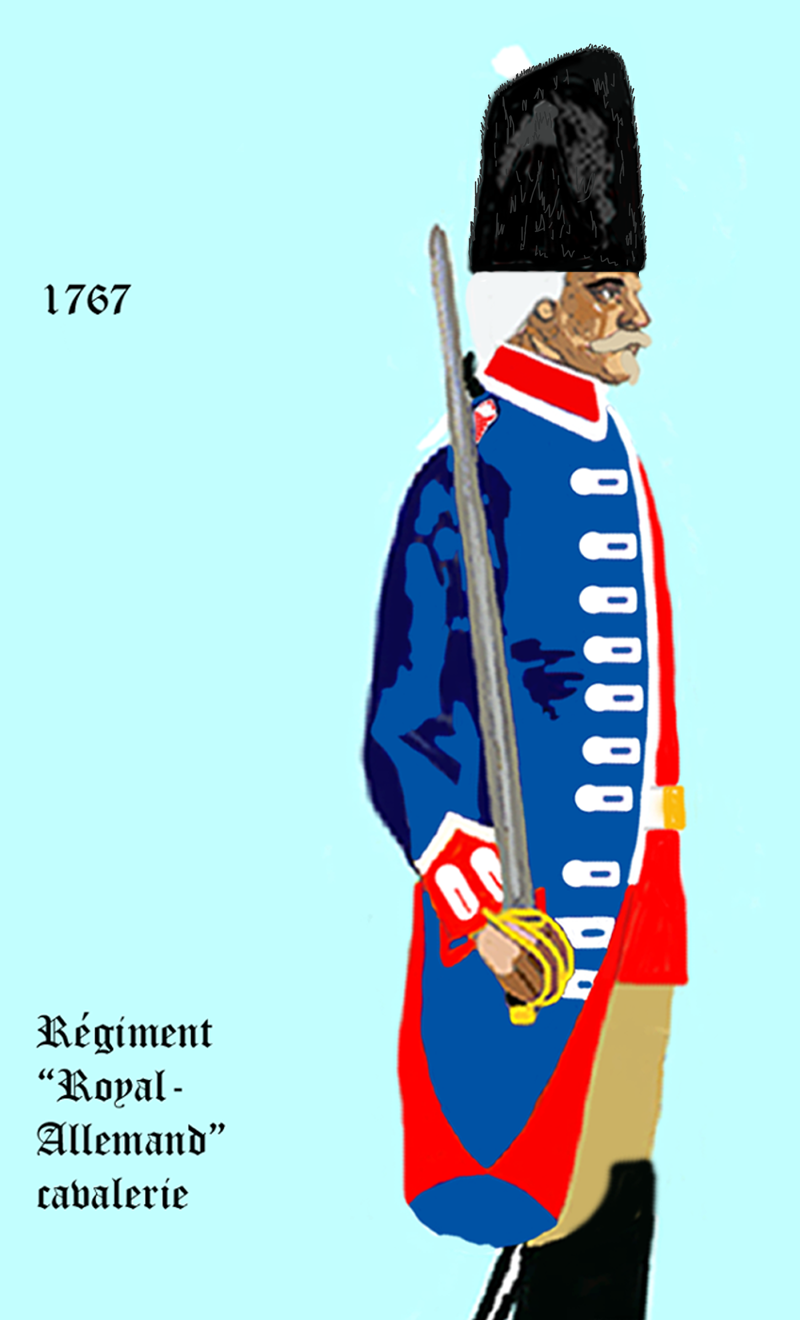
Régiment Royal-Allemand cavalerie 1767 - 1776

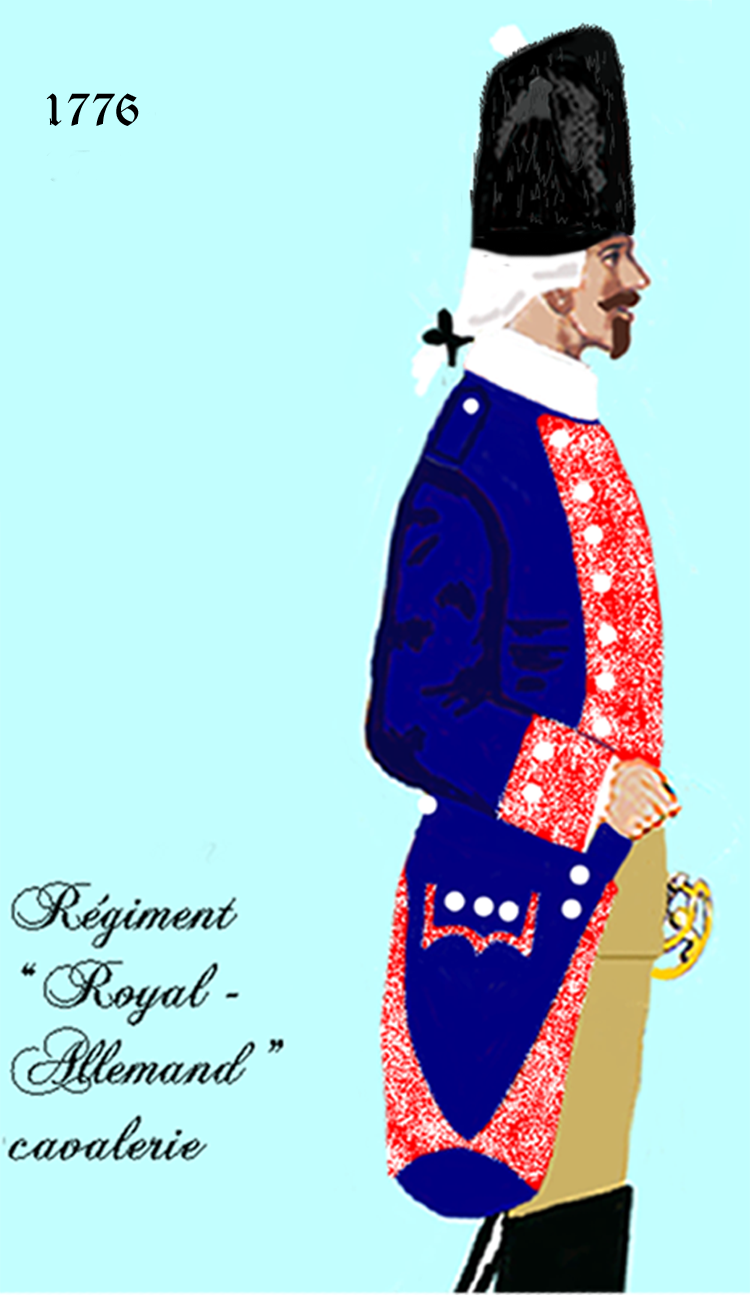
Régiment Royal-Allemand cavalerie 1776 - 1779

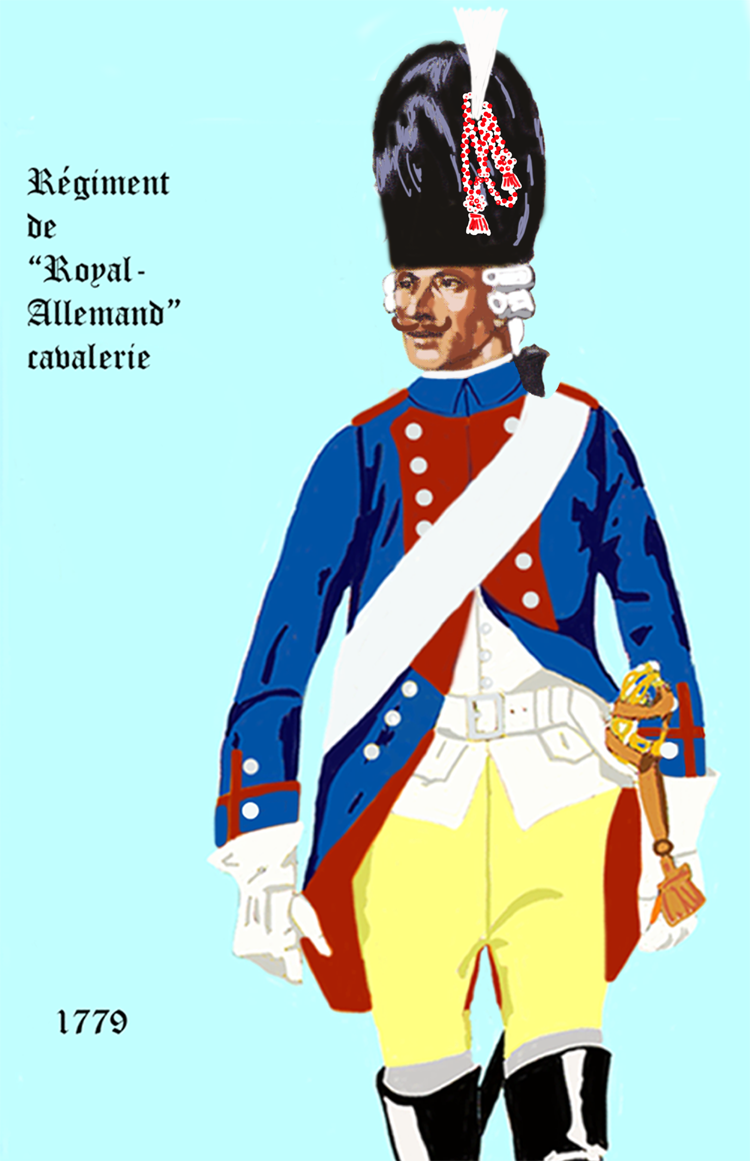
Régiment Royal-Allemand cavalerie 1779 - 1786

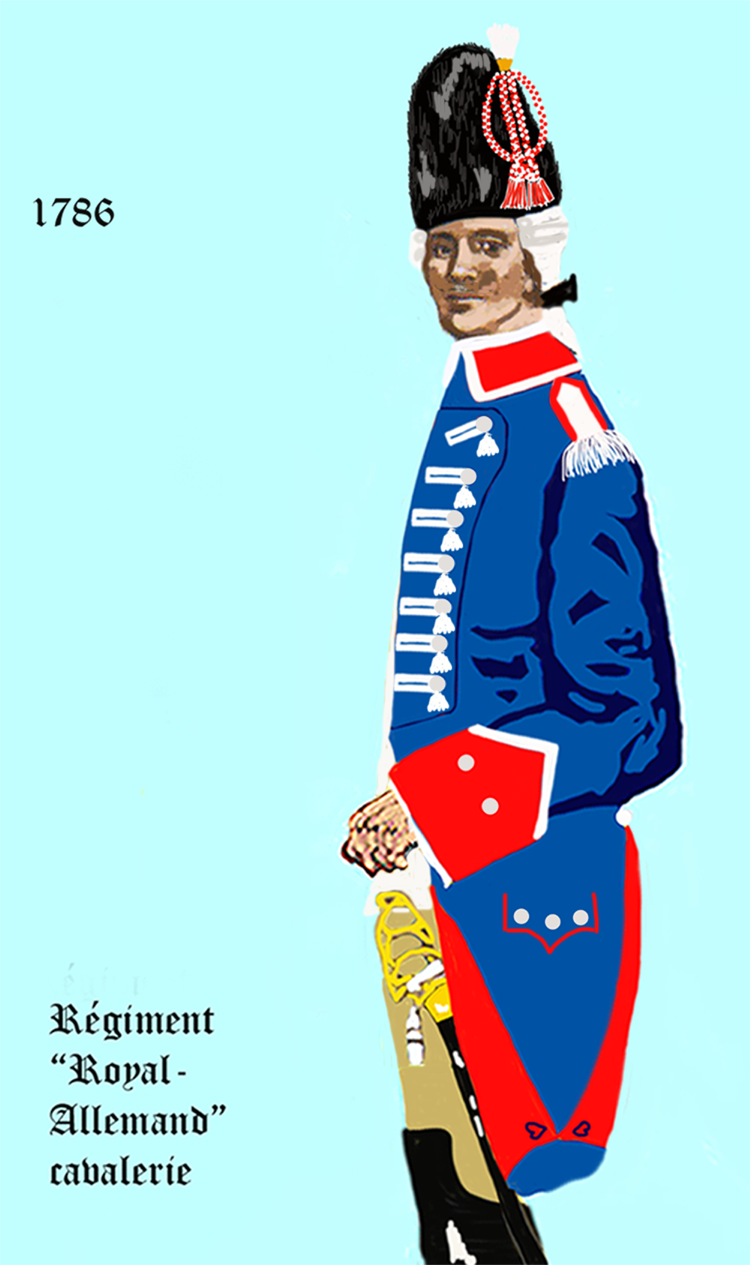
Régiment Royal-Allemand cavalerie 1786 - 1791

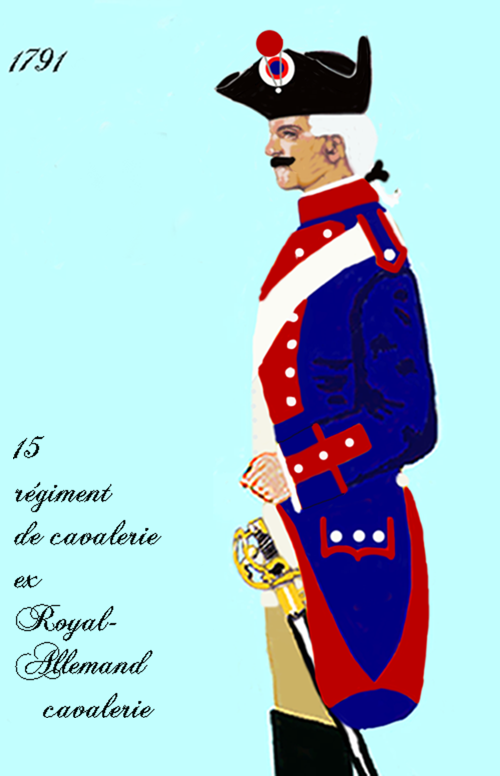
15^{e} régiment de cavalerie 1791 - 1792
