= Arapesh languages =

Group of Torricelli languages of Papua New Guinea

Arapesh
- Geographic distribution: eastern Sandaun Province and northern East Sepik Province, Papua New Guinea
- Ethnicity: Arapesh people
- Linguistic classification: Torricelli: Arapesh
- Subdivisions: Bukiyip (Mountain); Bumbita; Mufian (Southern); Abu'

Language codes
- Glottolog: arap1279
- The Torricelli languages as classified by Foley (2018)

The Arapesh languages or Arapeshan languages are several closely related Torricelli languages of the 32,000 Arapesh people of Papua New Guinea. They are spoken in eastern Sandaun Province and northern East Sepik Province, Papua New Guinea.

The Arapesh languages are among the better-studied of Papuan languages and are most distinctive in their gender systems, which contain up to thirteen genders (noun classes) with noun-phrase concordance. Mufian, for example, has 17 noun classes for count nouns plus two extra noun classes, i.e. proper names and place names. (See Mufian language for examples.)

== Phonology ==
The most notable feature of the Arapesh phoneme inventory is the use of labialization as a contrastive device.

=== Consonants ===
		Bilabial	Alveolar	Palatal	Velar		Glottal	
		Bilabial	Alveolar	Palatal	plain	labialized	plain	labialized
Nasal		m	n	ɲ				
Stop	voiceless		t	tʃ	k	kʷ		
Stop	voiced		d	dʒ	ɡ	ɡʷ		
Fricative			s			xʷ	h	hʷ
Flap			ɾ					
Lateral			l					

=== Vowels ===
	Front	Central	Back
High	i	ɨ	u
Mid	e	ə	o
Low		a	

Arapesh syllables have the structure (C)V(V)(C), though monosyllables always contain coda consonants.

Higher central vowels /ɨ ə/ sometimes break up consonant clusters in the middle of words.

== Pronouns ==
Pronouns in Arapesh and other related Torricelli languages:

	Kombio	Mountain Arapesh	Southern Arapesh	Urim	Urat	Aruop	Kayik
1SG	apm	yek~eik	aeʔ	kupm	ŋam	am	kəmex
2SG	yikn	ɲak~ɲek	inəʔ	kitn	nin	yi	kiyox
3SG	kɨl	ənan~nani	ənən	kil	kin	din	təno
1PL	an(t)	okok~kwakwi	apə	men	poi	mendi	kupox

== Vocabulary comparison ==
The following basic vocabulary words are from the Trans-New Guinea database.

The words cited constitute translation equivalents, whether they are cognate (e.g. bʌrʌkʰa, berag for “head”) or not (e.g. ɛligʌ, atah for “ear”).

gloss	Abu' Arapesh	Bukiyip
head	bʌrʌkʰa	berag
hair	bʌrʌkʰa	
ear	ɛligʌ	atah
eye	ŋʌim	nabep
nose	mutu	
tooth	nʌluh	nau̥h̥
tongue	ʌhʌkʌ	jaham
leg	burʔah	aijag
louse	numunʌl	
dog	nubʌt	nybat
pig	bul	
bird	ʌlimil	aramir
egg	ʌlhuʌb	juhuryb
blood	usibɛl	ausibør
bone	pisitʌnʌgel	bøløpigør
skin	beni'koh	jageniu̥h̥
breast	numʌb	
tree	lʌ·wʌk	lawag
man	ʌʔlemʌn	araman
woman	numʌto	ara- matoku
sun	uʔwʌh	aun
moon	'ʌ'un	aun
water	ʌbʌl	bør
fire	unih	nih̥
stone	utʌm	utom
road, path	iʌh	
name	ɛigil	
eat	'nʌsʌh	
one	etin	
two	biəs	bium

== Grammar ==
Recent shifts have moved Arapesh languages from the typical Papuan SOV to a SVO order, along with a corresponding shift in adpositional order. Most modifiers usually precede the noun, though as a result of changes in word order genitives and nouns do not have a fixed order.

The language's unique gender system is largely based on the ending of the noun. There are cognate pairings of each gender for singular and plural numbers. The whole gender system, unlike most of the comparable complexity in Niger–Congo languages, is sex-based: Gender IV is for all female beings and Gender VII for male ones. Arapesh culture forbids the use of personal names, so that kinship nouns are used extensively to address even intimate relatives.

Arapesh languages also have a system of verbal nouns: there by default belong to gender VIII.

Gender agreement, along with that for person and number, occurs with all adjectives, numerals and interrogative pronouns and the subject and object of verbs. Verbs in Arapesh languages are inflected by means of prefixes. The basic template for this inflection is the order SUBJECT-MOOD-ROOT.
