= Samap language =

Samap is the name of a village in Turubu Rural LLG in East Sepik Province, Papua New Guinea.

It may refer to the following two languages that are spoken in the village:

- Elepi language
- Kaiep language

The Kis language is also spoken just to the southeast of Samap village.
