= Marienberg (disambiguation) =

Marienberg is a town in Saxony, Germany.

Marienberg ("Mary's mountain" in German) may also refer to:

- Bad Marienberg, a town in the Westerwaldkreis of Rhineland-Palatinate
- Marienberg Fortress, Würzburg, Bavaria, Germany
- Marienberg Abbey, a Benedictine abbey near the village of Burgeis, South Tyrol, Italy
- Mariënberg, a small village in the municipality of Hardenberg in the Netherlands
- Baltic German name for Maarjamäe, Tallinn, Estonia
- Marienberg languages of Papua New Guinea
- Marienberg Hills of Papua New Guinea
- Marienberg, Papua New Guinea
- Marienberg Rural LLG of Papua New Guinea

== See also ==
- Marienburg (disambiguation)
