= Biem language =

Oceanic language spoken in New Guinea

Biem
- Bam
- Native to: Papua New Guinea
- Region: East Sepik Province
- Native speakers: (2,200 cited 2000 census)
- Language family: Austronesian: Malayo-Polynesian; Oceanic; Western Oceanic; Schouten; Kairiru–Manam; Manam; Biem

Language codes
- ISO 639-3: bmc
- Glottolog: biem1237

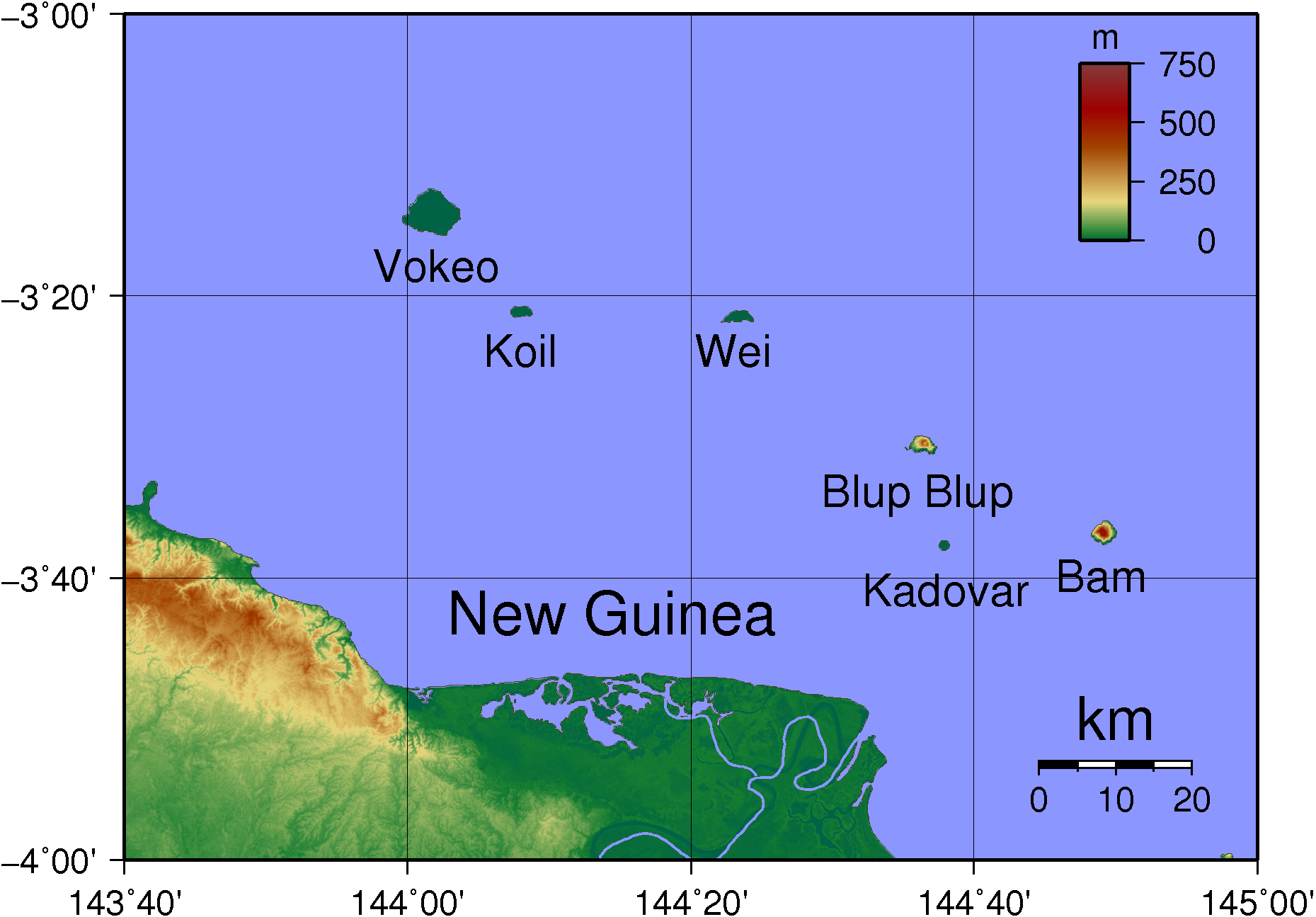
Schouten Islands in Papua New Guinea

Biem, or Bam, is an Oceanic language of northeast New Guinea, spoken on Bam, Blup Blup, Kadovar, and Vial (also known as Wei) islands (eastern four of the Schouten Islands) off the coast of Wewak.
