= Schouten languages =

Linkage of Austronesian languages

Schouten
- Geographic distribution: Schouten Islands and nearby coast of northern New Guinea
- Linguistic classification: Austronesian: Malayo-Polynesian; Oceanic; Western Oceanic; North New Guinea; Schouten
- Proto-language: Proto-Schouten

Language codes
- Glottolog: scho1242

The Schouten languages are a linkage of Austronesian languages in northern Papua New Guinea. They are in contact with various North Papuan languages, particularly the Skou and some Torricelli languages.

They are named after the Schouten Islands of Papua New Guinea.

== Language ==
- Schouten
  - Siau family
    - Arop-Sissano
    - Sera, Sissano
    - Ulau-Suain
    - Tumleo
    - Yakamul (Kap, Ali)
  - Kairiru linkage:
    - Kaiep
    - Kairiru
    - Terebu
  - Manam linkage:
    - Biem
    - Kis
    - Manam
    - Medebur
    - Sepa
    - Wogeo

Ethnologue adds Malol to Siau.

The Siau family is spoken in Sandaun Province. The Kairiru linkage is spoken in East Sepik Province. The Manam linkage is spoken in Madang Province and Wewak Islands Rural LLG of East Sepik Province.
