= Bam Island =

Bam Island may refer to:

- Bam Island (Papua New Guinea)
- Bamseom
