= Wewak Harbour =

Wewak Harbour is the harbour that serves the town of Wewak, Papua New Guinea. Wewak Point to the west, Cape Boram to the east and Mission Point to the south form the borders of the harbour.

== History ==
The Imperial Japanese Army occupied the harbour on 18 December 1942 unopposed. The USS Wahoo, an American Gato Class submarine, famously reconnoitered the harbor in 1943. The Australian Army liberated the area in May 1945. The wrecks of several Japanese vessels are located in the harbour. MV Busama sank after catching fire in 1959.

== Notes ==
Citations
