= Blup Blup =

Island in Papua New Guinea

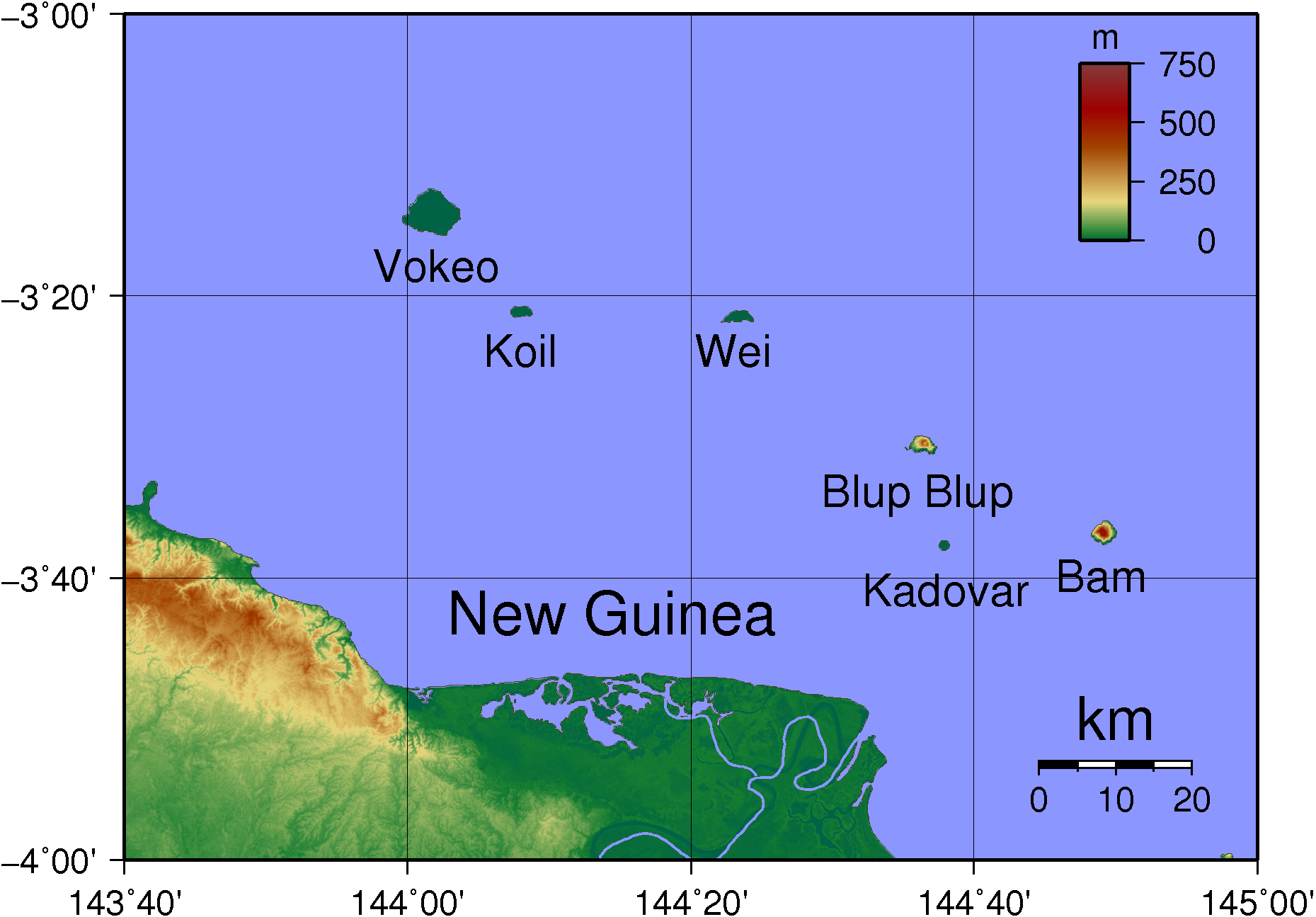
- Schouten Islands in Papua New Guinea
- Interactive map of Blup Blup

Geography
- Coordinates: 3°31′S 144°36′E
- Archipelago: Schouten Islands
- Area: 3.96 km^{2} (1.53 sq mi)
- Coastline: 7.49 km (4.654 mi)

Administration
- Papua New Guinea
- Province: East Sepik

Blup Blup Island is a small forested island off the northern coast of Papua New Guinea about 30 km (19 mi) offshore from Cape Girgir and is considered part of the Schouten Islands. It is located at latitude S 3°30'46" and longitude E 144°35'16" and its highest point is at 402 metres. The island has a small population and is in the Angoram District of the East Sepik Province of PNG.

The island is volcanic (a stratovolcano) and a weak thermal area exists on the north west coast. The island is only 3.5 km (2.2 mi) wide with an irregular coastline and ancient lava flows. It is thought that Blup Blup last erupted in the Holocene. Fresh water is available on the island from wells. Other islands in the vicinity include Kadovar and Wei Island. There is a small islet about 200 m (650 ft) off the south-west shore of the island called Mut Mut, where there is a geodetic monitoring facility.

== Description ==
Blup Blup has been described as deeply eroded. The island features a well-developed reef, a lagoon, cinder cones, and hot springs all of which suggest early volcanic activity.

== History ==
The first recorded sighting by Europeans of Kadovar Island was by the Spanish navigator Iñigo Órtiz de Retes on 21 July 1545, when on board of the carrack San Juan tried to return from Tidore to New Spain. During World War II, the island had a Japanese radio station and the islanders assisted Australian troops to locate it. In January 2018 there was a volcanic eruption on the neighbouring Kadovar island. Five hundred inhabitants of Kadovar were initially evacuated to Blup Blup but due to a lack of food and fresh water for so many, were later transferred to the mainland.

== See also ==
- List of volcanoes in Papua New Guinea
