= Kis language =

Oceanic language of northeast New Guinea

Kis
- Native to: Papua New Guinea
- Region: East Sepik Province
- Native speakers: (220 cited 2000)
- Language family: Austronesian: Malayo-Polynesian; Oceanic; Western Oceanic; Schouten; Kairiru–Manam; Manam; Kis

Language codes
- ISO 639-3: kis
- Glottolog: kiss1246
- ELP: Kis

Kis is an Oceanic language of East Sepik Province in Papua New Guinea. It is spoken to the southeast of Samap village (3.737823°S 143.933158°E) in Turubu Rural LLG, East Sepik Province.
