= Voiceless bilabial fricative =

Consonantal sound represented by ⟨ɸ⟩ in IPA

ɸ
- IPA number: 126

Audio sample
- source · help

Encoding
- Entity (decimal): &#632;
- Unicode (hex): U+0278
- X-SAMPA: p\
- Braille: ⠨ (braille pattern dots-46) ⠋ (braille pattern dots-124)
Image

A voiceless bilabial fricative is a type of consonantal sound, used in some spoken languages. The symbol in the International Phonetic Alphabet that represents this sound is ⟨ɸ⟩, a Latinized form of the Greek letter Phi.

== Features ==
Features of a voiceless bilabial fricative:

- Its manner of articulation is fricative, which means it is produced by constricting air flow through a narrow channel at the place of articulation, causing turbulence.
- Its place of articulation is bilabial, which means it is articulated with both lips.
- Its phonation is voiceless, which means it is produced without vibrations of the vocal cords. In some languages the vocal cords are actively separated, so it is always voiceless; in others the cords are lax, so that it may take on the voicing of adjacent sounds.
- It is an oral consonant, which means that air is not allowed to escape through the nose.
- Because the sound is not produced with airflow over the tongue, the median–lateral dichotomy does not apply.
- Its airstream mechanism is pulmonic, which means it is articulated by pushing air only with the intercostal muscles and abdominal muscles, as in most speech sounds.

== Occurrence ==
Language		Word	IPA	Meaning	Notes
Ainu		フチ	[ɸu̜tʃi]	'grandmother'	Allophone of /h/ before /u/
Angor		fi	[ɸi]	'body'	
Bahuana		[dʌŭɸʌŭ]		'mouth'	
Bengali	Eastern dialects	ফল	[ɸɔl]	'fruit'	Allophone of /f/ in some eastern dialects; regular allophone of /pʰ/ in western dialects
Damin		fiwi	[ɸiwi]	'boomerang'	
English	Scouse				Allophone of /p/. See British English phonology
Ewe		éƒá	[éɸá]	'he polished'	Contrasts with /f/
Italian	Tuscan	i capitani	[iˌhäɸiˈtäːni]	'the captains'	Postvocalic allophone of /p/. See Italian phonology and Tuscan gorgia.
Itelmen		чуфчуф	[tʃuɸtʃuɸ]	'rain'	
Japanese		腐敗 / fuhai	[ɸɯhai]	'decay'	Allophone of /h/ before /ɯ/. See Japanese phonology
Kaingang		fy	[ɸɨ]	'seed'	
Korean		후두개 / hudugae	[ɸʷudugɛ]	'epiglottis'	Allophone of /h/ before /o/, /u/, and /w/. See Korean phonology
Kwama		[kòːɸɛ́]		'basket'	
Māori		whakapapa	[ɸɐkɐˈpɐpɐ]	'genealogy'	Now more commonly /f/ due to the influence of English. See Māori phonology.
Nepali		बाफ	[bäɸ]	'vapour'	Allophone of /pʰ/. See Nepali phonology
Odoodee		pagai	[ɸɑɡɑi]	'coconut'	
Okinawan		fifaci	[ɸiɸatɕi]	'type of spice'	
Spanish	Some dialects	fuera	[ˈɸwe̞ɾa̠]	'outside'	Non-standard variant of /f/. See Spanish phonology
Spanish	North-Central Peninsular	abdicar	[a̠ɸðiˈka̠ɾ]	'abdicate'	Allophone of /b/ in the coda. In this dialect, the unvoiced coda obstruents - /p, t, k/ - are realized as fricatives only if they precede a voiced consonant; otherwise, they emerge as stops.
Spanish	Southern Peninsular	los vuestros	[lɔh ˈɸːwɛhtːɾɔh]	'yours'	It varies with [βː] in some accents. Allophone of /b/ after /s/.
Shompen		kofeoi	[koɸeoi]	'bench'	
Sylheti		ꠙꠥꠀ/fua	[ɸua]	'boy'	
Tahitian		ʻōfī	[ʔoːɸiː]	'snake'	Allophone of /f/
Taruma		fwa	[ɸʷa]	'fire'	
Turkish	Some speakers	ufuk	[u̞ˈɸu̞k]	'horizon'	Allophone of /f/ before rounded vowels and, to a lesser extent, word-finally after rounded vowels. See Turkish phonology
Turkmen		fabrik	[ɸabrik]	'factory'	
Yalë		dife	[diɸe]	'village'	

=== Voiceless bilabial approximant ===
Voiceless bilabial approximant

ɸ˕

Audio sample
- source · help
Image

A voiceless bilabial approximant is a similar sound with less turbulent airflow. The IPA has no dedicated symbol that represents this sound, but it may be transcribed as ⟨ɸ̞⟩ (a lowered [ɸ]), or equivalently ⟨ɸ˕⟩ (with the obsolete adjacent diacritic) to avoid clash with the ascender and descender.

Language		Word	IPA	Meaning	Notes
Kamasau	Segi dialect	ngape	[ˈŋɑɸ̞e] (Note: Within the 2014 research mentioned by Holt and Sanders, the same word was transcribed from S1 in the Segi dialect as [ˈŋɑpɛ]. This demonstrates Kamasau's willingness in free allophonic variation as described in the Notes section on this table.)	'bone'	Allophone of the voiceless bilabial phoneme, described by different authors as either /ɸ/ or /p/. In free variation with [b, p, pʰ, p̆, ɸ, ɸ̞], depending on the consonant position and dialect.
Mazatec	Mazatlán	bi	[ɸ̞ī]	'go'	Primary realization of /β̞/ when pre-aspirated.

== See also ==
- Index of phonetics articles

== Sources ==
- Boyd-Bowman, Peter (1953), "Sobre la pronunciación del español en el Ecuador", Nueva Revista de Filología Hispánica, 7: 221–233, doi:10.24201/nrfh.v7i1/2.310
- Cotton, Eleanor Greet; Sharp, John (1988), Spanish in the Americas, Georgetown University Press, ISBN 978-0-87840-094-2
- Göksel, Asli; Kerslake, Celia (2005), Turkish: a comprehensive grammar, Routledge, ISBN 978-0415114943
- Hall, Robert A. Jr. (1944), "Italian phonemes and orthography", Italica, 21 (2), American Association of Teachers of Italian: 72–82, doi:10.2307/475860, JSTOR 475860
- Ladefoged, Peter (2005), Vowels and Consonants (Second ed.), Blackwell
- Okada, Hideo (1999), "Japanese", in International Phonetic Association (ed.), Handbook of the International Phonetic Association: A Guide to the Use of the International Phonetic Alphabet, Cambridge University Press, pp. 117–119, ISBN 978-0-52163751-0
- Pérez, Ramón Morillo-Velarde; Aguilar, Rafael Cano; Jiménez, Antonio Narbona (1998), El Español hablado en Andalucía, Editorial Ariel, ISBN 84-344-8225-8

Place →	Labial					Coronal										Dorsal					Laryngeal			
Manner ↓	Bilabial		Labiodental		Linguolabial		Dental		Alveolar		Postalveolar		Retroflex		(Alveolo-)palatal		Velar		Uvular		Pharyngeal/epiglottal		Glottal	
Nasal	m̥	m	ɱ̊	ɱ		n̼	n̪̊	n̪	n̥	n	n̠̊	n̠	ɳ̊	ɳ	ɲ̊	ɲ	ŋ̊	ŋ	ɴ̥	ɴ				
Plosive	p	b	p̪	b̪	t̼	d̼	t̪	d̪	t	d			ʈ	ɖ	c	ɟ	k	ɡ	q	ɢ	ʡ		ʔ	
Sibilant affricate							t̪s̪	d̪z̪	ts	dz	t̠ʃ	d̠ʒ	tʂ	dʐ	tɕ	dʑ								
Non-sibilant affricate	pɸ	bβ	p̪f	b̪v			t̪θ	d̪ð	tɹ̝̊	dɹ̝	t̠ɹ̠̊˔	d̠ɹ̠˔			cç	ɟʝ	kx	ɡɣ	qχ	ɢʁ	ʡʜ	ʡʢ	ʔh	
Sibilant fricative							s̪	z̪	s	z	ʃ	ʒ	ʂ	ʐ	ɕ	ʑ								
Non-sibilant fricative	ɸ	β	f	v	θ̼	ð̼	θ	ð	θ̠	ð̠	ɹ̠̊˔	ɹ̠˔	ɻ̊˔	ɻ˔	ç	ʝ	x	ɣ	χ	ʁ	ħ	ʕ	h	ɦ
Approximant		β̞		ʋ				ð̞		ɹ		ɹ̠		ɻ		j		ɰ						˷
Tap/flap		ⱱ̟		ⱱ					ɾ̥	ɾ			ɽ̊	ɽ						ɢ̆		ʡ̆		
Trill	ʙ̥	ʙ							r̥	r		r̠	ɽ̊r̥	ɽr					ʀ̥	ʀ	ʜ	ʢ		
Lateral affricate									tɬ	dɮ			tꞎ	d𝼅	c𝼆	ɟʎ̝	k𝼄	ɡʟ̝						
Lateral fricative							ɬ̪		ɬ	ɮ			ꞎ	𝼅	𝼆	ʎ̝	𝼄	ʟ̝						
Lateral approximant								l̪	l̥	l		l̠	ɭ̊	ɭ	ʎ̥	ʎ	ʟ̥	ʟ		ʟ̠				
Lateral tap/flap									ɺ̥	ɺ			𝼈̊	𝼈		ʎ̆		ʟ̆						

		BL	LD	D	A	PA	RF	P	V	U
Implosive	Voiced	ɓ			ɗ		ᶑ	ʄ	ɠ	ʛ
Implosive	Voiceless	ɓ̥			ɗ̥		ᶑ̊	ʄ̊	ɠ̊	ʛ̥
Ejective	Stop	pʼ			tʼ		ʈʼ	cʼ	kʼ	qʼ
Ejective	Affricate		p̪fʼ	tθʼ	tsʼ	tʃʼ	tʂʼ	tɕʼ	kxʼ	qχʼ
Ejective	Fricative	ɸʼ	fʼ	θʼ	sʼ	ʃʼ	ʂʼ	ɕʼ	xʼ	χʼ
Ejective	Lateral affricate				tɬʼ			c𝼆ʼ	k𝼄ʼ	q𝼄ʼ
Ejective	Lateral fricative				ɬʼ					
Click (top: velar; bottom: uvular)	Tenuis	kʘ qʘ		kǀ qǀ	kǃ qǃ		k𝼊 q𝼊	kǂ qǂ		
Click (top: velar; bottom: uvular)	Voiced	ɡʘ ɢʘ		ɡǀ ɢǀ	ɡǃ ɢǃ		ɡ𝼊 ɢ𝼊	ɡǂ ɢǂ		
Click (top: velar; bottom: uvular)	Nasal	ŋʘ ɴʘ		ŋǀ ɴǀ	ŋǃ ɴǃ		ŋ𝼊 ɴ𝼊	ŋǂ ɴǂ	ʞ	
Click (top: velar; bottom: uvular)	Tenuis lateral				kǁ qǁ					
Click (top: velar; bottom: uvular)	Voiced lateral				ɡǁ ɢǁ					
Click (top: velar; bottom: uvular)	Nasal lateral				ŋǁ ɴǁ					
