= Cherubim Dambui =

Papua New Guinea politician and Roman Catholic bishop

Cherubim Alfred Dambui, GCL, OBE (23 February 1948 – 24 June 2010) was a Papua New Guinea politician and Roman Catholic bishop. Dambui became the first Sepik to be ordained a Catholic priest in 1974 and served as the first premier of East Sepik Province beginning in 1976. Dambui also served as the auxiliary bishop of the Roman Catholic Archdiocese of Port Moresby, Papua New Guinea.

== Biography ==
=== Early life ===
Dambui was born on 23 February 1948 in Timbunke, East Sepik, Territory of Papua and New Guinea. He was the oldest of his family's four sisters and six brothers born to his mother and father, Henry Nambau. Dambui attended Angoram Primary School in Angoram from 1957 to 1961. Dambui then completed 7th–10th grades at Kerevat National High School, which he attended from 1961 until 1966. Dambui enrolled at St. John's minor seminary in 1966 for his 11th and 12th grade years.

In 1968, Dambui entered the Holy Spirit Seminary in Bomana, where he studied for the priesthood for six years. He was ordained a Catholic priest for the Roman Catholic Diocese of Wewak on 5 December 1974, becoming the first Sepik to be ordained a Catholic priest.

=== Political career ===
Papua New Guinea gained independence from Australia in 1975. Prime Minister Michael Somare appointed Dambui as the first interim premier of East Sepik Province in 1976, when the new provincial government was established. He served as the interim premier until 1979, when he became the permanent premier of East Sepik. Dambui remained in office as premier until 1983. Today, the head of East Sepik Province is now known as the governor due to the 1995 Provincial and Local Level Government Act.

=== Catholic Bishop ===
Dambui took a two-year sabbatical. He worked in several positions within the Catholic Church including a seminary rector, teacher and parish priest. In 1995, Dambui became the vicar general of the Roman Catholic Diocese of Wewak, based in East Sepik. He worked in the Wewak diocese until 2000.

Dambui was appointed the auxiliary bishop of the Roman Catholic Archdiocese of Port Moresby on 30 October 2000, and was ordained on 6 February 2001. He remained in this position until his death in 2010. Additionally, Dambui served as the Roman Catholic titular bishop of Sussar.

Cherubim Dambui died of kidney failure on 24 June 2010 at a hospital in Manila, Philippines, at the age of 62. A memorial service, which was attended by dignitaries, including Prime Minister Michael Somare and Lady Veronica Somare, was held at the shrine of the Don Bosco Technology Institute (DBITT) in Port Moresby on 30 June 2010. In his eulogy, Prime Minister Somare spoke of his relationship with Dambui, "I have always been impressed with people who could accommodate and balance a traditional culture with Western and even Christian values...I say this because the late Bishop Dambui was a master craftsman, musician and a truly modest Melanesian leader who believed the words of God which he spread amongst us...My family connection with the late bishop existed long before we actually met, my uncle and aunty were employed at the Angoram Health centre where Henry Nambau – father of the late bishop also worked and lived with his family. It was at this time that the bond between our families was first established." Powes Parkop, the governor of the National Capital District and mayor of Port Moresby, donated a US$1,777 cheque to the Papuan Catholic Church to cover the costs of the funeral.

Dambui's body was flown to Wewak, East Sepik Province, and flown by helicopter to his birthplace, Timbunke, for viewing. He was then laid in state at the East Sepik provincial capital building in Wewak. A Roman Catholic funeral was held at the Christ the King cathedral in Wirui, Papua New Guinea.

Dambui was survived by his father, Henry Nambau, who was married to his mother for more than fifty years, until her death in 2009.
