= Terebu language =

Language

Terebu
- Region: Northern New Guinea
- Native speakers: (130 cited 1990)
- Language family: Austronesian: Malayo-Polynesian; Oceanic; Western Oceanic; Schouten; Kairiru–Manam; Kairiru; Terebu

Language codes
- ISO 639-3: trb
- Glottolog: tere1276
- ELP: Terebu

Terebu (Turubu) is one of three Kairiru languages spoken in East Sepik Province, Papua New Guinea. It is spoken in Turubu village (3.658382°S 143.81428°E) of Turubu Rural LLG, East Sepik Province.
