= Kamasau language =

Torricelli language of Papua New Guinea

Kamasau
- Native to: Papua New Guinea
- Region: East Sepik Province
- Native speakers: 960 (2003)
- Language family: Torricelli: Marienberg; Kamasau

Language codes
- ISO 639-3: kms
- Glottolog: kama1367
- ELP: Kamasau
- Kamasau language is classified as Critically Endangered by the UNESCO Atlas of the World's Languages in Danger.
- Coordinates: 3.735538°S 143.815344°E

Kamasau is an endangered Torricelli language of Turubu Rural LLG, East Sepik Province, Papua New Guinea.

== Dialects ==
There are four dialects:

- The Ghini dialect, spoken in Wandomi (3.868514°S 143.865581°E), Wobu (3.919328°S 143.933212°E), and Ibab (3.866041°S 143.860699°E) villages.
- The Hagi dialect, spoken in Kenyari village (3.761477°S 143.751797°E).
- The Segi dialect, spoken in Kamasau (3.735538°S 143.815344°E).
- And the Soigi dialect, spoken in Tring (3.790725°S 143.841425°E) and Wau (3.787993°S 143.87474°E) villages, with some speakers also in Kamasau.

The Ghini dialect is divergent. The dictionary is based on the Segi dialect of Tring, but contains information for all 4 of the dialects as well.

== Phonology ==
=== Consonants ===
Consonants
		Labial	Alveolar	Palatal	Velar	Glottal
Plosive	voiceless		t	tʃ	k	ʔ
Plosive	voiced	b	d	dʒ	ɡ	
Plosive	prenasalized	ᵐb	ⁿd	ᶮdʒ	ᵑg	
Fricative	voiceless	ɸ	s			h
Fricative	voiced	β			ɣ	
Nasal		m	n	ɲ	ŋ	
Trill			r			
Approximant		w		j		

=== Vowels ===
Vowels
	Front	Central	Back
Close	i		u
Mid	e	ə	o
Open		a	

== Orthography ==
The Kamasau alphabet consists of 29 letters derived from the Latin script:

Majuscule forms (also called uppercase or capital letters)
A	B	Ch	D	E	F	G	Gh	I	J	K	L	M	Mb	N	Nd	Ng	Nj	Ny	O	P	Q	R	S	T	U	V	W	Y
Minuscule forms (also called lowercase or small letters)
a	b	ch	d	e	f	g	gh	i	j	k	l	m	mb	n	nd	ng	nj	ny	o	p	q	r	s	t	u	v	w	y
