= Forok language =

Torricelli language of Papua New Guinea

Forok
- Wunabag
- Native to: Papua New Guinea
- Region: East Sepik Province
- Language family: Torricelli: Marienberg; Bungain–Forok; Forok

Language codes
- ISO 639-3: None (mis)
- Glottolog: None

Forok is a Torricelli language of Papua New Guinea. It is sometimes classified as a dialect of Bungain.
