= Māori phonology =

Phonology of the Maori language

Māori phonology is the system of sounds used in the spoken Māori language. The phonology is typical for a Polynesian language, with its phonetic inventory being one of the smallest in the world, with considerable variation in realisation. Māori retains the Proto-Polynesian syllable structure: (C)V(V(V)), with no closed syllables. The stress pattern differs from other Polynesian languages.

== Phonemes ==
The sound system of Māori is conservative; it is close to the system the Proto-Central Eastern Polynesian language had. Most Māori dialects have ten consonant and five vowel phonemes. The most unstable phonemes are /f/ and /ŋ/.

Despite the widely held belief that the Māori phonetic system is simple and straightforward, the realisation of Māori phonemes differs significantly, depending on the speaker's age, the chosen register and other factors.

The most frequent Māori phonemes are /a/ (18%), /i/ (11.3%), /t/ (9.8%). In an average text, vowels make up slightly more than 60% of all the phonemes. Several combinations are extremely rare: /fo/, /fu/; also /wo/ and /wu/ can only be found in loanwords. The first two combinations are rare because *f + rounded vowel became merged with *s > /h/; the second pair is not attested in any reconstructions of the Proto-Polynesian language.

=== Consonants ===
Māori consonant phonemes
| | Labial | Coronal | Velar | Glottal |
|---|---|---|---|---|
| Nasal | m | n | ŋ | |
| Stop | p | t | k | |
| Fricative | f [f, ɸ] | | | h |
| Approximant | w (Note: The phonemes /w/ and /u/ are similar in articulation, but contrast in words like tawa ('tawa tree') and taua ('you and me').) | | | |
| Liquid | | ɾ | | |

An unusual feature of Māori is the lack of sibilants, the most frequently encountered type of fricative consonants, as well as the lack of /j/, which is the most widespread semivowel phoneme in world languages.

Unvoiced phonemes, /h/, and fricative allophones of /t/ and /k/ are sporadically voiced in fast speech. Devoicing of sonorants has also been attested in the same environment.

In loanwords, /h/ affects surrounding vowels by making them more close.

The realisation of /t/ and /k/ can be palatalised or velarised; /t/ before /i/ and /u/ may become an affricate [t͡ʃ], especially if it occurs in the last syllable of the phrase. Starting from the 19th century both /t/ and /k/ are increasingly aspirated, though still never as aspirated as the voiceless stops in English. The article te 'the' can be pronounced as [ðə] in unstressed environments, sounding identical to its English translation. Sometimes /k/ is voiced to [ɣ] in unstressed syllables.

The place of articulation of /h/ is affected by the following front vowel: hī ('to fish') is pronounced as [çiː], with the palatal [ç]. In hoa ('friend') /h/ becomes labialised [hʷ].

Most speakers pronounce /f/ as [f], but historically [ɸ] dominated; the realisations [ʍ] and [h] also occurred (see § Historical phonology).

The /ɾ/ phoneme is most frequently realised as a tap, [ɾ]. Sometimes it is pronounced as an approximant, [ɹ], when spoken fast or when there are multiple successive instances of /ɾ/ (such as in kōrero 'speech'), and also as [l]; according to 19th-century data, the realisation of [l] was common for the dialects of the South Island, but occurs sporadically elsewhere.

=== Vowels ===
Māori vowels
| | Front | Central | Back |
|---|---|---|---|
| Close | /i, iː/ [i, iː] | /u, uː/ [ʉ, uː] | |
| Mid | /e, eː/ [ɛ, eː] | | /o, oː/ [ɔ, oː] |
| Open | /a, aː/ [ɐ, ɑː] (Note: /a/ is realised as [ɒ] by many speakers in certain environments, such as between [w] and [k]) | | |

The table above shows the five vowel phonemes (between slashes) and the allophones (in brackets) for some of them according to Bauer 1993 and Harlow 2006. The number of phonemes is small, so their realisation varies considerably.

Traditionally, the Māori phonemes /u/ and /uː/ were pronounced as back vowels. Partly due to the influence of New Zealand English, most younger speakers now realise them as central vowels, that is, [ʉ].

Due to the influence of New Zealand English, realisation of /e/ as [e̝], the mid front /e/ as well as its long counterpart /eː/ are variably merged with the close front /i, iː/, so that pī and kē as well as piki and kete are pronounced similarly.

Phrase-final vowels can be reduced. This is especially true for short vowels, but it happens to long ones as well in fast speech.

For Māori monophthongs there are minimal pairs differentiated by vowel length:

- kēkē ('armpit') ~ keke ('cake')
- kākā ('kākā bird') ~ kaka ('stem')
- kōkō ('tūī bird') ~ koko ('shovel')
- kīkī ('to speak') ~ kiki ('to kick')
- kūkū ('kererū bird') ~ kuku ('fear')

Long vowels are pronounced approximately twice as long as their short counterparts.

Some linguists consider long vowels to be variants of the short ones, while others count them separately. The first approach is supported by the fact that long vowels prosodically behave in an identical way as vowel sequences. For example, the imperative marker /e/ has a zero variant before verbs with three or more morae: e noho 'sit down!' and e tū 'stand up!', but patua 'hit it!' and kīa 'say it!'. This is compatible with an analysis of long [iː] as /ii/, thus kīa /kiia/.

The second approach is supported by the difference in quality between short vowels and the corresponding long vowels, with long vowels having a more peripheral position. This is most notably so in the pair /a/ ~ /aː/: /a/ is realised as [ɐ] while /aː/ is realised as [ɑː].

Besides monophthongs, Māori has many diphthong vowel phonemes. Although any short vowel combinations are possible, researchers disagree on which combinations constitute diphthongs. Formant frequency analysis distinguishes /ai̯/, /ae̯/, /ao̯/, /au̯/, /ou̯/ as diphthongs. With younger speakers, /ai̯, au̯/ start with a higher vowel than the [a] of /ae̯, ao̯/.

== Phonotactics ==
Māori phonotactics is often described using the term 'mora', which in this context is a combination of a short vowel and a preceding consonant (if present). Long vowels and diphthongs are counted as two moras. With these units it is easier to set up boundaries for reduplication, define allomorphs for some particles, and it also might be important to define the poetic meter of Māori poetry.

- kaumātua ('elder'):
  - four syllables: /kau.maa.tu.a/
  - six moras: /ka.u.ma.a.tu.a/

For example, when the word ako ('to learn') is reduplicated, the resulted word akoako ('give or take counsel') has the first syllable stressed, while the reduplication of oho ('to wake up') – ohooho ('to be awake') – often has the second syllable stressed. The reason is that /oa/ in the first example is a sequence of short vowels while /oo/ forms a single syllable peak.

== Stress ==
Other Polynesian languages mostly stress the second to last mora of the word, but Māori stress follows other rules. One of the rules requires assigning hierarchy to syllables, and if more than one syllable receives the highest rank, the first one gets stressed:

1. syllables with long vowels or geminate clusters
2. syllables with diphthongs
3. syllables with short vowels

In addition to word stress, Māori has phrasal stress that falls on the second to last mora:

- Ko te rangatíra, o tēnei márae ('the rangatira of this marae')
- Ko te maráe, o tēnei rángatira ('the marae of this rangatira')

This rule can also be applied to words that were formed by adding productive passive and nominalisation suffixes:

- káranga ('call') > karánga-tia ('be called')
- rángatira ('chief') > rangatíra-tanga ('chiefdom')

In reduplicated words, the first syllable of the repeated sequence has primary stress while the secondary stress falls on the first syllable of the second reduplication:

- āníwanìwa ('rainbow')

The prefix whaka- ('to cause something') is never stressed, but if it is added to a word starting with a vowel and forms a diphthong or a long vowel, the resulting syllable moves higher in the syllable hierarchy and might get stressed: whakaputa ('to emerge; to publish'), but whakaako ('to teach').

Loanwords from English do not follow the rules at all. Many researchers mention considerable variation in stress patterns, which indicates that further research is needed.

== Historical phonology ==
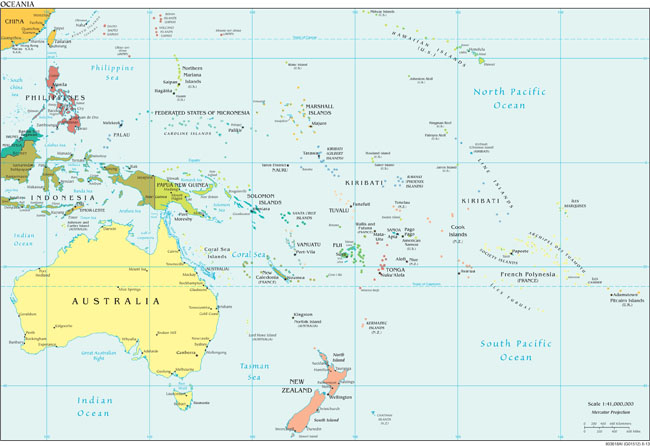
The map of Oceania

Reconstructions assume that Proto-Oceanic had 23 consonant phonemes, and only 13 remained in Proto-Polynesian: unvoiced and voiced stop consonants that contrasted in Proto-Oceanic merged, only three out of five nasal consonants remained, two more consonants disappeared completely, but at the same time Proto-Polynesian acquired vowel length distinction. Māori retains all five Proto-Oceanic vowels. From a phonotactic standpoint, Proto-Polynesian lost consonant clusters and syllable-final consonants, although their reflexes can still be found: the passive form of the word inu "to drink" is inumia, from *inum + ia. Proto-Polynesian *ʔ and *h disappeared in Māori, while *l and *r became merged into /ɾ/ (the disappearance of /h/ and /l/-/t/ merger are typical innovations that can be found among the Nuclear Polynesian languages, and the disappearance of /ʔ/ is typical for Proto-Central Eastern Polynesian languages.

| Proto-Polynesian | *p | *t | *k | *m | *n | *ŋ | *w | *f | *l | *r | *s | *q | *h |
| Māori | /p/ | /t/ | /k/ | /m/ | /n/ | /ŋ/ | /w/ | /f/, /h/, /w/ | /ɾ/ | | /h/ | – | – |

NB: /w/ is a very rare reflex of *f that is attested in five words as initial *faf- became /wah/, e.g. *fafine > wahine 'woman', *fafa > waha 'mouth'. The same outcome of initial *faf- is also found in other Central Eastern Polynesian languages, e.g. Hawaiian (wahine 'woman', waha 'mouth').

Generally speaking, the Proto-Polynesian *f > /h/ before labialised vowels, but is /f/ initially before non-labialised vowels. Exceptions likely reflect that the merge of *f and *s took considerable time. The /f/ ~ /h/ variation is also seen in dialects: *fea > /fea/ in western dialects of the North Island, but /hea/ in eastern dialects.

Many homophones were formed due to the phonetic inventory shrinking: for example, the word tau ('suitable') and the word tau ('season') go back to Proto-Polynesian *tau and *taqu, respectively. Another consequence of this change is the frequent occurrence of long vowels: Proto-Polynesian *kehe > kē.

One of the many examples of irregular changes that happened in Māori is Proto-Polynesian *lima ('hand') > Māori /riŋa/, although a related word *lima ('five') turned into /rima/ in Māori; another one is a change from Proto-Eastern-Polynesian *aanuanua ('rainbow') > ānuanua in Tahitian while becoming āniwaniwa in Māori.

Māori has many doublets like /raŋo/ = /ŋaro/ (from Proto-Polynesian *laŋo) and /pouaru/ (North Island) = /poueru/ (South Island). Many of them occur due to metathesis, or the rearranging of sounds. In Māori's case metathesis switches adjacent vowels, consonants or syllables; in addition a rare type of metathesis involves sound features instead of segments: in tenga ~ kenakena ('Adam's apple') the consonants' place of articulation changes while retaining nasality; in inohi ~ unahi ('scales') the subject of metathesis is the vowel labialisation, but not the vowel height. Some morphemes have allomorphs: for example, the prefix /ŋaːti/ changes to /ŋaːi/ if it is preceding a word that starts with /t/: /ŋaːti porou/, but /ŋaːi tahu/; the same can be observed for /motu/ ('island'): /moutohoraː/, Moutohora Island.

Māori has undergone several notable sound changes during the last 200 years, most likely under the influence of New Zealand English phonetic system: the sound represented with ⟨wh⟩ changed from [ɸ] to [f], stop consonants /p/, /t/, /k/ acquired aspiration, and /au/ and /ou/ have mostly merged. Linguists studied several recordings of Māori and English speakers of different ages that had been made in the 1940s by the New Zealand Broadcasting Service and concluded that the change indeed took place. As an example, the frequency of four realisations of the phoneme spelt ⟨wh⟩ in an informant born in the 19th century can be found below (individual percentages rounded):

- [ɸ] 50%
- [ʍ] 18%
- [f] 13%
- [h] 20% (Note: ⟨wh⟩ represents /h/ when it precedes /a/, usually in the unstressed prefix whaka-.)

The number of aspirated /p/, /t/, /k/ gradually increased, this change is also evident in recordings of speakers of different age:

- recording from 1947, informant born in 1885: 6% aspirated
- recording from 2001, informant born in 1934: 49% aspirated
- recording from 2001, informant born in 1972: 88% aspirated

== Orthography ==
| | Consonants | | | | | | | | | | Short vowels | | | | | Long vowels | | | | |
|---|---|---|---|---|---|---|---|---|---|---|---|---|---|---|---|---|---|---|---|---|
| Phoneme | /p/ | /t/ | /k/ | /m/ | /n/ | /ŋ/ | /w/ | /f/ | /ɾ/ | /h/ | /a/ | /e/ | /i/ | /o/ | /u/ | /aː/ | /eː/ | /iː/ | /oː/ | /uː/ |
| Orthography | p | t | k | m | n | ng | w | wh | r | h | a | e | i | o | u | ā | ē | ī | ō | ū |

== Regional variations ==
Although modern Māori has largely been standardised around the form that was primarily formerly found in the central North Island, historically regional variations did exist, one of which – Southern Māori – has been revived to a very limited extent. This dialect displays marked phonological variations, notably in the existence of apocope. Several consonants are also changed in this dialect, with /k/ replacing /ŋ/, /w/ replacing /f/, and /l/ used in place of /ɾ/ in some areas.

== See also ==
- New Zealand English phonology

== Bibliography ==
- Bauer, Winfried (1993). Maori. London: Routledge. ISBN 9781134975976.
- Harlow, Ray (2006). Māori, A Linguistic Introduction. Cambridge University Press. ISBN 978-0-521-80861-3.
- Marck, Jeff (2000). Topics in Polynesian languages and culture history (PDF). Pacific Linguistics 504. Canberra: Australian National University.
- Ross, Malcolm (1998). "Proto Oceanic phonology and morphology". In Ross, Malcolm; Pawley, Andrew; Osmond, Meredith (eds.). The lexicon of Proto Oceanic: The culture and environment of ancestral Oceanic society (Volume 1: Material culture) (PDF). Pacific Linguistics C-152. Canberra: Australian National University.
