= Juwal language =

Torricelli language of Papua New Guinea

Juwal
- Muniwara
- Native to: Papua New Guinea
- Region: East Sepik Province
- Ethnicity: 1,400 (2000 census)
- Native speakers: (700 cited 2000)
- Language family: Torricelli: Marienberg; Juwal

Language codes
- ISO 639-3: mwb
- Glottolog: juwa1238
- ELP: Muniwara

Juwal a.k.a. Muniwara is a Torricelli language of Papua New Guinea. Other names are Mambe and Tumara ~ Tumaru. It is spoken in Mambe (3.742098°S 143.710721°E) and Tumeru (3.734925°S 143.715238°E) villages of Turubu Rural LLG, East Sepik Province.
