= Bam Island (Papua New Guinea) =

Volcanic island in Papua New Guinea

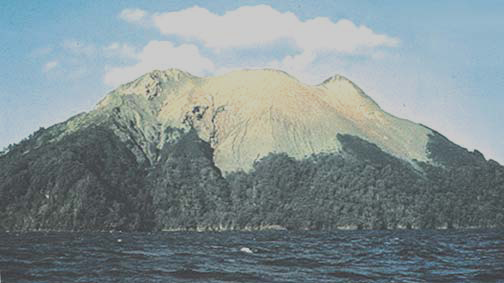
- Bam Island
- Interactive map of Bam Island

Geography
- Coordinates: 3.61°S 144.81°E
- Archipelago: Schouten Islands
- Area: 3.84 km^{2} (1.48 sq mi)

Administration
- Papua New Guinea
- Province: East Sepik

Bam, also known as Biem, is a small volcanic island off the coast of Papua New Guinea (PNG), 40 km (25 mi) north northeast of the Sepik river mouth. It represents the southernmost island of the Schouten Islands. The northern coast of the island is inhabited by a village and coconut groves. Much of the island is forested, except along its south flank. As of 2018, the island has a population of approximately 3,000 people.

== Volcano ==
The island forms the summit of a large submarine stratovolcano. It measures 2.4 km^{2} × 1.6 km^{2} (0.9 sq mi × 0.6 sq mi) in area. With an elevation of 685 meters (2,247 feet), it is the highest of the Schouten Islands.

At the summit is a 300-meter wide (980 ft) and 180-meter deep (590 ft) crater. The volcanic island and its island group forms part of the Bismarck Archipelago of young volcanoes. The first record of an eruption on the island dated back to 1872, which forced its inhabitants to temporarily abandon the island. Although it is one of the most active volcanoes in PNG, eruptions on the island are typically small in explosiveness, which is confined to within the crater. The last recorded eruption of Bam was in 1960. From 2004 to 2005, fumarole activity was observed on the island. Surveys have also revealed two landslide scars along its flanks.

Following an eruption on nearby Kadovar, in January 2018, the Department of Mineral Policy and Geohazards said that volcanic activity on Bam had increased. Photographs supposedly showing an ash plume towering over the island were debunked as thermal features. However, the 3,000 inhabitants of the island were evacuated as a precautionary measure.

== See also ==
- List of volcanoes in Papua New Guinea
