= Urimo language =

Torricelli language spoken in Papua New Guinea

Urimo
- Native to: Papua New Guinea
- Region: East Sepik Province
- Native speakers: 800 (2003)
- Language family: Torricelli: Marienberg; Urimo

Language codes
- ISO 639-3: urx
- Glottolog: urim1251
- ELP: Urimo
- Coordinates: 3.73222°S 143.802665°E

Urimo is a Torricelli language of Papua New Guinea. It is spoken in Yaugiba village (3.73222°S 143.802665°E) of Turubu Rural LLG, East Sepik Province.
