= Marienburg Castle =

Marienburg Castle may refer to:

- Malbork Castle in Poland
- Marienburg Castle (Hanover) in Germany
- Marienburg Castle (Hildesheim) in Germany

== See also ==
- Marienburg (disambiguation)
