= Buna language =

Torricelli language of Papua New Guinea

Buna
- Native to: Papua New Guinea
- Region: Marienberg Rural LLG, East Sepik Province
- Native speakers: 750 (2003)
- Language family: Torricelli: Marienberg; Buna
- Dialects: North Buna; South Buna

Language codes
- ISO 639-3: bvn
- Glottolog: buna1277
- ELP: Buna

Buna is a Torricelli language of Marienberg Rural LLG, East Sepik Province, Papua New Guinea.

There are two divergent dialects. One dialect is spoken in Kasmin (4.018975°S 144.060235°E), Boig (3.84861°S 144.054923°E), Waskurin (3.870089°S 144.068112°E), and Arapang (3.88039°S 144.073217°E) villages, and another in Masan, Mangan (3.953676°S 144.239463°E), and Garien villages.

== Morphology ==
Buna has four noun classes. Noun class concord affixes in Buna are shown in the following examples.

Class 1

singular (masculine)	plural (masculine)
uri gaba-re do-ko-n person.CL1.SG big-CL1.SG CL1.SG.SBJ-go-CL1.SG ‘The big man went.’	oret gaba-bwe bo-ko-m person.CL1.PL big-CL1.PL CL1.PL.SBJ-go-CL1.PL ‘The big men went.’

Class 2

singular (feminine)	plural (feminine)
uri gaba-gwe go-ko-ŋ person.CL2.SG big-CL2.SG CL2.SG.SBJ-go-CL2.SG ‘The big woman went.’	oret gaba-ʔe e-ko person.CL2.PL big-CL2.PL CL2.PL.SBJ-go ‘The big women went.’

Class 3

singular (class III)	plural (class III)
wan gaba-re na-ti-n banana.CL3.SG big-CL3.SG CL3.SG.SBJ-fall-CL3.SG ‘A big banana fell down.’	wan gaba-we u-ti-u banana.CL3.PL big-CL3.PL CL3.PL.SBJ-fall-CL3.PL ‘Big bananas fell down.’

Class 4

singular (class IV)	plural (class IV)
kwala gaba-le li-ti-l netbag.CL4.SG big-CL4.SG CL4.SG.SBJ-fall-CL4.SG ‘A big netbag fell down.’	kwala gaba-be bə-t-əm netbag.CL4.PL big-CL4.PL CL4.PL.SBJ-fall-CL4.PL ‘Some big netbags fell down.’
