= Bungain language =

Torricelli language of Papua New Guinea

Bungain
- Native to: Papua New Guinea
- Region: East Sepik Province
- Native speakers: 3,600, including Forok (2003)
- Language family: Torricelli: Marienberg; Bungain–Forok; Bungain

Language codes
- ISO 639-3: but
- Glottolog: bung1270
- ELP: Bungain
- Coordinates: 3.661359°S 143.800008°E

Bungain is a Torricelli language of Papua New Guinea. It is spoken in Bungain village (3.661359°S 143.800008°E) of Turubu Rural LLG, East Sepik Province.

The Forok "dialect" is a distinct language.
