= Bam language =

Bam language may refer to:

- Biem language (Austronesian)
- Bam, a dialect of the Wantoat language (Papuan)
