= Wiarumus language =

Torricelli language spoken in Papua New Guinea

Wiarumus
- Mandi
- Native to: Papua New Guinea
- Region: East Sepik Province
- Ethnicity: 460 (2000 census)
- Native speakers: (460 cited 2000 census)
- Language family: Torricelli: Marienberg; Wiarumus

Language codes
- ISO 639-3: tua
- Glottolog: wiar1238
- ELP: Wiarumus
- Coordinates: 3.615291°S 143.726763°E

Wiarumus, or Mandi, is a Torricelli language of Papua New Guinea, spoken in a village of just under 500. Only those villagers born before ca. 1940 can speak it. It is spoken in the Mandi village (3.615291°S 143.726763°E), Turubu Rural LLG, East Sepik Province.
