= Wewak Rural LLG =

Local-level government in Papua New Guinea

- Country: Papua New Guinea
- Province: East Sepik Province
- Time zone: UTC+10 (AEST)

Wewak Rural LLG is a local-level government (LLG) of East Sepik Province, Papua New Guinea.

== Wards ==
- 01. Kambagora
- 02. Passam 2
- 03. Passam 1
- 04. Paliama
- 05. Passam 3
- 06. Marik
- 07. Kreer
- 08. Sawarin
- 09. Moem
- 10. Magon
- 12. Simbrangu
- 13. Suambakau
- 14. Hambraure
- 15. Mangrara
- 17. Yarapi
- 19. Numoikim
- 20. Urindogum
- 21. Mengar
- 27. Tangara
- 26. Pangaripma
- 83. Wewak Town
