= Marienberg Hills =

- Location within Papua New Guinea

Geography
- State: Papua New Guinea
- Range coordinates: 3.86667°S 144.01667°E

The Marienberg Hills are a mountain range in East Sepik Province, Papua New Guinea. The Marienberg languages are spoken in the Marienberg Hills.

== See also ==
- Marienberg languages
- Marienberg Rural LLG
- Marienberg, Papua New Guinea
