= Kaiep language =

Kairiru language

Kaiep
- Samap
- Region: Papua New Guinea
- Native speakers: 200 (2007)
- Language family: Austronesian: Malayo-Polynesian; Oceanic; Western Oceanic; Schouten; Kairiru–Manam; Kairiru; Kaiep

Language codes
- ISO 639-3: kbw
- Glottolog: kaie1237
- ELP: Kaiep
- Kaiep is classified as Vulnerable by the UNESCO Atlas of the World's Languages in Danger.

Kaiep is one of three Kairiru languages of Turubu Rural LLG, East Sepik Province, Papua New Guinea. It is spoken in the Kep (3.636947°S 143.802457°E), Taul (3.672792°S 143.825355°E), and Samap (3.737823°S 143.933158°E) village area in Turubu Rural LLG.
