= Sera language =

Austronesian language

Sera
- Native to: Papua New Guinea
- Region: Sandaun Province
- Native speakers: (510 cited 2000 census)
- Language family: Austronesian: Malayo-Polynesian; Oceanic; Western; Schouten; Siau; Sera

Language codes
- ISO 639-3: sry
- Glottolog: sera1260
- ELP: Sera
- Coordinates: 2.967202°S 141.9452°E

Sera (Ssia) is an Austronesian language of coastal Sandaun Province, Papua New Guinea. It is spoken in only one village, namely Sera village (2.967202°S 141.9452°E) of West Aitape Rural LLG, Sandaun Province.
