= Sepa language (Papua New Guinea) =

Oceanic language of northeast New Guinea

Sepa
- Region: Manam Island, Madang Province, Papua New Guinea
- Native speakers: 700 (2003)
- Language family: Austronesian: Malayo-Polynesian; Oceanic; Western Oceanic; Schouten; Kairiru–Manam; Manam; Sepa

Language codes
- ISO 639-3: spe
- Glottolog: sepa1241
- ELP: Sepa (Papua New Guinea)
- Sepa is classified as Vulnerable by the UNESCO Atlas of the World's Languages in Danger.

Sepa is an Oceanic language of northeast New Guinea.
