= Marienburg =

Marienburg may refer to:

== Historical German names ==
- Ordensburg Marienburg (Malbork Castle), a large brick castle built by the Teutonic Knights
  - Malbork, Poland, the site of the Ordensburg Marienburg, formerly Marienburg (Royal Prussia/Crown of the Kingdom of Poland 1466-1772)
- Alūksne, Latvia
- Feldioara, Romania

== Places ==
=== Germany ===
- Marienburg Castle (Ostalbkreis), a castle in Niederalfingen near Aalen, Germany
- Marienburg Castle (Hanover), a castle in Hanover district, residence of the Prince of Hanover
- Marienburg Castle (Hildesheim), a castle in Hildesheim, Lower Saxony
- Köln-Marienburg, a district of Rodenkirchen in the city of Cologne
- A former castle and monastery on the River Moselle
- Marienburg Airport (currently a park), an airport in Nuremberg before the construction of the Nuremberg Airport

=== Elsewhere ===
- Marienburg, Papua New Guinea, a town in the East Sepik province
- Marienburg, Suriname, a village and former sugar plantation
- Malbork, Poland (Marienburg in German)
  - Malbork Castle, a castle in Malbork, Poland
- Aluksne, a town in Latvia – historically named Marienburg in 14 century by Teutonic Order (castle on island in central part was also named Marienburg)

=== Fictional places ===
- Marienburg (Warhammer), a fictional city in the Warhammer Fantasy world

== See also ==
- Siege of Marienburg (disambiguation)
- Treaty of Marienburg
- Marienberg (disambiguation)
- Marienborg, the summer residence of Denmark's Prime Minister
