= Medebur language =

Oceanic language of northeast New Guinea

Medebur
- Native to: Papua New Guinea
- Region: Madang Province
- Native speakers: 510 (2003)
- Language family: Austronesian: Malayo-Polynesian; Oceanic; Western Oceanic; Schouten; Kairiru–Manam; Manam; Medebur

Language codes
- ISO 639-3: mjm
- Glottolog: mede1237

Medebur is an Oceanic language of northeast New Guinea.
