= Marienberg, Papua New Guinea =

Human settlement in East Sepik Province, Papua New Guinea

Marienberg (sometimes misspelled as Marienburg) is a town located near the mouth of the Sepik River in Marienberg Rural LLG, East Sepik Province, Papua New Guinea.

== History ==
In 1913, in what was then German New Guinea, missionaries of the Catholic Society of the Divine Word established a settlement here. It was the first European settlement on the Sepik. The settlement's main industry was milling timber. To facilitate this, one the first railways in the country was built to transport timber from the river to the sawmill. It was drawn by buffalo.

The town was occupied during the Japanese invasion of Papua New Guinea in 1942. Bombing and subsequent re-occupation of the town by Allied forces led to the destruction of the sawmill, houses and church constructed there. These were rebuilt and, by the 1960s the area had a thriving milling business again. Shortly before independence in 1975, labor disputes led to the mismanagement and decline of the business and ultimately all industry ceased there.

== See also ==
- Marienberg Hills
- Marienberg languages
- Marienberg Rural LLG
