= Wogeo language =

Austronesian language spoken in New Guinea

Wogeo
- Region: Vokeo and Koil islands, East Sepik Province, Papua New Guinea
- Native speakers: 1,600 (2003)
- Language family: Austronesian: Malayo-Polynesian; Oceanic; Western Oceanic; Schouten; Kairiru–Manam; Manam; Wogeo

Language codes
- ISO 639-3: woc
- Glottolog: woge1237
- ELP: Wogeo

Wogeo (Vokeo) is an Austronesian language of northeast New Guinea. It is spoken on Koil and Vokeo islands of Wewak Islands Rural LLG.

== Morphophonology ==
=== Consonants ===
	Labial	Coronal	Palatal	Velar
Nasal	m	n	ɲ	ŋ
Stop	b	t d		k g
Fricative	f	s		
Approximant	ʋ	l	j	
Rhotic		r		

=== Vowels ===
	Front	Back
Close	i (Note: /i u/ realized as glides with the posterior vowel: /ɪ̯ ʊ̯/.)	u
Mid	e	o (Note: May be realized as /ʷ/ or /w/ as long as it does not occur on the boundary of two morphemes.)
Open	a	

Words in Wogeo have lexical stress—it creates both lexical and grammatical distinctions, primarily realized through lengthening and changing the quality of the stressed vowel. The accent can be on the penultimate or ultimate syllable, with the penultimate accent considered unmarked. Compare lima [ˈɫ̺ɪːmɐʔ] ‘hand’ with limá [ɫ̺ɪˈmaʔ] ‘his/her hand’.

Vowel assimilation in Wogeo occurs mainly within word forms, with total or partial assimilation of tongue height. Elisions of vowels are morphologically and somewhat lexically determined.

Verbal reduplication in Wogeo expresses imperfective aspect and can take different forms depending on the phonological structure of the verb.

Adjectival reduplication in Wogeo is a common phenomenon, with reduplicated adjectives being more prevalent than non-reduplicated ones. There are also traces of an older adjectival reduplication pattern in certain lexemes, where the reduplication is fully lexicalized, and no longer recognized as such by speakers.

Reduplicated nouns are less common than reduplicated adjectives or verbs, and they serve either to denote 'affiliation/similarity' or to express 'continuous/discrete plurality'. Some proper names also show traces of old reduplication processes.
