= Elepi language =

Torricelli language of Papua New Guinea

Elepi
- Elapi, Samap, Blabla
- Native to: Papua New Guinea
- Region: East Sepik Province
- Native speakers: 330 (2003)
- Language family: Torricelli: Marienberg; Elepi

Language codes
- ISO 639-3: ele
- Glottolog: elep1240
- ELP: Elepi
- Coordinates: 3.737823°S 143.933158°E

Elepi (also Elapi, Samap, Blabla) is a Torricelli language of Papua New Guinea. It is spoken in Samap village (3.737823°S 143.933158°E) of Turubu Rural LLG, East Sepik Province.
