= Ulau-Suain language =

Austronesian language in Papua New Guinea

Ulau
- Suain
- Region: Sandaun Province, Papua New Guinea
- Native speakers: 2,800 (2003)
- Language family: Austronesian: Malayo-Polynesian; Oceanic; Western; Schouten; Siau; Ulau

Language codes
- ISO 639-3: svb
- Glottolog: ulau1237
- ELP: Ulau-Suain

Ulau-Suain is an Austronesian language of coastal Sandaun Province, Papua New Guinea. It is spoken in Ulau 1 (3.302724°S 142.794557°E), Ulau 2 (3.313306°S 142.821106°E), and Suain (3.336895°S 142.919927°E) wards of East Aitape Rural LLG, Sandaun Province.
