= Wewak Islands Rural LLG =

Local-level government in Papua New Guinea

- Country: Papua New Guinea
- Province: East Sepik Province
- Time zone: UTC+10 (AEST)

Wewak Islands Rural LLG is a local-level government (LLG) of East Sepik Province, Papua New Guinea. Various Schouten languages are spoken in this LLG.

== Wards ==
- 01. Biem 1 (Biem language speakers)
- 02. Biem 2 (Biem language speakers)
- 03. Kadowar (Biem language speakers)
- 04. Ruprup 1 (Biem language speakers)
- 05. Ruprup 2 (Biem language speakers)
- 06. Wei (Biem language speakers)
- 07. Koil 1 (Wogeo language speakers)
- 08. Koil 2 (Wogeo language speakers)
- 09. Vokeo 1 (Wogeo language speakers)
- 10. Vokeo 2 (Wogeo language speakers)
- 11. Koragur 1
- 12. Koragur 2
- 13. Shagur
- 14. Rumalal
- 15. Serasen
- 16. Brauniek
- 17. Mushu 1
- 18. Mushu 2
- 19. Walis 1
- 20. Walis 2
- 21. Tarawai
