= Kairiru language =

Language

Kairiru
- Region: East Sepik Province, northern Papua New Guinea
- Native speakers: (3,200 cited 2000 census)
- Language family: Austronesian: Malayo-Polynesian; Oceanic; Western Oceanic; Schouten; Kairiru–Manam; Kairiru; Kairiru

Language codes
- ISO 639-3: kxa
- Glottolog: kair1263
- ELP: Kairiru

Kairiru is one of three Kairiru languages spoken mainly on Kairiru and Mushu islands and in several coastal villages on the mainland between Cape Karawop and Cape Samein near Wewak in East Sepik Province of Papua New Guinea.

== Phonology ==
=== Consonants ===
		Bilabial	Alveolar		Post- alveolar	Velar	Back- velar
Plosive		b	t			k	k̠
Affricate					tʃ		
Fricative	voiceless	ɸ	s		(ʃ)		
Fricative	voiced	β					
Nasal		m	n		ɲ	ŋ	
Lateral			l				
Rhotic			ɾ	r	(ɻ)		
Approximant		w			j		

- The tap /ɾ/ varies freely between [ɾ] or a retroflex [ɻ].
- [ʃ] is heard as an allophone of /tʃ/ among young speakers.
- /b/ is heard as [p] in word-final position.
- /k/ may vary between a voiced [ɡ] or [k] when in between a high and non-high vowel.
- The back-velar /k̠/ may also be heard freely as uvular [q], and may vary between a stop or fricatives [k̠], [x̠] or voiced [ɡ̠], [ɣ̠] when preceded and followed by /a/ or /o/.

=== Vowels ===
	Front	Central	Back
High	i		u
Mid	e	(ə)	o
Low		a	

- Sounds /i, u, e, o/ may have lax allophones as [ɪ, ʊ, ɛ, ɔ] in closed syllables.
- Vowels /e, o/ may have a lax allophone of [ə] when following other vowels.
- /a/ may be heard as [æ] when preceding a velar nasal /ŋ/ in free variation with [a].

== Morphology ==
=== Pronouns and person markers ===
One remarkable feature of the pronoun system of Kairiru is that it appears to have lost the distinction between first-person inclusive and exclusive pronouns throughout its affix paradigms, but then recreated inclusive forms in its independent pronouns by combining first-person and second-person forms along the lines of Tok Pisin yumi (< yu + mi). The inclusive-exclusive distinction is almost universal among Austronesian languages but generally lacking in Papuan languages.

==== Free pronouns ====
Person	Singular	Plural	Dual
1st person inclusive		taqam	tuyieq
1st person exclusive	kyau	qait	tu
2nd person	yieq	qam	qum
3rd person	ei	rri	rru

==== Genitive pronouns ====
Person	Singular	Plural	Dual
1st person inclusive		taqait	taqatu
1st person exclusive	wokyau	tamoit	taqatu
2nd person	yieqayieq	maqam	moqum
3rd person	yaqai	rraqarri	rraqarru

==== Possessive suffixes on inalienable nouns ====
Person	Singular	Plural	Dual
1st person inclusive		-qait	-tu
1st person exclusive	-k	-qait	-tu
2nd person	-m	-qam	-qum
3rd person	-ny	-rri	-rru

==== Subject prefixes on verbs ====
Person	Singular	Plural	Dual
1st person inclusive		ta-	ti-
1st person exclusive	wu-	ta-	ti-
2nd person	qo-	ka-	qu-
3rd person	a-	rra-	rri-

==== Object suffixes on verbs ====
Person	Singular	Plural	Dual
1st person inclusive		-qait	-tu
1st person exclusive	-(ky)au	-qait	-tu
2nd person	-(y)ieq	-qam	-qum
3rd person	-i/-Ø	-rri/-Ø	-rru
