= Manam language =

Kairiru–Manam language

Manam
- Region: Northern New Guinea
- Native speakers: 8,000 (2003)
- Language family: Austronesian: Malayo-Polynesian; Oceanic; Western Oceanic; Schouten; Kairiru–Manam; Manam; Manam

Language codes
- ISO 639-3: mva
- Glottolog: mana1295
- ELP: Manam

Manam is a Kairiru–Manam language spoken mainly on the volcanic Manam Island, northeast of New Guinea.

== Phonology ==
=== Vowels ===
	Front	Central	Back
Close	i		u
Mid	e		o
Open		a	

=== Consonants ===
		Bilabial	Alveolar	Dorsal	Glottal
Nasal		m	n	ŋ	
Plosive	voiceless	p	t	k ~ q ~ ʔ	
Plosive	voiced	b	d	ɡ	
Affricate/ Fricative	voiceless		ts ~ s		
Affricate/ Fricative	voiced		dz ~ z		
Approximant			l		
Vibrant			ɾ ~ r		

=== Allophony ===
Some vowels become glides in diphthongs, e.g. /u/, /o/ > [w] and /i/, /e/ > [j]. /i/ and /u/ are 'weaker' than /e/ and /o/, so that the syllable /kuo/ becomes [kwo] and not *[kuw]

According to Turner, /k/ is more and more often realized as [ʔ], while some older speakers have [q].

=== Syllable structure ===
The Manam syllable is (C)(V_{1})V(V_{1})(C_{1}), the only exception is a syllabic [m̩].

There are some phonotactic restrictions on the prevalent syllable structure. E.g. V_{1} cannot be [a], whereas V must be [a] as long as it is not the syllable's sole vowel. C can be any consonant, whereas C_{1} must be a nasal consonant.

=== Stress ===
Stress is phonemic: /ˈsara/ 'palm tree', /saˈra/ 'seagull'. The stress falls on one of the three last syllables of a word, and stressing the penult syllable is the most common: /ˈnatu/ 'child', /maˈlipi/ 'work'. If the last syllable ends in a nasal consonant, it will be stressed instead: /naˈtum/ 'your child'. Some inflections and affixes do not alter the stress of the root word: /iˈto/ 'he learned' (i- is a 3rd person prefix), /siˈŋabalo/ 'in the bush' (-lo is a locative suffix).

In the orthography, stressed vowels can be underlined in order to avoid ambiguities. Ie. /ˈsara/ ⟨sara⟩ 'palm tree', /saˈra/ ⟨sara⟩ 'seagull'.

== Syntax ==
=== Word order ===
The basic, unmarked word order in Manam is SOV:

tamoata boro i-un-i
man pig 3SG.SUB-hit-3SG.OBJ
'The man hit the pig.'

=== Predicator ===
Lichtenberk defines the predicator as the primary element within a clause. The predicator of a Manam clause can be realised in a variety of different ways, such as verb phrases Ex. (1), noun phrases Ex. (2), postpositional phrases Ex. (3), numbers Ex. (4), etc.

Ex. (1): verb phrase predicator

natu masa ŋa-eno
child INIR 3SG.IRR-sleep
'the child will sleep'

Ex. (2): noun phrase predicator

aine ene i-tui=tui tina-gu
woman over 3SG.IRR-stand-RPL mother-1SG.AD
'the woman who is standing over there is my mother'

Ex. (3): postpositional phrase predicator

tamoata ŋe-ø paŋana-ø patu boʔana
man this-3SG.AD head-3SG.AD stone SIM
'this man's head is like a stone' i.e. 'this man is stubborn as a mule'

Ex. (4): numeral predicator

boro ne-gu wati
pig POSS-1SG.AD four
'I have four pigs' (lit. 'my pigs are four')

=== Negation ===
Negation in Manam is primarily expressed using one of two negative markers: moaʔi and tago. moaʔi is used exclusively in direct speech prohibitions; whilst tago is used for all other cases.

==== Scope of negation ====
The use of tago is primarily categorised by its scope of negation, which further indicates the focus of the clause. The spectrum of scope runs from negating one or more elements within a single clause, to negating an entire clause. The concept of scope of negation can be demonstrated in English: 'I did not go to the party' is an example of a broad scope of negation, i.e. the verb phrase (VP) is negated; therefore, the act of going to the party is negated; 'not one person went to the party' is an example of a narrow scope of negation, i.e. the subject is negated, not the act of going to the party.

==== Broad scope ====
A broad scope of negation is expressed in Manam by negating the predicator—this is done so by placing the negative marker tago before the predicator, as demonstrated in the following examples:

Ex. (5): broad scope negation–1 element

tago u-loŋo
NEG 1SG.REAL-hear
'I did not hear'

Ex. (6): broad scope negation–2 elements

tamoata tago ŋa-te-a
man NEG 3SG.IRR-see-1SG.OBJ
'the man will not see me'

Ex. (7): broad scope negation–3 elements

baʔaraʔa nora tago ʔu-pura?
why yesterday NEG 2SG.REAL-come
'why didn't you come yesterday?'

Additionally, the negative marker tago can also function as a predicator of existential and possessive clauses. Compare the following examples:

Ex. (8): negative existential sentence

ewa tago
fire NEG
'there is no fire'

Ex. (9): negative possessive sentence

mone ne-gu tago
money POSS-1SG NEG
'I have no money'

==== Narrow scope ====
As a general rule, Manam primarily expresses narrow scope negation by placing tago before the element which is being negated i.e. the object of focused negation within the clause.

Ex. (10): narrow scope negation

ŋai tago toʔa-ø di-pura-budu-ru
3SG.IP NEG older.brother-3SG.AD 3PL.REAL-come-together-DL
'he came without his brother'

In example (10), it is not the act of coming that is being negated; rather the negation is narrowly focused in negating the presence of the brother.

Ex. (11): narrow scope negation

tago ara-ø-n-oti i-ʔila-i
NEG name-3SG.AD-BF-INSTR 3SG.REAL-call-3SG.OBJ
'he did not call him by his name' (i.e. he called him not by his name but by some other name)

Similarly, in example (11), it is not the act of calling one's name that is being negated, rather the negation focuses the fact that someone was called, but by some other name that was not their own.

==== Negative quantifiers ====
Additionally, the negative marker tago can be used in conjunction with the quantifiers teʔe 'one' and alu 'some' to produce the negative expressions, tago teʔe 'no, not any' and tago alu 'no, not any'. These expressions function as attributes within the noun phrases that they modify, as seen in the following examples (NP are enclosed within brackets):

Ex. (12): negation using tago teʔe

ŋau [ʔana tago teʔe-ø] u-te-ø
1SG.IP thing NEG one-3SG.AD 1SG.REAL-see-3SG.OBJ
'I did not see anything' (lit. 'I saw not one thing')

Ex. (13): negation using tago teʔe

[tamoata tago teʔe-ø] taun-lo i-laʔo
person NEG one-3SG.AD town-to 3SG.REAL-go
'no one went to town' (lit. 'not one person went to town')

More specifically, tago alu is used to modify noun phrases whose head are mass nouns; tago teʔe comparatively modifies count nouns. Compare the following two examples:

Ex. (14): negative quantifier mass noun

[daŋ tago alu-ø] di-eno
water NEG one-3SG.AD 3PL.REAL-exist
'there is no water' (lit. 'not some water exists')

Ex. (15): negative quantifier count noun

[daŋ tago teʔe-ø] di-eno
water NEG some-3SG.AD 3PL.REAL-exist
'there is no (containerful) of water'

==== Intensified negation ====
Negation in Manam can be intensified by appending the buffer element –na and the intensifier suffix –tina to tago, as seen in the following example:

Ex. (16): intensifier suffix

ŋai tago-ø-na-tina i-pile=pile
3SG.IP NEG-3SG.AD-BF-INT 3SG.REAL-speak-RPL
'he does not speak at all'

The buffer element –na, however, is not included when tago acts as the predicator of a clause, as seen in the following example:

Ex. (17): intensified predicator

ŋau bua tago-tina
1SG.IP betelnut NEG-INT
'I have no betelnuts at all'

Additionally, negation in Manam can be intensified using sesu 'little', as seen in the following example:

Ex. (18): intensifier sesu

tamoata-ŋe tago sesu u-tea=te-ø
man-this NEG little 1SG.REAL-RPL-see-3SG.OBJ
'I don't visit (see) this man at all'

Moreover, sesu 'little' can be used in conjunction with –tina within the same clause, as seen in the following example:

Ex. (19): intensifier sesu + suffix –tina

tago-ø-na-tina sesu di-ra=raŋ-aʔ-idi
NEG-3SG.AD-BF-INT little 3PL.REAL-talk.about-RPL-TRANS-3PL.OBJ
'they do not talk about themselves at all'

Furthermore, the suffix –tina may be appended to the prohibitive marker moaʔi (with the presence of the buffer –na), as seen in the following example:

Ex. (20): suffix –tina + prohibitive marker moaʔi

moaʔi-ø-na-tina niu-be ʔulu ʔu-buiriʔapotaʔ-i
PROH-3SG.AD-BF-INT coconut-and breadfruit 2SG.REAL-mix-3PL.OBJ
'don't mix the coconuts and the breadfruit'

=== Prohibitions ===
Manam expresses prohibitions in two basic ways: using finite verbs—defined as verb (phrase) forms that can occur on their own in a main clause; using gerunds and verbal nouns. Lichtenberk defines gerunds as verb nuclei used to indicate 'non-specific' events, whereas verbal nouns are used to indicate ‘specific’ events. Compare the following examples:

Ex. (21): gerund

udi tano-ø tago u-ʔawa
banana plant-3PL.OBJ NEG 1SG.REAL-know
'I don't know how to plant bananas' (in general)

Ex. (22): verbal noun

udi tanom-a-di tago u-ʔawa
banana plant-NOM-3PL.AD NEG 1SG.REAL-know
'I don't know to plant the bananas' (specific bananas)

==== Prohibitive constructions with finite verbs ====
The basic structure of prohibitive constructions using finite verbs is moaʔi followed by a verb with a realis subject/mood prefix, as seen in the following examples:

Ex. (23): prohibitive construction finite verb

moaʔi ʔu-pereʔ-i
PROH 2SG.REAL-lose-3SG.OBJ
'don't lose it'

Ex. (24): prohibitive construction finite verb w/ subject NP

ŋai moaʔi i-raʔe-i
3SG.IP PROH 3SG.REAL-put.up-3SG.OBJ
'he should not boast' (lit. 'he should not put himself up')

Ex. (25): prohibitive construction finite verb w/ direct object NP

botolo moapesa-di moaʔi ʔu-roʔaʔ-i-ramo
bottle broken-3PL.AD PROH 2SG.REAL-throw-3PL.OBJ-all
'don't throw broken bottles around!'

Sometimes, however—the subject or direct object NP may occur between moaʔi and the verb, as in the following example:

Ex. (26): prohibitive construction finite verb

moaʔi taburi-miŋ di-raya
PROH fear-2PL.AD 3PL.REAL-be.bad
'don't be afraid!' (lit. 'your fear should not be bad')

==== Prohibitive constructions with gerunds and verbal nouns ====
Prohibitive constructions using gerunds or verbal nouns are formed by placing the prohibitive/negative marker moaʔi after the gerund or verbal noun, demonstrated in the following example:

Ex. (27): prohibitive construction using gerund/verbal noun

taŋ moaʔi
cry PROH
'don't cry' / 'we/they/... should not cry'

The distinction between using a gerund or a verbal noun is determined by whether the source verb is transitive (verbal noun) or intransitive (gerund).

Additionally, the form raʔania 'never mind' may also be used in forming prohibitive constructions using gerunds and verbal nouns. The location of raʔania within the clause is more dynamic than the prohibitive/negative marker moaʔi, as raʔania may occur both following or preceding the verbal noun or gerund. Compare the following two examples:

Ex. (28): prohibitive construction using raʔania (following)

misaʔa raʔania
smack.lips never.mind
'stop smacking your lips!'

Ex. (29): prohibitive construction using raʔania (preceding)

raʔania soaʔi-baya
never.mind sit-LIM
'you/we/... should not be just sitting doing nothing'

==== Indirect prohibitive constructions ====
The negative marker tago is used when expressing prohibitions in indirect speech—its behaviour is identical as in its regular usage: tago is placed before the element which is being negated, as seen in the following example:

Ex. (30): indirect prohibitive construction

di tago ga-taga-di ʔana di-ra-ʔama
3PL.RP NEG EXC.IRR-follow-3PL.OBJ PROSP 3PL.REAL-talk.to-EXC.OBJ
'they told us not to follow them' (lit. 'we were/are not going to follow them; they told us')

== Morphology ==
=== Number ===
Manam has an unusual, though regionally common, four-way distinction between singular, dual, paucal, and plural number. Singular and plural are marked on the verb and sometimes on the adjective, but not on the noun.

==== Pronouns ====
Person		Number			
Person		Singular	Dual	Paucal	Plural
1st	Inclusive		kitaru	kitato	kita
1st	Exclusive	ngau nga	keru	keto	keka
2nd		kaiko kai	kamru	kamto	kam kakaming
3rd		ngai	diaru	diato	di

=== Reduplication ===
Reduplication can be either leftward (sa-salaga) or rightward (salaga-laga). There is no point in distinguishing 'partial' and 'total' reduplication, since at most two syllables are reduplicated.

==== Nouns ====
Rightwards reduplicated nouns can either take on a meaning related to the original word, or function as an agentive marker:

moata	snake
moata-moata	worm
malipi	the work
malipi-lipi	worker

==== Adjectives ====
Here are two examples of how number can be marked on the adjective through the different kinds of reduplication:

Rightward reduplication (singular)

udi noka-noka	ripe banana
tamoata bia-bia	the big man

Leftward reduplication (plural)

udi no-noka	ripe bananas
tamoata bi-bia	the big men

=== The verb ===
The verb always marks the subject and the mood; these are fused together. Optional suffixes include such things as object, direction, aspectual markers, benefactive and various kinds of intensifiers and quantifiers. Here is a schematical overview of the Manam verb:

Outer prefixes	Verb nucleus			Outer suffixes
Outer prefixes	Inner prefixes	Root	Inner suffixes	Outer suffixes
Subject/mood marking	Manner prefix aka- transitive	Verb root	-ak- transitive	Object marking Optional suffixes

==== Subject marking ====
The marking of subject is obligatory. In addition to expressing number and person, the pronouns have fused with the mood markers (see below) called realis and irrealis.

Person		Singular		Plural	
Person		Real	Irr	Real	Irr
1st	Inclusive			ta-	
1st	Exclusive	u-	m-	ki-	ga-
2nd		ku-	go-	ka-	kama-
3rd		i-	nga-	di-	da-

==== Mood ====
The realis mood (real) is used for actual events of the past or present, i.e. things that are certain to have happened, things that are "real". Accordingly, the irrealis (irr) mood describes anticipated events in the future, or events that the speaker wishes were real.

ura nga-pura
rain 3SG.IRR-come
'it will rain'

u-noku
1SG.REAL-jump
'I jumped'

nga-pile i-bebe
3SG.IRR-say 3SG.REAL-unable
'he will say that he is unable' (he still hasn't said anything, but when he does, his inability will be stated as actual)

tama-gu i-rere zama go-pura
father-1SG.POSS 3SG.REAL-want tomorrow 2SG.IRR-come
'my father wants you to come tomorrow' (the father's wanting is real, whereas the anticipated coming is still unreal)

==== Manner prefixes ====
Manner prefixes are found between the subject/mood marker and the verb root. The manner prefixes describe in what manner the verb action was done, such as 'biting', 'cutting', 'throwing' etc.

boro u-tara-paka-i
pig 1SG.REAL-spearing-miss-3SG.OBJ
'I speared at the pig but missed it'

==== Object marking ====
Person		Singular	Plural
1st	Inclusive		-kita
1st	Exclusive	-a	-kama
2nd		-(i)ko	-kaming
3rd		-i	-di
3rd		-Ø	

mi-ang-ko
1SG.IRR-give-2SG.OBJ
'I will give (it) to you'

niu u-sing-Ø
coconut 1SG.REAL-drink-3SG.OBJ
'I drank a coconut'

go-ang-kama
2SG.IRR-give-EXCL
'give it to us'

==== Transitivization ====
There are three different morphologically overt methods for turning intransitive verbs into transitive ones:

- The prefix -aka- can occur between the person/mood marker and the verb root.
- The suffix -ka- can occur between the verb root and the outer suffixes.
- The so-called "transitive consonant" (TC) can occur between the verb root and the outer suffixes.

These methods can be combined.

dang i-aka-gita-i
water 3SG.REAL-TRANS-be.hot-3SG.OBJ
'he heated the water'

aka-tukura--ng-ak-i
TRANS-be.short-TC-TRANS-3SG.OBJ
'to shorten it'

==== Optional suffixes ====
The object suffixes are also optional, but rather common. Here are a few examples of some of the more unusual suffix types:

Direction

go-dok-a-mai
2SG.IRR-bring-3SG.OBJ-hither
'bring it here'

Spreading

pipia i-rokaki-ramoi
rubbish 3SG.REAL-throw_away-all_over
'he throws rubbish all over the place'

Intensifying

u-rere-tina
1SG.REAL-like-very
'I like it very much'

Benefactive

go-moasi-n-a
2SG.IRR-sing-BEN-1SG.OBJ
'sing for me'

=== Adjectives ===
Most adjectives are derived by reduplication from a verb or a noun. As seen above, some reduplicated adjectives have a number distinction, but some others do not, e.g. siki-siki 'small' (singular and plural). Some adjectives use the possessive pronouns to mark person and number, e.g. kapisa-Ø 'selfish' (singular) and kapisa-di 'selfish' (plural).

=== Possession ===
As in many other Austronesian languages Manam expresses different degrees of possession. In addition to the most common differentiation between alienable and inalienable possession, Manam uses a particular morphological processes to describe belongings that are edible or associated with eating.

==== Possessive pronouns ====
Person		Number			
Person		Singular	Dual	Paucal	Plural
1st	Inclusive		-da-ru	-da-to	-da
1st	Exclusive	-gu	-ma-i-ru	-ma-i-to	-ma
2nd		-m / -ng	-ming-ru	-ming-to	-ming
3rd		-Ø	-di-a-ru	-di-a-to	-di

==== Inalienable possession ====
In this class are 'belongings' that are involuntary, such as body parts, family members and different kinds of necessary 'parts of a whole'. This class is characterized by simply a possessive suffix attached to the word in question:

mata-gu
eye-1SG.POSS
'my eye'

niu labu-di
coconut base-3PL.POSS
'the bases of the coconut trees'

==== Edible possession ====
In this class are things that are edible and 'used to obtain, prepare or store food'. This class is characterized by the word kana, which is placed after the possessed thing and to which the possessive suffix is attached:

udi kana-gu
banana FOOD-1SG.POSS
'my banana'

==== Alienable possession ====
In this class are belongings that are voluntary; things that one can cease to own, unlike body parts or family. This class is characterized by the word ne, which is placed after the possessed thing and to which the possessive suffix is attached:

kati ne-gu
canoe ALIEN-1SG.POSS
'my canoe'

natu keu ne-di
child dog ALIEN-3PL.POSS
'the children's dogs'

==== Cross-class possession ====
One notable aspect is that the same word can occur in all three possession classes, and then of course its meaning will differ. Here are two examples:

boro-gu	'my pig' (as part of one's wealth)
boro kana-gu	'my pork' (which I am going to eat)
boro ne-gu	'my pig' (which I may or may not eat later)

dang-i-gu	'my water' (or rather 'body fluids')
dang kana-gu	'my water' (to drink)
dang ne-gu	'my water' (to wash with)

=== Demonstratives ===
Manam has two kinds of demonstratives. This two-way system distinguishes between proximal demonstratives, which indicate proximity to a speaker, and distal demonstratives, which indicate distance from a speaker. Both demonstratives occur after the noun phrase. They are formed from the demonstrative marker ŋa, followed by either the proximal suffix -e or the distal marker -ra, followed by either the third-person singular marker -∅ or the third-person plural marker -di as shown in the table below:

	Proximal	Distal
Singular	ŋa-e-∅ DEM-PROX-3SG.AD 'this'	ŋa-ra-∅ DEM-DIST-3SG.AD 'that'
Plural	ŋa-e-di DEM-PROX-3PL.AD 'these'	ŋa-ra-di DEM-DIST-3PL.AD 'those'

Data from WALS suggests that both the Austronesian and Papuan languages, which are geographically close to the Manam language community, show an approximately even distribution of two-way and three-way distinction systems for demonstratives. In fact, despite Ross's observation that "Schouten family members are … much more closely related to each other than to any other members of the [North New Guinea] Linkage", Kairiru, which like Manam is a member of the Schouten family, shows a three-way distinction in its demonstratives. The reconstructed proto language Proto-Oceanic (POc), from which the Schouten family is descended, was determined to have a three-way distinction system. POc's system is believed to have included an additional demonstrative compared to Manam, the medial demonstrative which indicates an intermediate distance, or proximity to the listener rather than the speaker. However, Manam does show the same noun-demonstrative word order which was reconstructed for POc.

In Manam, the proximal form is often contracted from ŋa-e- to ŋe-. It can also be cliticised to a proceeding word when it is not followed by a suffix. Because the 3sg adnominal suffix has a zero form, ŋe- can be cliticised for this construction. This means that Examples (1), (2), and (3) are all acceptable ways to construct 'this woman', while example (4) but not Example (5) is an acceptable construction of 'these women'.

áine ŋa-e-∅
woman DEM-PROX-3SG.AD
'this woman'

áine ŋe-∅
woman DEMPROX-3SG.AD
'this woman'

áine-ŋe
woman-DEMPROX
'this woman'

áine ŋe-di
woman DEMPROX-3PL.AD
'these woman'

*áine-ŋe-di
woman-DEMPROX-3PL.AD
'*these woman'

It is also acceptable to remove the head noun, for instance in the comparative construction in Example (6).

bé?e nára-∅ tágo i-moatúbu ŋa-e-∅ i-moatubu-tína
bag that-3SG.AD NEG 3SG.AD-be.heavy DEM-PROX-3SG.AD 3SG.RL-be.heavy-INT
'This bag is heavier than that one' (lit. 'that bag is not heavy, this one is very heavy')

==== Selective forms of proximal demonstratives ====
A selective form can be derived from the proximal demonstrative (but not the distal demonstrative). It is formed by adding the suffix -ni after the proximal marker and before the adnominal suffix, as per Example (7) below, and indicates selection out of a set or group of options.

tabìra ŋá-e-ni-∅ gó-do?-i
dish DEM-PROX-SEL-3SG.AD 2SG.IR-take-3SG.OBJ
'take this dish (from among several)'

The selective suffix is optional and is used when it is necessary to express selection explicitly. If not, the basic demonstrative can be used.

==== Anaphoric usage ====
Previous examples of the use of the demonstrative in Manam have been exophoric, referring to the world outside of the text. However, they can also be used anaphorically, to reference something previously brought up by a speaker. Although Example (8) below demonstrates that both the proximal and the distal demonstrative can be used anaphorically, the proximal demonstrative is used much more commonly than the distal in this manner.

móare ŋe-∅ bó?ai di-alále ... ?ána ŋa-ra-∅ ?ába di-zalaóno-ø-di
Flower DEMPROX-3SG.AD thus 3PL.IR-go thing DEM-DIST-3SG.AD again 3PL-RL-block path-BEN-3PL.OBJ
'those flowers (mentioned earlier) floated like that... those things (i.e. the flowers) again blocked their way' (lit. 'blocked path on them')

===== Usage of the proximal demonstrative as a resumptive pro-form =====
A second anaphoric use of the proximal demonstrative in Manam is as a resumptive pro-form. In this situation, the proximal demonstrative is used to sum up or resume discussing a topic that has already been spoken about. It can be used in reference to a topic discussed within the same sentence, or in an earlier sentence. When it is used to reference a topic within one sentence, the resumptive pro-form will immediately follow its antecedent as in Example (9).

péra ŋa-ra-∅-na-lo ŋe-∅ tamóata tágo té?e-∅ i-so?óa?i
House DEM-DIST-3SG.AD-BF-in RESPRO-3SG.AD person NEG one-3SG.AD 3SG.IR-live
'nobody lives in that house' or 'as for that house, nobody lives in it'

When the proximal demonstrative is acting as a resumptive pro-form, it usually takes the from ŋe or -ŋe rather than ŋa-e. The singular form is also more common than the plural form. This can be seen in Example (10) where the singular form is used despite the pro-from referring to a group of items.

?àna moarúŋa ?úsi silíŋgisi sakét tràusis páipo móita ási ŋe-∅ ?u-tóa?-i
thing all loincloth t-shirt jacket pants pipe knife bush.knife RESPRO-3SG.AD 2SG.RL-imitate-3SG.OBJ
'(in) everything, loincloths t-shirts, jackets, pants, pipes, knives, bush knives, (in all) this it's her that you imitated'

The resumptive pro-form can be used to reference a clause in order to indicate the time of a second clause, demonstrated by Example (11). It is also commonly used when a noun phrase is modified by a relative clause, as can be seen in Example (12).

u-múle-ŋe píta ábe i-alále
1SG.RL-return-RESPRO P. already 3SG.RL-go
'when i came back, Pita had already left' i.e. 'I came back; at this time Pita had already left'

tamóata áine i-ra=ra-í-ŋe píta tágo i-?awát-a?-i
man woman 3SG.RL-talk.to-RPL-3SG.OBJ-RESPRO P. NEG 3SG.IR-know-TRANS-3SG.OBJ
'Pita does not know the man who is talking to the woman' i.e. 'As for the man who is talking to the woman, Pita does not know him'

It is also often used when a sentence is thematised, and can function similarly to a theme-marker even though it does not meet the requirements to be considered a thematiser. In Example (13) below, ziràpu n-m ('your mattress') is the theme.

zirápu n-m ŋe-∅ fred òno i-en=èno
mattress POSS-2SG.AD RESPRO-3SG.AD F. OBL.PRO 3SG.RL-RPL-sleep
'As for your mattress, Fred sleeps on it.'

== Directional system and spatial deixis ==
Manam, like most Oceanic languages, primarily uses an absolute reference directional system, even on a local scale, (as opposed to many European languages which primarily use relative reference systems). This system is oriented on a land-sea axis. However, Manam's system is unique because it has taken on a circular nature, becoming intrinsically linked to the geography of the island which is almost perfectly circular. Below are the directional terms associated in Manam:

Ilau	'toward the sea'
Auta	'toward the land'
Ata	'to one's right when one is facing the sea'
Awa	'to one's left when one is facing the sea'

This directional system has only been attested in four languages: Manam, Boumaa Fijian, Taba, and Savosavo.

The suffix -lo can be added to any of these terms to indicate movement towards that direction, as in Example (3). No suffix is needed to indicate movement away from a direction – this is inferred from the context of the sentence (contrast Examples (1) and (2) with Example (3)).

áta i-sòa?i
ata 3SG.RL-be.located
'He is in the ata direction'

áwa i-rà?e
awa 3SG.RL-go.up
'He went from awa direction'

aúta-lo i-òro
auta-in 3SG.RL-go.inland
'He went in auta direction'

=== Spatial deixis ===
Spatial deixis describes how speakers can 'point out' the location of an object in relationship to their own position. Manam has two main spatial deictical terms. These are ma?a ('here') and ma?a-ra ('there'). Ma?a-ra is constructed by suffixing the distal marker -ra to ma?a. These two terms are used regardless of which direction the speaker is indicating. If it is necessary to specify direction, this can be done by adding the directional term after the deictical term, as is done in Example (4).

nátu má?ara iláu i-sóa?i
Child there ilau 3SG.RL-be.located
'the child is there (in ilau direction)'

Manam has three additional spatial deixis, which are used to specify spatial relationships in a specific direction. These terms refer to the land-sea directional system described above, and are listed below:

Elau	'over there in ilau direction'
Eta	'over there in auta direction'
Ene	'over there in ata or awa direction'

Interestingly, unlike Manam's two-way distinction for demonstratives, these directional spatial deictical terms show the same three-way distinction that was reconstructed for Proto-Oceanic (POc). To indicate an intermediate distance, the distal suffix -ra can be added to each directional spatial deictic. If the object described is so far away as to be out of sight, the spatial dialectical term can be combined with a directional term to indicate extreme distance. This is illustrated in the table below:

	Least distance	Middle distance	Greatest distance
Ilau direction	Elau	Elaura	Elau + Ilau = Elelau
Auta direction	Eta	Etara	Eta + Auta = Etauta
Ata direction	Ene	Enera	Ene + Ata = Enata
Awa direction	Ene	Enera	Ene + Awa = Enawa

Similar to directional terms, to indicate movement towards the most distant directional spatial dialectical terms, the suffix -lo is added as in Example (5). For the less distant terms, no affix is needed, illustrated by Example (6).

ene-tu?a-tína i-sóa?i
over.there-INT-INT 3SG.RL-be.located
'he is way over there (in ata or awa direction)'

i-alále enáwa-lo ?ába i-múle enáta-lo
3SG.RL-go far.over.there-to again 3SG.RL-return far.over.there-to
'he went long way over there (in awa direction) then (again) went back long way over there (in ata direction)'

== Abbreviations ==
AD	adnominal
BF	buffer
DL	dual
EXC	exclusive
INIR	indefinite irrealis
INSTR	instrumental
INT	intensifier
IP	independent pronoun
IRR	irrealis
LIM	limiter
NEG	negator
NOM	nominaliser
OBJ	object
PL	plural
POSS	possessive
PROH	prohibitive
REAL	realis
RPL	reduplication
SG	singular
SIM	simulative
TRANS	transitiviser

== Resources ==
- Lichtenberk, Frantisek (1983) A grammar of Manam. Oceanic Linguistics Special Publication No. 18. Honolulu, University of Hawaii Press. (Available in JSTOR.)
- Turner, Blaine (1986) A teaching grammar of the Manam language
- Short description of Manam culture
- Paradisec has a number of collections with Manam materials
- Crystal, David (2008) A dictionary of linguistics and phonetics. Hoboken: John Wiley & Sons, Inc.
