= Marienberg Rural LLG =

Local-level government in Papua New Guinea

- Location within Papua New Guinea
- Coordinates: 3.962219°S 144.230859°E
- Country: Papua New Guinea
- Province: East Sepik Province
- Time zone: UTC+10 (AEST)

Marienberg Rural LLG (also Marienberg Hills Rural LLG) is a local-level government (LLG) of East Sepik Province, Papua New Guinea. The Marienberg languages are spoken in this LLG, as well as various Lower Sepik-Ramu languages and the isolate Tayap.

== Wards ==
- 01. Kasmin 2 (Buna language speakers)
- 02. Kasmin 1 (Buna language speakers)
- 03. Mansep
- 04. Ariapan (Buna language speakers)
- 05. Boik (Buna language speakers)
- 06. Kis
- 07. Kaup
- 08. Murik (Nor language speakers)
- 09. Darapap
- 10. Karau
- 11. Mendam
- 12. Bin (Kanda language speakers)
- 13. Suk (Buna language speakers)
- 14. Imbando (Kanda language speakers)
- 15. Mamber (Kakra language speakers)
- 16. Watam (Marangis language speakers)
- 17. Kopar (Kopar language speakers)
- 18. Mabuk
- 19. Gapun (Tayap language speakers)
- 20. Arango
- 21. Ombos
- 22. Ormai
- 23. Jangit
- 24. Manimong
- 25. Murken
- 26. Pokran
- 27. Jeta
- 28. Binam
- 29. Pankin

== See also ==
- Marienberg, Papua New Guinea
- Marienberg Hills
- Marienberg languages
