= Maprik/Wora Rural LLG =

Local-level government in Papua New Guinea

- Location within Papua New Guinea
- Coordinates: 3.627753°S 143.046259°E
- Country: Papua New Guinea
- Province: East Sepik Province
- Time zone: UTC+10 (AEST)

Maprik/Wora Rural LLG is a local-level government (LLG) of East Sepik Province, Papua New Guinea.

== Wards ==
- 01. Klabu 1
- 02. Klabu 2
- 03. Jame
- 04. Niamikum
- 05. Kuminimbis 1
- 06. Kuminimbis 2
- 07. Nagipaim
- 08. Neligum
- 10. Maprik 1
- 11. Kinbangua
- 12. Wora
- 13. Gwelikum 1
- 14. Gatnikum
- 15. Aupik
- 16. Lehinga
- 17. Ningalimbi
- 18. Serakikum
- 82. Maprik Urban

== Bibliography ==
- OCHA FISS (2018). "Papua New Guinea administrative level 0, 1, 2, and 3 population statistics and gazetteer". Humanitarian Data Exchange. 1.31.9.
- United Nations in Papua New Guinea (2018). "Papua New Guinea Village Coordinates Lookup". Humanitarian Data Exchange. 1.31.9.
