= Wewak Urban LLG =

Local-level government in Papua New Guinea

- Country: Papua New Guinea
- Province: East Sepik Province
- Time zone: UTC+10 (AEST)

Wewak Urban LLG is a local-level government (LLG) of East Sepik Province, Papua New Guinea.

== Wards 13 name list ==
- 83. Wewak Town
