= Allophone =

Phone used to pronounce a single phoneme

A simplified procedure to determine whether two sounds represent the same or different phonemes. The cases on the extreme left and the extreme right are those in which the sounds are allophones.

In phonology, an allophone (/ˈæləˌfoʊn/; from Ancient Greek ἄλλος (állos) 'other' and φωνή (phōnḗ) 'voice, sound') is one of multiple possible spoken sounds, or phones, used to pronounce a single phoneme in a particular language. For example, in English, the voiceless plosive [t] (as in stop [ˈstɒp]) and the aspirated form [tʰ] (as in top [ˈtʰɒp]) are allophones for the phoneme /t/, while these two are considered to be different phonemes in some languages such as Central Thai. Similarly, in Spanish, [d] (as in dolor [doˈloɾ]) and [ð] (as in nada [ˈnaða]) are allophones for the phoneme /d/, while these two are considered to be different phonemes in English (as in the difference between dare and there).

The specific allophone selected in a given situation is often predictable from the phonetic context, with such allophones being called positional variants, but some allophones occur in free variation. Replacing a sound by another allophone of the same phoneme usually does not change the meaning of a word, but the result may sound non-native or even unintelligible.

== History of concept ==
The term "allophone" was coined by Benjamin Lee Whorf circa 1929. In doing so, he is thought to have placed a cornerstone in consolidating early phoneme theory. The term was popularized by George L. Trager and Bernard Bloch in a 1941 paper on English phonology and went on to become part of standard usage within the American structuralist tradition.

== Complementary and free-variant allophones ==
Each time a speaker vocalizes a phoneme, they pronounce it differently from previous iterations. There is debate regarding how real and universal phonemes are (see phoneme for details). Only some of the variation is perceptible to listeners speakers.

There are two types of allophones: complementary allophones and free-variant allophones.

Complementary allophones are not interchangeable. If context requires a speaker to use a specific allophone for a given phoneme (that is, using a different allophone would confuse listeners), the possible allophones are said to be complementary. Each allophone from a complementary set is used in a specific phonetic context and may be involved in a phonological process.

Otherwise, allophones are in free variation; speakers choose an allophone by habit or preference.

== Allotone ==
An allotone is a tonic allophone, such as the neutral tone in Standard Mandarin.

== Examples ==
=== English ===
There are many allophonic processes in English: lack of plosion, nasal plosion, partial devoicing of sonorants, complete devoicing of sonorants, partial devoicing of obstruents, lengthening and shortening vowels, and retraction.

- Aspiration: In English, a voiceless plosive /p, t, k/ is aspirated (has a strong explosion of breath) if it is at the beginning of the first or a stressed syllable in a word. For example, [pʰ] as in pin and [p] as in spin are allophones for the phoneme /p/ because they cannot be used to distinguish words (in fact, they occur in complementary distribution). English-speakers treat them as the same sound, but they are different: the first is aspirated and the second is unaspirated (plain). Many languages treat the two phones differently.
- Nasal plosion: In English, a plosive (/p, t, k, b, d, ɡ/) has nasal plosion if it is followed by a nasal, whether within a word or across a word boundary.
- Partial devoicing of sonorants: In English, sonorants (/j, w, l, r, m, n/) are partially devoiced after a voiceless sound in the same syllable.
- Complete devoicing of sonorants: In English, a sonorant is completely devoiced after an aspirated plosive (/p, t, k/).
- Partial devoicing of obstruents: In English, a voiced obstruent is partially devoiced next to a pause or next to a voiceless sound within a word or across a word boundary.
- Retraction: In English, /t, d, n, l/ are retracted before /r/.

Since the choice among allophones is rarely under conscious control, few people realize their existence. English-speakers may be unaware of differences between a number of (dialect-dependent) allophones of the phoneme /t/:

- post-aspirated [tʰ] as in top,
- unaspirated [t] as in stop.
- glottalized (or rather substituted by the glottal stop) [ʔ] as in button, but many speakers preserve at least an unreleased coronal stop [ t̚].

In addition, the following allophones of /t/ are found in (at least) some dialects of American(ized) English;

- flapped [ɾ] as in American English water,
- nasal(ized) flapped [ɾ̃] as in American English winter.
- unreleased [ t̚] as in American English cat, but other dialects preserve the released [t], or substitute the glottal stop [ʔ].

However, speakers may become aware of the differences if – for example – they contrast the pronunciations of the following words:

- Night rate: unreleased [ˈnʌɪt̚.ɹʷeɪt̚] (without a word space between [ . ] and [ɹ])
- Nitrate: aspirated [ˈnaɪ.tʰɹ̥eɪt̚] or retracted [ˈnaɪ.t̠ɹ̠̊˔ʷeɪt̚]

A flame that is held in front of the lips while those words are spoken flickers more for the aspirated nitrate than for the unaspirated night rate. The difference can also be felt by holding the hand in front of the lips. For a Mandarin-speaker, for whom /t/ and /tʰ/ are separate phonemes, the English distinction is much more obvious than for an English-speaker, who has learned since childhood to ignore the distinction.

One may notice the (dialect-dependent) allophones of English /l/ such as the (palatal) alveolar "light" [l] of leaf [ˈliːf] as opposed to the velar alveolar "dark" [ɫ] in feel [ˈfiːɫ] found in the U.S. and Southern England. The difference is much more obvious to a Turkish-speaker, for whom /l/ and /ɫ/ are separate phonemes, than to an English speaker, for whom they are allophones of a single phoneme.

These descriptions are more sequentially broken down in the next section.

==== Rules for English consonant allophones ====
Peter Ladefoged, a renowned phonetician, clearly explains the consonant allophones of English in a precise list of statements to illustrate the language behavior. Some of these rules apply to all the consonants of English; the first item on the list deals with consonant length, items 2 through 18 apply to only selected groups of consonants, and the last item deals with the quality of a consonant. These descriptive rules are as follows:

1. Consonants are longer when they come at the end of a phrase. This can be easily tested by recording a speaker saying a sound like "bib", then comparing the forward and backward playback of the recording. One will find that the backward playback does not sound like the forward playback because the production of what is expected to be the same sound is not identical.
2. Voiceless stops /p, t, k/ are aspirated when they come at the beginning of a syllable, such as in words like "pip, test, kick" [pʰɪp, tʰɛst, kʰɪk]. We can compare this with voiceless stops that are not syllable initial like "stop" [stɑp]. The /t/ voiceless stop follows the /s/ (fricative) here.
3. Voiced obstruents, which include stops and fricatives, such as /b, d, ɡ, v, ð, z, ʒ/, that come at the end of an utterance like /v/ in "improve" or before a voiceless sound like /d/ in "add two") are only briefly voiced during the articulation.
4. Voiced stops and affricates /b, d, ɡ, dʒ/ in fact occur as partially devoiced at the beginning of a syllable unless immediately preceded by a voiced sound, in which the voiced sound carries over.
5. Approximants (in English, these include /w, r, j, l/) are partially devoiced when they occur after syllable-initial /p, t, k/ like in "play, twin, cue" [pʰl̥eɪ, tʰw̥ɪn, kʰj̥u].
6. Voiceless stops /p, t, k/ are not aspirated when following after a syllable initial fricative, such as in the words "spew, stew, skew."
7. Voiceless stops and affricates /p, t, k, tʃ/ are longer than their voiced counterparts /b, d, ɡ, dʒ/ when situated at the end of a syllable. Try comparing "cap" to "cab" or "back" to "bag".
8. When a stop comes before another stop, the explosion of air only follows after the second stop, illustrated in words like "apt" [æp̚t] and "rubbed" [rʌb̚d].
9. Many English accents produce a glottal stop in syllables that end with voiceless stops. Some examples include pronunciations of "tip, pit, kick" [tʰɪʔp, pʰɪʔt, kʰɪʔk].
10. Some accents of English use a glottal stop in place of a /t/ when it comes before an alveolar nasal in the same word (as opposed to in the next word), such as in the word "beaten" [ˈbiːʔn̩].
11. Nasals become syllabic, or their own syllable, only when immediately following an obstruent (as opposed to just any consonant), such as in the words "leaden, chasm" [ˈlɛdn̩, ˈkæzm̩]. Take in comparison "kiln, film"; in most accents of English, the nasals are not syllabic.
12. The lateral /l/, however, is syllabic at the end of the word when immediately following any consonant, like in "paddle, whistle" [ˈpʰædl̩, ˈwɪsl̩].
  1. When considering /r, l/ as liquids, /r/ is included in this rule as well as present in the words "sabre, razor, hammer, tailor" [ˈseɪbɹ̩, ˈreɪzɹ̩, ˈhæmɹ̩, ˈtʰeɪlɹ̩].
13. Alveolar stops become voiced taps when they occur between two vowels, as long as the second vowel is unstressed. Take for instance mainly American English pronunciations like "fatty, data, daddy, many" [ˈfæɾi, ˈdeɪɾə, ˈdæɾi, ˈmɛɾ̃i].
  1. When an alveolar nasal is followed by a stop, the /t/ is lost and a nasal tap occurs, causing "winter" to sound just like "winner" or "panting" to sound just like "panning". In this case, both alveolar stops and alveolar nasal plus stop sequences become voiced taps after two vowels when the second vowel is unstressed. This can vary among speakers, where the rule does not apply to certain words or when speaking at a slower pace.
14. All alveolar consonants assimilate to dentals when occurring before a dental. Take the words "eighth, tenth, wealth". This also applies across word boundaries, for example "at this" [ˈæt̪ ðɪs].
15. Alveolar stops are reduced or omitted when between two consonants. Some examples include "most people" (can be written either as [ˈmoʊs ˈpʰipl̩] or [ˈmoʊst ˈpʰipl̩] with the IPA, where the [t] is inaudible, and "sand paper, grand master", where the [d] is inaudible.
16. A consonant is shortened when it is before an identical consonant, such as in "big game" or "top post".
17. A homorganic voiceless stop may be inserted after a nasal before a voiceless fricative followed by an unstressed vowel in the same word. For example, a bilabial voiceless plosive /p/ can be detected in the word "something" [ˈsʌmpθɪŋ] even though it is orthographically not indicated. This is known as epenthesis. However, the following vowel must be unstressed.
18. Velar stops /k, ɡ/ become more front when the following vowel sound in the same syllable becomes more front. Compare for instance "cap" [kʰæp] vs. "key" [kʲi] and "gap" [ɡæp] vs. "geese" [ɡʲiːs].
19. The lateral /l/ is velarized at the end of a word when it comes after a vowel as well as before a consonant. Compare for example "life" [laɪf] vs. "file" [faɪɫ] or "feeling" [fiːlɪŋ] vs. "feel" [fiːɫ].

=== Other languages ===
There are many examples for allophones in languages other than English. Typically, languages with a small phoneme inventory allow for quite a lot of allophonic variation: examples are Hawaiian and Pirahã. Here are some examples (the links of language names go to the specific article or subsection on the phenomenon):

- Consonant allophones
  - Final devoicing, particularly final-obstruent devoicing: Arapaho, English, Nahuatl, Catalan and many others
  - Voicing of initial consonant
  - Anticipatory assimilation
  - Aspiration changes: Algonquin
  - Frication between vowels: Dahalo
  - Lenition: Manx, Corsican
  - Voicing of clicks: Dahalo
  - Allophones for /b/: Arapaho, Xavante
  - Allophones for /d/: Xavante
  - Allophones for /f/: Bengali
  - Allophones for /j/: Xavante
  - Allophones for /k/: Old Latin, Manam
    - In the earliest Latin inscriptions, the letter Q was used before a rounded vowel (e.g. ⟨EQO⟩ 'ego'), K before /a/ (e.g. ⟨KALENDIS⟩ 'calendis'), and C elsewhere for velar stops. These letters might have been sounded more or less to the degree of /q~k~c/ in their times.
  - Allophones for /pʰ/: Garhwali
  - [ɡ] and [q] as allophones: a number of Arabic dialects
  - [l] and [n] as allophones: Some dialects of Hawaiian, and some of Mandarin (e.g. Southwestern and Lower Yangtze)
  - Allophones for /n/
    - [ŋ]: Finnish, Spanish and many more.
    - wide range of variation in Japanese (as archiphoneme /N/)
  - Allophones for /r/: Bengali, Xavante
  - Allophones for /ɽ/: Bengali
  - Allophones for /s/: Bengali, Taos
  - [t] and [k] as allophones: Hawaiian
  - Allophones for /w/:
    - [v] and [w]: Hindustani, Hawaiian
    - fricative [β] before unrounded vowels: O'odham
  - Allophones for /z/: Bengali
- Vowel allophones
  - [e] and [o] are allophones of /i/ and /u/ in closed final syllables in Malay and Portuguese, while [ɪ] and [ʊ] are allophones of /i/ and /u/ in Indonesian.
  - [ʉ, ʊ, o̞, o] as allophones for short /u/, and [ɨ, ɪ, e̞, e] as allophones for short /i/ in various Arabic dialects (long /uː/, /oː/, /iː/, /eː/ are separate phonemes in most Arabic dialects).
  - Polish
  - Russian
  - Allophones for /i/, /a/ and /u/: Nuxálk
- Vowel/consonant allophones
  - Vowels become glides in diphthongs: Manam

== Representing a phoneme with an allophone ==
Since phonemes are abstractions of speech sounds, not the sounds themselves, they have no direct phonetic transcription. When they are realized without much allophonic variation, a simple broad transcription is used. However, when there are complementary allophones of a phoneme, the allophony becomes significant and things then become more complicated. If only one of the allophones is simple to transcribe, in the sense of not requiring diacritics, that representation is often chosen for the phoneme.

However, there may be several such allophones, or the linguist might prefer greater precision than that allows. In such cases, a common convention is to use the "elsewhere condition" to decide the allophone that stands for the phoneme. The "elsewhere" allophone is the one that remains once the conditions for the others are described by phonological rules.

For example, English has both oral and nasal allophones of its vowels. The pattern is that vowels are nasal only before a nasal consonant in the same syllable; elsewhere, they are oral. Therefore, by the "elsewhere" convention, the oral allophones are considered basic, and nasal vowels in English are considered to be allophones of oral phonemes.

In different cases, an allophone may be chosen to represent its phoneme because it is more common in the languages of the world than the other allophones. This is because it reflects the historical origin of the phoneme, or it gives a more balanced look to a chart of the phonemic inventory.

An alternative, which is commonly used for archiphonemes, is to use a capital letter, such as /N/ for [m], [n], [ŋ].

In rare cases, a linguist may represent phonemes with abstract symbols, such as dingbats, to avoid privileging any particular allophone.

== See also ==
- Allo-
- Allophonic rule
- Allomorph
- Alternation (linguistics)
- Diaphoneme
- List of phonetics topics
