= Kadovar =

Volcanic island in Papua New Guinea

Kadovar Island
- Location within Papua New Guinea

Highest point
- Elevation: 365 m (1,198 ft)
- Coordinates: 3°36′32″S 144°35′18″E

Geography
- Location: Papua New Guinea

Geology
- Rock age: Holocene
- Mountain type: Stratovolcano
- Volcanic arc: western end of the Bismarck volcanic arc
- Last eruption: 2018-ongoing

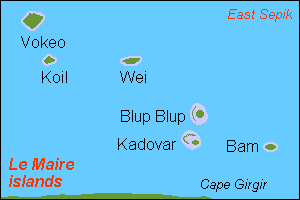

Kadovar is a volcanic island in Papua New Guinea northeast of the much larger island of New Guinea. The volcano erupted in January 2018 and the eruption is ongoing as of 2023, although the activity level is generally considered to be low. There were some heightened thermal phenomena in 1976.

== Geography ==
Kadovar is part of the Schouten Islands about 25 kilometres (15 mi) north of the mouth of the Sepik River. It is 1.5 km (0.9 mi) long and wide. The village of Gewai is near the crater rim. Authorities had thought around 700 people lived on the island, but this number was related to the registered voters on the island and the actual number was found to be much higher during a re-settlement ordered after the volcano erupted in January 2018.

== History ==
The first recorded sighting by Europeans of Kadovar was by the Spanish navigator Yñigo Ortiz de Retez on 21 July 1545 when on board the carrack San Juan trying to return from Tidore to New Spain.

In 1700 smoke was reported, possibly from an eruption. There were further indications of possible imminent eruptions in 1976 and 1981. The island's inhabitants were evacuated to the nearby island of Blup Blup in 1976.

=== 2018 eruption ===
The island was again evacuated by boats and canoes immediately after an eruption began on 5 January 2018 that lasted several days and resulted in at least half of the island being covered in lava. The Rabaul Volcanological Observatory described "mild vulcanian activity from a vent at the southeast base of the cumulodome" and that "a fissure may be opening just inside of the western wall of the vent’s breach, descending down to at least sea level". According to the Australian bureau of the Volcanic Ash Advisory Center in Darwin, the ash cloud formed a plume as high as 7,000 feet (2,100 m).

== See also ==
- List of volcanoes in Papua New Guinea
