= Turubu Rural LLG =

Local-level government in Papua New Guinea

- Location within Papua New Guinea
- Coordinates: 3.658382°S 143.81428°E
- Country: Papua New Guinea
- Province: East Sepik Province
- Time zone: UTC+10 (AEST)

Turubu Rural LLG is a local-level government (LLG) of East Sepik Province, Papua New Guinea. Many Marienberg languages are spoken in this LLG.

== Wards ==
1. Mandi (Wiarumus language speakers)
2. Forok
3. Kep (Terebu language and Kaiep language speakers)
4. Suanum / Munjun
5. Samap (Elepi language and Kaiep language speakers)
6. Ibab/Waibab
7. Tring (Kamasau language speakers)
8. Yaugib (Urimo language speakers)
9. Namarep (kumin paio languages)
10. Kinyare
11. Kandai
12. Mundagai
13. Wawat
14. Yamben
15. Mambe (Juwal language speakers)
16. Bungain (Bungain language speakers)
17. Sinambali
18. Manuwara
19. Sir
20. Putanda
21. Parpur
