= USS Wahoo =

Five submarines of the United States Navy have been named USS Wahoo, named after the fish, may refer to:

- USS Wahoo (SS-238), a Gato-class submarine, commanded by Dudley "Mush" Morton, which became famous during World War II
- USS Wahoo (SS-516), a Tench-class submarine, was assigned the name, but was canceled before her keel was laid down
- USS Wahoo (SS-518), also a Tench-class submarine, was laid down, but she was cancelled before being launched
- USS Wahoo (SS-565), a Tang-class submarine, which served during the Cold War
- USS Wahoo (SSGN-806), a planned Virginia-class submarine
