= Schouten Islands (Papua New Guinea) =

Island group off Eastern New Guinea

Coordinates: 3°14′S 144°05′E

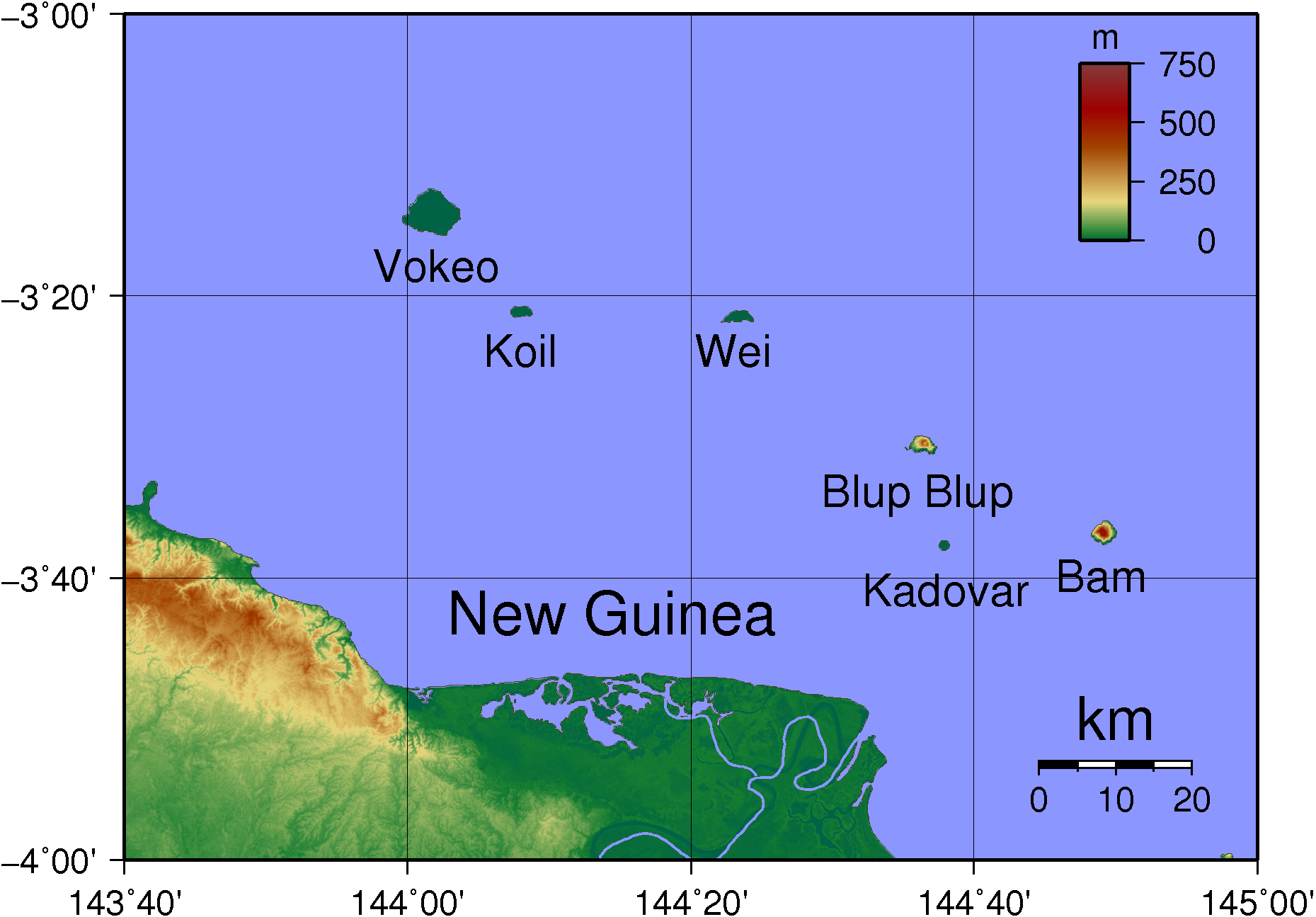
Schouten Islands in Papua New Guinea

The Schouten Islands are a group of six small volcanic islands in the province of East Sepik in Papua New Guinea, north of the island of New Guinea. The group is also called Eastern Schouten Islands or Le Maire Islands to separate it from unrelated Schouten Islands in Indonesian New Guinea. The combined land area is approximately 50 km^{2} (19 sq mi).

The Schouten Islands includes the following islands:

- Bam, also known as Biem Island - active volcano. The most recent eruption occurred 14 January 2018.
- Blup Blup, volcano.
- Kadovar, volcano – possible but unconfirmed eruption c. 1700, and a confirmed one in 2018
- Koil
- Vokeo
- Wei, also known as Vial Island

The first recorded sighting by Europeans of the Eastern Schouten Islands was by the Spanish navigator Iñigo Órtiz de Retes on 21 July 1545 when on board of the carrack San Juan tried to return from Tidore to New Spain. The group is named after Willem Schouten, who visited the island group in 1616, before visiting and giving the same name to the Schouten Islands off the northwest coast of New Guinea, in what is now Indonesia.
