= Wewak =

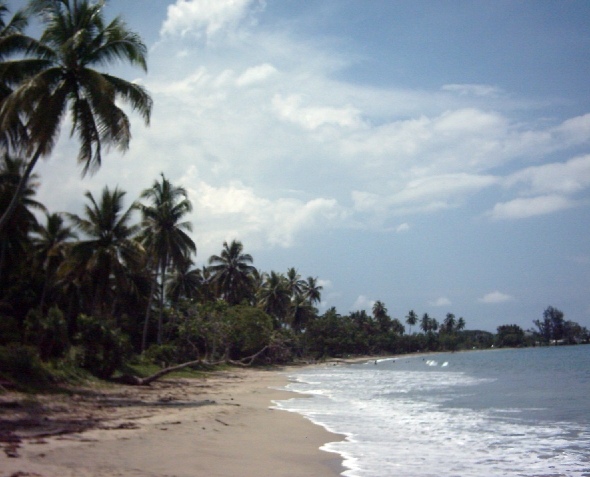
- One of Wewak's beaches

- Location within Papua New Guinea
- Coordinates: 3°33′S 143°38′E
- Country: Papua New Guinea
- Province: East Sepik Province
- District: Wewak District
- LLG: Wewak Urban LLG
- Established: 1919; 107 years ago
- Elevation: 5 m (16 ft)

Population (2000)
  - Total: 25,143
  - Rank: 7th

Languages
  - Main languages: English, Tok Pisin, Kairiru, Boikin
  - Traditional languages: Kairiru
- Time zone: UTC+10 (AEST)
- Location: 260 km (160 mi) from Wuvulu Island
- Mean max temp: 30.8 °C (87.4 °F)
- Mean min temp: 23.8 °C (74.8 °F)
- Climate: Af

Wewak is the capital of the East Sepik province of Papua New Guinea. It is on the northern coast of the island of New Guinea. It is the largest town between Madang and Jayapura. It is the see city (seat) of the Roman Catholic Diocese of Wewak.

== History ==
Between 1943 and 1945, in World War II, Wewak was the site of the largest Japanese airbase in mainland New Guinea. The base was subjected to repeated bombing by Australian and American forces, most notably in one massive attack on 17 August 1943. Directly to the west of the town centre is a peninsula known as Cape Wom, which was the site of the surrender of Japanese forces in New Guinea on 13 September 1945. The site now houses a small memorial. The former Japanese airfield is still in use as the Wewak International Airport. In August 1945 two war crimes trials were held near Wewak for mutilation and cannibalism. First Lieutenant Takehiro Tazaki was convicted and sentenced to death (later commuted to 5 years imprisonment with hard labour) and another accused was acquitted.

== Geography ==
The old centre of the town is on a small peninsula, with the rest of the urban area occupying a narrow band of flat land between the ocean and the coastal range of mountains that emerges a short distance inland.

To the east of the town center is a small peninsula on which is located Boram Hospital, and Wewak International Airport, which is also known as Boram.

Wewak is linked by road to three villages on the Sepik River: Angoram, Timbunke, and Pagwi, though the roads are not always in good condition. Also, a coastal highway extends to the west, linking Wewak with the coastal town of Aitape.

== Climate ==
Köppen-Geiger climate classification system classifies its climate as tropical rainforest (Af).

Climate data for Wewak (1973–2007)
Month	Jan	Feb	Mar	Apr	May	Jun	Jul	Aug	Sep	Oct	Nov	Dec	Year
Mean daily maximum °C (°F)	30.8 (87.4)	30.5 (86.9)	30.7 (87.3)	30.7 (87.3)	31.0 (87.8)	30.8 (87.4)	30.5 (86.9)	30.5 (86.9)	30.8 (87.4)	30.9 (87.6)	31.0 (87.8)	30.8 (87.4)	30.8 (87.3)
Mean daily minimum °C (°F)	24.0 (75.2)	23.8 (74.8)	23.9 (75.0)	24.0 (75.2)	24.1 (75.4)	23.9 (75.0)	23.5 (74.3)	23.5 (74.3)	23.7 (74.7)	23.9 (75.0)	24.0 (75.2)	23.9 (75.0)	23.8 (74.9)
Average rainfall mm (inches)	130.8 (5.15)	124.2 (4.89)	168.8 (6.65)	186.4 (7.34)	220.2 (8.67)	192.2 (7.57)	177.8 (7.00)	141.4 (5.57)	167.2 (6.58)	224.3 (8.83)	188.8 (7.43)	161.0 (6.34)	2,083.1 (82.02)
Average rainy days	16	17	18	19	19	19	17	15	15	18	17	16	206
Source: World Meteorological Organization

Wewak mean sea temperature
Jan	Feb	Mar	Apr	May	Jun	Jul	Aug	Sep	Oct	Nov	Dec
29 °C (84 °F)	29 °C (84 °F)	29 °C (84 °F)	29 °C (84 °F)	29 °C (84 °F)	29 °C (84 °F)	29 °C (84 °F)	29 °C (84 °F)	29 °C (84 °F)	29 °C (84 °F)	29 °C (84 °F)	29 °C (84 °F)

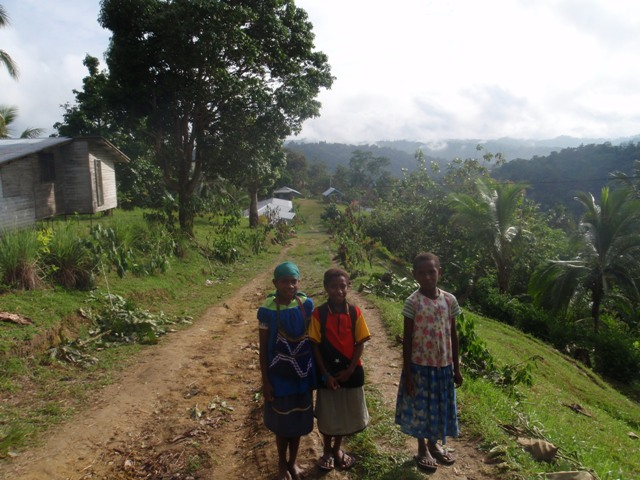
Near Wewak

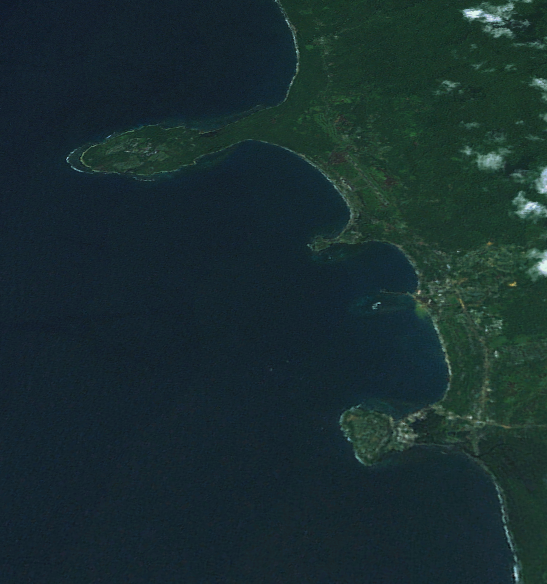
Wewak city centre and coastline from space

== See also ==
- Wewak District
- Wewak Rural LLG
- Wewak Urban LLG
- Wewak Islands Rural LLG
- Wewak Harbour
