= Vial Island =

Volcanic island of Papua New Guinea

- Location within Papua New Guinea

Geography
- Coordinates: 3.389°S 144.407°E

Administration
- Papua New Guinea
- Capital city: Port Moresby
- Largest settlement: Port Moresby
- Prime Minister: James Marape

Vial Island (also known as Wei Island and Jacquinot Island) is a volcanic island in the Schouten Islands of Papua New Guinea.
