= Marienberg languages =

Torricelli language branch of Papua New Guinea

Marienberg
- Marienberg Hills
- Geographic distribution: Marienberg Hills, East Sepik Province, Papua New Guinea
- Linguistic classification: Torricelli: Sepik Coast; Tayap–Marienberg; Marienberg

Language codes
- Glottolog: mari1433
- The Torricelli languages as classified by Foley (2018)

The Marienberg or Marienberg Hills languages are a branch of the Torricelli language family. They are spoken in a mountainous stretch of region located between the towns of Wewak and Angoram in the Marienberg Hills of East Sepik Province, Papua New Guinea.

Kamasau is the best documented Marienberg language.

== Typology ==
Marienberg languages distinguish masculine and feminine genders, with feminine being the default unmarked gender.

Unlike all other Torricelli branches except for the Monumbo languages, word order in the Bogia languages is SOV, likely due to contact with Lower Sepik-Ramu and Sepik languages.

== Languages ==
Foley (2018) provides the following classification, based primarily on morphological evidence.

- Buna, Blabla (Elapi / Samap)
- Kamasau
- Bungain
- Muniwara, Urimo, Mandi (Wiarumus)

There is also Forok, labeled as a variety of Bungain in survey vocabularies.

== Pronouns ==
Pronouns in selected Marienberg Hill languages:

| pronoun | Muniwara | Bungain | Buna |
|---|---|---|---|
| 1SG | ŋa | ŋan | ŋa |
| 2SG | nu | nu | no |
| 3M.SG | na | neŋ | den |
| 3M.SG | wo | veŋ | gwen |
| 1PL | ŋam | ŋaŋ | ŋam |
| 2PL | num | nuŋ | nom |
| 3M.PL | ma | meŋ | bon |
| 3F.PL | kwo | ceŋ | en |
