= East Sepik Province =

Province of Papua New Guinea

East Sepik Province Is Sepik Provins (Tok Pisin)
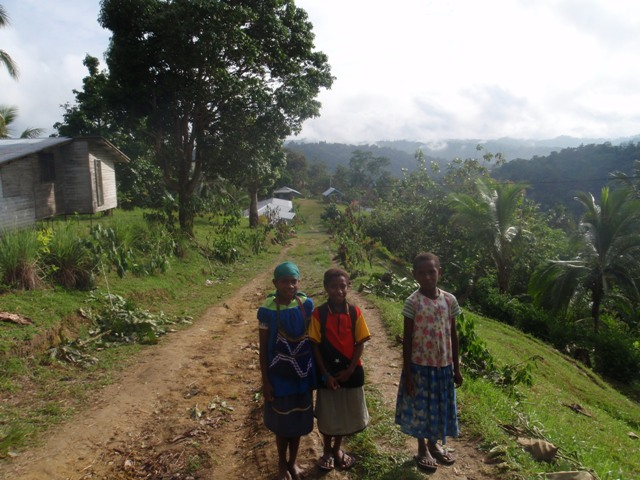
- Near Wewak

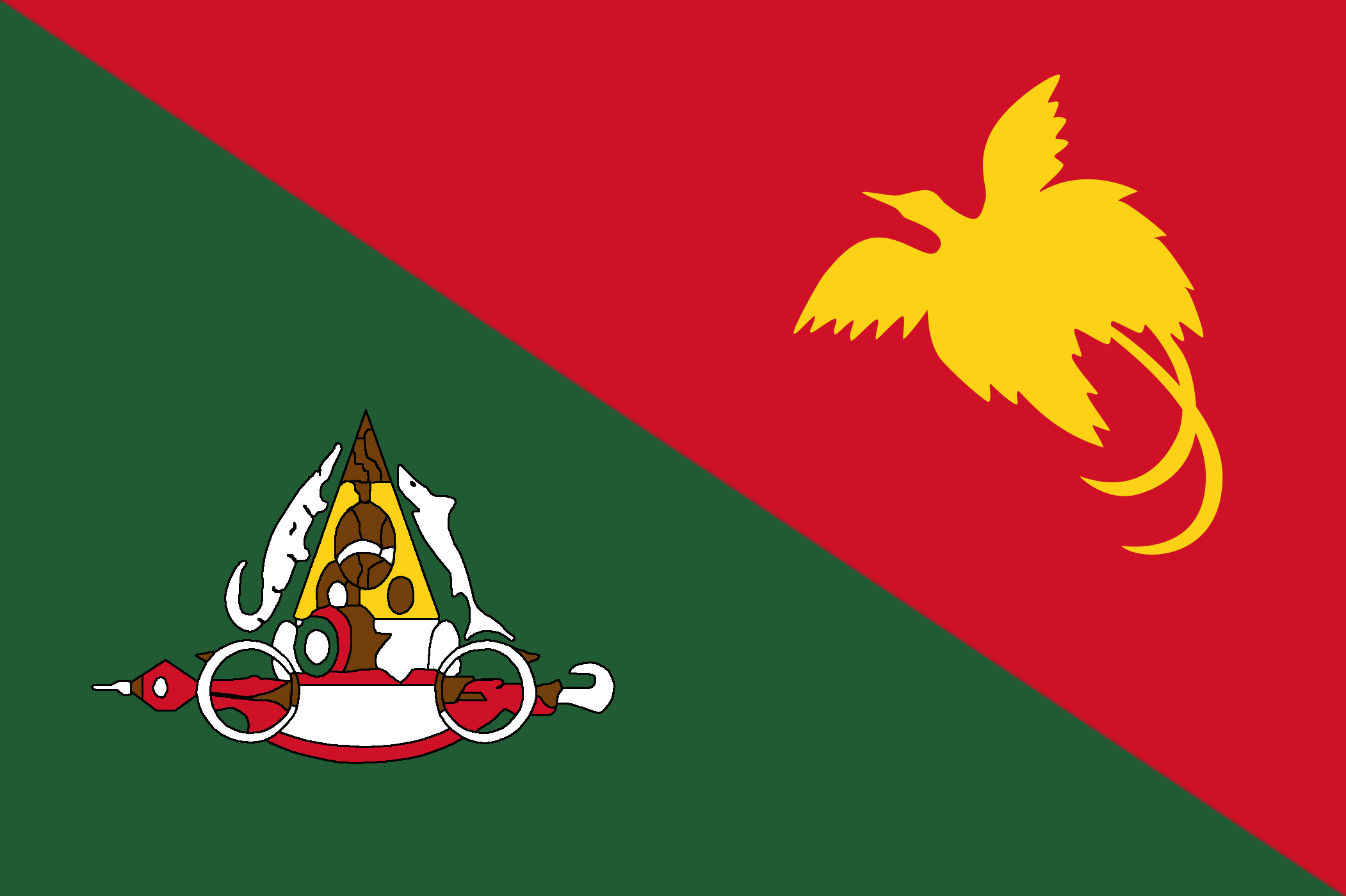
- Flag

- East Sepik Province in Papua New Guinea
- Coordinates: 4°20′S 143°15′E
- Country: Papua New Guinea
- Region: Momase
- Capital: Wewak
- Districts: List: Ambunti-Dreikikir District; Angoram District; Maprik District; Wewak District; Wosera-Gawi District; Yangoru-Saussia District

Government
  - Governor: Allan Bird

Area
  - Total: 43,426 km^{2} (16,767 sq mi)

Population (2024 census)
  - Total: 631,791
  - Density: 14.549/km^{2} (37.681/sq mi)
- Time zone: UTC+10 (AEST)
- HDI (2018): 0.538 low · 16th of 22

East Sepik is a province in Papua New Guinea. Its capital is Wewak. East Sepik has an estimated population of 450,530 people (2011 census) and is 43,426 km square in size. Its density is 10.4 people per square kilometer.

== History ==
Cherubim Dambui was appointed as East Sepik's first premier by Prime Minister Michael Somare upon the creation of the provincial government in 1976. Dambui remained interim premier until 1979, when he became East Sepik's permanent premier with a full term. He remained in office until 1983.

== Geography ==
Wewak, the provincial capital, is located on the coast of East Sepik. There are a scattering of islands off shore, and coastal ranges dominate the landscape just inland of the coast. The remainder of the province's geography is dominated by the Sepik River, which is one of the largest rivers in the world in terms of water flow and is known for flooding—the river's level can alter by as much as five metres in the course of the year as it rises and falls. The southern areas of the province are taken up by the Hunstein Range and other mountain ranges which form the central cordillera and feed the Sepik River.

== Districts and LLGs ==
Each province in Papua New Guinea has one or more districts, and each district has one or more Local Level Government (LLG) areas. For census purposes, the LLG areas are subdivided into wards and those into census units.

District	District Capital	LLG Name
Ambunti-Dreikikier District	Ambunti	Ambunti Rural
Ambunti-Dreikikier District	Ambunti	Tunap-Hunstein Range Rural
Ambunti-Dreikikier District	Ambunti	Gawanga Rural
Ambunti-Dreikikier District	Ambunti	Dreikikier Rural
Angoram District	Angoram	Angoram-Middle Sepik Rural
Angoram District	Angoram	Keram Rural
Angoram District	Angoram	Karawari Rural
Angoram District	Angoram	Marienberg
Angoram District	Angoram	Yuat Rural
Maprik District	Maprik	Albiges-Mablep Rural
Maprik District	Maprik	Bumbita-Muhian Rural
Maprik District	Maprik	Maprik-Wora Rural
Maprik District	Maprik	Yamil-Tamaui Rural
Wewak District	Wewak	Boikin-Dagua Rural
Wewak District	Wewak	Turubu Rural
Wewak District	Wewak	Wewak Islands Rural
Wewak District	Wewak	Wewak Local
Wewak District	Wewak	Wewak Urban
Wosera-Gawi District	Wosera	Burui-Kunai Rural
Wosera-Gawi District	Wosera	Gawi Rural
Wosera-Gawi District	Wosera	North Wosera Rural
Wosera-Gawi District	Wosera	South Wosera Rural
Yangoru-Saussia District	Yangoru	East Yangoru Rural
Yangoru-Saussia District	Yangoru	Numbor Rural
Yangoru-Saussia District	Yangoru	Sausso Rural
Yangoru-Saussia District	Yangoru	West Yangoru Rural

== Provincial leaders ==
The province was governed by a decentralised provincial administration, headed by a Premier, from 1976 to 1995. Following reforms taking effect that year, the national government reassumed some powers, and the role of Premier was replaced by a position of Governor, to be held by the winner of the province-wide seat in the National Parliament of Papua New Guinea.

=== Premiers (1976–1995) ===
Premier	Term
Cherubim Dambui	1976–1983
Jonathan Sengi	1983–1987
Bruce Samban	1987–1991
Provincial government suspended	1991–1993
Alex Anisi	1993–1995

=== Governors (1995–present) ===
Governor	Term
Michael Somare	1995–1999
Arthur Somare	1999–2003
Henry Ariro	2003–2005
Peter Waranaka	2005–2012
Michael Somare	2012-2017
Allan Bird	2017–2022
Allan Bird	2022-present

== Members of the National Parliament ==
The province and each district is represented by a Member of the National Parliament. There is one provincial electorate and each district is an open electorate.

Electorate	Member
East Sepik Provincial	Allan Bird
Ambunti-Dreikikir Open	Johnson Wapunai
Angoram Open	Salio Waipo
Maprik Open	Gabriel Kapris
Wewak Open	Stanley Muts Samban
Wosera-Gaui Open	Joseph Yopyyopy
Yangoru-Saussia Open	Richard Maru

== Bibliography ==
- Hanson, L.W., Allen, B.J., Bourke, R.M. and McCarthy, T.J. (2001). Papua New Guinea Rural Development Handbook. Land Management Group, Research School of Pacific and Asian Studies, The Australian National University, Canberra. Available as a 30 Megabyte PDF.
