= Kombio-Arapeshan languages =

Branch of the Torricelli language family

Kombio-Arapeshan
- Kombio-Arapesh-Urat
- Geographic distribution: East Sepik Province, Papua New Guinea
- Linguistic classification: Torricelli: Kombio-Arapeshan
- Subdivisions: Kombian; Arapesh

Language codes
- Glottolog: komb1276

The Kombio–Arapesh or Kombio-Arapeshan languages constitute a branch of the Torricelli language family according to Donald C. Laycock (1975) and Matthew S. Dryer (2024). William A. Foley (2018) rejects this classification.

== Languages ==
The Kombio-Arapeshan languages are traditionally listed as:

Kombio-Arapeshan

- Kombian languages: Eitiep, Lou, Kombio, Yambes, Aruek, Wom
- Arapeshan languages: Mountain Arapesh (Bukiyip), Southern Arapesh (Muhiang / Mufian), Bumbita (Weri), Abu'

=== Dryer (2024) ===
Matthew Dryer (2024), as cited in Andrey Drinfield (2024), classifies the Kombio–Arapesh languages as follows.

- Kombio–Arapesh
  - Urat
  - Wom
  - Kombioic
    - Yambes
    - Core Kombioic
      - Eitiep
      - Aruek
      - Kombio
      - Aroic: Aro, Mukweym, Orok
  - Arapeshan
    - Bumbita
    - Core Arapeshan
      - Mufian
      - Coast Arapeshan
        - Abu
        - Mountain Arapesh
