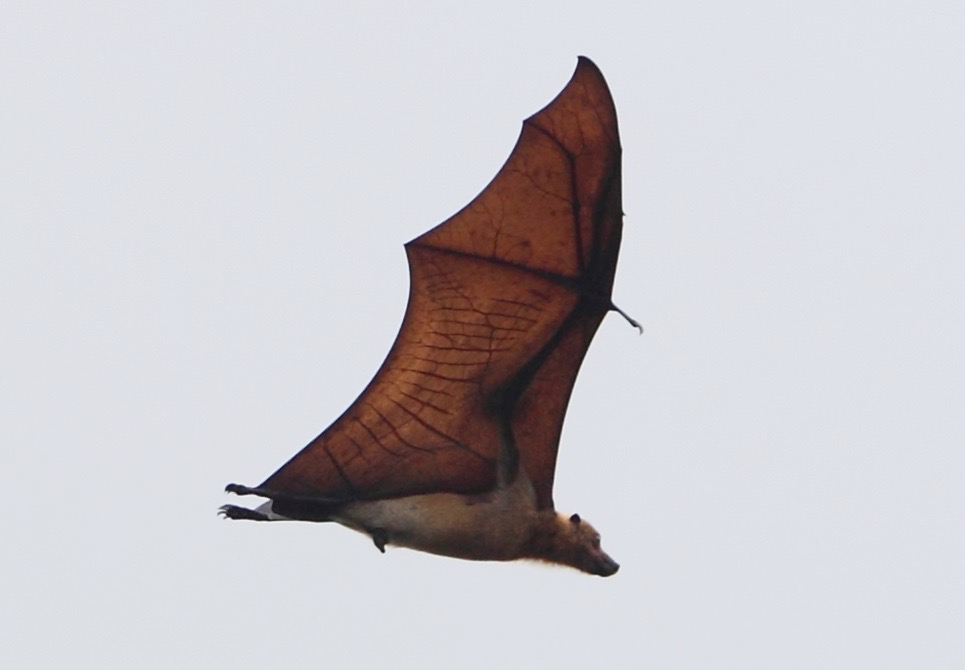
- Great flying fox in flight

Conservation status
- Least Concern (IUCN 3.1)

Scientific classification
- Kingdom: Animalia
- Phylum: Chordata
- Class: Mammalia
- Order: Chiroptera
- Family: Pteropodidae
- Genus: Pteropus
- Species: P. neohibernicus

Binomial name
- Pteropus neohibernicus Peters, 1876
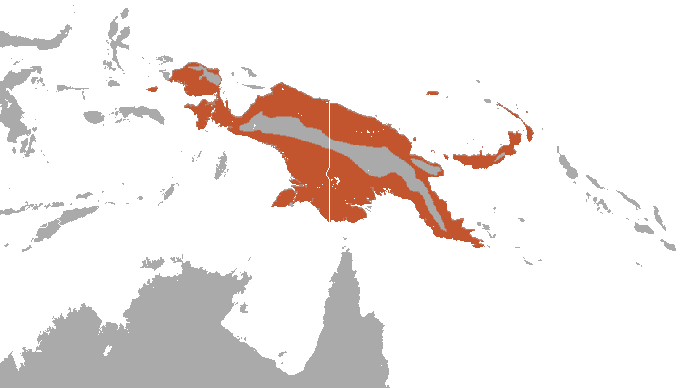
- Great flying fox range

Synonyms
- Pteropus coronatus Thomas 1888; Pteropus degener Peters 1876; Pteropus papuanus Peters & Doria, 1881; Pteropus rufus Ramsay 1891; Pteropus sepikensis Sanborn, 1931

= Great flying fox =

Species of mammal

The great flying fox (Pteropus neohibernicus), also known as the greater flying fox or Bismarck flying fox, is a species of megabat in the genus Pteropus, found throughout lowland areas of New Guinea and in the Bismarck Archipelago. Conflicting evidence suggests that its closest relative is either the spectacled flying fox or, jointly, the Pelew and insular flying foxes. Two subspecies are recognized. At up to 1.6 kg (3.5 lb) in weight, it is among the heaviest bats in the world and the largest bat in Melanesia. It is a gregarious animal which roosts with hundreds or thousands of individuals. In part due to its wide variation in color, it has many taxonomic synonyms, including Pteropus degener, Pteropus papuanus, and Pteropus sepikensis. It may forage during the day or night in search of fruit, including figs or fruits from the family Sapotaceae. It is considered a least-concern species by the IUCN, though its numbers have been negatively impacted by what appeared to be a disease, as well as by hunting for bushmeat that occurs across its range.

== Taxonomy ==
The great flying fox was described in 1876 by German naturalist Wilhelm Peters. He listed it as a variety of the black-bearded flying fox, Pteropus melanopogon var. neohibernicus. The holotype had been collected on the island of New Ireland, which is part of Papua New Guinea, by Carl Hüsker. Neohibernicus is Latin for "of New Ireland". Two subspecies are recognized:

- P. n. hilli Felten, 1961
- P. n. neohibernicus Peters, 1876

The nominate subspecies, P. n. neohibernicus, is found on New Britain and mainland New Guinea, while P. n. hilli is found on the Admiralty Islands.

In part due to its wide variation in color patterns, it has a number of taxonomic synonyms, including Pteropus degener (Peters, 1876), which Irish zoologist George Edward Dobson included as a variety of P. melanopogon in 1878. In the same publication, he maintained P. neohibernicus as another variety of P. melanopogon, as it was initially described in 1876. Danish mammalogist Knud Andersen wrote in 1912 that P. neohibernicus was not a variety of P. melanopogon. He also said that he believed that Peters had the wrong type locality for the specimen he used to describe P. degener. The locality was given as the Aru Islands, but Andersen believed the specimen came from the Bismarck Archipelago. In 1889, British zoologist Oldfield Thomas described Pteropus coronatus from a specimen collected on Mioko Island. However, Andersen noted that it was an immature great flying fox with an unusually pronounced and well-defined T-shaped dark patch of fur on its head, and thus P. coronatus was a synonym of P. neohibernicus. Pteropus papuanus, described in 1881 by Peters and Italian naturalist Giacomo Doria, was maintained as a separate species by Andersen, though he noted that the only real difference between the two taxa was that P. neohibernicus had paler fur on its back. American biologist Colin Campbell Sanborn described P. sepikensis in 1931 from a specimen collected near the Sepik River in northeastern New Guinea. In 1954, British mammalogists Eleanor Mary Ord Laurie and John Edwards Hill published that they considered Pteropus papuanus a subspecies of the great flying fox, Pteropus neohibernicus papuanus, and that P. sepikensis should be tentatively regarded as a subspecies of P. melanopogon. In 1979, American zoologist Karl Koopman published that he found no differences between P. n. papuanus or P. m. sepikensis and P. n. neohibernicus, and thus, both should be regarded as synonyms of P. n. neohibernicus.

Based on a 2019 study, within the genus Pteropus the great flying fox appears most closely related to the spectacled flying fox (P. conspicillatus), based on nuclear DNA. However, on the basis of mitochondrial DNA, it is sister taxon to a clade containing the Pelew flying fox (P. pelewensis) and the insular flying fox (P. tonganus), while the spectacled flying fox is sister to a clade including the Yap flying fox (P. yapensis) and the Admiralty flying fox (P. admiralitatum). The disagreement of nuclear and mitochondrial evidence suggests that the six species may have a complicated evolutionary history. As the great and spectacled flying foxes both occur in New Guinea, for example, hybridization between the two at points in history would muddle their evolutionary relationships. The six species are considered part of the griseus species group within Pteropus, which additionally includes the Ceram fruit bat (P. ocularis), black flying fox (P. alecto), gray flying fox (P. griseus), and the small flying fox (P. hypomelanus).

Relationship of P. neohibernicus to other species based on a 2019 study:
nuclear DNA (left) and nuclear and mitochondrial DNA (right)

- Other Pteropus
- - Pteropus admiralitatum
  - - - Pteropus conspicillatus
      - Pteropus neohibernicus
    - - Pteropus tonganus
      - - Pteropus yapensis
        - Pteropus pelewensis

- Other Pteropus
- - - Pteropus alecto gouldi
    - - Pteropus hypomelanus
      - Pteropus griseus
  - - Pteropus neohibernicus
    - - Pteropus pelewensis
      - Pteropus tonganus

== Description ==
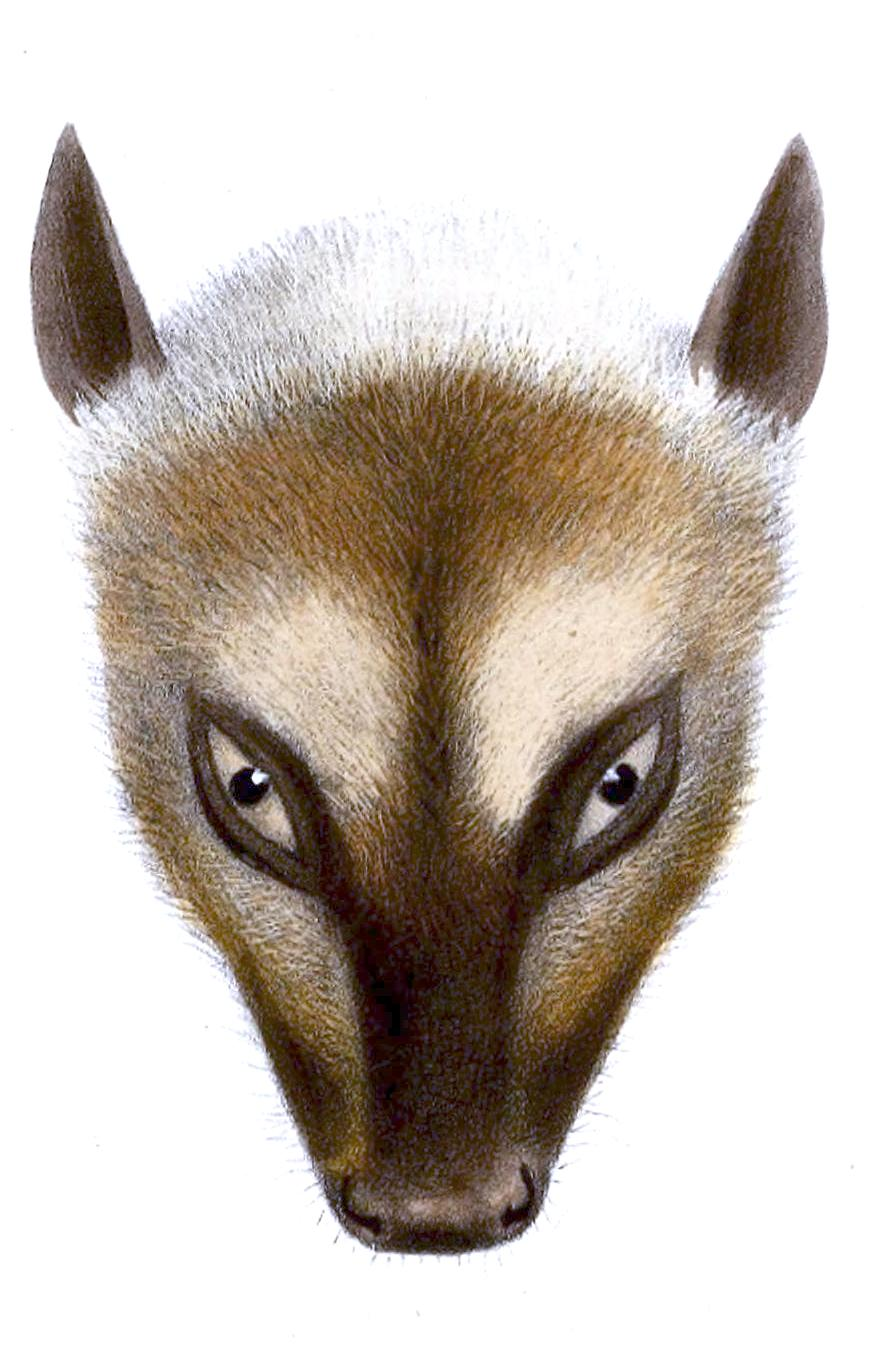
Illustration of the face of the great flying fox

The great flying fox is the largest bat on the island of New Guinea, as well as the whole of Melanesia. Its forearm length ranges from 165–207 mm (6.5–8.1 in), and individuals can weigh up to 1.6 kg (3.5 lb). This makes it one of the heaviest known species of bat. Males are typically larger than females. Males have a head and body length of 266–330 mm (10.5–13.0 in), while females are 234–280 mm (9.2–11.0 in) long. Forearm lengths are 190–207 mm (7.5–8.1 in) and 165–173 mm (6.5–6.8 in) for males and females, respectively. Males also have conspicuously larger canine teeth than females. It lacks a tail, and has a long, narrow snout relative to the black-bearded flying fox. The subspecies P. n. hilli is smaller than P. n. neohibernicus.

The color of its fur is variable, though often golden brown, with the fur of its back usually sparse or absent. The back fur that is present is russet brown, though may be dark or pale brown. The russet brown fur is interspersed with a variable sprinkling of buff-colored (brownish yellow) hairs. Its fur is typically darkest on the sides of its back and rump, as well as on the upper side of its thighs. Fur is lightest in color at the center of its back and rump.

It has a mantle, or fur of contrasting color on the sides and back of its neck. The mantle is usually yellowish, with the top of the head darker than the mantle. The fur of its mantle and belly is longer than the fur of its back, at 11–15 mm (0.43–0.59 in) compared to 5–10 mm (0.20–0.39 in). The darker brown color on the top of its head often extends down the sides of the head and between the eyes, sometimes resembling an indistinct "T"-shape.

== Biology and ecology ==
The great flying fox is highly gregarious, or social, and forms colonies consisting of several thousand individuals. During the day, it roosts in the tops of tall trees, often along the coast. Many roost trees are located near human settlements. At night, it leaves its roost to forage for fruit. Its diet may include fruits from the family Sapotaceae, as well as figs and Ceiba pentandra fruits. It sometimes forages during the day, and has been observed skimming the sea to pluck fruits that are floating on the surface.

Females give birth to a single offspring at a time. Near Fulleborn, Papua New Guinea, it is thought that females give birth in early December. In the Bismarck Archipelago, females with half-grown young have been seen in June. It has been speculated that the sexes may segregate into different roosts in part of the year, similar to the insular flying fox, though this is unconfirmed.

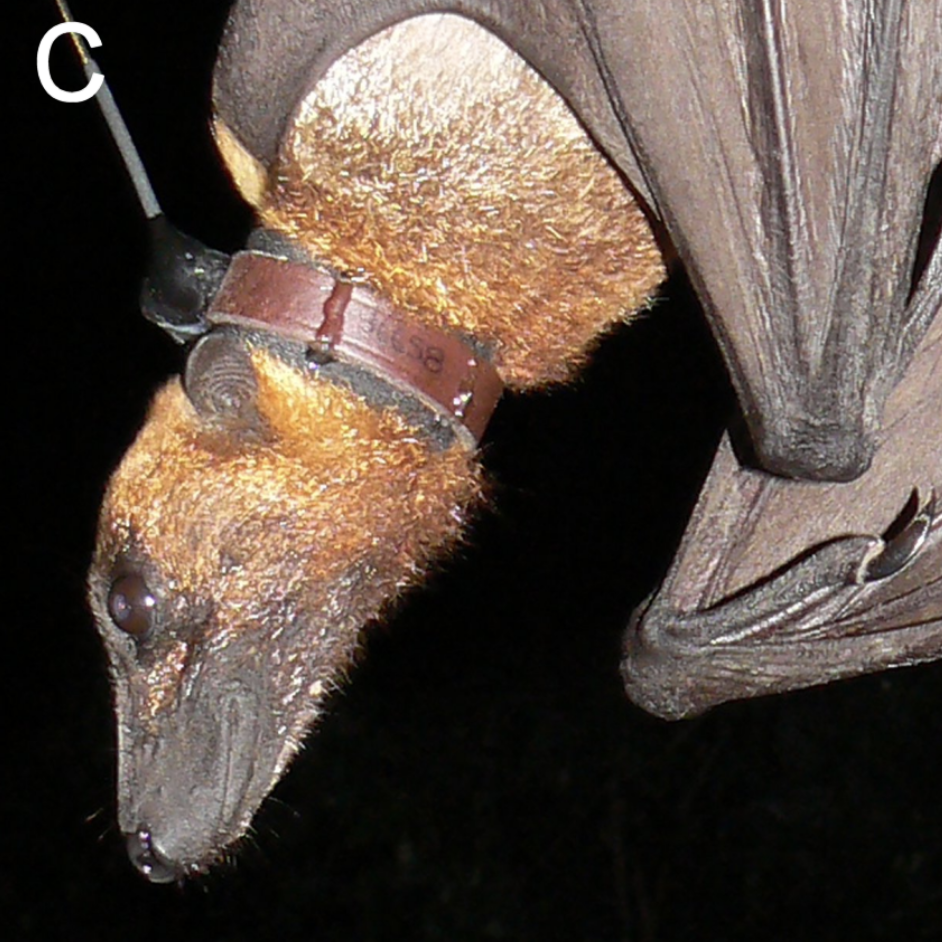
A great flying fox wearing a battery-powered GPS collar

It is known to be parasitized by nematodes of the genus Litomosa, with the species L. hepatica newly described from a great flying fox.

== Range and habitat ==
The great flying fox is endemic to the southwest Pacific islands of New Guinea, the Bismarck Archipelago, and the Raja Ampat Islands, which are part of Indonesia and Papua New Guinea. There is one record of it from the Australian Thursday Island. Its range includes several very small islands such as Karkar Island and Sakar Island. It is unknown why the great flying fox does not occur on nearby larger islands, such as the Louisiade Archipelago and the D'Entrecasteaux Islands.

It has been documented at a range of elevations from 0–1,400 m (0–4,593 ft) above sea level. It is found in forested and savanna habitats.

== Conservation ==
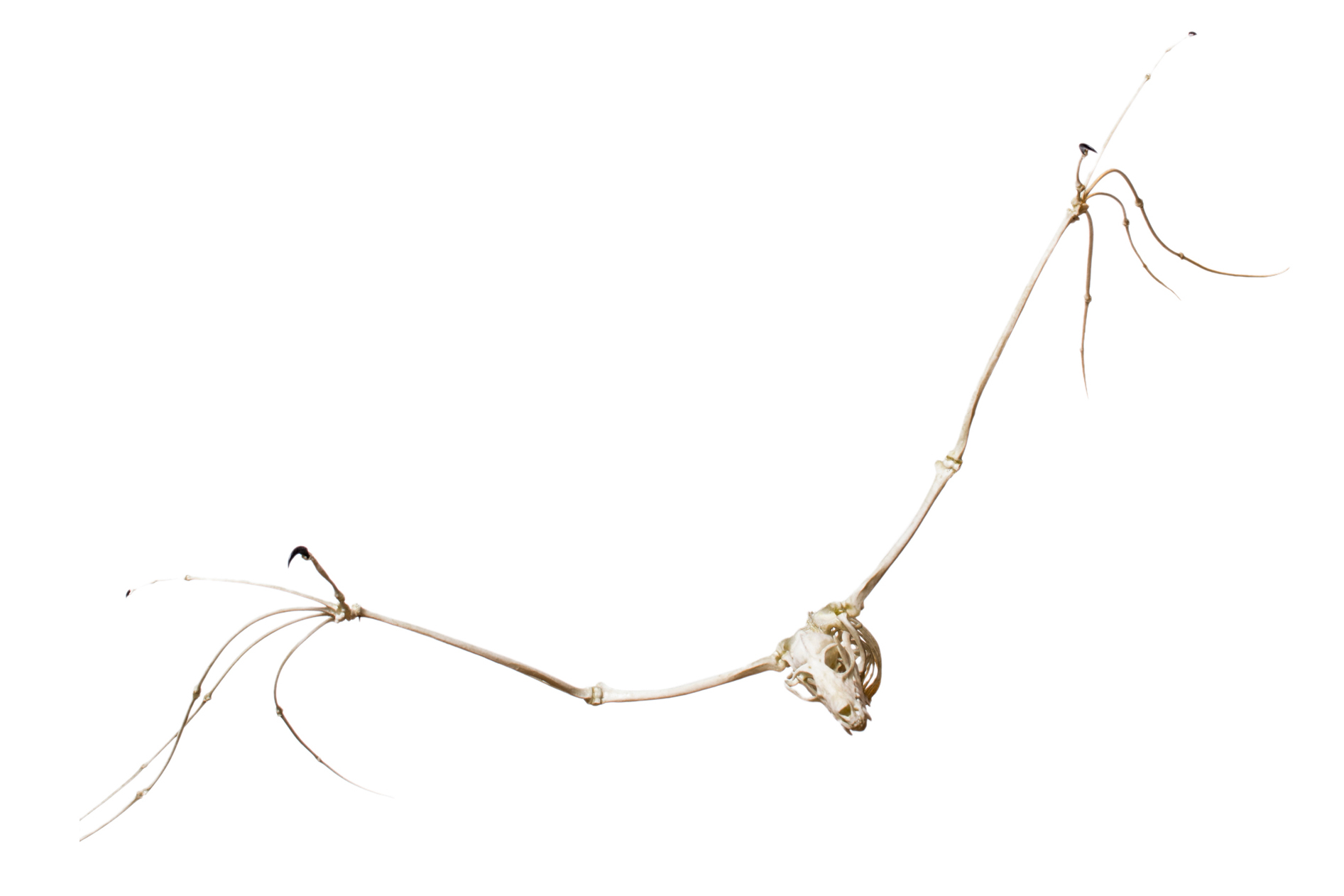
Great flying fox skeleton

The great flying fox may be threatened by disease. In 1985, many dead and dying individuals were found beneath their roosts on the island of Manus. The mass mortality event continued for several weeks across the entirety of the island; afterward, no great flying foxes were seen for several years. Along with many other Pteropus species, it is included in Appendix II of the Convention on International Trade in Endangered Species of Wild Fauna and Flora (CITES). Appendix II is less restrictive of trade than Appendix I, though still indicates that a species may become threatened with extinction unless trade is carefully controlled.

It is considered a common and abundant species, and is listed as least-concern by the IUCN as of 2008. It is unknown if its numbers are increasing, decreasing, or stable.

== Relationship to humans ==
The great flying fox has been researched to determine its role in the ecology of Hendra virus, which is a zoonotic virus that can infect humans. On the north coast of Papua New Guinea, it has tested positive for antibodies against the virus, known as seropositivity. In Papua New Guinea, it is hunted for bushmeat. Localized hunting occurs over a large part of its range, with higher levels in East Sepik Province. A report from 1984 noted that local peoples caught the bats by hand, as well as killed them with arrows.

In the Daribi language, a folklore story includes the great flying fox. The story speaks of a time in which all Daribi men lacked genitals. The men that missed out on acquiring genitals all turned into great flying foxes. It has a variety of local names, including yolan (Olo language), sewio (Mian language), domwane (Daribi), ene (Pawia), and mariboi (Fife Bay).
