= Aro language =

Language of Papua New Guinea

Aro
- Region: Sandaun Province, Papua New Guinea
- Native speakers: 520 (2003)
- Language family: Torricelli: West Torricelli; Kombio-Arapesh; Kombioic; Core Kombioic; Aroic; Aro

Language codes
- ISO 639-3: (covered by tei Torricelli)
- Glottolog: west2579

Aro is a language belonging to the Aroic (or Torricelli) language branch of the Torricelli language family. It is spoken in Sandaun Province, Papua New Guinea. It is closely related to Mukweym and Orok.

== Names ==
The Aro language is most often referred to by native speakers as anjəŋ aro, with anjəŋ meaning 'word' or 'speech' and aro meaning 'no'. It is common for languages in the Sepik region to name themselves after the word for 'no' in their languages. The dialect spoken in the villages of King and Kolembi can be called, anjəŋ arowe, as arowe is a word for 'no' in that dialect. There are two major dialects of Aro:

- anjəŋ səlep 'language of the Selep people', which is spoken in the villages of Selep, Brau, Mup, Fatundu, Wisamol, Afua, and Riworip
- anjəŋ mæləŋ 'language of the Meleng people', which is spoken in the villages of King and Kolembi

Aro villages are administered under two separate wards:

- Kolembi Ward, Palmai Rural LLG, Nuku District, Sandaun Province
- Paup Ward, East Aitape Rural LLG, Aitape-Lumi District, Sandaun Province

== Classification ==
Aro, Mukweym, and Orok are part of the Torricelli language family. While they are closely related and to an extent mutually intelligible, they are considered by native speakers to be distinct languages. Drinfield hypothesizes that they form part of the Kombioic branch of the Kombio-Arapeshan subgroup, along with Eitiep, Aruek, and Kombio.

== Sociolinguistic situation ==
Until recently, it was common for adults in the Aro community to be proficient in many languages, sometimes up to nine. However, with the dominance of Tok Pisin and English in the country, multilingualism has decreased, and more children in the community are growing up speaking Tok Pisin instead of Aro. Around 15-30% of Aro men and 3-6% of women are fluent in English. The language is classified as endangered.

Drinfield (2024) estimates that there are 250–400 fluent speakers of Aro out of an ethnic community of about 1,000 individuals (about half of whom are under the age of 20).

== Phonology ==
Aro has eighteen consonants and nine vowels.

=== Consonants ===
Among the consonants, there is a four-way contrast in place of articulation (labial, alveolar, palatal, and velar) and a two-way contrast in voicing. Voiced plosives are always prenasalized after a sonorant and do not occur in word-final position.

Aro consonants
		Labial	Alveolar	Palatal	Velar
Nasal		m	n	ɲ <ñ>	ŋ
Plosive	voiceless	p	t	c	k
Plosive	voiced	b	d	ɟ <j>	g
Fricative		f	s		
Trill			r		
Approximant			l	j <y>	w

The voiceless unaspirated palatal plosive /c/ can be realized as the voiceless unaspirated palatal affricate [c͡ç]. The palatal nasal usually occurs at syllable onset, and the velar nasal usually appears at syllable codas. /f/ usually occurs at syllable onset.

=== Vowels ===
Aro has nine vowel phonemes. Each vowel has an inherent length, which affects stress placement. /ɨ/ and /ə/, are inherently short, /a/ /i/ and /u/ are inherently medium, and /æ/, /e/, and /ā/ are inherently long.

	Front	Central	Back
Close	i	ɨ	u
(Open)-Mid	ɛː	ə	ɔː
Near-open	æː	ɐ	
Open		aː	

All diphthongs in Aro must have /i/ or /u/ as their second vowel, and any vowel except /u/ or /ā/ as the first vowel.

=== Phonotactics ===
The syllable structure of Aro is (C)(C)V(C)(C). Complex onsets and codas are possible, but only occur with a few select consonant phonemes. Reduplication is sometimes used to indicate verb pluractionality.

=== Stress ===
Stress indicates greater loudness and higher pitch. Syllables can have four different weights on a scale from one to four, with one being the lightest. A weight of one is assigned to syllable with a short vowel nucleus and no consonant coda. A weight of two is assigned to syllable with a short vowel nucleus and consonant coda. A weight of three is assigned to nuclei with a medium duration vowel or a diphthong of a short vowel ending in a glide. Finally, a weight of four is applied to nuclei with a long vowel or a diphthong consisting of a medium or long vowel and a glide.

Stress is generally given to the heaviest syllable of the last two syllables of the word. If the last two syllables are of equal weight, then stress is given to the penultimate syllable. The rightmost syllable of weight one is 'extrametrical' or invisible for stress rules.

== Morphology ==
=== Pronouns ===
Aro has six personal and possessive pronouns:

Aro pronouns
	Personal		Possessive	
	SG	PL	SG	PL
1	æ	apət	əkæ	
2	ik	ip	əkəyk	əkəyp
3	ɨl	fru	kili	fɨkwar

Possessive pronouns occur postnominally.

=== Numerals ===
There are only three numerals in Aro: latən ‘one’, wiyeu ‘two’ and awɨyāl ‘three’. Numbers that are multiples of five are expressed with the expression ədal wobuk 'hand side' and are wobuk 'foot side' or by reduplicating other numerals. For example, seven is ədal wobuk wobuk wiyeu 'hand side side two'. Numerals generally appear post nominally and before the adjective.

=== Demonstratives ===
Demonstratives in Aro have several meanings: the temporal, locative, pronominal, and adnominal ones. There are many demonstratives, some with similar meanings. There is a three-way proximity distinction: proximal, medial, and distal.

=== Prepositions ===
There are five prepositions: ka, similar to English 'of' and denoting possession, ki 'from', kap/kæp/kep 'similar to', nābət 'with', and paləu/pəlau 'about, for'.

ɨjɨk nābət eyŋ ø-arkɨt ø-akwi ø-alp kwæm ñābot
woman with man NON1.PL-run.away.PLACT NON1.PL-go.PLACT NON1.PL-go.toward village Nyambot
The woman and the man ran away to Nyambot village.

=== Conjunctions ===
List of conjunctions in Aro
Conjunction	Gloss	Subjects
wet	'and' (same subject)	clauses
ou	'and' (different subject)	clauses
aro	'but'	clauses
o	'or'	nominal phrases and clauses

=== Nouns ===
In Aro, some nouns can be partially reduplicated in the first syllable to produce another noun. While not a form of plurality marking, this reduplication generally results in an increase in magnitude for the noun, as in fon 'bush/forest', and fəfon 'various forests and gardens surrounding a village'. Only four human nouns mark plurality, these being eyŋ ‘man/husband’, ɨjɨk ‘woman/wife’, bwaygɨp ‘male’, and lanɨŋ ‘child’. Nouns that are not part of this class generally mark plurality by inserting the word ānəŋ after a human noun or mwañəŋ after non-human nouns and a small amount of human nouns. The third-person plural pronoun fru may also be inserted at the beginning of the noun phrase to denote plurality. Semantically plural nouns trigger pluractionality in verbs and plurality in adjectives.

Singular	Plural	Gloss
eyŋ	wādəu	'man/husband'
ɨjɨk	cirkɨp	'woman/wife'
bwaygɨp	pɨgacu	'male'
lanɨŋ	burep	'child'

Kinship terms take on a distinct third-person possessor form separate from their 'default' form. Some, like ɨjɨk/lajɨk 'his wife', appear to derive from the default form, while others, such as mæŋ/laño 'mother', do not appear to share a root with the default form.

=== Verbs ===
There are three verbal prefixes: a detransitivizing prefix, a verbalizing prefix, and a causative prefix. The detransitive prefix t(ə)- can also serve as a reciprocal and rarely reflexive prefix. The prefix a- derives a verb from a noun or adjective, as in ayiprau 'steal' (from yiprau 'thievery'). Finally, the non-productive causative prefix eyg- indicates a transitive variant of an intransitive verb, as in eygarkou 'hang (transitive)' (from arkou 'hang (intransitive)). This prefix most likely derives from the verb ay 'put' and the non-first person singular prefix k(ə)-.

Pluractional in verbs denotes the presence of multiple events, whether by repetition or by the presence of multiple patients/objects. Some verbs in Aro have separate pluractional and non-pluractional stems. This is seen in the verb stems for 'die'.

ɨl ø-kāwɨr
3SG NON1.SG-die.NONPLACT
He/she died.

fru ə-tægər
3PL NON1.PL-die.PLACT
They died.

Verbs are inflected for subject agreement, mood (realis/irrealis), and rarely object agreement. Of these processes, only subject agreement is used productively. The prefix k(ə)- can also express agreement with plural inanimates. Verbs beginning with a velar stop will not take on the k- prefix. The irregular pluractional verb 'go' features the unrelated stems of first person tuki and non-first perso akwi.

Subject agreement in Aro verbs
Person	Singular	Plural
1	m(ə)-	
2	k(ə)-	ə-/ø- (realis), t(ə)- (irrealis)
3	k(ə)-	ə-/ø- (realis), t(ə)- (irrealis)

ən apət m-āmey bwolɨŋ ka ñəmorɨn nau
here 1PL 1-sit.PLACT land of Nyemorin now
Here we live in the land of Nyemorin now.

There are vestiges of an obsolete object agreement system in certain words. It can be seen in certain verbs with object restrictions, like pau (first person), nau (non-first person singular), and wau (plural) 'give'.

Aro vestigial object agreement
Person	Singular	Plural
1	p(ə)-	
2	n(ə)-	w(ə)-
3	n(ə)-	w(ə)-

Around half of verbs change their vowel stem in the irrealis, usually those whose first syllable contains /a/, /ā/, /ə/, or /æ/. There is no way to systemically predict the outcome of this vowel change, but the change vowels tend to occur higher in the mouth. Stems that undergo this change include ayurk > ɨyurk 'go in front', acoley > əcoley 'beat', and nawər > nuwər 'cross a bridge'. The irrealis mood is triggered by negation, the future, the imperative, counterfactual statements, and when following paləu used in the sense of 'for/in order to'.

æ aro m-əkər əkeŋ
1SG NEG 1-see.IRR river
I did not see the river.

=== Adjectives ===
Adjectives are placed postnominally. Only a small amount of adjectives are inflected for plurality. In these cases, the plural number is marked by partial reduplication of the initial consonant or the initial vowel-consonant pair (e.g. mwark 'small' > məmwark 'small.PL', acirk 'old' > acacirk 'old.PL'). Most adjectives encode plurality by full reduplication of the adjective.

m-ārəŋ Warabung mə-kāl ñugələu kətanɨŋ kətanɨŋ
1-sit.PLACT Warabung 1-eat food bad bad
While we stayed in Warabung, we ate bad foods.

== Syntax ==
=== Adjectival phrases ===
Intensifiers are placed immediately after the adjective. Most intensifiers may only be used on specific adjectives, with the exception of əkur, which can theoretically be used as a universal intensifier. However, it is generally not used for this purpose.

In comparative constructions, the preposition paləu is placed after the adjective. isin 'again' may also immediately follow the adjective, making the general structure adjective + isin + paləu + standard of comparison. Superlatives are expressed through comparative construction

lu əden ləlapi isin paləu laŋ
tree this long.PL again PREP that
These trees are taller than those ones

=== Nominal phrases ===
Nominal phrases are head-initial; that is, the head noun is followed by all adjectives, demonstratives, numerals, and some types of possessors. However, optional third-person pronouns marking definiteness and some possessive constructions generally proceed the noun. Phrases produced by speakers generally follow the noun + adjective + numeral + demonstrative sequence.

æ m-akər kārɨp ñumwāl wiyeu əden
1SG 1-see house new two this
I saw these two new houses

Similar to languages like Yapunda, a 'classificatory' noun often precedes a more specific noun, like wuc 'wild animal' in wuc weləu 'tree kangaroo'.

While conjunctive particles exist in Aro, the most common strategy to express conjunction is juxtaposition.

After a noun phrase, the words latən 'only; one' and əkur 'also' can modify the clause.

=== Clauses ===
Aro is a zero-copula language. Adjectival, nominal, possessive, demonstrative, numerical and prepositional clauses need not contain a copula. The existential construction is not marked, but lacks a subject.

kārɨp acər
house empty
The houses were empty

Negation is placed between the subject and the predicate.

Aro is a Subject-Verb-Object language. As such, subjects always precede the verb and non-verbal predicates. Objects may either precede or follow the verb. When they precede the verb, an optional accusative marker -ā is occasionally added. Some 'posture verbs' like 'sit' and 'stand' take locations as an argument. Topicalized arguments may precede the verb.

æ m-əgān m-əgāl eyŋ m-ārəŋ təbau
1SG 1-come 1-take.NONPLACT man 1-sit.NONPLACT Afua
I came and got married in Afua

Adverbs are usually placed after the verb and its complements. Temporal adverbs may occur anywhere in the clause. Instrumentals can be expressed as an argument of the verb ā- 'use'.

=== Tense ===
Aro has four tense particles, used for expressing past and future tense. They are derived from temporal words. Distinctions are made between the 'hodiernal' tenses (occurring within the same day) and 'non-hodiernal' tenses (occurring either before or after the current day)

Tense particles
Tense particle	Gloss	Derivation	Gloss
bwan	non-hodiernal past	kəbwan	yesterday
əgwæu	non-hodiernal future	əgwæu	tomorrow
yak	hodiernal past	yak	earlier today
yək	hodiernal future	yək	later today

Tense particles can occur either immediately before the predicate or clause initially, in circumstances where the subject is not the topic. Particles are usually elided when temporal context has been previously established. Combining bwan with the irrealis mood creates the counterfactual mood.

=== Aspect ===
There are two aspect particles in Aro, these being ka 'imperfective aspect' and sa/save 'habitual particle'. sa/save was borrowed from Tok Pisin

=== Negation ===
The standard negation particle is aro, which triggers the irrealis mood in verbal predicates and is placed between the subject and the verb. In adjectives, the double negator aro ke can negate adjectives. ke never occurs on its own in the language. Finally, the prohibitive marker ka is used to express the prohibitive mood, and always triggers the irrealis mood in verbs.

=== Question particles ===
In polar questions, a and o can be inserted at the end of the clause to denote a polar question. If it is instead a content question, ey can be inserted clause-finally.

It is possible to omit these particles and indicate polar questions with rising intonation. The question may also end in o aro or just aro, expressing a meaning similar to 'or not?'.

In content questions, there are five interrogative words and two interrogative phrases. Interrogative words occur in the same position as the corresponding argument would in a declarative sentence.

Interrogative words
Word	Gloss	Non-interrogative meaning
mənaŋ	who	someone
mon	what	something
paləu mon	why (lit. 'because of what')	
awəl / a	what/where	somewhere
kap awəl / kep awəl / kap a / kep a	how (lit. 'like what')	
awadən	how many	some/several
kawəna / kiwɨna	when	

The non-interrogative meanings can be triggered by the addition of the particle əm or aŋ.

== See also ==
- Aroic languages
- Kombio language
- Languages of Papua New Guinea

== Bibliography ==
- Drinfield, Andrey (2024). A grammar of Aro, a Torricelli language of Papua New Guinea (PhD dissertation thesis). University at Buffalo, the State University of New York.
