= Wapei =

Wapei may refer to:

== Languages ==
- Wapei languages
- West Wapei languages
- Wapei–Palei languages

== Places ==
- West Wapei Rural LLG in Sandaun Province, Papua New Guinea
- East Wapei Rural LLG in Sandaun Province, Papua New Guinea
