= Palei languages =

Branch of the Torricelli language

Palei
- Geographic distribution: eastern Sandaun Province, Papua New Guinea
- Linguistic classification: Torricelli: Wapei–Palei; Palei

Language codes
- Glottolog: nucl1722 Nuclear Palai wana1269 Wanap west2788 West Palai
- The Torricelli languages as classified by Foley (2018). Palei and Wapei languages are yellow.

The Palei languages constitute a branch of the Torricelli language family according to Laycock (1975) (quoted from Foley 2018). They are spoken in mountainous regions of eastern Sandaun Province, Papua New Guinea.

== Languages ==
Languages are:

- Palai
  - Nuclear Palai
    - Braget, Amol (Aru), Srenge (Aruop)
    - Aiku (Yangum), Ambrak
  - West Palai
    - Agi, Yeri (Yapunda) [perhaps a Wapei language]
    - ? Walman [perhaps a Wapei language]
  - ? Kayik (Wanap)

Nambi (Nabi) = Metan may also belong here, or may be one of the Maimai languages, or separate within the Torricelli languages.

== Pronouns ==
Pronouns in Palei languages are:

Palei pronouns
| | Kayik | Aru | Aruop | Aiku | Nambi |
|---|---|---|---|---|---|
| 1s | kəmex | au | am | wup | ai |
| 2s | kiyox | i | yi | yit | yi |
| 3s | təno | | din | tuwun | |
| 1p | kupox | amən | mendi | miyan | ep |
| 2p | kinox | yi | yimi | yip | yip |
| 3p | təmo | may | dim | ti | rəm |

== Vocabulary comparison ==
The following basic vocabulary words are from Laycock (1968), as cited in the Trans-New Guinea database. Nabi words are from Laycock (1968) and Voorhoeve (1971, 1975).

The words cited constitute translation equivalents, whether they are cognate (e.g. yimunə, yimukun for “louse”) or not (e.g. muᶇkwalnta, yaŋkole for “ear”).

| gloss | Agi | Aruop | Amol | Nabi | Wanap | Yangum Mon |
|---|---|---|---|---|---|---|
| head | paikwa | wantu | | wotuf | peləf | wah |
| ear | muᶇkwalnta | yaŋkole | taŋkən | kik | nuŋkul | yiŋkuːl |
| eye | juwol | yolta | nəmalal | nampəkat | yilp | yilkŋum |
| nose | tuwarka | mup | mipan | minif | təlom | yimwar |
| tooth | nai | na | owayen | naf | nef | awak |
| tongue | naliya | aləta | akaŋ | wulaf | kəːləp | yalip |
| leg | safiel | ala | aŋ | tip | kelfek | rak |
| louse | watokəl | yimunə | yimukun | kakyerk | yiməl | yimul |
| dog | nəmpo | yimpa | yimpan | pat | yimpa | yimpak |
| pig | | | | bene | | mandaw |
| bird | nol | ali | alin | napet | kal | al |
| egg | nəŋkoi | yoltə | yinalən | ponorire; yufəlip | yiplop | yulp |
| blood | xaməŋka | səna | səneimpən | amk | komkok | yuwanip |
| bone | kamənaŋkil | pəniŋki | lapən | lə | lekəl | yiklia |
| skin | jiwota | wiye | yakən | wiyírk | saf | yikisiw |
| breast | nəmai | yimá | yimawoŋ | nəmap | yimaŋkəf | yimán |
| tree | numwol | nəmpə | nimpən | nip | nimp | nim |
| man | kamwol | makenti | maikən | məsəmiyen | nyiŋkilpən | almias |
| woman | wukora | simi | asək | ri | kekəntə | wasi |
| sun | wota | wa | wan | waf | kentief | təkŋan |
| moon | uni | anyə | ayen | wunɨ | keːnyif | mərəŋkil |
| water | wul | suku | səpən | sup; wer | kuː | sulp |
| fire | ni | yimpu | niŋ | nɨ; wetai | nif | niw |
| stone | | atauka | səmpeiken | et; rubukia | kipru | pikiyap |
| one | | | | eso | | |
| two | piyami | piya | nantiyou | mantio; ru | poyomp | piyak |
