= Ngaimbom language =

Torricelli language spoken in Papua New Guinea

Ngaimbom
- Native to: Papua New Guinea
- Region: Bogia District, Madang Province
- Language family: Torricelli – Sepik Coast: Sepik Coast; Monumbo; Ngaimbom–Lilau; Ngaimbom

Language codes
- ISO 639-3: None (mis)

Ngaimbom is a Papuan language of Papua New Guinea, closely related to Lilau and Monumbo.
