= Aroic languages =

Branch of the Torricelli language family

Aroic
- Torricelli
- Geographic distribution: Sandaun Province, Papua New Guinea
- Linguistic classification: Torricelli: West Torricelli; Kombio-Arapesh; Kombioic; Core Kombioic; Aroic
- Subdivisions: Aro; Mukweym; Orok

Language codes
- ISO 639-3: tei
- Glottolog: torr1259
- ELP: Lou
- The Torricelli languages as classified by Foley (2018)

The Aroic languages, also known as Aro–Mukweym–Orok or the Torricelli language, constitute a branch of the Torricelli language family. The Aroic languages, which consist of Aro, Mukweym, and Orok, are spoken in Sandaun Province, Papua New Guinea.

== Names ==
Formerly known as the Torricelli language, Drinfield (2024) considers this to be a group of closely related languages rather than as a single language. Since Torricelli is an exonym that is often unknown by the speakers themselves, Aroic (named after one of the languages, Aro) is considered to be a more suitable name by Drinfield (2024).

== Languages ==
Drinfield (2024) lists three languages.

Aro, Mukweym, Orok

== Classification ==
Aro, Mukweym, and Orok are part of the Torricelli language family. While they are closely related and to an extent mutually intelligible, they are considered by native speakers to be distinct languages. Drinfield hypothesizes that they form part of the Kombioic branch of the Kombio-Arapeshan subgroup, along with Eitiep, Aruek, and Kombio.
