= Maimai =

Maimai may refer to:

== People ==
- Mai Hagiwara (born 1996), member of °C-ute
- Mai Oshima (born 1987), Japanese singer
- Mai-Mai Sze (1909–1992), painter and writer, translator of the Jieziyuan Huazhuan into English

== Languages ==
- Maimai languages, spoken in northern Papua New Guinea
- Maay Maay, or Mai-Mai, a language spoken in Somalia, Ethiopia, and Kenya

== Other uses ==
- Mai-Mai, a type of militia in the Democratic Republic of the Congo
- Maimai (video game series), a rhythm arcade game series by Sega
- Maimai Wanwan Rural LLG, a local-level government area of Sandaun Province, Papua New Guinea
- Saleen Maimai, an electric city car sold by Saleen
- Maimai or mai-mai, a type of blind or hide used for wildfowl hunting in New Zealand (see Mia-mia below)
- HMNZS Maimai, a minesweeper of the Royal New Zealand Navy

== See also ==
- Mahi-mahi, a fish species
- Mia-mia, a temporary shelter
- Miami, a city in Florida
- Mama (disambiguation)
- Meow Meow (disambiguation)
