= Kombian languages =

Branch of the Torricelli language family

Kombian
- Kombioic
- Geographic distribution: Papua New Guinea
- Linguistic classification: Torricelli: West Torricelli; Kombio-Arapesh; Kombian
- Subdivisions: Yambes; Eitiep; Aruek; Kombio; Aroic (Aro, Mukweym, Orok)

Language codes
- Glottolog: komb1271
- The Torricelli languages as classified by Foley (2018)

The Kombian or Kombioic languages constitute a branch of the Torricelli language family spoken in northern Papua New Guinea.

== Internal classification ==
Matthew Dryer (2024), as cited in Drinfield (2024), classifies the Kombioic languages as follows.

- Kombioic
  - Yambes
  - Core Kombioic
    - Eitiep
    - Aruek
    - Kombio
    - Aroic
      - Aro
      - Mukweym
      - Orok
