= Urim languages =

Branch of the Torricelli language family

Urim
- Kombio
- Geographic distribution: East Sepik Province, Papua New Guinea
- Linguistic classification: Torricelli: Urim
- Subdivisions: Urim; Urat; Kombio

Language codes
- Glottolog: mari1433
- The Torricelli languages as classified by Foley (2018)

The Urim languages constitute a branch of the Torricelli language family. They are spoken in East Sepik Province, in areas bordering the northeastern corner of Sandaun Province.

== Languages ==
Foley (2018) lists the following languages.

Urim, Urat, Kombio

== Vocabulary comparison ==
The following basic vocabulary words are from Laycock (1968), as cited in the Trans-New Guinea database:

The words cited constitute translation equivalents, whether they are cognate (e.g. neːp, nihip for 'leg') or not (e.g. ləŋkəp, ntoh, emen for 'head').

gloss	Urim	Urat	Torricelli
head	ləŋkəp	ntoh	emen
ear	nurkul	kwin	wolep
eye	iːkŋ	ampep	yempit
nose	ləmp	muhroŋ	wujipen
tooth	eːk	asep	nal
tongue	milip		yaŋklou
leg	neːp	nihip	araiʔ
louse	nəmin	ompik	numuk
dog	nəmpa	pwat	yimpeu
bird	wel	antet	elip
egg	haləmpar		yimpwonən
blood	waləmpop	wim	yalkup
bone	təpmuŋkut	lupuŋ	ləp
skin	palək	yahreik	alou
breast	maː	ampreip	yimep
tree	yoː	lou	lu
man	kəmel	mik	eiŋ
woman	kiːn	tuwei	injik
sun	takəni	nai	awən
moon	kanyil	wantihi	iyén
water	huw	pənip	wop
fire	waːkŋ	nih	yotou
stone	weit	yah	əntoʔ
two	weːk	hoi	wiyeu
