= Sinagen language =

Torricelli language spoken in Papua New Guinea

Sinagen
- Galu
- Native to: Papua New Guinea
- Region: Sandaun Province
- Native speakers: 330 (2003)
- Language family: Torricelli: Wapei; Sinagen

Language codes
- ISO 639-3: siu
- Glottolog: sina1269
- ELP: Galu

Sinagen is a Torricelli language of Papua New Guinea. Both Sinagen and the closely related Dia language go by the names Alu and Galu.
