= Urat =

Urat may refer to:

- Urad, or cicilos a region in Bayannur, Inner Mongolia
  - Urad Front Banner
  - Urad Middle Banner
  - Urad Rear Banner
- Urat language, in Papua New Guinea
