= Mol language =

Torricelli language of Papua New Guinea

Amol
- Alatil
- Native to: Papua New Guinea
- Region: Sandaun Province
- Native speakers: 500 (2004)
- Language family: Torricelli: Palei; Amol

Language codes
- ISO 639-3: alx
- Glottolog: amol1235
- ELP: Aru

Amol, also Alatil or Aru, is a Torricelli language of Papua New Guinea. The names Amol and Aru are both slightly erroneous. Speakers of the language call their language Mol (not Amol), while speakers of surrounding languages call the language Oru (not Aru). Matthew S. Dryer of the University at Buffalo has collected data on Mol.
