= YYU =

YYU may refer to:

- Kapuskasing Airport, Ontario, Canada, IATA airport code YYU
- Van Yüzüncü Yıl University, in Van, Turkey
- Yau language (Torricelli), ISO 639-3 language code yyu
