= Orok language =

Language of Papua New Guinea

Orok
- Region: Sandaun Province, Papua New Guinea
- Language family: Torricelli: West Torricelli; Kombio-Arapesh; Kombioic; Core Kombioic; Aroic; Orok

Language codes
- ISO 639-3: (covered by tei Torricelli)
- Glottolog: east2498

Orok is a language belonging to the Aroic (or Torricelli) language branch of the Torricelli language family. It is spoken in Sandaun Province, northwestern Papua New Guinea. Orok is closely related to Mukweym and Aro.

Orok is spoken in the three villages of Kofem, Kulifi, and Koleik.
