= Urim language =

Torricelli language spoken in Papua New Guinea

Urim
- Kalp
- Native to: Papua New Guinea
- Region: East Sepik Province, Sandaun Province
- Native speakers: 3,700 (2003)
- Language family: Torricelli: Urim; Urim
- Dialects: Kukwo; Yangkolen

Language codes
- ISO 639-3: uri
- Glottolog: urim1252
- ELP: Urim

Urim is a Torricelli language of Papua New Guinea. It is also known as Kalp; dialects are Kukwo, Yangkolen. There is a grammatical description by Hemmilä and Luoma (2009).

== Phonology ==
Urim has vowel length contrast, but only for monosyllabic words. Urim also has the prestopped nasals /pm/, /tn/, and /kŋ/.

Urim minimal pairs with short and long vowels:

- waŋ ‘time’, waːŋ ‘tree trunk’
- hen ‘wild sago’, heːn ‘outside’

Pre-stopped nasals contrast with non-pre-stopped nasals:

- wak ‘species of plant’, waŋ ‘time’, wakŋ ‘fire’
- yat ‘enough’, yan ‘father’, hatn ‘walk’
- lim ‘nose’, kipm ‘you (pl)’
- melp ‘wasp’, yelm ‘earthquake’, walpm ‘liver’

== Pronouns ==
Pronouns are:

	singular	dual	paucal	plural
1incl				mentepm
1excl	kupm	mentakŋ	minto	men
2	kitn	kipmekŋ	kipmteŋ	kipm
3	kil	tuwekŋ	tuteŋ	tu

Like the Lower Sepik-Ramu languages, Urim (as well as Kombio) distinguishes dual and paucal pronouns.
