= YEV =

YEV may refer to:

- Jewish Autonomous Oblast, Russia, ISO 3166 code RU-YEV
- Inuvik (Mike Zubko) Airport, Northwest Territories, Canada, IATA code YEV
- Yapunda language, ISO 639 language code yev
- -yev, a suffix in Azerbaijani names
