= MZF =

MZF may refer to:

- Mzamba Airport, South Africa (by IATA code)
- Mehrzweckfahrzeug, a type of emergency land ambulance in Germany known as MZF
- MZF1, a protein
- Yangum language, spoken in Papua New Guinea (by ISO 639 code)
