= Wam language =

The Wam language may refer to:

- Kugama language (also known as Wam or Wã̀m), spoken in eastern Nigeria
- Wom language (Papua New Guinea) (also known as Wam), spoken in Papua New Guinea
