= Monumbo languages =

Branch of Torricelli language family

Monumbo
- Bogia Bay
- Geographic distribution: Bogia Bay, Bogia District, Madang Province, Papua New Guinea
- Linguistic classification: Torricelli: Sepik Coast; Monumbo
- Subdivisions: Monumbo; Ngaimbom–Lilau

Language codes
- Glottolog: monu1249
- The Torricelli languages as classified by Foley (2018)

The Monumbo or Bogia Bay languages are a cluster of closely related languages that constitute a branch of the Torricelli language family. They are spoken in a few coastal villages around Bogia Bay of Bogia District, Madang Province in Papua New Guinea. Unlike all other Torricelli branches except for the Marienberg languages, word order in the Bogia languages is SOV, likely due to contact with Lower Sepik-Ramu and Sepik languages.

There are three languages: Monumbo (Mambuwan), Ngaimbom and Lilau.

== Classification ==
They have for several decades been lumped into the Torricelli family 100 km to the west. Foley (2018), Dryer, and Usher all classify them as Torricelli, based on unpublished comparisons. "No evidence [for this] was ever presented" publicly, according to Glottolog.
