= Alu language =

Alu language may refer to:

- Alu language (Papuan), or Dia, a language of Papua New Guinea
- Alu language (Austronesian), or Mono, a language of the Solomon Islands
- Alu language (Sino-Tibetan), a language of China
- Alu Kurumba language, a language of India
