= Nowhere Boys (Hong Kong band) =

Hong Kong rock band

- Born: Hansun ：2月11日; Fisher ：2月27日; Ken：6月27日; Nate：8月20日; Van ：11月7日
- Origin: Hong Kong
- Genres: Indie rock, Cinematic rock
- Years active: 2015–
- Label: Media Asia
- Members: Van (vocal); Fisher (keyboard/violin); Kenneth (guitar); Hansun (bass); Nate (drum)

Nowhere Boys is a 5-piece pop rock band in Hong Kong formed in 2015. It is currently under record label Media Asia. Band members include vocalist/guitarist Van Chan, drummer Nate Wong, guitarist Kenneth Angus, keyboardist/ violinist Fisher Kan, and bassist Hansun Chan. Nowhere Boys classified their music as ‘Cinematic Rock’, most of their songs are inspired by movies.

== Background ==
Members of Nowhere Boys are of different backgrounds. Before Nowhere Boys, Van was an architect; Nate, graduated from Berklee College of Music, was a full-time drummer. Kenneth was a guitar fixer, Fisher and Hansun taught piano/guitar.

In October 2014, Van met drummer Nate at a movie music event in Backstage Live Restaurant in Hong Kong. After jamming, they decided to form a band. Van thus found Kenneth, Fisher and Hansun whom he met earlier to form the band.

== Career ==
In July 2015, they released their first self-financed Extended Play, Nowhere Boys. The EP was recorded in their homes with their own equipment. The 1,000 copies printed were gone in three months. It also went top 10 in iTunes Music. They signed with Frenzi Music in late 2015.

Nowhere Boys then successfully crowdfunded HKD$100,000 (~ US$12,800) via Musicbee for their second EP, Welcome To Our Hyperreality, which was released in April 2016.

Nowhere Boys recorded “普通華” with actor Neo Yau Hawk-Sau in August 2016. The song went number 7 in Hong Kong Commercial Radio chart. They also created the theme song, Song of Battle, for E-Sports Festival 2016.

== Name ==
The name of the band was from the British film Nowhere Boy (2009). In a scene, young John Lennon gets told off at school. “You’re going nowhere!” snarls a furious headmaster. The future Beatles founder replies: “Is ‘nowhere’ full of geniuses, sir? Because I probably do belong there.”

== Discography ==
| Album title | Song title | Related movies |
|---|---|---|
| Nowhere Boys | 狂想曲 (Rhapsody) | / |
| Ditto | The Boy Who Wouldn’t Grow Up | Peter Pan |
| Ditto | 4, 3, 2.5 | / |
| Ditto | Castle In The Sky | Castle in the Sky |
| Ditto | 推石頭的人 | / |
| Ditto | Back In Time | The Butterfly Effect |
| Welcome To Our Hyperreality | 紅藥丸 . 藍藥丸 (feat. 黃靖) (Red Pill Blue Pill) (feat. Jing Wong) | The Matrix |
| Ditto | The Boy Who Wouldn’t Grow Up (Part 2) | Peter Pan |
| Ditto | 逃出阿卡拉 (Escape From Alcatraz) | Escape from Alcatraz |
| Ditto | Closer But Far | / |
| Ditto | 亂世超人 | / |
| Ditto | 麥克折射線 | Hu-Du-Men |
| / | 普通華 | Fat Choi Spirit, God of Gamblers II, A Moment of Romance, Full Throttle |
| / | Sound of Battle | / |

== Charts ==
Highest position in Hong Kong Charts
| Album | Song | 903 | RTHK | 997 | TVB | Remarks |
2015
| Nowhere Boys | 狂想曲 (Rhapsody) | - | - | - | - | feat. Heyo |
2016
| Nowhere Boys | 亂世超人 | - | - | - | - | |
| Welcome To Our Hyperreality | 逃出阿卡拉 (Escape From Alcatraz) | 9 | - | - | - | |
| / | 普通華 | 7 | × | × | × | feat. 游學修 |
| Welcome To Our Hyperreality | 麥克折射線 | 19 | 13 | 17 | - | |
| / | 大步走 | - | 12 | - | - | |
| / | 天外飛仙 | 2 | - | 2 | 9 | |
