= Mukweym language =

Language of Papua New Guinea

Mukweym
- Region: Sandaun Province, Papua New Guinea
- Language family: Torricelli: West Torricelli; Kombio-Arapesh; Kombioic; Core Kombioic; Aroic; Mukweym

Language codes
- ISO 639-3: (covered by tei Torricelli)
- Glottolog: mukw1234

Mukweym is a language belonging to the Aroic (or Torricelli) language branch of the Torricelli language family. It is spoken in Sandaun Province, northwestern Papua New Guinea. Mukweym is closely related to Orok and Aro.

Mukweym is spoken in the village of Dato.
