= Beli language =

Torricelli language of Papua New Guinea

Beli
- Native to: Papua New Guinea
- Region: Sandaun Province
- Native speakers: (2,200 cited 2000)
- Language family: Torricelli: Maimai; Beli

Language codes
- ISO 639-3: bey
- Glottolog: beli1258
- ELP: Beli (Papua New Guinea)

Beli is a Torricelli language of Papua New Guinea. It is also known as Akuwagel, Makarim, Mukili.

It is spoken in Mukili (3.685253°S 142.365984°E), Makapim (3.685606°S 142.383937°E), and other villages of Maimai Wanwan Rural LLG in Nuku District, Sandaun Province.
