= One language =

Torricelli dialect cluster of Papua New Guinea

One
- Aunalei
- Native to: Papua New Guinea
- Region: West Wapei Rural LLG, Sandaun Province
- Native speakers: (4,500 cited 2000)
- Language family: Torricelli: One; One

Language codes
- ISO 639-3: Variously: onr – Northern oin – Inebu aun – Molmo onk – Kabore okk – Kwamtim osu – Southern
- Linguist List: qaz One
- Glottolog: onee1245
- ELP: One

One (also known as Onele and Aunalei) is a Torricelli dialect cluster of West Wapei Rural LLG in Sandaun Province, Papua New Guinea.

== Languages ==
Glottolog 4.0 lists the following One varieties as separate languages:

- Southern One
- Kwamtim One
- Central-Northern One
  - Inebu One
  - Kabore One
  - Molmo One
  - Northern One

A detailed dialectology of One is described in Crowther's (2001) unpublished honour's thesis.

The One dialects are spoken in the following villages and wards of West Wapei Rural LLG, Sandaun Province.

- Kwamtim One is spoken in Kwamtum (3.447311°S 141.909351°E) and Kwatim (3.45713°S 141.907889°E) villages.
- Inebu One is spoken in Inebu ward (3.381711°S 141.936°E).
- Kabore One is spoken in Kabore ward (3.314106°S 141.840799°E).
- Molmo One is spoken in Molmo ward (3.362595°S 141.855041°E).
- Northern One is spoken in the villages of Goiniri, Wolwale, Romei, Barera, Karantu, Kalau, Wantipi and Wuguble.

== Phonology ==
Molmo One consonants are:

m	n	
p	t	k
f	s	
w	l	j
	r	

Molmo One vowels are:

i	ɨ	u
e		o
ɛ	a	ɔ

== Pronouns ==
Molmo One pronouns:

	sg	du	pl
1incl		mimpla ~ fimpla	mine
1excl	i	mumpla ~ fumpla	mo
2	(y)ine ~ yo	pimpla	pine ~ po
3	wine ~ wo	numpla	nine ~ no

== Nouns ==
Molmo One nominal plural formatives include:

gloss	singular	plural
‘woman’	pino	pini
‘wife’	puli	pulpi
‘flower’	sula	sulu
‘lizard’	saunina	saune
‘mosquito’	unkun	unkle
‘thorn’	neni	nenine
