= Ygl =

Ygl, YGL or ygl may refer to:

- La Grande Rivière Airport, Quebec, Canada
- Yangum language, spoken in Papua New Guinea
- Young Global Leaders, World Economic Forum community
