= Yau language =

Yau language may refer to:

- Yau language (Trans–New Guinea)
- Yau language (Torricelli)

== See also ==
- Yao language
- Yao languages
