= Srenge language =

Torricelli language of Papua New Guinea

Srenge
- Aruop
- Lauisaranga
- Native to: Papua New Guinea
- Region: Sandaun Province: 7 villages
- Native speakers: 200 (2026)
- Language family: Torricelli: Palei; Srenge

Language codes
- ISO 639-3: lsr
- Glottolog: aruo1240
- ELP: Aruop

Srenge or Aruop is a Torricelli language of Papua New Guinea.

== Names ==
Speakers of the language call the language Srenge or Lawu Srenge, where lawu is the Srenge word for 'language'. Speakers of surrounding languages call the language Aruop, which is the Srenge word for no, following a common convention in the region of using the word for 'no' in a language as a name for that language.

== Documentation ==
Documentation of Srenge is currently underway by Matthew S. Dryer and Lea Brown of the University at Buffalo.

Jose A. Jódar-Sánchez completed a doctoral dissertation on the grammar of Srenge in 2026.

== Distribution ==
Srenge is spoken in seven villages, which are categorized into "old villages" and "new villages" by the Srenge people.

- sa sangi ‘old villages’: Alona, Anipo, Marakumba, Parkop, and Suwara (older settlements founded by the Srenge people)
- sa ymboyi ‘new villages’: Asier and Sibilanga (more recent settlements founded by outsiders)
