= Laeko language =

Torricelli language spoken in Papua New Guinea

Laeko
- Laeko-Libuat
- Native to: Papua New Guinea
- Region: Sandaun Province
- Native speakers: ca. 720 (2003)
- Language family: Torricelli: Maimai; Laeko

Language codes
- ISO 639-3: lkl
- Glottolog: laek1243
- ELP: Laeko-Libuat
- Coordinates: 3.69819°S 142.290141°E

Laeko, or Laeko-Libuat (pronounced Limbuat), is a Torricelli language of Papua New Guinea.

It is spoken in Leiko (3.69819°S 142.290141°E) and Libuat (3.704849°S 142.284472°E) villages of Leiko ward, Maimai Wanwan Rural LLG, Nuku District, Sandaun Province.
