= Minidien language =

Endangered Torricelli language of Papua New Guinea

Wiaki
- Minidien
- Native to: Papua New Guinea
- Region: Sandaun Province
- Ethnicity: 1,190 (2000 census)
- Native speakers: 100 (2004)
- Language family: Torricelli: Maimai; Wiaki

Language codes
- ISO 639-3: wii
- Glottolog: mini1253
- ELP: Wiaki

Wiaki, a.k.a. Minidien, is a nearly extinct Torricelli language of Papua New Guinea. The language is spoken in moderation by those residing in the older generations.
