= Wanap language =

Torricelli language spoken in Papua New Guinea

Wanap
- Kayik
- Native to: Papua New Guinea
- Region: Sandaun Province
- Native speakers: 1,100 (2003)
- Language family: Torricelli: Palei; Wanap

Language codes
- ISO 639-3: wnp
- Glottolog: wana1268
- ELP: Kayik

Wanap or Kayik is a Torricelli language of Papua New Guinea.
