= Seta language =

Torricelli language of Papua New Guinea

Seta
- Native to: Papua New Guinea
- Region: Sandaun Province
- Native speakers: (180 cited 2000 census)
- Language family: Torricelli: One; Seta

Language codes
- ISO 639-3: stf
- Glottolog: seta1245
- ELP: Seta

Seta is a Torricelli language of Papua New Guinea.
