= Yis language =

Torricelli language of Papua New Guinea

Yis
- Native to: Papua New Guinea
- Region: Sandaun Province
- Native speakers: 800 (2014)
- Language family: Torricelli: Wapei; Yis

Language codes
- ISO 639-3: yis
- Glottolog: yiss1240
- ELP: Yis

Yis is a Torricelli language of Papua New Guinea.
