= Gnau language =

Torricelli language of Papua New Guinea

Gnau
- Native to: Papua New Guinea
- Region: Sandaun Province, Namblo Census Division, northwest of Maimai.
- Native speakers: (1,300 cited 2000 census)
- Language family: Torricelli: Wapei; Gnau

Language codes
- ISO 639-3: gnu
- Glottolog: gnau1240
- ELP: Gnau
- Coordinates: 3°35′S 142°11′E

Gnau is a language spoken in Papua New Guinea. It is part of the Torricelli language family, named by convention after its distinctive word for "no". The Gnau people do not identify themselves as a unified group across multiple settlements, despite their shared language.
