= Agi language =

Torricelli language spoken in Papua New Guinea

Agi
- Native to: Papua New Guinea
- Region: Sandaun Province
- Native speakers: 960 (2003)
- Language family: Torricelli: Palei; Agi

Language codes
- ISO 639-3: aif
- Glottolog: agii1245
- ELP: Agi

Agi is a Torricelli language of Papua New Guinea.
