= Nabi language =

Torricelli language spoken in Papua New Guinea

Nabi
- Metan
- Native to: Papua New Guinea
- Region: Sandaun Province
- Native speakers: 620 (2003)
- Language family: Torricelli: Maimai; Nabi

Language codes
- ISO 639-3: mty
- Glottolog: nabi1239
- ELP: Nambi

Nabi (Nambi), a.k.a. Metan, is a Torricelli language of Papua New Guinea. It was assigned to the Maimai branch in Ross (2005).

The language is spoken in three villages; according to Ethnologue, in two they prefer the name Nabi, and in the third Metan.
