= Ningil language =

Torricelli language of Papua New Guinea

Ningil
- Native to: Papua New Guinea
- Region: Sandaun Province
- Native speakers: (950 cited 2000 census)
- Language family: Torricelli: Wapei; Ningil

Language codes
- ISO 639-3: niz
- Glottolog: ning1273
- ELP: Ningil

Ningil is a Torricelli language of Papua New Guinea.

== Phonology ==
Ningil consonants are:

p	t	k	ʔ
ɸ	s	ɣ	
m	n	ŋ	
	l		
	r		
w	j		

Ningil vowels are:

i	ɨ	u
e	ə	o
a		
