= Yambes language =

Torricelli language of Papua New Guinea

Yambes
- Native to: Papua New Guinea
- Region: East Sepik Province
- Native speakers: 1,100 (2003)
- Language family: Torricelli: Kombian; Yambes

Language codes
- ISO 639-3: ymb
- Glottolog: yamb1254
- ELP: Yambes

Yambes is a Torricelli language of Papua New Guinea spoken mostly by older adults. There is little data to classify it, and it is therefore left unclassified within Torricelli by Malcolm Ross (2005). Dryer (2024), as cited in Drinfield (2024), classifies it as a Kombioic language.

It is spoken in Yambes village (3.545596°S 142.746582°E) of Dreikikier Rural LLG, East Sepik Province.
