= Seti language =

Torricelli language of Papua New Guinea

Seti
- Native to: Papua New Guinea
- Region: Sandaun Province
- Native speakers: 160 (2003)
- Language family: Torricelli: One; Seti

Language codes
- ISO 639-3: sbi
- Glottolog: seti1248
- ELP: Seti

Seti is a Torricelli language of Papua New Guinea.
