= Elkei language =

Torricelli language of Papua New Guinea

Elkei
- Native to: Sandaun, Papua New Guinea
- Native speakers: (1,600 cited 2000)
- Language family: Torricelli: Wapei; Elkei

Language codes
- ISO 639-3: elk
- Glottolog: elke1240
- ELP: Elkei

Elkei (Olkoi) is a Torricelli language of Papua New Guinea.
