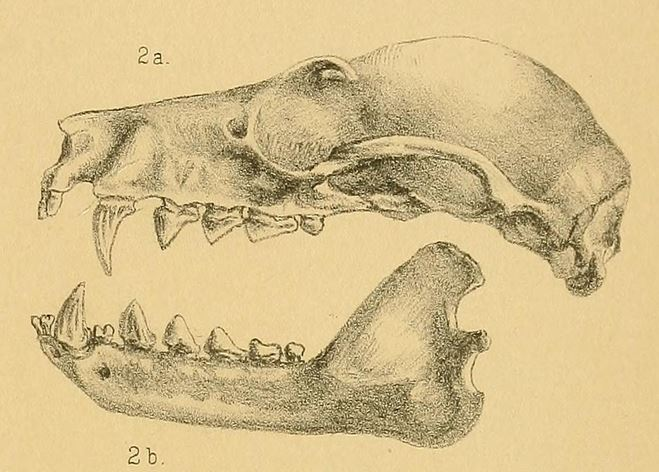

Conservation status
- Least Concern (IUCN 3.1)

Scientific classification
- Kingdom: Animalia
- Phylum: Chordata
- Class: Mammalia
- Order: Chiroptera
- Family: Pteropodidae
- Genus: Pteropus
- Species: P. admiralitatum

Binomial name
- Pteropus admiralitatum Thomas, 1894
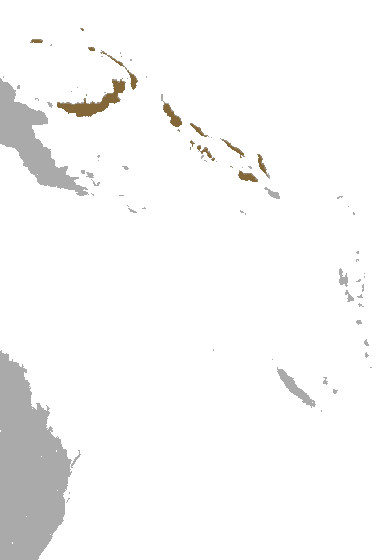
- Admiralty flying fox range

= Admiralty flying fox =

Species of bat

The Admiralty flying fox (Pteropus admiralitatum) is a species of fruit bat in the family Pteropodidae, the megabats. It is found in Papua New Guinea and the Solomon Islands.

== Taxonomy and etymology ==
It was first described by British zoologist Oldfield Thomas in 1894, based on specimens collected by the Challenger Expedition in 1875. The type specimen is held at the Natural History Museum, London.

The Admiralty flying fox is possibly a species complex of three species, with one species occupying the Admiralty Islands and the Solomon Islands from Buka Island to Malaita Island. A second species is thought to occupy Western Province, Guadalcanal, and Malaita Island. The third species is thought to occupy Mussau Island and Emirau Island.

Its species name admiralitum is a Neo-Latin rendering of "admiralty", which is in reference to the Admiralty Islands where this species was first documented.

== Description ==
It is similar in appearance to the small flying fox, though it is smaller. It is further distinguished by its much smaller ears and the fact that its chest and abdomen are the same color. The top of its head is pale gray, while the back of its neck is a reddish-brown. Its dorsal fur is brown, with some white hairs interspersed. The head and body length is approximately 180 mm (7.1 in); its forearm length is 121 mm (4.8 in); its ear length is 17.5 mm (0.69 in).

== Range and habitat ==
It is found in several countries in Oceania, including Solomon Islands and Papua New Guinea.

== Conservation ==
It is currently evaluated as least concern by the IUCN—its lowest conservation priority. While it is likely threatened to some extent by deforestation and exploitation for bushmeat, these are not considered major problems. Overall, it is not of concern because it has a large geographic range, presumably large population size, and it is not thought to be in rapid decline.
