= Siliput language =

Torricelli language of Papua New Guinea

Siliput
- Maimai
- Native to: Papua New Guinea
- Region: Sandaun Province
- Native speakers: 520 (2003)
- Language family: Torricelli: Maimai; Maimai proper; Siliput

Language codes
- ISO 639-3: mkc
- Glottolog: sili1247
- ELP: Siliput
- Coordinates: 3.632449°S 142.434278°E

Siliput, a.k.a. Maimai, is a Torricelli language of Papua New Guinea. It is spoken in Seleput village (3.632449°S 142.434278°E), Mawase Rural LLG, Sandaun Province.
