= Bragat language =

Torricelli language

Bragat
- Native to: Papua New Guinea
- Region: Sandaun Province
- Native speakers: 460 (2003)
- Language family: Torricelli: Palei; Bragat

Language codes
- ISO 639-3: aof
- Glottolog: brag1240
- ELP: Bragat

Bragat is a Torricelli language of Papua New Guinea. It is spoken in four villages, including in Yauan village (3.50179°S 142.57953°E), Sundun ward, Palmai Rural LLG, Sandaun Province.
