= Yil language =

Torricelli language of Papua New Guinea

Yil
- Native to: Papua New Guinea
- Region: Sandaun Province
- Native speakers: (2,500 cited 2000 census)
- Language family: Torricelli: Wapei; Yil

Language codes
- ISO 639-3: yll
- Glottolog: yill1241
- ELP: Yil

Yil is a Torricelli language of Papua New Guinea spoken in twelve villages in Sundaun province.

== Phonology ==
This section follows Martens and Tuominen (1977). Yil has a small inventory of ten consonants:

	Bilabial	Alveolar	Velar
Stop	p	t	k
Fricative		s	ɣ
Nasal	m	n	ŋ
Trill		r	
Lateral		l	

And seven vowels:

	Front		Central	Back
	unrounded	rounded	Central	Back
Close	i	y	ə~ɵ	u
Mid	ɛ~æ		ə~ɵ	o
Open	ɛ~æ		a	

In addition there are the diphthongs /ai̯ au̯ ay̯ ei̯/. /i u/ have non-syllabic allophones [j w~β] in onset or coda position. /ɣ/ is devoiced to [x] word-finally, e.g. /uəmaɣ/ [wəmax] 'hawk'.

=== Phonotactics ===
Maximum syllable structure is (C) (C) V (C) (C). Syllables with two-consonant codas only occur word-finally. Distribution of phonemes in different syllable types is shown in the table below.

Syllable type	Phoneme distribution	Example(s)
V	Any vowels may occur	/i/ "I"
CV	Any consonant or vowel may occur	/ni/ "water"
CVC	Any consonant or vowel may occur	/sak/ "pig"
VC	V: /i ə o ɛ a/ C: /p s m n ŋ l r u i/	/an/ "he" /ar/ "she"
C₁C₂VC₃	C₁: /p t k/ C₂: /r/ V: /u o a/ C₃: /p k r/	/prok/ "quickly" /trok/ "thigh" /krup/ "white bird"
C₁VC₂C₃	C₁: any consonant may occur V: /u o a/ C₂: /ɣ m n ŋ l r/ C₃: /p t k ɣ r/	/lank/ "night" /nakalp/ "back of house" /namaŋalk/ "bird"
VC₁C₂	Rarely observed	/ark/ "termite"
*C₁C₂VC₃C₄	Not observed	

Stress usually falls on the first syllable, although it is contrastive in some verb forms, e.g. /əˈŋati/ "I bury a man" vs. /ˈəŋati/ "I hurry"
