= Dreikikier Rural LLG =

Local-level government in Papua New Guinea

- Location within Papua New Guinea
- Coordinates: 3.578545°S 142.76672°E
- Country: Papua New Guinea
- Province: East Sepik Province
- Time zone: UTC+10 (AEST)

Dreikikir Rural LLG (sometimes spelled Drekikier Rural LLG) is a local-level government (LLG) of East Sepik Province, Papua New Guinea.

== Wards ==
- 01. Tumam
- 02. Moihwak
- 03. Musungua
- 04. Taihunge
- 05. Mosinau
- 06. Prombil
- 07. Missim
- 08. Eimul/Pelnandu
- 09. Musindai
- 10. Bana
- 11. Hambini
- 12. Waringama
- 13. Selni
- 14. Aresili
- 15. Whaleng
- 16. Yawatong
- 17. Lainimguap
- 18. Krunguanam
- 19. Yakrumbok
- 20. King
- 21. Kofem
- 22. Sakap
- 23. Makumauip
- 24. Tong
- 25. Kumbun
- 26. Miringe
- 27. Yawerng
- 28. Yambes (Yambes language speakers)
- 29. Waim/Saiweep
- 30. Moseng
- 31. Pagilo
- 32. Luwaite
- 33. Selnau
