= Yahang language =

Torricelli language spoken in Papua New Guinea

Yahang
- Ruruhip
- Native to: Papua New Guinea
- Region: Sandaun Province
- Native speakers: 1,400 (2003)
- Language family: Torricelli: Maimai; Maimai proper; Yahang–Heyo; Yahang

Language codes
- ISO 639-3: rhp
- Glottolog: yaha1247
- ELP: Yahang

Yahang (Ya’unk) a.k.a. Ruruhip (Ruruhi’ip) is a Torricelli language of Papua New Guinea. It shares the name Ruruhip with Heyo, which is closely related.

== Phonology ==
Yahang's consonants are:

	Labial	Alveolar	Velar	Glottal
Plosive	p	t	k	ʔ
Fricative	f	s		h
Trill		r		
Lateral		l		
Semivowel	w	j		

Yahang's vowels are:

	Front	Central	Back
Close	i	ɨ	u
Mid	e	ə	o
Back	a		
