= Au language =

Torricelli language of Papua New Guinea

Au
- Native to: Sandaun, Papua New Guinea: 19 villages
- Native speakers: (8,000 cited 2000 census)
- Language family: Torricelli: Wapei; Au

Language codes
- ISO 639-3: avt
- Glottolog: auuu1241
- ELP: Au

Au is a Torricelli language of Papua New Guinea.
