= Gray flying fox =

Conservation status
- Vulnerable (IUCN 3.1)

Scientific classification
- Kingdom: Animalia
- Phylum: Chordata
- Class: Mammalia
- Order: Chiroptera
- Family: Pteropodidae
- Genus: Pteropus
- Species: P. griseus

Binomial name
- Pteropus griseus É. Geoffroy, 1810
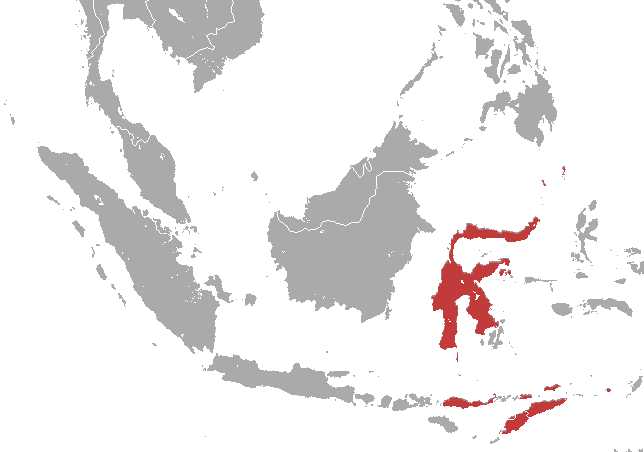
- Gray flying fox range

Species of mammal

The gray flying fox (Pteropus griseus) is a species of flying fox in the family Pteropodidae. It is not to be confused with the grey-headed flying fox (Pteropus poliocephalus). It is found in Indonesia and Timor-Leste, but not in the Philippines, despite occasional reference to such. Very little is known about this species. The gray flying fox has small size and neutral coloration with a brownish head and an orange abdomen. It probably roosts individually or in small groups. It was listed on appendix II of CITES, and is classified as "Data Deficient" by the IUCN. This species has been decimated by hunting for bushmeat in Indonesia. The hunters use fishing hooks, ropes, and other supplies to hunt the bats. The ropes and hooks are placed along their flight paths, tearing and ensnaring the bats' wings when are flying. In the course of a hunting season, entire colonies can be killed.

== Taxonomy ==
The species was first described in 1810 by Étienne Geoffroy Saint-Hilaire, using a specimen obtained on Timor during a French scientific expedition. Geoffroy's assignment of the species to the genus Pteropus has remained current.

== Ecology ==
Specimens of Pteropus griseus have been found to be infested with Cyclopodia horsfieldi, a species of Nycteribiidae fly. Flying foxes have important ecosystem roles as seed dispersers and pollinators because the only extant animals capable of dispersing large seeds within 30mm diameter long distances. Grey flying foxes are critically important to their ecosystems by providing pollination from great distances to boost biodiversity and influence forest regeneration
