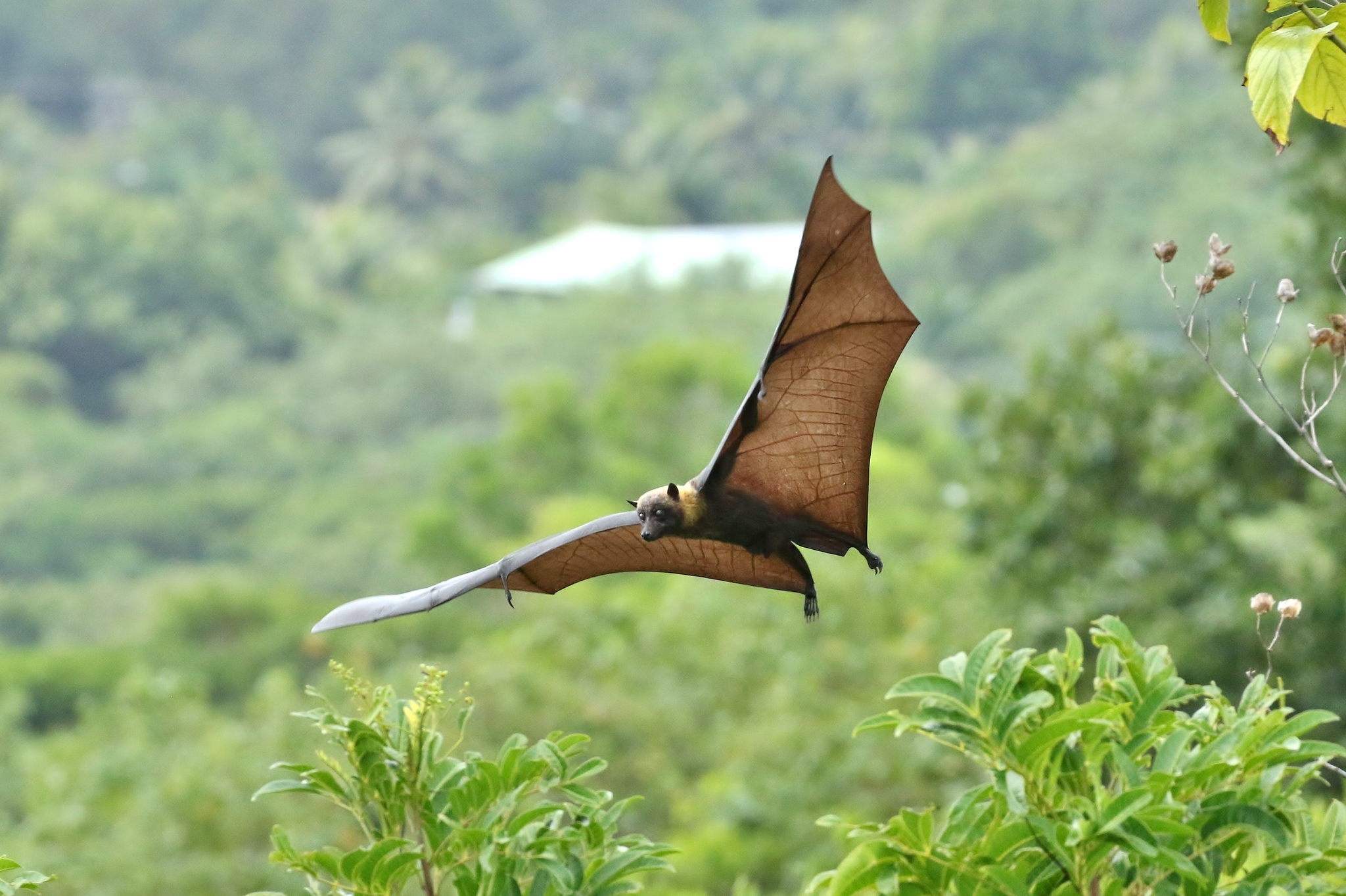
- Pteropus pelewensis yapensis

Conservation status
- Vulnerable (IUCN 3.1)
- CITES Appendix I

Scientific classification
- Kingdom: Animalia
- Phylum: Chordata
- Class: Mammalia
- Order: Chiroptera
- Family: Pteropodidae
- Genus: Pteropus
- Species: P. pelewensis

Binomial name
- Pteropus pelewensis K. Andersen, 1908
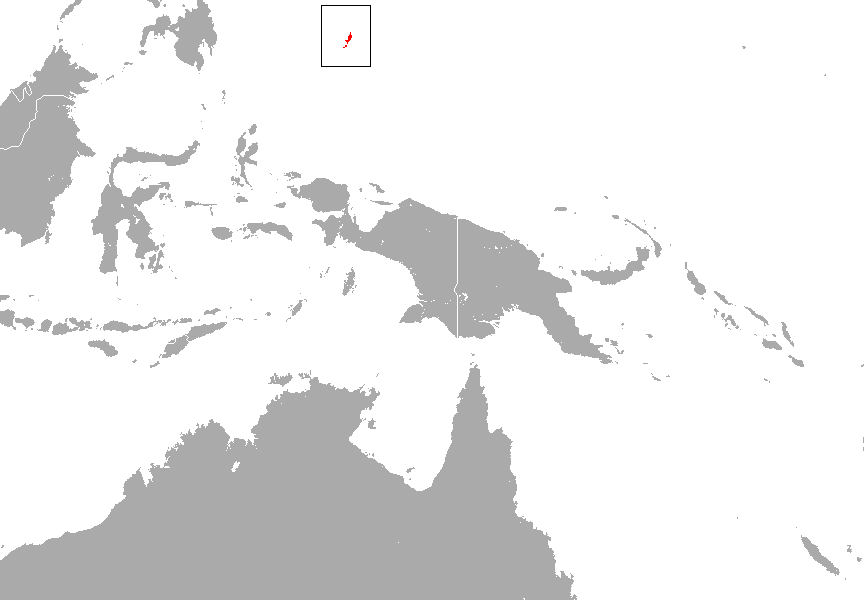
- Pelew flying fox range

Synonyms
- Pteropus mariannus pelewensis

= Pelew flying fox =

Species of bat

The Pelew flying fox (Pteropus pelewensis) is a species of megabat from the genus Pteropus found in the Palau Islands. A subspecies found on Yap, the Yap flying fox, is considered as a separate species by some authorities. The species is listed as vulnerable by the IUCN due to commercial and small-scale hunting. Commercial hunting for the species was banned in 1994, but local exploitation is common. The species is listed on CITES appendix I.
