= Olo language =

Torricelli language of Papua New Guinea

Olo
- Native to: Papua New Guinea
- Region: Sandaun Province
- Native speakers: 14,000 (2003)
- Language family: Torricelli: Wapei; Olo
- Dialects: Payi (Pay); Wapi (Wape)

Language codes
- ISO 639-3: ong
- Glottolog: oloo1241
- ELP: Olo

Olo (Orlei) is a non-Austronesian, Torricelli language of Papua New Guinea. The language is spoken in 55 villages, from the Aitape Township (north) to the Sandaun Province (south), and is at risk of going extinct. Olo is believed to be a Goal Oriented Activation language, meaning the speaker chooses their words with an idea of what they are trying to achieve with the listener in mind; this has been labeled as referential theory. Referential theory has been divided into four groupings, all of which come with disadvantages, recency, episodes, prominence, and memorial activation.

== Classification ==
Olo derives from the Torricelli language phylum and belongs to the Wapei family. The two dialects that are spoken are Payi (Pay) and Wapi (Wape). The dialect boundaries are not absolute and are based on the prominent differences in grammar. Despite the differences, they share dialect chaining.

== Phonology ==
=== Consonants ===
The chart below includes the consonants used in the Olo language, /p, t, k, f, s, m, n, ŋ, w, y/. Three types of nasals are used when speaking this language, alveolar, bilabial, and velar. Alveolar nasals occur near the teeth, /n/, bilabial nasals occur at the base of the tongue in close proximity to the roof of the mouth towards the beginning of the throat, and velar nasals occur on the lips. A rule of Olo is that a velar nasal only happens before a velar stop. Stops are not executed on the exhalation of breathe, making them weakly articulated.

Consonant Chart
	Labial	Alveolar	Velar
Nasal	m	n	ŋ
Stop	p	t	k
Fricative	f	s	
Lateral		l	
Liquid		r	
Semivowel	w	j	

=== Vowels ===
According to phonology, Olo has seven vowels, but orthography acknowledges five, /ɪ/ and /ʊ/ are usually seen as "i" and "u".

Vowel Chart
	Front	Central	Back
High	i		u
Mid-high	ɪ		ʊ
Mid	ɛ		ɔ
Low		a	

== Morphology ==
Olo is classified as an SVO (subject, verb, object) language under normal circumstance, but in certain cases, the object can be fronted, the subject can continue on as a free noun, or there can be occurrences similar to passive tense in English.

=== Nominals ===
Nominal plural formatives include:

gloss	singular	plural
‘ear’	mingi	mingim
‘banana’	tefa	tefas
‘betelnut’	mere	meri
‘garden’	liom	lipes
‘coconut’	wom	wefes
‘boar’	wasene	wasem
‘wound’	pam	pape
‘seasoning’	num	nus
‘hand’	eti	esi
‘branch’	uno	ine
‘wing’	naru	nare
‘liver’	pale	palu

=== Verbs ===
Olo uses prefixes that attach to the verb serves as markers for the subjects and gives the listener information about the person, number and gender. The object's person, number, and gender is identified by the suffix or infix. There are three persons (first, second, and third), three numbers (singular, dual, and plural) and two genders (masculine, feminine).

==== Subject prefix ====
Subject Prefixes
prefix	gloss	English equivalent
k-	first person singular	I
w-	first person dual	we two
m-	first person plural	we
o-	second person singular	you
y-	second person plural	you
l-	third person singular masculine	he
n-	third person singular female	she
t-	third person dual masculine	they two
m-	third person dual feminine	they two
p-	third person plural	they

Verbs that begin with a vowel take the prefix. Verbs that start with /r/ and /l/ are the only verbs that begin with a consonant that can take on a verbal prefix.

==== Object infixes ====
Object Infixes
prefix	English
-l-	him
-n-	her
-ut-	two males
-m-	two females
-p-	them

==== Object suffixes ====
Suffixes, and some infixes, indicate first or second person objects and applies to all transitive verbs. When an infix is used to describe an object's first or second person, if the first syllable contains /a/ or /e/, it transforms into /ei/.

First and Second Suffixes
suffix	gloss	English equivalent
-iki	first person singular	I
-uku	first person plural	us
-ye	second person singular	you
-ise	second person plural	you (all)

There is a fundamental difference between -(w)o and -o; -o follows the vowel /i/ and -wo follows in all other scenarios.

Third Person Object Suffixes
set 1	set 2	gloss	English
-(w)o	-o	third singular masculine	him
-ene	-ne	third singular feminine	her
-enge	-nge	third dual masculine	them two
-eme	-me	third dual feminine	them (women)
-epe	-pe	third plural	them
