= Ambrak language =

Torricelli language of Papua New Guinea

Ambrak
- Native to: Papua New Guinea
- Region: Nuku District, Sandaun Province
- Native speakers: (290 cited 2000 census)
- Language family: Torricelli: Palei; Aiku; Ambrak

Language codes
- ISO 639-3: aag
- Glottolog: ambr1239

Ambrak is a Torricelli language spoken in Nuku District of Sandaun Province in Papua New Guinea. According to the 2000 census, there are 290 speakers.
