= Lilau language =

Torricelli language spoken in Papua New Guinea

Lilau
- Ngaimbom
- Native to: Papua New Guinea
- Region: Lilau ward, Almami Rural LLG, Bogia District, Madang Province
- Native speakers: (450, including Ngaimbom cited 1981)
- Language family: Torricelli – Sepik Coast: Sepik Coast; Monumbo; Ngaimbom–Lilau; Lilau

Language codes
- ISO 639-3: lll
- Glottolog: lila1246
- ELP: Lilau
- Coordinates: 4.333281°S 145.00845°E

Lilau, or Ngaimbom, is a Papuan language of Papua New Guinea, closely related to Monumbo. It is spoken in Lilau ward (4.333281°S 145.00845°E), Almami Rural LLG, Bogia District, Madang Province.
