= Yangum language =

Torricelli dialects of Papua New Guinea

Yangum
- Aiku
- Native to: Papua New Guinea
- Region: Sandaun Province
- Native speakers: (960 cited 2000 census)
- Language family: Torricelli: Palei; Aiku; Yangum

Language codes
- ISO 639-3: Variously: ymo – Yangum Mon yde – Yangum Dey ygl – Yangum Gel
- Glottolog: yang1303
- ELP: Aiku

Yangum is a Torricelli dialect cluster of Papua New Guinea. Gel is nearly extinct. The principal variety is Mon, which is also known as Aiku, Malek, Menandon ~ Minendon; these names have been used for all Yangum varieties plus the closely related Ambrak.
