= Monumbo language =

Papuan language of Papua New Guinea

Monumbo
- Native to: Papua New Guinea
- Region: Bogia District, Madang Province
- Native speakers: 410 (2003)
- Language family: Torricelli – Sepik Coast: Sepik Coast; Monumbo languages; Monumbo

Language codes
- ISO 639-3: mxk
- Glottolog: nucl1458
- ELP: Monumbo

Monumbo is a Papuan language of Papua New Guinea. There is an early description in German. It is closely related to Lilau.

== Phonology ==
Mambuwan consonants are:

Consonants
| | | Labial | Alveolar | Palatal | Velar | Uvular |
|---|---|---|---|---|---|---|
| Nasal | | m | n | | ŋ | |
| Plosive | voiceless | p | t | | k | q |
| Plosive | prenasalized | ᵐb | ⁿd | | ᵑɡ | |
| Fricative | voiceless | | s | | | |
| Fricative | voiced | | z | | ɣ | |
| Rhotic | | | r | | | |
| Approximant | | w | l | j | | |

Mambuwan vowels are:

Vowels
| | Front | Central | Back |
|---|---|---|---|
| Close | i | | u |
| Close-Mid | e | ə | o |
| Open-Mid | ɛ | ə | ɔ |
| Open | | a | |

== Grammar ==
Monumbo distinguishes five gender classes for singular and dual third-person pronouns, but only two gender classes (masculine and feminine) for third-person plural pronouns, a typologically unusual feature. There are five genders for the third-person pronoun, which are masculine, feminine, neutral, diminutive, and miscellaneous genders.

Mambuwan subject agreement prefixes are:

| | sg | du | pl |
|---|---|---|---|
| 1 | a- | i- | i- |
| 2 | si- ~ su- | u- | u- |
| 3M | ni- ~ nu- | ma- | gi- |
| 3F | w- | wa- | |
| 3N | i- | ma- | bo- |
| 3DIM | mi- | ba- | |
| 3OTHER | gi- | ga- | |

Mambuwan has a general oblique case marker –unum ~ -Cusum for nouns:

ŋait-unum
fire-OBL
‘in/at/with/through fire’

Mambuwan also makes use of postpositions such as ŋaŋ ‘inside’:

su ŋaŋ
water inside
‘in the water’

Mambuwan has highly complex verbal inflection.

== Nouns ==
Some Mambuwan nouns and their respective plural forms:

| gloss | singular | plural |
|---|---|---|
| ‘mouth’ | alakam | alakambo |
| ‘leg’ | sabo | sabo |
| ‘thorn’ | pupuk | pupuka |
| ‘door’ | kigi | kigika |
| ‘stream’ | su | suga |
| ‘crab’ | dɔra | dɔrage |
| ‘name’ | inu | inuore |
| ‘beach’ | lulu | luluore |
| ‘coconut’ | dɛ | dɛip |
| ‘island’ | mot | motiwe |
| ‘hand’ | naŋdabi | naŋdabian |
