= Heyo language =

Torricelli language of Papua New Guinea

Heyo
- Arinua
- Native to: Papua New Guinea
- Region: Sandaun Province
- Native speakers: 1,500 (2018)
- Language family: Torricelli: Maimai; Maimai proper; Yahang–Heyo; Heyo

Language codes
- ISO 639-3: auk
- Glottolog: heyo1240
- ELP: Heyo

Heyo a.k.a. Arinua (Arinwa, Arima) is a Torricelli language of Papua New Guinea. It is also known as Lolopani and Ruruhip. The name Ruruhip is also shared with Yahang, which is closely related.

== See also ==
- Wanib Sign Language
