= Wapei languages =

Branch of the Torricelli language family

Wapei
- Wapeic
- Geographic distribution: eastern Sandaun Province, Papua New Guinea
- Linguistic classification: Torricelli: Wapei–Palei; Wapei

Language codes
- Glottolog: wape1250 (Wapeic)
- The Torricelli languages as classified by Foley (2018). Wapei and Palei languages are yellow.

The Wapei languages constitute a branch of the Torricelli language family according to Laycock (1975) (quoted from Foley 2018). Glottolog does not accept this grouping. They are spoken in mountainous regions of eastern Sandaun Province, Papua New Guinea.

== Languages ==
Languages are:

- Alu–Galu: Alu, Sinagen
- A.O.E: Au, Olo, Elkei
- Yau–Yis: Yis, Yau
- Ningil–Yil: Yil, Ningil
- West Palai [perhaps Palei languages]: Yeri (Yapunda), Walman

Gnau may also belong here.

== Pronouns ==
Pronouns in Wapei languages are:

Wapei pronouns
	Elkei	Yau	Yis	Au	Yil	Ningil
1s	ki	ki	ki	xi	i	yi
2s	ite	yi	yi	ti	a	pay
3s	elel	rən	rən	xərak	an	pan
1p	ku	kufu	kufu	xaiw	aw	you
2p	yife	yifi	yifi	yi	ɨ	piyou
3p	elpel	rəl	rəl	xər	aral	pəram

== Vocabulary comparison ==
The following basic vocabulary words are from Laycock (1968), as cited in the Trans-New Guinea database.

The words cited constitute translation equivalents, whether they are cognate (e.g. wupli, wopli, wufliyəx for “sun”) or not (e.g. yipwur, maləx, nəfənək for “nose”).

gloss	Au	Dia	Elkei	Ningil	Olo	Sinagen	Yil	Yis	Yau
head	faʔan	pale	palau	waʔal	uːru	peine	ariyi	lülü	nülü
ear	nikif	ma	ŋipi	məkər	məŋkam	ma	mək	yapot	yampər
eye	naʔan	yampax		namək	lüs	napaka	nap	kwutiyane	kwuriyaf
nose	yipwur	maləx		nəfənək	minopoŋko	malka	nupuŋk	minityu	minit
tooth	yaxas	yaŋkən	nulpo	naː	nelpə	naːkən	nak	yanət	yaːnət
tongue	niːn	yilwat	yuwaŋ	waːr	non		war		yimyau
leg	xət	xuwə	tiye	yau	orou	walək	suː	kiriu	kiriu
louse	nəmk	raləx	nəmeiləm	nəmaŋkar	nəmom	rarka	namkar	kwutəl	kwurəl
dog	napara	patə	palel	faréː	pele	pata	par	asi	piːren
bird	xoura	antə	aulon	aprei	nafle	nata	afər	yafren	yafren
egg	yinu	yilkit	yülam	yuːlək	yiləm	puta	wiːlər	yilip	walilip
blood	amkra	amkə	omkol	niːkri	təlüs	leŋka	nək	nawan	nawe
bone	xəmik	lakət	emiŋel	ləmeʔi	emio	lakita	nimik	kəmiene	kumialen
skin	yilik	pawült	paulou	faːwal	topo	pawulta	pawar	tərkwaf	ternan
breast	nəm	mate	niman	maːʔ	nemer	mata	mak	nəmar	numar
tree	nuː	lowə	nipel	luː	nəmpe	niːpa	loː	nifif	nimpip
man	mitik	teralkit	monol	masin	metene	matei	məsin	metfaine	ruːtil
woman	mite	yuː	matal	naʔ aipi	moːto	nusakei	matei	kulum	wapur
sun	wupli	wopli	wopli	wufliyəx	epli	xahi	wupli	kwapli	kwipli
moon	wunkə	ouyi	auniyil	onyil	ane	aunəxə	uni	noulai	nuːlai
water	təpar	niː	tipel	niː	tepe	wɨn	niː	tipal	təpal
fire	siː	yalix	wul	walk	weli	yakə	walk	wəti	weli
stone		xəte	talmanəf	xəroi	erau	kita	yir	kranə	krapene
two	wikat	wiye	wiŋe	wilal	wiŋkes	fiyə	wiyem	wiyum	wiyəm
