= Walman language =

Torricelli language spoken in Papua New Guinea

Walman
- Koroko
- Native to: Papua New Guinea
- Region: Sandaun Province
- Native speakers: 1,700 (2003)
- Language family: Torricelli: Wapei; Walman

Language codes
- ISO 639-3: van
- Glottolog: valm1241
- ELP: Walman

Walman (or Valman) is a Torricelli language of Papua New Guinea. Matthew S. Dryer and Lea Brown of the University at Buffalo are currently writing a grammar of Walman. They have also published a paper showing that the word for 'and' in Walman that connects two nouns (as in "John and Mary") is actually a verb, with the first conjunct as subject and the second conjunct as object.
