= West Wapei Rural LLG =

Local-level government in Papua New Guinea

- Location within Papua New Guinea
- Coordinates: 3.40°S 141.89°E
- Country: Papua New Guinea
- Province: Sandaun Province
- Time zone: UTC+10 (AEST)

West Wapei Rural LLG is a local-level government (LLG) of Sandaun Province, Papua New Guinea. The West Wapei languages (also called the One languages) are spoken in this LLG.

== Wards ==
- 01. Kabore
- 02. Molmo
- 03. Pelama
- 04. Kakoi
- 05. Yebil
- 06. Inebu
- 07. Mokai
- 08. Karaitem
- 09. Minate
- 10. Sibote
- 11. Miwaute
- 12. Wabute
- 13. Kupuom
- 14. Wigote
- 15. Kumnate
