= Wapei–Palei languages =

Branch of the Torricelli language family

Wapei–Palei
- Geographic distribution: eastern Sandaun Province, Papua New Guinea
- Linguistic classification: Torricelli: Wapei–Palei
- Subdivisions: Wapei; Palei

Language codes
- Glottolog: None
- The Torricelli languages as classified by Foley (2018)

The Wapei–Palei languages are spoken in mountainous regions of eastern Sandaun Province, Papua New Guinea. The Wapei languages and Palei languages together constitute a branch of the Torricelli language family according to Laycock (1975) (quoted from Foley 2018).
