= Aruek language =

Torricelli language of Papua New Guinea

Aruek
- Native to: Papua New Guinea
- Region: Sandaun Province
- Native speakers: 740 (2003)
- Language family: Torricelli: Kombian; Core; Aruek

Language codes
- ISO 639-3: aur
- Glottolog: arue1240
- ELP: Aruek

Aruek is a Torricelli language of Papua New Guinea. There is little data to classify it, and it is therefore left unclassified within Torricelli by Ross (2005). Dryer (2024), as cited in Drinfield (2024), classifies it as a Kombioic language.

There are no longer any speakers in the one village where it was spoken and people of that village say the language is now extinct.
