= Urat language =

Language spoken in Papua New Guinea

Urat
- Native to: Papua New Guinea
- Region: East Sepik Province
- Native speakers: 7,000 (2017)
- Language family: Torricelli: Urim; Urat

Language codes
- ISO 639-3: urt
- Glottolog: urat1244
- ELP: Urat

Urat (Wasep, Wusyep) is a Torricelli language spoken by a decreasing number of people in Papua New Guinea.

It is spoken by 2,480 people in Wasep Ngau (North Urat dialect), 2,060 in Wusyep Yihre (Central Urat dialect), 1,210 in Wasep Yam (South Urat dialect), and 550 in Wusyep Tep (East Urat dialect).

== Phonology ==
Unusually for a Papuan language, Urat has four voiceless liquids and semivowels, which are ɬ, r̥, w̥, and j̥. Urat consonants are:

p	t	ʧ	k	ʔ
ᵐb	ⁿd	ᶮʤ	ᵑg	
	s	ʃ		h
m	n	ɲ	ŋ	
	l			
	ɬ			
	r			
	r̥			
̥w		j		
w̥		j̥		

Urat vowels are:

i	u
e	o
a	

== Pronouns ==
Pronouns are:

	sg	pl
1	ŋam	poi
2	nin	yip
3m	kin	tiŋe
3f	ti	tiŋe
