= Dia language =

Torricelli language of Papua New Guinea

Dia
- Metru
- Native to: Papua New Guinea
- Region: Sandaun Province
- Native speakers: 1,800 (2003)
- Language family: Torricelli: Wapei; Dia

Language codes
- ISO 639-3: dia
- Glottolog: diaa1238
- ELP: Alu

Dia is a Torricelli language of Papua New Guinea.

== History ==
Both Dia and the closely related Sinagen language go by the names Alu and Galu.
