= Eitiep language =

Torricelli language of Papua New Guinea

Etiep
- Native to: Papua New Guinea
- Region: East Sepik Province
- Native speakers: 500 (2003)
- Language family: Torricelli: Kombian; Core; Etiep

Language codes
- ISO 639-3: eit
- Glottolog: eiti1240
- ELP: Eitiep

Etiep is a Torricelli language of Papua New Guinea. There is little data to classify it, and it is therefore left unclassified within Torricelli by Ross (2005). Dryer (2024), as cited in Drinfield (2024), classifies it as a Kombioic language.
