= Yau language (Torricelli) =

Torricelli language of Papua New Guinea

Yau
- Native to: Papua New Guinea
- Region: Sandaun Province
- Native speakers: 200 (2014)
- Language family: Torricelli: Wapei; Yau

Language codes
- ISO 639-3: yyu
- Glottolog: yaus1235
- ELP: Yau
- Coordinates: 3.52019°S 142.04211°E

Yau is a Torricelli language of Papua New Guinea. It is spoken in Senim village (3.52019°S 142.04211°E) of Tabale ward, East Wapei Rural LLG, Sandaun Province.
