= Wom language (Papua New Guinea) =

Torricelli language of Papua New Guinea

Wom
- Region: East Sepik Province, Papua New Guinea (12 villages)
- Native speakers: 4,300 (2003)
- Language family: Torricelli: Wom
- Writing system: Latin

Language codes
- ISO 639-3: wmo
- Glottolog: womp1235
- ELP: Wom

Wom or Wam is a Papuan language of the Torricelli language family spoken by 4,264 people (as of 2003) in East Sepik province, Papua New Guinea.

== Phonology ==
Consonants
	Labial	Alveolar	Dorsal	
	Labial	Alveolar	plain	labial
Plosive	p	t	k	kʷ
Prenasalized	ᵐb	ⁿd	ᵑg	ᵑgʷ
Fricative		s	h	
Nasal	m	n		
Approximant		l	j	w

- The prenasalised plosives /ᵐb ⁿd ᵑg ᵑgʷ/ are plain [b d g gʷ] word-initially.
- /s/ can be realized as [ts] word-initially.
- /h/ can be heard as [x] intervocalically.

Vowels
	Front	Central	Back
High	i		u
Mid	e		o
Low		a	

Additionally, the following diphthongs can be found: /ei/, /ai/, /oi/, /au/, /ou/.

Stress is phonemic.
