= One languages =

Torricelli language branch of Papua New Guinea

One
- West Wapei
- Geographic distribution: north-central Sandaun Province, Papua New Guinea
- Linguistic classification: Torricelli: One
- Subdivisions: One; Seta; Seti

Language codes
- Glottolog: west2580
- The Torricelli languages as classified by Foley (2018)

The One, Oneic, or West Wapei languages constitute a branch of the Torricelli language family. They are spoken in north-central Sandaun Province, Papua New Guinea.

== Languages ==
Foley (2018) lists:

One, Seta, Seti

== Vocabulary comparison ==
The following basic vocabulary words are from the Trans-New Guinea database, citing data from Laycock (1968) and SIL (2000):

The words cited constitute translation equivalents, whether they are cognate (e.g. kamóya, komoyo for “bone”) or not (e.g. alfoi, ŋkotelə for “tongue”).

gloss	One, Inebu	Seta	Seti
head	selə	sela; sila	səkon
hair		sila batalayo	
ear	tipi	tɩbɩli; təpəli	arpan
eye	namla	namana; naməna	nəŋka
nose	suwla	sulu; sülü	sünü
tooth	nala	nɛla; nelə	neːn
tongue	alfoi	ngctela; ŋkotelə	ŋkoten
leg	teu	teu	saten
louse	munola	təmofəl	təmpofənə
dog	paːla	balə; paːlə	paːn
bird	nawra	pəsiapa; pɩsapə	pəlisia
egg	amu	aːmo; gambu	tənna
blood	fampwi	soli	soro
bone	amla	kamóya	komoyo
skin	plapi	tapeo; tapio	naːni
breast	nimla	mommo; momo	momo
tree	silo	si	səno
man	mana	manə; oma	maŋko
woman	piːni	bɩni; pin	pəneno
sky		yebiti	
sun	ayre	kebɩli; kepli	koːfəni
moon	anini	anine; funmo	yinmon
water	faːla	mi	miː
fire	niːpi	sakul; sakulu	nep
stone	taːma	kuləbol; tumala	toːmu
road, path		plɛn	
eat		wune woyuye	
two	plale	pəla	pəna
