= Maimai languages =

Branch of the Torricelli language family

Maimai
- Geographic distribution: eastern Sandaun Province, Papua New Guinea
- Linguistic classification: Torricelli: Maimai

Language codes
- Glottolog: nucl1590
- The Torricelli languages as classified by Foley (2018)

The Maimai languages constitute a branch of the Torricelli language family. They are spoken just to the west of Nuku town in eastern Sandaun Province, Papua New Guinea (including in Maimai Wanwan Rural LLG).

== Languages ==
Maimai

- Beli, Laeko-Libuat
- Wiaki
- Siliput, Yahang, Heyo

== Pronouns ==
Pronouns in Maimai languages are:

Maimai pronouns
	Beli	Siliput	Yahang	Heyo
1s	ki	oi	ai	ai
2s	si	yi	is	is
3s	ofo	tən	apan	apan
1p	əfə	yep	epep	apap
2p		yip	ipip	ipip
3p	afa	təmoŋ	apam	

== Vocabulary comparison ==
The following basic vocabulary words are from Laycock (1968), as cited in the Trans-New Guinea database.

The words cited constitute translation equivalents, whether they are cognate (e.g. elktife, elaŋkitif for “tongue”) or not (e.g. nikiw, rakun, taŋən for “ear”).

gloss	Minidien	Heyo	Siliput	Yahang	Beli
head	etwun	utüwe	paroŋ	wuntəf	
ear	nikiw	rakun	taŋən	raŋkun	ŋətə
eye	napə	napelkə	oi	nampəl	satoʔ
nose	mohau	luweka	luwet	ruwot	suwopən
tooth	panikye	parkita	panəm	paniŋk	niŋo
tongue	ləhe	elktife	yansɨ	elaŋkitif	life
leg	etiyə	itikya	tiŋ	youpep	papaŋ
louse	lumum	hipəp		yaflin	
dog	panə	mpat	pat	mpat	pato
bird	pelhin	walfisa	hilít	felfis	walfun
egg	waltiye	laʔwo	yilhəf	lawo	lawiyen
blood	amkeʔ	wiyefa	wuji	wiyef	kuijwẽ
bone	loki	yefa	lokɨ	yefa	loknwẽ
skin	kirkeʔ	halipa	purko	halip	noʔoŋ
breast	mapi	maka	mayr	may	mapi
tree	lowɨ	lowə	lou	lou	lowo
man	məsən	mohon	matan	mukun	masən
woman	nuka- pyene	nuweteʔ	yukətet	nuwot	sakwoto
sun	amwo	fala	olok	fala	watli
moon	auniye	onifəʔ	aune	kwonif	waluko
water	supɨ	hipelə	sifyer	himpel	ite
fire	yakel	yafa	ya	yaʔaf	safi
stone	alpɨl; kitampa	paleka	wotə	wətə́f	kalkopo
two	yatowiye	oloʔw	wuríkrŋ	kolou	wosoŋ
