= Yapunda language =

Torricelli language of Papua New Guinea

Yapunda
- Yeri
- Native to: Papua New Guinea
- Region: Sandaun Province
- Native speakers: (60 cited 2000)
- Language family: Torricelli: Wapei; Yapunda

Language codes
- ISO 639-3: yev
- Glottolog: yapu1240
- ELP: Yeri

Yapunda, or Yeri, is a Torricelli language of Papua New Guinea.

Yeri is a language estimated to be spoken by 100-150 people. The speakers with the most proficiency are generally 40 years of age or older. The speakers who make up the younger demographics tend to either speak a more simplified version of the language or favor the use of Tok Pisin, an English creole, which is the universal language used with neighboring villages.

The village of Yeri is made up of a variety of hamlets along the Om river. Located in the Torricelli mountains, the village was originally deeper in the forest. Most village members decided to relocate nearer to the river, while a few stayed behind and continued habitation in the forest.

The Yeri village is structured as a patrilineal clan system. As of 2012, there were seven clans within the village. There is a history of bride exchange between villages and clans, with patrilocal residence following marriage.

== Language status ==
The Yeri language is considered moribund, or severely endangered. Yeri is not being passed down to younger generations and the existing speakers are declining at a rapid rate.

It is estimated by UNESCO that 10–99 speakers remain.

== Vowels and consonants ==
The Yeri language has five vowel phonemes, all shown in the chart below. Two of these phonemes, /i/ and /u/, have both glide and vowel allophones. When vowels are unstressed, they are shorted usually to the point of complete deletion.

	Front	Central	Back
High	i		u
Mid	e		o
Low		a	

Yeri has 13 consonants in addition to the five vowels already in its phoneme inventory. There are three plosives, one fricative, three nasals, and three approximates.

	Labial	Alveolar	Palatal	Velar
Plosives	p, b	t, d		k, g
Nasals	m	n		ŋ
Fricatives		s		
Approximants	(w)	l, r	(j)	ɰ

Two of the approximants that are in parentheses, [j] and [w], are analyzed as allophones of their corresponding vowels /i/ and /u/. While they are shown in the table, they are not considered consonant phonemes because of their distribution in vocalic position.

== Grammar ==
Yeri exhibits the basic word order of SVO (Subject, Verb, Object). In text, OV is more common.

Overt number marking usually occurs through suffixation, which means that a morpheme is attached to the end of a root. In this case, it attaches to the noun.

The Yeri language only has lexical items for the numerals 'one' and 'two.' Multiples of five are made by combining the lexical items for 'hand' and 'foot', where one hand corresponds to 'five,' two hands to 'ten,' two hands one foot to 'fifteen,' and so on. The lexical items for 'hand' and 'foot' can also be strung together with the numerals to create numbers that are between intervals of five. For example, the number 9 is constructed as hɨlogɨl woli wiam wiam, where hɨlogɨl woli translates as 'hand' and wiam translates as 'two.' So, the phrase for the number 9 directly translated to English would be 'hand two two.'

In Yeri, gender is only marked on third person nouns. Yeri distinguishes three genders: masculine, feminine, and inanimate. Gender is almost never distinguished in the plural.

Yeri observes two distinct types of questions, polar and alternative. Polar questions are marked by either a clause final morpheme or rising intonation. Alternative questions are marked by the use of a conjunction, such as 'or'.

There is no passive voice construction in the language. Yeri does have an applicative construction for benefactives and locatives which uses infixes that index objects as opposed to the prefixes that index objects which are used in the basic voice construction.

For an example of the basic voice transitive construction, see the example below. The example sentences use Leipzig Glossing Rules.

te-Ø sɨsekia kɨ w-y-aria yem

3-SG.F trick already 3SG.F-2-do.R 2PL

'She was lying to you (pl).'

Compare the prefix y- for the object 'you (pl)' of the above sentence with the infix <ne> for the object 'fish' in the applicative example below. The applicative itself, 'us' in this example, does use the prefixes that index objects.

ye ta n-w-a<ne>gutɨ nanu-la hebi

2SG FUT 2SG-1PL-burn.R<SG.M> fish-SG 1PL

'You (sg) will cook us fish.'

Yeri uses juxtaposition with no overt morpheme corresponding to English 'and' to coordinate argument clauses. This construction is used for complex sentences. Juxtaposition is also used for noun phrase coordination.

Possession in Yeri is achieved through an adnominal genitive pronoun or through juxtaposition. The juxtaposition form is dependent on the order of the possessor and the possessee.

== Code Switching in Yeri ==
Some speakers use a 'mountain language' when in the forest. It features a different vocabulary than the standard. This special vocabulary is used due to a belief that the special nominal forms for certain referents will ward off the bad spirits which inhabit the mountains. Hunters and inhabitants of the forest observe this practice to prevent danger. The known register for this vocabulary is limited.
