= Maimai Wanwan Rural LLG =

Local-level government in Papua New Guinea

- Location within Papua New Guinea
- Coordinates: 3.685253°S 142.365984°E
- Country: Papua New Guinea
- Province: Sandaun Province
- Time zone: UTC+10 (AEST)

Maimai Wanwan Rural LLG is a local-level government (LLG) of Sandaun Province, Papua New Guinea. Maimai languages are spoken in the LLG.

== Wards ==
- 01. Yimin
- 02. Nau'alu
- 03. Gamu/Ulap
- 04. Yimut
- 05. Wundu
- 06. Yimauwi
- 07. Yauwo
- 08. Maimai
- 09. Aimukuli
- 10. Mukili
- 11. Yulem
- 12. Yemeraba
- 13. Wemil
- 14. Leiko
- 15. Waniwomoko
