= Kombio language =

Torricelli language of Papua New Guinea

Kombio
- Native to: Papua New Guinea
- Region: East Sepik Province
- Ethnicity: Kombio (Akwun)
- Native speakers: 3,000 (2003)
- Language family: Torricelli: Kombian; Core; Kombio
- Dialects: Mwi; Wampukuamp; Yanimoi; Wampurun

Language codes
- ISO 639-3: xbi
- Glottolog: komb1272
- ELP: Kombio

Kombio is a Torricelli language spoken by a decreasing number of people in Papua New Guinea, as people shift to Tok Pisin. It also goes by the name Endangen. The Mwi dialect is divergent, but there is some degree of difficulty in comprehension between other major dialects as well (Wampukuamp, Yanimoi, Wampurun).

Dryer (2024), as cited in Drinfield (2024), classifies it as a Kombioic language.

== Pronouns ==
Kombio pronouns are:

person	singular	dual	paucal	plural
1st	apm	antie	antarko	ant
2nd	yikn	yipmuie	yipmarko	yipm
3rd	kil	tuwie	tuarko	ti

== Bibliography ==
- Henry, Joan. 1992. Kombio Grammar Essentials. Summer Institute of Linguistics.
