= Torricelli languages =

Language family in Papua New Guinea

Torricelli
- Torricelli Range – Sepik Coast
- Geographic distribution: Torricelli Range and coast, northern Papua New Guinea (East Sepik, Sandaun, and Madang provinces)
- Linguistic classification: One of the world's primary language families
- Subdivisions: Arapesh; Urim; Maimai; Wapei; Palei; One (West Wapei); Monumbo; Tayap–Marienberg

Language codes
- Glottolog: nucl1708 Nuclear Torricelli
- The Torricelli languages as classified by Foley (2018)

The Torricelli languages are a family of about fifty languages of the northern Papua New Guinea coast, spoken by about 80,000 people. They are named after the Torricelli Mountains. The most populous and best known Torricelli language is Arapesh, with about 30,000 speakers.

They are not clearly related to other Papuan language families; however, attempts have been made to establish external links. The most promising external relationship for the Torricelli family is the Sepik languages. (In reconstructions of both families, the pronouns have a plural suffix *-m and a dual suffix *-p.)

C.L. Voorhoeve (1987) has proposed that they are related to the North Halmahera languages and most of the languages of the Bird's Head Peninsula, thus forming the easternmost extension of the postulated West Papuan family.

== History ==
The Torricelli languages occupy three geographically separated areas, evidently separated by later migrations of Sepik-language speakers several centuries ago. Foley considers the Torricelli languages to be autochthonous to the Torricelli Mountains and nearby surrounding areas, having been resident in the region for at least several millennia. The current distribution of Lower Sepik-Ramu and Sepik (especially Ndu) reflects later migrations from the south and the east. Foley notes that the Lower Sepik and Ndu groups have lower internal diversity comparable to that of the Germanic and Romance languages, while internal diversity within the Torricelli family is considerably higher.

== Typological overview ==
=== Syntax ===
The Torricelli languages are unusual among Papuan languages in having a basic clause order of SVO (subject–verb–object); in contrast, most Papuan languages have SOV order. It was previously believed that the Torricelli word order was a result of contact with Austronesian languages, but Donohue (2005) believes it is more likely that SVO order was present in the Torricelli proto-language.

Torricelli languages display many typological features that are direct opposites of features typical in the much more widespread Trans-New Guinea languages.

- Torricelli: prepositions, SVO, left-branching
- Trans-New Guinea: postpositions, SOV, right-branching

However, Bogia and Marienberg languages have SOV word order and postpositions, likely as a result of convergence with Lower Sepik-Ramu and Sepik languages, which are predominantly SOV.

Torricelli languages also lack clause chaining constructions, and therefore have no true conjunctions or clause-linking affixes. Clauses are often simply juxtaposed.

=== Nouns ===
In Torricelli and Lower Sepik-Ramu languages, phonological properties of nouns can even determine gender.

Like in the Yuat and Lower Sepik-Ramu languages, nouns in Torricelli languages are inflected for number, which is a typological feature not generally found in the Trans–New Guinea, Sepik, Lakes Plain, West Papuan, Alor–Pantar, and Tor–Kwerba language families.

== Classification ==
Wilhelm Schmidt linked the Wapei and Monumbo branches, and the coastal western and eastern extremes of the family, in 1905. The family was more fully established by David Laycock in 1965. Most recently, Ross broke up Laycock and Z'graggen's (1975) Kombio branch, placing the Kombio language in the Palei branch and leaving Wom as on its own, with the other languages (Eitiep, Torricelli (Lou), Yambes, Aruek) unclassified due to lack of data. Usher tentatively separates Monumbo, Marienberg, and the Taiap (Gapun) language from the rest of the family in a 'Sepik Coast' branch.

- Torricelli
  - Sepik Coast
    - Marienberg branch: Bungain, Wiarumus (Mandi), Muniwara (Juwal), Urimo, Kamasau, Elepi, Buna
    - Monumbo branch (see)
    - Taiap
  - Torricelli Range
    - Wom
    - Arapesh branch (see)
    - Maimai branch: Nambi (Nabi), Wiaki (Minidien), Beli, Laeko, Maimai proper (Siliput, Yahang–Heyo)
    - West Wapei branch: Seti, Seta, One (a dialect cluster)
    - Wapei branch: Gnau, Yis, Yau, Olo, Elkei, Au, Yil, Ningil, Dia–Sinagen (both Alu, Galu), Yapunda, Valman
    - Palei branch: Urim, Urat, Kombio, Agi, Aruop, Wanap (Kayik), Amol (Alatil, Aru), Aiku (Ambrak, Yangum)

=== Foley (2018) ===
Foley (2018) provides the following classification.

- Torricelli
  - Bogia group
    - Mambuwan (Monumbo)
    - Lilau
  - Marienberg Hills group
    - Buna, Blabla (Elapi / Samap)
    - Kamasau
    - Bungain
    - Muniwara, Urimo, Mandi (Wiarumus)
  - Arapeshan group: Mountain Arapesh (Bukiyip), Southern Arapesh (Muhiang / Mufian), Bumbita (Weri), Abu'
  - Urim group: Urim, Urat, Kombio, etc.
  - Maimai group
    - Beli, Laeko-Libuat
    - Wiaki
    - Siliput, Yahang, Heyo
  - Wapei-Palei group
    - Wapei group: Yis, Yau, Olo, Elkei, Au, Yil, Alu, Ningil, Gnau, Yapunda, Walman (Valman)
    - Palei group: Nambi, Agi, Aruop (Srenge), Kayik, Aiku, Braget, Aru, Ambrak
  - One group: One, Seta, Seti, etc.

Foley rejects Laycock's (1975) Kombio-Arapeshan grouping, instead splitting up into the Arapesh and Urim groups.

=== Glottolog 4.8 ===
Glottolog 4.8 presents the following classification for the "Nuclear Torricelli" languages:

- Nuclear Torricelli
  - Beli (Papua New Guinea)
  - Kombio–Arapesh–Urat (10 languages)
  - Laeko–Libuat
  - Marienberg (7 languages)
  - Nuclear Maimai (3 languages)
  - Gnau (unclassified)
  - Urim
  - Wapei–Palei (22 languages)
  - West Wapei (8 languages)
  - Wom (Papua New Guinea)

In addition, Hammarström et al. do not accept the placement of the Bogia languages within Torricelli, stating that "no evidence [for this] was ever presented".

=== Dryer (2024) ===
Matthew Dryer (2024), as cited in Drinfield (2024), classifies the Torricelli languages as follows.

- Torricelli
  - West Torricelli
    - Wapei
    - Maimai
    - Palei
    - Kombio–Arapesh
    - Oneic
    - Urim
  - East Torricelli
    - Marienberg
    - Bogia
    - Tayap

== Pronouns ==
The pronouns Ross (2005) reconstructs for proto-Torricelli are

singular	proto-Torricelli	dual	proto-Torricelli	plural	proto-Torricelli
I	*ki	we two	*ku-p	we	*ku-m, *əpə
thou	*yi, *ti	you two	*ki-p	you	*ki-m, *ipa
he	*ətə-n, *ni	they two (M)	*ma-k	they (M)	*ətə-m, *ma, *apa-
she	*ətə-k, *ku	they two (F)	*kwa-k	they (F)	*ətə-l

Foley (2018) reconstructs the independent personal pronouns *ki 'I' and *(y)i 'thou', and *(y)ip 'you (pl)'. Foley considers the second-person pronouns to be strong diagnostics for determining membership in the Torricelli family.

Foley (2018) reconstructs the following subject agreement prefixes for proto-Torricelli.

	sg	pl
1	*k-	
2		
3m	*n-	*m-
3f	*w-	*m-

== Cognate sets ==
A cognate set for 'louse' in Torricelli languages as compiled by Dryer (2022):

Language (group)	louse
Marienberg	nəmi, ɲumo, ɲɛm, ɲimi
Central Wapei	nəmk, nəmeiləm, nimim
East Wapei	nəmaŋgar, namkar
Wanap	ɲiməl
Urat	ŋumbu
Kombio	ɲumək, niumukn, ɲumukŋun
Arapeshan	numunəl, nəmaŋgof
Wom	numulɛ
West Palei	ɲmulol
Urim	nmin
Maimai	yomata
East Palei	ymunə, ymul
West Wapei	muni, moni, munola

== See also ==
- Papuan languages

== Bibliography ==
- Donohue, Mark (2005). "Word order in New Guinea: dispelling a myth". Oceanic Linguistics. 44 (2): 527–536. doi:10.1353/ol.2005.0033. S2CID 38009656.
- Laycock, Donald C. 1968. Languages of the Lumi Subdistrict (West Sepik District), New Guinea. Oceanic Linguistics, 7 (1): 36-66.
- Ross, Malcolm (2005), "Pronouns as a preliminary diagnostic for grouping Papuan languages", in Andrew Pawley; Robert Attenborough; Robin Hide; Jack Golson (eds.), Papuan pasts: cultural, linguistic and biological histories of Papuan-speaking peoples, Canberra: Pacific Linguistics, pp. 15–66
