= Matthew Dryer =

American linguist

- Scientific career
- Fields: Linguistics
- Institutions: State University of New York at Buffalo

Matthew S. Dryer is a professor of linguistics at the State University of New York at Buffalo who has worked in typology, syntax, and language documentation. He is best known for his research on word order correlations, which has been widely cited. He is one of the editors of the World Atlas of Language Structures. His research has also analyzed various definitions of markedness as they may apply to word order. He has done original research on Kutenai. As of 2024, he is currently doing research (in conjunction with Lea Brown) on a number of languages of Papua New Guinea, among them the Torricelli languages (including Walman and others).
