= List of ethnic groups of West Papua =

List of ethnic groups in West Papua, Indonesia:

== List ==
Ethnic group	Linguistic classification	Regency	Districts and villages	Clans and subgroups
Arfak	East Bird's Head	Pegunungan Arfak		Sougb, Hatam, Moire, Meyah
Borai	East Bird's Head	Manokwari		Mansim
Numfor Doreri	Austronesian	Manokwari	Manokwari Timur District: Pasir Putih and Mansinam villages, and Lemon Island	Rumfabe, Rumadas, Rumsayor, Rumbekwan, Rumakeuw, Rumander, Rumbobiar, Rumbruren, Rumbrawer, Burwos
Hatam	East Bird's Head	Pegunungan Arfak	Menyambouw District, Anggi District, Anggi Dida District, Catubouw District, and Hingk District	Ayok, Aibu, Dowansiba, Insen, Indouw, Iwou, Katebu, Meindodga, Mandacan, Muid, Nuham, Rienggup, Sayori, Saiba, Saroi, Towansiba, Tibiai, Ullo, Warfandu, Wonggor
Hatam	East Bird's Head	Manokwari	Manokwari Barat District, Manokwari Selatan District, Tanah Rubuh District, Warmare District, Prafi District	Ayok, Aibu, Dowansiba, Insen, Indouw, Iwou, Katebu, Meindodga, Mandacan, Muid, Nuham, Rienggup, Sayori, Saiba, Saroi, Towansiba, Tibiai, Ullo, Warfandu, Wonggor
Hatam	East Bird's Head	Manokwari Selatan	Oransbari District: Masabui 1 and Masabui 2 villages. Ransiki District: Sabri village.	Anari, Demhi, Debri, Kawey, Mandacan, Sayori, Waran
Irarutu	Austronesian	Kaimana	Arguni District: Minggir, Aru, Kafuryai, Warmenu, Egarwara, Warua, Tugunawa, Rafa, Fiduma, Rauna, Sumun, Wanggita, Ukiara, Warwarsi, Bovuer, Mahua, Jawera, Rofada, Waromi, Tanusan, Urisa, Mandiwa, Werafuta, Nagura, and Seraran villages	Anofa, Auri, Agasar, Bogra, Bari, Bretne, Baefa, Durye, Drufne, Eria, Erejira, Egu, Fiamberi, Farisa, Furu, Fandi, Fenetiruma, Faiwine, Fimbay, Fargara, Furima, Furu, Jawi, Kuyami, Kurita, Kambeso, Kirwa, Moninggue, Muda, Masumbau, Manggara, Murmana, Mamaroma, Mangku, Mosmafa, Nafunari, Nafuni, Neba, Nega, Nyai, Nimbafu, Naisima, Obay, Puarada, Qurais, Riyentada, Riroma, Reasa, Ringgeti, Refideso, Raya, Rute, Ruwe, Ranggafu, Suruni, Sawewaranda, Sirini, Suafisa, Sabuku, Sarara, Sinafuna, Sirtefa, Sunum, Sasefa, Sifra, Siwari, Sigati, Sundai, Tefruam, Tumeka, Tanggarofa, Taboka, Uro, Ufnia, Wamena, Werfete, Waita, Wineruru, Wergiri, Watora, Wergiri, Waroma, Warasuwara, Wejeri, Wermeta, Werswira, Wania, Wersin, Wernana, Wagamona, Wanusanda
Irarutu	Austronesian	Teluk Bintuni	Babo District: Irarutu 3, Nusei, Kasira, Amutu, Modan, and Kanaisi villages. Aroba District: Wame village. Also in Farfurwar District.	Alkatiri, Fiawe, Furier, Furima, Furimbe, Fenetruma, Hiria, Irarutu, Kambya, Manuama, Nauri, Nafurbenan, Narimba, Oktova, Panatuama, Refideso, Sinai, Sevire, Wersin, Yawe
Koiwai	Austronesian	Kaimana	Kaimana District: Namatota and Bicari villages. Buruwai District: Pulau Adi and Nusa Ulang villages. Teluk Etna District: Kayu Merah village. Niraran District: Trikora village. Coa District: Sowa village. Also in Kaimana City and Roy District.	Alhamid, Amirbai, Aiturau, Boimasa, Faurier, Fenetiruma, Kastela, Kamakaula, Karafei, Laturau, Labaru, Lawai, Metua, Mandefa, Nasarau, Namufa, Natraka, Sawoka, Ratu, Simora, Samai, Soba, Sininggirau, Sirfefa, Sanggai, Sarai, Sirua, Ufnia, Umbayer, Werbay, Werfete, Waria, Watora, Waita, Wania, Yerfisi
Kuri	Austronesian	Kaimana	Teluk Arguni District and Arguni Bawah District: Pigo, Maskur, Tantura, Ergara, Kaimana, Tiwara, Owa, Bayeda, Moyana, Kokoroba, Nagura, Tugarni, Mahuwa, Fidumsa, Wawarsi, Tanusa, Warami, Baru, Tiwam, Mahua, Cowa, Bungsur, Weswasa, Burugrba, Sawi, Bobwer, Waho, Warmetia, Gusi, Afuafu, Burgerba, Mandiwa, Ukiara, Tuguwawa, Taner, Suga, Bufeur, Yainsei, Idoor, and Waromi villages.	Efara, Esuru, Fimbay, Farida, Fenetruma, Jaumina, Kurita, Mansumbau, Munwari, Murmana, Pigo, Refideso, Riensawa, Samaduda, Sasefa, Sisrafa, Syakema, Tatuta, Uhnia, Urbon, Werfete, Waita, Wania, Yoweni
Kuri	Austronesian	Teluk Bintuni	Kuri District	Efendire, Furier, Koke, Kuri, Pigo, Refideso, Rinsawa, Tatuta, Trorba, Urbon, Werbete, Yaumina
Madewana		Kaimana	Buruway District: Kambala, Edor, Yarona, Hia, Esania, Tairi, Gaka, and Guriasa villages	Aboda, Anofa, Borawa, Birawa, Bada, Betina, Etana, Fianberi, Goga, Kano, Kawada, Kurdow, Kawena, Keyabi, Kawa, Manuku, Manyao, Moyani, Metu, Moesa, Monefa, Maruka, Natraka, Natraka, Naroba, Nautari, Oyang, Onobora, Prautana, Sepbuana, Sikora, Sibi, Suban, Tana, Torabi, Uriana, Wanap, Yabana, Yabauwa
Mairasi	Mairasi	Kaimana	Interior villages: Umbran, Jamna Fata, Matna, Tarwata, Sara, Kasira, Orai, Wangatnau, Faranyau, and Sarifan. Coastal villages: Sisir, Foroma Jaya, Warasi, Lobo, Lomira, Morona, Nanggwaromi, Omay (May may), and Warika.	Ay, Anggua, Aturari, Anggua, Asua, Asafa, Angganun, Firema, Farinatai, Feranga, Furua, Iriyena, Inggrei, Jaisea, Jaanoug, Janoma, Jafata, Jaisona, Kaufara, Kamakaula, Manggara, Mura, Musmafah, Moy, Mufara, Meidana, Majarmau, Mejoi, Mefana, Natgoa, Nanguasai, Naruwu, Nasinyai, Nega, Nasua, Nambobo, Nensiani, Nasua, Nangewa, Namboru, Nauseni, Nambima, Naguara, Namama, Orani, Ojangai, Oruw, Ons, Raiya, Ratmanai, Safana, Surawi, Soafa, Sernau, Serai, Suparto, Sandoa, Siburari, Sisama, Sisauta, Sembay, Sefana, Sanau, Sanamuara, Sori, Sosik, Sinaonda, Tabnesa, Tavuani, Ulta, Usa, Usera, Wariensi, Yefa
Mairasi	Mairasi	Teluk Wondama	Naikere District: Sararti, Oya, Yabore, Wosimo, Undurara, and Inyora villages	Aruba, Efanda, Fet, Murai, Natama, Nealo, Payai, Sasuru, Sabarnau, Sibeda, Uryo, Urosa, Yafata
Maniwak		Teluk Wondama	Miei village, etc.	Ariks, Arumisore, Imburi, Karubuy, Mambor, Marani, Matani, Ramar, Rumadas, Sayori, Suabey, Torey, Wiay, Worisio, Yoteni
Matta		Fak-Fak	Kokas District: Brongkendik village	Bahba, Gredenggo, Genuni, Gewab, Gwasgwas, Gwaras, Hombore, Hirerenggi, Haremba, Hindom, Hegemur, Hombahomba, Iha, Kober, Krispul, Kabes, Mehran, Maredred, Patiran, Pihiwi, Rohorohmana, Temongmere, Tigtigweria, Taswa, Tuturop, Wagab, Weripang, Wouw
Mbaham	Trans-New Guinea	Fak-Fak	Fak-Fak Barat District: Werba, Wayati, Kwama, Kotam, Wanbar, Waserat, Sangram, Urat, Kriabisa, Tunas Gain, Saharei, Weni, Kinam, Kirawaswas, Wabu, Was. Also in Kokas District and Fak-Fak Timur District.	Bahamba, Bahba, Gwas-Gwas, Gewab, Gredenggo, Ginuni, Hia, Hindom, Heremba, Hegemur, Hiretrenggi, Iba, Kabes, Kranawama, Karamandondo, Muri, Ndadarma, Nimbitkendik, Phiwi, Tanggareri, Tanggahma, Tigtigweri, Wagab, Woy, Warpopor, Weripang
Meiah	East Bird's Head	Pegunungan Arfak	Testega District: Testega, Samenhon, Meifekeni, Isom, Jijiga (Jijga), Demoura, Asai Dua, Meijguji, Meindodga, Dumbre, Morumfeyi, Mofokeda, Meksi, Iba, and Meigahanua villages.	Asmorom, Derebi, Dowansiba, Isba, Iba, Ibori, Jijum, Igomu, Jouen, Koyani, Kasih, Mandacan, Mansaburi, Meksi, Meigahanau, Meindodga, Moktis, Mosyoi, Mosoimen, Pinder, Waramui, Wam, Yamebsi
Meiah	East Bird's Head	Manokwari	Sidei District: Kaironi village. Manokwari Utara District: Youm and Meinyunfoka villages.	Asmorom, Dowansiba, Farian, Ifanido, Iba, Kasih, Mandacan, Meindodga, Moktis, Mosyoi, Waramui, Wam
Miere	Mairasi	Kaimana	Teluk Etna District	Abujani, Karafey, Maramoy, Raifora, Raurukara
Miere 1 (Gunung/Kakak)	Mairasi	Teluk Wondama	Naikere District: Yabore village	Kabieta, Kambueta, Kombey, Kawieta, Sanggumata, Sibabata, Siwawata, Samieta
Miere 2 (Pantai/Adik)	Mairasi	Teluk Wondama	Rasiey District: Senderewoi village	Kawieta, Tambawa
Moire	East Bird's Head	Pegunungan Arfak	Mokwam District	Aibu, Ayok, Bikiou, Borai, Indow, Kob, Mansim, Pungwam, Rieinggup, Sayori, Tibiai, Ullo, Umpasut, Warfandu, Wonggor
Moire	East Bird's Head	Manokwari	Manokwari Selatan District: Mupi, Anggrisi, Warkapi and Warmarwai villages. Manokwari Barat District: Ayambori village. Warmare District: Warmare and Quintue villages.	Aibu, Ayok, Bikiou, Borai, Indow, Kob, Mansim, Pungwam, Rieinggup, Sayori, Tibiai, Ullo, Umpasut, Warfandu, Wonggor
Moru		Teluk Wondama	Wasior District: Moru village	Arumisore, Imburi, Marani, Subaey, Wiay
Moskona	East Bird's Head	Teluk Bintuni	Moskona Timur District (in Sumuy, Mesna, and Igomu villages), Mardey District, Masyeta District, Jagiro District, Moyeba District, and Mesna District	Asmorom, Eniba, Ibori, Iga, Imen, Isnai, Inyomara, Inyejom, Kaihiw, Maboro, Mambro, Mosum, Merestiem, Masakoda, Oroscomna, Osnag, Ogoney, Ortua, Patem, Sasior, Yarg, Yerkohok, Yamna
Napiti		Kaimana	Yamor District	Autami, Howna, Kotipura
Oburauw		Kaimana	Kambrau District: Waho, Wamesa, Kooy and Bumia villages. Arguni Bawah District: Wanoma and Inari villages. Kaimana District: Tanggaromi village.	Airabu, Abode, Busira, Baunu, Egana, Erau, Egana, Furai, Fenetiruma, Goga, Irini, Isoga, Kaisuna, Kubewa, Megi, Namsau, Nauseni, Ososawi, Oru, Sawi, Soba, Tumana, Umuru, Wayega
Roon	Austronesian	Teluk Wondama	Roon District: Yende, Niab, Inday, Sariay, Syabes, and Mena villages.	Awi, Akwan, Apomfires, Ajamiseba, Betay, Bosayor, Inuri, Kabo, Kayob, Kaum, Kereway, Masso, Marin, Manauw, Manupapami, Menarbu, Riburi, Rumadas, Sanoy, Seum, Waromi, Wonemseba, Wombay, Wamati, Waropen
Roswar		Teluk Wondama	Roswar District: Waprak, Nordiwar, Yomber, and Syeiwar	Iramiwir, Kobosibab, Sumuai, Waprak
Sebyar Kemberan	South Bird's Head	Teluk Bintuni	Kamunand District: Kali Tami I, Kali Tami 2, Bibiram, Kenara, and Maroro villages. Weriagar District: Weriagar, Weriagar Utara, and Mogotira villages.	Bauw, Braweri, Eren, Efum, Frabun, Gegetu, Hindom, Inai, Iribaram, Iriwanas, Kutanggas, Kinder, Patiran, Nabi, Sorowat, Tabiar, Urbun
Sebyar Damban	South Bird's Head	Teluk Bintuni	Tomu District: Tomu, and Ekam villages. Aranday District: Aranday village.	Bauw, Buranda, Imbimbong, Kaitam, Kosepa, Kokop, Kambori, Nawarisa, Rumatan, Tonoy
Sougb	Sougb	Pegunungan Arfak	Anggi District	Aiba, Ahoren, Ainusi, Asmorom, Bikiai, Bokoma, Horna, Iba, Iga, Igare, Inden, Iryo, Inyomusi, Kaidan, Mandacan, Mokiri, Mers, Saiba, Sayori, Trirbo, Tubes, Towansiba, Togue
Sougb	Sougb	Manokwari	Manokwari Barat District (in Ayambori village) and Warmare District	Aiba, Ahoren, Ainusi, Asmorom, Iba, Inden, Iryo, Inyomusi, Kaidan, Mandacan, Mokiri, Saiba, Sayori, Towansiba
Sougb	Sougb	Manokwari Selatan	Dataran Isim District: Tubes and Duhugesa villages	Ahoren, Ainusi, Iba, Inden, Inyomusi, Mandacan, Mokiri, Saiba, Sayori, Towansiba
Sougb Bohon	Sougb	Manokwari Selatan	Tahota District: Seimeba village	Arhita, Iba, Mokiri, Sayori, Sibena, Tubes, Trirbo
Sougb Raw	Sougb	Teluk Bintuni	Manimeri District: Atibo, Pasamai, and Botai villages. Bintuni District: Bintuni village.	Horna, Iba, Imeri, Irai, Menci, Onyo, Teinom, Tiri, Yetu
Sougb Wepu	Sougb	Teluk Wondama	Sougb Jaya District: Kaprus, Siresi, Yarmatum, Reyob, and Nuspairo villages. Rumberpon District: Iseren and Watitindau villages.	Arhita, Bikiai, Bokoma, Iba, Mokiri, Tubes, Sayori
Soviar		Teluk Wondama	Kuri Wamesa District: Dusner village	Arwakon, Imburi, Karuapi, Kamodi, Marani, Manupapami, Revideso, Sawasemariai, Somisa, Sanggemi, Urbuon, Yoweni
Sumuri	Trans-New Guinea	Teluk Bintuni	Sumuri District: Tofoi (district capital), Materabu Jaya, Forada, Agoda, Saengga, Tanah Merah Baru, Onar Lama, and Onar Baru villages	Agofa, Ateta, Bayuni, Dorisara, Dokasi, Fosa, Inanosa, Kamisofa, Muerena, Mayera, Masifa, Sodefa, Simuna, Soway, Siwana, Werifa, Wamay, Wayuri
Wamesa	Austronesian	Teluk Wondama	Windesi District: Windesi, Wamesa Tengah, Sombokoro, Wamesa Timur (Yopmeos), and Sandey villages. Sougb Jaya District: Kaprus village.	Kabiai, Karubui, Kayukatui, Marani, Manusawai, Paduai, Parairawai, Sawasemaryai, Windesi, Yoweni
Wamesa	Austronesian	Teluk Bintuni		Beberandi, Fimbay, Idorwai, Kawab, Masyemi, Manibui, Samaduda, Tatiri, Torembi, Wetebosi, Wekaburi, Wasyani
Warumba		Teluk Wondama	Kuri Wamesa District: Dusner village	Biowa, Baransano, Gowe, Horota, Imburi, Kapisa, Karuapi, Kamodi, Mansundoi, Manupapami, Mananian, Madiowi, Marani, Nelwan, Nunuari, Refideso, Sawesemariai, Sawaki, Soren, Teniwut, Ubinaro, Urbuo, Wiai, Wevori, Waidama, Warami, Yoteni
Waruri		Teluk Wondama	Kuri Wamesa District: Ambumi, Dusner, Muandaresi, Simiei, Nanimori, and Yerinusi villages	Ayomi, Bokwai, Dimawi, Enuap, Imburi, Karubui, Kayukatui, Kamodi, Kiri, Korei, Marani, Mariai, Mambor, Maniagasi, Ramar, Runaki, Samberi, Sayori, Sanggemi, Siweroni, Urus, Urio, Warami, Wopairi, Wakomuni, Wursano, Yoweni
Wondama	Austronesian	Teluk Wondama	Rasiey District: Isei, Senderawoi, Tandia, Sasirei, Rasiey, Webi, Uriemi, Torey, and Nggatu villages.	Sawaki, Torei, Warami, Yoteni

== See also ==
- List of ethnic groups of Southwest Papua
- Indigenous people of New Guinea
- Ethnic groups in Indonesia
- West Papua (province)
- List of districts of West Papua
- West Papuan languages
