= Sentani =

Sentani can refer to several things related to the Sentani region on the north coast of New Guinea in the province of Papua, Indonesia:

== Places ==
- District of Sentani, administrative centre in Jayapura Regency
- Sentani Kota, Sentani, Jayapura, administrative centre of Sentani District
- Dortheys Hiyo Eluay International Airport (formerly Sentani International Airport), the airport serving Jayapura
- Lake Sentani, a relatively large, oddly-shaped freshwater lake
- Sentani people

== Languages ==
- Sentani language, the language of the Sentani people
- Sentani languages
- East Bird's Head – Sentani languages
