= Stethotes =

Scientific classification
- Kingdom: Animalia
- Phylum: Arthropoda
- Clade: Pancrustacea
- Class: Insecta
- Order: Coleoptera
- Suborder: Polyphaga
- Infraorder: Cucujiformia
- Family: Chrysomelidae
- Subfamily: Eumolpinae
- Tribe: Typophorini
- Genus: Stethotes; Baly, 1867

Type species
- Pyropida elegantula Baly, 1864

Genus of leaf beetles

Stethotes is a genus of leaf beetles in the subfamily Eumolpinae. It is distributed in Southeast Asia and the Western Pacific.

== Species ==
Species include:

- Stethotes aenea Medvedev, 2009 – Western New Guinea: Highland Papua (Jayawijaya), West Papua (Arfak Mountains)
- Stethotes aethiops Medvedev, 2009 – Papua New Guinea (Morobe)
- Stethotes ajax Gressitt, 1966
- Stethotes apicalis Gressitt, 1966
- Stethotes apicicornis Baly, 1867 – Aru Islands
- Stethotes arachnoides Medvedev, 2009 – Western New Guinea: West Papua (Manokwari)
- Stethotes armata Medvedev, 2009 – Western New Guinea: Highland Papua (Jayawijaya)
- Stethotes atra Baly, 1867 – Western New Guinea: West Papua (Manokwari)
- Stethotes balyi Medvedev, 2009 – Yapen, Western New Guinea: Highland Papua (Jayawijaya)
- Stethotes basalis Jacoby, 1884 – New Guinea (Fly River)
- Stethotes basifasciata Medvedev, 2009 – Western New Guinea: Highland Papua (Jayawijaya)
- Stethotes basipennis Medvedev, 2009 – Western New Guinea: Highland Papua (Jayawijaya)
- Stethotes bicolor Gressitt, 1966
- Stethotes bryanti Medvedev, 2009 – Western New Guinea: Highland Papua (Jayawijaya)
- Stethotes carbonaria Medvedev, 2009 – Western New Guinea: West Papua (Manokwari)
- Stethotes carinata Medvedev, 2009 – Western New Guinea: Highland Papua (Jayawijaya)
- Stethotes coerulea Bryant, 1941 – New Britain
- Stethotes coerulescens Gressitt, 1966
- Stethotes consimilis Baly, 1867 – Bacan Islands, Buru
- Stethotes costipennis Medvedev, 2009 – Western New Guinea: West Papua (Arfak Mountains)
- Stethotes cryptorrhynchodes Gressitt, 1966
- Stethotes cyanella (Boisduval, 1835) – New Guinea
- Stethotes dentata Medvedev, 2009 – Papua New Guinea (Morobe)
- Stethotes elegantula (Baly, 1864) – Ambon
- Stethotes fulvicornis Medvedev, 2009 – Papua New Guinea (Morobe)
- Stethotes fulvilabris Lefèvre, 1890 – Western New Guinea: West Papua (Manokwari)
- Stethotes granulifrons Medvedev, 2009 – Western New Guinea: Highland Papua (Jayawijaya)
- Stethotes gressitti Medvedev, 2009 – Western New Guinea: West Papua (Arfak Mountains)
- Stethotes hirticollis Medvedev, 2009 – Western New Guinea: Highland Papua (Jayawijaya)
- Stethotes hirtipes Jacoby, 1884 – New Guinea (Fly River)
- Stethotes integra Jacoby, 1905 – Papua New Guinea (Central), Western New Guinea (Cyclops Mountains)
- Stethotes iriana Medvedev, 2009 – Batanta
- Stethotes jacobyi Medvedev, 2009 – Western New Guinea: Southwest Papua (Sorong)
- Stethotes javarere Gressitt, 1966
- Stethotes kiungae Gressitt, 1966
- Stethotes laeana Gressitt, 1966
- Stethotes laevicollis Medvedev, 2009 – Papua New Guinea (Morobe)
- Stethotes lata Gressitt, 1966
- Stethotes lateralis (Baly, 1864) – Aru Islands, Borneo
- Stethotes latifasciata Gressitt, 1966
- Stethotes leleta Gressitt, 1966
- Stethotes longicollis Baly, 1867 – Java
- Stethotes longimana Lefèvre, 1890 – Waigeo
- Stethotes loriae Jacoby, 1905 – Papua New Guinea (Central)
- Stethotes melastomae Gressitt, 1966
- Stethotes mimica Gressitt, 1966
- Stethotes minuta Jacoby, 1905 – Papua New Guinea (Central)
- Stethotes nigrescens Medvedev, 2009 – Western New Guinea: Highland Papua (Jayawijaya)
- Stethotes nigripalpis Medvedev, 2009 – Western New Guinea: Highland Papua (Jayawijaya)
- Stethotes nigritula Baly, 1867 – Western New Guinea: West Papua (Manokwari)
- Stethotes nigrocoerulea (Baly, 1864) – Seram
- Stethotes nigroviridis Jacoby, 1884 – Supirori, Biak
- Stethotes obscura Medvedev, 2009 – Western New Guinea: Highland Papua (Jayawijaya)
- Stethotes obscurata Medvedev, 2009 – Western New Guinea: West Papua (Arfak Mountains)
- Stethotes papuana Medvedev, 2009 – Papua New Guinea (Morobe)
- Stethotes pubifrons Weise, 1910 – Papua New Guinea (Sattelberg)
- Stethotes punctissima Gressitt, 1966
- Stethotes punctulata Bryant, 1950 – Yapen
- Stethotes riedeli Medvedev, 2009 – Papua New Guinea (Morobe)
- Stethotes rubripes Medvedev, 2009 – Western New Guinea: Highland Papua (Jayawijaya)
- Stethotes rubrofasciata Bryant, 1950 – Papua New Guinea (Madang), New Britain (Kokopo)
- Stethotes rufipes Bryant, 1946 – Fiji
- Stethotes rufonigra Maulik, 1929 – Samoa
- Stethotes rufula Medvedev, 2009 – Western New Guinea: Highland Papua (Yahukimo)
- Stethotes schawalleri Medvedev, 2009 – Western New Guinea: West Papua (Arfak Mountains), Highland Papua (Jayawijaya)
- Stethotes semicastanea Gressitt, 1966
- Stethotes setosa Gressitt, 1957 – Fiji
- Stethotes similis Gressitt, 1966
- Stethotes simonthomasi Gressitt, 1966
- Stethotes submetallica Gressitt, 1966
- Stethotes suturalis Bryant, 1950 – Papua New Guinea (Southern Highlands, Morobe)
- Stethotes sylvarum Gressitt, 1966
- Stethotes tarsalis Medvedev, 2009 – Western New Guinea: West Papua (Manokwari)
- Stethotes tarsata Baly, 1867 – Western New Guinea (Manokwari)
- Stethotes telnovi Medvedev, 2017 – Western New Guinea (Bird's Head Peninsula)
- Stethotes tristis Medvedev, 2009 – Western New Guinea: West Papua (Arfak Mountains)
- Stethotes virida Gressitt, 1966
- Stethotes viridissima Medvedev, 2009 – Papua New Guinea (Sandaun)

The following species have been moved to other genera:

- Stethotes bertiae Jolivet, Verma & Mille, 2007: moved to Acronymolpus
- Stethotes jourdani Jolivet, Verma & Mille, 2013: moved to Acronymolpus
- Stethotes mandjeliae Jolivet, Verma & Mille, 2010: moved to Taophila
