= Demta =

Demta may refer to:

- Demta people, an ethnic group from the Demta District in Papua, Indonesia
- Demta language, a language spoken by the Demta people
- Achaea demta, a species of moth found in South Africa and Eswatini
