= Tanah Merah =

Tanah Merah (Malay, 'Red Land') may refer to:

== Places ==
- Tanah Merah District, Kelantan, Malaysia
- Tanah Merah, Singapore
- Tanah Merah, Queensland, Australia
- Tanahmerah, Boven Digoel, South Papua, Indonesia
- Tanahmerah Bay, Jayapura, Papua, Indonesia

== Languages ==
- Sumuri language (Trans–New Guinea phylum)
- Tabla language (Sentani group)

== See also ==
- Tanah Merah language (disambiguation)
- Redland (disambiguation)
