= Tabla people =

Ethnic group in Indonesia

Tabla
Tepra or Tepera
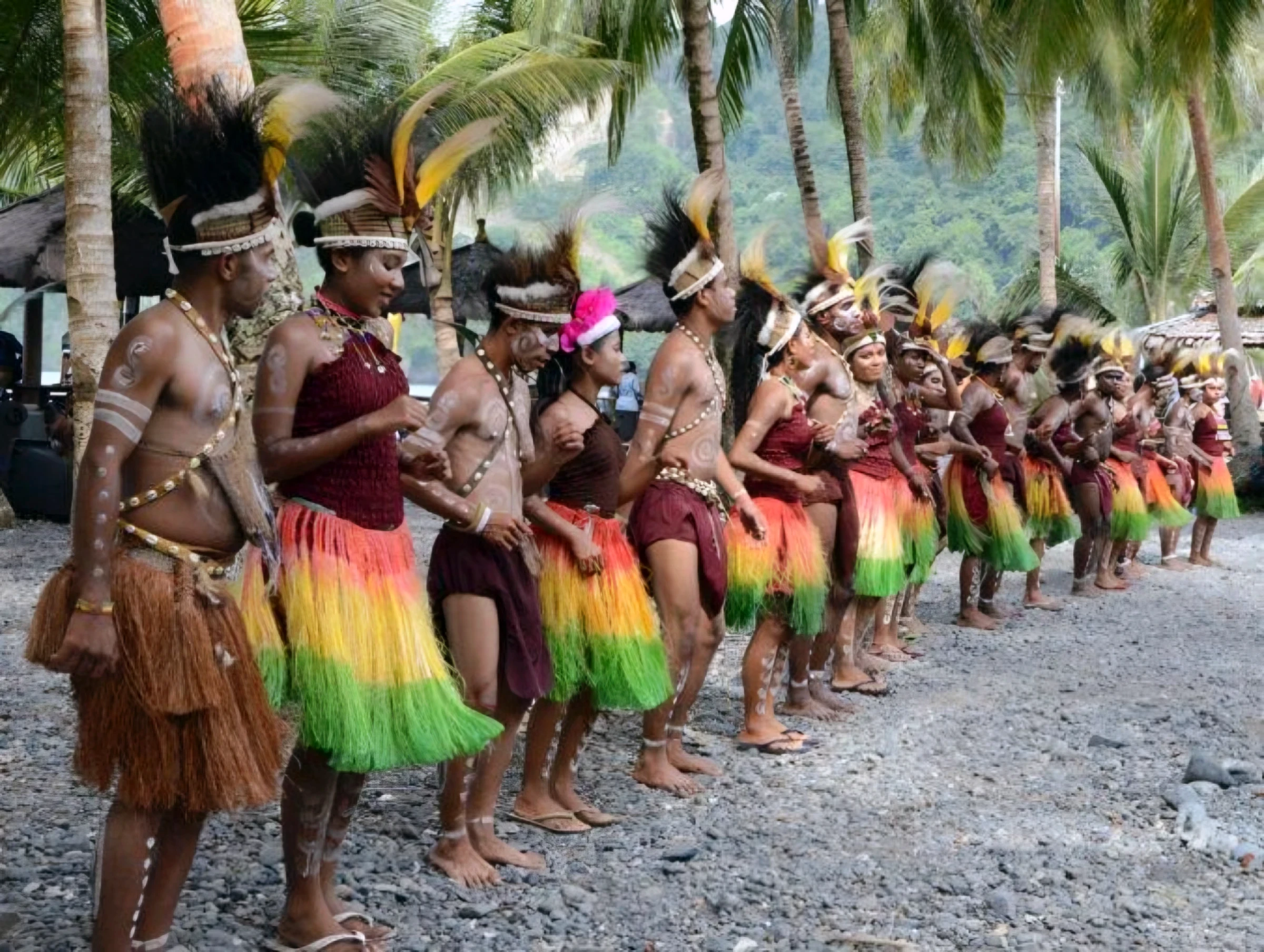
- Tabla dance from the village of Tablanusu, Depapre District

Total population
- 3,750

Regions with significant populations
- Indonesia (Jayapura Regency)

Languages
- Tabla language

Related ethnic groups
- Sentani, Demta

The Tabla people (Tabla: Tepra or Tepera) are an ethnic group who inhabit the Depapre District and surrounding areas in Jayapura Regency, Papua Province, Indonesia.

== Language ==
The Tabla people speak the Tabla language, which is divided into three dialects:

- Yokari in Yokari District, Jayapura Regency
- Central Tepera in Depapre District, especially in the villages of Tablanusu, Waya, and Tablasupa
- Tawano in the areas to the east of Depapre District, such as Yepase through Yongsu Desoyo in Ravenirara District.

== Traditions ==
=== Tiyaitiki ===
Tiyaitiki is the local sasi (conservation tradition) of the Tepera people, namely the knowledge of regulating, managing, using, and preserving the marine and coastal resources of the Tanah Merah Bay area. As with other sasi traditions, the community is forbidden from exploiting certain marine resources for a specified period. Other names for the practice are tiyaitikete among the Yokari people and dabom or takar among the Demta people.
