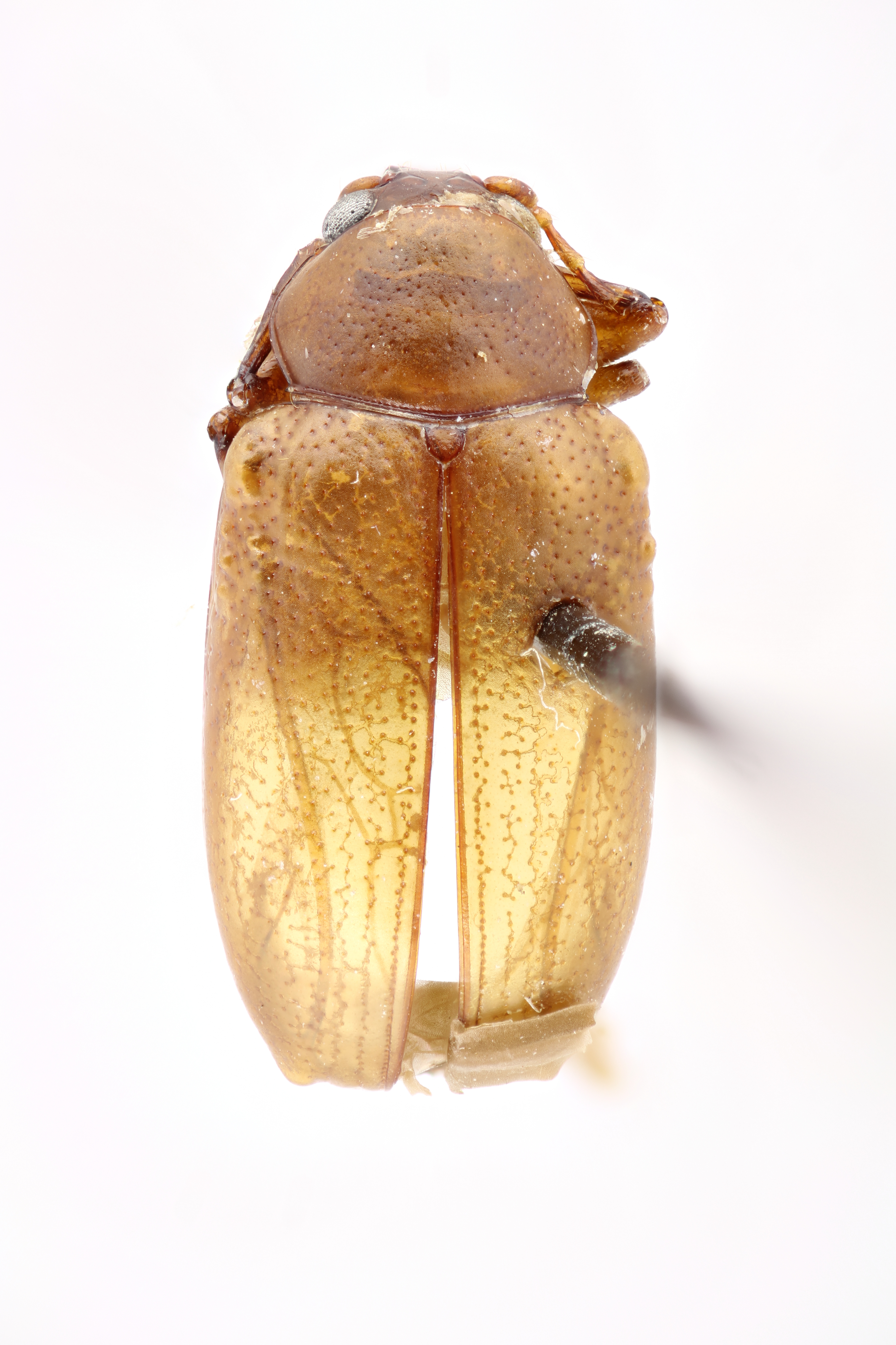
- Dematochroma norfolkiana

Scientific classification
- Kingdom: Animalia
- Phylum: Arthropoda
- Clade: Pancrustacea
- Class: Insecta
- Order: Coleoptera
- Suborder: Polyphaga
- Infraorder: Cucujiformia
- Family: Chrysomelidae
- Subfamily: Eumolpinae
- Tribe: Eumolpini
- Genus: Dematochroma; Baly, 1864

Type species
- Dematochroma picea Baly, 1864

= Dematochroma =

Genus of leaf beetles

Dematochroma is a genus of leaf beetles in the subfamily Eumolpinae. It is mostly distributed in New Caledonia, though it is also found on Lord Howe Island, Norfolk Island, Timor and Vanuatu. Adult beetles (usually less than 1 cm long) are often found at night feeding on leaves, and the larvae eat roots.

== Phylogeny ==
Recent phylogenetic analyses of Eumolpinae of the south Pacific suggest that Dematochroma is paraphyletic: the type species, the Lord Howe endemic D. picea, is placed in a clade including New Caledonian endemic genera Taophila and Tricholapita, which is sister to another clade including other New Caledonian Eumolpinae genera, the New Caledonian species of Dematochroma as well as the New Zealand endemic Atrichatus. Because of such findings, Gómez-Zurita and collaborators have preferred to transfer several New Caledonian species of Dematochroma to other genera. For instance, the genus Thasycles Chapuis, 1874, which was for a long time treated as a synonym of Dematochroma, was reinstated as a valid genus, and a new genus Dematotrichus was established for Dematochroma pilosa and closely related species.

== Species ==
- Dematochroma antipodum (Fauvel, 1862) – New Caledonia
- Dematochroma antipodumoides Jolivet, Verma & Mille, 2010 – Vanuatu
- Dematochroma culminicola (Heller, 1916) – New Caledonia
- Dematochroma difficilis (Heller, 1916) – New Caledonia
- Dematochroma doiana Jolivet, Verma & Mille, 2007 – New Caledonia
- Dematochroma helleri Jolivet, Verma & Mille, 2007 – New Caledonia
- Dematochroma howensis Jolivet, Verma & Mille, 2006 – Lord Howe Island
- Dematochroma lepros (Heller, 1916) – New Caledonia
- Dematochroma maculifrons (Heller, 1916) – New Caledonia
- Dematochroma norfolkiana Jolivet, Verma & Mille, 2006 – Norfolk Island
- Dematochroma picea Baly, 1864 – Lord Howe Island
- Dematochroma samuelsoni Jolivet, Verma & Mille, 2011 – New Caledonia
- Dematochroma shuteae Jolivet, Verma & Mille, 2006 – Norfolk Island
- Dematochroma sylviae Jolivet, Verma & Mille, 2010 – New Caledonia
- Dematochroma terastiomerus (Heller, 1916) – New Caledonia
- Dematochroma terminaliae Jolivet, Verma & Mille, 2010 – New Caledonia
- Dematochroma theryi Jolivet, Verma & Mille, 2010 – New Caledonia
- Dematochroma timorense Jacoby, 1894 – Timor

The following species are synonyms:

- Dematochroma poyensis Jolivet, Verma & Mille, 2010: synonym of Dematochroma theryi Jolivet, Verma & Mille, 2010
- Dematochroma soldatii Jolivet, Verma & Mille, 2010: synonym of Dematochroma antipodumoides Jolivet, Verma & Mille, 2010

The following species have been transferred to other genera:

- Dematochroma cancellata (Samuelson, 2010): transferred to Cazeresia, as synonym of Cazeresia striata (Jolivet, Verma & Mille, 2007)
- Dematochroma foaensis Jolivet, Verma & Mille, 2007: transferred to Rhyparida
- Dematochroma fusca Jolivet, Verma & Mille, 2007: transferred to Thasycles
- Dematochroma humboldtiana (Heller, 1916): transferred to Cazeresia
- Dematochroma laboulbenei (Montrouzier, 1861): transferred to Thasycles
- Dematochroma panieensis Jolivet, Verma & Mille, 2007: transferred to Thasycles
- Dematochroma pilosa Jolivet, Verma & Mille, 2007: transferred to Dematotrichus
- Dematochroma thyiana Jolivet, Verma & Mille, 2008: transferred to Cazeresia
