= Yamur Lake =

Lake in West Papua, Indonesia

- Danau Jamur
- Location within Western New Guinea
- Location: Yamor district, Kaimana Regency, West Papua, Indonesia
- Coordinates: 3.6696°S 134.9268°E
- Type: lake
- Max. length: 7.2 km (4.5 mi)
- Max. width: 9.4 km (5.8 mi)
- Surface area: 37.25 km^{2} (14.38 mi^{2})
- Surface elevation: 32 m (105 ft)
- Islands: 2

Yamur Lake (Indonesian: Danau Jamur), alternatively spelt Jamur Lake, is a tropical, low-altitude lake located at the base of the Bird's Neck Isthmus of Western New Guinea, in the Vogelkop-Aru lowland rain forests ecoregion. It lies in eastern Kaimana Regency in the Indonesian province of West Papua along the border with Central Papua province.

The lake is known as the home of an endemic fish species, the Yamur Lake grunter
