= IRH =

IRH or irh may refer to:

- Inverclyde Royal Hospital, a district general hospital in Greenock, Scotland
- irh, the ISO 639-3 code for Irarutu language, Bomberai Peninsula, Indonesia
