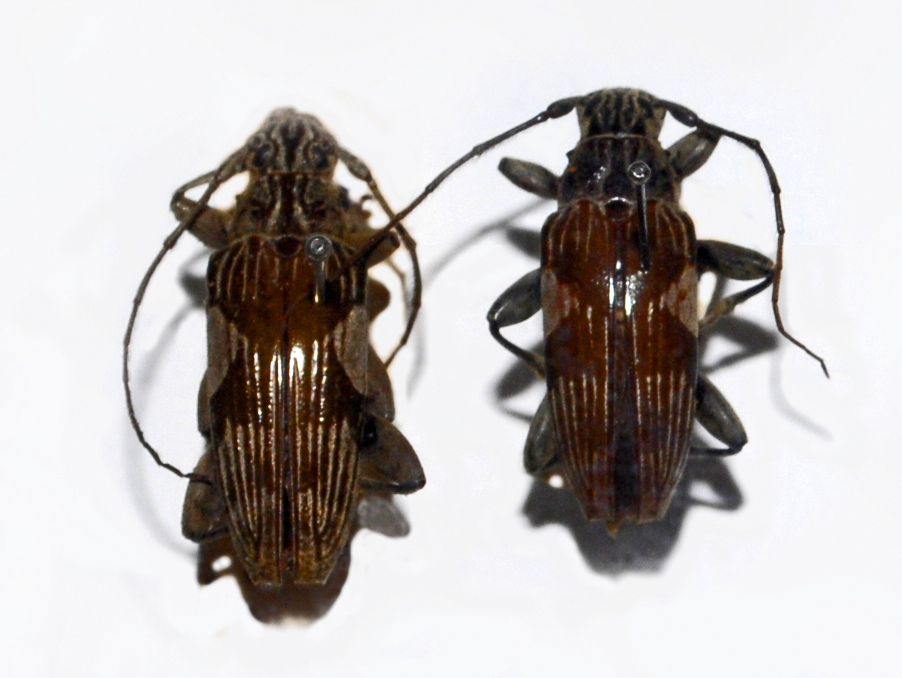
- Tmesisternus sulcatus. Mounted specimen

Scientific classification
- Kingdom: Animalia
- Phylum: Arthropoda
- Class: Insecta
- Order: Coleoptera
- Suborder: Polyphaga
- Infraorder: Cucujiformia
- Family: Cerambycidae
- Genus: Tmesisternus
- Species: T. sulcatus

Binomial name
- Tmesisternus sulcatus Aurivillius, 1911

Synonyms
- Tmesisternus pseudosulcatus Schwarzer, 1924

= Tmesisternus sulcatus =

Species of beetle

Tmesisternus sulcatus is a species of longhorn beetles belonging to the family Cerambycidae, subfamily Lamiinae.

== Distribution ==
This species can be found in Papua New Guinea (Cyclop Mountains).
