= Taophila =

Scientific classification
- Kingdom: Animalia
- Phylum: Arthropoda
- Clade: Pancrustacea
- Class: Insecta
- Order: Coleoptera
- Suborder: Polyphaga
- Infraorder: Cucujiformia
- Family: Chrysomelidae
- Subfamily: Eumolpinae
- Tribe: Eumolpini
- Genus: Taophila; Heller, 1916

Type species
- Taophila subsericea Heller, 1916

Genus of leaf beetles

Taophila is a genus of leaf beetles in the subfamily Eumolpinae. The genus is endemic to New Caledonia.

== Taxonomy ==
Taophila was first established in 1916 by the Austrian entomologist Karl Borromaeus Maria Josef Heller for a single described species, Taophila subsericea. The genus remained monotypic for nearly a century, until two further species were described in 2007. In 2010, the genus was revised by G. Allan Samuelson, who added another nine species.

In 2014, entomologists Jésus Gómez-Zurita and Anabela Cardoso made a morphological and molecular phylogenetic study of the genus, using the results to propose two new subgenera: Jolivetiana and Lapita. The subgenus Lapita was later found to be a junior homonym of the fly genus Lapita Bickel, 2002, and moreover the group has many morphological differences to Taophila s. str., so it was renamed to Tricholapita and elevated in rank to genus in 2020.

== Species ==
Taophila contains 21 species, which are divided into two subgenera:

- Subgenus Taophila Heller, 1916
  - Taophila bituberculata Platania & Gómez-Zurita, 2021
  - Taophila carinata Platania & Gómez-Zurita, 2021
  - Taophila corvi Samuelson, 2010
  - Taophila dapportoi Platania & Gómez-Zurita, 2021
  - Taophila davincii Platania & Gómez-Zurita, 2021
  - Taophila deimos Samuelson, 2010
  - Taophila draco Platania & Gómez-Zurita, 2021
  - Taophila goa Platania & Gómez-Zurita, 2021
  - Taophila hackae Platania & Gómez-Zurita, 2021
  - Taophila hydrae Samuelson, 2010
  - Taophila joliveti Samuelson, 2010
  - Taophila millei Samuelson, 2010
  - Taophila nigrans Jolivet, Verma & Mille, 2007
  - Taophila sagittarii Samuelson, 2010
  - Taophila samuelsoni Platania & Gómez-Zurita, 2021
  - Taophila scorpii Samuelson, 2010
  - Taophila sideralis Platania & Gómez-Zurita, 2021
  - Taophila subsericea Heller, 1916 (synonym: Taophila mandjeliae (Jolivet, Verma & Mille, 2010))
  - Taophila taaluny Platania & Gómez-Zurita, 2021
  - Taophila wanati Platania & Gómez-Zurita, 2021
- Subgenus Jolivetiana Gómez-Zurita & Cardoso, 2014
  - Taophila mantillerii Jolivet, Verma & Mille, 2007

Species now in Tricholapita Gómez-Zurita & Cardoso, 2020 (formerly the subgenus Lapita Gómez-Zurita & Cardoso, 2014 nec Bickel, 2002):

- Taophila aphrodita Gómez-Zurita, 2014
- Taophila atlantis Platania & Gómez-Zurita, 2019
- Taophila gaea Gómez-Zurita, 2014
- Taophila hermes Platania & Gómez-Zurita, 2019
- Taophila kronos Platania & Gómez-Zurita, 2019
- Taophila mars Samuelson, 2010
- Taophila oceanica Platania & Gómez-Zurita, 2019
- Taophila olympica Platania & Gómez-Zurita, 2019
- Taophila ouranos Platania & Gómez-Zurita, 2019
- Taophila riberai Platania & Gómez-Zurita, 2019
- Taophila tridentata Platania & Gómez-Zurita, 2019

T. cancellata Samuelson, 2010 was tentatively transferred to Dematochroma in 2014, then was proposed as a synonym of Dumbea striata in 2023, which was then transferred to the genus Cazeresia in 2025.
