= Sentani Kota, Sentani, Jayapura =

City in Papua, Indonesia

Sentani
- Location in Papua and Indonesia Sentani (Indonesia)
- Coordinates: 2°33′57.8844″S 140°30′20.6748″E
- Country: Indonesia
- Province: Papua
- Regency: Jayapura Regency

Area
  - Total: 7.94 sq mi (20.56 km^{2})
- Elevation: 308 ft (94 m)

Population (mid 2022 estimate)
  - Total: 24,482
  - Density: 3,084/sq mi (1,191/km^{2})
- Time zone: UTC+9 (Indonesia Eastern Standard Time)

Sentani Kota is a town (kelurahan) located in the district of Sentani, Jayapura Regency, Papua Province, Indonesia. It lies some 40 kms west of the city of Jayapura, and contains Sentani International Airport, the main port of entry for the province. The adjacent town (kelurahan) of Hinekombe - part of the same built-up area - is the location of the administrative seat of Sentani District, while Sentani District is the capital of Jayapura Regency. The town is located to the north of Lake Sentani and to the south of the Cyclops Mountains. In mid 2022 Sentani town had 24,482 inhabitants and Hinekombe town had 21,724 inhabitants.

== Transportation ==
Sentani is served by Sentani International Airport. The village is linked to Jayapura by a paved highway.

== Climate ==
Sentani has a tropical rainforest climate (Af) with moderate to heavy rainfall year-round.

Climate data for Sentani
Month	Jan	Feb	Mar	Apr	May	Jun	Jul	Aug	Sep	Oct	Nov	Dec	Year
Mean daily maximum °C (°F)	30.9 (87.6)	30.6 (87.1)	30.9 (87.6)	31.0 (87.8)	31.1 (88.0)	30.9 (87.6)	30.5 (86.9)	30.7 (87.3)	31.1 (88.0)	31.1 (88.0)	31.2 (88.2)	30.9 (87.6)	30.9 (87.6)
Daily mean °C (°F)	26.5 (79.7)	26.3 (79.3)	26.6 (79.9)	26.7 (80.1)	26.7 (80.1)	26.5 (79.7)	26.1 (79.0)	26.3 (79.3)	26.5 (79.7)	26.7 (80.1)	26.6 (79.9)	26.5 (79.7)	26.5 (79.7)
Mean daily minimum °C (°F)	22.2 (72.0)	22.1 (71.8)	22.3 (72.1)	22.4 (72.3)	22.4 (72.3)	22.1 (71.8)	21.8 (71.2)	21.9 (71.4)	22.0 (71.6)	22.3 (72.1)	22.1 (71.8)	22.2 (72.0)	22.2 (71.9)
Average precipitation mm (inches)	236 (9.3)	231 (9.1)	262 (10.3)	185 (7.3)	126 (5.0)	115 (4.5)	101 (4.0)	121 (4.8)	120 (4.7)	120 (4.7)	163 (6.4)	223 (8.8)	2,003 (78.9)
Source: Climate-Data.org
