= Demta people =

Ethnic group in Indonesia

Demta
Jou Warry, Sou Warry, Sowari, Tarpia
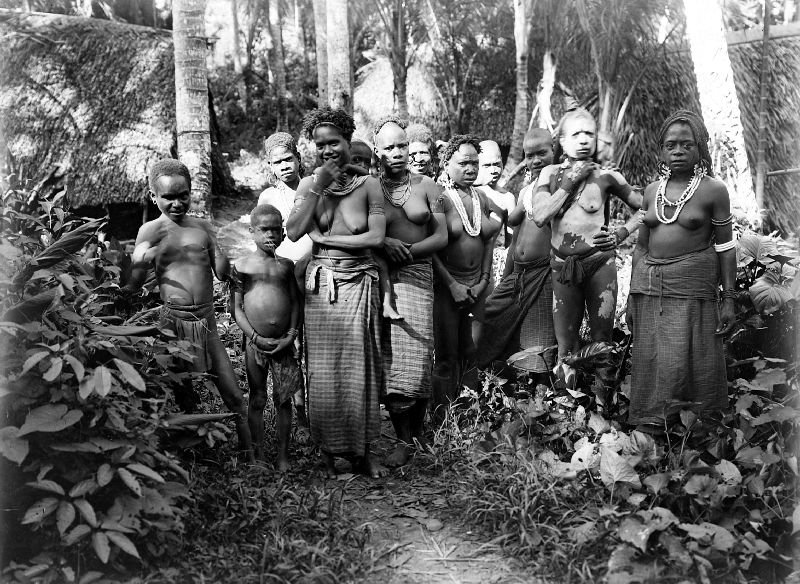
- Demta people, 1903

Total population
- Muris: 800 (1975); Tarpia: 560 (1975)

Regions with significant populations
- Indonesia (Jayapura Regency)

Languages
- Demta

Related ethnic groups
- Sentani, Nafri, Tabla

The Demta people (Demta: Jou Warry, Souw Warry, Sowari, or Tarpia) are an ethnic group inhabiting the Demta District, Jayapura Regency, Papua Province, Indonesia. Their population is around 800 people, while according to the Joshua Project the population of the Demta people, as measured by speakers of the Demta language, is 1,700 .

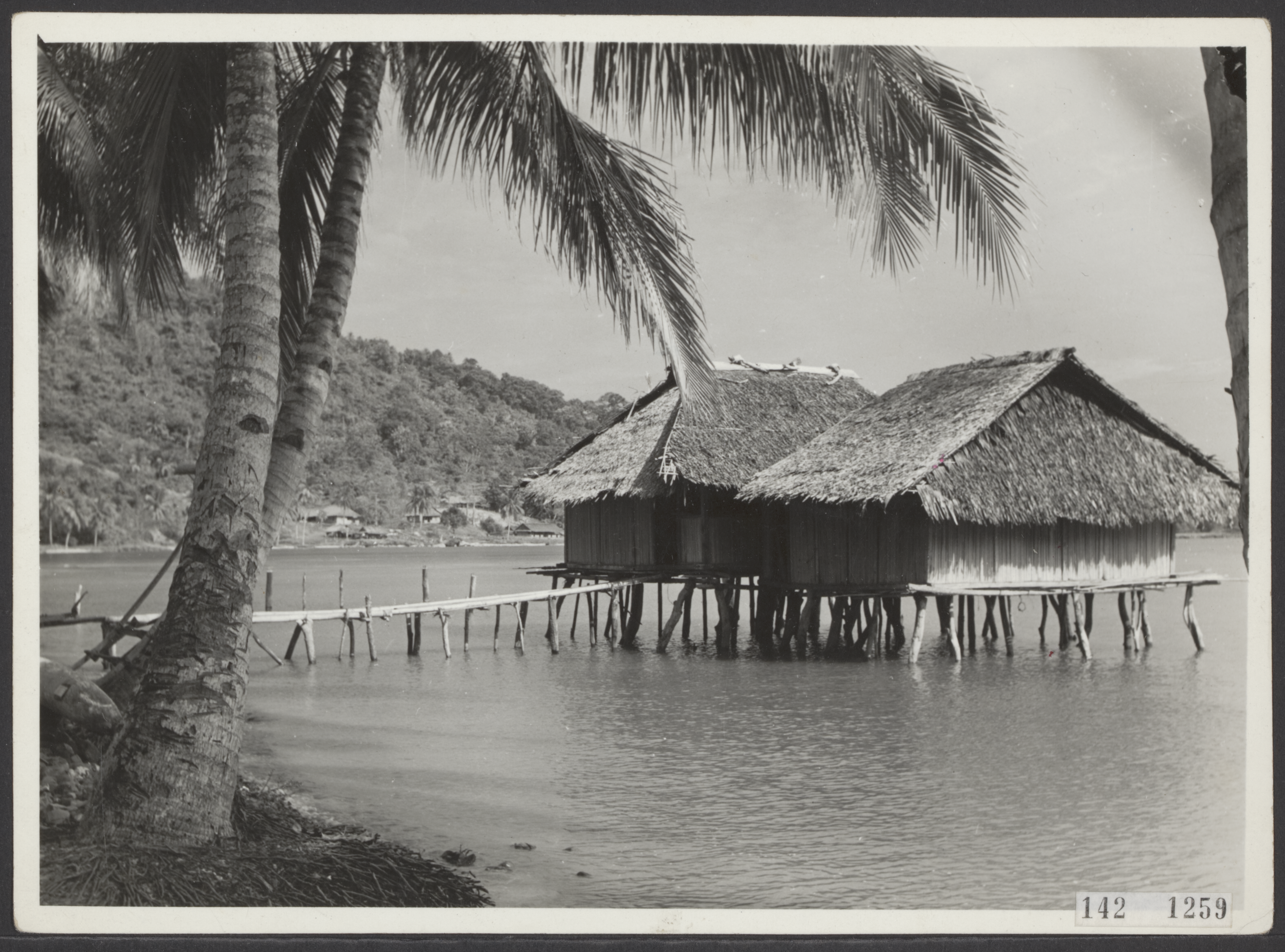
Stilt houses in Demta

== Customs ==
The indigenous Demta people are divided into three sub-tribes called the Souw, Warry, and Tarpi tribes. According to the traditional guidelines of the Demta traditional council, the highest authority lies in the customary government of each sub-tribe, which regulates social affairs within their traditional community life, including the use of natural resources, land ownership, customary rights, and marriage.

The traditional leader is called the Marar Mataun in the Souw sub-tribe, the Mataun Pan in the Warry sub-tribe, and the Mara Tamsu in the Tarpi sub-tribe. These leaders are regarded as God's representatives in everyday life and are considered noble and sacred figures. The position can be inherited, but only by descendants considered capable and wise.

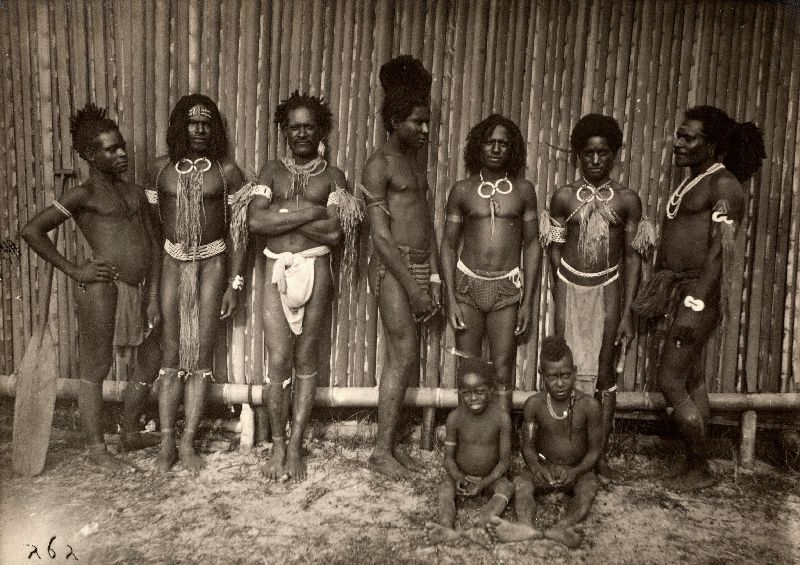
Young men of the Tarpi sub-tribe

=== Sub-tribes ===
- Souw, located in Muris Kecil village and Yakore village.
  - Families include: Murin, Sudumeru, Kopouw, Tare, Yaukwart, Arim, Yakore, Sobi, Karay, Mandat, Okobron, Pararem, and Burame.
- Warry, located in Demta village, Ambora, and Yougapsa.
  - Families include: Kawaipun, Arimodop, Dodop, Tiert, Darinya, Ebe, Karafir, Pisya, Papiri, Tunya, Kowan, Ipun, Usupar, and Ajam.
- Tarpia, located in Kamdera village.
  - Families include: Taurui, Wero, Bernifu, Kingso, Warmesiwi, Taudufu, Ondi, Fitowin, Suri, and Daisiu.

The Yakore and Muris Kecil villages also refer to themselves as Ngaya, and the Ambora, Yaugapsa, and Kamdera villages refer to themselves as Unar, both in reference to two sisters believed to be the ancestors of the Demta.
