= Muri language =

Muri may refer to the following Papuan languages:

- Mer language, spoken in the Bird's Neck, Indonesian Papua
- Guhu-Samane language, spoken in the Bird's Tail Peninsula, Papua New Guinea
