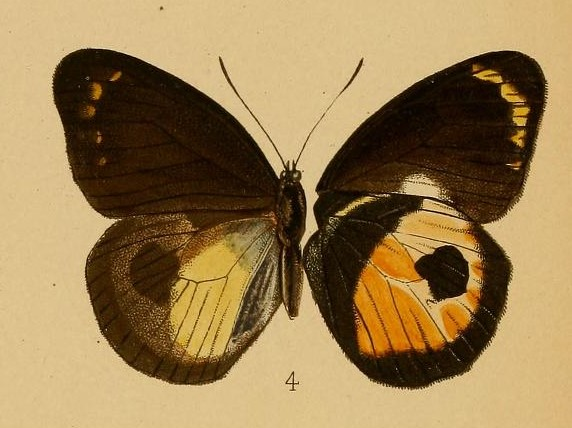

Scientific classification
- Domain: Eukaryota
- Kingdom: Animalia
- Phylum: Arthropoda
- Class: Insecta
- Order: Lepidoptera
- Family: Pieridae
- Genus: Delias
- Species: D. albertisi

Binomial name
- Delias albertisi (Oberthür, 1880)

Synonyms
- Pieris albertisi Oberthür, 1880; Delias albertisi f. africanus Kenrick, 1911

= Delias albertisi =

Species of butterfly

Delias albertisi is a species of butterfly in the family Pieridae. It was first described by Charles Oberthür in 1880 and is found in New Guinea.

The wingspan is about 50–60 mm.

== Subspecies ==
- Delias albertisi albertisi (West Irian: Arfak Mountains)
- Delias albertisi albiplaga Joicey & Talbot, 1922 (West Irian: Weyland Mountains)
- Delias albertisi discoides Talbot, 1937 (Irian Jaya: Jayapura, Cyclops Mountains)
