= Semimi language =

Language

Semimi
- Native to: Indonesia
- Region: Teluk Etna District, Kaimana Regency, West Papua
- Native speakers: (1,000 cited 1991)
- Language family: Mairasi: Semimi

Language codes
- ISO 639-3: etz
- Glottolog: semi1264

Semimi, or Etna Bay, is a Papuan language spoken in Kaimana Regency, West Papua, Indonesia.

== Bibliography ==
Word lists

- Earl, George Windsor. 1853. The Native Races of the Indian Archipelago: The Papuans. London: Hippolyte Bailliere.
- Miklucho-Maclay, Nikolaj N. 1951. Spisok nekotoryx slov dialektov Papuasov berega Papua-Koviaj na Novoj Gvinee [Some words in the dialects of the Papuans of the Papua-Kowiai Coast in New Guinea]. In: Anfert’ev (ed.), 208–211.
- Miklucho-Maclay, Nikolai von. 1876. Verzeichniss einiger Worte der Papuas der Küste Papua-Kowiay in Neu-Guinea. Tijdschrift voor Indische Taal-, Land- en Volkenkunde (TBG) 23: 372–379.
- Gabelentz, Georg von der and Adolf Bernard Meyer (eds.). 1882 Beiträge zur Kenntnis der melanesischen, mikronesischen und papuanischen sprachen. Leipzig: S. Hirzel.
- Voorhoeve, Clemens L. 1975. Languages of Irian Jaya, Checklist: Preliminary Classification, Language Maps, Wordlists. Canberra: Pacific Linguistics.
