= Nafri language =

Papuan language spoken in Indonesia

Nafri
- Native to: Indonesia
- Region: Nafri village in Abepura District, Jayapura Regency, Papua
- Native speakers: (1,630 cited 1975)
- Language family: Northwest Papuan?: Demta–Sentani; Sentani; Nafri

Language codes
- ISO 639-3: nxx
- Glottolog: nafr1241

Nafri is a Papuan language of Papua, Indonesia. It is spoken in Nafri village on southeast Yotafa Bay in Abepura District, Jayapura Regency.
