= Kuri language (Austronesian) =

Austronesian language spoken in Indonesia

Kuri
- Nabi
- Native to: Indonesia
- Region: Bomberai Peninsula
- Native speakers: (500 cited 1982)
- Language family: Austronesian: Malayo-Polynesian; Central–Eastern Malayo-Polynesian; Kei–Tanimbar; Irarutu-Nabi; Kuri

Language codes
- ISO 639-3: nbn
- Glottolog: kuri1260
- Coordinates: 2.81°S 134.10°E

Kuri, or Nabi, is a small Austronesian language of the Bomberai Peninsula of New Guinea. Lexically it is very close to Irarutu.

== Distribution ==
Locations:

- Kuri District in Teluk Bintuni Regency
- Teluk Arguni District and Arguni Bawah District in Kaimana Regency: Pigo, Maskur, Tantura, Ergara, Kaimana, Tiwara, Owa, Bayeda, Moyana, Kokoroba, Nagura, Tugarni, Mahuwa, Fidumsa, Wawarsi, Tanusa, Warami, Baru, Tiwam, Mahua, Cowa, Bungsur, Weswasa, Burugrba, Sawi, Bobwer, Waho, Warmetia, Gusi, Afuafu, Burgerba, Mandiwa, Ukiara, Tuguwawa, Taner, Suga, Bufeur, Yainsei, Idoor, and Waromi villages.
