= Emoia cyclops =

Conservation status
- Data Deficient (IUCN 3.1)

Scientific classification
- Kingdom: Animalia
- Phylum: Chordata
- Class: Reptilia
- Order: Squamata
- Family: Scincidae
- Genus: Emoia
- Species: E. cyclops

Binomial name
- Emoia cyclops W.C. Brown, 1991

Species of lizard

Emoia cyclops, also known commonly as the Cyclops emo skink and Cyclop's skink, is a species of lizard in the family Scincidae. The species is endemic to Indonesia.

== Etymology ==
The specific name, cyclops, is a reference to the type locality which is the Cyclops Mountains.

== Geographic range ==
E. cyclops is found in northern Papua Province, Indonesian New Guinea.

== Habitat ==
The preferred natural habitat of E. cyclops is forest, at altitudes of 1,100–1,200 m (3,600–3,900 ft).

== Reproduction ==
E. cyclops is oviparous.
