= Acronymolpus =

Scientific classification
- Kingdom: Animalia
- Phylum: Arthropoda
- Clade: Pancrustacea
- Class: Insecta
- Order: Coleoptera
- Suborder: Polyphaga
- Infraorder: Cucujiformia
- Family: Chrysomelidae
- Subfamily: Eumolpinae
- Tribe: Eumolpini
- Genus: Acronymolpus; Samuelson, 2015

Type species
- Acronymolpus joliveti ( = Stethotes jourdani Jolivet, Verma & Mille, 2013) Samuelson, 2015

Species
- Acronymolpus bertiae; Acronymolpus jourdani

Genus of beetles

Acronymolpus is a genus of leaf beetles in the subfamily Eumolpinae. It is endemic to New Caledonia. There are two species placed in the genus, both of which are sexually dimorphic; the females are large and reddish, and the males are small and black. A member of the tribe Eumolpini, Acronymolpus is distinguished from other members of the tribe in New Caledonia by its enlarged metacoxae (coxae of the hind legs), which occupy most of the first abdominal ventrite and nearly reach its posterior margin.

== Taxonomy ==
Acronymolpus was first proposed by Dr. G. Allan Samuelson of the Bishop Museum, who published a description of the genus in the online journal ZooKeys in 2015. The genus name is a combination of the Latin prefix acro- (meaning "pointed, first, high"), "nyma" (given as meaning "name") and the prefix "-molpus" (from Eumolpus, the type genus of the subfamily Eumolpinae), and has a masculine gender. The genus originally contained four new species, all described by the same author. These four species were later found to be the female and male forms of two previously described species placed in Stethotes. These two Stethotes species were then transferred to Acronymolpus in 2017, taking priority over the original four species placed in the genus.

== Description ==
The body is bulky and fusiform, nearly having a diamond shape in the females. The females are larger (3.0–3.3 mm), broader, more convex and reddish, while the males are smaller (2.4–2.6 mm), more slender, less convex and black. The elytra are strongly narrowed from the basal region to the preapex. The antennae are slender and elongate, reaching their apex at 1/3 or more of the length of the elytra. The pronotum is convex with the front-side area strongly descended, appearing narrowed when viewed from above. The scutellum is small and triangular, with a smooth surface. The punctures on the elytra are arranged in regular stripes, but the central rows are confused and obliterated at the basal half before being organised into straight rows at the apex. A groove is present on the pygidium.

The prosternum is subquadrate and flattened. The hypomeron is more or less smooth and lacks punctures. The metasternum is broadly and gently convex, and more or less smooth. The first abdominal ventrite is almost trisected by the enlarged metacoxae. The remaining ventrites are narrowed posteriorly, collectively forming a subtriangular outline.

In the legs, the femora are subclavate, and the tibiae are slender, being nearly equal in length to the femora. The apex of the metatibia is entire, lacking an emargination. The metacoxae are enlarged. The tarsal claws are appendiculate.

== Species ==
The genus Acronymolpus includes two species:

- Acronymolpus bertiae (Jolivet, Verma & Mille, 2007) (Synonyms: A. meteorus Samuelson, 2015; A. turbo Samuelson, 2015) – Central Chain, Massif de la Boghen
- Acronymolpus jourdani (Jolivet, Verma & Mille, 2013) (Synonyms: A. gressitti Samuelson, 2015; A. joliveti Samuelson, 2015) – Massif du Panié
