= Tricholapita =

Scientific classification
- Kingdom: Animalia
- Phylum: Arthropoda
- Clade: Pancrustacea
- Class: Insecta
- Order: Coleoptera
- Suborder: Polyphaga
- Infraorder: Cucujiformia
- Family: Chrysomelidae
- Subfamily: Eumolpinae
- Tribe: Eumolpini
- Genus: Tricholapita; Gómez-Zurita & Cardoso, 2020

Type species
- Taophila mars Samuelson, 2010

Synonyms
- Lapita Gómez-Zurita & Cardoso, 2014 (nec Bickel, 2002)

Genus of leaf beetles

Tricholapita is a genus of leaf beetles in the subfamily Eumolpinae. The genus is endemic to New Caledonia.

== Taxonomy ==
The genus was first proposed by the entomologists Jésus Gómez-Zurita and Anabela Cardoso as a subgenus of Taophila, after a morphological and molecular study of the latter in 2014. The subgenus was given the name Lapita, and included three species. A 2019 phylogenetic study of the subgenus added a further eight species to it. The subgenus Lapita was discovered to be a junior homonym of the fly genus Lapita Bickel, 2002, so it was renamed to Tricholapita in 2020. Given the many morphological differences to Taophila s. str., the group was also elevated in rank to genus. Additionally, phylogenetic evidence suggested another species, which was proposed in the same work.

== Species ==
There are 12 species currently included in the genus:

- Tricholapita aphrodita (Gómez-Zurita, 2014)
- Tricholapita atlantis (Platania & Gómez-Zurita, 2019)
- Tricholapita gaea (Gómez-Zurita, 2014)
- Tricholapita hermes (Platania & Gómez-Zurita, 2019)
- Tricholapita kronos (Platania & Gómez-Zurita, 2019)
- Tricholapita mars (Samuelson, 2010)
- Tricholapita oceanica (Platania & Gómez-Zurita, 2019)
- Tricholapita olympica (Platania & Gómez-Zurita, 2019)
- Tricholapita ouranos (Platania & Gómez-Zurita, 2019)
- Tricholapita reidi Gómez-Zurita, Platania & Cardoso, 2020
- Tricholapita riberai (Platania & Gómez-Zurita, 2019)
- Tricholapita tridentata (Platania & Gómez-Zurita, 2019)
