= Yamur Lake grunter =

Conservation status
- Data Deficient (IUCN 3.1)

Scientific classification
- Kingdom: Animalia
- Phylum: Chordata
- Class: Actinopterygii
- Order: Centrarchiformes
- Family: Terapontidae
- Genus: Variichthys
- Species: V. jamoerensis

Binomial name
- Variichthys jamoerensis (Mees, 1971)

Synonyms
- Therapon jamoerensis Mees, 1971; Varia jamoerensis (Mees, 1971)

Species of ray-finned fish

The Yamur Lake grunter or Jamur Lake grunter (Variichthys jamoerensis) is a species of freshwater ray-finned fish, a grunter in the family Terapontidae. It is endemic to Lake Yamur on West Papua in Indonesia.
