= Cazeresia montana =

Scientific classification
- Kingdom: Animalia
- Phylum: Arthropoda
- Clade: Pancrustacea
- Class: Insecta
- Order: Coleoptera
- Suborder: Polyphaga
- Infraorder: Cucujiformia
- Family: Chrysomelidae
- Genus: Cazeresia
- Species: C. montana

Binomial name
- Cazeresia montana Jolivet, Verma & Mille, 2005

Species of beetle

Cazeresia montana is a species of leaf beetle endemic to New Caledonia. It was described by Jolivet, Verma & Mille in 2005, from several individuals collected close to the summit of Mount Humboldt. However, some of those original specimens were later distinguished as a separate unique species, being named as Cazeresia imperiosa Gómez-Zurita & Cardoso, 2025.
