= Doyo Lama =

Coordinates: 2°34′8.26″S 140°27′7.24″E

Doyo Lama is a megalithic site of New Guinea. It is placed on a hill near the Lake Sentani, at the north-west; in Jayapura Regency, Papua, Indonesia. There are also petroglyphs.
