= Tanah Merah language =

Tanah Merah (Tanahmerah) may refer to either of two Papuan languages:

- Sumuri language (Trans–New Guinea)
- Tabla language (Sentani)

== See also ==
- Tanah Merah (disambiguation)
