= Variichthys =

Scientific classification
- Kingdom: Animalia
- Phylum: Chordata
- Class: Actinopterygii
- Order: Centrarchiformes
- Family: Terapontidae
- Genus: Variichthys; Allen, 1993

Type species
- Therapon jamoerensis Mees 1971

Species
- see text

Synonyms
- Varia Allen, 1991

Genus of ray-finned fishes

Variichthys is a genus of freshwater ray-finned fishes in the family Terapontidae from New Guinea and northern Australia. It was formerly known as Varia, but this name is preoccupied by a genus of moth.

== Species ==
The following species are classified within the genus Variichthys:

- Variichthys jamoerensis (Mees, 1971) (Jamur Lake grunter)
- Variichthys lacustris (Mees & Kailola, 1977) (Lake grunter)
