= Etna Bay =

- Teluk Etna (Indonesian)
- Location within Western New Guinea
- Location: Western New Guinea
- Coordinates: 3.93333°S 134.75°E
- Type: Bay
- Basin countries: Indonesia
- Max. width: 450 kilometres (280 mi)
- Max. depth: 1,627 metres (5,338 ft)

Etna Bay (Indonesian: Teluk Etna, Dutch: Etna-baai) is a bay of the Arafura Sea in eastern Kaimana Regency, situated in the southeastern corner of West Papua province, Indonesia. The port town of Kaimana is located to the west of Etna Bay. Etna Bay is geographically part of the administrative area of the Etna Bay District in Kaimana Regency.

The Etna Bay languages are spoken in the area. The bay got its name from the Etna expedition.

In 1962, during the West New Guinea dispute between Indonesia and the Netherlands, the Battle of Arafura Sea was fought offshore Etna Bay.

== See also ==
- Etna Bay languages
