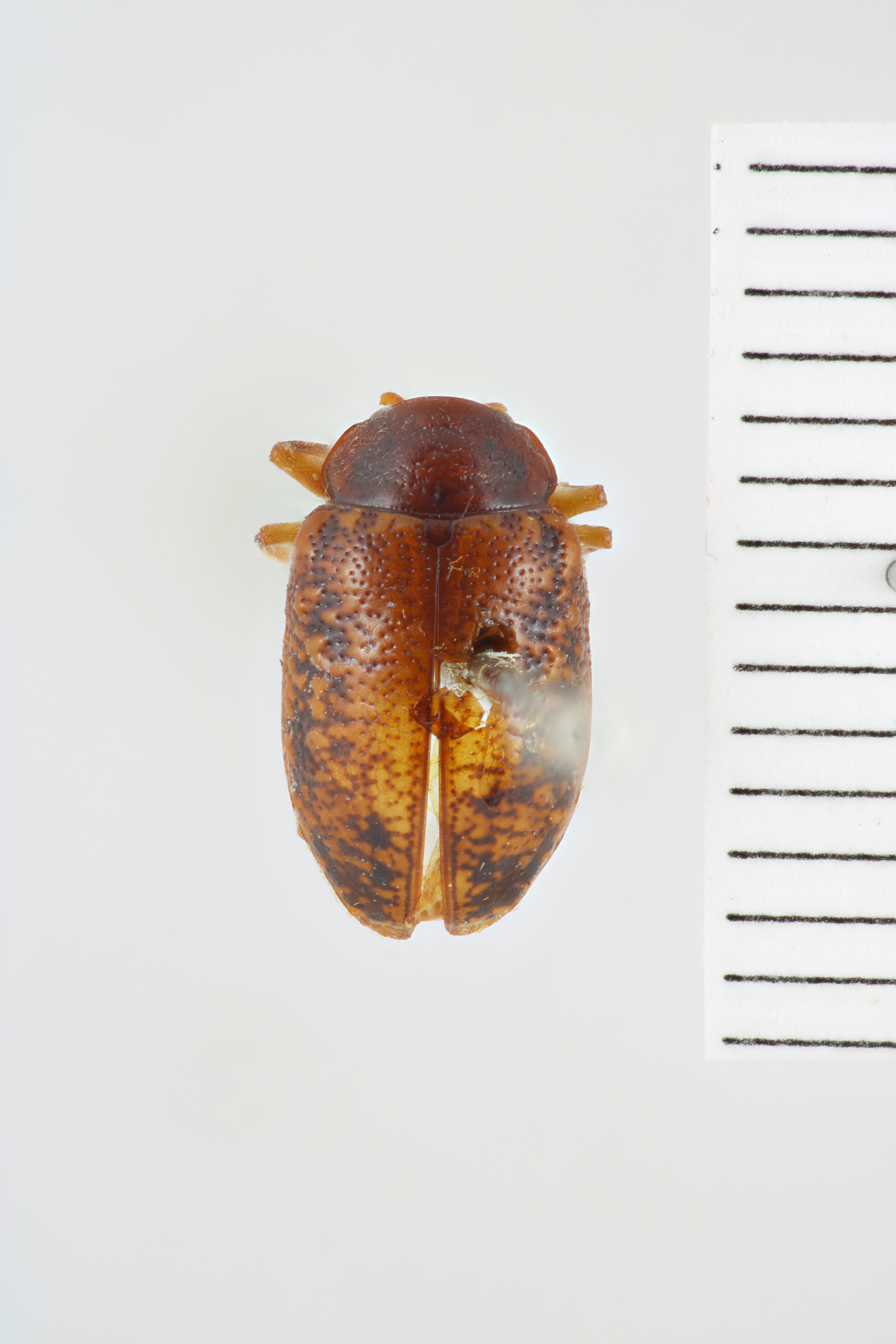
- Thasycles panieensis

Scientific classification
- Kingdom: Animalia
- Phylum: Arthropoda
- Clade: Pancrustacea
- Class: Insecta
- Order: Coleoptera
- Suborder: Polyphaga
- Infraorder: Cucujiformia
- Family: Chrysomelidae
- Subfamily: Eumolpinae
- Tribe: Eumolpini
- Genus: Thasycles; Chapuis, 1874

Type species
- Thasycles cordiformis Chapuis, 1874

= Thasycles =

Genus of leaf beetles

Thasycles is a genus of leaf beetles in the subfamily Eumolpinae. It is endemic to New Caledonia. For a long time it was treated as a synonym of Dematochroma, until it was reinstated as a valid genus in 2022.

== Species ==
Eleven species are included in the genus:

- Thasycles castaneus Gómez-Zurita, 2022
- Thasycles compactus Gómez-Zurita, 2022
- Thasycles cordiformis Chapuis, 1874
- Thasycles fuscus (Jolivet, Verma & Mille, 2007)
- Thasycles grandis Gómez-Zurita, 2022
- Thasycles laboulbenei (Montrouzier, 1861)
- Thasycles magnus Gómez-Zurita, 2022
- Thasycles panieensis (Jolivet, Verma & Mille, 2007)
- Thasycles puncticollis Gómez-Zurita, 2022
- Thasycles tenuis Gómez-Zurita, 2022
- Thasycles variegatus Gómez-Zurita, 2022
