= Lake grunter =

Conservation status
- Vulnerable (IUCN 3.1)

Scientific classification
- Kingdom: Animalia
- Phylum: Chordata
- Class: Actinopterygii
- Order: Centrarchiformes
- Family: Terapontidae
- Genus: Variichthys
- Species: V. lacustris

Binomial name
- Variichthys lacustris (Mees & Kailola, 1977)

Synonyms
- Therapon lacustris Mees & Kailola, 1977; Varia lacustris (Mees & Kailola, 1977)

Species of ray-finned fish

The lake grunter (Variichthys lacustris) is a species of freshwater ray-finned fish, a grunter in the family Terapontidae. It is found in southern New Guinea and in northern Queensland in Australia. It prefers to live in still water, especially in heavily vegetated swamps, flood lagoons and small lakes.
