= Demta–Sentani languages =

Language family

Demta–Sentani
- Demta – Lake Sentani
- Geographic distribution: Lake Sentani region, Papua
- Linguistic classification: Northwest Papuan? East Bird's Head – Sentani?: Demta–Sentani
- Subdivisions: Demta; Sentani

Language codes
- ISO 639-3: –
- Glottolog: sent1261

The Demta–Sentani languages form a language family of coastal Indonesian Papua near the Papua New Guinea border.

== Languages ==
- Demta–Sentani
  - Demta
  - Sentani proper
    - Sentani
    - Nafri
    - Tabla (Tanah Merah)

The term 'Sentani' is ambiguous. It may be used in a wider sense, including Demta, in a narrow sense (Sentani proper) excluding Demta – either as an unrelated language family or as a branch of Demta–Sentani – or for the Sentani language itself. Usher distinguishes these three scopes as 'Demta – Sentani Lake', 'Sentani Lake' and 'Sentani'.

== Classification ==
Demta–Sentani was a branch of Stephen Wurm's proposal for Trans–New Guinea. The languages have lexical similarities with the Asmat–Kamoro languages, though later linguists have not accepted the resemblances as indicative of a genealogical relationship. Pawley and Hammarström (2018) list the following resemblances between the Sentani languages and proto-Trans-New Guinea, though they classify Sentani as a separate language family rather than as part of Trans-New Guinea.

- C. Sentani an- ‘eat’ < *na-
- C. Sentani mikæ ‘vomit’ (n.) < *mVkV[C]
- C. Sentani mu ‘penis’ < *mo
- W. Sentani, Tabla oto ‘leg’ < *k(a,o)ndok
- Tabla miŋ, C. Sentani mi ‘louse’ < *iman
- C. Sentani mi- ‘come’ < *me-

Ross (2005) does not believe these demonstrate a genealogical relationship, and proposes instead that the Demta–Sentani languages are related to the East Bird's Head languages, in a tentative East Bird's Head – Sentani family. Foley (2018) classifies them as an independent language family. Usher (2020) tentatively includes them in a proposed Northwest Papuan family, though as of 2020 it's not clear whether the resemblances are due to inheritance or borrowing.

The connection between Demta and the Sentani languages is not supported by Søren Wichmann (2013)'s automated comparison.

== Pronouns ==
The pronouns Ross reconstructs for proto-family are:

I	*də	exclusive we	*me
I	*də	inclusive we	*e
thou	*wa	you	?
s/he	*nə	they	?

Comparative pronouns in Sentani languages:

pronoun	Sentani	Tabla	Nafri	Sowari
1s	də(yæ)	də	te(ye)	mini
2s	wə(yæ)	wə	we(ye)	we
3s	nə(yæ)	nə	ne(ye)	ngane
1p.excl	me(yæ)	e	me	ngama
1p.incl	e(yæ)			
2p	mə(yæ)	we	mai	me
3p	nə(yæ)	nə	ne(ye)	kumbi

== Vocabulary comparison ==
The following basic vocabulary words are from McElhanon & Voorhoeve (1970) (for Sentani) and Voorhoeve (1975), as cited in the Trans-New Guinea database.

The words cited constitute translation equivalents, whether they are cognate (e.g. possibly ey, au, aye for “bird”) or not (e.g. tuniyiŋgan, yebu, faləm for “head”).

gloss	Sowari	Nafri	Sentani
head	tuniyiŋgan	yebu	faləm
hair	pioupiə	mwa	uma
eye	kariŋgewa	iro	i joko
nose			face
tooth	itini	cə	itəha
leg	nəmbia	oto	oro
louse	ami		mi
dog	aweŋgen	yoku	yoku
pig	nifie	obo	obo
bird	ey	au	aye
egg	kuku	to	do
blood	owar	sa	oki
bone	ari	iro	po
skin	yow yim	wa	wa
breast			nimə
tree	ya-yeŋgan	ono	no
man	watuga	to	do
sun	omar	sipo	hu
water	yarim		bu
fire	payn	i	i
stone	kara	tuka	duka
name	aror	to	do
eat	emaŋo	anforu	anəi-ko
one	upu	mbe	əmbai
two	pugwai	be	be

== See also ==
- Papuan languages
- Districts of Papua for a list of districts and villages with respective languages
