= Mairasi languages =

Family of Papuan languages

Mairasi
- Etna Bay
- Geographic distribution: Etna Bay, Kaimana Regency, West Papua
- Linguistic classification: One of the world's primary language families

Language codes
- Glottolog: mair1253
- Distribution of the Mairasi languages

The Mairasi languages, also known as Etna Bay, are a small independent family of Papuan languages in the classifications of Malcolm Ross and Timothy Usher, that had been part of Stephen Wurm's Trans–New Guinea proposal. They are named after Etna Bay, located in the southeastern corner of West Papua province, in Indonesia.

== Languages ==
The Mairasi languages are clearly related to each other.

- Mairasi family: Semimi, Mer, Mairasi, Northeastern Mairasi

== Classification ==
Mairasi cannot be linked to other families by its pronouns. However, Voorhoeve (1975) links it to the Sumeri (Tanah Merah) language, either a language isolate or an independent branch of the Trans–New Guinea family.

Pawley and Hammarström (2018) do not consider there to be sufficient evidence for the Mairasi languages to be classified as part of Trans-New Guinea, though they do note the following lexical resemblance between Mairasi, Semimi, and proto-Trans-New Guinea.

Mairasi ooro and Semimi okoranda ‘leg’ < proto-Trans-New Guinea *k(a,o)nd(a,o)C ‘leg’

=== Phonemes ===
Usher (2020) reconstructs the consonant inventory as follows:

*m	*n		
*ɸ	*t	*s	*k
*mb	*nd	*ns	*ŋg
*w	*ɾ	*j	

Vowels are *a *e *i *o *u. *ns is uncommon.

=== Pronouns ===
Usher (2020) reconstructs the free and possessive pronouns as:

	sg	pl
1excl	*omo, *o-	*eme, *e-
1incl	*omo, *o-	*e-tumakia, *e-
2	*neme, *ne-	*keme, *ke-
3	*nani, *na-	?

=== Basic vocabulary ===
Some lexical reconstructions by Usher (2020) are:

gloss	Proto-Etna Bay
hair/feather	*-suɾu
ear	*ɸiɾa
eye	*mbiatu
nose	*-mbi
tooth	*-ɾasi
tongue	*-saɸia
foot/leg	*-koɾa
blood	*iseɾe
bone	*tuɾa
skin/bark	*(na)-kia
breast	*joku
louse	*kumai
dog	*ansi
pig	*[ɸ]embe
bird	*sai
egg	*ete
man/male	*koɸo
woman	*eɸei
sun	*tende
moon	*aŋgane
water	*ɸat[e]
fire	*iɸoɾo
stone	*jaɸutu
path	*kae
name	*u[w]ata
one	*tana-(kau)
two	*amoi

== Lexical comparisons ==
Below is a basic vocabulary table of Mairasi languages (Mairasi, Mer, Semimi) with potential cognate matches, from Peckham (1991a,b), quoted in Foley (2018):

Mairasi family basic vocabulary
gloss	Mairasi	Mer	Semimi
‘bird’	sai	sai	sai
‘blood’	isere	isere	monad
‘bone’	natura	singgu	natura
‘breast’	jogu	jogu	jogu
‘ear’	navir anda	nevira	ot navira (Note: The exact phonetic values of <v> and <f> in Mer and Semimi are unknown.)
‘eat’	neneman	namba	neneme
‘egg’	eːte	ede	anggu ete
‘eye’	nambutu	nembiatu	ombiatu
‘fire’	ivore	ivoro	iforo
‘give’	tomnaijan	nombonaiyomo	tomonai
‘ground’	wasasai	wasase	makoro
‘hair’	nasuru	nasuru	nasuru
‘hear’	ivjeme	iveme	iveme
‘I’	ʔomo	omo	omo
‘leg’	naʔor	nakora	okor anda
‘louse’	ʔumai	kumai	kumai
‘man’	tatʔovo	neum tato	tatokovo
‘moon’	unsir	anggane	anggane
‘name’	nggwata	wata	newata
‘one’	tanggau	nawaze	tanakau
‘path, road’	ʔae	kae	kai
‘see’	natom	daviomo	nondome
‘stone’	javutu	wavo	javutu
‘sun’	tende	ungguru	tende
‘tongue’	nasavia	nesavi	osavi
‘tooth’	narasi	nerasi	orasi
‘tree’	ʔiu	u	ʔu
‘two’	amoi	amoi	amoi
‘water’	fata	kai	fate
‘we’	eːme	edumaga	ʔeme
‘woman’	evei	waini	efei
‘you (sg)’	ʔeme	kene	keme

Usher's protoforms of the 20 most stable items in the Swadesh list include the following.

Proto-Mairasi	gloss
*kumai	louse
*amoi	two
*ɸat[e]	water
*-ɸiɾa	ear
?	die
*o-mo	I
?	liver
*-mbiatu	eye
*-ɸaka	hand/arm
*iɸi-	hear
?	tree
*uɾatu	fish
*u[w]ata	name
*jaɸutu	stone
*-ɾasi	tooth
*joku	breast
*ne-me	you
*kae	path
*-tuɾa	bone
*-saɸia	tongue

== See also ==
- Papuan languages
