= Tabla language =

Language of Papua, Indonesia

Tabla
- Tanah Merah
- Native to: Indonesia
- Region: Jayapura Regency, Papua
- Native speakers: (3,800 cited 1990)
- Language family: Northwest Papuan?: Demta–Sentani; Sentani; Tabla

Language codes
- ISO 639-3: tnm
- Glottolog: tabl1243

Tabla (one of two Papuan languages also known as Tanah Merah) is spoken by the Tabla people on the coast of Tanahmerah Bay, close to Jayapura, in northern Papua (Indonesia). It is spoken in Bukia, Depapre, and Wari towns, and 13 villages on north coast. Dialects are Yokari, Tepera, and Yewena-Yongsu.

== Phonology ==
Consonants
		Labial	Alveolar	Velar
Nasal		m	n	
Stop	voiceless	p	t	k
Stop	voiced	b	d	
Fricative			s	
Approximant		w	j	

Vowels
	Front	Central	Back
Close	i		u
Mid	e	ə	o
Back		a	
