= Kowiai language =

Austronesian language of New Guinea

Kowiai
- South Bomberai
- Native to: Indonesia
- Region: Kaimana Regency
- Native speakers: (600 cited 2000)
- Language family: Austronesian: Malayo-Polynesian; Seram-Tanimbar-Bomberai; Eastern Islands; Kowiai

Language codes
- ISO 639-3: kwh
- Glottolog: kowi1239
- ELP: Kowiai

Kowiai (Kuiwai) is an Austronesian language of the Bomberai Peninsula in New Guinea. According to the Atlas of Languages of Intercultural Communication in the Pacific and Asia, Kowiai is spoken in the coastal regions between Arguni and Etna bay.

== Distribution ==
Locations within Kaimana Regency:

- Kaimana District: Namatota and Bicari villages
- Buruwai District: Pulau Adi and Nusa Ulang villages
- Teluk Etna District: Kayu Merah village
- Niraran District: Trikora village
- Coa District: Sowa village
- Kroy District
- Kaimana City
