= Sentani, Jayapura =

Sentani
- District
- Location in Papua (province) and Indonesia Sentani (Indonesia)
- Coordinates: 2.563642°S 140.514640°E
- Country: Indonesia
- Province: Papua
- Capital: Sentani Kota

Government
  - Kepala Distrik: Eroll Yohanis Daisiu, SE

Area
  - Total: 79.80 km^{2} (30.81 sq mi)

Population (mid 2024 estimate)
  - Total: 84,602
  - Density: 1,060/km^{2} (2,746/sq mi)
- Time zone: UTC+9 (Indonesia Eastern Time)
- Area code: (+62) 967

Sentani is an administrative district (distrik) and also a town (kelurahan) which serves as the capital of Jayapura Regency, in Papua (province), Indonesia. Sentani District has an area of around 79.80 km^{2} with a total population in mid 2023 of around 84,602 people (comprising 43,815 males and 40,787 females), and a population density of around 1,060/km^{2}.

Meanwhile, the town (kelurahan) of Sentani Kota, located some 40 km west of Jayapura City and the site of Sentani International Airport, had 26,518 inhabitants in mid 2024, while adjoining Hinekombe kelurahan to the west (containing the actual administrative centre of the district, and forming part of the same urban area) had another 26,871 inhabitants in mid 2024, and adjoining Dobonsolo kelurahan to the south (also part of the same built-up area) had another 15,656 inhabitants in mid 2024. The three kelurahan together thus cover 43.32 km^{2} with 69,035 inhabitants in mid 2024.

In addition to these three towns (kelurahan), the district contains 7 rural villages (desa), listed below with their populations in mid 2024. Sereh village lies to the north of the town, on the southern slopes of the Cyclops Mountains, while the other desa are all to the town's south, mostly bordering the shores of Lake Sentani. All ten communities share the postcode of 99352.

| Kode Wilayah | Name of desa | Area in km^{2} | Population mid 2024 estimate |
|---|---|---|---|
| 91.03.01.1001 | Sentani Kota | 20.56 | 26,518 |
| 91.03.01.1002 | Dobonsolo | 3.27 | 15,656 |
| 91.03.01.1003 | Hinekombe | 19.49 | 26,871 |
| 91.03.01.2004 | Sereh | 11.50 | 5,427 |
| 91.03.01.2005 | Yobeh | 3.52 | 2,878 |
| 91.03.01.2006 | Ifale (Ajau) | 4.43 | 1,824 |
| 91.03.01.2007 | Yoboy/Kehusa/Kehiran | 3.84 | 1,436 |
| 91.03.01.2010 | Ifar Besar | 5.52 | 1,246 |
| 91.03.01.2011 | Hobong | 4.40 | 991 |
| 91.03.01.2017 | Yahim | 3.27 | 1,755 |
| 91.03.01 | Totals | 79.80 | 84,602 |

== Geography ==
The boundaries of the Sentani District are as follows:

| North | Cyclops Mountains - Ravenirara District and Depapre District |
| South | Ebumfau District |
| West | Waibu District, then West Sentani District beyond |
| East | East Sentani District |

In 2020, Sentani District has 3 towns (kelurahan) and 7 rural villages (desa), 60 RW and 217 RT, with Sentani Kota having the highest RT and RW at 12 RW and 53 RT.

== Demography ==
=== Religion ===
According to the Ministry of Home Affairs data, the majority of religion adherents at 58.16% are Protestants, 6.05% are Catholics, 35.44% are Muslims, 0.18% are Buddhists, and 0.17% are Hindus. There are 66 Protestant churches, 22 Mosques, 3 catholic churches, and 1 Pura.<ref name="SENTANI"/
