= Yamor =

District in West Papua, Indonesia

- District
- Location in Western New Guinea
- Coordinates: 3.693894°S 134.910124°E
- Country: Indonesia
- Province: West Papua
- Regency: Kaimana

Area
  - Total: 3,805 km^{2} (1,469 sq mi)

Population (2023)
  - Total: 1.553
  - Density: 0.0004081/km^{2} (0.001057/sq mi)
- Time zone: UTC+9 (WIT)
- Postal Code: 98122

Yamor is an administrative district in Kaimana Regency, West Papua, Indonesia.
