= Demta language =

Papuan language

Demta
- Sowari
- Native to: Indonesia
- Region: Demta District, Jayapura Regency, Papua
- Native speakers: (1,300 cited 2000)
- Language family: Northwest Papuan?: Demta–Sentani; Demta

Language codes
- ISO 639-3: dmy
- Glottolog: demt1241

Demta, also known as Sowari and Muris, is a Papuan language spoken by the Demta people on the north coast of Papua, Indonesia. It is spoken in Ambora, Muris Besar, Muris Kecil, and Yougafsa villages, all located in Demta District.
