= Sentani people =

- Portrait of a group of Sentani in 1903

Total population
- >30,000

Regions with significant populations
- Lake Sentani

Languages
- Sentani, Papuan Malay, and Indonesian

Religion
- Christianity (majority)

The Sentani people are an indigenous Papuan ethnic group native to the Jayapura Regency of Papua. They mainly live near Lake Sentani and other parts of Jayapura. Their population is around 30,000 people. Their main language is the Sentani language with East, West, and Central dialects.

Kombo, a Sentani stilt house for male initiation in Asei, 1903

== Culture ==
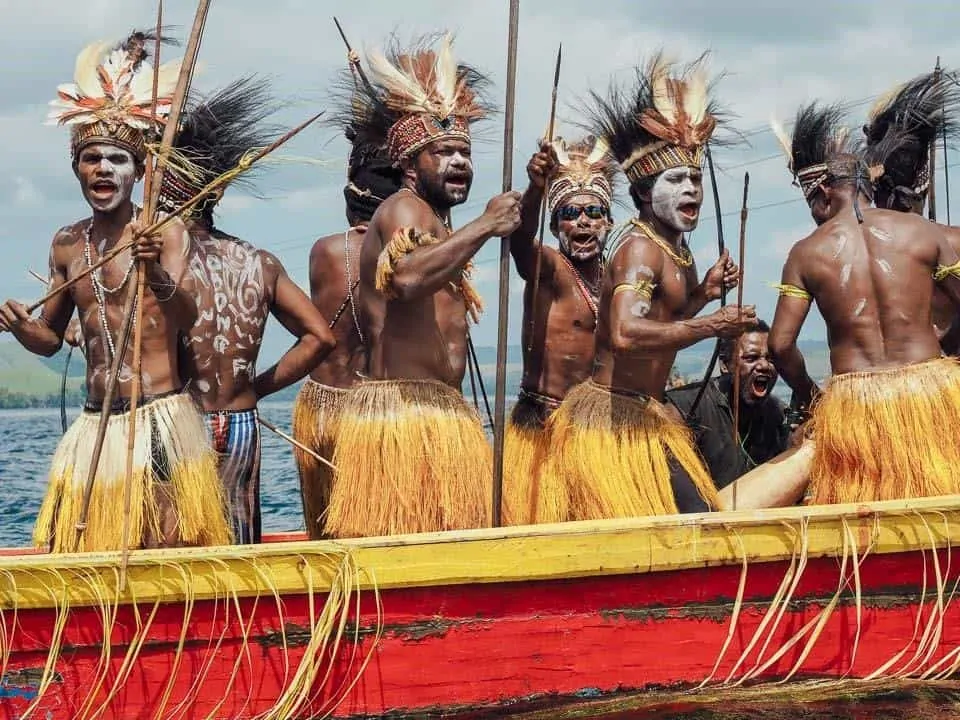

=== Traditional houses ===
The Sentani people have three types of traditional houses: Kombo (male initiation house, pyramid-shaped), Obee (traditional hall, rectangular with a gable roof), and Khogo (residence, rectangular with a roof element covered on the sides). The shape of the Kombo varies, especially in different villages.

=== Pottery and Tattoos ===
The use of pottery is not found in other areas of Papua except on the north coast, especially with the Sentani and Kurudu tribes. Tattoos are an example of Austronesian culture used by the Sentani, usually applied on the face, hands, and feet.

== Economy ==
Many of the Sentani people heavily rely on a combination of coastal fishing and sago harvesting. This has been sustainable for centuries but local reports may suggest that catch yields have diminished in recent years.
