= Mairasi language =

Papuan language spoken in Indonesia

Mairasi
- Native to: West Papua, Indonesia
- Region: Bomberai Peninsula
- Native speakers: (3,300 cited 1996)
- Language family: Mairasi: Mairasi

Language codes
- ISO 639-3: zrs
- Glottolog: nucl1594

Mairasi (a.k.a. Faranyao and Kaniran) is a Papuan language of the Bomberai Peninsula of West Papua, Indonesia.

The Northeastern dialect may be a distinct language.

== Distribution ==
Locations:

- Kaimana Regency
  - Interior villages: Umbran, Jamna Fata, Matna, Tarwata, Sara, Kasira, Orai, Wangatnau, Faranyau, and Sarifan
  - Coastal villages: Sisir, Foroma Jaya, Warasi, Lobo, Lomira, Morona, Nanggwaromi, Omay (May may), and Warika
- Teluk Wondama Regency
  - Naikere District villages: Sararti, Oya, Yabore, Wosimo, Undurara, and Inyora

== Phonology ==
Consonants
		Bilabial	Alveolar	Post- alveolar	Velar	Glottal
Nasal		m	n			
Plosive	voiceless		t			ʔ
Plosive	voiced	b	d	dʒ	ɡ	
Fricative	voiceless	ɸ	s			
Fricative	voiced	β				
Liquid			r			
Semivowel		w				

Vowels
	Front	Back
Close	i	u
Mid	e	o
Back	a	

== Pronouns ==
Mairasi possessor prefixes are:

	sg	pl
1	o-	ee-
2	ne-	e-
3	na-	ne-

== Morphology ==
=== Case markers ===
Noun phrase case markers in Mairasi:

- instrumental suffix -t
- locative postposition ar
- allative postposition ev(i)

Some examples:

ovuru-t
machete-INSTR
‘with a machete’

weso ar
house LOC
‘in the house’

mundu evi
village ALL
‘to the village’

=== Possessors ===
Mairasi possessor prefixes:

	sg	pl
1	o-	ee-
2	ne-	e-
3	na-	ne-

Examples of inalienable possessors:

ee-rovo
1PL.POSS-hand
‘our hands’

na-iambi
3SG.POSS-skin
‘his skin’

=== Directionals ===
Mairasi has two directional suffixes, which are only used with movement verbs.

- -aʔi ‘up, inland’
- -ari ‘down, seaward’

Examples of directional suffixes in use:

o-is-aʔi
1SG.SBJ-stand-up
‘I stand up’

o-fon-ari
1SG.SBJ-sit-down
‘I sit down’

=== Animacy ===
Animacy is marked by the adjective modifier n-, as exemplified by the contrast in the following two noun phrases.

fariri Ø-avwer
word INAN-big
‘a big word’

fariri n-avwer
word ANIM-big
‘a long-winded person’

Vowel changes can modify the number of animate nouns:

uratu n-avwer
fish ANIM-big.SG
‘a big fish’

uratu n-evwer
fish ANIM-big.PL
‘big fishes’
