= Mer language =

Language in Papua

Mer
- Native to: Indonesia
- Region: West Papua
- Native speakers: (85 cited 2000)
- Language family: Mairasi: Mer

Language codes
- ISO 639-3: mnu
- Glottolog: merr1239
- ELP: Mer (Indonesia)

Mer (also called Muri, Miere) is a Papuan language spoken in West Papua province of Indonesia.

== Groups ==
There are two groups of Miere speakers:

- Gunung ("Mountain") or Kakak ("elder") group, in Yabore village, Naikere District
- Pantai ("Beach") or Adik ("younger") group, in Senderewoi village, Rasiey District
