= Lapita (fly) =

Scientific classification
- Kingdom: Animalia
- Phylum: Arthropoda
- Class: Insecta
- Order: Diptera
- Family: Dolichopodidae
- Subfamily: Sciapodinae
- Tribe: Chrysosomatini
- Genus: Lapita; Bickel, 2002

Type species
- Psilopodius noumeanus Bigot, 1890

Genus of flies

Lapita is a genus of flies in the family Dolichopodidae. It is known from New Caledonia, Fiji and Vanuatu.

== Species ==
- Lapita acanthotarsus Bickel, 2002
- Lapita adusta Bickel, 2016
- Lapita batiqere Bickel, 2016
- Lapita bicolor Bickel, 2016
- Lapita boucheti Bickel, 2002
- Lapita bouloupari Bickel, 2002
- Lapita caerula Bickel, 2002
- Lapita chazeaui Bickel, 2002
- Lapita coloisuva Bickel, 2016
- Lapita couleensis Bickel, 2002
- Lapita cudo Bickel, 2002
- Lapita delaco Bickel, 2016
- Lapita denticauda Bickel, 2016
- Lapita dogny Bickel, 2002
- Lapita dugdalei Bickel, 2002
- Lapita dumbea Bickel, 2002
- Lapita duo Bickel, 2002
- Lapita expirata Bickel, 2002
- Lapita greenwoodi (Bezzi, 1928)
- Lapita inhisa Bickel, 2002
- Lapita irwini Bickel, 2002
- Lapita kanakorum Bickel, 2002
- Lapita kraussi Bickel, 2002
- Lapita kuitarua Bickel, 2016
- Lapita laniensis Bickel, 2002
- Lapita maafusalatu Bickel, 2016
- Lapita macuata Bickel, 2016
- Lapita morleyi Bickel, 2016
- Lapita mou Bickel, 2002
- Lapita nishidai Bickel, 2002
- Lapita noumeana (Bigot, 1890)
- Lapita orstomorum Bickel, 2002
- Lapita paradoxa Bickel, 2016
- Lapita ponerihouen Bickel, 2002
- Lapita pouebo Bickel, 2002
- Lapita raveni Bickel, 2002
- Lapita rembai Bickel, 2002
- Lapita rivularis Bickel, 2002
- Lapita sanma Bickel, 2016
- Lapita sarnati Bickel, 2016
- Lapita savura Bickel, 2016
- Lapita schlingeri Bickel, 2002
- Lapita sedlacekorum Bickel, 2002
- Lapita semita Bickel, 2002
- Lapita spilota Bickel, 2002
- Lapita sylvatica Bickel, 2002
- Lapita tavuki Bickel, 2016
- Lapita ternata Bickel, 2002
- Lapita tillierorum Bickel, 2002
- Lapita timocii Bickel, 2016
- Lapita tuimerekei Bickel, 2016
- Lapita vakalevu Bickel, 2016
- Lapita vatudiri Bickel, 2016
- Lapita veilaselase Bickel, 2016
- Lapita yahoue Bickel, 2002
- Lapita yate Bickel, 2002
