= Irarutu language =

Austronesian language spoken in Indonesia

Irarutu
- Irahutu
- Kasira
- Native to: Indonesia
- Region: Bomberai Peninsula, in Teluk Bintuni Regency
- Native speakers: (4,000 cited 1987)
- Language family: Austronesian: Malayo-Polynesian; Central–Eastern Malayo-Polynesian; Kei–Tanimbar; Irarutu–Nabi; Irarutu

Language codes
- ISO 639-3: irh
- Glottolog: irar1238
- Location within Western New Guinea Location within Indonesia Location within Southeast Asia
- Coordinates: 2.94°S 133.59°E

Irarutu, Irahutu, or Kasira is an Austronesian language of most of the interior of the Bomberai Peninsula of north-western New Guinea in Teluk Bintuni Regency. The name Irarutu comes from the language itself, where ira conjoins with ru to create 'their voice'. When put together with tu, which on its own means 'true', the meaning of the name becomes 'Their true voice' or 'The people's true language'.

Kuri is very close lexically, but has not been formally classified. Other than this, Irarutu is quite divergent compared to the South Halmahera–West New Guinea languages, and may not be part of it. Previously, Irarutu was considered to belong to the South Halmahera subgroup of Austronesian languages, but more recently, Grimes and Edwards place Irarutu within the Kei-Tanimbar languages.

There are seven variations found within the language: Nabi, Babo, Kasuri, Fruata, South-Arguni, East-Arguni, North-Arguni.

== Distribution ==
Irarutu is spoken on the Bomberai Peninsula of Indonesia. Specifically, it is spoken in the following locations:

- Kaimana Regency
  - Arguni District: Minggir, Aru, Kafuryai, Warmenu, Egarwara, Warua, Tugunawa, Rafa, Fiduma, Rauna, Sumun, Wanggita, Ukiara, Warwarsi, Bovuer, Mahua, Jawera, Rofada, Waromi, Tanusan, Urisa, Mandiwa, Werafuta, Nagura, and Seraran villages
- Teluk Bintuni Regency
  - Babo District: Irarutu 3, Nusei, Kasira, Amutu, Modan, and Kanaisi villages
  - Aroba District: Wame village
  - Farfurwar District

== Phonology ==
=== Consonants ===
Tryon (1995) gives the following consonants:

Irarutu consonants
		Labial	Dental/ Alveolar	Palatal	Velar	Glottal
Nasals		m	n			
Stops	voiceless	p	t	c	k	
Stops	voiced	b	d	ɟ	g	
Fricatives		f	s			h
Flaps			ɾ			
Semivowels		w		j		

/p, t, c, k, b, d, ɟ, g/, are all stops with /p, t, c, k/ being voiceless and /b, d, ɟ, g/ being voiced. All stop consonants can be placed in any position (beginning, middle, or end) with the exception of /c/ which cannot be placed in the ending position. Voiced stops /b, d, ɟ, g/ are mainly heard as prenasalized [ᵐb, ⁿd, ᶮɟ, ᵑɡ] in the Fruata dialect.

/f, s, h/ are all voiceless fricatives. /f/ is found in all three positions and is sometimes pronounced as a voiced [v] by Native Irarutu speakers, and is mainly heard as a bilabial fricative [ɸ] in the East Arguni dialect. /s/ is also found in all three positions but is never voiced. /h/ may be a recent addition to the language. /h/ is only found in initial and middle positions.

/m, n/ are both voiced nasals. Both consonants are found in all three positions.

/ɾ/ is found in most Irarutu dialects, but is sometimes replaced by [l].

=== Vowels ===
Tryon (1995) gives the following vowels:

Irarutu vowels
	Front		Central	Back
High	i			u
High	ɪ	ʏ		
Mid	e ~ ɛ		(ə)	o ~ ɔ
Low			a	

Seven vowels are found in Irarutu, /a, e, ɪ, i, ʏ, o, u/. All seven vowels can be used in monophthong form but diphthongs are restricted to only a few combinations.

== Grammar ==
Irarutu follows the subject–verb–object (SVO) format in word order. Adjectives such as big or a numbered value come after the noun, but for lineage-related matters the initial ancestor comes before the descendant.

=== Nouns ===
Nouns are words that can be placed in the subject or object portions of a sentence and can be modified for possessive relations. There are three functions of noun phrases: semantic function, pragmatic function, and grammatical function. In Irarutu, the grammatical function for nouns and pronouns do not differ for unique situations.

==== Possessive noun phrase ====
For possessive noun phrase there are usually no prefixes, suffixes, or any other alterations made to the noun of interest. The only cases where changes to the word are made are for body parts, names, and one's child.

=== Verbs ===
Both transitive and intransitive verbs are found in the Irarutu language. These verbs are conjoined with prefixed marks to show who is creating/causing the action. Up to three unique individuals can be indicated using these marks. Sounds within the verb can change if the verb stem begins with t, ɪ, b, m, or s.

==== Verb function ====
There are three different types of prefixes relating the person who is creating the action. a- refers to first person, m- for second and n- for third. a- is used for 1st person cases but holds many rules along with it. m- is seen in almost all cases for a second-person sentence and is sometimes accompanied by an inflection. n- is present with a verb root in third-person and also tends to use inflection in the prefix.

=== Adjectives ===
Adjectives can be used to alter nouns or clauses and in most cases come after the statement altered. In Irarutu there is also a subclass of adjectives that differentiate the level of magnitude in which the adjective affects the subject or object. There are both clause-level and phrase-level adjectives, each of which affects the topic at hand differently. Nouns with multiple adjectives are indeed possible, but a bit uncommon. Adverbs exist but are often hard to point out in Irarutu sentence structure. Sometimes an entire phrase will be used to modify a verb or adjective. To make the meaning of a sentence clear, specific verbs, which can only be modified by certain adverbs, are used to show what part of the sentence is modifying what. The sequence and placement of the adverb also helps identify which part of the claim it is modifying.

== Bibliography ==
- Jackson, Jason Alexander Johann (2014). A Grammar of Irarutu, A language of West Papua, Indonesia, With Historical Analysis (Ph.D. thesis). University of Hawaii at Manoa. hdl:10125/100426.
- Voorhoeve, Clemens L. (1989), "Notes on Irarutu (an Austronesian language spoken in the centre of the Bomberai Peninsula, Southwest Irian Jaya)" (PDF), IRIAN, 17: 107–119, archived from the original (PDF) on 2006-08-18
