= Cazeresia =

Scientific classification
- Kingdom: Animalia
- Phylum: Arthropoda
- Clade: Pancrustacea
- Class: Insecta
- Order: Coleoptera
- Suborder: Polyphaga
- Infraorder: Cucujiformia
- Family: Chrysomelidae
- Subfamily: Eumolpinae
- Tribe: Eumolpini
- Genus: Cazeresia; Jolivet, Verma & Mille, 2005

Type species
- Cazeresia montana Jolivet, Verma & Mille, 2005

Genus of leaf beetles from New Caledonia

Cazeresia is a genus of leaf beetles in the subfamily Eumolpinae that is endemic to New Caledonia. After recent revision, it now contains 25 species, many only recently described. It previously contained only one species, Cazeresia montana, found at 1,450 m and above on Mount Humboldt in the South Province of New Caledonia. Adults of C. montana were found on Dracophyllum involucratum, a species of plant in the family Epacridaceae. According to Jolivet et al. (2005), most probably the larvae feed on the roots of this plant.

== Etymology ==
The genus is named after Sylvie Cazères, an assistant to the Pocquereux entomological group from the Institut Agronomique néo-Calédonien. Sylvie Cazères collected specimens of C. montana and other species of leaf beetles.

== Species ==
- Cazeresia australis Gómez-Zurita & Cardoso, 2025 – New Caledonia
- Cazeresia clipeata Gómez-Zurita & Cardoso, 2025 – New Caledonia
- Cazeresia corrugata Gómez-Zurita & Cardoso, 2025 – New Caledonia
- Cazeresia globosa Gómez-Zurita & Cardoso, 2025 – New Caledonia
- Cazeresia gracilis Gómez-Zurita & Cardoso, 2025 – New Caledonia
- Cazeresia holosericea Gómez-Zurita & Cardoso, 2025 – New Caledonia
- Cazeresia humboldtiana (Heller, 1916) – New Caledonia
- Cazeresia imperiosa Gómez-Zurita & Cardoso, 2025 – New Caledonia
- Cazeresia impressicornis Gómez-Zurita & Cardoso, 2025 – New Caledonia
- Cazeresia kanalensis (Perroud, 1864) – New Caledonia
- Cazeresia laevigata Gómez-Zurita & Cardoso, 2025 – New Caledonia
- Cazeresia laticollis Gómez-Zurita & Cardoso, 2025 – New Caledonia
- Cazeresia maquis Gómez-Zurita & Cardoso, 2025 – New Caledonia
- Cazeresia montana Jolivet, Verma & Mille, 2005 – New Caledonia
- Cazeresia ovata Gómez-Zurita & Cardoso, 2025 – New Caledonia
- Cazeresia parentalis Gómez-Zurita & Cardoso, 2025 – New Caledonia
- Cazeresia petitpierrei Gómez-Zurita & Cardoso, 2025 – New Caledonia
- Cazeresia robusta Gómez-Zurita & Cardoso, 2025 – New Caledonia
- Cazeresia spadicea Gómez-Zurita & Cardoso, 2025 – New Caledonia
- Cazeresia striata (Jolivet, Verma & Mille, 2007) – New Caledonia
- Cazeresia subgeminata Gómez-Zurita & Cardoso, 2025 – New Caledonia
- Cazeresia thyiana (Jolivet, Verma & Mille, 2008) – New Caledonia
- Cazeresia tibialis Gómez-Zurita & Cardoso, 2025 – New Caledonia
- Cazeresia tricolor Gómez-Zurita & Cardoso, 2025 – New Caledonia
- Cazeresia wanati Gómez-Zurita & Cardoso, 2025 – New Caledonia
