= Sumuri language =

Trans–New Guinea language spoken in Indonesia

Sumuri
- Sumeri
- Tanah Merah
- Region: Sumuri District, Teluk Bintuni Regency, West Papua (Bapai Rover and Gondu River areas)
- Ethnicity: Sumuri
- Native speakers: (500 cited 1978)
- Language family: Trans–New Guinea or language isolate: Sumuri

Language codes
- ISO 639-3: tcm
- Glottolog: tana1288
- ELP: Tanahmerah
- Map: The Sumeri language of New Guinea (located at left, in the Bird's Head) The Sumeri language Other Trans–New Guinea languages Other Papuan languages Austronesian languages Uninhabited

Sumuri or Sumeri (one of two Papuan languages also known as Tanah Merah) is a language spoken in Sumuri District, Teluk Bintuni Regency on the Bomberai Peninsula by about a thousand people.

== Distribution ==
In Sumuri District of Teluk Bintuni Regency, Sumuri people reside in Tofoi (district capital), Materabu Jaya, Forada, Agoda, Saengga, Tanah Merah Baru, Onar Lama, and Onar Baru villages.

== Classification ==
In the classifications of Malcolm Ross (2005) and Timothy Usher (2020), Sumeri forms an independent branch of the Trans–New Guinea family, but Palmer (2018) classifies it as a language isolate. It does not fit in with any of the established branches of TNG, but based on what little data there is, it would seem to be closest to either the Berau Gulf branches (i.e. South Bird's Head, West Bomberai etc.) or the Asmat–Mombum languages and their relatives further east.

Sumeri has previously been linked to the Mairasi languages, but those do not share the TNG pronouns of Sumeri. The Sumeri pronouns are:

	sg	pl
1ex	na-fea	kiria
1in	na-fea	kigokomaka
2	ka-fea	ki-fia

There are no 3rd-person personal pronouns, only demonstratives. The pronouns appear to reflect pTNG *na 1sg, *ga 2sg, and *gi 2pl.

== Vocabulary ==
The following basic vocabulary words are from Voorhoeve (1975), as cited in the Trans-New Guinea database:

gloss	Tanah Merah
head	breŋka; kidaso
hair	nisa; nua
eye	ka-bita; ndou
tooth	eti; kioni
leg	kiwi; oto
louse	ia; miŋ
dog	ibe; yoku
pig	opo; tayna
bird	awə; finanaburu
egg	doŋ; no
blood	kinatera; sa
bone	naso; oro
skin	ele; katane
tree	o; ono; taya
man	do; maopa
sun	soniŋ; weti
water	bu; moda
fire	avonabe; siŋ
stone	kenade; oru
name	nigia; wado
eat	anine; taue
one	besika; naduma
two	bi; wanitabo

== See also ==
- Mairasi languages
