= Sentani language =

Papuan language spoken in Indonesia

Sentani
- Native to: Papua, Indonesia
- Region: Lake Sentani, Papua
- Native speakers: (30,000 cited 1996)
- Language family: Northwest Papuan?: Demta–Sentani; Sentani proper; Sentani
- Writing system: Latin

Language codes
- ISO 639-3: set
- Glottolog: nucl1632

Sentani or Buyaka is a Papuan language of Papua. It is spoken in about 30 scattered villages around Lake Sentani. Dialects are East, West, and Central (Ethnologue).

== Phonology ==
=== Consonants ===
Cowan (1965), pp. 3, 5, 6
	Labial	Alveolar	Palatal	Velar	Glottal
Nasal	m	n			
Plosive	p ~ b	t ~ d		k ~ q ~ x	
Fricative	f ~ ɸ	(s)		k ~ q ~ x	h ~ s
Approximant	w	l	j		

Consonants marked with a tilde ⟨~⟩ are free variants. Because of the distance between [h] and [s] in the chart, [s] is marked in parentheses, being the less common (but still free) variant.

=== Vowels ===
Cowan (1965), p. 4
	Front	Central	Back
Close	i		u
Close-mid	e		
Mid		ə	o
Open-mid	ɛ		
Open		a	

=== Central Sentani ===
Central Sentani phonology from Foley (2018):

Consonants
	Labial	Alveolar	Palatal	Velar	Glottal
Nasal	m	n			
Plosive	p			k	
Fricative	f				h
Approximant	w	l	j		
Rhotic		r			

Vowels
	Front	Central	Back
Close	i		u
Mid	e	ə	o
Open	æ	a	

== Grammar ==
=== Pronouns ===
There are four series of pronouns. The first involves stressed pronoun forms, and "is... composed with the emphatic particle jɛ". The second involves subject, postposition, and possessive usages – their vowels are allowed to be elided. The third are stressed or substantive possessives, and sometimes reflexives. The fourth involves "proclitic possessive[s]", which may have their vowels elided; they are not full affixes.

	I	II	III	IV
1sg	dəjɛ	da	dɛj	də
1pl ex	mejɛ	me	mɛj	
1pl in	ejɛ	(e)	ɛj	
2sg	wəjɛ	wa	wɛj	wə
2pl	məjɛ	ma	maj	mə
3sg	nəjɛ	na	nɛj	nə
3pl	nəjɛ	na	nɛj	nə
