= Cyclops Mountains =

Mountains in Papua province, Indonesia

Coordinates: 2°30′59″S 140°34′58″E

- Pegunungan Cyclops, Pegunungan Dafonsoro, Pegunungan Dobonsolo
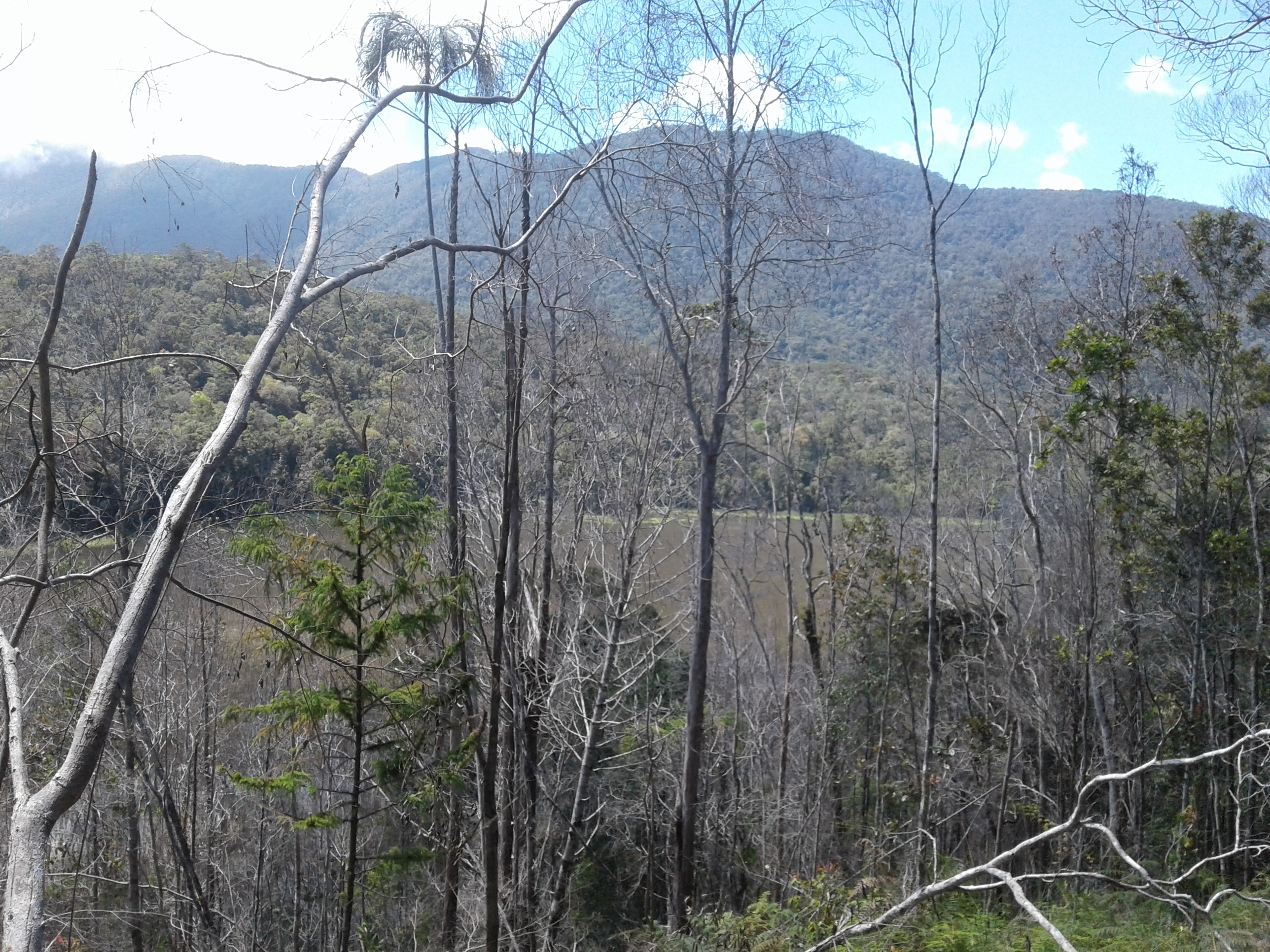

Highest point
- Elevation: 2,160 m (7,090 ft)
- Prominence: 1,893 m (6,211 ft)
- Listing: Ultra, Ribu

Geography
- Location within Indonesia
- Location: Papua, Western New Guinea, Indonesia

The Cyclops Mountains (Indonesian: Pegunungan Cyclops) are located to the west of Jayapura and north of Lake Sentani and the town of Sentani, in the Indonesian province of Papua. In Indonesian, the range is also known as Dafonsoro or (in the Sentani language) Dobonsolo. Administratively they comprise parts of the districts of Ravenirara and Depapre in the north, and the districts of Sentani Barat, Waibu, Sentani, Ebungfao and Sentani Timur to the south, all in Jayapura Regency.

Cyclops Mountains Nature Reserve
- Pegunungan Cyclops Nature Reserve
- Interactive map of Cyclops Mountains Nature Reserve
- Location: Papua, Western New Guinea
- Nearest city: Jayapura
- Area: 225 km^{2} (87 sq mi)
- Established: 1978/1995

== Geography ==
The highest point is Ifar Gunung at 2,160 m (7,090 ft) or 2,158 m (7,080 ft).

== History ==
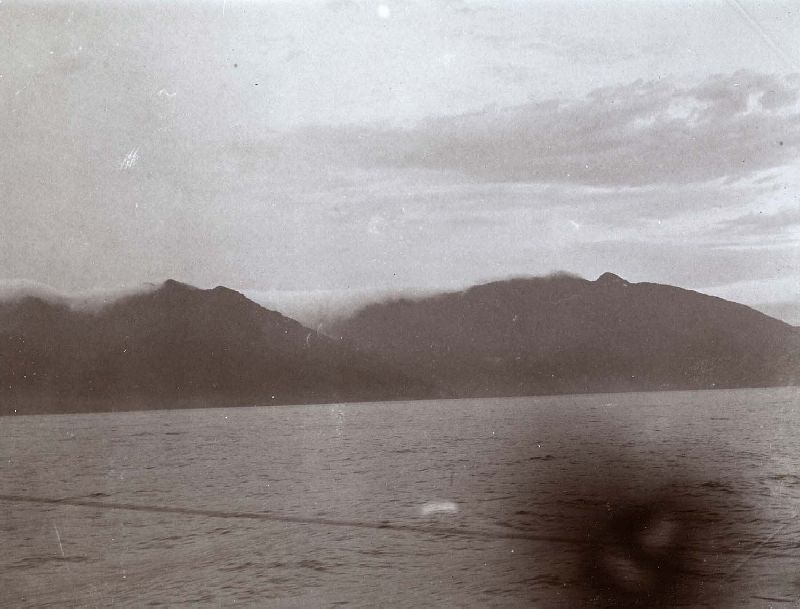
Cyclops Mountains image from 1903.

Parts of the range have long been considered sacred by local Papuan people.

The Cyclops Mountains were given this name by Louis de Bougainville, who saw them from a distance while sailing along the north coast of New Guinea.

In the 1930s Evelyn Cheesman spent time in this area studying the insect fauna. In 1978, and reaffirmed in 1995, the Cyclops Mountains were designated as a nature reserve. A biodiversity assessment expedition conducted by a partnership between the University of Oxford, Indonesian NGO Yayasan Pelayanan Papua Nenda (YAPPENDA), Cenderawasih University (UNCEN), Papua BBKSDA, and the National Research and Innovation Agency of Indonesia (BRIN) concluded in 2023 found a number of species new to science.

== Ecology ==
The portions of the range above 1,000 meters are part of the Northern New Guinea montane rain forests ecoregion. The lower slopes and surrounding lowlands are in the Northern New Guinea lowland rain and freshwater swamp forests ecoregion.

The mountains are rich in biodiversity, with many endemic species found there. Many remain undescribed by scientists due to the mountains' remoteness and impassable terrain. The Cyclops long-beaked echidna (Zaglossus attenboroughi) is unique to the mountains. It is named after naturalist David Attenborough. A unique cave system first described in 2023 by a multinational team led by University of Oxford found a number of endemic species. The mountains are also home to a tree-dwelling shrimp, which has adapted to exist outside of water due to the consistently high humidity, as well as Mayr's honeyeater, which was thought extinct since 2008.

A species of lizard, Emoia cyclops (Cyclops emo skink), is named for the Cyclops Mountains.
