= Kaimana Regency =

Regency in West Papua, Indonesia

Kaimana Regency Kabupaten Kaimana
- Regency
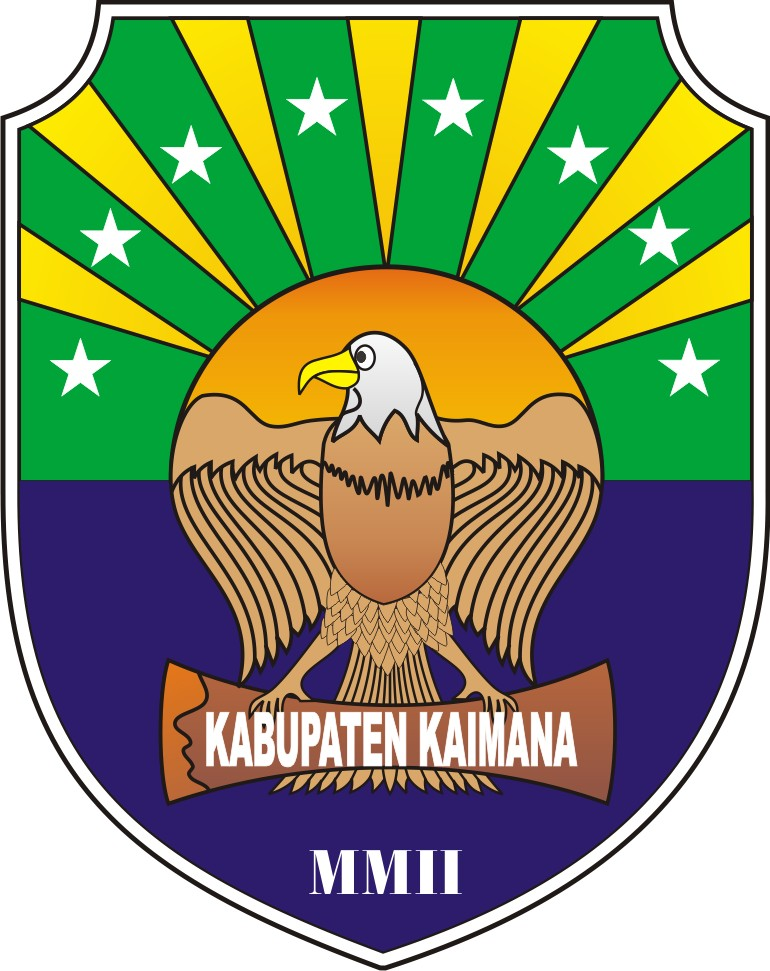
- Coat of arms

- Location in West Papua

- Location in Indonesia
- Coordinates: 3.6609°S 133.7745°E
- Country: Indonesia
- Province: West Papua
- Capital: Kaimana

Government
  - Regent: Hasan Achmad
  - Vice Regent: Isak Waryensi

Area
  - Total: 18,500 km^{2} (7,100 sq mi)

Population (mid 2024 estimate)
  - Total: 64,140
  - Density: 3.47/km^{2} (8.98/sq mi)

Demographics
  - Religion: Islam 50,63% Christianity 49,32% –Protestantism 39,98% –Catholicism 9,34% Hinduism 0,06%
- Time zone: UTC+9 (IEST)
- Area code: (+62) 957
- Website: kaimanakab.go.id

Kaimana Regency is a regency in the south of West Papua province of Indonesia. It covers an area of 18,500 sq. km, and had a population of 46,249 at the 2010 Census and 62,256 at the 2020 Census; the official estimate as of mid-2024 was 64,140 (comprising 32,898 males and 31,242 females). The administrative centre is the town of Kaimana. The Mairasi languages are spoken in the regency, among other languages.

The regency includes the western portion of the Bird's Neck Isthmus and the southeastern portion of the Bomberai Peninsula.

== Administrative districts ==
The regency comprises seven districts (distrik), tabulated below with their areas and their populations at the 2010 Census and the 2020 Census, together with the official estimates as of mid-2024. The table also includes the locations of the district administrative centres, the number of administrative villages in each district (totaling 84 rural kampung and 2 urban kelurahan), and its post code.

Kode Kemendagri	Name of District (distrik)	Area in km^{2}	Pop'n 2010 Census	Pop'n 2020 Census	Pop'n mid 2024 Estimate	Admin centre	No. of villages	Post code
92.08.02	Buruway	2,650	3,500	4,178	4,256	Kambala	10	98123
92.08.03	Teluk Arguni Atas (Upper Arguni Bay)	3,010	3,530	5,022	5,328	Bofuwer	24	98111
92.08.06	Teluk Arguni Bawah (Lower Arguni Bay)	1,990	2,384	3,013	3,688	Tanusan	15	98112
92.08.01	Kaimana	2,095	29,593	43,251	43,023	Kaimana Kota	19 ^{(a)}	98113
92.08.05	Kambrauw	755	2,216	2,218	2,615	Waho	7	98114
92.08.04	Teluk Etna (Etna Bay)	4,195	3,107	3,049	3,066	Rurumo	5	98121
92.08.07	Yamor	3,805	1,919	1,525	1,929	Urubika	6	98122
	Total	18,500	46,249	62,256	64,140	Kaimana	86	

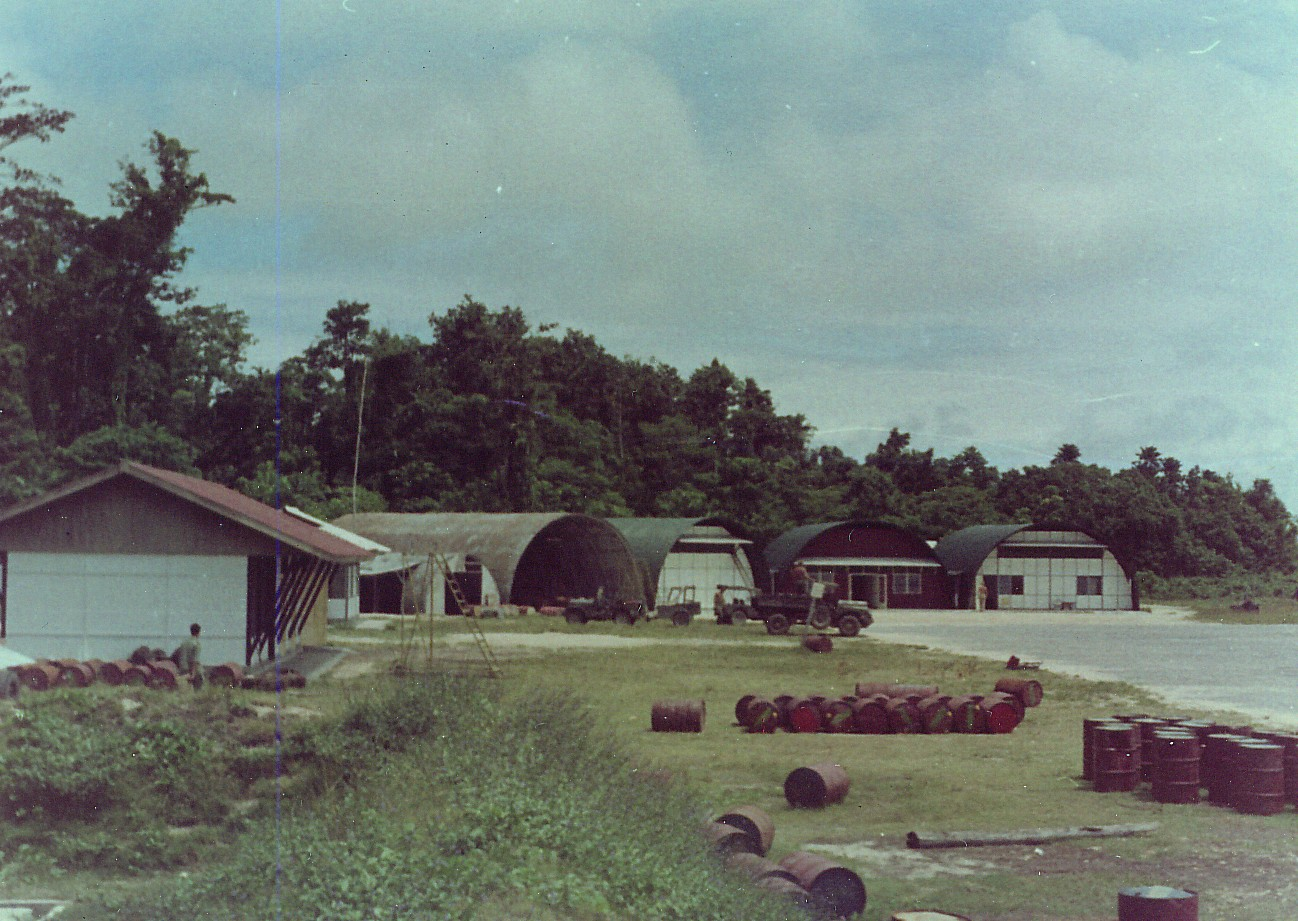
Kaimana airfield in 1962, when Western New Guinea was still under Dutch administration

Note: (a) including 2 kelurahan - Kaimana Kota (town) with 14,581 inhabitants in 2024 (34% of the district population), and Krooy with 12,195 inhabitants in 2024 (28%).

== Offshore Islands ==
Kaimana Regency contains over 500 separate offshore islands, spread over the five districts with coastlines. Kaimana District includes at least 280 islands, of which the largest are Pulau Namatota, Pulau Aiduma and Pulau Dramai. There are at least 62 islands in Teluk Etna District, of which the largest is Pulau Kayumerah. Teluk Arguni Bawah District includes 31 islands. There are 14 islands in Buruway District, of which the largest are Pulau Adi (the regency's largest offshore island, including the village of Manggawitu) and Pulau Kelimala. Kambrau District includes 4 islands.

== Demographics ==
=== Ethnic groups ===
The customs in Kaimana Regency, which because of its strategic location as a stopover (transit), have been influenced by culture from outside (social interaction) so that the indigenous values of this area have been acculturated by the surrounding cultural values. People who live in inland mountainous areas have not been much influenced by outside interactions, while residents of coastal areas have had a lot of this influence through marriage, music/dance and clothing. Most of the inhabitants of Kaimana Kota District are in the villages. The inhabitants of Kaimana District, who are local tribes, are the largest population, followed by non-indigenous people (who come from outside areas) who are scattered in several villages in the Kaimana Kota kelurahan, such as Seram and Kaki Air. The non-indigenous population in these two villages is a spontaneous migration of the population from Maluku and South Sulawesi and the island of Java, who live in a pattern of clustered settlements in separate pockets of settlement. Indigenous people are found in the villages inside and outside the urban kaimana kota. The indigenous tribes include the Irarutu, Mairasi, Kambrau and Kowiai. The distribution of the Irarutu tribe is in the southern area of the Kaimana city and the tribe originates from the Teluk Arguni District. The Mairasi tribe originates from the interior of the eastern part of Kaimana and spread across the North East coast of Kaimana District. The Kambrau tribe originates from the Teluk Kambrau District, Kaimana District and the Arguni Bay area and is spread across the southern and northern coasts of the Kaimana Kota kelurahan. The Koiwai tribe originates from the western area of Buruway District and the northern area of the Kaimana District. This tribe mostly inhabits archipelagic areas.

=== Religion ===
Religion in Kaimana (2023)
1. Protestantism (50.5%)
2. Islam (40.4%)
3. Roman Catholic (9.01%)
4. Hinduism (0.08%)
5. Buddhism (0.00%)
6. Others (0.00%)

The composition of the religious adherents in Kaimana Regency is quite diverse, including followers of Protestantism, Islam, Catholicism, and Hinduism. Members of different religions generally get along quite well. Based on data released by the Kaimana Regency Government in 2023, the majority of the population is Christian (59.51% of the population), with 50.5% being Protestant and 9.01% being Catholic. Around 40.4% of the population follows Islam, while 0.08% follows Hinduism.
