= Lake Sentani =

Lake in Papua, Indonesia

- Danau Sentani
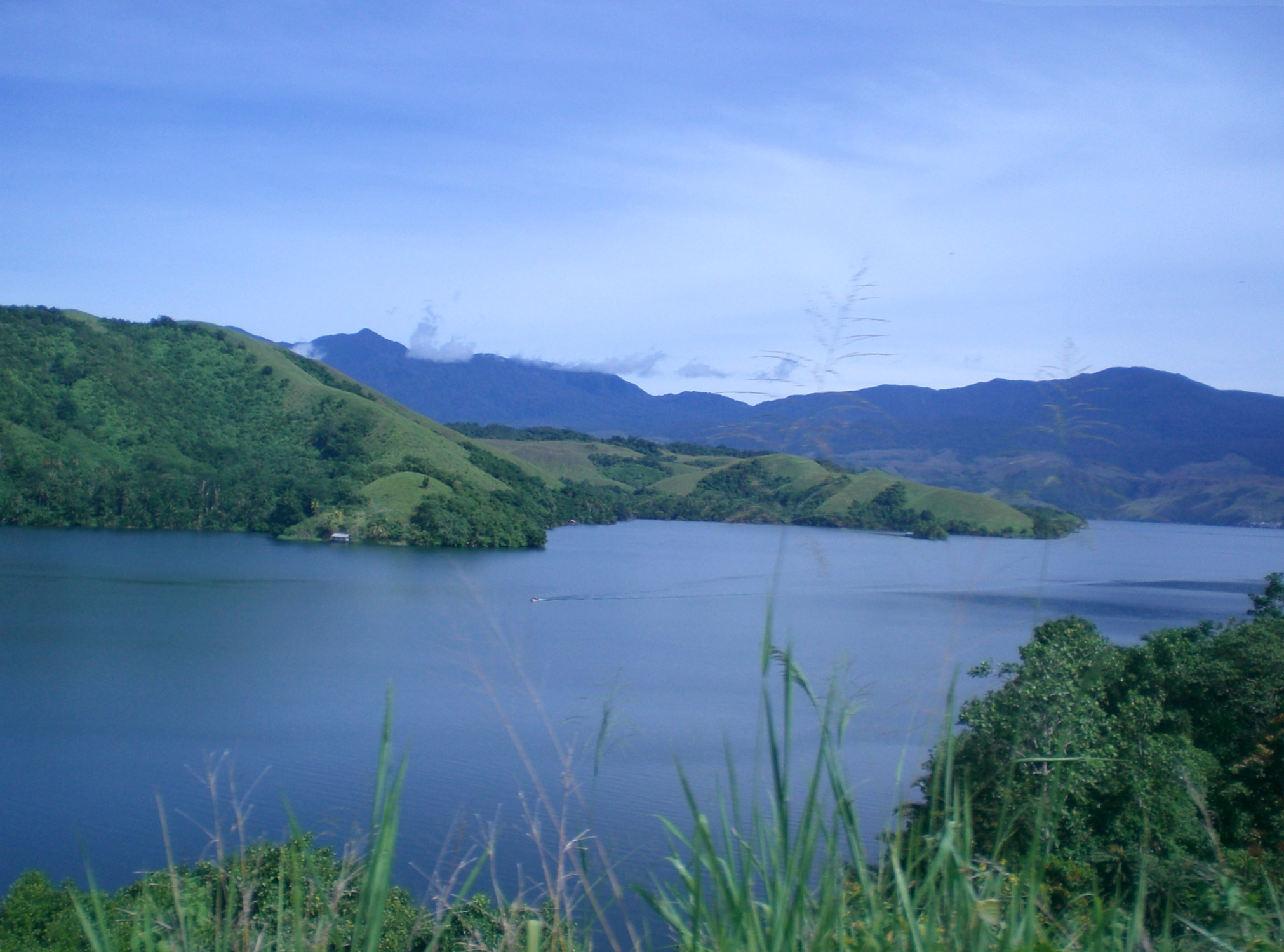

- Location within Papua (province)
- Location: Jayapura Regency, Papua, Indonesia
- Coordinates: 2.61°S 140.56°E
- Catchment area: 600 km^{2} (230 sq mi)
- Max. length: 28 km (17 mi)
- Max. width: 19 km (12 mi)
- Surface area: 104 km^{2} (40 sq mi)
- Max. depth: 52 m (171 ft)
- Residence time: Short
- Surface elevation: 73 m (240 ft)
- Settlements: Sentani

Lake Sentani is a tropical, shallow, and at low-altitude open lake located at the northeast extremity of the Jayapura Regency in the Indonesian province of Papua, about 20 kilometres (12 mi) from the provincial capital, Jayapura City. It is located just to the south of the town of Sentani.

The lake, which is considered by the local population as the home of the rainbows, is part of the Cyclops Strict Nature Reserve and contains several endemic species of fish.

== Hydrology ==
Lake Sentani lies at the foot of the Mesozoic mafic and ultramafic rocks of the Cyclops ophiolite mountains in a fault-controlled depression at an elevation of 73 metres (240 ft) above sea level. Sentani is an irregularly shaped body with approximate maximum length extending from east to west of 28 kilometres (17 mi) and, from north to south, 19 kilometres (12 mi) of breadth. With a surface area of 104 square kilometres (40 sq mi), Lake Sentani is the largest lake of the Intan Jaya region.

Lake Sentani receives its water primarily from direct precipitation with an average annual rainfall around the lake of about 2 metres (6.6 ft), and by mountain streams. The average evaporation on the lake is about 0.4 metres (1.3 ft) with seasonal variation in inflow. The lake outflows into the Jafuri and Tami rivers to the Pacific Ocean near the Papua New Guinea border.

== Geology ==
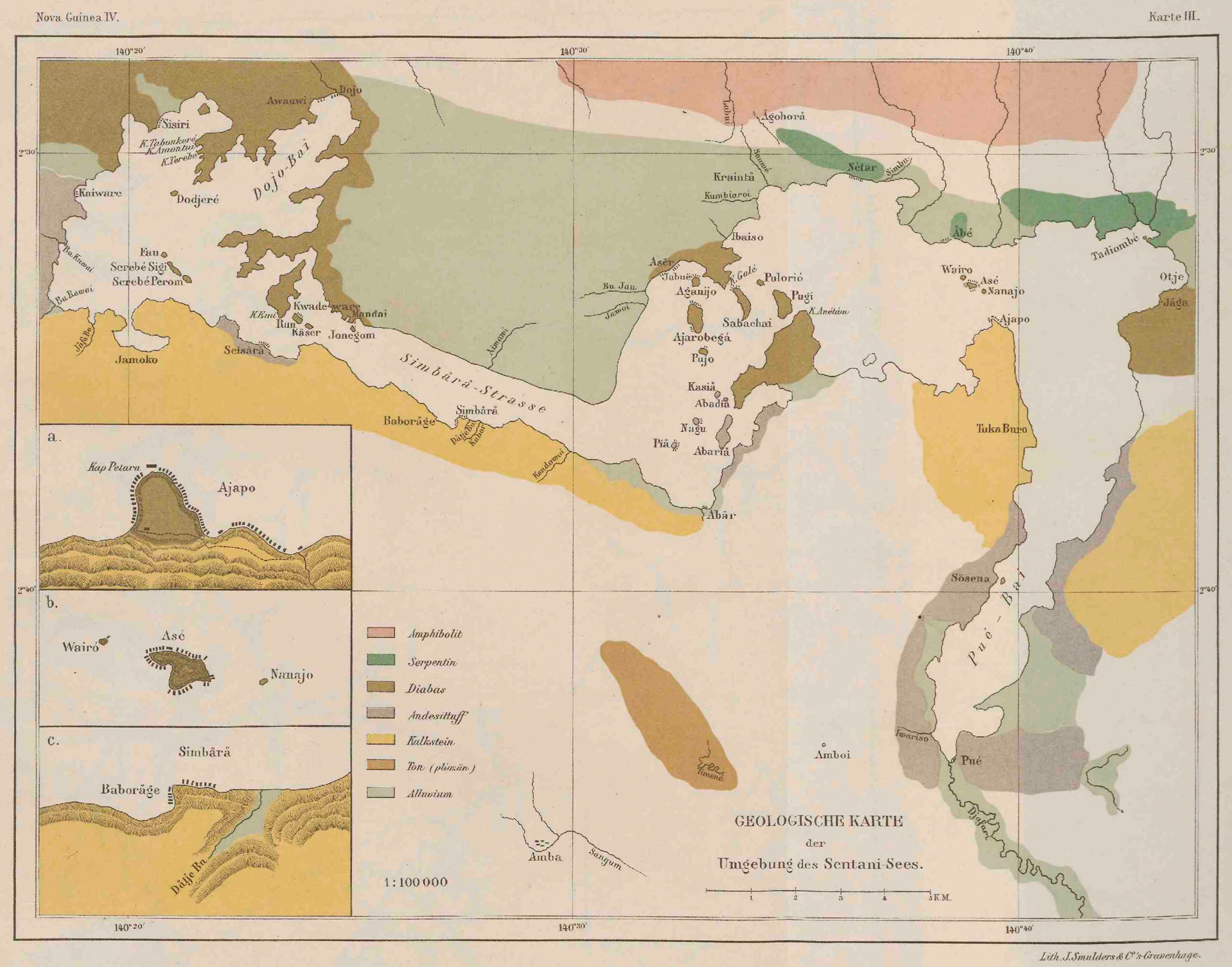
Geological map of the surroundings of Sentani Lake, from the North New Guinea Expedition (1903)

Lake Sentani, the best studied of Irian Jaya lakes, is relatively stable and intact. It is widely believed to have evolved by the tectonic damming and uplift of an arm of the sea, but such a connection has not been demonstrated yet.

== Natural history ==
Lake Sentani is thermally stable, with temperatures ranging from 29 to 32 °C (84 to 90 °F) in the top 10 metres (33 ft); the surface pH is 6.2–6.8, and plankton levels are low at 1–2 mg/L except in the westernmost basin, where water circulation is limited, turbidity is doubled, and seasonal algal blooms, with resultant fish mortality. Preliminary bottom sediment samples from the eastern part of the lake have yielded sparse populations of arcellacean microfauna, dominated by Centropyxid types. In other parts of the world these species are found associated with brackish or polluted water conditions, raising the possibility that there is residual salinity in the deeper parts of the lake.

It may be small, but it harbors 34 species of fish, of which 13 are resident natives, 8 anadromous and 13 introduced. Besides having its own species of rainbowfish (Sentani rainbowfish and red rainbowfish), Lake Sentani is also home to two other fish species that cannot be found anywhere else, the Sentani gudgeon and Sentani goby. Sawfish up to 3 metres (9.8 ft) were well known in the lake until the 1970s and are a common motif in traditional Sentani art, but appear to have been extirpated. Fish are extensively raised in ponds and cages around the perimeter of the lake and the introduction of species (particularly carp and tilapia) has been both accidental and intentional.

In this part of the world and at this latitude rainbows are visible only after a hard rain, but in Lake Sentani they are visible all the time, at least, by seeing the Sentani rainbowfish that, along with many others, are unique to this lake.

== History ==
During World War II the United States Navy built a naval base at the Lake as part of Naval Base Hollandia. The base operated from 1944 to 1945.

== Economy ==
Many of the Sentani people, who inhabit the islands, perimeter and environs of the lake, still have a traditional subsistence economy based on fishing and sago harvesting. This has been sustainable for centuries but local reports suggest that catch yields have diminished in recent years. Whether this is a result of overfishing (as a result of population growth and/or market pressure), pollution or introduction of foreign species is not established. Many of the residents occupy dwellings built on posts over the lake, which thus serves as a depository for sewage, leading to locally high coliform bacteria counts, but also to nutrient enrichment. Water hyacinth (Eichornia crassipes), introduced since the early 1970s, has become a major plant pest and may contribute to the decline of some species.

Much of the mountainous terrain between the north shore of the lake and the ocean falls within the Cyclops Strict Nature Reserve. The future management of the reserve and buffer zone, and the environmental quality of the lake, are strongly interdependent. Recently a major reforestation project of grassland on the slopes surrounding the lake has been initiated, with the support of forest companies operating in Papua. This ecoregion is located within one of the most populated areas of New Guinea, but it is threatened by overfishing, the introduction of new species, which could be harmful to the endemic species in this lake. and aquaculture. A major sustainable development issues for the inhabitants of the lake and surroundings is the existing proposal to build a hydroelectric power plant through a dam placed on the Jafuri river. Several feasibility and environmental impact studies have been published, but the cost/benefit consequences of this project have not been released yet.

== Notable attractions ==
On a hill at the northwest of the Lake, there is a megalithic and petroglyphic place called Doyo Lama. Some archaeologists think that it was built under Micronesian influence.

== See also ==
- List of drainage basins of Indonesia
- Sentani languages
