= List of endangered languages in Indonesia =

Language Endangerment Status by UNESCO Atlas of the World's Languages in Danger category

Extinct (EX)
- Extinct (EX): (lists)

Endangered
- Critically Endangered (CR); Severely Endangered (SE); Definitely Endangered (DE); Vulnerable (VU): (list); (list); (list); (list)

Safe
- Safe (NE): no list
- Other categories
- Revived (RE); Constructed (CL): (list); (list)
- Related topics: Atlas of the World's Languages in Danger; Endangered Languages Project; Ethnologue; Unclassified language; List of languages by total number of speakers
- UNESCO Atlas of the World's; Languages in Danger categories

An endangered language is a language that it is at risk of falling out of use, generally because it has few surviving speakers. If it loses all of its native speakers, it becomes an extinct language. UNESCO defines four levels of language endangerment between "safe" (not endangered) and "extinct":

- Vulnerable
- Definitely endangered
- Severely endangered
- Critically endangered

Language	Family	Locations	Status	Speakers	Ref
Alune language	Austronesian	Maluku	Vulnerable	17,000	
Amahai language	Austronesian	Maluku	Critically endangered	50	
Ampibabo Lauje language	Austronesian	Sulawesi	Vulnerable	44,000	
Andio language	Austronesian	Sulawesi	Vulnerable	335	
Anus language	Austronesian	Papua	Severely endangered	320	
Aputai language	Austronesian	Maluku	Critically endangered	11,000	
Arguni language	Austronesian	Papua	Vulnerable	300	
As language	Austronesian	Papua	Vulnerable	5–6	
Auye language	Trans–New Guinea	Papua	Vulnerable	600	
Awera language	Lakes Plain	Papua	Vulnerable	70	
Awyi language	Border	Papua	Vulnerable	350	
Bahonsuai language	Austronesian	Sulawesi	Definitely endangered	200	
Baleasang language	Austronesian	Sulawesi	Definitely endangered	3,200	
Baras language	Austronesian	Sulawesi	Severely endangered	430,000	
Bedoanas language	Austronesian	Papua	Vulnerable	180	
Benggoi language	Austronesian	Maluku	Definitely endangered	350	
Besoa language	Austronesian	Sulawesi	Vulnerable	10,000	
Biak language	Austronesian	Papua	Vulnerable	70,000	
Boano language	Austronesian	Sulawesi	Vulnerable	2,700	
Bonerif	Tor–Kwerba	Papua	Critically endangered	200	
Bonggo language	Austronesian	Papua	Severely endangered	790	
Budong-Budong language	Austronesian	Sulawesi	Critically endangered	180	
Burate language	East Cendrawasih	Papua	Severely endangered	100	
Busoa language	Austronesian	Sulawesi	Vulnerable	2,300	
Dabra language	Lakes Plain	Papua	Vulnerable	300	
Dakka language	Austronesian	Sulawesi	Vulnerable	1,000	
Damal language	Trans–New Guinea	Papua	Vulnerable	14,000	
Dampelas language	Austronesian	Sulawesi	Definitely endangered	2,000	
Demisa language	East Cendrawasih	Papua	Definitely endangered	400	
Dondo language	Austronesian	Sulawesi	Vulnerable	13,000	
Doutai language	Lakes Plain	Papua	Severely endangered	70	
Dubu language	Pauwasi	Papua	Vulnerable	220	
Duriankere language	Trans–New Guinea	Papua	Critically endangered	0	
Dusner language	Austronesian	Papua	Critically endangered	3	
Emplawas language	Austronesian	Maluku	Definitely endangered	250	
Enggano language	Austronesian	Sumatra	Vulnerable	700	
Erokwanas language	Austronesian	Papua	Vulnerable	<200	
Fayu language	Lakes Plain	Papua	Vulnerable	1,400	
Foya language	Language isolate	Papua	Critically endangered	300	
Gebe language	Austronesian	Maluku	Vulnerable	2,700	
Gorap language	Malay creole	Maluku	Definitely endangered	1,000	
Helong language	Austronesian	Nusa Tenggara	Severely endangered	14,000	
Hoti language	Austronesian	Maluku	Critically endangered	0	
Hulung language	Austronesian	Maluku	Critically endangered	<10	
Ibu language	West Papuan	Maluku	Critically endangered	12,000	
Iresim language	Austronesian	Papua	Severely endangered	70	
Isirawa language	Tor–Kwerba	Papua	Vulnerable	1,800	
Itik language	Tor–Kwerba	Papua	Vulnerable	80	
Javindo Creole language	Dutch creole	Java	Critically endangered	10–99	
Kadai language	Austronesian	Maluku	Definitely endangered	4,900	
Kaibobo language	Austronesian	Maluku	Definitely endangered	500	
Kaiy language	Lakes Plain	Papua	Vulnerable	220	
Kalao language	Austronesian	Sulawesi	Definitely endangered	500	
Kamarian language	Austronesian	Maluku	Critically endangered	0	
Kao language	West Papuan	Maluku	Definitely endangered	1,250	
Kapori language	Tor–Kwerba	Papua	Critically endangered	200	
Karas language	Trans–New Guinea	Papua	Severely endangered	100	
Kayupulau language	Austronesian	Papua	Critically endangered	50	
Keder language	Tor–Kwerba	Papua	Severely endangered	370	
Kembra language	Pauwasi	Papua	Critically endangered	20	
Kodeoha language	Austronesian	Sulawesi	Vulnerable	1,500	
Kofei language	East Cendrawasih	Papua	Severely endangered	100	
Koneraw language	Trans–New Guinea	Papua	Vulnerable	1,200	
Koroni language	Austronesian	Sulawesi	Definitely endangered	23,000	
Kowiai language	Austronesian	Papua	Vulnerable	600	
Kwansu language	Tor–Kwerba	Papua	Vulnerable	500	
Kwerisa language	Lakes Plain	Papua	Critically endangered	15	
Laiyolo language	Austronesian	Sulawesi	Definitely endangered	800	
Lauje language	Austronesian	Sulawesi	Vulnerable	44,000	
Legenyem language	Austronesian	Papua	Vulnerable	250	
Lemolang language	Austronesian	Sulawesi	Vulnerable	2,000	
Lengilu language	Austronesian	Kalimantan	Critically endangered	3	
Liki language	Austronesian	Papua	Critically endangered	11	
Lisela language	Austronesian	Maluku	Vulnerable	11,900	
Lola language	Austronesian	Maluku	Vulnerable	900	
Lolak language	Austronesian	Sulawesi	Critically endangered	<50	
Lom language	Austronesian	Sumatra	Critically endangered	340,000	
Loun language	Austronesian	Maluku	Critically endangered	0	
Mander language	Tor–Kwerba	Papua	Critically endangered	200	
Mansim language	West Papuan	Papua	Critically endangered	50	
Maremgi language	Tor–Kwerba	Papua	Definitely endangered	0	
Massep language	Language isolate	Papua	Critically endangered	25	
Momuna language	Trans–New Guinea	Papua	Vulnerable	2,000	
Mor language	Trans–New Guinea	Papua	Severely endangered	700	
Moraori language	Trans–New Guinea	Papua	Severely endangered	50	
Napu language	Austronesian	Sulawesi	Vulnerable	6,100	
Narau language	Kaure–Kosare	Papua	Severely endangered	450	
Nila language (Seram Island), Nila	Austronesian	Maluku	Definitely endangered	0	
Nusa Laut language	Austronesian	Maluku	Critically endangered	0	
Obokuitai language	Lakes Plain	Papua	Vulnerable	120	
Oirata language	Trans–New Guinea	Maluku	Definitely endangered	1,200	
Onin language	Austronesian	Papua	Vulnerable	500	
Ormu language	Austronesian	Papua	Vulnerable	500	
Padoe language	Austronesian	Sulawesi	Vulnerable	5,000	
Palu'e language	Austronesian	Nusa Tenggara	Definitely endangered	10,000	
Panasuan language	Austronesian	Sulawesi	Definitely endangered	800	
Paulohi language	Austronesian	Maluku	Critically endangered	50	
Pauwi language	Lower Mamberamo	Papua	Vulnerable	200	
Peco' Creole language	Dutch Creole	Java	Critically endangered	0	
Pendau language	Austronesian	Sulawesi	Vulnerable	4,000	
Pyu language	Language isolate	Papua	Severely endangered	250	
Rahambuu language	Austronesian	Sulawesi	Vulnerable	350	
Salas language	Austronesian	Maluku	Severely endangered	50	
Saluan language	Austronesian	Sulawesi	Vulnerable	76,000	
Saparua language	Austronesian	Maluku	Definitely endangered	1500	
Saponi language	Language isolate	Papua	Critically endangered	4	
Sause language	Tor–Kwerba	Papua	Severely endangered	250	
Senggi language	Border	Papua	Vulnerable	250	
Serili language	Austronesian	Maluku	Vulnerable	330	
Sobei language	Austronesian	Papua	Definitely endangered	1,000	
Taba language	Austronesian	Maluku	Vulnerable	20,000+	
Taikat language	Border	Papua	Definitely endangered	500	
Taje language	Austronesian	Sulawesi	Critically endangered	350	
Tajio language	Austronesian	Sulawesi	Vulnerable	12,000	
Taloki language	Austronesian	Sulawesi	Definitely endangered	23,000	
Talondo language	Austronesian	Sulawesi	Definitely endangered	1,200	
Tarpia language	Austronesian	Papua	Severely endangered	630	
Tause language	Lakes Plain	Papua	Vulnerable	500	
Taworta language	Lakes Plain	Papua	Vulnerable	300	
Te'un language (Seram Island)	Austronesian	Maluku	Definitely endangered	1,200	
Tialo language	Austronesian	Sulawesi	Vulnerable	30,000	
Tobati language	Austronesian	Papua	Severely endangered	100	
Tofanma language	Pauwasi	Papua	Vulnerable	250	
Tomadino language	Austronesian	Sulawesi	Definitely endangered	600	
Tombelala language	Austronesian	Sulawesi	Vulnerable	1,100	
Toratán language	Austronesian	Sulawesi	Definitely endangered	500	
Totoli language	Austronesian	Sulawesi	Vulnerable	25,000	
Uhunduni language	Trans–New Guinea	Papua	Vulnerable	14,000	
Ujir language	Austronesian	Maluku	Definitely endangered	1,000	
Usku language	Pauwasi	Papua	Critically endangered	20–160	
Wano language	Trans–New Guinea	Papua	Definitely endangered	1,000	
Wari language	Austronesian	Papua	Definitely endangered	150	
Waru language	Austronesian	Sulawesi	Definitely endangered	350	
Woria language	East Cendrawasih	Papua	Critically endangered	5	
Wotu language	Austronesian	Sulawesi	Vulnerable	500	
Yoki language	Lower Mamberamo	Papua	Severely endangered	200	
