= List of districts of Central Papua =

The province of Central Papua (Provinsi Papua Tengah) in Indonesia is divided into eight kabupaten (regencies) which in turn are divided administratively into districts, known as distrik under the law of 2001 on "special autonomy for Papua province".

== List ==
The districts of Central Papua and their respective regencies are as follows (as of July 2022). Administrative villages (desa in rural areas and kabupaten in urban areas) are also listed for each district.

| Regency | District | Languages in district | Administrative villages |
|---|---|---|---|
| Deiyai | Bowobado | | Diita, Kopai Dua (II), Kopai Satu (I), Mudetadi, Woge, Yewadide |
| Deiyai | Kapiraya | | Idego, Kapiraya (Komauto), Mogodagi, Uwe Onagei, Yamouwitina |
| Deiyai | Tigi | | Amago, Atouda, Bamou II, Bomau I, Bomou III, Buwoudimi, Ibodiyo, Idege, Ikiyawo, Motano, Mugouda, Okomakebo, Okomotadi, Oneibo, Peku, Ugiya, Waghete I, Waghete II, Yaba, Yaba II |
| Deiyai | Tigi Barat | | Ayatei, Demago, Digibagata, Digikotu, Diyai, Diyai II, Epanai, Gakokebo, Jinidaba, Kogemani, Maatadi, Meyepa, Obai, Onago, Onago II, Piyekedimi, Tenedagi, Wagomani, Widimei, Widuwakiya, Yagu, Yipai |
| Deiyai | Tigi Timur | | Bagou, Bagou II, Bagumoma, Dagokebo, Dakebo, Damabagata, Edagotadi, Idayodagi, Ipoke, Kokobaya, Pekepa, Udaugida, Waitakotu, Watiyai |
| Dogiyai | Dogiyai | | Bobobutu (Bobubutu), Denemani, Dogimani (Abgoigi), Egebutu, Idadagi, Kegemani (Kigamani), Makidimi (Makidini), Motito, Pona (Sukamaju) |
| Dogiyai | Kamu | | Bukapa (Bugapa), Dikiyouwo (Dikiyouwa / Dikiyouma / Tokapo), Ekemanida (Ekemenida), Idakotu, Ikebo (Moanemani), Kimipugi (Kimupugi), Mauwa, Putapa (Uputapa) |
| Dogiyai | Kamu Selatan | | Bogoyo Teugi (Bogiyateugi), Botumuma (Botumoma), Digikebo, Matadi, Obaibega, Pouwouda (Pouwoda / Pouwuoda), Puweta / Pueta I, Puweta / Pueta II, Tuwaida, Ugikagouda, Ugikebo, Yepo (Makidimi) |
| Dogiyai | Kamu Timur | | Boduda, Bokaibutu (Bukaibuto), Bonauwo (Bunauwo), Deiyapa (Deiyepa), Nuwa (Nua), Ugapuga, Yotapuga |
| Dogiyai | Kamu Utara (Ikrar / Ikrat) | | Duntek (Dumtek), Ekimani (Ekiwani), Idakebo, Ikrar, Koyakago (Kuyakago), Mogou, Obayo, Pugatadi Dua (II), Pugatadi Satu (I), Yametadi (Yawetadi) |
| Dogiyai | Mapia | | Abaimaida, Bobomani (Bomomani), Bonakunu, Dawaikunu, Diyoudimi, Magode (Magone), Obaikagopa (Abaugi) |
| Dogiyai | Mapia Barat | | Abouyaga, Maikotu, Taubaikebo (Toubaikebo / Tobaikebo), Yegoukotu |
| Dogiyai | Mapia Tengah | | Adauwo, Atou (Tuamani), Diyeugi, Gabaikunu, Magaikebo (Megaikebo), Modio, Piyakunu, Putapa, Timopa (Timepa), Upibega (Ukudawata) |
| Dogiyai | Piyaiye (Sukikai) | | Apogomakida (Aporomakida), Deniyode (Deneiode), Egipa, Ideduwa, Kegata, Tipaugi, Ukagu, Yegiyepa (Yegeiyepa) |
| Dogiyai | Sukikai Selatan | | Iyaro, Sukikai, Unito, Wigoumakida |
| Intan Jaya | Agisiga | | Agisiga, Danggoa, Jenetapa Najasiga, Kombogosiga, Mbamogo, Nabia, Soali, Tambage, Tousiga, Unabundoga |
| Intan Jaya | Biandoga | | Aneya, Biandoga, Bugalaga, Danggatadi, Kalawa, Kigitadi, Maniuwo, Maolagi, Moyomataga, Ndabatadi, Pagamba, Pitadi, Tunggapo, Ular Merah, Yagaito, Yanei |
| Intan Jaya | Hitadipa | | Balamai, Danggomba, Hitadipa, Janamba, Kulapa, Pugisiga, Sakumba, Soagama, Wabui |
| Intan Jaya | Homeyo | | Agapa, Bamba, Bilai Dua / Sanepa, Bonogo, Bubisiga, Degesiga, Engganenga, Hiyabu, Hugitapa, Kendetapa, Kobae, Mapa, Maya, Mbomogo, Nggagemba, Ogeapa, Pogapa, Sanepa, Selemama, Waiagepa, Zombandoga |
| Intan Jaya | Sugapa | | Bilogai, Buwisiga, Eknemba, Emondi, Kumlagupa, Mamba, Mbilusiga, Mindau, Ndugusiga, Pesiga, Puyagiya, Sambili, Titigi, Wandoga, Yalai, Yokatapa, Yoparu |
| Intan Jaya | Tomosiga | | Bigasiga, Dapiaga, Duginggobo, Gaimigi, Hegenagai, Jawasiga, Pewesiga, Sugulubagala, Tomosiga |
| Intan Jaya | Ugimba | | Bunaopa, Dukendopa, Nggamagae, Pigabu, Teteopa, Ugimba |
| Intan Jaya | Wandai | | Debasiga, Debasiga Dua, Dubandoga (Dubasiga), Hulapuga, Isandoga, Jae, Mbugulo, Mogalo, Sabisa |
| Mimika | Agimuga | | Amungun, Aramsolki, Emkoma Halama, Emogoma, Fakafuku, Hinat Untung, Kiliarma, Masasimamo |
| Mimika | Alama | | Alama, Bemoki, Enggin, Geselema, Jenggelo, Kilmit, Purua, Senawak, Tagaralma, Unimogom, Wuarem |
| Mimika | Amar | | Amar, Ipiri, Kawar, Manuare, Paripi, Yaraya |
| Mimika | Hoya | | Hoya, Jawa, Jinonin, Kulama Ogom, Mamontoga, Puti (Puti Semula) |
| Mimika | Iwaka | | Iwaka, Limau Asri Barat, Limau Asri Timur, Mulia Kencana, Naena Muktipura, Pigapu, Wangirja |
| Mimika | Jila | | Amua Ogom, Bunaraugin, Diloa, Diloa Dua, Jengkon, Jila, Noemun, Pasir Putih, Pilik Ogom, Pusuwe, Umpliga, Wandud |
| Mimika | Jita | | Bulumen, Jaitak, Kanmapiri, Noema, Sempan Timur, Sumapro, Wacakam, Waituku, Wapu, Wenin |
| Mimika | Kuala Kencana | | Bhintuka, Jimbi, Karang Senang, Karya Kencana, Kuala Kencana, Mimika Gunung, Tioka Kencana, Utikini Baru, Utikini Dua, Utikini Tiga |
| Mimika | Kwamki Narama | | Amole, Bintang Lima, Damai, Harapan, Lamopi, Landun Mekar, Meekurima, Olaroa, Tunas Matoa, Walani |
| Mimika | Mimika Barat | | Aparuka, Apuri, Atapo, Kiura, Kokonao, Migiwia, Mimika |
| Mimika | Mimika Barat Jauh | | Aiduna (Aindua), Potowai Buru (Potowayburu / Potowaiburu), Tapomai (Tapormai), Umar, Yapkoka (Yapakopa) |
| Mimika | Mimika Barat Tengah | | Akar, Kapiraya, Kipia, Mapar, Mapuruku (Mapuruka / Mupuruka), Pronggo, Uta, Wakia, Wumuka |
| Mimika | Mimika Baru | | Dingo Narama, Hangaitji, Kebun Sirih, Koperapoka, Kwamki, Minabua, Nayaro, Otomona, Pasar Sentral, Perintis, Sempan, Timika Indah, Timika Jaya, Wanagon |
| Mimika | Mimika Tengah | | Aikawapuka, Atuka, Kamoro, Keakwa, Tiwaka |
| Mimika | Mimika Timur | | Hiripau, Kaugapa, Muare, Poumako, Tipuka, Wania |
| Mimika | Mimika Timur Jauh | | Amamapare, Ayuka, Fanamo, Ohotya, Omawita |
| Mimika | Tembagapura | | Aingogin, Arwanop, Baluni, Banigogom, Banti Dua, Doliningokngin, Jagamin, Jongkogama, Meningimponogama, Noselanop, Opitawak, Tembagapura, TSinga (T Singa), Waa |
| Mimika | Wania | | Inauga, Kadun Jaya, Kamoro Jaya, Mandiri Jaya, Mawokau Jaya, Nawaripi, Wonosari Jaya |
| Nabire | Dipa | | Dikia (Dikiya), Epouwa (Epowa), Jainoa, Jigikebo, Tagauto (Tadautu) |
| Nabire | Makimi | | Biha, Lagari Jaya (Legari Jaya), Maidei, Makimi, Manunggal Jaya, Nifasi |
| Nabire | Menou | | Kunupi / Obaipoto, Lokodimi / Bokomidi, Ogiyai (Ogiay / Waisai), Yegeugi (Yageugi) |
| Nabire | Moora | | Arui, Hariti, Kama, Mambor, Moor |
| Nabire | Nabire | | Girimulyo, Kali Bobo (Kalibobo), Kali Harapan, Kalisusu (Kali Susu), Karang Mulia, Karang Tumaritis, Morgo, Nabarua, Oyehe, Sanoba (Sanoba Pantai), Siriwini, Wonorejo (Bumi Wonorejo) |
| Nabire | Nabire Barat | | Bumi Raya, Gerbang Sadu, Kali Semen (Kalisemen), Wadio, Waroki |
| Nabire | Napan | | Masipawa, Napan, Weinami |
| Nabire | Siriwo | | Aibone (Aibore), Epomani, Mabua / Mabou, Tibai, Ugida, Unipa (Siriwo / Unipo) |
| Nabire | Teluk Kimi | | Air Mandidi, Kimi, Lani, Samabusa, Waharia |
| Nabire | Teluk Umar | | Bawei, Goni, Napan Yaur, Yeretuar |
| Nabire | Uwapa | | Argo Mulyo (Argomulyo), Gamei Jaya, Marga Jaya (Margajaya), Topo, Topo Jaya, Urumusu |
| Nabire | Wanggar | | Bumi Mulia (Bumi Mulya / Bumimulia), Karadiri, Wanggar Makmur |
| Nabire | Wapoga | | Kamarisanoi, Keuw, Samanui, Taumi, Totoberi |
| Nabire | Yaro (Yaro Kabisay) | | Bomopai, Jaya Mukti, Ororodo, Parauto, Wanggar Pantai, Wanggar Sari, Wiraska, Yaro Makmur |
| Nabire | Yaur | | Akudiomi (Akuidiomi), Sima, Wami (Wamijaya), Yaur |
| Paniai | Aradide | | Abatadi, Agapo, Baguwo, Bodatadi, Dauwagu, Dinubutu, Duwadide, Emai, Ganiyataka, Ibouwago, Makidini, Tagiya, Toyaimoti |
| Paniai | Aweida | | Akoubaida, Bumaida, Debaiye, Deta, Jomamaida II, Komopa, Tuguwai, Tuwogai Moma, Yabomaida |
| Paniai | Baya Biru | | Bayabiru, Jigitopa Timur, Maatadi, Nomouwodide, Pikokebo, Pupekebo |
| Paniai | Bibida | | Bibida, Dama Dama, Kolaitaka, Kugaisiga, Odiyai, Tuwaktu, Ugidimi |
| Paniai | Bogabaida (Bogobaida) | | Bogobaida, Eyapouda, Jibudide II, Kagoudide, Madou, Miyokepi, Nawipauwo, Obaya Dimi, Yamauwo |
| Paniai | Deiyai Miyo | | Deiyamo, Epouto, Miyamo, Tugu Kagomoma, Tugumo, Uwebutu |
| Paniai | Dogomo | | Bomog Budoga, Danggipa, Dogoma, Odegapa, Sogomo |
| Paniai | Dumadama | | Bomosiga, Dama II, Duma, Japesigaiwaka, Waitapa |
| Paniai | Ekadide | | Baguwo, Dabamomaida (Debamomaida), Debamomaida (Dabamomaida II / Debamomaida II), Geida, Iteuwo, Kenegi, Makidimi, Ogeida, Pasir Putih, Tegougi Pugaida, Teguogi Pugaida II, Widimeida |
| Paniai | Kebo | | Bunaida, Dawawa, Geibu, Ibumaida, Kagupagu, Kebo II, Kedege, Mugimeketago, Oyaiga, Togowa, Tuwamakida, Uwaiye, Yokadagi |
| Paniai | Muye | | Amopa, Bebiyai, Damuto, Epabutu, Idaiyo, Mogoya, Muyetadi, Obaiyodimi, Tiga Damuto, Tinou |
| Paniai | Nakama | | Digiyo Tumataida, Geiketago, Itoka, Kadiyai, Kito, Okaitadi, Uwodege |
| Paniai | Paniai Barat | | Beko, Ekinauwo, Epo Obano, Kadial Digiugi, Kegouda, Kigodide, Obano, Putakogopa, Tipakotu, Totiyo, Tuwouwo, Wiyogei, Woukotopa |
| Paniai | Paniai Timur | | Agumaida, Aikai, Amougibutu, Awabutu, Dapaiba, Enarotali, Geibu, Geko, Ipakiye, Iyaitaka, Kagupago, Kogekotu, Kogetoku (Kogetoku II), Kopo, Madi, Mugimeketago, Oyaigo, Papato, Pudotadi, Timida, Tuamakida, Ugibutu, Wage, Woeyubetu, Yagiyo Butu, Yukekebo |
| Paniai | Pugo Dagi | | Boba, Iyaidagi, Iyaitadi, Kopaidagi, Pugo, Tipago, Uwibutu, Waidede, Walepo |
| Paniai | Siriwo | | Bua / Ikotu, Bugubutu, Dadou / Siriwo, Degatadi, Dogomouto, Eguai, Giwo, Kepi, Nomokepota, Tadia / Ayaikebo, Uwoyupi, Wageme, Wegekebo, Yinotadi |
| Paniai | Teluk Deya | | Biyadide, Okago, Pekege, Totiyo, Ukauwo, Waipa |
| Paniai | Topiyai | | Debakebouda, Ekauwiya, Eyagitaida, Gakokotu, Kaidoutadi, Kegama, Momageida, Obaipugaida, Okonobaida, Pogeidimi |
| Paniai | Wegee Bino | | Boutai, Bubugiwo, Bukaduata, Dagouto, Dei, Kopabutu, Obayaweta, Tamugauwo, Yimouto |
| Paniai | Wegee Muka | | Badawo, Geko, Kinoi, Kobauyagapa, Kugitadi, Muyadebe, Obaidagi, Toko, Uwamani, Woubutu, Yagio Butu |
| Paniai | Yagai | | Awebutu, Datauwo, Ipuwa, Kebo Satu, Muniyepa, Panibagata, Payogei, Pugaida, Woyoutu, Yaibu |
| Paniai | Yatamo | | Dimiya, Keniapa, Memiyaibutu, Udaugi, Wotai |
| Paniai | Youtadi | | Dokoneida, Ipouwa, Munaiyepa, Namutadi, Uwagi, Youtadi |
| Puncak | Agandugume | | Agandugume, Ayume, Dolinggu, Dugunale, Gut'yenggenak, Ogobak'pelenak, Terowi |
| Puncak | Amungkalpia | | Alama, Amungkalpia, Bela, Bemoki, Ompliga, Tagalarama |
| Puncak | Beoga | | Ambobera, Dambet, Dengkibuma, Milawak, Ogamki, Ondugi, Tinggilbet, Yulukoma |
| Puncak | Beoga Barat | | Babe, Jambul, Jenggeren, Kelmabet, Mugulip, Nungai |
| Puncak | Beoga Timur | | Bungok, Gimurik, Kelandiruma, Meningimte, Pilokoma, Puluk, Pupet, Wandibet |
| Puncak | Bina | | Bina, Golu, Kabogoluk, Lumakluk, Mamaput, Ogomegat, Wogot |
| Puncak | Dervos | | Dervos, Duaita, Faisau, Foisa, Fokri, Kordesi, Tayai |
| Puncak | Doufo | | Doufo, Iratoi, Jirei, Lani, Rawa, Sibita, Wahuka |
| Puncak | Erelmakawia | | Ai Arama, Amungkonin, Bomogin, Erelmakawia, Ipmangkop, Kalpamonora, Mamoldema, Tamagun, Wamagun |
| Puncak | Gome | | Agiyome, Gome, Kelanungin, Misimaga, Ninggabuma, Tegelobak, Upaga, Wako, Yenggernok, Yonggolawi |
| Puncak | Gome Utara | | Mundidok, Tobenggi, Towenggi II, Welenggaru, Yaiki Maiki |
| Puncak | Ilaga | | Ilambet, Jenggerpaga, Kago, Kalebut, kibogolome, Kimak, Nipuralome, Tagaloa, Wuloni |
| Puncak | Ilaga Utara | | Akonobak, Amungi, Ayali, Maki, Mayuberi, Mundiba, Olenki, Paluga, Toegi |
| Puncak | Kembru | | Aguit, Belaba, Kembru, Makuma, Molu, Nilime, Tinoti |
| Puncak | Lambewi | | Piluwolu, Pumbanak, Tenawi, Tuput, Wamiru, Wanombut, Wenggen'ambut |
| Puncak | Mabugi | | Bologobak, Bubet, Kabuki, Kalemogom, Ko'eao, Mabuga, Ogongki, Oknanim |
| Puncak | Mage'abume | | Amuleme, Gelegi, Jigunggi, Kondokwe, Kumikomo, Nigilome, Rumagi, Tinibolu, Weni, Winanggwi, Wombru |
| Puncak | Ogamanim | | Daung, Erong Berong, Hikinat, Kombet, Kulamagom, Ogamanin (Ogamanim), Onop |
| Puncak | Omukia | | Aminggaru, Awilkinop, Balamagalama, Domaoa, Eromaga, Gilini, Kuleme, Kunga, Manggume, Ninggibome, Ondugura, Pinapa, Pinggil / Eronggobak, Pungtrama |
| Puncak | Oneri | | Deogi, Gunaluk, Jiwot, Jugumi, Kugiame, Wuyunggame |
| Puncak | Pogoma | | Gagama, Guwamu, Kolamagi, Kumasingga, Pogoma, Ugutmu, Wakme, Wiha, Yugume |
| Puncak | Sinak | | Gigobak, Gigobak II, Gingga Baru, Gulabut, Kalibuk, Kelemame, Kolaribanak, Mogulu, Pasir Putih, Tenonggame, Yauria |
| Puncak | Sinak Barat | | Bakcini, Kilunggame, Komapaga, Tagalame I, Timobut, Timobut Egewak, Wonelupaga |
| Puncak | Wangbe | | Ailpailin, Jindak, Marilaukin, Mongkoihol, Nagaljagama, Nangi, Pungki, Ulipia, Wangbe, Wonalbe, Wungbet |
| Puncak | Yugumuak | | Agenggen, Jerusalem, Lambera, Manggame, Mugalolo, Pamebut, Wilewak, Wiyabubu, Wobulo, Yugumuak |
| Puncak Jaya | Dagai | | Dagai, Dagai Dua, Debite, Deide, Farride, Gueri, Mandara Lani, Mbomban, Soi, Yeihineri (Yeihneri) |
| Puncak Jaya | Dokome | | Dokome, Imulineri, Kimibut, Molobak, Nowome, Nowoneri, Nungwawi, Purbalo, Wurage |
| Puncak Jaya | Fawi | | Bakusi, Biricare, Dorey, Evo, Fawi, Fii, Kaho, Turumo, Yerei |
| Puncak Jaya | Gubume | | Apelome, Ginilume, Gubume, Gubuneri, Jinggi, Kenendaga, Kumigi, Liguni, Melela, Menggegenikime, Milineri, Mondu, Noba Noba, Nogi, Timoramo, Tinggirege, Wunggani |
| Puncak Jaya | Gurage | | Gwenggu, Lulame, Nalime, Pilia, Tiru, Tukwi, Urgele, Yagonik, Yaniruk, Yarmukum, Yogorini |
| Puncak Jaya | Ilamburawi | | Berelema, Ilamburawi, Jigunikime, Kalome, Temu |
| Puncak Jaya | Ilu | | Alukme (Aulukme), Belantara, Dolinggame, Ginipago, Girmor, Gubulome, Juria Satu, Kalengga, Kaninonggo, Kirigimaduk, Kurikpulok, Lambo, Maka, Megawi Megewa, Mobigi, Pindebaga, Pukipaki, Pulau Timur, Pulogengga, Wurak, Wurak (Kelurahan Wurak) |
| Puncak Jaya | Irimuli | | Anggutari, Dondo, Jiginikime, Niruwi, Puncak Senyum, Tanoba, Wondenggobak, Wunagelo, Yalikambi |
| Puncak Jaya | Kalome | | Agape, Berem, Binggelakme, Cilome, Diraluk, Jinggwi, Jiramok, Kalome, Kayogebur, Longgawi, Palumagi, Pilibur, Torage, Wundini, Wurabume, Yanenggawi |
| Puncak Jaya | Kiyage | | Ambo, Amuringgik, Atoli, Kelandu, Kiyage, Tenggabanggwi, Tumbiwolu, Wanggiba |
| Puncak Jaya | Lumo | | Gilibe, Gililome, Kililumo, Lumo, Ninggineri, Tigir, Wuluma, Wurabak, Wuramburu |
| Puncak Jaya | Mewoluk | | Anggolapaga, Balinggup, Biak, Gumbru, Mewoluk, Nggininik, Waliba, Wutikme |
| Puncak Jaya | Molanikime | | Belabaga, Maloinggen, Mewut, Tiolome, Wanume |
| Puncak Jaya | Muara | | Doligobak, Dologobak, Karubate, Kulirik, Muara, Talilome, Yalinggua, Yambidugun |
| Puncak Jaya | Mulia | | Birak Ambut, Muliagambut, Pagaleme, Pepera, Pruleme, Towogi, Trikora, Usir, Wuyukwi, Wuyukwi (Kelurahan Wuyukwi), Wuyuneri |
| Puncak Jaya | Nioga | | Gibaga, Jigonikme, Muruwi, Nioga, Papak, Walom, Wambagalo, Wanduri, Wonggi, Wutime, Yonggi |
| Puncak Jaya | Nume | | Akwibaga, Anebalui, Kering, Mepar, Meyongga, Nume, Onendu, Oum, Pagolome, Tombok, Woraluk, Wurina, Yawor |
| Puncak Jaya | Pagaleme | | Igimbut, Kulok Enggame, Lunggineri, Muliambut, Pagaleme |
| Puncak Jaya | Taganombak | | Abili, Andugir, Ginimanggen, Guna, Laworege, Lugubago, Mandura, Muara Miguni, Pereya, Wumbiri |
| Puncak Jaya | Tingginambut | | Berime, Bigirage, Degi, Gigume, Gimanggen, Gobak, Gubupur, Inikimaluk, Jugumbelawi, Lumbuk, Melekom, Monia, Papua, Paralo, Tingginambut, Tinggineri, Tingginime, Tombo, Uragi, Womelagandan, Yamengga, Yonggun |
| Puncak Jaya | Torere | | Ambok, Asua, Awiyam, Degei, Digi, Gubugani, Gunung Tayok, Kikup, Nalu, Nambu, Sigou, Tubugime, Wariru |
| Puncak Jaya | Waegi | | Agopaga, Ambit-Mbit, Andiron, Anggutare, Aulakme, Ginilome, Jimbinggame, Jiogobak, Lerawera, Mondogoneri, Nakongwe, Oriluk, Pagargom, Tenolok, Tenomanggen, Tirigoi, Towoluk, Wurunikme (Wurungkime), Yalibate |
| Puncak Jaya | Wanwi | | Anggagalo, Anggalo, Anggege, Bime, Bunaluk, Gereja Lama, Gibume, Kiburu, Naburage, Nenegame, Nuwi, Pernaluk, Piyabigimbut, Ponggoname, Wiyage, Wonwi, Yunggwi |
| Puncak Jaya | Yambi | | Dangenpaga, Ginigom, Mondu, Moulo, Tenolok, Tirineri, Wonome, Yambi, Yoboluk |
| Puncak Jaya | Yamo | | Binime, Gibaga, Goyage, Kabilimbut, Kwatineri, Linwakwi, Muara, Nami, Tiogeme, Wolame, Wundu, Yambuni, Yileyale, Yogolawi |
| Puncak Jaya | Yamoneri | | Amberiambut, Bunume, Digolome, Gumawi, Jembeneri, Jibonok, Jigelo, Jiguluk, Jimbanime, Kobarak, Moulo, Ngginigum, Piyapigi, Wugiwagi, Yagaluk, Yamoneri |

== See also ==
- List of districts of West Papua
- List of districts of South Papua
