= Abinomn language =

Endangered language of Indonesia

Abinomn
- Foia
- Baso
- Native to: Indonesia
- Region: Mamberamo Hulu District, Mamberamo Raya Regency, Papua
- Native speakers: 300 (2002)
- Language family: Language isolate

Language codes
- ISO 639-3: bsa
- Glottolog: abin1243
- ELP: Abinomn
- Abinomn language is classified as Critically Endangered by the UNESCO Atlas of the World's Languages in Danger.

The Abinomn language (Avinomen, Foya) is a likely language isolate spoken in Papua province, Indonesia. Abinomn was initially reported by Mark Donohue. It is also known as Avinomen, Baso (deprecated) and Foia. There are about 300 speakers.

== Classification ==
Abinomn is not closely related to any other language, and its closest relatives are unknown. It is generally treated as a language isolate.

== Neighboring languages ==
Although surrounded by Lakes Plain languages, Abinomn highly differs from Lakes Plain. For instance, unlike the nearby Lakes Plain languages, Abinomn is a non-tonal language. Languages adjacent to Abinomn are:

- Papasena (west)
- Diebroud (south; across the Taritatu River)
- Foau (east)
- Berik (north)

== Phonology ==
Consonants:
		Labial	Alveolar	Palatal	Velar	
		Labial	Alveolar	Palatal	plain	labial
Nasal		m	n	ɲ		
Plosive/ Affricate	voiceless	p	t		k	kʷ
Plosive/ Affricate	voiced	b	d	dʒ		ɡʷ
Fricative	voiceless	ɸ	s			
Fricative	voiced	β				
Rhotic			r			
Approximant		w		j		

Vowels:
	Front	Back
High	i	u
Mid	e	o
Low	a	

== Pronouns ==
The Abinomn pronouns are:

singular		dual		plural	
I	mit	we two	mor	we	awp
you (nominative)	ni	you two	por	you	pi
he, she	in, nn	they two	nar	they	kn

== Number inflection ==
Number inflection for selected Abinomn nouns showing suppletive forms, as listed in Foley (2018):

Number inflection for selected Abinomn nouns
gloss	singular	dual	plural
‘armband’	atamatu	atamaturom	atamatukon
‘aunt’	nyebak	nyebakrom	nyebakaigon
‘bamboo knife’	abisiam	abissabrom	abisiasom
‘barbed arrow’	kari	karirom	karigon
‘bandicoot’	aine	ainerom	ainekon
‘calf of leg’	din	dirom	doidi
‘cassowary’	komosin	komosirom	komosidi
‘catfish’	mum	mubrum	mukr
‘centipede’	sm	sbrom	skr
‘cockatoo’	arkon	arkorom	arkoti
‘comb’	isr	isrdom	isrkon
‘drum’	itowa	itowarom	itowakon
‘egg’	ak	akrom	aigon
‘father’s father’	moi	moirom	moigon
‘fireplace’	msm	msbrom	mskr
‘fishing arrow’	den	derom	deti
‘footwear’	tefir	tefidom	tefirkon
‘grasshopper’	saseinakin	saseinakirom	saseinakidi
‘hair’	erk	erkrom	erkigon
‘hand’	akwir	akwidom	akwirkon
‘headband’	kwetam	kwetambrom	kwetakr
‘house’	pr	prdom	prkon
‘jungle’	gwek	gwekrom	gwekigon
‘knife handle’	tam	tabrom	tatom
‘lake’	kesif	kesifrom	kesifkon
‘leech’	piar	piardom	piarkom
‘louse’	jen	jendrom	jeti
‘maleo fowl’	igwuk	igwukrom	igwukigon
‘night’	siwi	siwirom	siwkon
‘owl’	weimn	weimrom	weimti
‘pot’	jek	jekrom	jekigon
‘praying mantis’	tigwere	tigwererom	tigwerekon
‘prawn’	beresmin	beresmindrom	beresmidi
‘river turtle’	fan	farom	fati
‘sago pudding’	midam	midabrom	midatom
‘star’	skin	skirom	skidi
‘stone’	wor	wordom	workon
‘sunbird’	weim	weibrom	weigr
‘swamp’	okwi	okwirom	okwigon
‘thigh’	ker	kedom	kerkon
‘thorn’	doin	doirom	doidi
‘toe’	gwesiam	gwesiabrom	gwesasom
‘tree kangaroo’	we	werom	wekon
‘wallaby’	dk	dkrom	digon
‘water snake’	moi	moirom	moigon
‘younger brother’	ai	airom	akon
