= Tori language =

Tori language may refer to:

- Tɔli language, a variety of the Phla–Pherá languages of West Africa
- Taori language, any of several East Tariku languages of New Guinea, such as Sikaritai or Doutai
