= East Bird's Head–Sentani languages =

Proposed family of Papuan languages

East Bird's Head–Sentani
- Geographic distribution: Papua
- Linguistic classification: Extended West Papuan ?: East Bird's Head–Sentani
- Subdivisions: East Bird's Head; Burmeso; Sentani

Language codes
- ISO 639-3: –
- Glottolog: None

The East Bird's Head–Sentani languages form a family of Papuan languages proposed by Malcolm Ross which combines the East Bird's Head and Sentani families along with the Burmeso language isolate. Sentani had been a branch of Stephen Wurm's proposal for Trans–New Guinea. It has lexical similarities with the Asmat–Kamoro languages, but Ross does not believe these demonstrate a genealogical relationship.

Ross also included the unclassified language Tause, but as a stimulus for investigation rather than as a serious proposal.

The East Bird's Head–Sentani languages, together with the West Papuan languages and the Yawa isolate, form part of a tentative proposal for an Extended West Papuan family. They are distinguished from the West Papuan family in having forms like ba or wa for the second-person singular ("thou") pronoun.

== Classification ==
East Bird's Head–Sentani unifies two groups that Wurm placed at the family level, and one or two isolates.

- - East Bird's Head
    - Mantion (Manikion)
    - Meax: Meax (Meyah), Meninggo (Moskona)
    - ? Saponi
  - Burmeso (Taurap)
  - ? Tause (perhaps two languages, Tause and Weirate)
  - Sentani
    - Demta
    - Sentani proper: Sentani, Nafri, Tabla (Tanah Merah)

Tause is best considered unclassified. Clouse (1997) classified it as a Lakes Plain language, but its pronouns are not a good match. Ross included it here partially to spark further investigation. Saponi shares half of its basic lexical vocabulary with Rasawa, but its pronouns instead resemble those of East Bird's Head.

== Pronouns ==
These families share no common vocabulary, and are linked only by their pronouns. The pronouns Ross reconstructs for proto-families are:

Sentani
	Number		
Person	Singular	Plural	
Person	Singular	exclusive	inclusive
1st	*də	*me	*e
2nd	*wa	?	
3rd	*nə	?	

East Bird's Head
	Number		
Person	Singular	Plural	
Person	Singular	exclusive	inclusive
1st	*da, *di-	*meme, *me-	*mimi, *mi-
2nd	*ba, *bi-	*ia, *i-	
3rd	*e, *-	*rua, *ri-	

Burmeso and Tause correspond in their first and second singular pronouns:

- Burmeso da (de-), ba (be-)
- Tause di, ba

Saponi corresponds in first person and second singular:

- Saponi mamire "I, we", ba "thou".
