= Fayu =

Fayu may refer to:

- Fayu Atoll, also known as East Fayu, an atoll in Chuuk State, Micronesia
- Piagailoe Atoll, also known as West Fayu, an atoll in Yap State, Micronesia
- Fayu people in Western New Guinea
  - Fayu language
- Fayu Temple, one of three major temples in Mount Putuo, Zhejiang province, China
