= Keuw language =

Language in Indonesia

Keuw
- Kehu
- Native to: Papua
- Region: Wapoga River, in the foothills inland from Cenderawasih Bay: Wapoga District, Nabire Regency, Papua province
- Native speakers: 200 (2007)
- Language family: Lakes Plain?: Wapoga; Keuw

Language codes
- ISO 639-3: khh
- Glottolog: kehu1238
- ELP: Kehu

Keuw (Keu, Kehu) is an unclassified language of New Guinea.

Keuw is spoken in a swampy lowland region along the Poronai River in Keuw village (kampung) of Wapoga District, Nabire Regency, Papua province, Indonesia. According to oral folklore, the Keuw were originally from Woisaru, and then moved to Sanawado, which may be locations in Wapoga District.

== Classification ==
Mark Donohue (2007) said that Kehu is "probably a Geelvink Bay language, but no one knows enough about those languages, systematically, to say this with confidence for [any of them] beyond Barapasi, T(ar)unggare and Bauzi."

Timothy Usher (2018) classifies it as a Lakes Plain language, closest to Awera and Rasawa–Saponi. According to Foley, based on some lexical and phonological similarities, Keuw may possibly share a deep relationship with the Lakes Plain languages. Palmer (2018) treats Keuw as a language isolate.

== Phonology ==
Phonology of Keuw from Kamholz (2012), quoted in Foley (2018):

=== Consonants ===
Keuw has ten consonants.

		Labial	Alveolar	Palatal	Velar
Plosive	voiceless	p	t		k
Plosive	voiced	b	d		ɡ
Fricative			s		
Liquid			l		
Semivowel		w		j	

=== Vowels ===
Keuw has five vowels.

	Front	Back
Close	i	u
Mid	e	o
Open	a	

=== Tone ===
Keuw has contrastive tone. Some minimal pairs demonstrating phonemic tonal contrasts:

- áalìyò ‘tongue’, áalíyò ‘house’
- kíilyô ‘possum’, kíilyò ‘arrow’
- úukyò ‘grandfather’, úunyô ‘woman’

== Syntax ==
Keuw has SOV word order, as exemplified by the sentence below. The morphemic suffixes remain unglossed.

kómúul-yò yúmséet-yò núu-nô
boar-? cassava-? eat-?
‘The boar ate the cassava.’

== Basic vocabulary ==
Basic vocabulary of Keuw from Kamholz (2012), quoted in Foley (2018):

Keuw basic vocabulary
gloss	Keuw
‘bird’	páupǝn
‘blood’	kpíi
‘bone’	ntyéns
‘breast’	túulí
‘ear’	téemé
‘eat’	núu
‘egg’	bléemí
‘eye’	mlúul
‘fire’	núup
‘go’	páwì
‘ground’	píi
‘hair’	plíikd
‘head’	kpúunt
‘leg’	páud
‘louse (body)’	máa
‘louse (head)’	bréen
‘man’	méeli
‘moon’	dyúutǝn
‘one’	bíisìp
‘path, road’	ngkéempúkə
‘see’	líyè, tíyè, kúntáb
‘sky’	tpáapí
‘stone’	tóotí
‘sun’	tandən
‘tooth’	mée
‘tree’	kúd
‘two’	páid
‘water’	yél
‘woman’	úun

The following basic vocabulary words are from the Trans-New Guinea database:

gloss	Keuw
head	kpúunt-yô
ear	téemé-yô
eye	mlúul-yô
nose	klókəә̀n-yô
tooth	mée-yô
tongue	áalì-yò
pig	kómúul-yò
egg	bléemí-yò
blood	kpíi-yò
bone	ntyéns-yô
skin	mpáakəә́t-yô
breast	túulí-yò
tree	kúd-yô
sky	tpáapí-yò
sun	táadəә́n-yô
moon	dyúutəә́n-yò
water	yél-yò
fire	núup-yò; óopí-yò
stone	tóotí-yò
road, path	ŋkéempúkəә̀-yô
eat	kéep-yô; núu-nô
one	bíisìp-yò
two	páid-yô
