= Turu people =

Ethnic group in Indonesia

Iau

Total population
- 2,100 (2012)

Regions with significant populations
- Indonesia (Puncak and Puncak Jaya)

Languages
- Iau, Papuan Malay, and Indonesian

Related ethnic groups
- (subgroups: Edopi • Foi • Iau); Kirikiri • Fayu • Duvle • Tause

The Turu people are an ethnic group that inhabits Puncak Regency and Puncak Jaya Regency in the province of Central Papua, Indonesia. They speak the Iau (Turu) language as their mother tongue. In 2012, the population of this ethnic group was 2,100 people.

The Turu people are one of the indigenous people of New Guinea in the La Pago traditional area, along with ethnic groups such as the Dani, Lani, Damal, Nduga, Lem, Wano, and others.

== See also ==
- Ethnic groups in Indonesia
- Indigenous people of New Guinea
- Indonesian Papuans
