= TCQ =

TCQ or tcq may refer to:

- Tagged Command Queuing
- Coronel FAP Carlos Ciriani Santa Rosa International Airport (IATA code : TCQ)
- Kaiy language (ISO 639-3 alpha-3 code : tcq)
