= Upaga =

- Location in Papua and Indonesia Upaga (Indonesia)
- Coordinates: 4°1′10.9974″S 137°42′37.90512″E
- Country: Indonesia
- Province: Central Papua
- Regency: Puncak Regency
- Elevation: 11,910 ft (3,630 m)

Population (2010)
  - Total: 2,289
- Time zone: UTC+9 (Indonesia Eastern Standard Time)

Upaga is a village in Puncak Regency, Central Papua province, Indonesia. It is located at around 4°1′10.9974″S 137°42′37.90512″E, in the elevation of around 3,630 metres. Its population is 2,289

== Climate ==
Although Upaga is located on tropical latitudes, the very high elevation causes its Climate to be classified as Subpolar oceanic (Cfc) with cold temperatures and very heavy rainfall year-round.

Climate data for Upaga
| Month | Jan | Feb | Mar | Apr | May | Jun | Jul | Aug | Sep | Oct | Nov | Dec | Year |
|---|---|---|---|---|---|---|---|---|---|---|---|---|---|
| Mean daily maximum °C (°F) | 16 (61) | 15.9 (60.6) | 15.4 (59.7) | 14.7 (58.5) | 13.8 (56.8) | 12.7 (54.9) | 11.8 (53.2) | 11.8 (53.2) | 13.1 (55.6) | 15 (59) | 15.7 (60.3) | 16 (61) | 14.3 (57.8) |
| Daily mean °C (°F) | 10.0 (50.0) | 10.0 (50.0) | 10.0 (50.0) | 9.5 (49.1) | 9.1 (48.4) | 8.4 (47.1) | 7.8 (46.0) | 7.6 (45.7) | 8.1 (46.6) | 9.2 (48.6) | 9.5 (49.1) | 10.1 (50.2) | 9.1 (48.4) |
| Mean daily minimum °C (°F) | 4.1 (39.4) | 4.2 (39.6) | 4.6 (40.3) | 4.4 (39.9) | 4.4 (39.9) | 4.1 (39.4) | 3.8 (38.8) | 3.4 (38.1) | 3.2 (37.8) | 3.5 (38.3) | 3.4 (38.1) | 4.2 (39.6) | 3.9 (39.1) |
| Average precipitation mm (inches) | 305 (12.0) | 343 (13.5) | 304 (12.0) | 296 (11.7) | 297 (11.7) | 298 (11.7) | 303 (11.9) | 285 (11.2) | 279 (11.0) | 290 (11.4) | 271 (10.7) | 293 (11.5) | 3,564 (140.3) |
Source: Climate-Data.org
