= Fayu people =

Ethnic group in Indonesia

Total population
- 1,470

Regions with significant populations
- Indonesia (Papua & Central Papua)

Languages
- Fayu language, Indonesian language

Religion
- Christianity (65%), other ethnic religion (35%)

Related ethnic groups
- Turu people

The Fayu people are an ethnic group who live in an area of swampland in Waropen Regency, Papua Province and Puncak Regency, Central Papua, Indonesia. They can be found in Kampung Otodemo, Inggerus District, but also in Kampung Dirou, Kampung Kawari, Kampung Dairi and Kampung Subohiri and in Kirihi District (south of Otodemo). When first contacted by westerners they numbered about 400, a number reduced from about 2000 due to violence within the group. The Fayu generally live in single family groups with gatherings of several such groups once or twice a year to exchange brides. Two books have been written about living among them. The first is by Sabine Kuegler, who spent most of her childhood growing up with them. The second is Jared Diamond's Guns, Germs, and Steel, where the group is used as an example of a band type society. The Fayu are often described in books written about them as Stone Age people, cannibalistic, brutal fighters, backward, and as a people who can only count up to three. Today, the Fayu people number up to 1,470; the majority of them are Christians.

== See also ==
- Indigenous people of New Guinea
