= BZU =

BZU may refer to:

- Bahauddin Zakariya University, Multan, Punjab, Pakistan
- Bir Zeit University, West Bank
- bzu, Burmeso ISO 639-3 language code
