= Kiy =

Kiy or KIY can refer to:

- Kilwa Masoko Airport, an airport in Kilwa Masoko, Tanzania
- Kirikiri language, Lakes Plain language of Indonesia
- Kiy Island, an island in Arkhangelsk Oblast, Russia
