= Kirikiri =

Kirikiri may refer to:

- Kirikiri language, a Lakes Plain language
- Kirikiri Maximum Security Prison, a Nigerian maximum security prison
- Kirikiri Station, a railway station in Japan
- KiriKiri, a visual novel engine
- Kirikiri, a South Korean lesbian organization
