= Biritai language =

Language

Biritai
- Aliki
- Native to: Indonesia
- Region: Biri village in East Central Mambermano District, Mamberamo Raya Regency, Papua
- Native speakers: (250 cited 1988)
- Language family: Lakes Plain: Central; Biritai

Language codes
- ISO 639-3: bqq
- Glottolog: biri1259
- ELP: Biritai

Biritai (Biri) is a Lakes Plain language of Papua, Indonesia. It is named after Biri village in East Central Mambermano District, Mamberamo Raya Regency.

== Phonology ==
The following inventory is taken from Donohue (2017), with a very small consonant inventory typical of the Lakes Plain languages.

=== Consonants ===
		Labial	Coronal
Stop	voiceless		t
Stop	voiced	b	d
Fricative		ɸ	s

In an earlier paper co-authored by Donohue, the approximants /j w/ are also included as phonemes. The authors note that Biritai is typologically unusual for missing series of velar, nasal and liquid consonants.

=== Vowels ===
	Front	Back	
	Front	unrounded	rounded
Close	i	ɯ	u
Close-mid	e		
Open-mid	ɛ		ɔ
Open	a		

=== Tone ===
Biritai is tonal.
