= Kwenukweltimarogai =

- Location in Western New Guinea and Indonesia Kwenukweltimarogai (Indonesia)
- Coordinates: 3°46′50.106″S 138°17′22.5384″E
- Country: Indonesia
- Province: Central Papua
- Regency: Puncak Jaya Regency
- District: Jigonikme District
- Elevation: 12,152 ft (3,704 m)

Population (2010)
  - Total: 503
- Time zone: UTC+9 (Indonesia Eastern Standard Time)

Kwenukweltimarogai is a village in Jigonikme district, Puncak Jaya Regency in Central Papua province, Indonesia. Its population is 503.

== Climate ==
Kwenukweltimarogai has a wet alpine tundra climate (ET) with heavy rainfall year-round.

Climate data for Kwenukweltimarogai
Month	Jan	Feb	Mar	Apr	May	Jun	Jul	Aug	Sep	Oct	Nov	Dec	Year
Mean daily maximum °C (°F)	15.5 (59.9)	15.5 (59.9)	14.9 (58.8)	14.3 (57.7)	13.4 (56.1)	12.4 (54.3)	11.5 (52.7)	11.5 (52.7)	12.8 (55.0)	14.7 (58.5)	15.2 (59.4)	15.4 (59.7)	13.9 (57.1)
Daily mean °C (°F)	9.4 (48.9)	9.6 (49.3)	9.4 (48.9)	9.1 (48.4)	8.6 (47.5)	7.9 (46.2)	7.3 (45.1)	7.2 (45.0)	7.7 (45.9)	8.8 (47.8)	8.9 (48.0)	9.4 (48.9)	8.6 (47.5)
Mean daily minimum °C (°F)	3.4 (38.1)	3.7 (38.7)	4.0 (39.2)	3.9 (39.0)	3.8 (38.8)	3.5 (38.3)	3.2 (37.8)	2.9 (37.2)	2.7 (36.9)	2.9 (37.2)	2.7 (36.9)	3.5 (38.3)	3.4 (38.0)
Average precipitation mm (inches)	317 (12.5)	342 (13.5)	317 (12.5)	300 (11.8)	298 (11.7)	296 (11.7)	303 (11.9)	285 (11.2)	279 (11.0)	303 (11.9)	280 (11.0)	306 (12.0)	3,626 (142.7)
Source: Climate-Data.org
