= Kai language =

Kai language may be

- Kaiy language
- Kei language (Keiese)
- Kâte language
