= Duvle language =

Language of Papua, Indonesia

Duvle
- Native to: Indonesia
- Region: Dagai village in Dagai District, Puncak Jaya Regency, Papua
- Native speakers: (930 cited 2000)
- Language family: Lakes Plain: Duvle–East; Duvle

Language codes
- ISO 639-3: duv
- Glottolog: duvl1242

Duvle (Sikwari) is a Lakes Plain language of the Papua, Indonesia. It is spoken in Dagai village in Dagai District, Puncak Jaya Regency.

Variant spellings are Duvde, Duve, Duvele, Duvre. It is also known as Wiri.

A Duvle-based pidgin is used with speakers of Wano as well.

Duvle-Wano Pidgin
- Native speakers: None
- Language family: Duvle-based pidgin

Language codes
- ISO 639-3: None (mis)
- Glottolog: duvl1238
