= Iau language =

Lakes Plain language of West Papua, Indonesia

Iau
- Edopi, Turu
- Native to: Indonesia
- Region: Western New Guinea
- Ethnicity: Turu (Iau)
- Native speakers: (2,100 cited 2000–2012)
- Language family: Lakes Plain: Tariku; Iau
- Dialects: Foi; Turu; Iau; Edopi

Language codes
- ISO 639-3: Either: tmu – Iau dbf – Edopi
- Glottolog: iauu1242

Iau (Iaw, Yau) or Turu is a Lakes Plain language of West Papua, Indonesia, spoken by about 2,100 people, native speakers of this language are the Turu people (Iau). Most speakers are monolingual, and their number is growing. Other peoples in the western Lakes Plain area speak basic Iau. Iau is heavily tonal, with 11 tones on nouns and 19 simple and compound tones on verbs.

== Names and dialects ==
Dialects are Foi (Poi), Turu, Edopi (Elopi), and Iau proper; these may be distinct enough to be considered separate languages. Foi is spoken on the large Tariku River (Rouffaer River), Turu on the Van Daalen River, Iau proper between the rivers, and Edopi at the juncture of the Tariku and Kliki (Fou) rivers.

Another name for the language is Urundi ~ Ururi. Dosobou (Dou, Doufou) is specifically Edopi.

In Puncak Jaya Regency, Iau dialects are spoken in Bakusi, Duita, Fawi, and Fi villages, located between the Rouffaer River and Van Daalen River in Fawi District.

== Phonology ==
The following discussion is based on Bateman (1990a).

=== Consonants ===
		Bilabial	Coronal	Velar
Occlusive	voiceless		t ⟨t⟩	k ⟨k⟩
Occlusive	voiced	b ⟨b⟩	d ⟨d⟩	
Fricative		f ⟨f⟩	s ⟨s⟩	

- /t k/ are tenuis.
- /t d/ are dental while /s/ is alveolar.
- /b d/ are implosive [ɓ, ɗ], and may be realized as nasals [m, n] in free variation before /a/.
  - /d/ may also be realized as an approximant [l] before /a/.
- /f/ has four allophones:
  - [ɸ ~ h] word-initially, or optionally as [x] before /i, i̝/.
    - [ɸ] is preferred in the Foi dialect while [h] is preferred in the Turu dialect.
  - [h] word-medially.
  - [p̚] word-finally.
    - /f/ is the only consonant that can occur word-finally, and occurs only in a limited number of words.

=== Vowels ===
The following monophthongs and diphthongs exist:

	Front	Central	Back
Fricated	i̝ ⟨i⟩		
Close	i ⟨i⟩		u ⟨u⟩
Near-close	ɪ ⟨y⟩		ʊ ⟨v⟩
Open-mid	ɛ ⟨e⟩		ɔ ⟨o⟩
Open	ɛ ⟨e⟩	a ⟨a⟩	

	ɛ	ɪ	ʊ	i	u	i̝
a	aɛ	aɪ	aʊ	ai	au	ai̝
ɛ				ɛi		
ɔ	ɔɛ			ɔi		
ʊ		ʊɪ				
u				ui		

- /i̝/ is realized as [ij]. It is less frequent than the other vowels.
- /ɛ/ is realized as [ɛ ~ æ] in free variation.
- /a/ is always nasalized [ã], except as a component of a diphthong.
- There are two triphthongs /aui, aʊɪ/, where /u, ʊ/ are realized as unrounded [ɯ, ɯ̽].

=== Syllables ===
Syllables consist minimally of a vowel. They may include a single onset consonant and/or a single coda consonant. Diphthongs and triphthongs are attested. The template is (C)(V)V(V)(C). The tone-bearing unit is the syllable.

=== Stress ===
Stress in Iau is predictable: it falls on the final syllable of disyllabic words. (Words may not be longer than two syllables.) The interaction between stress and tone is not clear.

=== Tone ===
Iau is the most tonally complex Lakes Plain language. Unlike other Lakes Plain languages which can be disyllabic or trisyllabic, Iau word structure is predominantly monosyllabic. Iau has eight phonemic tones, transcribed by Bateman using numerical tone numbers (with 1 high and 5 low, as in much of Africa and America but the opposite of the convention used with Asian languages): two level tones (low and high), two rising tones (low rising and high rising), three falling tones (high-low, high-mid, and mid-low), and one falling-rising tone. Phonetically, these are:

- high 2 [˦]
- mid 3 [˧]
- high rising 21 [˦˥]
- low rising 43 [˨˧]
- high–low falling 24 [˦˨]
- high–mid falling 23 [˦˧]
- mid–low falling 34 [˧˨]
- falling–rising 243 [˦˨˧]

A sequence of two tones (called a tone cluster) may occur on one syllable. There are eleven tone clusters that can occur on verbs to mark aspect; only three of these can occur on nouns.

Some minimal sets in Iau illustrating phonemic tonal contrasts:

- be˦ 'father-in-law'
- be˧ 'fire'
- be˦˥ 'snake'
- be˨˧ 'path'
- be˦˨ 'thorn'
- be˦˧ 'flower'
- be˧˨ 'small eel'
- be˦˨˧ 'tree fern'
- te˦ 'pigsty'
- te˧ 'mosquito'
- te˦˥ 'man'
- te˨˧ 'edible tuber'
- te˦˨ 'calf of leg'
- te˦˧ 'inlet of body of water'
- te˧˨ 'flooring'

Examples of monosyllabic words with the three 'compound' tones are /da˧˦˧/ 'mountain', /oi˦˥˧/ 'hand' and /sae˨˧˦˧/ 'knife'.

There is downdrift after low (3) and falling tones, and also of (24) following (243). A high-rising (21) tone rises slightly after another.

Tone is lexical on nouns, pronouns, numerals, prepositions and other parts of speech, but verbs are unmarked for tone. In verbs, each tone represents a different aspect or aktionsart. The complex system of aspectual marking via tone is discussed in Bateman (1986).

==== Aspect ====
Iau also displays complex tonal verb morphology. Verbal roots do not have any inherent tone, but tone is used to mark aspect on verbs. Example paradigms:

Tone	Aspect	ba 'come'	tai 'moving s.t. toward'	da 'locate s.t. inside'
tone 2	totality of action, punctual	ba˦ 'came'	tai˦ 'pulled'	da˦ 'ate, put it in (stomach)'
tone 3	resultative durative	ba˧ 'has come'	tai˧ 'has been pulled off'	da˧ 'has been loaded onto s.t.'
tone 21	totality of action, incomplete	ba˦˥ 'might come'	tai˦˥ 'might pull'	
tone 43	resultative punctual	ba˨˧ 'came to get'	tai˨˧ 'land on s.t.'	da˨˧ 'dip into water, wash s.t.'
tone 24	telic punctual	ba˦˨ 'came to end'	tai˦˨ 'fell to ground'	da˦˨ 'eaten it all up'
tone 23	telic, incomplete	ba˦˧ 'still coming'	tai˦˧ 'still falling'	da˦˧ 'still eating it up'
tone 34	totality of action, durative	ba˧˨ 'be coming'	tai˧˨ 'be pulling'	
tone 243	telic durative	ba˦˨˧ 'sticking to'	tai˦˨˧ 'be falling'	
tone 21+34			tai˦˥˧˨ 'pull on s.t., shake hands'	
tone 21+3			tai˦˥˧ 'have pulled s.t., shook hands'	
tone 3+21	had finally			

==== Mood ====
Tonal alternations can also serve as final mood and speech act particles.

- tone 2: speaker assumes the information is correct (such as rhetorical questions)
- tone 34: speaker asks a question to confirm what they believe to be true (such as yes–no questions)
- tone 23: speaker is uncertain about the actual state of affairs

Example sentences:

a˦˧ ty˦˥ bi˦˥e˦ a˦˥se˦ u˨˧ di˦ be˦?
father people PN SEQ before kill.TOTAL.PUNCT Q.FACT
'So the people from Bie killed father first?'

fv˦˥ ba˦˥ ba˧˨?
canoe come.TOTAL.INCOMPL Q.CONFIRM
'Is the plane coming?'

da˦ a˦˨˧ tv˦ be˦˧?
2.PL land travel.TOTAL.PUNCT Q.GUESS
'(I'm guessing) did you (pl) go by land?'

== Orthography ==
According to the Iau - English Dictionary, the following orthography is employed:

Phoneme
a	b	d	ɛ	f	i	i̝	k	ɔ	s	t	u	ʊ	ɪ
Grapheme
a	b	d	e	f	i		k	o	s	t	u	v	y

9	˦	be9 'father-in-law'
8	˧	be8 'fire'
7	˦˥	be7 'belt'
6	˨˧	be6 'path'
5	˦˨	be5 'fish trap'
4	˦˧	be4 'flower'
3	˧˨	be3 'eel'
2	˦˨˧	be2 'tree fern'

== Bibliography ==
- Bateman, Janet (1982). "The topic-comment construction in Iau". In Kana, Marit (ed.). Workpapers in Indonesian linguistics. Vol. 1. Irian Jaya, Indonesia: Universitas Cenderawasih. pp. 28–49.
- Bateman, Janet (1986). "Iau verb morphology" (PDF). NUSA: Linguistic Studies of Indonesian and Other Languages in Indonesia. 26. Jakarta: Universitas Katolik Atma Jaya: 1–76.
- Bateman, Janet (1990a). "Iau segmental and tone phonology" (PDF). NUSA: Linguistic Studies of Indonesian and Other Languages in Indonesia. 32: 29–42.
- Bateman, Janet (1990b). "Pragmatic functions of the tone morphemes on illocutionary force particles in Iau". NUSA: Linguistic Studies of Indonesian and Other Languages in Indonesia. 32: 1–28.
- Edmondson, A.; Bateman, Janet; Miehle, Helen (1992). "Tone contours and tone clusters in Iau". Proceedings of the Annual Meeting of the Berkeley Linguistics Society: Special Session on the Typology of Tone Languages. Vol. 18. Berkeley, CA: Berkeley Linguistics Society. pp. 92–103. doi:10.3765/bls.v18i2.1544.
