= Sikaritai language =

Lakes Plain language spoken in Indonesia

Sikaritai
- Tori Aikwakai
- Native to: Indonesia
- Region: Sikari village in Rufaer District, Mamberamo Raya Regency, Papua
- Native speakers: 2,000 (2015)
- Language family: Lakes Plain: Central; Sikaritai

Language codes
- ISO 639-3: tty
- Glottolog: sika1263

Sikaritai (Sikwari) is a Lakes Plain language of Papua, Indonesia. It is named after Sikari village in Rufaer District, Mamberamo Raya Regency. Alternate names are Aikwakai, Araikurioko, Ati, Tori, Tori Aikwakai.

It is spoken in Haya, Eri, and Sikari villages.

Sikaritai, Obokuitai, and Eritai constitute a dialect cluster.

== Phonology ==
The following discussion is based on Martin (1991).

=== Consonants ===
	Labial	Coronal	Velar
Plosive	b	t d	k kʷ
Fricative	ɸ	s	
Semivowel	w		

This small consonant inventory is typical of Lakes Plain languages. The complete lack of nasals is also a feature of these languages.

There are however several notable allophonic variants:

- /d/ is realized as [d ~ l] word-initially, [ɾ ~ l] between vowels or following another consonants, and as [d̚] syllable-finally.
- /k/ is realized as [g̚] syllable-finally. When followed by a vowel, the sequence /ik/ is realized as a syllabic fricative [ɣ̩]. The sequence /iko/ further varies with [u.o].
- [ɸ] is in free variation with a glottal fricative [h].
- /s/ is realized as [ʃ] following /k/.
- /i/ before another vowel is realized as either a semivowel [j] or an affricate [dʒ] (the latter when following /k/ or when between two low vowels (/ɛ/ or /a/).

=== Vowels ===
Sikaritai has six vowels.

	Front	Central	Back
High	i		u
Mid-high	e		
Mid	ɛ		o
Low		a	

Many other Lakes Plain languages have developed a series of extra high "fricativized" vowels from the loss of a final consonant. In Sikaritai the final consonants have been retained; however, extra-high [i] and [u] appear as allophones of /i/ and /u/ before final /k/ and /d/. Martin postulates that Sikaritai is in the process of developing contrastive fricativized vowels as other Lakes Plain languages have done.

=== Tone ===
The language has a two-height tone system with H and L tone. More than one tonal element can appear on a single syllable.

=== Syllables ===
The syllable template is (C)(C)V(V)(C).
