= Waritai language =

Language

Wari
- Waritai
- Native to: Indonesia
- Region: Western New Guinea
- Native speakers: (150 cited 2000)
- Language family: Lakes Plain: Central; Doutai–Waritai?; Wari

Language codes
- ISO 639-3: wbe
- Glottolog: wari1264
- ELP: Waritai

Waritai is a Lakes Plain language of Irian Jaya, Indonesia. It is spoken in Taiyeve.
