= Eritai language =

Lakes Plain language of Irian Jaya, Indonesia

Eritai
- Baburiwa
- Aliki
- Native to: Indonesia
- Region: Eri village in East Central Mambermano District, Mamberamo Raya Regency, Papua
- Native speakers: (530 cited 2000)
- Language family: Lakes Plain: Central; Obokuitai–Eritai; Eritai

Language codes
- ISO 639-3: ert
- Glottolog: erit1239

Eritai (Eri), or Baburiwa, is a Lakes Plain language of Irian Jaya, Indonesia. It is named after Eri village in East Central Mambermano District, Mamberamo Raya Regency.

It is spoken in Eri, Haya, and Kustera villages.

Sikaritai, Obokuitai, and Eritai constitute a dialect cluster.
