= Abawiri =

Lakes Plain language native to Indonesia

- Doa
- Abawiri
- Native to: Indonesia
- Region: Western New Guinea
- Native speakers: 350 (2010)
- Language family: Lakes Plain: East Lakes Plain; Abawiri

Language codes
- ISO 639-3: flh
- Glottolog: foau1240
- ELP: Foau

The Abawiri language is a Lakes Plain language of Papua, Indonesia. It is spoken in the village of Fuau, located along the Dijai River, a tributary to the Mamberamo River. Clouse tentatively included Abawiri and neighboring Taburta (Taworta) in an East Lakes Plain subgroup of the Lakes Plain family; due to the minimal data that was available on the languages at that time. With more data, the connection looks more secure.

Like other Lakes Plain languages, Abawiri is notable for being heavily tonal and for lacking nasal consonants: there are no nasal or nasalized consonants or vowels, even allophonically.

== Phonology ==
Abawiri has sixteen obstruent consonants (eight plain and eight labialized), as well as one sonorant consonant /ɾ/. The consonant and vowel charts below show the phonemes, followed by their representations in the community orthography (in brackets) where that representation is different from the phoneme symbol.

Abawiri consonants
		Labial		Alveolar		Alveolo-palatal		Velar	
		plain	rounded	plain	rounded	plain	rounded	plain	rounded
Plosive	voiceless			t	tʷ ⟨tw⟩			k	kʷ ⟨kw⟩
Plosive	voiced	b	bʷ ⟨bw⟩	d	dʷ ⟨dw⟩	dʒ ⟨j⟩	dʒʷ ⟨jw⟩	g	gʷ ⟨gw⟩
Fricative		f	fʷ ⟨fw⟩	s	sʷ ⟨sw⟩				
Flap				ɾ ⟨r⟩					

Abawiri has seven vowels, including three high front vowels: /i/, /y/, and /i̝/.

Abawiri vowels
	Front	Back
Extra-high	i̝ ⟨yi⟩	
High	i y ⟨yu⟩	u
Mid	ɛ ⟨e⟩	
Low	a	ɒ ⟨o⟩
