= Burmeso language =

Papuan language

Burmeso
- Taurap
- Region: Papua: Mamberamo Raya Regency, Mamberamo Tengah subdistrict, Burmeso village on the banks of the Middle Mamberamo River
- Native speakers: (250 cited 1998)
- Language family: West Papuan or language isolate: (extended) East Bird's Head; Burmeso

Language codes
- ISO 639-3: bzu
- Glottolog: burm1264
- ELP: Burmeso

The Burmeso language, also known as Taurap (from the word tauraf meaning 'language'), is a language spoken by some 300 people in Burmeso village along the mid Mamberamo River in Mamberamo Tengah subdistrict, Mamberamo Raya Regency, Papua province, Indonesia. It is surrounded by the Kwerba languages to the north, the Lakes Plain languages to the south, and the East Cenderawasih Bay languages to the west.

Burmeso forms a branch of Malcolm Ross's family of East Bird's Head – Sentani languages, but had been considered a language isolate by Stephen Wurm and William A. Foley. The language has very distinct grammatical structure. It has SOV word order.

== Phonology ==
Consonants:
		Labial	Alveolar	Palatal	Velar	Glottal
Nasal		m	n			
Plosive	voiceless		t		k	
Plosive	voiced	b	d	ʤ	ɡ	
Fricative	plain	ɸ	s			h
Fricative	labial					hʷ
Liquid			r			
Semivowel		w		j		

Probable sound changes proposed by Foley (2018):

- *p > /ɸ/
- *tʃ > /s/

Vowels:
	Front	Back
Close	i	u
Mid	e	o
Open	a	

== Pronouns ==
Burmeso independent pronouns are:

	sg	du	pl
1	da	day	boro
2	ba		bito

== Nouns ==
Burmeso has six noun classes, which are:

class	semantic category
1	male humans and associated things (contains half of all nouns)
2	female humans and associated things
3	body parts, insects, and lizards; material culture like axes and canoes, some foods; many natural phenomena
4	mass nouns
5	the two staple foods: sago tree and banana
6	arrows, coconuts, and rice (traded items)

Burmeso nouns have three genders: masculine, feminine, and neuter. Singular concordial suffixes are:

- -ab ‘masculine’
- -an ‘feminine’
- -ora ‘neuter’

Examples of nominal concordial suffixes in usage:

koya bek-ab
grandfather good-M.SG
‘Grandfather is good.’

asia ek-an
grandmother good-F.SG
‘Grandmother is good.’

== Basic vocabulary ==
Basic vocabulary of Burmeso (singular and plural nominal forms) listed in Foley (2018):

Burmeso basic vocabulary
gloss	singular	plural
‘bird’	tahabo	tohwodo
‘blood’	sar	sarido
‘bone’	hiwraf	himaruro
‘breast’	mom	momut
‘ear’	ara	
‘eat’	bomo	
‘egg’	kahup	kohuro
‘eye’	anar	anuro
‘fire’	hor	horemir
‘give’	i ~ o	
‘hair’	ihna	ihiro
‘leg’	ago	agoro
‘louse’	hati	
‘man’	tamo	dit
‘name’	ahau	
‘one’	neisano	
‘see’	ihi	
‘stone’	ako	hiruro
‘sun’	misiabo	misiado
‘tooth’	arawar	araruro
‘tree’	haman	hememido
‘water’	baw	bagaruro
‘woman’	nawak	nudo

Many Burmeso nouns display irregular and suppletive plural forms.

gloss	singular	plural
‘man’	tamo	dit
‘banana’	mibo	mirar
‘dog’	jamo	juwdo
‘pig’	sibo	sirudo
‘white cockatoo’	ayab	ayot
‘house’	konor	konodo
‘mat’	wira	wirasamir

The following basic vocabulary words are from Voorhoeve (1975), as cited in the Trans-New Guinea database:

gloss	Burmeso
head	agum
hair	ihiro
eye	jenar
tooth	araruro
leg	jago
louse	hati
dog	jamo
pig	sibo
bird	tohodo
egg	kohũp
blood	sar
bone	hiurap
skin	asi memiro
tree	haman
man	tamo
sun	misiavo
water	bau
fire	hor
stone	ako
name	ahau
eat	bomo
one	neisano
two	sor
