= Woria language =

Endangered Papuan language of Indonesia

Woria
- Region: Indonesian Papua
- Native speakers: (5 cited 2000)
- Language family: East Geelvink Bay?: Woria

Language codes
- ISO 639-3: wor
- Glottolog: wori1246
- ELP: Woria
- Woria is classified as Critically Endangered by the UNESCO; Atlas of the World's Languages in Danger.

- Location within Western New Guinea
- Coordinates: 2.37997°S 136.519°E

Woria is a nearly extinct Papuan language of the Indonesian province of Papua, on the eastern shore of Cenderawasih Bay. It is spoken in Botawa village, Waropen Regency, where the Lakes Plain language Saponi was also spoken.

Woria is lexically similar to the East Geelvink Bay languages and presumably belongs in that family, but is too poorly attested to be sure.
