= Kwerisa language =

Endangered Lakes Plain language of Indonesia

Kwerisa
- Taogwe
- Native to: Indonesia
- Region: New Guinea
- Ethnicity: 130
- Native speakers: (15 cited 2000)
- Language family: Lakes Plain: Central; Kwerisa

Language codes
- ISO 639-3: kkb
- Glottolog: kwer1264
- ELP: Kwerisa
- Kwerisa language is classified as Critically Endangered by the UNESCO Atlas of the World's Languages in Danger.

Kwerisa, or Taogwe, is a nearly extinct Lakes Plain language of Irian Jaya, Indonesia. Most of the Kwerisa people have shifted to Kaiy, which is closely related.

They mostly inhabit Kai I village, the original location of the village. While most Torweja (Toarikei) people moved to the new village of Kai II (or Bakaije) located on the banks of Oi River and the new Rufaer district capital location (the new Kai village location) upstream from Akru River.
