= Obokuitai language =

Language

Obokuitai
- Aliki
- Native to: Indonesia
- Region: Obogoi village in East Central Mambermano District, Mamberamo Raya Regency, Papua
- Native speakers: (120 cited 2000)
- Language family: Lakes Plain: Central; Obokuitai–Eritai; Obokuitai

Language codes
- ISO 639-3: afz
- Glottolog: obok1239
- ELP: Obokuitai

Obokuitai (Obogwitai) is a Lakes Plain language of Papua, Indonesia. It is named after Obogoi village in East Central Mamberamo District, Mamberamo Raya Regency.

Obokuitai, Sikaritai, and Eritai constitute a dialect cluster.

== Phonology ==
The following data is sourced from Jenison & Jenison (1991).

Unusual phonological features of Obokuitai and other Lakes Plain languages are the complete lack of nasals, even allophones, and a series of extra high or fricativized vowels that developed from loss of a following stop consonant. Obokuitai has one of the smallest phonemic inventories in the world, equal to the Pirahã and Rotokas languages at 11 phonemes.

=== Consonants ===
Obokuitai has a relatively small consonant inventory typical of Lakes Plain languages:

		Bilabial	Alveolar	Velar	Glottal
Plosive	voiceless		t	k	
Plosive	voiced	b	d		
Fricative			s		h

- /t, b/ have no observed allophones.
- Only /k/ occurs in syllable coda. It has the following allophones:
  - [g̚] syllable-finally after [ɨ], e.g. /sik/ [sɨg̚] 'boat';
  - [b̚] syllable-finally after [u], e.g. /huk/ [hub̚] 'fat';
  - [g] syllable-initially after /k/, e.g. /tik.kuɛi/ [tɨg̚.gʷɛi] 'lizard';
  - [k] syllable-initially elsewhere, e.g. /ku/ [ku] 'cassowary'.
- /d/ has the following allophones:
  - [ɾ] intervocalically or as the second member of a syllable-initial cluster, e.g. /kdɛ.do/ [kɾɛ.ɾo] 'millipede';
  - [d] elsewhere, e.g. /ik.di/ [ɨg̚.di] 'kind of tree'.
- /s/ has the following allophones:
  - [ʃ] after [ai, ɛi] and before [o], e.g. /tɛi.so.ko/ [tɛi.ʃo.ko] 'girl';
  - [ts] after [aɨg̚, ɛɨg̚], e.g. /ɛik.sɛ.huk/ [ɛɨg̚.tsɛ.hub̚] 'garden';
  - [s] elsewhere, e.g. /so/ [so] 'sun or moon'.
- /h/ has the following allophones:
  - [ɸ] in the cluster /hd/ [ɸɾ ~ hɾ], e.g. /hda/ [ɸɾa ~ hɾa] 'soil';
  - [h] elsewhere, e.g. /ha/ [ha] 'kind of insect'.

=== Vowels ===
Obokuitai has a cross-linguistically average 5-vowel inventory:

	Front	Central	Back
Close	i		u
Mid	ɛ		o
Open		a	

- /ɛ/ is open-mid while /o/ is close-mid.
- /a, ɛ, o/ have no observed allophones.
- /i/ has the following allophones:
  - [j ~ dʒ] after /k/, e.g. /hɛik.ia/ [hɛɨg̚.ja ~ hɛɨg̚.dʒa] 'crocodile';
  - [ɨ] before [g̚], e.g. /ik/ [ɨg̚] 'domestic pig';
  - [i] elsewhere, e.g. /i/ [i] 'I'.
- /u/ has the following allophones:
  - [ʷ] in open syllables after /k/ and before [ɾ] or unrounded vowels, e.g. /ku.dɛ/ [kʷɾɛ] 'fire';
  - [u] elsewhere, e.g. /u/ [u] 'mosquito'.

=== Tone ===
Like the other Lakes Plain languages, Obokuitai is tonal. L, H, and HL pitch contours occur on monosyllabic words. A phonological analysis of the tone system remains to be completed. However, the probable phonemic aspect of the tone is shown through the minimal triad kuik^{1} 'rock', kuik^{2} 'insect' (sp.) and kuik^{12} 'lizard' (sp.).

== Pronouns ==
Possessive pronouns in Obokuitai are:

	sg	pl
1	i ba	èdo
2	do	deo
3	o	

== Verbs ==
Obokuitai has three verbal prefixes, which are:

- ha-: reciprocal
- ke-: causative
- be-: applicative

Some examples of verbs with the prefixes, as compared to the verb roots without them:

didde → ke-didde
run {} send

kúdde → be-kúdde
talk {} {talk to someone}

tokoidde → be-tokoidde
throw {} {throw directly at something}

kdidde → be-kdidde
pull {} {pinch and pull back a bowstring with tautness}

tdaid → be-tdaid
{cut with a machete} {} {poke, stab, inject}

There are two aspectual verbal suffixes:

- -kua: imperfective
- -di ~ -ei ~ Ø: perfective

These also have "background" forms, used with what Foley refers to as "backgrounded collateral clauses".

- -hoíd: imperfective
- -hi: perfective

== Particles ==
Final particles in Obokuitai:

- ke: exclamatory
- ia: certainty
- te ~ toi: imperative
- bi: yes-no interrogative
- se: information interrogative
- beid: negative
