= Papasena language =

Lakes Plain language spoken in Indonesia

Papasena
- Native to: Indonesia
- Region: Western New Guinea
- Native speakers: (400 cited 1982)
- Language family: Lakes Plain: Central; Papasena

Language codes
- ISO 639-3: pas
- Glottolog: papa1269

Papasena is a Lakes Plain language of Irian Jaya, Indonesia. Ethnologue reports a 23% lexical similarity with Sikaritai, another East Tariku language.
