= Awera language =

Lakes Plain language of Indonesia

Awera
- Native to: Indonesia
- Region: Awera village in Wapoga District, Waropen Regency, Papua
- Native speakers: (70 cited 2000)
- Language family: Lakes Plain: Wapoga; Awera

Language codes
- ISO 639-3: awr
- Glottolog: awer1241
- ELP: Awera

Awera is a Lakes Plain language of Papua, Indonesia. It is spoken on the east side of Geelvink Bay, in the single village of Awera in Wapoga District, Waropen Regency, Papua. The village has a majority of Ansus (Austronesian) speakers.
