= Rasawa language =

Papuan language

Rasawa
- Region: Rasawa village in Oudate District, Waropen Regency, Papua, Indonesia
- Native speakers: (200 cited 1987)
- Language family: Lakes Plain: Wapoga; Rasawa–Saponi ?; Rasawa

Language codes
- ISO 639-3: rac
- Glottolog: rasa1243
- ELP: Rasawa

Rasawa is a Papuan language of Indonesia. It is spoken in Rasawa village in Oudate District, Waropen Regency.

Rasawa shares half of its basic vocabulary with the Saponi language.
