= Tause language =

Papuan language of Indonesia

Tause
- Native to: Indonesia
- Region: Papua, Central Papua (minority)
- Native speakers: 500 (2018)
- Language family: Lakes Plain: West; Tause
- Dialects: Deirate; Nuclear Tause; Weirate

Language codes
- ISO 639-3: tad
- Glottolog: taus1252
- ELP: Tause
- Tause language distribution in Central Papua and Papua

Tause, also known as Doa or Darha, is a poorly-known Papuan language of Indonesia spoken by approximately 500 people, mainly in Derapos village.

The Tause only made contact with the outside world in 1982.

The Tause language has been widely reported to be related to the neighboring Lakes Plain languages; however, this conclusion is based on little evidence. Ross (2005) placed Tause in his East Bird's Head – Sentani family, along with another language isolate and two small families, but this was motivated more by an attempt to spark further research than an actual claim of relationship. Usher (2018) classifies it as the most divergent of the West Lakes Plain languages.
