= Saponi language =

Extinct Papuan language of Indonesia

Saponi
- Native to: Indonesia
- Region: Western New Guinea
- Native speakers: (4 cited 2000)
- Language family: unclassified (lexically Lakes Plain, grammatically East Bird's Head)

Language codes
- ISO 639-3: spi
- Glottolog: sapo1254
- ELP: Saponi
- Coordinates: 2.50°S 139.50°E

Saponi is an extinct Papuan language of Indonesia.

It was spoken in Botawa village of Waropen Bawah Subdistrict in Waropen Regency. Woria is also spoken in Botawa village.

It shared half of its basic vocabulary with Rasawa language, but it is not clear that they were related. Saponi shared none of its pronouns with the Lakes Plain family that Rasawa is part of; indeed its basic pronouns mamire "I, we" and ba "thou" are reminiscent of proto–East Bird's Head *meme "we" and *ba "thou".
