= Mamberamo Raya Regency =

Regency in Papua, Indonesia

Mamberamo Raya Regency Kabupaten Mamberamo Raya
- Regency
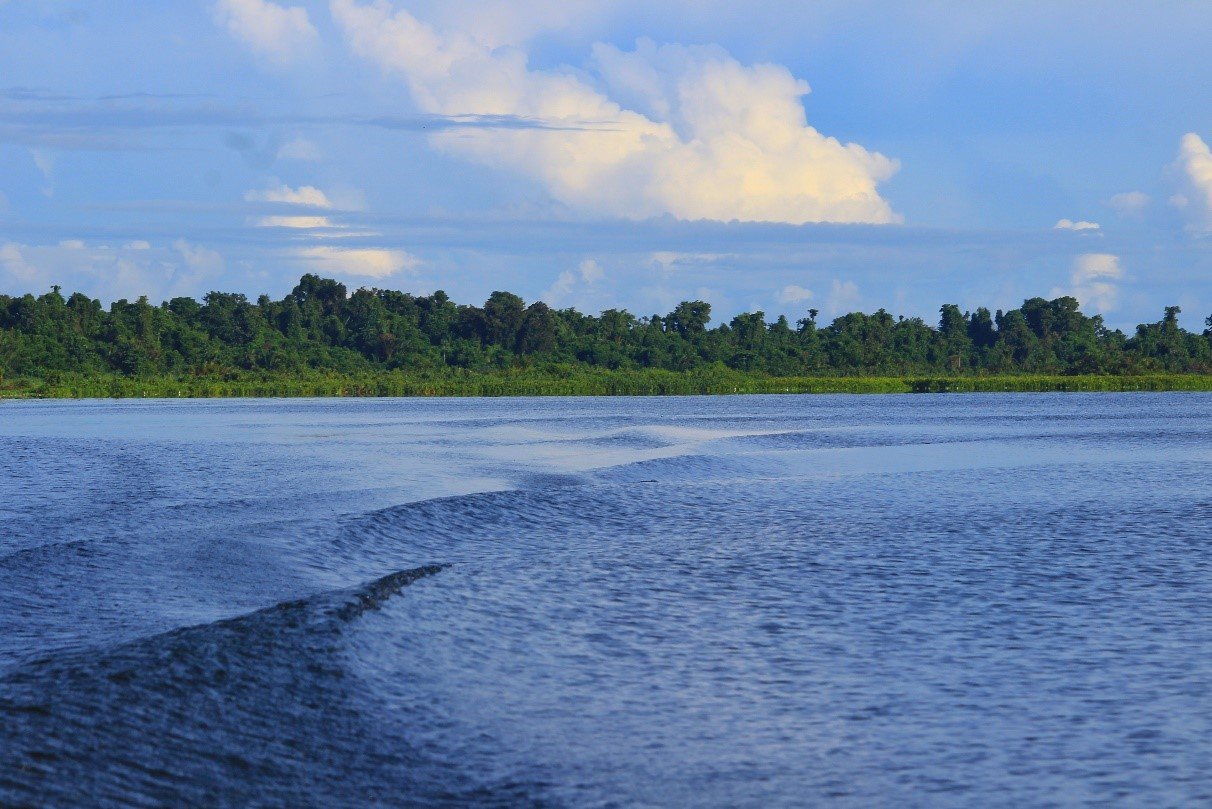
- Lake Rombebai

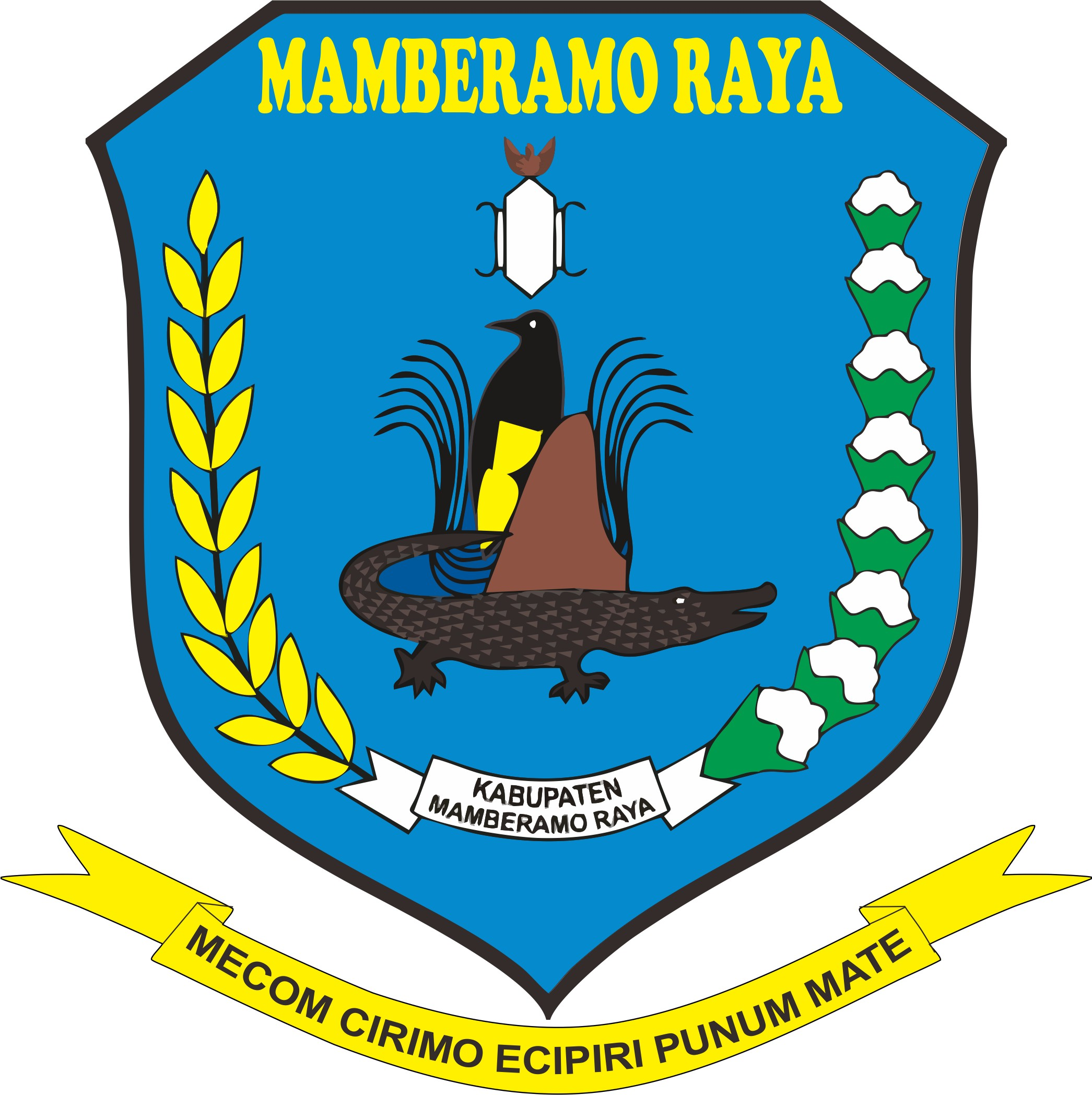
- Coat of arms
- Motto: Mecom Cirimo Ecipiri Punum Mate
- Location in Papua Province

- Location in Indonesian Papua Location in Indonesia
- Coordinates: 2.2356°S 137.7823°E
- Country: Indonesia
- Province: Papua
- Capital: Burmeso

Government
  - Regent: Robby Wilson Rumansara
  - Vice Regent: Keven Totouw

Area
  - Total: 23,813.91 km^{2} (9,194.60 sq mi)
- Highest elevation: 2,200 m (7,200 ft)

Population (mid 2024 estimate)
  - Total: 39,390
  - Density: 1.654/km^{2} (4.284/sq mi)
- Time zone: UTC+9 (Indonesia Eastern Time)
- Area code: (+62) 969
- Website: mamberamorayakab.go.id

Mamberamo Raya Regency or Greater Mamberamo Regency is one of the regencies (kabupaten) in Papua Province, Indonesia. Tt was created on 15 March 2007 from parts of Sarmi Regency and Waropen Regency. The regency gets its name from the Mamberamo River. The largest regency by land in Papua province, It covers an area of 23,813.91 km^{2}, but had a population of only 18,365 at the 2010 Census which had almost doubled to 36,483 at the 2020 Census; the official estimate as of mid-2024 was 39,390 (up from 37,616 in mid 2022). The administrative centre is at the town of Burmeso in Mamberamo Tengah (Central Mamberamo District).

== Geography ==
Mamberamo Raya is bordered to the south by Central Papua Province (Puncak Papua Regency and Puncak Jaya Regency) and Highland Papua Province (Tolikara Regency and Central Mamberamo Regency). Mamberamo Raya is bordered by Sarmi Regency to the east and Waropen Regency to the west. The Yapen Islands Regency in the Cenderawasih Bay lies to the northwest.

The confluence of the Tariku River and Taritatu River is found south of the Gauttier Range. The highest elevation in this regency is near the summit of the Gauttier Mountain Range, at ~2,200 m above sea level; the actual summit of the Gauttier Mountains lies in Sarmi Regency.

== Languages ==
Languages spoken in Mamberamo Raya Regency:

- Lakes Plain languages
- Burmeso language
- Lower Mamberamo languages
- East Geelvink Bay languages

== Subdivisions ==
At the 2010 Census the regency comprised eight districts (distrik), tabulated below with their areas and their populations at the 2010 Census and the 2020 Census, together with the official estimates as of mid-2022. The table also includes the locations of the district administrative centres, the number of administrative villages (kampung) in each district, and its post code. A ninth district (Iwaso, with its district centre at Metaweja) has recently been created, but no figures for its area or 2010 population are available.

Kode Wilayah	District (distrik)	Area in km^{2}	Pop'n 2010 census	Pop'n 2020 census	Pop'n mid 2022 estimate	Admin centre	No. of villages	Post code
91.20.06	Waropen Atas	2,935	2,876	5,413	5,447	Barapasi	7	98681
91.20.07	Benuki	2,636	1,183	2,425	2,495	Gesa Baru	8	98683
91.20.08	Sawai ^{(a)}	3,183	2,346	3,883	3,989	Poiwai	6	98682
91.20.05	Mamberamo Hilir (Lower Mamberamo)	2,078	1,734	3,330	3,387	Trimuris	7	98691
91.20.01	Mamberamo Tengah ^{(b)} (Central Mamberamo)	2,491	3,158	8,037	8,740	Kasonaweja	11	98692
91.20.09	Iwaso	^{(c)}	^{(c)}	541	553	Metaweja	^{(c)}	98692
91.20.04	Mamberamo Tengah Timur (East Central Mamberamo)	2,429	1,551	2,940	2,980	Kustra	7	98693
91.20.03	Rufaer	3,514	2,546	4,909	4,992	Kai (Kay Seta)	6	98695
91.20.02	Mamberamo Hulu (Upper Mamberamo)	4,548	2,971	5,002	5,033	Dabra	8	98694
	Totals	23,814	18,365	36,483	37,616	Burmeso	60	

Note: (a) includes the offshore islands of Pulau Kumkum and Pulau Poiwai. (b) Mamberamo Tengah District listed here should not be confused with Mamberamo Tengah Regency (now part of the province of Highland Papua), which lies to the southeast of Mamberamo Raya Regency. (c) the area and 2010 Population of the new Iwaso District, and the number of villages in the district, are included in the figures for Mamberamo Tengah District, from which it was cut out.
