= Doutai language =

Language

Doutai
- Taori-So
- Native to: Indonesia
- Region: Western New Guinea
- Ethnicity: 340 (1993)
- Native speakers: (70 cited 2000)
- Language family: Lakes Plain: Central; Doutai–Waritai?; Doutai

Language codes
- ISO 639-3: tds
- Glottolog: dout1240
- ELP: Doutai

Doutai (Taori, Tolitai) is a Lakes Plain language of Irian Jaya, Indonesia. It is spoken in Toli-Dou village, located southwest of Taiyeve town.

== Phonology ==
Doutai, like Kirikiri, has the fricativized high vowels iʼ and uʼ. There are 7 vowels in all :

iʼ	uʼ
i	u
e	o
a	
