= Kirikiri language =

Lakes Plain language of Irian Jaya, Indonesia

Kirikiri
- Faia
- Native to: Indonesia
- Region: Doufo District, Puncak Regency, Papua
- Native speakers: (250 cited 1982)
- Language family: Lakes Plain: Tariku; Kirikiri

Language codes
- ISO 639-3: kiy
- Glottolog: kiri1256
- ELP: Kirikiri

Kirikiri (Kirira), or Faia (after its two dialects), is a Lakes Plain language of Irian Jaya, Indonesia. It is spoken in Dofu Wahuka and Paniai villages.

== Phonology ==
Kirikiri does not have many consonant phonemes, but there are many consonant allophones:

| | | Labial | Coronal | Velar |
|---|---|---|---|---|
| Stop/Fricative | voiceless | | t [t ~ d] | k [k ~ g ~ x ~ ɣ] |
| Stop/Fricative | voiced | b [b ~ m ~ ᵐb ~ β] | d [d ~ n ~ ⁿd ~ l ~ ɾ] | |
| Obstruent | | ɸ [ɸ ~ p ~ β ~ h] <f> | s [s ~ ʃ ~ z ~ ʒ] | |

Kirikiri, like Doutai, has the fricativized high vowels iʼ and uʼ. There are 7 vowels:

| | Front | Back |
|---|---|---|
| Fricated | iʼ <i> | uʼ <y> |
| Close | i <ɨ> | u |
| Mid | e | o |
| Open | a | |

Other sources analyse the vowel phonemes differently. One analysis published by SIL Global describes the fricativized high vowels as /i/ and /u/, analyze the close vowels as /e/ and /o/, and transcribes the mid vowels as /ɛ/ and /ɔ/.

A set of two vowels at the same tone will diphthonize, but a set of two vowels with different tones will not. Instances of /u/ between vowels or between /k/ and a vowel are realized as [w].

Kirikiri has four tones: low, high, falling, and rising. The low tone is marked V̀, the high tone is marked V́, the falling tone is marked V́V̀, and the rising tone is marked V̀V́. The syllable structure is (C)(C)V, but some speakers pronounce CCV syllables as CəCV.

== Orthography ==
Kirikiri does not have a universally accepted orthography, but SIL Global has created one.

=== Letter-to-sound correspondances (consonants) ===
| Letter | Context | IPA |
|---|---|---|
| f | word initially and word medially between vowels | freely fluctuates between [ɸ], [h], and [f] |
| f | intervocalically | fluctuates between [β] and [ħ] |
| t | word initially | [t] |
| t | before a phonetic flap and intervocalically | [d] |
| k | word initially and word medially between vowels | [k] |
| k | between voiced segments | fluctuates between [g] and [ɣ] |
| k | between vowels | [x] |
| b | word initially before other phonemes and word medially between vowels | [b] |
| b | intervocalically | fluctuates between [β] and [w] |
| b | before [a] | fluctuates between [m] and [ᵐb] |
| d | word initially | fluctuates between [d], [n], and [ⁿd] |
| d | word medially | fluctuates between [l] and [ɾ] |
| s | word initially and word medially between vowels | [s] |
| s | intervocalically before other vowels | fluctuates between [s] and [z] |
| s | intervocalically before [iʼ] | fluctuates between [ʃ] and [ʒ] |
