= Fayu language =

Language

Fayu
- Native to: Indonesia
- Region: Papua
- Ethnicity: Fayu
- Native speakers: 1,400 (2012)
- Language family: Lakes Plain: Tariku; Fayu

Language codes
- ISO 639-3: fau
- Glottolog: fayu1238
- ELP: Fayu
- Fayu is classified as Vulnerable by the UNESCO Atlas of the World's Languages in Danger

Fayu, also known as Sehudate, is a Lakes Plain language of Papua Province, Indonesia spoken by about 1,400 Fayu people. It is spoken in Foida and other nearby villages.

== Phonology ==
Fayu has a relatively minimal phonological index, typical of Lakes Plain languages. It has an extensive system of allomorphy.

Vowels
	Front	Central	Back
Close	i		u
Mid	ɛ		o
Open		a	

Consonants
	Bilabial	Alveolar	Palatal	Velar	Glottal
Stop	b	t d		k	
Fricative	ɸ	s			h
Affricate			d͡ʑ		
Flap		h͡ɾ			
Approximant	w		j		
