= Taworta language =

Language in Highland Papua

Taworta
- Diebroud, Taborta
- Native to: Indonesia
- Region: Highland Papua
- Native speakers: 300 (2006)
- Language family: Lakes Plain: East Lakes Plain; Taworta

Language codes
- ISO 639-3: tbp
- Glottolog: tawo1244
- ELP: Taworta

Taworta, or Diebroud (also Dabra, Bok, Taria), is a Lakes Plain language spoken in Central Mamberamo, Highland Papua, Indonesia.
