= Kaiy language =

Language of Papua, Indonesia

Kaiy
- Native to: Indonesia
- Region: Rufaer District, Mamberamo Raya Regency, Papua
- Native speakers: (220 cited 2000)
- Language family: Lakes Plain: Central; Kaiy

Language codes
- ISO 639-3: tcq
- Glottolog: kaiy1239
- ELP: Kaiy

Kaiy (Kai, Taori-Kei, Torweja) is a Lakes Plain language of Papua, Indonesia. It is spoken in Kai and Kokou villages in Rufaer District, Mamberamo Raya Regency.

Taorikei/Torweja are the original inhabitants of Kai I village, the original location of the village. Due to perpetual flooding, most moved to the new village of Kai II (or Bakaije), located on the banks of the Oi River, Haya Village in Mamberamo Hulu District, and the new Rufaer district capital location (the new Kai village) upstream from the Akru River.
