= Lakes Plain languages =

Papuan language family

Lakes Plain
- Geographic distribution: Lakes Plains, New Guinea
- Linguistic classification: one of the world's primary language families
- Subdivisions: East Lakes Plain; Tariku; West Lakes Plain

Language codes
- Glottolog: lake1255

The Lakes Plain languages are a family of Papuan languages, spoken in the Lakes Plain of Indonesian New Guinea. They are notable for being heavily tonal and for their lack of nasal consonants.

== Classification ==
The Lakes Plain languages were tentatively grouped by Stephen Wurm with the Tor languages in his Trans–New Guinea proposal. Clouse (1997) rejected this connection to the Tor languages and grouped them with the Geelvink Bay languages. Malcolm Ross classifies the languages as an independent family, a position confirmed by Timothy Usher.

Because of the apparent phonological similarities and sharing of stable basic words such as ‘louse’, William A. Foley speculates the potential likelihood of a distant relationship shared between the Skou and Lakes Plain families, but no formal proposals linking the two families have been made due to insufficient evidence. Additionally according to Foley, based on some lexical and phonological similarities, the Keuw language (currently unclassified) may also possibly share a deep relationship with the Lakes Plain languages.

Like the East Cenderawasih Bay, Trans-New Guinea, and South Bougainville language families, Lakes Plain languages have ergative case marking systems. In contrast, most languages of northern Papua New Guinea have accusative case marking systems.

=== Clouse (1997) ===
Clouse (1997, p. 155) internally classifies the Lakes Plain family as:

- Lakes Plain superstock
  - Rasawa stock
    - Rasawa-Saponi family: Rasawa, Saponi
    - Awera
  - Tariku stock
    - Tause family: Tause, Weirate, Deirate
    - West Tariku family
      - Fayu: Fayu, Sehudate
      - Kirikiri: Kirikiri, Faia
    - Central Tariku family
      - Edopi
      - Turu: Iau, Foi, Turu
    - East Tariku family: Doutai, Waritai, Kai, Biritai, Obokuitai, Eritai, Sikaritai, Kwerisa, Papasena
    - Duvle
    - East Lakes Plain family: Foau (Abawiri), Taworta, Dabra

Clouse concludes that the East Geelvink Bay languages are the most closely related to the Lakes Plain languages, forming a wider Geelvink Bay phylum with it.

=== Usher (2018) ===
The Lakes Plain languages as classified by Usher are as follows:

- Lakes Plains
  - Wapoga River
    - Awera
    - Kehu (Keuw)
    - Rombak River: Rasawa, Saponi
  - West
    - Tause
    - Tariku River
      - Edopi–Iau–Foi–Turu [a dialect cluster]
      - Fayu
      - Kirikiri
  - Central
    Sikaritai, Eritai, Papasena
  - Duvle–East
    - Duvle
    - East Lakes Plain: Foau (Abawiri), Taworta (Diebroud)

Not included in the above classification, Kaiy, Kwerisa, Doutai and Waritai are presumably also Central Lakes Plain; the same for Obokuitai and Biritai. Clouse had placed them closest to Papasena and to Eritai, respectively, and they might form dialect clusters with those languages.

There are particular questions about the inclusion of Saponi, Kehu and Tause.

== Pronouns ==
The pronouns Ross reconstructs for proto-Tariku are:

I	*a/*i	we	*a/*ai
thou	*de	you	*da
s/he	*au	they	?

The corresponding "I" and "thou" pronouns are proto–East Lake Plain *a, *do, Awera yai, nai (the latter from *dai; compare also e "we"), and Rasawa e-, de-. Saponi shares no pronouns with the Lakes Plain family; indeed its pronouns mamire "I, we" and ba "thou" are remenincent of proto–East Bird's Head *meme "we" and *ba "thou". However, Saponi shares half its basic lexical vocabulary with Rasawa, and Ross left it in the Lakes Plain family pending further investigation. The Tause language was also previously grouped amongst the Tariku group of Lakes Plain languages. Ross transferred it to the East Bird's Head – Sentani languages on the basis of pronoun similarities in hopes that this would promote further research.

Below are pronouns in selected Lakes Plain languages as given by Foley (2018):

Lakes Plain pronouns
	Awera	Kirikiri	Iau	Duvle	Obokuitai	Diebroud
1S	yai	a	a	æ	i	aː
2S	dai	de	di	do	di	daː
1P	e	e	e	a	ai	iː

== Phonology ==
Lakes Plain languages have remarkably small phonemic inventories, rivaling even those of Polynesian languages.

=== Consonants ===
Clouse and Clouse (1993) note many of the Lakes Plain languages share several unusual phonological features. While Papuan languages typically have at least two nasal phonemes, this is not the case for Lakes Plain languages. Although phonetic nasals do exist in most Lakes Plain languages, they do not contrast with the corresponding voiced stops. Doutai, Sikaritai, Obokuitai and Abawiri (Foau) lack even phonetic nasals. Additionally, no Lakes Plain language has a liquid phoneme. Clouse (1997) reconstructs a typologically remarkable consonant inventory for the ancestor of Lakes Plain, consisting entirely of only five stops:

		Labial	Coronal	Dorsal
Plosive	voiceless	*p	*t	*k
Plosive	voiced	*b	*d	
Semivowel		*(w)		*(y)

- Because of limited data, the existence of a tap phoneme *ɾ separate from *d is inconclusive.

This results in Lakes Plain languages having high functional load, meaning that there are many words with small distinctions in sounds.

=== Vowels ===
Many of the languages have very high constricted (fricativised) vowels; in Doutai and Kirikiri these constitute separate phonemes from /i/ and /u/. The fricativised vowels seem to have developed from deletion of a following consonant.

Clouse (1997) reconstructs a five-vowel system for proto–Lakes Plain, not unlike Japanese or Spanish:

	Front	Central	Back
Close	*i		*u
Mid	*e		*o
Open		*a	

- In most modern Lakes Plain languages, *e, *o are realized as open-mid [ɛ, ɔ].

=== Tone ===
Lakes Plain languages are all tonal. (The Skou languages and Kainantu-Goroka languages are other Papuan languages possessing contrastive tone.) Clouse and Clouse (1993) reconstruct tone (high level "H" and low level "L") in proto-Lakes Plain.

Duvle and Sikaritai have only two tones, high and low, but all other Lakes Plain languages have more than two tones. All West Tariku languages have both rising and falling tones. Abawiri (Foau) has phonological high and low tones as well as a derived mid tone.

Iau is the most tonally complex Lakes Plain language. Unlike other Lakes Plain languages which can be disyllabic or trisyllabic, Iau word structure is predominantly monosyllabic. Iau has eight phonemic tones, transcribed by Bateman using numerical Chao tones (usually used with East Asian languages): high (44), mid (33), high-rising (45), low-rising (23), high-to-low-falling (42), high-to-mid-falling (43), mid-to-low-falling (32), and falling-rising (423). Four of the eight Iau tones occur on short vowels, while the remaining four occur on long vowels and often correspond to disyllabic words in other Lakes Plain languages. (See Iau language#Tone.)

== Morphology ==
Unlike most Papuan languages to the east, words in Lakes Plain languages do not have gender. Bauzi, an East Geelvink Bay language spoken to the northwest of the Lakes Plain family, also does not have gender. Most Lakes Plain languages are primarily analytic and isolating, with little morphology. However, there is some variation in the family. Iau is almost exclusively analytic and isolating, while Abawiri has extensive verbal morphology.

== Lexical reconstruction ==
Clouse (1997) reconstructs basic vocabulary for proto-Lakes Plain and other lower branches.

Lakes Plain reconstructions by Clouse (1997)

gloss	proto-Lakes Plain	proto-Far West Lakes Plain	proto-Tariku	proto-West Tariku	proto-Central Tariku	proto-East Tariku
neck	*kukro	*roko	*kokro	*kokrV		*kro
mouth	*kukadi/u	*koru	*kuari	*kuari	*ba	*kua
tooth	*bri	*biri	*bri	*bri	*biri	*bri
eye	*kudatiCV	*ura	*kurati	*kurati		*kuratiC
nose		*boru	*boru			*boru
hair/fur	*kru/i		*kru/i	*kru		*kru/i
fingernail	*pV	*bV	*pV	*ɸV	*ɸo	*pe
skin	*ɸidi	*bi	*ɸiri	*ɸire	*iri	*bari
meat	*tV	*tV	*tV	*tV	*ta	*tV
bone		*be	*kai	*kai	*i	*ai
breast	*touCV	*tou	*touC	*tou^	*touC	*touC
stomach	*kuria	*wia	*kuria	*kuri		*kuia
leg		*tu	*Ca	*Ca	*ta	*a
foot			*to	*to		*to
water	*deida	*deire	*dida	*dida	*ida	*wadi
fire	*kudaide	*tairo	*kure	*kue	*be	*kure
adjectival suffix	*-we/-die	*-we/-de	*-we/-die	*-we	*-be	*-die
stone	*kuipade	*pare	*kuiɸae	*kuiɸae	*kuiɸa	*kuip
one		*kri	*keiki			*keiki
three	*didi	*dri	*Cidi	*Cido		*tidi
land	*pra/i	*pri	*pra	*ɸra		*pra
path	*kuadi	*arV	*kuari	*kuari	*ba	*kuai
wide		*wara				
rain	*kurire	*kuie	*kuri	*kuri	*bi	
dull	*baCu	*paupe	*baCu	*baCu	*ba	
sun	*tio		*tio	*tio	*so	*so
moon		*bari				
banana	*kriCV	*kiri	*kriC	*kri^	*kiri	*kriC
tree	*kuCV	*ku	*kuC	*u	*u	*kuC
split		*pekeka				
thorn	*kude	*pore	*kure	*kure	*be	*kure
seed		*weto		*kaba	*ɸe	*aCi
black	*kVCa	*kuara	*kVC	*kaCa		*kiC
bird	*du		*du	*du	*du	*du
wing	*auCo	*uko	*auCu	*auro	*apu	*akau
cassowary	*diadi	*kiri	*diari	*diari	*diari	
a fly	*kubadi	*poiti	*kubari	*kuari	*bari	*kuari
mosquito	*tide	*tre	*tire	*tire	*tire	*tire
dog	*tabi	*kaCo	*tabi	*tiabi	*dabi	*dabi
tail	*tiCa		*tiCa	*tiCa	*tia	*tiC
fish	*tie	*te	*tie	*tie		*te
leech	*kibV	*kiba	*kibi	*ki	*ki	*kibi
louse	*pri	*piri	*pri	*ɸri		*pri
long		*pobi	*kure	*kure	*be	*kuri
house	*kuadV	*aru	*kuarV	*kua	*urV	*kuari
near	*paipai	*paia	*aiɸai			*aiɸai
person	*tau	*du	*tai	*te	*te	*tai
bad		*kaibe	*ɸVra	*ɸe		*ɸura
child	*tau-bri	*tu-ri	*tau-bri	*tau-bri	*tau-	*tau-bi
2SG	*de	*de	*de	*de	*di	*de
1PL	*ai	*e	*ai	*ai	*e	*ai
3SG		*kibV		*be	*o	*de
go/walk	*kidia	*dao	*kidia	*kidia	*dia	
hear-STAT	*kuedi-kuda	*beri-kura	*kueri-kua	*beri-kua	*beri-wa	*kueri-kua
search		*paka				
suck	*tau	*tu	*tau	*taua		*betu
vomit	*kadudu	*aru	*karudu	*ku	*u	*krudu
scrape	*kiCi	*kibie	*kiri	*kiri	*iri	*bekiri
sit	*ɸuɸu	*kua	*ɸuɸu	*ɸoko	*bau	*buhu
stand	*dia-dau	*tarau	*dia-da	*dia-da		
grab	*tiadado	*suarau	*araro	*araro	*da	*do
blow	*pudV	*purV	*purV	*ɸura	*ɸoi	*bu-ɸuru
cough	*takadV	*takari	*takurV	*takuro	*taurai	*takura
firewood	*bodi		*bori	*bo	*bori	
feces	*pade		*pare	*ɸa	*ɸa	*pare
urine	*tiCi		*tiCi	*ti^	*tii	*tiCi
penis	*tiuCV		*tiuC	*tiu^	*tiu	*tuC
scrotum	*kudiCV		*kuriC	*kui^		*kuiC
chin	*kuaukadi		*kuaukari	*kuaukai	*baukai	*kuaukari
ant	*keCV		*keC	*ke	*e	*kiC
arrow	*poka		*poka	*ɸoka	*ɸoka	*poka

== Basic vocabulary ==
Basic vocabulary of the Lakes Plain languages (Rasawa, Kirikiri, Iau, Duvle, Obokuitai, Diebroud) listed in Foley (2018). The sets are not necessarily cognate.

Lakes Plain basic vocabulary
gloss	Rasawa	Kirikiri	Iau	Duvle	Obokuitai	Diebroud
‘bird’	beβo	du	dusi	fura	du	duː
‘blood’	uːyo	klu	oe	sæire	saig	ai die
‘bone’	weβi	kiʼ	iʼ	kæ-ri-a	-baig	butːu
‘breast’	tu	tu	tui	do	toub	tow
‘ear’	u-ra	ke	e	ovei	-kwei	ebre
‘eat’	ki-βaβo	sa	sa	dɪa	da-	beya
‘egg’	uβa	dute	bi	ævisa	ako	ko
‘eye	ɔra	kla	ɸæ	gari	-u	ruːg
‘fire’	tayo	kwɛ	be	bo	kwɛ	do
‘give’	paro	tu	baɛ	bou	behig	bei
‘go’	uɣuβe	kia	i	da/dou	do-	dug
‘ground’	gi	ɸla	a	pɪa	hra	faː
‘hair’	u-kha	ta-kruʼ	iʼ-su	tæri	hoig	teri
‘hear’	puaβo	beika	bi-bae	bou/bæiɪ	kwɛri	atega
‘leg’	u-ru	ɸa	tai	fria	-hig	aigwa
‘louse’	piye	ɸli	i(bo)	pri	hri	fi(god)
‘man’	duβu	te	te	oirɛ	ta	gutːi
‘moon’	bariya	tɔ	baiʼdaki	vrisa	so	fere
‘name’	uβa	kwa	ɔsu	oiɛ	asukwa	faya
‘one’	kri-βi	suo-we	bisi-be	soɣo-ɛ	kore-kekaig	kwaka
‘path, road’	we	kwari	bɛ	ioɣoia	kuɛi	eigre
‘see’	paβo	ɸua/ɸori	dɔɛ	fei/fou	badub	fǝkta
‘stone’	pa	ɸai	ɸeki	pæxi	kwig	gwid
‘sun’	kuri	tɔ	baiʼ	væir	so	gwadi
‘tongue’	isɔːkɔ	abla	ae	zæri	-rija	iri
‘tooth’	ɔ	uri	biʼ	æbidi	-brig	adːi
‘tree’	ukui	du	u	ura	kub	gru
‘two’	wɔri	ɔro-we	bɔ	tɛʔɛ	tio	tai
‘water’	de(ye)	da	e	dæ/dɛ	-rig	dye
‘woman’	kuru	ko	si	oruæi	tub	ro

== See also ==
- List of districts of Papua for a list of districts and villages with respective languages

== Bibliography ==
- Clouse, Duane A. (1997). Karl Franklin (ed.). "Towards a reconstruction and reclassification of the Lakes Plain languages of Irian Jaya". Papers in New Guinea Linguistics. 2: 133–236. ISSN 0078-9135. OCLC 2729642.
- Clouse, Heljä; Duane A. Clouse (1993). "Kirikiri and the western Lakes Plain languages: selected phonological phenomena". Language and Linguistics in Melanesia. 24: 1–18. OCLC 9188672.
- Ross, Malcolm (2005). "Pronouns as a preliminary diagnostic for grouping Papuan languages". In Andrew Pawley; Robert Attenborough; Robin Hide; Jack Golson (eds.). Papuan pasts: cultural, linguistic and biological histories of Papuan-speaking peoples. Canberra: Pacific Linguistics. pp. 15–66. doi:10.15144/PL-572. ISBN 0858835622. OCLC 67292782.
- Silzer, Peter; Heljä Heikkinen (1991). Index of Irian Jaya languages (Second ed.). Jayapura: University Cenderawasih and Summer Institute of Linguistics. OCLC 26368341.
