= Puncak Jaya Regency =

Regency in Central Papua, Indonesia

Puncak Jaya Regency Kabupaten Puncak Jaya
- Regency
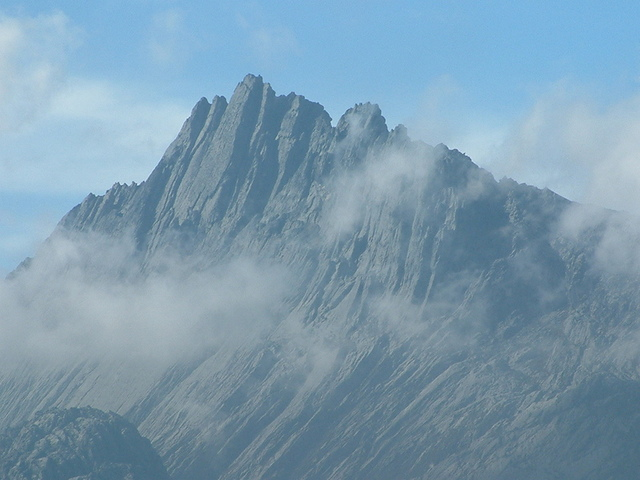
- A view of the peak of Puncak Jaya, located in the southwestern portion of the regency

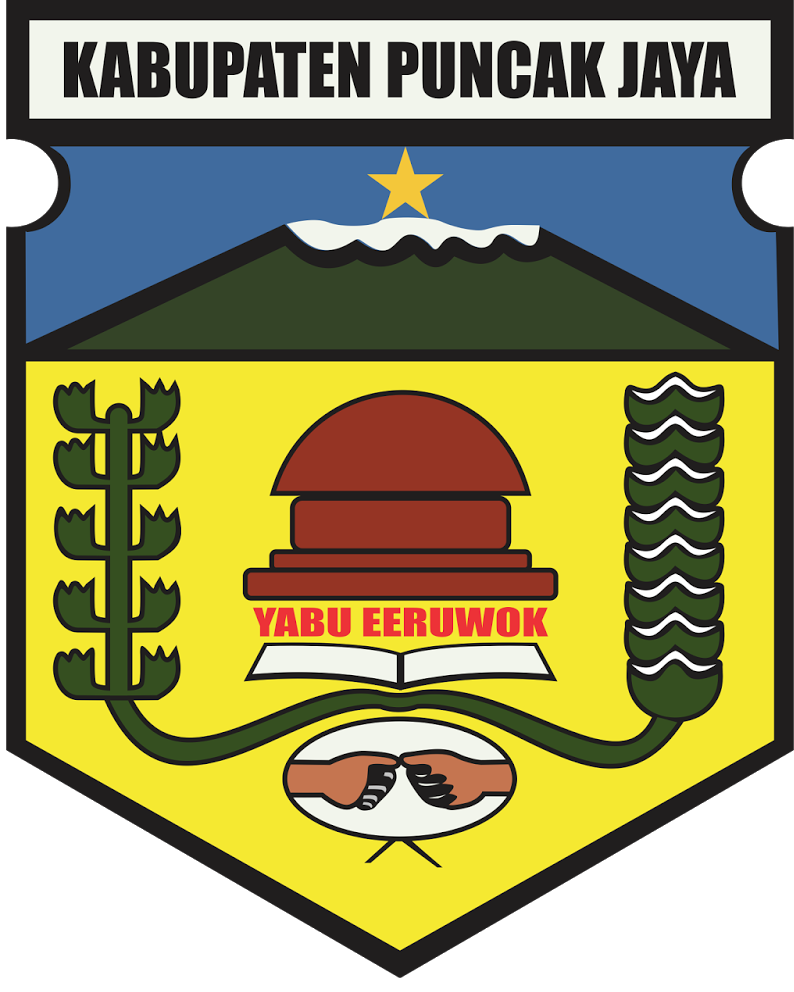
- Coat of arms
- Motto: Yabu Eeruwok
- Location within Central Papua

- Location in Indonesian Papua Location in Indonesia
- Coordinates: 3.7001°S 137.9647°E
- Country: Indonesia
- Province: Central Papua
- Capital: Mulia

Government
  - Regent: Yuni Wonda
  - Vice Regent: Mus Kogoya

Area
  - Total: 6,515 km^{2} (2,515 sq mi)

Population (mid 2025 estimate)
  - Total: 221,045
  - Density: 33.93/km^{2} (87.87/sq mi)
- Time zone: UTC+9 (IEST)
- Area code: (+62) 901
- Website: puncakjayakab.go.id

Puncak Jaya Regency is one of the regencies (kabupaten) in the Indonesian province of Central Papua. It is an inland highland regency, lying directly east of Paniai Regency and west of Jayawijaya Regency and Tolikara Regency (including those new regencies which have subsequently been created within the former boundaries of those regencies). As of 2004, it was reported that these four regencies had a population that is 93–97% ethnic Papua; however this included areas which have subsequently been formed into new regencies.

In 2008 an additional regency - simply named Puncak Regency - was created from the western part of the area of Puncak Jaya Regency. The residual Puncak Jaya Regency covers an area of 6,515 km^{2}, and had a population of 101,148 at the 2010 Census which increased to 224,527 at the 2020 Census; the official estimate as of mid 2025 was 221,045 (comprising 118,228 males and 102,817 females).

The capital of the regency is Mulia.

According to a 2009 profile in Indonesia's Tempo magazine, Puncak Jaya had sixteen districts (distrik) 147 villages, and 147,000 residents; However this did not take into account the fact that under Law No. 7/2008, eight of these districts had already been removed from Puncak Jaya Regency in 2008 and formed into a separate Puncak Regency in 2008. The 2010 Census revealed a population of 101,148 in the residual Puncak Jaya Regency, which by the 2020 Census had more than doubled to 224,527. It is a difficult ten-hour drive from Wamena (Jayawijaya Regency) to the mostly undeveloped regency. Separatists in the Free Papua Movement are active in the area.

== Administrative districts ==
At the 2010 Census, the existing regency comprised eight districts (distrik), tabulated below with their populations at the 2010 Census.

Name of District (distrik)	Pop'n 2010 Census
Fawi	3,420
Mulia	22,278
Mewoluk	5,189
Yamo	13,161
Ilu	18,344
Torere	6,710
Jigonikme	8,040
Tingginambut	24,006

However, by 2018 these had been split to create additional districts, which in 2018 numbered twenty-six, listed below with their areas and their populations at the 2020 Census and according to the official estimates as of mid 2025. The table also includes the locations of the district administrative centre, the number of administrative villages in each district (totaling 302 rural kampong and 3 urban kelurahan), and its postcode.

The nineteen new districts created by 2018 are Dagai, Dokome, Gubume, Gurage, Ilamburawi, Irimuli, Kalome, Kiyage, Lumo, Molanikime, Muara, Nioga, Nume, Pagaleme, Taganombak, Waegi, Wanwi, Yambi and Yamoneri; the previous Jigonikme District has ceased to exist.

Kode Wilayah	Name of District (distrik)	Area in km^{2}	Pop'n Census 2020	Pop'n Estimate mid 2025	Admin Centre	No. of Villages	Post code
94.02.03	Fawi	1,145	4,320	4,930	Fawi	9	98942
94.02.25	Dagai	866	4,033	4,404	Dagai	10	98941
94.02.26	Kiyage	492	5,179	5,147	Kiyage	8	98943
94.02.01	Mulia	268	32,755	34,898	Wuyukwi	11 ^{(a)}	98915
94.02.14	Yambi	206	9,364	9,388	Yambi	9	98917
94.02.13	Ilamburawi	110	6,102	5,466	Ilamburawi	5	98912
94.02.12	Muara	137	11,319	10,732	Muara	8	98914
94.02.09	Pagaleme	100	12,212	9,912	Pagaleme	5	98916
94.02.10	Gurage	162	8,704	8,253	Yarmukum	11	98911
94.02.11	Irimuli	159	8,362	9,023	Wondengobak	9	98913
94.02.04	Merwoluk	251	8,594	8,089	Merwoluk	8	98945
94.02.15	Lumo	258	10,593	8,059	Lumo	9	98944
94.02.16	Molanikime	105	4,734	4,494	Tiolome	5	98946
94.02.05	Yamo	456	10,503	9,662	Yamo	14	98925
95.02.17	Dokome	273	5,103	4,442	Dokome	9	98924
94.02.02	Ilu	270	13,393	15,036	Wurak	21 ^{(b)}	98935
94.02.20	Yamoneri	269	9,247	9,341	Yamoneri	16	98937
94.02.21	Waegi	212	10,349	8,885	Anggutare	19	98936
94.02.06	Nume	143	3,405	4,154	Nume	13	98933
94.02.22	Nioga	110	9,321	9,639	Nioga	11	98932
94.02.23	Gubume	170	5,793	6,595	Gubume	17	98931
94.02.24	Taganombak	98	4,737	5,203	Guna	10	98934
94.02.07	Torere	527	4,355	3,997	Gubugani	13	98926
94.02.08	Tingginambut	277	8,010	8,394	Tingginambut	22	98922
94.02.18	Kalome	179	8,119	8,136	Kalome	16	98921
94.02.19	Wanwi	184	5,921	4,766	Wonwi	17	98923
	Totals	6,515	224,527	221,045	Mulia	305	

Notes: (a) includes two kelurahan - the towns of Wuyukwi and Pagaleme. Note the Pagaleme kelurahan in this district is different from the Pagaleme kampong in Pagaleme District. (b) includes one kelurahan - the town of Wurak.

== Towns included ==
- Aginilia
- Buguba
- Jebegot
- Lambo
- Mulia
- Mbambawa
- Motorbivak
- Rustoord
- Splitsingbivak
- Tombage

== Climate ==
Mulia, the seat of the regency, has a subtropical highland climate (Köppen Cfb) with cool to pleasant mornings, warm to very warm afternoons, and heavy rainfall year-round.

Climate data for Mulia
Month	Jan	Feb	Mar	Apr	May	Jun	Jul	Aug	Sep	Oct	Nov	Dec	Year
Mean daily maximum °C (°F)	24.3 (75.7)	24.2 (75.6)	23.9 (75.0)	23.7 (74.7)	23.3 (73.9)	22.4 (72.3)	21.7 (71.1)	21.7 (71.1)	22.6 (72.7)	23.7 (74.7)	24.1 (75.4)	24.1 (75.4)	23.3 (74.0)
Daily mean °C (°F)	18.7 (65.7)	18.7 (65.7)	18.6 (65.5)	18.5 (65.3)	18.3 (64.9)	17.7 (63.9)	17.1 (62.8)	17.1 (62.8)	17.5 (63.5)	18.2 (64.8)	18.4 (65.1)	18.6 (65.5)	18.1 (64.6)
Mean daily minimum °C (°F)	13.1 (55.6)	13.2 (55.8)	13.4 (56.1)	13.4 (56.1)	13.3 (55.9)	13.1 (55.6)	12.6 (54.7)	12.5 (54.5)	12.4 (54.3)	12.7 (54.9)	12.7 (54.9)	13.2 (55.8)	13.0 (55.4)
Average rainfall mm (inches)	260 (10.2)	288 (11.3)	293 (11.5)	262 (10.3)	230 (9.1)	215 (8.5)	219 (8.6)	222 (8.7)	220 (8.7)	238 (9.4)	215 (8.5)	228 (9.0)	2,890 (113.8)
Source: Climate-Data.org
