= Waropen Regency =

Regency in Papua, Indonesia

Waropen Regency Kabupaten Waropen
- Regency
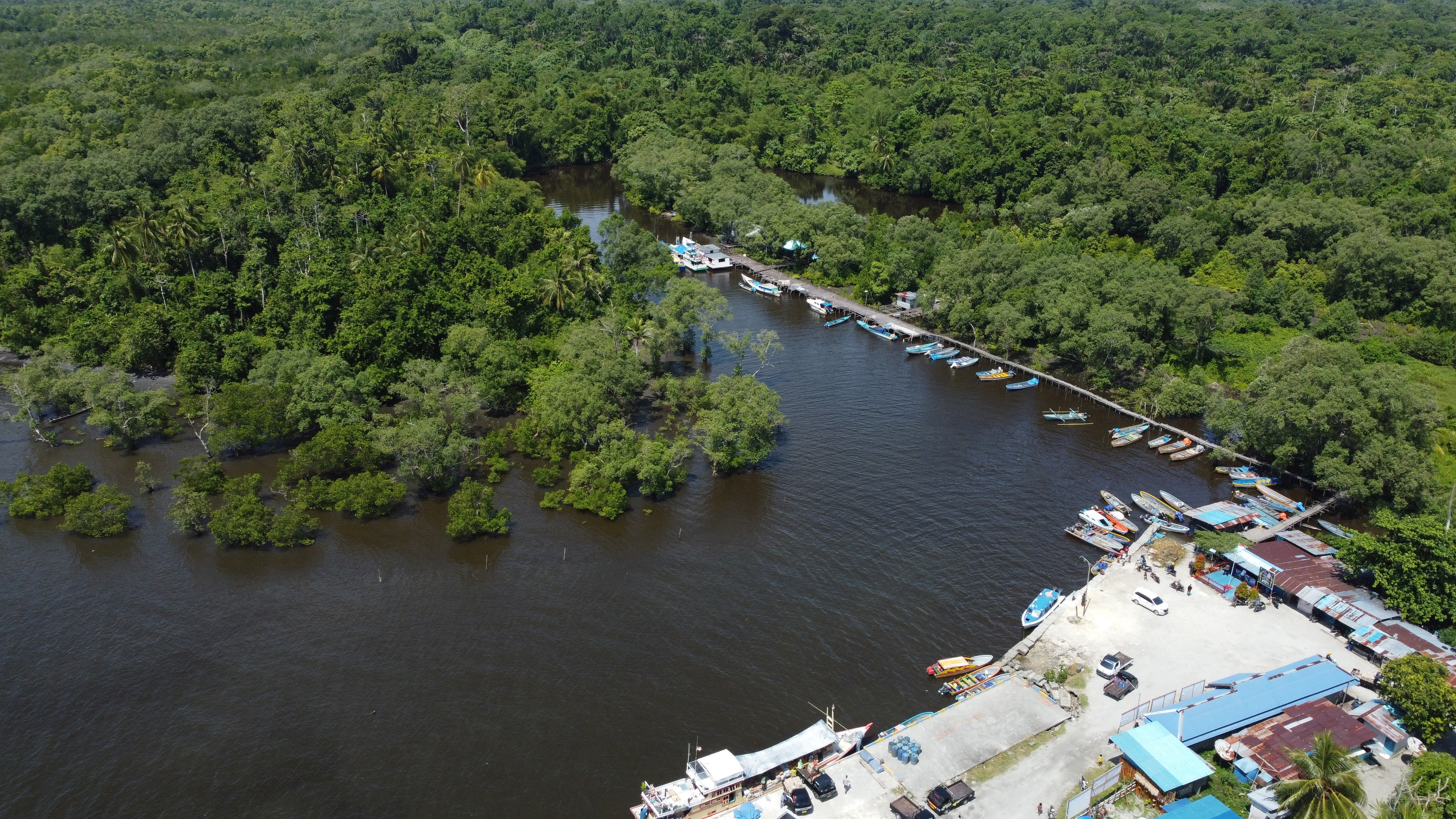
- Port of Sanggei within a mangrove area

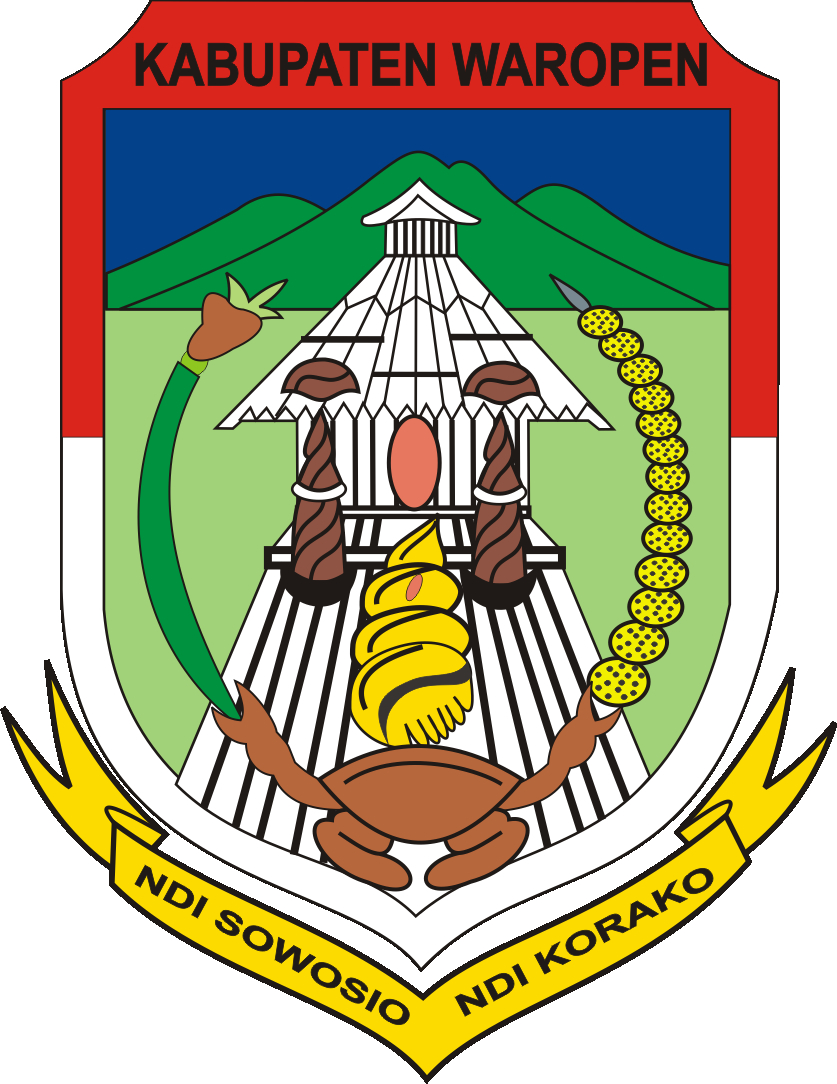
- Coat of arms
- Motto: Ndi Sowosio Ndi Korako
- Location in Papua Province

- Location in Indonesian Papua Location in Indonesia
- Coordinates: 1°52′S 137°06′E
- Country: Indonesia
- Province: Papua
- Capital: Botawa

Government
  - Regent: Fransiscus Xaverius Mote
  - Vice Regent: Yowel Boari

Area
  - Total: 10,843.97 km^{2} (4,186.88 sq mi)

Population (mid 2023 estimate)
  - Total: 37,643
  - Density: 3.4713/km^{2} (8.9907/sq mi)
- Time zone: UTC+9 (Indonesia Eastern Time)
- Area code: (+62) 981
- Website: www.waropenkab.go.id

Waropen Regency is one of the regencies (kabupaten) in Papua Province, Indonesia. The Regency covers an area of 10,843.97 km^{2}, and it had a population of 24,639 at the 2010 Census and 33,943 at the 2020 Census; the official estimate as of mid-2023 was 37,643 - comprising 19,754 males and 17,889 females. The capital is the town of Botawa.

Originally, this area comprised those districts of the former Yapen Waropen Regency which lay on the Papuan mainland, but that regency was split in two on 12 November 2002 (effective on 11 December 2002), to form the Waropen Regency on the Papuan mainland and the Yapen Islands Regency (consisting of Yapen Island and some smaller islands) in Cenderawasih Bay.

The Waropen language is spoken in the regency. The main ethnic groups that inhabit this regency are the Waropen people, and the Biak who generally inhabit coastal areas.

== Administrative districts ==
At the 2010 Census, Waropen Regency comprised ten districts (distrik), but subsequently two additional districts have been created - Soyoi Mambai and Wonti. The twelve districts are tabulated below with their areas and their populations at the 2010 Census and as officially estimated in mid 2023. The table also includes the locations of the district administrative centres, and the numbers of administrative villages (all classed as rural kampung) in each district, and its post code.

Kode Wilayah	Name of District (distrik)	Area in km^{2}	Pop'n 2010 Census	Pop'n mid 2023 Estimate	Admin centre	No. of villages	Post code
91.15.01	Waropen Bawah (Lower Waropen)	264.65	4,907	8,060	Waren I	7	98662
91.15.09	Inggerus	1,402.70	1,618	1,740	Toire	7	98661
91.15.08	Urei Faisei	131.27	6,401	11,730	Khemoon Jaya	12	98663
91.15.11	Oudate	1,581.27	1,466	1,100	Sowiwa	8	98665
91.15.12	Wapoga	885.73	1,706	2,080	Wapoga	7	98664
91.15.03	Masirei	297.15	1,315	3,200	Koweda	9	98571
91.15.07	Risei Sayati	49.97	1,627	2,910	Fafado	10	98674
91.15.13	Demba	1,291.38	2,006	2,600	Aniboi	10	98672
95.15.15	Soyoi Mambai	49.85	^{(a)}	1,460	Mambai	10	98675
95.15.14	Wonti	226.90	^{(a)}	1,390	Bokadaro	10	98676
	Walani ^{(b)}	2,128.04	2,279	n/a	Daboto	-	
91.15.10	Kirihi	2,326.45	1,314	1,390	Spoiri	10	98673
	Totals	10,638.30	24,639	37,643	Botawa	100	

Note: (a) the 2010 populations of Soyoi Mambai and Wonti Districts are included with the population of the districts (Risei Sayati and Demba) from which they were subsequently cut out. (b) separate figures for Walani District are not guaranteed, as it may have been subsumed into Kiriki District.

== Climate ==
Botawa, the seat of the regency has a tropical rainforest climate (Af) with heavy to very heavy rainfall year-round.

Climate data for Botawa
Month	Jan	Feb	Mar	Apr	May	Jun	Jul	Aug	Sep	Oct	Nov	Dec	Year
Mean daily maximum °C (°F)	31.1 (88.0)	30.9 (87.6)	31.0 (87.8)	31.1 (88.0)	31.0 (87.8)	30.3 (86.5)	29.7 (85.5)	29.9 (85.8)	30.4 (86.7)	30.9 (87.6)	31.1 (88.0)	31.1 (88.0)	30.7 (87.3)
Daily mean °C (°F)	27.0 (80.6)	26.8 (80.2)	27.0 (80.6)	27.1 (80.8)	27.1 (80.8)	26.5 (79.7)	26.0 (78.8)	26.2 (79.2)	26.5 (79.7)	26.9 (80.4)	27.0 (80.6)	27.0 (80.6)	26.8 (80.2)
Mean daily minimum °C (°F)	23.0 (73.4)	22.8 (73.0)	23.0 (73.4)	23.1 (73.6)	23.2 (73.8)	22.8 (73.0)	22.4 (72.3)	22.5 (72.5)	22.6 (72.7)	22.9 (73.2)	23.0 (73.4)	23.0 (73.4)	22.9 (73.1)
Average rainfall mm (inches)	294 (11.6)	305 (12.0)	377 (14.8)	308 (12.1)	286 (11.3)	281 (11.1)	306 (12.0)	285 (11.2)	270 (10.6)	249 (9.8)	268 (10.6)	310 (12.2)	3,539 (139.3)
Source: Climate-Data.org
