= Puncak Regency =

Regency in Central Papua, Indonesia

Puncak Papua Regency Kabupaten Puncak
- Regency
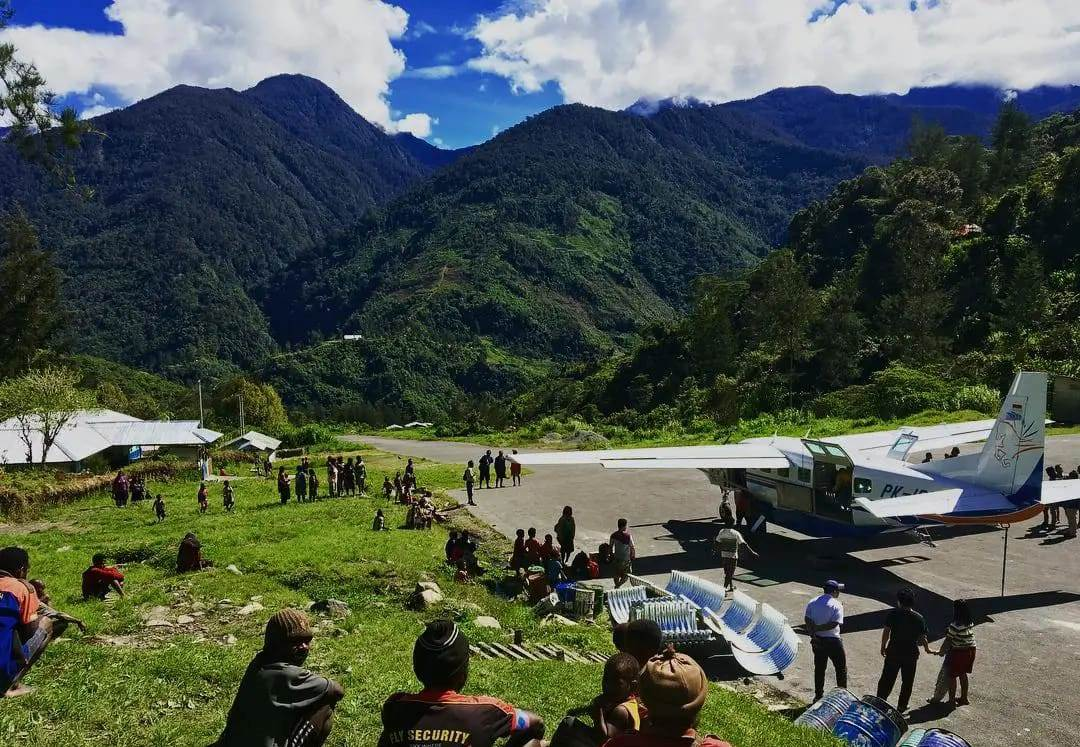
- Airport in Beoga

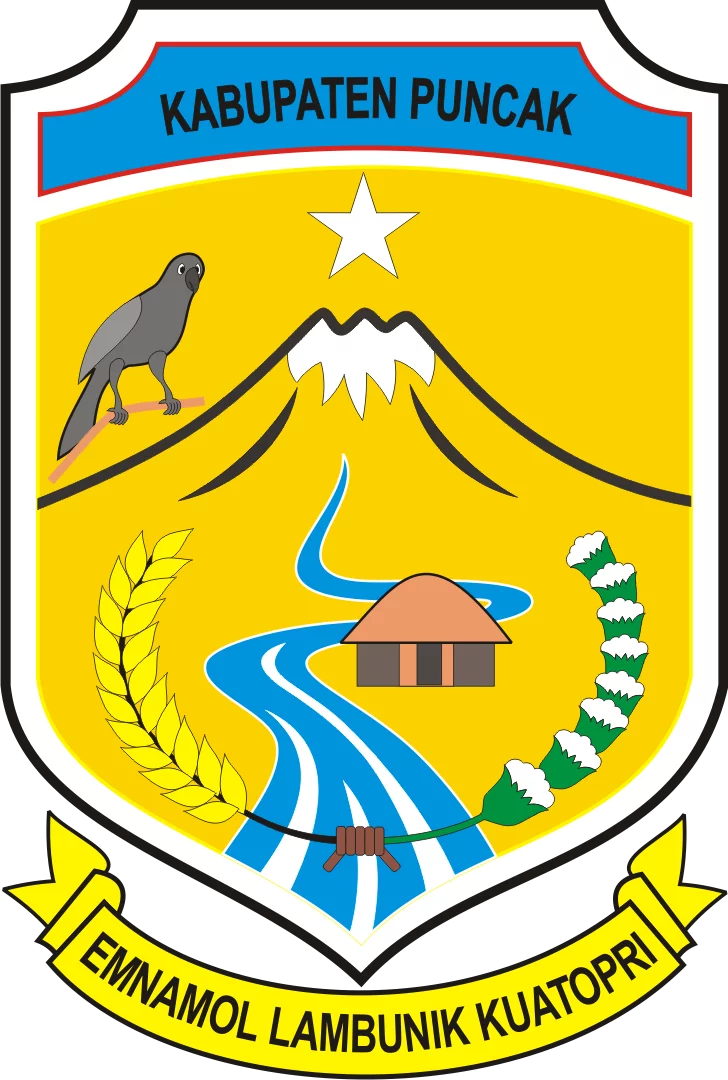
- Coat of arms
- Motto: Emnamol Lambunik Kuatopri (With Love Build the Top)
- Location in Central Papua

- Location in Indonesian Papua Location in Indonesia
- Coordinates: 3.6724°S 137.4390°E
- Country: Indonesia
- Province: Central Papua
- Capital: Ilaga

Government
  - Regent: Elvis Tabuni
  - Vice Regent: Naftali Akawal

Area
  - Total: 7,396.47 km^{2} (2,855.79 sq mi)

Population (mid 2025 estimate)
  - Total: 179,357
  - Density: 24.2490/km^{2} (62.8046/sq mi)
- Time zone: UTC+9 (Indonesia Eastern Time)
- Area code: (+62) 901
- Website: puncakkab.go.id

Puncak Regency is one of the regencies (kabupaten) in the Indonesian province of Central Papua; it is not to be confused with Puncak Jaya Regency, which is within the same province, and from whose western districts those districts now forming Puncak Papua Regency were separated in 2008. It covers an area of 7,396.47 km^{2}, and had a population of 93,218 at the 2010 Census and 114,741 at the 2020 Census; the official estimate as of mid 2025 was 179,357. The administrative centre is at Ilaga. The name of the regency was changed to Puncak Papua Regency.

== Administrative districts ==
In 2010 the new Puncak Regency comprised eight districts (distrik), tabulated below with their populations at the 2010 Census.

Name of District (distrik)	Pop'n 2010 census
Agadugume	6,478
Gome	17,683
Ilaga	15,287
Sinak	19,745
Pogoma	15,968
Wangbe	5,099
Beoga	10,810
Doufo	2,148

By 2018 the number of districts had risen to twenty-five by the splitting of existing districts. These are tabulated below with their areas and their populations at the 2020 Census, together with the official estimates as of mid-2022. The table also includes the locations of the district administrative centres, the number of administrative villages in each district (all classed as rural kampung), and its postcode.

Kode Wilayah	Name of District (distrik)	Area in km^{2}	Pop'n 2020 census	Pop'n mid 2022 estimate	Admin centre	No. of villages	Post code
94.05.07	Agandugume	95.06	1,191	3,792	Agadugume	7	98970
94.05.21	Lambewi	107.61	4,040	4,908	Wamiru	7	98973
94.05.22	Oneri	149.88	544	5,751	Jiwot	6	98975
94.05.08	Gome	205.40	4,914	11,222	Gome	10	98963
94.05.23	Amungkalpia	286.13	3,949	4,491	Bela	6	98961
94.05.24	Gome Utara (North Gome)	196.97	2,660	6,890	Welenggaru	5	98964
94.05.25	Erelmakawia	246.65	5,108	4,305	Erelmakawia	9	98962
94.05.01	Ilaga	42.31	2,447	13,160	Kimak	9	98965
94.05.18	Ilaga Utara (North Ilaga)	147.92	8,910	8,432	Mayuberi	9	98966
94.05.19	Mabugi	132.36	4,581	5,389	Pologobak	8	98967
94.05.20	Omukia	404.85	8,998	9,532	Ondugura	14	98968
94.05.06	Sinak	94.93	8,912	10,015	Gigobak	11	98977
94.05.15	Sinak Barat (West Sinak)	74.13	239	4,845	Bakcini	7	98978
94.05.16	Mage'abume	80.86	5,055	9,271	Weni	11	98974
94.05.17	Yugumuak	29.27	1,994	8,597	Wobulo	10	98979
94.05.05	Pogoma	309.87	6,469	6,838	Pogoma	9	98976
94.05.13	Kembru	237.83	6,982	7,321	Kembru	7	98972
94.05.14	Bina	295.87	3,686	4,987	Bina	7	98971
94.05.02	Wangbe	113.48	8,452	9,423	Wangbe	11	98955
94.05.12	Ogamanin	180.69	6,773	6,717	Ogamanin	7	98954
94.05.03	Beoga	295.87	8,387	10,345	Milawak	8	98951
94.05.10	Beoga Barat (West Beoga)	355.64	3,536	7,577	Kelmabet	6	98952
94.05.11	Beoga Timur (East Beoga)	809.01	5,220	5,522	Kelandiruma	8	98953
94.05.04	Doufo	1,009.73	546	4,483	Doufo	7	98982
94.05.09	Dervos	1,494.15	1,148	5,544	Dervos	7	98981
	Totals	7,396.47	114,741	179,357	Ilaga	206	
