= List of districts of Papua =

The province of Papua (Provinsi Papua) in Indonesia is divided into eight kabupaten (regencies) and one independent kota (city) which in turn are divided administratively into districts, known as distrik under the law of 2001 on "special autonomy for Papua province".

== List ==
The districts of Papua (as now reduced by the reorganisation of July 2022, which separated twenty regencies previously part of Papua Province into three new provinces of Central Papua, Highland Papua and South Papua) and their respective regencies are as follows (as of December 2019). Administrative villages (desa in rural areas and kelurahan in urban areas) are also listed for each district.

Regency	District	Languages in district	Administrative villages
Biak Numfor	Aimando Padaido		Anobo, Karabai, Mbromsi, Mias Mangguandi (Meos Manguandi / Mangguandi), Nyansoren, Padaido, Pasi, Samber Pasi, Saribra, Sasarari (Sasari), Supraima, Yen Manaina, Yeri
Biak Numfor	Andey		Armnu, Dasdo, Faknikdi, Mamorbo, Rodifu, Rumbin, Sup Mbrur, Warbinsi, Wodu, Wonabraidi, Wouna
Biak Numfor	Biak Barat		Amponbukor, Andei, Asarkir, Asaryendi, Banasrares, Dedifu, Dousi, Insiri, Kababur, Kanaan, Karnindi, Mamoribo, Marisen, Opuri, Rarsbari, Sopendo, Sopendo Sup Karkir, Sosmay / Sosmai, Sumbinya (Sunbinya), Warberik (Waberik), Wasyai, Yomdori
Biak Numfor	Biak Kota		Anggraidi, Babrinbo, Burokup (Burokub), Fandoi, Inggiri, Inggupi, Insrom, Kababur, Karyendi, Mandala, Manggandisapi, Manswam (Manswan), Mnubabo (Ambroben), Mokmer, Paray (Parai), Samau, Sanumi, Saramon (Saramom), Sorido, Swapodibo, Waupnor, Yenures
Biak Numfor	Biak Timur		Adorbari, Afefbo, Bindusi, Bosnik Sup, Inmdi, Inofi, Insumamires (Insumarires), Kajasbo, Kajasi, Mandon, Orwer, Owi, Rim, Rimba Jaya, Ruar, Sareidi (Saraeidi), Seepse (Sepse), Soon, Soryar, Sunde, Waderbo, Wasori, Woniki, Yenberok, Yendakem, Yenusi
Biak Numfor	Biak Utara		Andei, Dernafi, Dofyo Wafor, Kobeoser, Korem, Mambesak, Mnuswor, Nermnu, Rosayendi (Rosayendo), Sarwom, Saukobye, Warbon, Wari, Waromi, Warsansan, Yobdi
Biak Numfor	Bondifuar		Doubo, Sansundi, Syurdori, Wandos, Wopes
Biak Numfor	Bruyadori		Amberparem (Amperem), Arimi Jaya, Bruyadori, Dafi, Duai, Kamumi, Mandori, Mandori Sup, Sandou (Sandau), Warbukor
Biak Numfor	Numfor Barat		Baruki, Kameri, Kansai, Mambodo Sawai, Namber, Pomdori Sup, Pondori (Pomdori), Rimbaraya, Semayen, Serbin, Sub Manggunsi (Subangungsi / Submanggunsi), Warido
Biak Numfor	Numfor Timur		Asaibori, Asaryendi, Barkori, Indaibori, Kornasoren, Pyefuri, Rarsibo, Yenburwo, Yenmaru
Biak Numfor	Oridek		Anggaduber, Anggopi, Animi, Bakribo, Kakur, Makmakerbo, Marauw (Marao), Opiaref, Sauri, Sawa, Sawadori, Tanjung Barari, Wadibu, Yensama
Biak Numfor	Orkeri		Manwor Indah, Masyarah (Masyara), Pakreki, Rawar, Saribi, Sub Mander (Supmander), Wansra, Yenbeba, Yenbebon (Yenbepon)
Biak Numfor	Padaido		Auki, Inyebomi (Inbeyomi), Kanai, Nusi, Nusi Babaruk, Pai, Paidori, Sandidori (Sandedori), Sokani, Sorina, Wundi
Biak Numfor	Poiru		Andei, Andei Sup, Bawei, Koryakam, Manggari, Saunbri (Sauribru), Sauri, Serdori, Syoribu (Syoribo)
Biak Numfor	Samofa		Adainasnosen, Anjarew, Anjereuw, Brambaken, Darmopis, Kamorfuar, Karang Mulia, Kinmom, Mandouw, Mansinyas, Maryendi, Sambawofuar, Samofa, Snerbo, Sumberker, Wisata Binsari, Yafdas
Biak Numfor	Swandiwe		Andoina, Busdori, Farusi, Insusbari, Mardori, Mendenderi (Mandenderi), Napdori, Orkdori, Ramdori, Sarwa, Saswarbo, Swainober, Swaipak, Wombrisau (Wombrisauw), Yenbepioper (Yembepioper)
Biak Numfor	Warsa		Aman, Amoi (Ammoy), Biawer, Diano, Imbari, Inswambesi (Inswanbesi), Inswambesi Sup (Inswanbesi Sup), Inyobi, Karuiberik, Komboi (Komboy), Koyomi, Mamfias, Manbeori, Maniri, Marur, Sawai (Saway), Warawaf, Wasani, Wir Insos, Yeruboi (Yeruboy)
Biak Numfor	Yawosi		Asur, Bosnabraidi, Indawi, Karmon, Madirai, Syor (Soor / Sor), Wasori, Yawosi (Fanindi)
Biak Numfor	Yendidori		Adoki, Amyabenram, Binyeri, Birubi (Birub), Inpendi, Kabidon, Maobaken (Moibaken), Padwa, Padwa Pantai, Rarpimbo (Rarmpimbo / Rampimbo), Samber, Samber Sup, Suneri, Sunyar, Syabes, Urfu, Waroi (Waroy), Wirmaker, Yendidori
Jayapura	Abepura		Abepantai, Asano, Awiyo, Engros (Enggros), Kota Baru, Koya Koso, Nafri, Waena, Yobe
Jayapura	Airu		Aurina, Hulu Atas, Kamikaru, Muara Nawa (Muarah Mawa), Naira, Pagai
Jayapura	Demta	Demta	Ambora, Demta (Demta Kota), Kamdera, Muaif, Muris Kecil, Yakore, Yaugapsa (Yougapsa)
Jayapura	Depapre		Doromena, Entiyebo, Kendate, Tablasupa, Waiya, Wambena, Yefase (Yepase), Yewena
Jayapura	Ebungfao (Ebungfau / Ebungfa)		Abar (Atabar), Babrongko (Ifar Bobrongko), Ebungfa, Khameyoka (Khameyaka / Kameyoka / Khamaeka), Simporo (Babo / Yosiba / Homf)
Jayapura	Gresi Selatan	Gresi	Bangai, Iwon, Klaisu, Omon
Jayapura	Heram		Hedam, Waena, Yabansai, Yoka
Jayapura	Jayapura Selatan		Ardipura, Argapura, Entrop, Hamadi, Numbai (Numbay), Tahima Sorama, Tobati, Vim, Wahno, Way Mhorock
Jayapura	Jayapura Utara		Angkasapura, Bayangkara (Bhayangkara), Gurabesi, Imbi, Kayo Batu, Mandala, Tanjung Ria, Trikora
Jayapura	Kaureh		Lapua, Sebum, Soskotek, Umbron, Yadouw (Yadauw)
Jayapura	Kemtuk	Kemtuk	Aib, Benggwin Progo (Bengguin Progo), Kwansu, Mamda, Mamei (Namei), Manda Yawan (Mandayawan), Nambom (Nambon), Sabeab Kecil, Sama, Sekori, Skoaim, Soaib
Jayapura	Kemtuk Gresi		Braso, Bring, Dementin (Demetin), Domoikati (Damoi Kati), Hatib, Hyansip, Ibub, Jagrang, Nembu Gresi, Pupehabu, Swentab, Yanbra (Yanim)
Jayapura	Muara Tami		Holtekamp, Koya Barat, Koya Tengah, Koya Timur, Mosso, Skow Mabo (Skouw Mabo), Skow Sae (Skouw Sae), Skow Yambe (Skouw Yambe)
Jayapura	Nambluong		Besum, Hanggaiy Hamong, Imestum (Imustum), Karya Bumi, Sanggai, Sarmai Atas, Sarmai Bawah, Sumbe, Yakasib (Yakasip / Yokasib)
Jayapura	Nimbokrang		Benyom Jaya I, Benyom Jaya II, Berab, Bunyom, Hamonggrang (Hamongkrang), Nembukrang (Nimbokrang), Nombukrang Sari (Nembukrang / Nimbokrang Sari), Rhepang Muaf (Rhepang Muaif / Muaib), Wahab
Jayapura	Nimboran	Nimboran	Benyom, Gemebs, Imsar, Kaitemung (Kautemung), Kuipon (Kuipons), Kuwase, Meyu, Oyengsi, Pobaim, Singgri, Singgriway (Singgriwai), Tabri, Yenggu (Yenggu Lama), Yenggu Baru
Jayapura	Raveni Rara (Ravenirara)		Nehibe (Nacha Tawa), Ormuwari (Newa), Yongsu Besar (Dosoyo), Yongsu Sapari
Jayapura	Sentani	Sentani	Dobonsolo, Hinekombe, Hobong, Ifale (Ilfele), Ifar Besar, Keheran (Kehiran), Sentani Kota, Sereh, Yahim, Yobeh
Jayapura	Sentani Barat		Dosay (Dosai), Maribu, Sabron Sari, Sabron Yaru (Sabro Yaru), Waibron
Jayapura	Sentani Timur		Asei Besar, Asei Kecil, Ayapo (Itakiwa), Nendali, Nolokla, Puay (Puai), Yokiwa
Jayapura	Unurum Guay		Beneik, Ganusa (Garusa), Guriyad (Guryard), Nandalzi (Nandaizi), Sawesuma (Sawa Suma), Sentosa (Santosa)
Jayapura	Waibu		Bambar, Dondai (Donday), Doyo Baru, Doyo Lama, Kwadeware (Kanda), Sosiri, Yakonde
Jayapura	Yapsi		Bumi Sahaja, Bundru, Kwarja (Kwaja), Nawa Mukti, Nawa Mulya, Ongan Jaya, Purnawajati (Purnama Jati), Tabbeyan (Tabeyan), Taqwa / Takwa Bangun
Jayapura	Yokari		Buseryo, Endokisi, Maruwai (Maruway), Meukisi, Senamay (Snamay)
Keerom	Arso		Arso Kota, Asyaman, Bagia, Bibiosi, Kwimi, Sawabuun, Sawanawa, Ubiyau, Workwana, Yamta, Yanamaa, Yuwanain
Keerom	Arso Barat		Baburia, Dukwia, Ifia-fia, Sanggaria, Warbo, Yammua, Yatu Raharja, Yowong
Keerom	Arso Timur		Amyu, Kibay, Kikere (Pikere), Kriku, Petewi, Sangke, Skofro, Suskun, Yetti
Keerom	Kaisenar		Kaisenar, Kiambra, Liket, Onam, Tefanma Satu
Keerom	Mannem	Manem	Pyawi, Sawyatami, Uskwar, Wambes, Wembi, Wonorejo, Yamara
Keerom	Senggi	Senggi	Molof, Namla, Senggi, Usku, Waley, Warlef, Woslay
Keerom	Skanto		Alang-alang Raya, Arsopura, Gudang Garam, Intaimelyan, Jaifuri, Naramben, Saefen Empat Dua, Skanto, Traimelyan, Walma, Wiantre, Wulukubun
Keerom	Towe	Towei	Bias, Jember, Lules, Milki, Niliti, Pris, Tefalma (Tefanma), Terfones, Towe Atas, Towe Hitam
Keerom	Waris	Waris	Ampas, Banda, Bompai, Kalifam, Kalimala, Pund, Sack, Yuwainda
Keerom	Web		Dubu, Embi, Semografi, Tatakra, Umuraf (Umuaf), Yamraf Dua
Keerom	Yaffi	Yafi	Akarinda, Amgotro, Fafenumbu, Jifanggry, Monggoafi, Yabanda, Yuruf
Kepulauan Yapen	Angkaisera		Aitiri, Kainui I, Kainui II, Mananayam, Menawi, Ransarnoni, Roipi, Roipi Dua, Wadapi, Wanampompi, Wawuti
Kepulauan Yapen	Anotaurei		Anatorei (Anotaurei), Famboaman, Kandowarira, Ketu Api, Mantembu, Mariaderi, Warari, Yapan
Kepulauan Yapen	Kepulauan Ambai		Adiwipi, Aiwaraggani, Ambai I, Ambai II, Bairei, Baisore, Dorau, Imboriawa, Kawipi, Mambawi, Marawi, Nuniandei, Perea, Rondepi, Saweru, Toroa, Umani, Wamori
Kepulauan Yapen	Kosiwo		Ambaidiru, Ariepi, Ariepi Dua, Aromarea, Kamanap, Kanawa, Mambo, Manainin, Maria Rotu (Mariarotu / Mariar Rotu), Numaman, Panduami (Pandoami / Panduani), Ramangkurani, Sarawandori Dua, Serawandori (Sarawandori), Tatui
Kepulauan Yapen	Poom		Humbe Awai, Makiroan (Mokiroan), Nurawi, Poom I, Poom II, Rasiri (Woisiri), Serewen, Worioi (Wariori)
Kepulauan Yapen	Pulau Kurudu		Andesaria (Andersaria), Doreiamini (Doreianmini), Kaipuri, Kirimbri, Kurudu, Mansesi, Manusundu, Mnukwar
Kepulauan Yapen	Pulau Yerui		Ausem, Jeniari, Miosnum, Umpeki, Yeituarau
Kepulauan Yapen	Raimbawi		Aisau, Barawai, Kororompui, Sawendui, Sewenui, Waindu, Woda
Kepulauan Yapen	Teluk Ampimoi		Ampimoi, Arareni, Ayari, Bareraipi (Barerai / Bareraif), Karoaipi (Koroapi), Randawaya, Siromi, Tarei, Wabuayar (Wabuayer), Waita, Warironi
Kepulauan Yapen	Windesi		Aryobu, Asai, Kairawi (Karawi), Kaonda, Munggui, Rosbori, Saruman, Waisani, Windesi
Kepulauan Yapen	Wonawa		Aibondeni, Awado, Dumani, Haihorei, Jaimaria, Kanaki, Karemoni, Rembai, Woinap, Wooi
Kepulauan Yapen	Yapen Barat		Ansus, Inowa, Kairawi, Maniri, Marau, Narei, Natabui, Nuiwiora, Papuma (Papuama), Sasawa, Toweta, Warabori, Webi, Wimoni, Woiwani, Yarori, Yenusi Marau
Kepulauan Yapen	Yapen Selatan		Banawa, Barawaikap, Bawai, Imandoa, Manaini, Nundawipi, Pasir Hitam, Pasir Putih, Serui Jaya, Serui Kota, Serui Laut, Tarau, Turu
Kepulauan Yapen	Yapen Timur		Awunawai, Dawai, Duai, Korombobi (Karombobi), Mareruni (Mereruni / Maseruni), Nunsembai (Hunsembai), Nunsiari, Sere Sere, Wabo, Wabompi, Woinsupi (Waisopi)
Kepulauan Yapen	Yapen Utara		Doreimanona, Kiriyou (Kiriyow), Roswari (Artaneng), Sambrawai (Samrawai), Soromasen (Soromasem), Tindaret, Yobi
Kepulauan Yapen	Yawakukat		Borai, Kabuaena, Kontinuai, Rambai, Sanayoka, Woniwon, Yafanani
Mamberamo Raya	Benuki		Baitanasa, Dadat, Gesa Baru, Kamai, Kerema, Taya, Teuw, Watiaro
Mamberamo Raya	Mamberamo Hilir		Bagusa, Baudi, Kapeso, Suaseso, Trimuris, Warembori, Yoke
Mamberamo Raya	Mamberamo Hulu		Dabra, Dou, Fokri, Fuao, Haiya, Pepasena I, Pepasena II, Taiyeve
Mamberamo Raya	Mamberamo Tengah		Anggreso, Babija, Burmeso, Danau Bira, Kasonaweja, Kwerba, Marina Valen, Metaweja, Muru Mare, Namunaweja, Sosawakwesar
Mamberamo Raya	Mamberamo Tengah Timur		Biri, Eri, Kustra, Noyadi, Obogai, Towae, Wakeyadi
Mamberamo Raya	Rufaer		Bareri, Fona, Kai, Sikari, Taria, Tayai
Mamberamo Raya	Sawai		Anasi, Bonoi, Poiwai, Rapambrei, Sorabi, Tamakuri
Mamberamo Raya	Waropen Atas		Barapasi, Bariwaro, Bensor, Marikai, Nadofoai, Rawiwa, Sipisi
Sarmi	Apawer Hulu		Airoran, Aurimi, Bina, Kwawitania, Maniwa, Murara, Sasawapece, Surimania (Syurimania), Tamaja (Tamaya), Wamariri
Sarmi	Bonggo	Bonggo	Anus, Armopa, Bebon Jaya, Kiren, Krim Podena, Maweswares (Mawesres), Rimsersari (Rimser Sari), Rotea, Tarontha Srum (Taronta Srum), Tetom
Sarmi	Bonggo Timur		Gwinjaya (Gwin Jaya), Kapitiau (Kaptiau), Mawes Mukti, Mawesday, Tamar Sari (Tamas Sari)
Sarmi	Pantai Barat		Arbais, Aruswar, Burgena, Kamenawari, Kapeso, Karfasia, Masep, Mertewar (Martewar), Nisro, Niwerawar, Samorkena, Siantoa, Subu, Waim, Wari, Webro
Sarmi	Pantai Timur		Ansudu (Ansubi), Ansudu Dua (Ansudu II / Srem), Betaf, Betaf Dua (Betaf II / Tamnir), Komra, Sunum (Yamna), Yamben (Jamber / Beneraf)
Sarmi	Pantai Timur Bagian Barat		Arare, Dabe, Dabe Dua (Dabe II), Finyabor (Vinyabor), Finyabor Dua, Keder Lama, Nengke, Nengke Dua (Nengke II / Nengke Baru), Tambrawar (Tabrawar), Timron / Keder (Timron), Wakde
Sarmi	Sarmi		Armo, Bagaiserwar, Bagaisewar II, Lembah Neidam, Liki, Mararena, Pulau Armo, Sarmi Kota (Sarmi), Sarmo, Sawar, Tefarewar
Sarmi	Sarmi Selatan		Amsira, Angkasa Dua, Kasukwe, Munukania (Manukania), Siaratesa, Wapo
Sarmi	Sarmi Timur		Bagaiserwar Dua, Binyer, Ebram, Holmafen, Sewan, Tanjung Batu, Waskey, Waskey / Tanjung Batu
Sarmi	Tor Atas	Tor languages	Bota-Bora, Denander, Denender, Kanderjan, Omte, Safrom Tane, Safron Tane, Samanente, Toganto, Waaf
Supiori	Kepulauan Aruri		Aruri, Imbrisbari (Imbirsbari), Ineki, Insumbrei, Manggonswan (Mangoswan), Mbrurwandi (Mbruwandi / Bruwandi), Rayori, Wonggeina (Wongkeina), Yamnaisu
Supiori	Supiori Barat		Amyas, Koryakam (Koiryakam), Mapia, Masyai, Napisndi (Napisandi), Waryei (Wariyei), Wayori (Mayori)
Supiori	Supiori Selatan		Awaki, Biniki, Didiabolo, Fanindi, Maryaidori, Odori, Warbefondi (Waberfondi / Warbepondi)
Supiori	Supiori Timur		Douwbo (Doubo), Duber, Marsram, Sauyas, Sorendidori (Sorendiweri), Syurdori, Wafor, Waryesi, Wombonda, Yawerma
Supiori	Supiori Utara		Fanjur, Kobari Jaya, Puweri, Warbor, Warsa
Waropen	Demba		Aiwa, Aniboi, Biati, Demba, Fafai, Mayaghaido, Ronarai, Tetui, Urato, Wudokuri
Waropen	Inggerus		Awaso, Demisa, Firo, Harapan Jaya, Otodemo, Somiangga, Toire
Waropen	Kirihi		Aru Antu (Antu Aru), Dairi, Dirou, Diwah (Diwa), Foira (Poira), Kawari, Kuaisa, Sooh, Spoiri, Wafuka
Waropen	Masirei		Bunggu, Emauri, Kali Baru, Kowogi, Obutay, Saurisirami, Sinonde, Sirami, Wairo
Waropen	Oudate		Baino Jaya, Botawa, Moroa, Nau, Oiboa, Rasawa, Ruambak Jaya, Sowiwa
Waropen	Risei Sayati		Aimasi, Fafado, Ghaiwando, Ghaiwaru, Mui, Orambin, Unareu, Waghare, Wobari, Womorisi
Waropen	Soyoi Mambai		Daimboa, Dawoa, Fafarui, Mambai, Napani, Segha, Sinabo, Soyoi, Wainarisi, Woinui
Waropen	Urei Faisei		Apainabo, Ghoyui, Khemoon Jaya (Kemon Jaya), Mambui, Nubuai, Paradoi, Ronggaiwa, Rorisi, Ureifaisei I / Sanggae (Ureifasei Satu / I), Ureifaisei III / Paradoi (Ureifasei Tiga / III), Urfas II (Ureifasei Dua / II), Usaiwa
Waropen	Wapoga		Awera, Dokis, Kamarisano, Pirare, Syewa Merare, Wapoga, Waweri
Waropen	Waropen Bawah		Batu Zaman, Nonomi, Sarafambai, Sawara Jaya, Uri, Waren Dua (II), Waren Satu (I)
Waropen	Wonti		Bakadaro, Borumei, Fimore, Gheroi, Ghoiwi Samberi, Moyufuri, Odase, Sifuisera, Wanda, Wonti Kai

== See also ==
- List of districts of Central Papua
- List of districts of Highland Papua
- List of districts of South Papua
- List of districts of West Papua
