= List of incumbent regional heads and deputy regional heads in Papua =

The following is an article about the list of Regional Heads and Deputy Regional Heads in 9 regencies/cities in Papua who are currently still serving.

== List ==
Regency/ City	Photo of the Regent/ Mayor	Regent/ Mayor	Photo of Deputy Regent/ Mayor	Deputy Regent/ Mayor	Taking Office	End of Office (Planned)	Ref.
Biak Numfor; Regency List of Regents/Deputy Regents		Markus Oktovianus Mansnembra		Jimmy Carter Rumbarar Kapissa	20 February 2025	20 February 2030	
Jayapura; Regency List of Regents/Deputy Regents		Yunus Wonda		Haris Richard Yocku	25 March 2025	25 March 2030	
Keerom; Regency List of Regents/Deputy Regents		Piter Gusbager		Daud	20 February 2025	20 February 2030	
Yapen Islands; Regency List of Regents/Deputy Regents		Benyamin Arisoy		Roi Palunga	20 February 2025	20 February 2030	
Mamberamo Raya; Regency List of Regents/Deputy Regents		Robby Wilson Rumansara		Keven Totouw	20 February 2025	20 February 2030	
Sarmi; Regency List of Regents/Deputy Regents		Dominggus Catue		Jumriati	20 February 2025	20 February 2030	
Supiori; Regency List of Regents/Deputy Regents		Heronimus Mansoben		Sahrul Hasanudin Nunsi	20 February 2025	20 February 2030	
Waropen; Regency List of Regents/Deputy Regents		Fransiscus Xaverius Mote		Yowel Boari	20 February 2025	20 February 2030	
Jayapura; City List of Mayors/Deputy mayors		Abisai Rollo		Rustan Saru	20 February 2025	20 February 2030	

Notes

- "Commencement of office" is the inauguration date at the beginning or during the current term of office. For acting regents/mayors, it is the date of appointment or extension as acting regent/mayor.
- Based on the Constitutional Court decision Number 27/PUU-XXII/2024, the Governor and Deputy Governor, Regent and Deputy Regent, and Mayor and Deputy Mayor elected in 2020 shall serve until the inauguration of the Governor and Deputy Governor, Regent and Deputy Regent, and Mayor and Deputy Mayor elected in the 2024 national simultaneous elections as long as the term of office does not exceed 5 (five) years.

== See also ==
- Papua
