= Tofanma language =

Language in Papua

Tofanma
- Region: Papua: Keerom Regency, Senggi District, most of Namla, Tofanma Dua, and Tofanma Satu villages
- Native speakers: 250 (2005)
- Language family: Pauwasi: West Pauwasi; Namla–Tofanma; Tofanma

Language codes
- ISO 639-3: tlg
- Glottolog: tofa1246
- ELP: Tofanma

Tofanma or Tofamna is a poorly documented Papuan language of Indonesia. Wurm (1975) placed it as an independent branch of Trans–New Guinea, but Ross (2005) could not find enough evidence to classify it. It appears to be related to Namla, a neighboring language.

== Vocabulary ==
Tofanma vocabulary from Foley (2018):

gloss	Tofanma
‘bird’	yetai
‘blood’	læki
‘bone’	da
‘breast’	mu
‘ear’	kemblale
‘eat’	dimisipe
‘egg’	li
‘eye’	yei
‘fire’	ve
‘give’	vænə
‘go’	wao
‘ground’	yai
‘hair’	kemblena
‘hear’	varli
‘I’	ne
‘leg’	wukudaʔ
‘louse’	bili
‘man’	lamle
‘moon’	min-yaku
‘name’	ame
‘one’	kenanu
‘road, path’	mæki
‘see’	mæsi
‘sky’	nəmlo
‘stone’	kəlo
‘sun’	yaku
‘tongue’	kuguku
‘tooth’	dimi
‘tree’	la
‘two’	næni
‘water’	basu
‘we’	ngu
‘woman’	ale
‘you (sg)’	wo
‘you (pl)’	dule

The following basic vocabulary words are from Voorhoeve (1971, 1975), as cited in the Trans-New Guinea database:

gloss	Tofanma
head	kemble
hair	kemble-na
ear	kemb lelu
eye	jei; yei
nose	məniti
tooth	geme
tongue	goŋgogok
leg	wanta
louse	bli
bird	jetai; yetai
egg	taili
blood	leki
bone	nta
skin	jefake; yefake
breast	mo
tree	kili
man	lame
woman	ale
sun	jaku; yaku
moon	menti-gaku
water	basu
fire	we
stone	klo
road, path	meka
name	emi
eat	sembe
one	kenano
two	neni
