= Namla–Tofanma languages =

Language family of New Guinea

Namla–Tofanma
- Geographic distribution: Papua: Keerom Regency, Senggi District
- Linguistic classification: Pauwasi: West Pauwasi; Namla–Tofanma
- Subdivisions: Namla; Tofanma

Language codes
- Glottolog: naml1239

The Namla–Tofanma languages are a small family of languages of New Guinea, consisting of Namla and Tofanma. Usher (2020) classifies them as a branch of the West Pauwasi languages. Foley (2018) classifies them as an independent language family.
