= Upper Tor District =

District of Papua, Indonesia

Upper Tor Tor Atas
- District
- Location in Western New Guinea and Indonesia Upper Tor (Indonesia)
- Country: Indonesia
- Region: Western New Guinea
- Province: (Papua (province)) Papua
- Regency: Sarmi Regency
- Time zone: UTC+9 (Indonesia Eastern Time)
- Climate: Af

Upper Tor District (Indonesian: Distrik Tor Atas) is a district in Sarmi Regency, Papua, Indonesia.

== Villages ==
As of 2019, Tor Atas District consists of 10 administrative villages (kampung). The indigenous Papuan languages spoken in each village are also listed below.

- Bota-Bora (Berik language speakers)
- Denander
- Denender
- Kanderjan (Berik language speakers)
- Omte
- Safrom Tane
- Safron Tane (Berik language speakers)
- Samanente (Berik language speakers)
- Toganto (Berik language speakers)
- Waaf (Berik language speakers)
