= Usku language =

Pauwasi language spoken in Indonesia

Usku
- Afra
- Region: Usku village, Senggi District, Keerom Regency, Papua, Indonesia
- Native speakers: 20 to 160 (2007)
- Language family: Pauwasi: West Pauwasi; Usku

Language codes
- ISO 639-3: ulf
- Glottolog: usku1243
- ELP: Afra
- Usku is classified as Critically Endangered by the UNESCO Atlas of the World's Languages in Danger.

Usku, or Afra, is a nearly extinct and poorly documented Papuan language spoken by 20 or more people, mostly adults, in Usku village, Senggi District, Keerom Regency, Papua, Indonesia.

Wurm (1975) placed it as an independent branch of Trans–New Guinea, but Ross (2005) could not find enough evidence to classify it. Usher (2020) found that it was one of the West Pauwasi languages, though divergent from the other two branches of that family. Foley (2018) classifies Usku as a language isolate.

An automated computational analysis (ASJP 4) by Müller et al. (2013) found lexical similarities between Usku and Kaure. However, since the analysis was automatically generated, the grouping could be either due to mutual lexical borrowing or genetic inheritance.

== Basic vocabulary ==
Basic vocabulary of Usku from Im (2006), quoted by Foley (2018):

Usku basic vocabulary
gloss	Usku
'bird'	rkwe
'blood'	misie
'bone'	kra
'breast'	mi
'ear'	bekria
'eat'	nggreka
'egg'	kri
'eye'	nifi
'fire'	yo
'give'	roti
'go'	rifri
'ground'	taʔ
'hair'	klekondia
'hear'	yukri
'I'	o
'leg'	nafu
'louse'	nimi
'man'	na
'moon'	menggrine
'name'	təkwar
'one'	kuskafi
'road, path'	tra
'see'	fra
'sky'	mumgre
'stone'	pani
'sun'	winene
'tongue'	bra
'tooth'	ninggre
'tree'	ninani
'two'	narse
'water'	a/æ
'we'	no
'woman'	ria
'you (sg)'	po
'you (pl)'	so

The following basic vocabulary words are from the Trans-New Guinea database:

gloss	Usku
head	flekle
hair	flekle-kunda
ear	beikli
eye	nifi
tooth	neŋkle
tongue	bra
leg	nafu
louse	nimi
bird	lokwe
egg	kle
blood	kla; mise
bone	kla; mi
skin	ninje; ninye
breast	kiombra
tree	weli
man	mekenja; mekenya
woman	jomia
sun	nei
moon	meŋgerne
water	ei
fire	jo; yo
stone	pane
road, path	tra
eat	kepo
one	kisifaini
two	narna

== Morphology ==
Usku morphology as inferred by Foley (2018):

- dative marker se
- tense suffix -mu ~ -mo
- allative postposition se
- ablative e

== Sentences ==
Word order in Usku is SOV.

Some of the few documented sentences in Usku are:

e wang o ai se roti-mo
3 money 1SG father DAT give-TNS
‘She gave money to my father.’

e kompong se rifli-mo
3 village DAT go-TNS
‘He went to the village.’

kɨnmar kompong e duar-mo
person village ABL come-TNS
‘That person came from the village.’

kɨnmar mra-mu ya-mu
person dog-ERG/FOC? bite-TNS
‘The dog bit that person.’
