= Tebi–Towe languages =

Language family on New Guinea

Tebi–Towe
- Geographic distribution: Papua
- Linguistic classification: Pauwasi: West Pauwasi; Tebi–Towe
- Subdivisions: Tebi; Towei

Language codes
- Glottolog: west2611

The Tebi–Towe languages, Wurm's West Pauwasi languages, are a pair of closely related languages of New Guinea, namely Tebi (Dubu) and Towei.
