= Yunus Wonda =

Indonesian politician (born 1972)

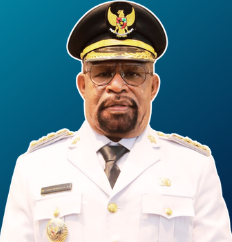
- Portrait as regent, 2025

Regent of Jayapura
- Incumbent
- Assumed office 25 March 2025
- Governor: Ramses Limbong (act.); Agus Fatoni (act.)
- Deputy: Haris Richard Yocku
- Preceded by: Mathius Awoitauw; Semuel Siriwa (pj.)

Speaker of the Papua House of Representatives
- In office December 2014 – 2019

Member of the Papua House of Representatives
- In office 9 October 2009 – 31 October 2024

Personal details
- Born: 31 May 1972 (age 54) Mulia, Irian Jaya, Indonesia
- Party: Demokrat

Yunus Wonda (born 31 May 1972) is an Indonesian politician of the Democratic Party who has served as the regent of Jayapura Regency since March 2025. He had previously been a member of the Papua House of Representatives between 2009 and 2024, serving as its speaker in 2014–2019.

== Early life ==
Yunus Wonda was born on 31 May 1972 within the district of Mulia, located within present-day Puncak Jaya Regency. He completed elementary and middle school at Sentani, in Jayapura Regency. He then studied aviation in Yogyakarta between 1990 and 1993. Later in his life, Wonda would study law, receiving bachelor's and master's degrees from Cenderawasih University in 2011, and later a doctorate from Hasanuddin University in 2017.

== Career ==
After completing flight school, Wonda began to work at Airfast Indonesia, a charter air carrier. In the 2000s, he returned to Papua to work for a local airline, but following an accident in 2002 he was temporarily paralyzed for six months.

At some point, he joined the Prosperous Peace Party, but then moved to the Democratic Party. He was elected into the Papua House of Representatives (DPRP) as a Democratic Party member in the 2009 election, and became a deputy speaker of the body. After his reelection for a second term in 2014, he was elected as speaker of DPRP in mid-December 2014. He was reelected for a third term in 2019, and again became deputy speaker. He was reelected for a fourth term in 2024 with 10,420 votes.

As DPRP speaker, Wonda criticized the Indonesian Police's decision to prohibit West Papuan independence activists from holding a protest at the DPRP building in 2016. Wonda was questioned as a witness by the Corruption Eradication Commission in January 2023 over a corruption case related to Papua's governor Lukas Enembe.

=== Regent ===
In September 2024, he resigned from his fourth term in order to run as a candidate in the regency election for Jayapura Regency in the 2024 local elections. He ran with Haris Yoku as running mate, and received an endorsement from the National Mandate Party on top of the Democratic Party. The election was a five-way race, and Wonda won the election after securing 22,386 votes (28.4%). The election results had been contested to the Constitutional Court of Indonesia, and the official result was only finalized on 27 February 2025. He was officially sworn in as regent on 25 March 2025.

== Personal life ==
Wonda's wife died during his period of paralysis in 2002. He has three children.
