= Viid language =

Papuan language of Indonesian

Senggi
- Viid, Find
- Native to: Indonesia
- Region: Papua province: Keerom Regency, Senggi District, Senggi village
- Native speakers: 250 (2005)
- Language family: Border: Senggi

Language codes
- ISO 639-3: snu
- Glottolog: seng1285
- ELP: Senggi

Senggi, or Viid, Find, is a Papuan language of Indonesian Papua. It is spoken in Senggi village, Senggi District, Keerom Regency.
