= Papeda (food) =

Indonesian sago congee dish

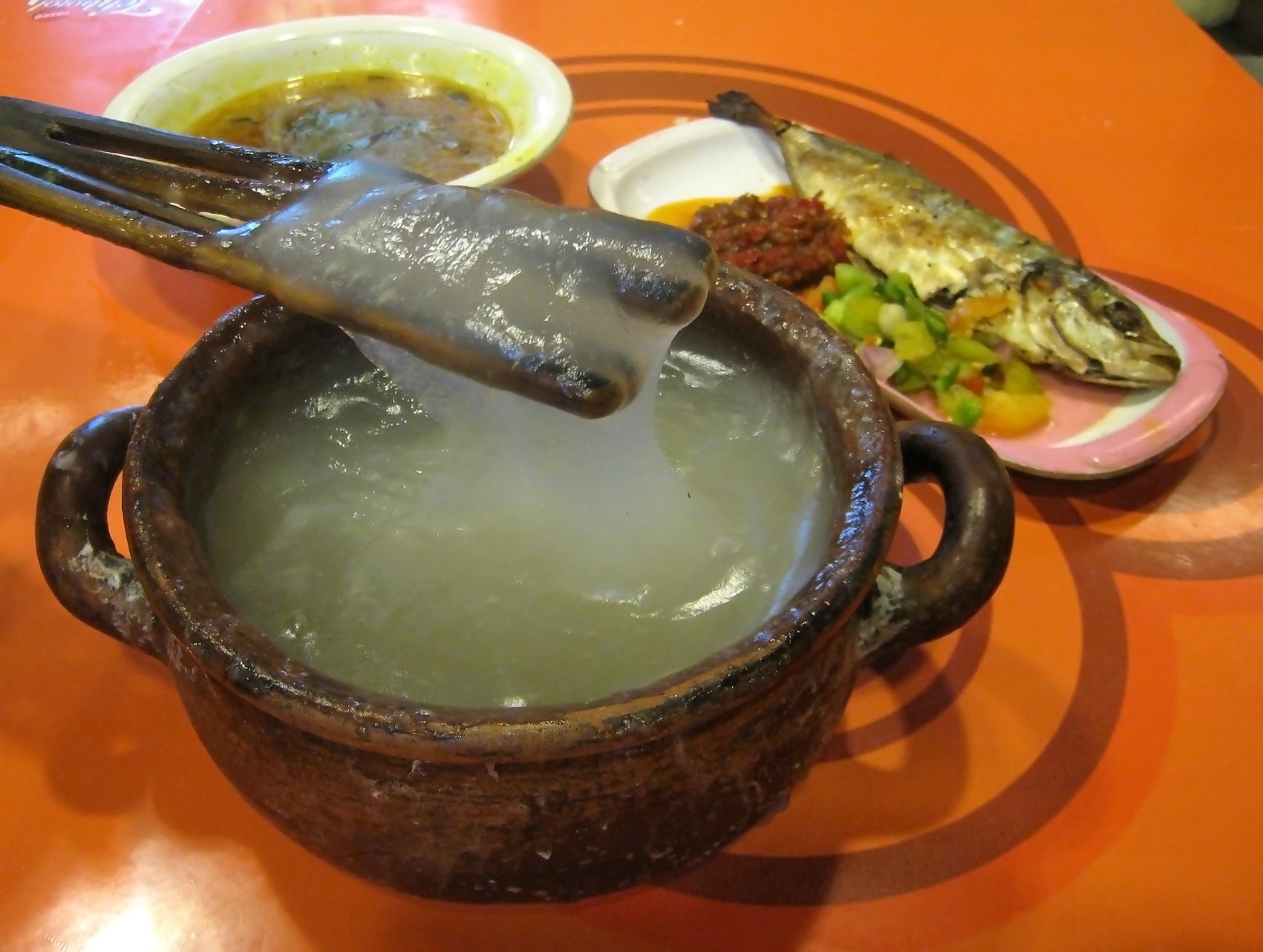
- Papeda served with yellow soup and grilled mackerel called tongkol
- Alternative names: Popeda, pepeda, bubur sagu, nangu, kapurung, sinonggi
- Course: Main course, staple food
- Place of origin: Indonesia
- Region or state: Sulawesi, Maluku and coastal Papua
- Serving temperature: Hot or room temperature
- Main ingredients: Sago

Papeda, or bubur sagu, is a type of congee made from sago starch. It is a staple food of the people indigenous to Eastern Indonesia, namely parts of Sulawesi, the Maluku Islands and coastal Papua. It is also widespread in Papua New Guinea and serves as the counterpart to central and western Indonesian cuisines that favour rice as their staple food. Papeda is of Ambon Malay origin and attested in Vocabularium ofte Woort-boeck (1623) by Dutch clergymen Caspar Wiltens and Sebastiaan Danckaerts.

The starch is acquired by felling the trunk of a sago palm tree, cutting it in half, and scraping the soft inner parts of the trunk, the pith, producing a crude sago pith flour. This flour is then mixed with water and squeezed to leach the starch from the flour. The still-moist sago starch is usually stored in a container made of sago palm leaflets, called tumang, in which it will keep for several months before spontaneous fermentation will turn it too acidic and unsuitable for making papeda. Depending on the variety and the growing conditions, it may take a sago tree five to over ten years to accumulate enough starch in its trunk to make the effort of extracting it worthwhile.

Papeda is made by cooking sago starch with water and stirring until it coagulates and becomes more translucent. It has a glue-like consistency and texture. Sayur bunga pepaya (papaya flower bud vegetables) and tumis kangkung (stir-fried water spinach) are often served as side-dish vegetables to accompany papeda.

== Locations ==
According to anthropologist Johszua Robert Mansoben, papeda is commonly found in the cuisines of Papua Province's Sentani people near Lake Sentani, Taikat people of Arso District (Keerom Regency), and Manokwari in West Papua Province. Meanwhile, in the culinary tradition of the lowlands of South Papua and Central Papua like Mappi, Asmat, Mimika, and Merauke, sago is processed differently; it may be made into sagu bakar, sagu lempeng, sagu sef, and sagu bola.

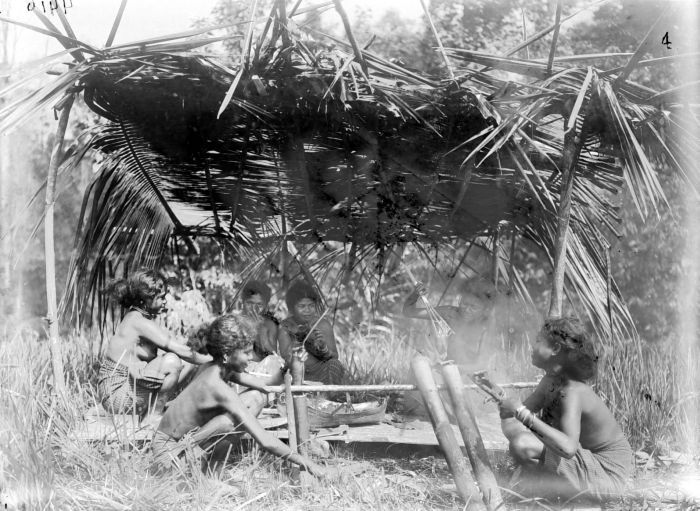
Alifuru people of Seram island in Maluku cooking papeda in bamboo

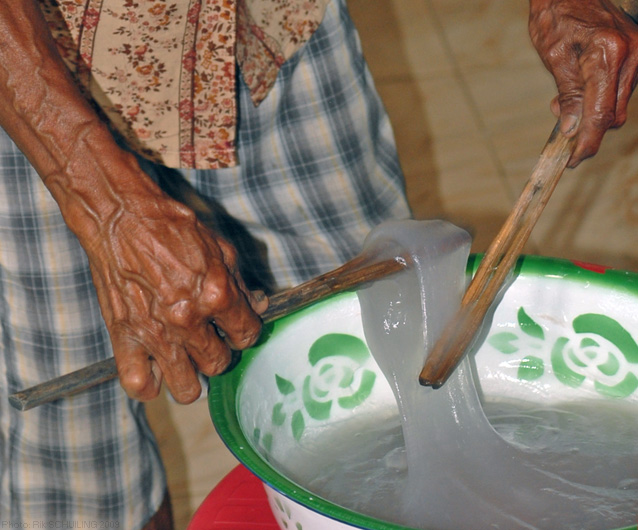
Using a special wooden fork called a gata-gata to separate a serving from a bowl of papeda in West Seram, Maluku, Indonesia

In southern Sulawesi mainly Luwu and Tana Toraja, Kapurung is made from cooked sago congee which is picked up using chopsticks or fork and rolled into a ball. Usually it is served with beans, vegetable and fish in a soup. While in Southeast Sulawesi, specifically from Tolaki tribe, Sinonggi, sago congee is served separately from the side dishes more akin to Papeda. It needs to be picked up by specially designed wooden sticks.

There are similar dishes in Malaysia, where it is called linut, part of the Bruneian Malay, Bisaya, Lundayeh/Lun Bawang, Bajau and Kadazan-Dusun cuisine in the East Malaysia states of Sabah and Melanau in Sarawak, and in Brunei, where it is called ambuyat.

== Menu variations ==
In general, papeda is consumed with mackerel and fish broth, but it can be replaced with red snapper, tuna, or cork fish. Most of these fishes are spiced with turmeric and lime, giving a distinctive yellow color on the broth. Papeda is sometimes also consumed with boiled starchy tubers, such as those of cassava or yam. Besides yellow broth and fish, papeda can be served with sayur ganemo, which is made from young melinjo leaves, stir-fried papaya flowers and red chilies.

== See also ==
- Ambuyat, a similar Bruneian and Malaysian dish
- List of porridges
- Kissel
