= Heram =

- District
- Interactive map of Heram
- Country: Indonesia
- Province: Papua
- City: Jayapura

Heram is a district in Jayapura City, Papua, Indonesia.

== Description ==
Heram District, located in the western part of Jayapura City and borders the area around Lake Sentani, one of the largest lakes in Papua located below the slopes of the Cyclops Nature Reserve Mountains, between Jayapura City and Jayapura Regency. This district is the center of education in Jayapura City, because this is where Cenderawasih University (UNCEN), the largest state university in Papua, stands. The presence of UNCEN attracts many students and immigrants to Heram, so that this area is filled with various schools and other educational facilities.

Economic life in Heram district is quite dynamic, supported by small trade, education, and public service sectors. In addition, Heram also has health facilities in the form of community health centers (puskesmas) to meet the medical needs of the local community.

In terms of transportation, this district has good road access because it is located on the main route to the center of Jayapura City. Heram is the main gate of Jayapura City from Sentani Airport direction Jayapura Regency. Public transportation and motorcycle taxis are the main choices for mobility of residents, especially students who often travel to campus or other places around Jayapura.

Heram has a diverse social life, driven by the presence of students from various regions in Papua. This creates a multicultural atmosphere in this district, although the local community still maintains their culture and traditions. In addition to being known as an educational center, Heram also has an attractive natural charm, with hills and green scenery that are often used as recreation places for locals and visitors.

Overall, Heram is a continuously developing area with educational, small economic and social activities, making it an important part in supporting the activities of the Jayapura City community.
