= Namla language =

Language in Indonesia

Namla
- Region: Papua: Keerom Regency, Senggi District, Namla village
- Native speakers: 30 (2005)
- Language family: Pauwasi: West Pauwasi; Namla–Tofanma; Namla

Language codes
- ISO 639-3: naa
- Glottolog: naml1240
- ELP: Namla

Namla is a poorly documented Papuan language of Indonesia. It appears to be related to Tofanma, a neighboring language. It is spoken in Namla village, Senggi District, Keerom Regency.

Namla is close to extinction due to its being replaced by Tofanma and possibly also Papuan Malay.

== Phonology ==
Consonants
	Labial	Alveolar	Palatal	Dorsal
Plosive	p b	t d	ɟ	k g
Fricative	f	s		h
Nasal	m	n	ɲ	ŋ
Approximant	w	r, l	j	

Vowels
	Front	Central	Back
High	i		u
Mid	e	ə	o
Low		a	

== Vocabulary ==
Namla vocabulary from Foley (2018):

gloss	Namla
‘bird’	atu
‘blood’	ləke
‘bone’	da
‘breast’	momu
‘ear’	wuronodake
‘eat’	sa
‘egg’	le
‘eye’	lɪle
‘fire’	wo
‘give’	væn
‘go’	wo
‘ground’	jao
‘hair’	kəmbrada
‘hear’	wara
‘I’	na
‘leg’	buda
‘louse’	ble
‘man’	lamokra
‘moon’	pei
‘name’	ei
‘one’	knonu
‘road, path’	mitu
‘see’	mesa
‘sky’	nəmləu
‘stone’	sou
‘sun’	nəmane
‘tongue’	kagoku
‘tooth’	dəmda
‘tree’	ra
‘two’	nene
‘water’	nomu
‘we’	mani
‘woman’	ara
‘you (sg)’	wu(giknoko)
‘you (pl)’	yuka
