= Bruneian cuisine =

Culinary traditions of Brunei

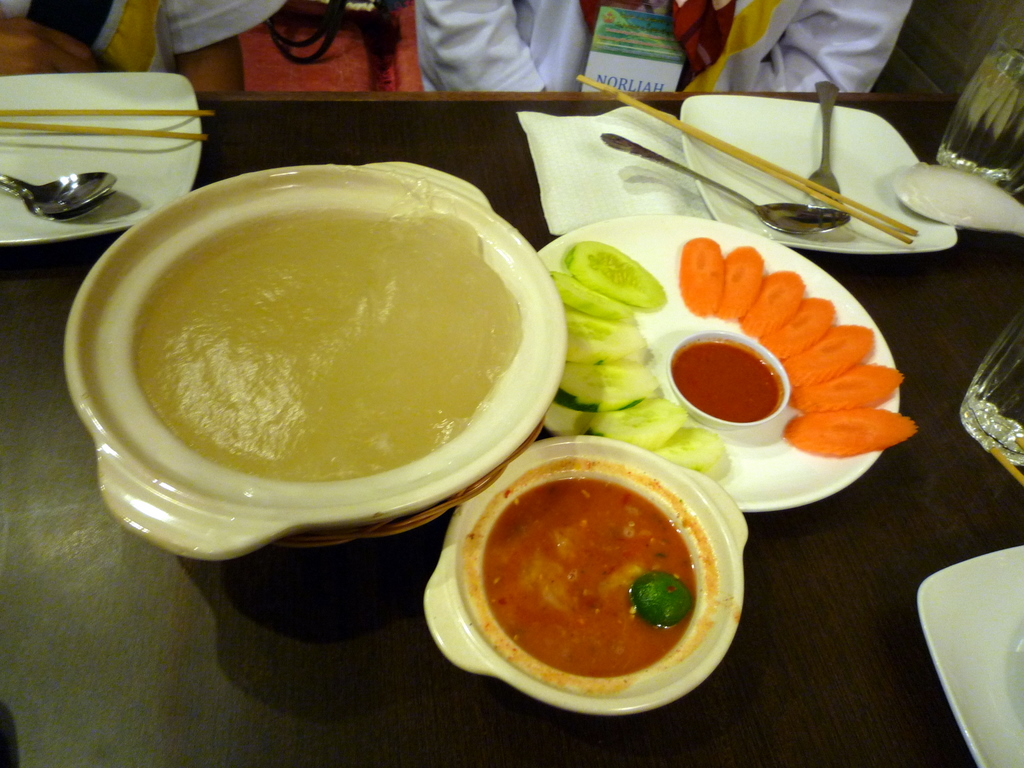
Ambuyat, the national dish of Brunei.

Bruneian cuisine concerns the cuisine of Brunei. It is similar to, and heavily influenced by the cuisine of neighbouring Malaysia, Singapore, and Indonesia, with additional influences from India, China, Thailand, and the Middle East. As is common in the region, fish and rice are staple foods, although beef is expensive and therefore less common. Due to the predominance of Islam, the food is halal and pork is avoided. Alcohol is banned in Brunei. In rural areas, game animals such as wild birds, sambar deer, and barking deer are hunted.

== Foods and dishes ==
Dishes from Brunei are often spicy and are commonly eaten with either rice or noodles. Nasi katok, beef rendang, nasi lemak, and pajeri nanas are popular foods in Brunei. Among the few dishes peculiar to Brunei is ambuyat, a sticky ball of flavourless sago starch, which is wrapped around a bamboo fork and dipped into a spicy and sour gravy. Nasi katok, which literally means 'knock rice', consists of plain rice, fried chicken and sambal, a spicy relish made from ground chilli peppers and a variety of secondary ingredients, including shrimp paste, garlic, ginger, shallot, spring onion, palm sugar, lime juice, vinegar and anchovies. Traditionally, nasi katok is served and wrapped in brown paper.

== Beverages ==
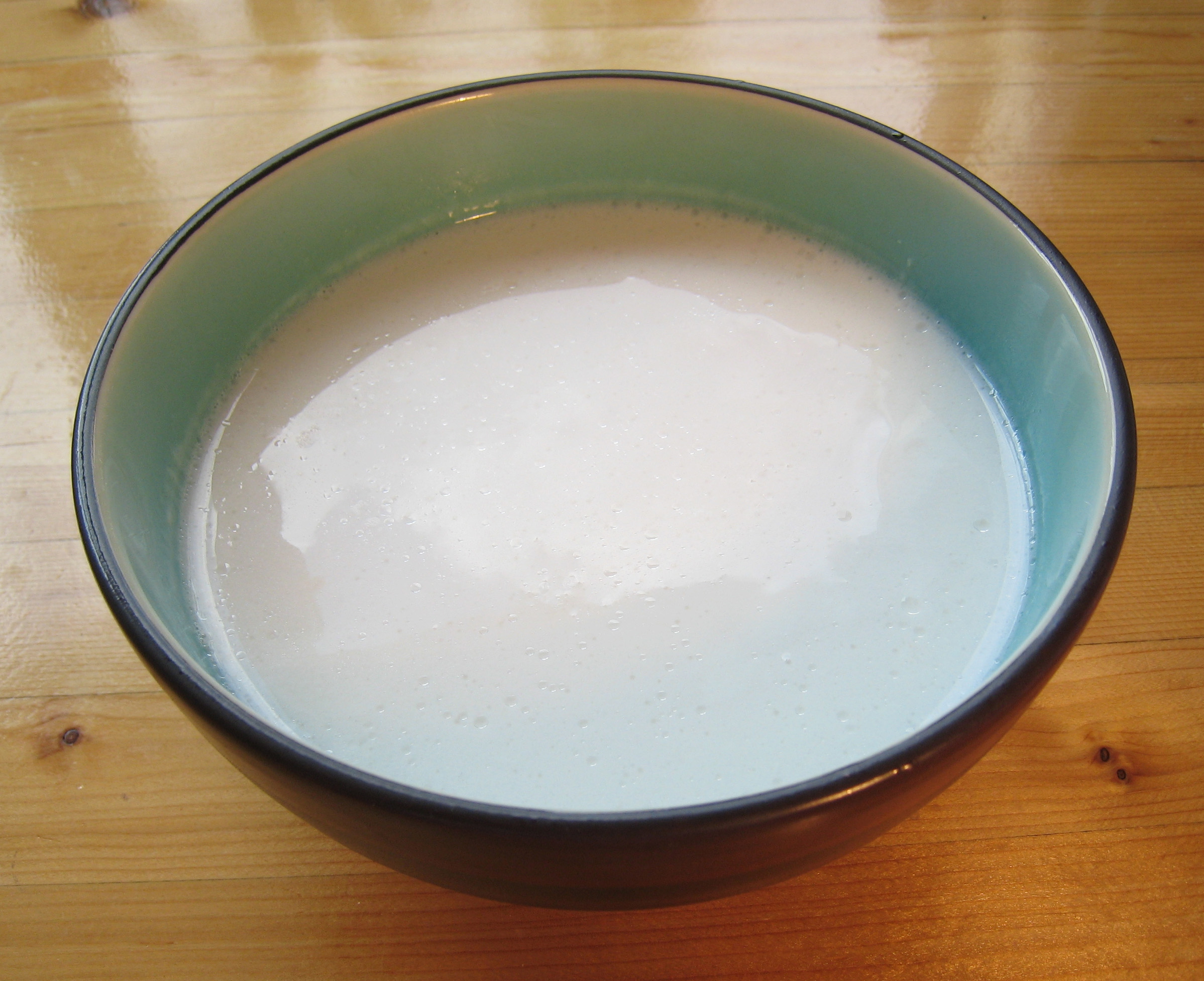
Coconut milk

Common drinks include coconut milk, fruit juice, tea, milk tea and coffee.
