= Ambuyat =

National dish of Brunei

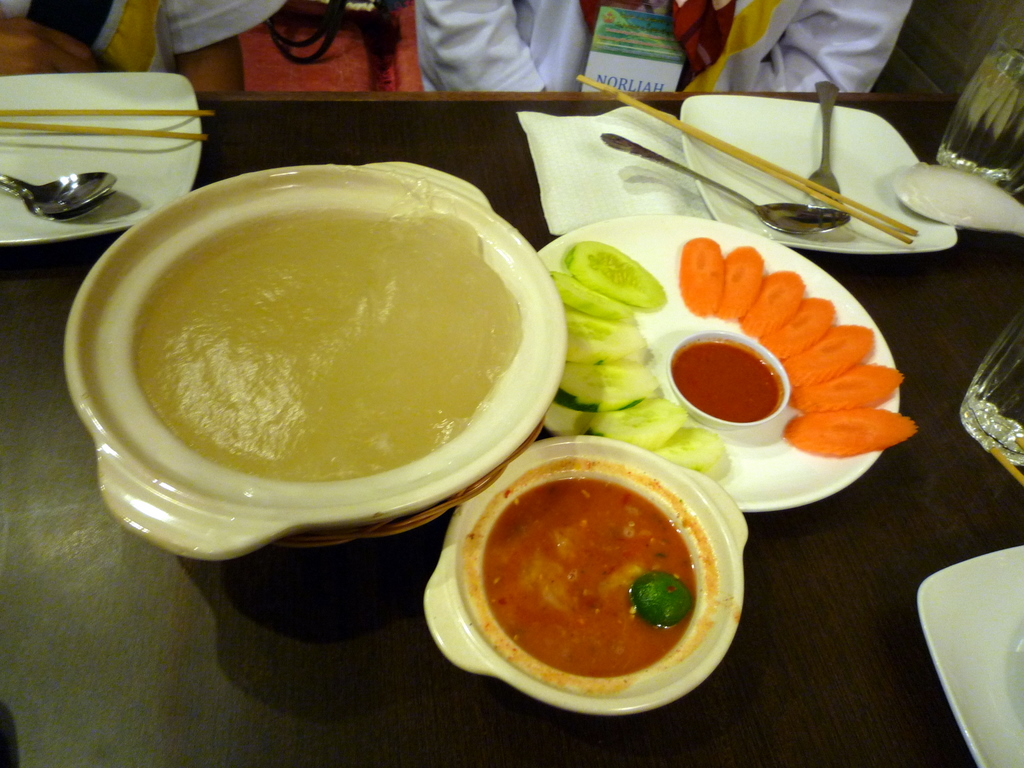
- Ambuyat served in Bandar Seri Begawan, Brunei
- Alternative names: Linut; pinantung
- Type: Dish; staple food
- Place of origin: Brunei
- Region or state: Brunei and East Malaysia (Sarawak, Labuan, Sabah)
- Created by: Bruneian Malays; Bisaya; Lundayeh/Lun Bawang; Bajau; Kadazan-Dusun
- Main ingredients: Sago
- Food energy (per serving): 842

Ambuyat is a dish derived from the interior trunk of the sago palm. It is a starchy, bland substance similar to tapioca. Ambuyat is the national dish of Brunei, and it is also popular in the Malaysian states of Sarawak and Sabah as well as the federal territory of Labuan, where it is sometimes known as linut or pinantung.

== Background ==
Ambuyat is the traditional food of the Bruneian Malay, Bisaya, Bajau, Kadazan-Dusun, and Lundayeh/Lun Bawang people in both the Interior Division and West Coast Division of Sabah and the Limbang Division of Sarawak, as well as the Malaysian federal territory of Labuan and the sultanate of Brunei, where it is considered the national dish.

Ambuyat is eaten with a linked pair of bamboo chopsticks called chandas, by rolling the starch around the prongs and then dipping it into a sauce, of which there are many varieties, including shrimp paste (sambal belacan), sambal tempoyak (chilli and fermented durian paste), sambal cincalok (chilli and fermented shrimp paste), and sambal binjai (a type of wild mango). In the past, it was a dietary staple for the indigenous people of the region.

In parts of Eastern Indonesia, there is a similar dish called papeda, which is usually served with stir-fried water spinach (kangkung), papaya flower buds, and a turmeric-tinged fish curry called kuah ikan kuning, flavoured with green chillies, lemongrass, and bay leaves.

== See also ==
- Bruneian cuisine
- Malay cuisine
- Malaysian cuisine
- Indonesian cuisine
