= West Pauwasi languages =

Papuan language family

West Pauwasi
- West Pauwasi River
- Geographic distribution: Western New Guinea
- Linguistic classification: Pauwasi: West Pauwasi
- Subdivisions: Tebi–Towei; Namla–Tofanma; Usku

Language codes
- Glottolog: None

The West Pauwasi languages are a likely family of Papuan languages spoken on the Indonesian side of New Guinea. They may either form part of a larger Pauwasi language family along with the Eastern Pauwasi languages, or it they could form an independent language family (or more than one family).

== Languages ==
The languages are,

- Tebi–Towe (Wurm's West Pauwasi)
  - Tebi (Dubu)
  - Towei
- Namla–Tofanma
  - Namla
  - Tofanma
- Usku (Afra)

The three branches differ substantially from each other.
