= Tebi language =

Language in Papua

Tebi
- Tepi-Dubu
- Native to: Indonesia
- Region: New Guinea
- Native speakers: 220 (2005)
- Language family: Pauwasi: West Pauwasi; Tebi–Towe; Tebi

Language codes
- ISO 639-3: dmu
- Glottolog: dubu1240
- ELP: Dubu

Tebi, also known by the village name Dubu, is a Western Pauwasi language of West New Guinea. It is spoken in Affi, Dubu, and Jembatan Web villages of Keerom Regency. It is mostly used by older adults.

A survey report has been carried out by Im (2005).

== Basic vocabulary ==
Below are some basic vocabulary words in Tebi.

Tebi basic vocabulary
‘I’	na
‘you (sg)’	fro
‘we’	numu
‘belly’	dialə
‘bird’	olmu
‘black’	təŋəra
‘blood’	təri
‘breast’	mamu
‘come’	kəlawai
‘eat’	ne
‘eye’	ei
‘foot’	puŋwa
‘give’	taʔa
‘good’	pani
‘hand’	təro
‘head’	məndini
‘hear’	fei
‘house’	
‘louse’	mi
‘man’	toŋkwar
‘mosquito’	mimi
‘name’	kini
‘road’	fiaʔa
‘root’	periŋgu
‘sand’	tədən
‘tooth’	kle
‘tree’	weyalgi
‘water’	ai
‘who’	mate
‘one’	kərowali
‘two’	kre
