= Mulia, Puncak Jaya =

Mulia
- District
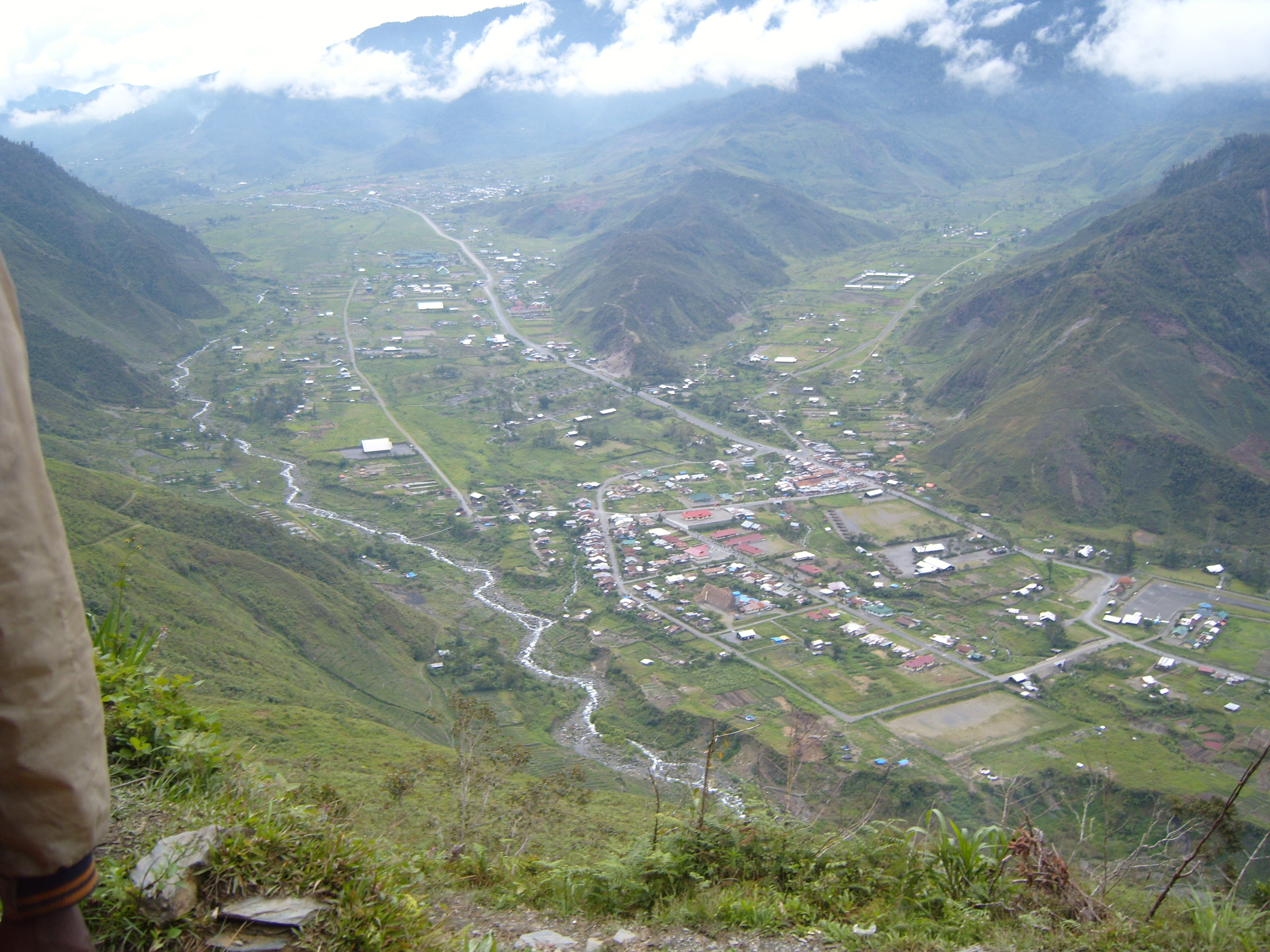
- Mulia in 2007

- Location in Central Papua Location in Indonesian Papua Location in Indonesia
- Coordinates: 3.716201°S 137.984739°E
- Country: Indonesia
- Province: Central Papua
- Regency: Puncak Jaya Regency

Government
  - District head (Camat): Tekiles Wonda

Area
  - Total: 268.00 km^{2} (103.48 sq mi)

Population (2021)
  - Total: 35,884

Mulia, also known as Kota Mulia (lit. 'Town of Mulia'), is a district that serves as the capital of Puncak Jaya Regency in the province of Central Papua, Indonesia. Mulia is the coldest town or regency capital in Indonesia, located at an elevation of 2,448 meters above sea level. Mulia is the only inhabited area at such a high altitude that is surrounded by the Sudirman Range or Puncak Jaya Mountains.

== Geography ==
Mulia is an inhabited area in Indonesia situated at a high altitude, surrounded by the Sudirman Range or Puncak Jaya Mountains. Puncak Jaya is Indonesia's highest peak, reaching an altitude of 4,884 meters above sea level. The daytime temperature in Mulia can reach 15 degrees Celsius, while at night, it can drop to 9 degrees Celsius.

== Housing ==
Rainfall in Mulia occurs almost throughout the year. Most residents in Mulia live in honai, a warm traditional Papuan house without windows that prevent cold air from easily entering the home, especially at night. Meanwhile, cement-walled buildings are typically used for office buildings such as village offices, community health centers, schools, and other social services.

== Demographics ==
=== Population ===
In 2021, the population of Mulia district was 35,884, with a density of 1,435 people per square kilometer. The indigenous ethnic groups in Puncak Jaya are the Lani, Damal, Dauwa, Wano, Nduga, and Turu. Additionally, there are also several migrants from other regions in Indonesia.

=== Religion ===
According to data from the Ministry of Home Affairs the Civil Registration (DUKCAPIL), in 2021, most of the population in Mulia district were Christians. The religious composition of Mulia district is as follows: 95.19% Christianity, with 93.09% being Protestantism and 2.10% Catholicism. A smaller portion of the population follows Islam (4.79%), while Hinduism and Buddhism each account for 0.01%.

== Transportation ==
In Mulia, there is a small airport called Mulia Airport, which accommodates small-sized aircraft. These aircraft provide pioneer flights to Jayapura with a travel time of approximately one hour.
