= Yapen languages =

Yapen languages may refer to either of the following language groups of Yapen Island in Indonesian Papua:

- Yapen languages (Austronesian), a branch of the Austronesian language family
- Yapen languages (Papuan), also known as Yawa languages, an unclassified small language family
