= Towei language =

Language in Western New Guinea

Towei
- Native to: Indonesia
- Region: Western New Guinea: Towe Hitam village, Towe District, Pegunungan Bintang Regency
- Native speakers: (200 cited 1975)
- Language family: Pauwasi: West Pauwasi; Tebi–Towe; Towei

Language codes
- ISO 639-3: ttn
- Glottolog: towe1240
- ELP: Towei

Towei (Towe) is a Western Pauwasi language of West New Guinea. It is spoken in Towe Hitam village, Towe District, Pegunungan Bintang Regency.
