= Senggi District =

District of Papua, Indonesia

Senggi
- District
- Interactive map of Senggi
- Country: Indonesia
- Region: Western New Guinea
- Province: (Papua (province)) Papua
- Regency: Keerom Regency
- Time zone: UTC+9 (Indonesia Eastern Time)
- Climate: Af

Senggi District is a district in Keerom Regency, Papua, Indonesia.

== Villages ==
As of 2018, Senggi consists of 7 administrative villages (kampung). The indigenous Papuan languages spoken in each village are also listed below.

- Elseng (Elseng language speakers)
- Senggi (Viid language speakers)
- Warlef (Zorop language speakers)
- Woslay
- Usku (Usku language speakers)
- Waley
- Namla (Namla language speakers)
