= Jayapura Regency =

Regency in Papua, Indonesia

Jayapura Regency Kabupaten Jayapura
- Regency
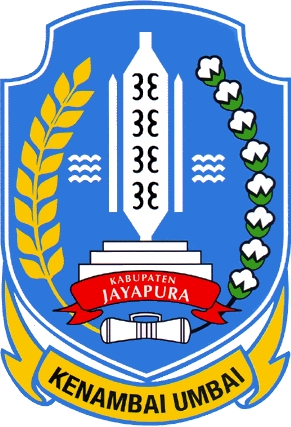
- Coat of arms
- Motto(s): Kenambai Umbai Reimay (United to Work Faithfully Towards Glory)
- Location in Papua Province

- Location in Indonesian Papua Location in Indonesia
- Coordinates: 3.0000°S 139.9500°E
- Country: Indonesia
- Province: Papua
- Capital: Sentani

Government
  - Regent: Yunus Wonda
  - Vice Regent: Haris Richard Yocku

Area
  - Total: 17,516.6 km^{2} (6,763.2 sq mi)

Population (mid 2024 estimate)
  - Total: 203,772
  - Density: 11.6331/km^{2} (30.1295/sq mi)
- Time zone: UTC+9 (Indonesia Eastern Time)
- Area code: (+62) 967
- Website: jayapurakab.go.id

Jayapura Regency is one of the regencies (kabupaten) in Papua Province of Indonesia. It is situated to the west of but does not include the city of Jayapura. Previously covering most of the north-east portion of Papua province, it was reduced substantially in extent from 12 November 2002, when the eastern districts were split off to form a new Keerom Regency and the western districts were split off to form a new Sarmi Regency. It now covers an area of 17,516.6 km^{2} (but see Note (h) under table below), and had a population of 111,943 at the 2010 Census and 166,171 at the 2020 Census; the official estimate as of mid-2024 was 203,772 (comprising 105,242 males and 98,530 females). The administrative centre is the town of Sentani, which had 26,518 inhabitants in mid 2024 in the 20.56^{2} of its town (kelurahan) area.

== Administrative districts ==
Following the 2002 reductions in area, the existing regency comprises nineteen districts (distrik), tabulated below with their areas and their populations at the 2010 Census and the 2020 Census, together with the official estimates as of mid-2024. The twelve districts listed below from Kaureh to Yokari represent the inland part of the regency, in the west and south (although Demta and Yokari Districts are on the coast), while the seven districts listed below from Depapre to Sentani Timur represent the coastal part of the regency and the area including Lake Sentani and the Cyclops Mountains in the more densely-populated northeast. The table also includes the locations of the district administrative centres, the number of administrative villages in each district (totaling 139 rural kampung and 5 urban kelurahan), and its post code.

| Kode Wilayah | Name of District (distrik) | Area in km^{2} | Pop'n 2010 Census | Pop'n 2020 Census | Pop'n mid 2024 Estimate | Admin centre | No. of villages | Post code |
|---|---|---|---|---|---|---|---|---|
| 91.03.11 | Kaureh | 4,357.9 | 6,165 | 9,517 | 12,694 | Lapua | 5 | 99364 |
| 91.03.16 | Airu | 3,099.0 | 897 | 1,104 | 1,755 | Hulu Atas | 6 | 99363 |
| 91.03.15 | Yapsi | 1,291.3 | 5,709 | 6,646 | 8,025 | Bumi Sahaja | 9 | 99365 |
| 91.03.05 | Kemtuk | 258.3 | 3,525 | 4,440 | 5,404 | Sama | 12 | 99366 |
| 91.03.06 | Kemtuk Gresi | 182.4 | 4,035 | 4,822 | 5,713 | Hatib | 12 ^{(a)} | 99367 |
| 91.03.18 | Gresi Selatan (South Gresi) | 143.9 | 885 | 1,223 | 1,528 | Bangai | 4 | 99357 |
| 91.03.07 | Nimboran | 710.2 | 4,004 | 4,616 | 5,585 | Tabri | 14 ^{(a)} | 99361 |
| 91.03.14 | Nambluong ^{(b)} | 193.7 | 2,956 | 3,577 | 4,133 | Karya Bumi | 9 | 99360 |
| 91.03.08 | Nimbokrang | 774.8 | 6,323 | 7,109 | 8,247 | Nembukrang | 9 | 99362 |
| 91.03.09 | Unurum Guay | 3,131.3 | 1,929 | 3,003 | 3,892 | Garusa | 6 | 99356 |
| 91.03.10 | Demta ^{(c)} | 497.5 | 3,126 | 3,427 | 4,128 | Demta | 7 | 99354 |
| 91.03.19 | Yokari ^{(d)} | 519.5 | 1,877 | 2,240 | 2,883 | Meukisi | 5 | 99355 |
| Sub-totals | West and South region | 15,159.8 | 41,431 | 51,724 | 63,987 | | 98 | |
| 91.03.03 | Depapre ^{(e)} | 404.3 | 3,784 | 5,097 | 5,772 | Waiya | 8 | 99353 |
| 91.03.17 | Ravenirara ^{(f)} | 467.4 | 1,103 | 1,350 | 1,786 | Nehibe | 4 | 99350 |
| 91.03.04 | Sentani Barat (West Sentani) | 129.2 | 4,148 | 5,631 | 6,705 | Dosay | 5 | 99358 |
| 91.03.13 | Waibu | 258.3 | 6,973 | 18,500 | 26,047 | Doyo Lama | 7 | 99368 |
| 91.03.01 | Sentani | 225.9 | 44,779 | 71,174 | 84,599 | Hinekombe | 10 ^{(g)} | 99352 |
| 91.03.12 | Ebungfao | 387.4 | 2,443 | 3,030 | 3,814 | Ebungfa | 5 | 99351 |
| 91.03.02 | Sentani Timur (East Sentani) | 484.3 | 7,282 | 9,665 | 11,062 | Nolokla | 7 | 99359 |
| Sub-totals | Lake Sentani region | 2,356.8 | 70,512 | 114,447 | 139,785 | | 46 | |
| | Totals ^{(h)} | 17,516.6 | 111,943 | 166,171 | 203,772 | Sentani | 144 | |

Notes: (a) including one kelurahan (the district centre). (b) formerly Nimboran Timur (East Nimboran).
(c) including 9 offshore islands, including Arer, Misrow, Pane, Pan Barat, Pane Tengah, Pane Timur and Pane Ujung. (d) including 6 offshore islands, including Anai and Daido.
(e) including 4 offshore islands, comprising Ku, Ounangko, Sensau and Temangtemang. (f) including 3 offshore islands, comprising Ajakua, Ajava and Inji.
(g) including 3 kelurahan - Sentani Kota (town), Dobonsolo and Hinekombe, which together form a single urban area with 69,045 inhabitants in mid 2024.
(h) the differing parts of BPS (Indonesia's national statistics agency) have published widely different figures for the official area and mid-2024 estimated population for Jayapura Regency. The provincial-level of BPS gives an area of 14,082.21 km^{2} and a population of 171,670, while the regency-level of BPS gives an area of 17,516.6 km^{2} and a population of 203,772.

== Tourism ==
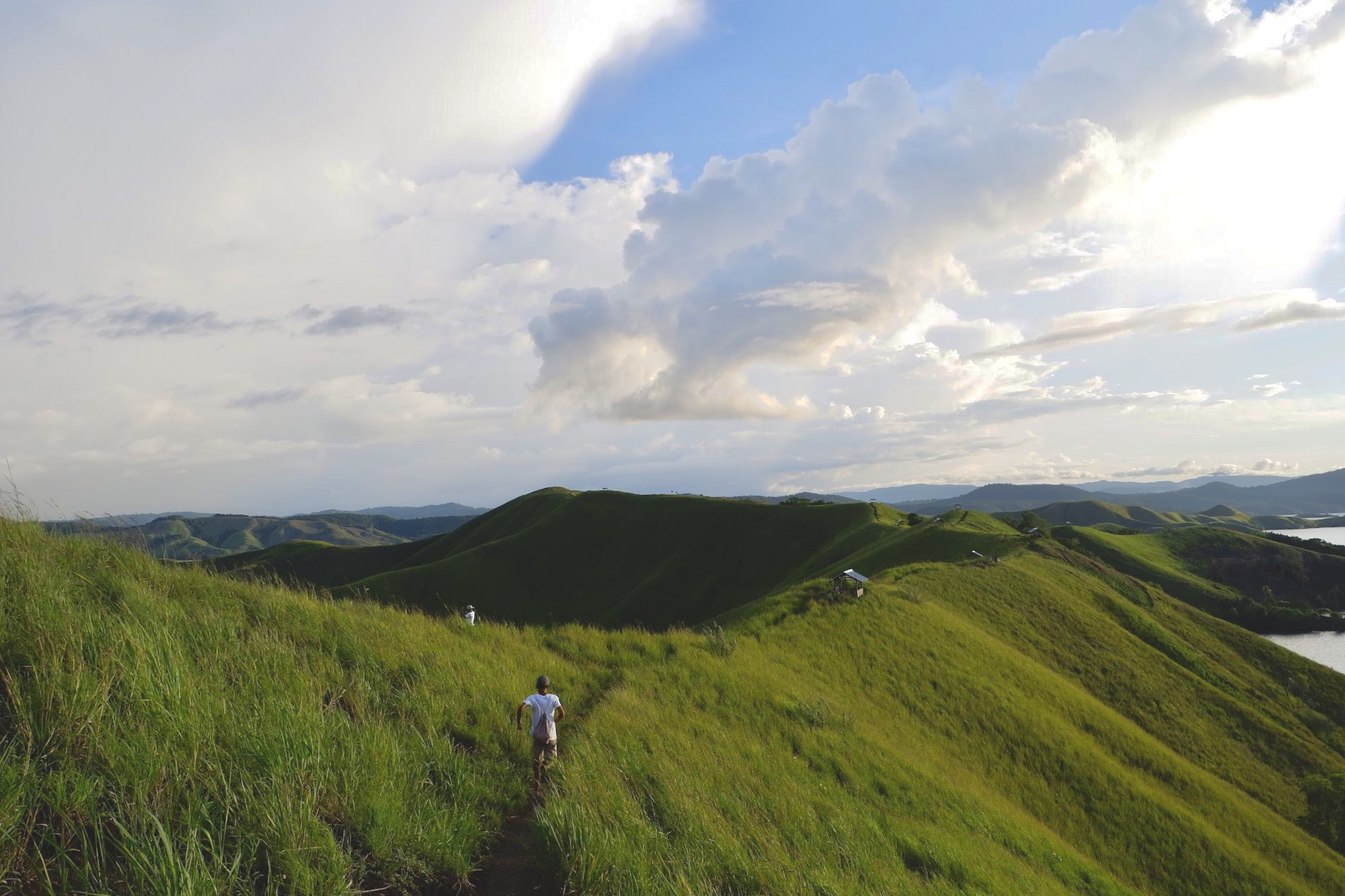
Tungku Wiri hill in Waibu district, popularly known as "Teletubbies Hill" (Bukit Teletubbies)

Since end of 2014, Infote (also called Love Lake, Danau Love, Telaga Love, or Telaga Hati) has become popular as a tourist attraction. Named for its shape, the Love Lake lays in Central Sentani, which can be accessed from Keerom Regency or from Jayapura through Yoka Village.

== Sport ==
As the 2021 edition of National Sports Week (PON) is hosted in Papua Province, Jayapura Regency is selected as one of the games venues. Lukas Enembe Stadium in Sentani Timur District was built as the 2021 PON main venue.
