= Keerom Regency =

Regency in Papua, Indonesia

Keerom Regency Kabupaten Keerom
- Regency
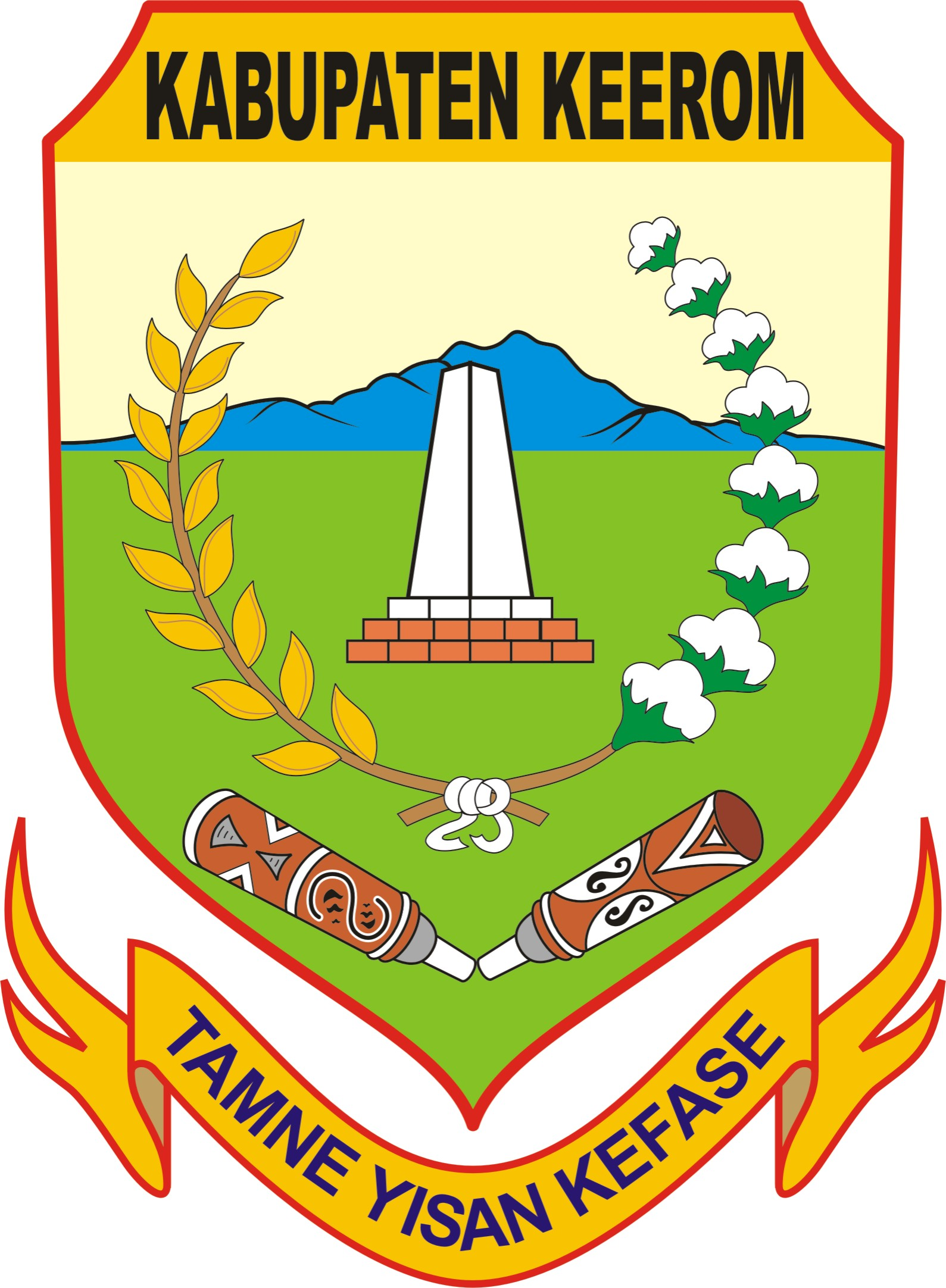
- Coat of arms
- Motto(s): Tamne Yisan Kefase (Unite to Build)
- Location in Papua Province

- Location in Indonesian Papua Location in Indonesia
- Coordinates: 3.3000°S 140.6167°E
- Country: Indonesia
- Province: Papua
- Capital: Waris

Government
  - Regent: Piter Gusbager
  - Vice Regent: Wahfir Kosasih

Area
  - Total: 9,365 km^{2} (3,616 sq mi)

Population (mid 2024 estimate)
  - Total: 74,332
  - Density: 7.937/km^{2} (20.56/sq mi)
- Time zone: UTC+9 (Indonesia Eastern Time)
- Area code: (+62) 971
- Website: www.keeromkab.go.id

Keerom Regency is one of the regencies (kabupaten) in the Papua Province of Indonesia. It was formed from the eastern districts then within Jayapura Regency with effect from 12 November 2002, and is thus the most eastern of the regencies within the province of Papua, bordering with the nation of Papua New Guinea to the east. It covers an area of 9,365 km^{2}, and had a population of 48,536 at the 2010 Census and 61,623 at the 2020 Census; the official estimate as of mid-2024 was 74,332 (comprising 39,105 males and 35,227 females). The regency's administrative centre is at the town of Waris.

Keerom Regency is located in the border area between Indonesia and Papua New Guinea, in Papua Province. It borders Green River Rural LLG and Amanab Rural LLG of Sandaun Province (in Papua New Guinea) to the east, Highland Papua Province to the south and Jayapura Regency to the west, while to the north it is separated from the coast by Muara Tami and Abepura Districts of the city of Jayapura (Muara Tami District provides the outlet to the Pacific Ocean of the rivers originating in Keerom Regency).

== Languages ==
Border languages (Awyi, Waris, Manem, Sowanda), Pauwasi languages (Emem, Zorop, Tebi), Namla-Tofanma languages, Dera, Elseng, and Usku are the local indigenous Papuan languages spoken in Keerom Regency.

== Administrative districts ==
As of 2010, the Keerom regency comprised seven districts (distrik), but another four districts (Yaffi, Kaisenar, Arso Barat and Mannem) were added subsequently by splitting of existing districts. These eleven districts are tabulated below with their areas and their populations at the 2010 Census and the 2020 Census, together with the official estimates as of mid-2024. The table also includes the location of the district administrative centres, the number of administrative villages (all classed as rural kampung) in each district, and its post code. Note that geographically the first five districts listed below comprise the relatively underpopulated southern half of the regency (with only 8,321 inhabitants in 2024), while the remaining six districts comprise the northern half (with 66,011 inhabitants).

Kode Wilayah	Name of District (distrik)	Area in km^{2}	Pop'n 2010 Census	Pop'n 2020 Census	Pop'n mid 2024 Estimate	Admin centre	No. of villages	Post code
91.11.04	Web ^{(a)}	714.43	2,440	1,483	1,657	Umuaf	6	99462
91.11.07	Towe ^{(a)}	711.75	2,340	896	1,073	Towe Hitam	10	99466
91.11.10	Yaffi ^{(a)}	481.43	^{(b)}	1,201	2,193	Yabanda	7	99463
91.11.03	Senggi	2,538.00	2,737	2,695	2,978	Senggi	7	99464
91.11.11	Kaisenar	405.45	^{(b)}	350	420	Kaisenar	5	99465
91.11.01	Waris ^{(a)}	911.94	3,052	3,425	4,425	Pund	8	99467
91.11.02	Arso	1,381.43	20,214	15,190	19,371	Arso Kota	12	99471
91.11.06	Arso Timur ^{(a)} (East Arso)	340.48	4,766	3,163	5,094	Yetty	9	99472
91.11.08	Arso Barat (West Arso)	215.08	^{(b)}	11,823	13,796	Sanggaria	8	99473
91.11.09	Mannem	160.36	^{(b)}	4,397	4,617	Wonorejo	7	99468
91.11.05	Skanto	1,504.65	12,987	17,000	18,708	Jaifuri	12	99469
	Totals	9,365.00	48,536	61,623	74,332	Waris	91	

Notes: (a) Web, Towe, Yaffi, Waris, and Arso Timur districts have land borders with Papua New Guinea.
(b) the 2010 population for this district is included in the figure for the district from which the new district was cut out.
