= Papua (province) =

Province in Western New Guinea, Indonesia

Papua Mamberamo – Tabi – Saireri
- Province with special status
- Province of Papua; Provinsi Papua
- Coat of arms
- Nickname: Bumi Cenderawasih "Land of Paradisaea"
- Motto: Karya Swadaya (Sanskrit) "Work with one's own might"
- Papua in Indonesia
- Interactive map of Papua
- Coordinates (Jayapura): 2°32′S 140°43′E
- Country: Indonesia
- Region: Western New Guinea (Eastern Indonesia)
- Establishment: 27 December 1949
- Indonesian administration: 1 May 1963
- Latest partition: 30 June 2022
- Capital and largest city: Jayapura
- Divisions: 8 regencies and 1 city

Government
  - Body: Papua Provincial Government; Papua People's Assembly (MRP) (customs)
  - Governor: Mathius D. Fakhiri (Golkar)
  - Vice Governor: Aryoko Rumaropen
  - Legislature: Papua House of Representatives (DPRP)

Area
  - Total: 81,383.30 km^{2} (31,422.27 sq mi)
  - Rank: 7th in Indonesia

Population (mid 2025 estimation)
  - Total: 1,073,640
  - Density: 13.1924/km^{2} (34.1681/sq mi)

Demographics
  - Ethnic groups (2010): 76.32% Indigenous Papuans; 8.39% Javanese; 8% Sulawesians; 2.97% Moluccans; 3.85% others
  - Religion (2024): Christianity (85.25%); Islam (14.6%); Hinduism (0.07%); Buddhism (0.05%) other (0.07%)
  - Languages: Indonesian (official), Papuan Malay (lingua franca), Biak, Yapen, Waropen, Tobati and others (regional)
- Time zone: UTC+09:00 (Indonesia Eastern Time)
- ISO 3166 code: ID-PA
- Vehicle registration: PA
- HDI (2024): ▲0.738 (22nd) – high
- Website: papua.go.id

Papua, formerly known as West Irian and Irian Jaya, is a province of Indonesia, comprising the northern coast of Western New Guinea together with island groups in Cenderawasih Bay to the west. It roughly follows the borders of the Papuan customary region of Mamta – Saireri and is divided into eight regencies (kabupaten) and one city (kota), the latter being the provincial capital of Jayapura.

It is bordered by the nation of Papua New Guinea to the east, the Pacific Ocean to the north, Cenderawasih Bay to the west, and the provinces of Central Papua and Highland Papua to the south. The province also shares maritime boundaries with Palau in the Pacific. Papua, along with the five other Papuan provinces, has a higher degree of autonomy compared to other Indonesian provinces.

Before 2003, the province (known as Irian Barat from 1963 to 1973 and Irian Jaya from 1973 to 2002) covered the entirety of Western New Guinea, a region also known as "Papua". In 2002, Papua adopted its current name and was granted a special autonomous status under Indonesian legislation. In 2001, the western end of the province was split off into a new province of West Papua, and in July 2022 the provinces of Central Papua, Highland Papua, and South Papua were also split off, leaving the current province covering a much smaller northern area around Jayapura, the northern part of the former province, and the islands in the Cenderawasih Bay.

The official estimate of the population in mid-2025 of the province within its current borders was 1,073,640 (comprising 560,920 males and 512,720 females), increasing at about 1.31% per year.

== Politics ==
=== Government ===
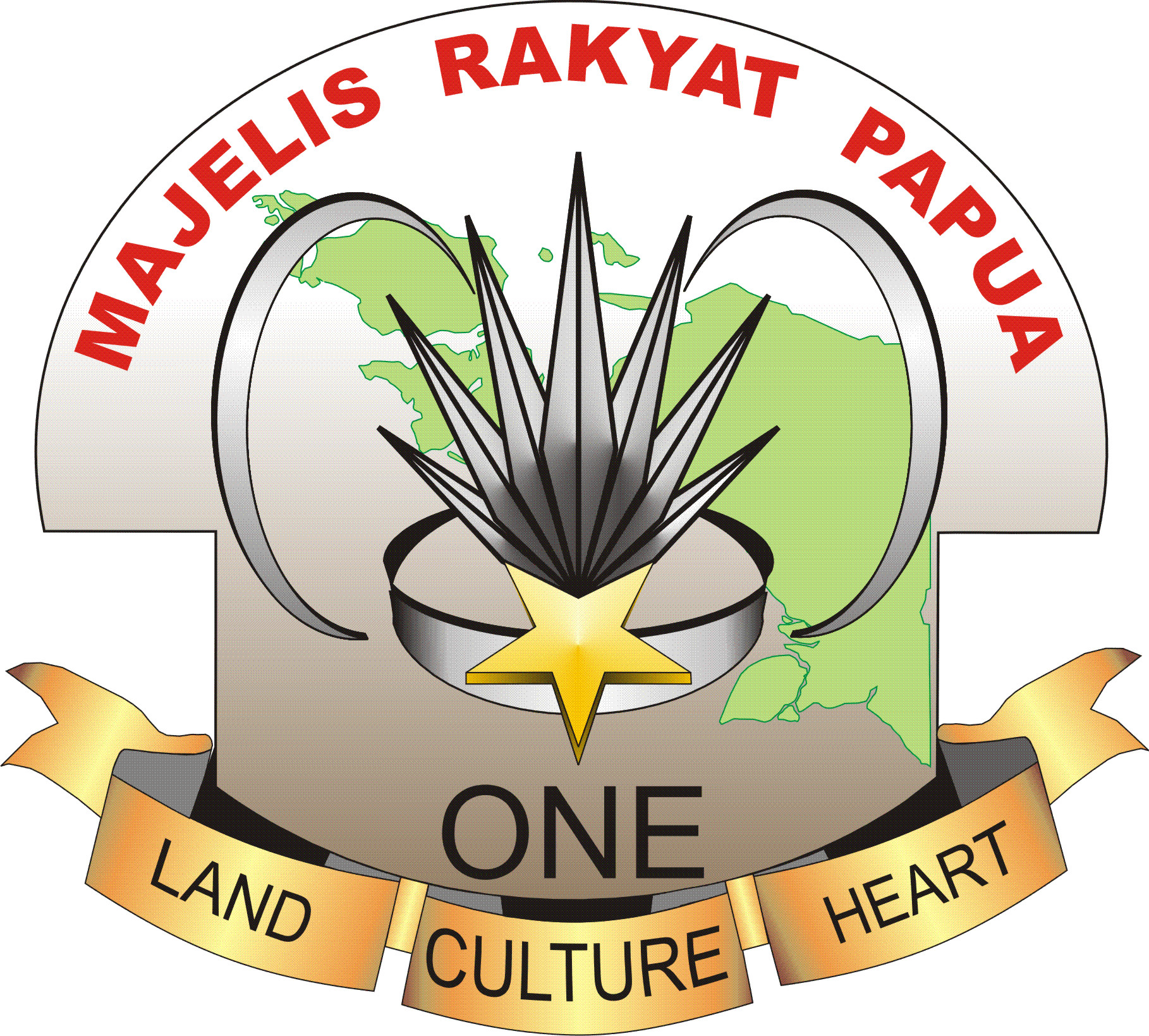
The Papuan People's Assembly is created formally in 2001 to administer the Papuan Special Autonomy

The province of Papua is governed by a directly elected governor and a regional legislature,the People's Representative Council of Papua (Dewan Perwakilan Rakyat Papua, abbreviated as DPRP or DPR Papua). A unique government organization in the province is the Papuan People's Assembly (Majelis Rakyat Papua), which was formed by the Indonesian government in 2005, as mandated by the Papua Special Autonomy Law, as a coalition of Papuan tribal chiefs, Papuan religious leaders, and Papuan women representatives, tasked with arbitration and speaking on behalf of Papuan tribal customs.

Since 2014, the DPRP had 55 members who are elected through General elections every five years and 14 people who are appointed through special autonomy, bringing the total number of DPRP members to 69 people. The DPRP leadership consists of 1 Chairperson and 3 Deputy Chairmen who come from political parties that have the most seats and votes. The current DPRP members are the results of the 2019 General Election which was sworn in on 31 October 2019 by the Chairperson of the Jayapura High Court at the Papua DPR Building. The composition of DPRP members for the 2019–2024 period consists of 13 political parties where the NasDem Party is the governing party with 8 seats, followed by the Democratic Party which also won 8 seats and the Indonesian Democratic Party of Struggle which won 7 seats.

The province of Papua is one of seven provinces to have obtained special autonomy status, the others being Aceh, West Papua, Southwest Papua, Central Papua, Highland Papua and South Papua (the Special Regions of Jakarta and Yogyakarta have similar province-level special status). According to Law 21/2001 on Special Autonomy Status (UU Nomor 21 Tahun 2001 tentang Otonomi khusus Papua), the provincial government of Papua is provided with authority within all sectors of administration, except for the five strategic areas of foreign affairs, security and defense, monetary and fiscal affairs, religion and justice. The provincial government is authorized to issue local regulations to further stipulate the implementation of the special autonomy, including regulating the authority of districts and municipalities within the province. Due to its special autonomy status, Papua province is provided with a significant amount of special autonomy funds, which can be used to benefit its indigenous peoples. However, the province has low fiscal capacity and it is highly dependent on unconditional transfers and the above-mentioned special autonomy fund, which accounted for about 55% of total revenues in 2008.

After obtaining its special autonomy status, to allow the local population access to timber production benefits, the Papuan provincial government issued several decrees, enabling:

- a Timber Logging Permit for Customary Communities, which enabled local people to carry out timber extraction in small concessions (250 to 1,000 hectares) for one year through a community-based or participatory community cooperative;
- a Permit to Manage Customary Forests, which was a timber extraction permit for larger concessions (up to 2,000 hectares) for a maximum of 20 years;
- logging companies had to pay compensations to local communities in addition to all other fees and taxes collected by the national government.

=== Administrative divisions ===
As of 2022 (following the separation of Central Papua, Highland Papua, and South Papua province), the residual Papua Province consisted of 8 regencies (kabupaten) and one city (kota); on the map below, these regencies comprise the northern belt from Waropen Regency to Keerom Regency, plus the island groups to their northwest. Initially, the area now forming the present Papua Province contained three regencies – Jayapura, Yapen Waropen and Biak Numfor. The City of Jayapura was separated on 2 August 1993 from Jayapura Regency and formed into a province-level administration. On 11 December 2002, three new regencies were created – Keerom and Sarmi from parts of Jayapura Regency, and Waropen from part of Yapen Waropen Regency (the rest of this regency was renamed as Yapen Islands). On 18 December 2003 a further regency – Supiori – was created from part of Biak Numfor Regency, and on 15 March 2007 a further regency – Mamberamo Raya – was created from the western part of Sarmi Regency. These regencies and the city are together subdivided into districts (distrik), and thence into "villages" (kelurahan and desa). With the release of Act Number 21 of 2001 concerning the Special Autonomous Region of Papua Province, the term distrik was used instead of kecamatan in the entire Western New Guinea. The difference between the two is merely the terminology, with kepala distrik being the district head.

The regencies (kabupaten) and the city (kota) are listed below with their areas and their populations at the 2020 census and subsequent official estimates for mid-2025, together with the 2020 Human Development Index of each administrative division.

Regional Code	Name of City or Regency	Capital	Districts	Area in km^{2}	Population census 2020	Population estimate mid 2025	HDI (2020)
91.03	Jayapura Regency	Sentani	Airu, Demta, Depapre, Ebungfau, South Gresi, Kaureh, Kemtuk, Kemtuk Gresi, Namblong, Nimbokrang, Nimboran, Ravenirara, Sentani, West Sentani, East Sentani, Unurum Guay, Waibu, Yapsi, Yokari	14,081.94	166,171	174,850	0.717 (High)
91.05	Yapen Islands Regency	Serui	Angkaisera, Anotaurei, Ambai Islands, Kosiwo, Poom, Kurudu Islands, Pulau Yerui, Raimbawi, Teluk Ampimoi, Windesi, Wonawa, West Yapen, South Yapen (Serui), East Yapen, North Yapen, Yawakukat	2,425.37	112,676	120,120	0.677
91.06	Biak Numfor Regency	Biak	Aimando Padaido, Andey, West Biak, Biak City (Biak), East Biak, North Biak, Bondifuar, Bruyadori, West Numfor, East Numfor, Oridek Orkeri, Padaido, Poiru, Samofa, Swandiwe, Warsa, Yawosi, Yendidori	2,258.96	134,650	142,790	0.722 (High) (Medium)
91.10	Sarmi Regency	Sarmi	Apawer Hulu, Bonggo, East Bonggo, West Coast, East Coast, East Coast West, Sarmi, South Sarmi, East Sarmi, Top Tor	14,068.31	41,515	43,480	0.636 (Medium)
91.11	Keerom Regency	Waris	Arso, West Arso, East Arso, Kaisenar, Mannem, Senggi, Skanto, Towe, Waris, Web, Yaffi	9,526.32	61,623	64,830	0.664 (Medium)
91.15	Waropen Regency	Botawa	Demba, Inggerus, Kirihi, Masirei, Oudate, Risei Sayati, Soyoi Mambai, Urei Faisei, Wapoga, Bottom Waropen, Wonti	10,781.04	33,943	36,300	0.649 (Medium)
91.19	Supiori Regency	Sorendiweri	Aruri Islands, West Supiori, South Supiori, East Supiori, North Supiori	660.68	22,547	25,030	0.623 (Medium)
91.20	Mamberamo Raya Regency	Burmeso	Benuki, Mamberamo Hilir, Mamberamo Hulu, Central Mamberamo (Burmeso), East Central Mamberamo, Rufaer, Sawai, Bottom Waropen	26,745.34	36,483	40,140	0.518 (Low)
91.71	Jayapura City		Abepura, Heram, Muara Tami, South Jayapura, North Jayapura	835.44	398,478	426,110	0.799 (High) (Medium)
-	Total Papua; Province			81,383.30	1,008,086	1,073,640	(Medium)

The province now forms one of Indonesia's 84 national electoral districts to elect members to the People's Representative Council. The Papua Electoral District consists of all of the 8 regencies in the province, together with the city of Jayapura, and elects 3 members to the People's Representative Council.

== Geography ==
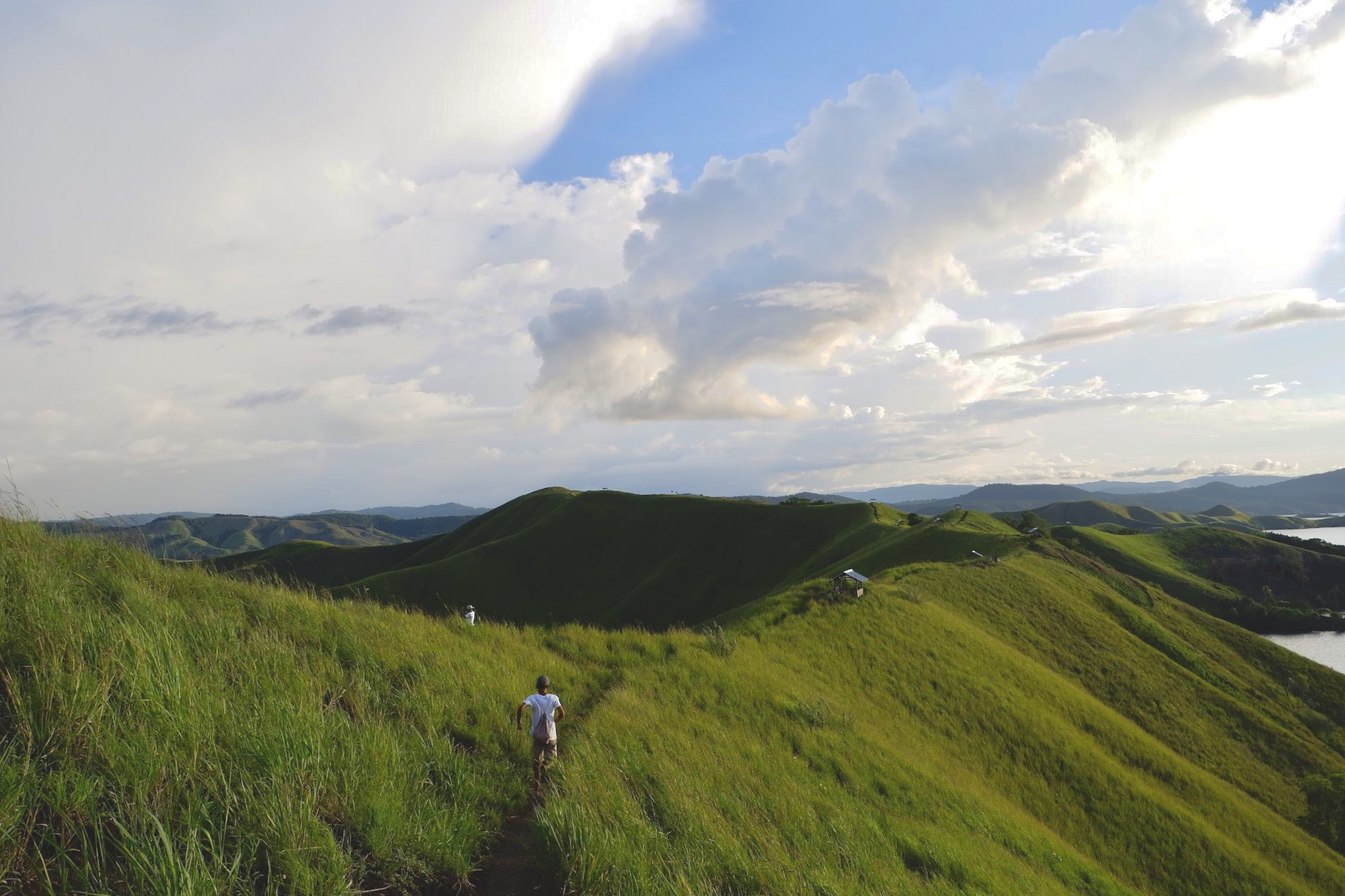
Teletubbies Hill (Tungkiwiri) in Jayapura Regency

The province of Papua is located between 2 ° 25' – 9 ° S and 130 ° – 141 ° East. The total area of Papua is now 82,680.95 km^{2} (31,923.29 sq mi). Until its division in 2022 into four provinces, Papua province was the province that had the largest area in Indonesia, with a total area of 312,816.35 km^{2}, or 19.33% of the total area of the Indonesian archipelago. The boundaries of Papua are: the Pacific Ocean (north), Highland Papua (south), Central Papua (Southwest), and Papua New Guinea (east).

== Demographics ==
Historical population
Year	Pop.	±%
1971	210,901	—
1980	282,310	+33.9%
1990	407,643	+44.4%
2000	534,050	+31.0%
2010	718,782	+34.6%
2020	1,008,086	+40.2%
2024	1,060,550	+5.2%
(data prior to 2022 excludes regencies under Central Papua, Highland Papua and South Papua that were part of the province until 2022); Source: Statistics Indonesia 2025 and earlier.

While the Papuan branch of the Central Agency on Statistics had earlier projected the 2020 population of the province (as constituted at that time) to be 3,435,430 people the actual census in 2020 revealed a total population of 4,303,707, of which the majority were Christian. The official estimate for mid-2022 was 4,418,581 before the division of the province into four separate provinces, spread throughout 28 regencies and one administrative city. Following the division of the province into 4 separate provinces, the city of Jayapura is the most populated administrative division in the province, with a total of 420,580 people in mid-2024, while Supiori Regency, which comprises mainly the island of Supiori, one of the Schouten Islands within Cenderawasih Bay off the north coast of Papua, is the least populated administrative division in the province, with just 24,530 people. Most of the population in the province is concentrated in coastal regions, especially around the city of Jayapura and its suburbs.

=== Religion ===
Religion in Papua (2022)
1. Protestantism (64.2%)
2. Roman Catholicism (5.62%)
3. Islam (29.9%)
4. Hinduism (0.14%)
5. Buddhism (0.15%)
6. Others (0.01%)

According to Indonesian Citizenship and Civil Registry in 2022, 70.15% of the Papuans identified themselves as Christians, with 64.68% being Protestants and 5.47% being Catholics. 29.56% of the population are Muslims and less than 1% are Buddhists or Hindus.

== Culture ==
The native Papuan people have a distinct culture and traditions that cannot be found in other parts of Indonesia. Coastal Papuans are usually more willing to accept modern influence into their daily lives, which in turn diminishes their original culture and traditions. Meanwhile, most inland Papuans still preserve their original culture and traditions, although their way of life over the past century is tied to the encroachment of modernity and globalization. Each Papuan tribe usually practices its tradition and culture, which may differ greatly from one tribe to another.

The Ararem tradition is the tradition of delivering the dowry of a future husband to the family of the prospective wife in the Biak custom. In the Biak language, the word "Ararem" means dowry. In this procession, the bride and groom will be escorted on foot in a procession, accompanied by songs and dances accompanied by music. The amount of the dowry is determined by the woman's family as agreed by her relatives. The date of submission of the dowry must be agreed upon by the family of the woman or the family of the prospective wife and the family of the man or the family of the prospective husband. In the tradition of the Biak people, the payment of the dowry is a tradition that must be obeyed because it involves the consequences of a marriage.

=== Arts and performance ===
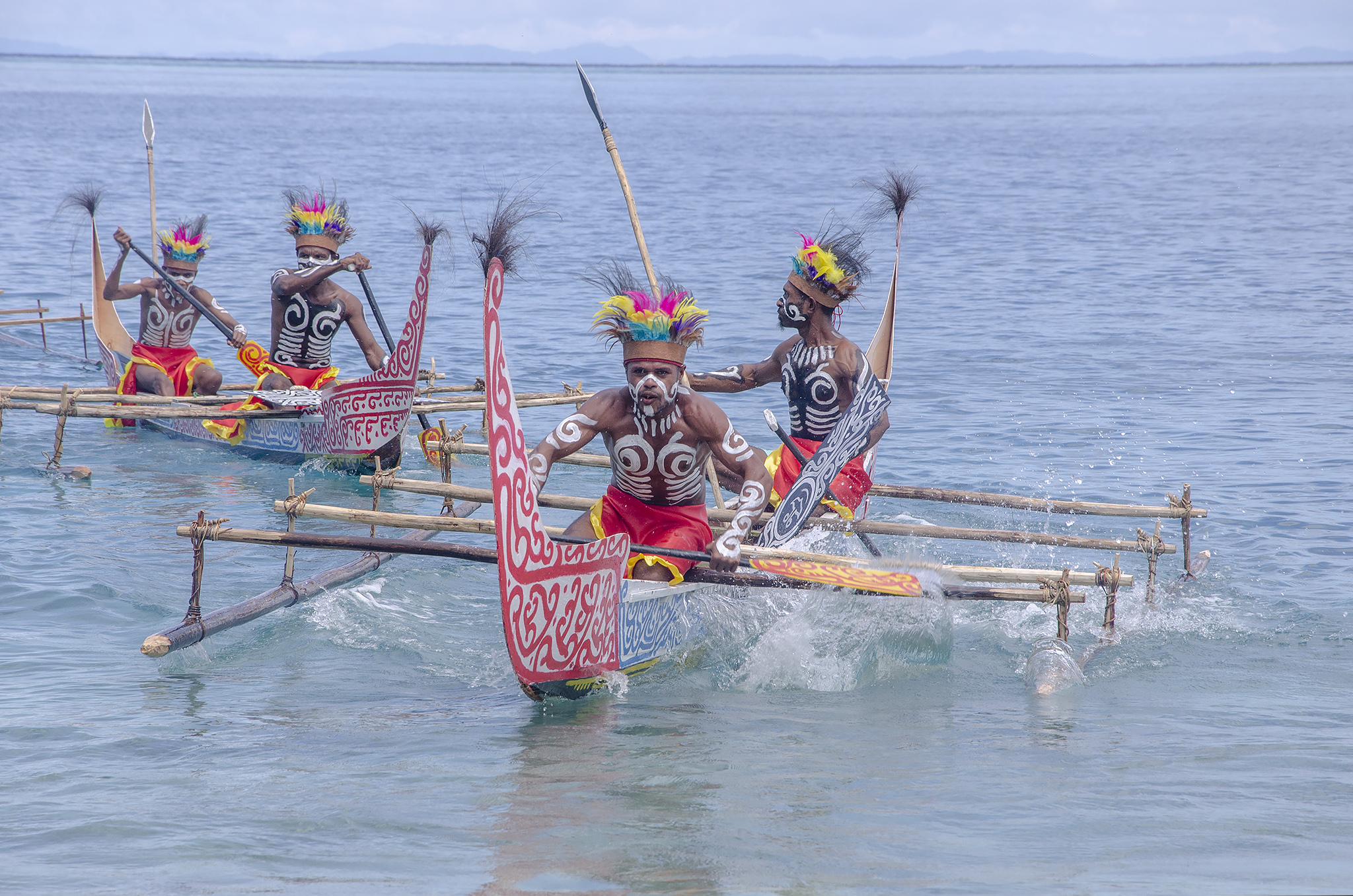
Biak people during a ceremony

There are many traditional dances native to Papua, and each Papuan tribe usually has their own unique traditional dances.

The Yospan dance (Indonesian: Tarian Yospan) is a type of traditional and social association dance originating from the coastal regions of Papua, namely Biak, Yapen, and Waropen; it is often performed by young people as a form of friendship. Initially, the Yospan dance originated from two dances called Yosim and Pancar, which were eventually combined into one—hence, Yospan is an acronym of the words Yosim and Pancar. When performing the Yosim dance, originally from Yapen and Waropen, the dancers often invited other residents to listen. The instruments usually consist of ukulele and guitar, neither of which are native to Papua, as well as a form of bass with three strings made from rolled pandanus fibers leaf found in coastal forest. A musical instrument called kalabasa is also played during the dance, made of dried calabash, and then filled with beads or small stones that are shaken to produce sound. Female dancers wear woven sarongs to cover their chests, and decorative heads with flowers and bird feathers. Meanwhile, the male dancers would usually wear shorts, open chests, and with heads also decorated with bird feathers. The Pancar dance originating from Biak is only accompanied by a tifa, the traditional musical instrument of the coastal tribes in Papua.

The Isosolo dance is performed on boats by the inhabitants who live around Lake Sentani in Jayapura Regency, and is danced to symbolize the harmony between different tribes in Papua. Boat dancing is a tradition of various Papuan peoples, especially among the Sentani people, where the dance is performed in various villages. The word isosolo consists of two words in the Sentani language: iso, meaning to rejoice and dance with joy, and solo (or holo), meaning a group of people from all ages who dance; thus isosolo means a group of people who dance with joy. The Isosolo dance of the Sentani is usually performed by ondofolo (traditional leaders) and the village community to present a gift to other ondofolo. Valuable items are offered, such as large wild boar, garden products, girls to be married, and other traditional gifts. However, besides being a form of respect for the ondoafi, the Isosolo dance is nowadays more of a Sentani performative dance, and a popular attraction at the annual Sentani Lake Festival.

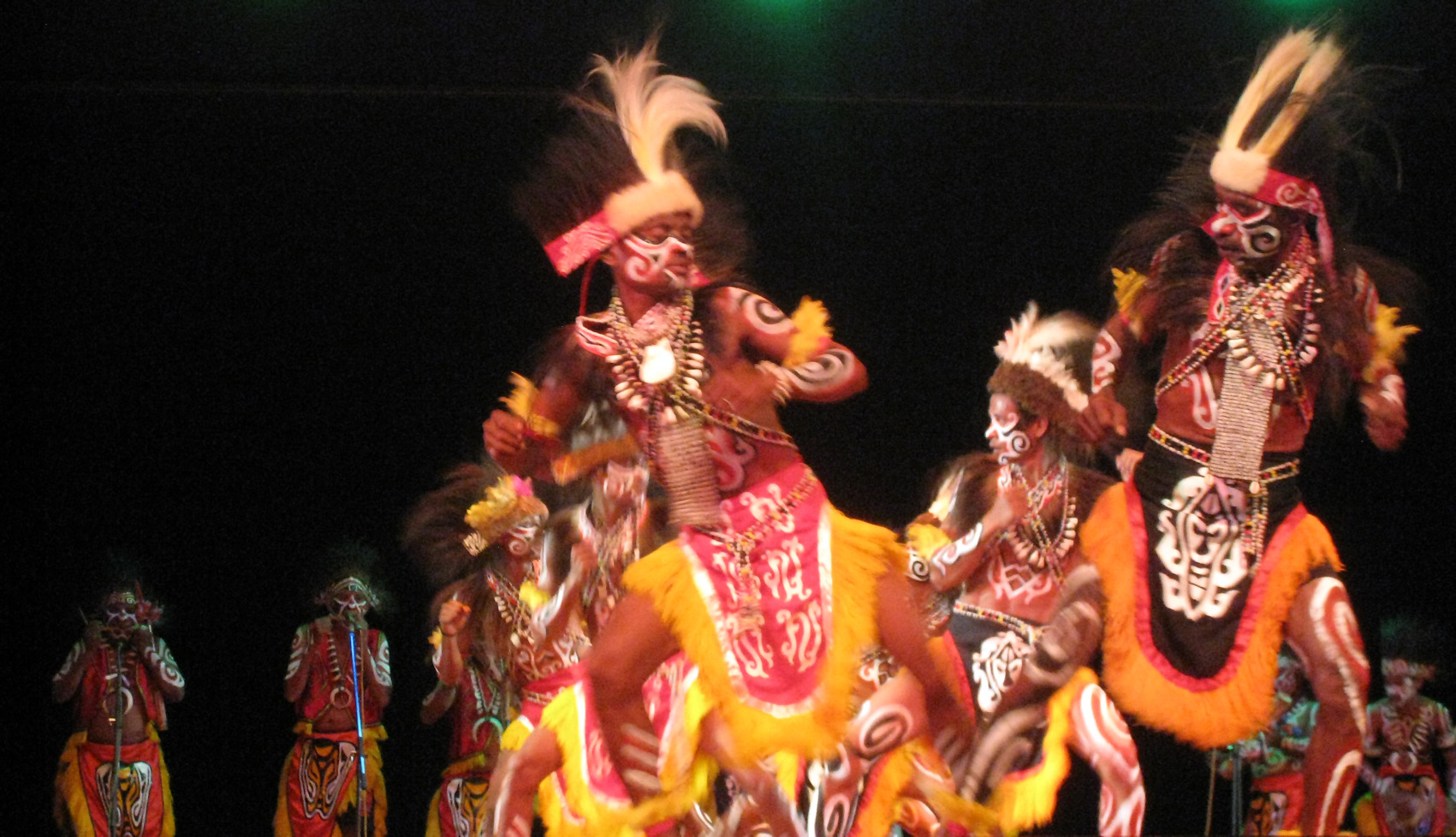
The Afaitaneng dance (id), a traditional Papuan war dance performed by the Ambai people from Menawi village and Ambai village in the Yapen Islands

Each Papuan tribe usually has its own war dance, one of the oldest forms of Papuan dance. In Papuan culture, these dances are a symbol of Papuan strength and bravery; allegedly, this dance was once a part of traditional ceremonies when fighting other tribes.

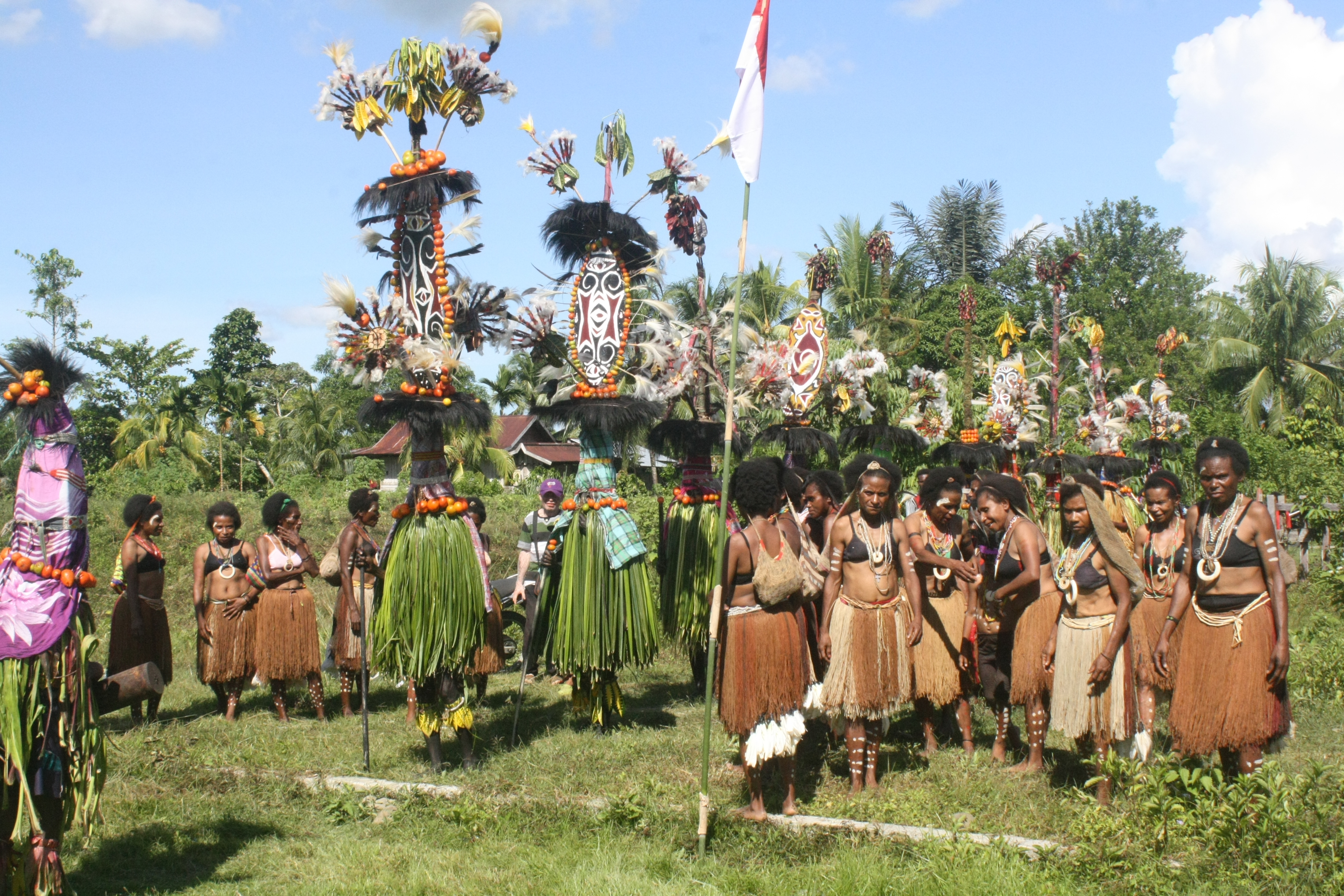
Kepala Panjang ("Long Head") dance, a sacred healing ritual to absorb negative energy of the Draa people from Yaffi District in Keerom.

Another traditional dance common to most Papuan tribes is the musyoh dance, the emergence of which is based on an old myth. In ancient times, when a tribal member died due to an accident or something unexpected, the Papuan people believed that the evil spirit (Suanggi) of the person who died was still roaming and unsettled. To overcome this, the Papuan tribesmen created an exorcism ritual in the form of the musyoh dance, and it is thus often referred to as an exorcism dance. Besides exorcism, the musyoh dance is also used for other purposes, such as welcoming guests, and can be a symbol of respect and gratitude, and an expression of happiness. If being done for exorcism, the musyoh dance is performed by men, but in the case of welcoming guests, it is performed by both men and women. The dancers wear simple costumes, consisting of head coverings, tops, and bottoms, made from processed tree bark and plant roots. These are then adorned with bracelets, necklaces, and body paint on the dancers' bodies.

=== Architecture ===
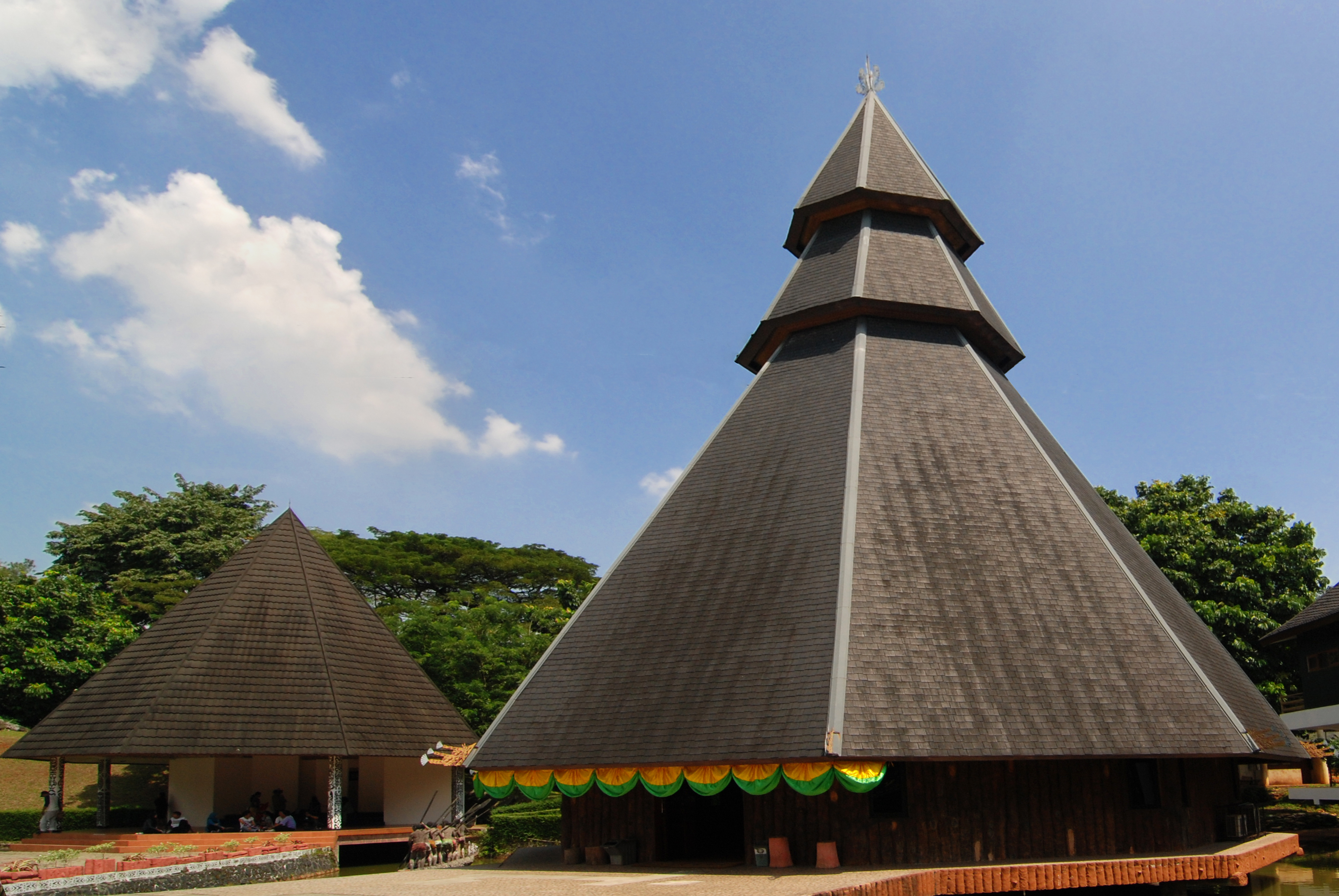
A kariwari house common in regions around Yos Sudarso Bay, depicted at Taman Mini Indonesia Indah theme park in Jakarta

The kariwari is one of the traditional Papuan houses, more precisely the traditional house of the Tobati-Enggros people who live around Yotefa Bay and Lake Sentani near Jayapura. Unlike other forms of Papuan traditional houses, such as the round honai, the kariwari is usually constructed in the shape of an octagonal pyramid. Kariwari is usually made of bamboo, ironwood and forest sago leaves. The Kariwari house consists of two floors and three rooms or three rooms, each with different functions. The kariwari is not like a honai that can be lived in by anyone; it cannot even be the residence of a tribal chief, unlike the honai, which has political and legal functions. The kariwari is specifically a place of education and worship; the position of the kariwari in the community of the Tobati-Enggros people is therefore considered sacred and holy. Like traditional houses in general, the kariwari also has a design that is full of decorative details that make it unique, of course, the decorations are related to Papuan culture especially from the Tobati-Enggros. The decorations found in the kariwari are usually in the form of works of art, among others; paintings, carvings and also sculptures. Apart from being decorated with works of art, the kariwari is also decorated with various weapons, such as; a bow and arrow. There are also some skeletons of prey animals, usually in the form of wild boar fangs, kangaroo skeletons, turtle or turtle shells, birds-of-paradise, and so on.

Rumsram is the traditional house of the Biak Numfor people on the northern coast of Papua. This house was originally intended for men, while women were prohibited from entering or approaching it. Its function is similar to the kariwari, namely as a place for activities in teaching and educating men who are starting to be teenagers, in seeking life experiences. The building is square with a roof in the shape of an upside-down boat because of the background of the Biak Numfor tribe who work as sailors. The materials used are bark for floors, split and chopped water bamboo for walls, while the roof is made of dried sago leaves. The walls are made of sago leaves. The original rumsram wall only had a few windows and its position was at the front and back. A rumsram usually has a height of approximately 6–8 m and is divided into two parts, differentiated by floor levels. The first floor is open and without walls. Only the building columns were visible. In this place, men are educated to learn sculpting, shielding, boat building, and war techniques. In a traditional ceremony called Wor Kapanaknik, which in the Biak language means "to shave a child's hair", a traditional ritual is usually carried out when boys are 6–8 years old. The age when a child is considered to be able to think and the child has started to get an education in the search for life experiences, as well as how to become a strong and responsible man as the head of the family later. The children would then enter a rumsram, hence the rite of passage is also called rumsram, because the ritual is carried out in the rumsram.

=== Traditional weapons ===
The cuscus bone skewer is a traditional Papuan weapon used by one of the indigenous Papuan tribes, namely the Bauzi people. The Bauzi people still maintain their tradition of hunting and gathering. The weapon they use to hunt animals while waiting for the harvest to arrive is a piercing tool made of cuscus bones. The use of cuscus bones as a traditional weapon is very environmentally friendly. This happens because, in its manufacture, it does not require the help of industrial equipment that pollutes the environment. This traditional weapon is made from cleaned cuscus bone (before the meat is eaten and separated from the bone), sharpened by rubbing it with a whetstone, and repeated so that the desired sharpness is formed.

Papuan knife blades are usually used for slashing or cutting when hunting animals in the forest. Even though the animals they face are large mammals and crocodiles, the Papuan people still adhere to prevailing customs. The custom is that it is not permissible to use any kind of firearm when hunting. Papuan daggers are knives made of unique materials and are difficult to obtain in other areas, namely the bones of an endemic animal to Papua, the cassowary. Cassowary bones are used by local culture to become a tool that has beneficial values for life. Apart from that, the feathers attached to the blade's handle are also the feathers of the cassowary.

The spear is referred to by the local community of Sentani as Mensa. The spear was a weapon that could be used for both fighting and hunting. In addition, Papuan culture often uses the spear as a property in dances. The weapons mentioned above are made from basic materials that are easily found in nature. Wood to make the handle, and a river stone that was sharpened as a spearhead. For that reason, the spear can survive as a weapon that must be present in hunting and fighting activities. What makes this traditional Papuan weapon feel special is that there is a rule not to use a spear other than for hunting and fighting purposes. For example, it is forbidden to cut young tree shoots with a spear or to use a spear to carry garden produce. If this rule was broken, the person who wielded this spear would have bad luck. Meanwhile, in the manufacturing process, this spear frame takes a long time. Starting from the wood taken from the tree kayu swang with a diameter of 25 cm. After drying it in the sun, the wood is split into four and shaped so it has a rounded cross-section, then the tip is shaped until it formed a two-sided and leaf shaped spear-tip.

The bow and arrow is a traditional Papuan weapon locally in Sentani called Fela that has uses for hunting wild boar and other animals. The arrowheads are made from the bark of a sago tree, the bow is made from a type of wild betel nut tree which can also be made the arrowheads, the shaft is made from a type of grass, small-sized bamboo which do not have cavity and rattan as the bowstring. Depending on the phase of for battle there are variety of arrow type, Hiruan is a plain sharp arrow with no decoration to lure the enemy; Humbai is a sharp arrow which have one serrated sided tip and the other plain, used to shoot seen enemy that is getting closer; Hube is an arrow with both sides serrated, used for enemy that is getting closer still; Humame is an arrow with three sided serrated tip, used for a really close enemy; Hukeli is an arrow with four-sided serrated arrowhead, used only after Humame depleted; Pulung Waliman is an arrow with two-sided arrowhead, with three large teeth, and hole in the middle, only used to kill enemy chieftain. In addition, for hunting three kinds of arrows are used, Hiruan which have similar characteristic as war Hiruan other than different shape; Maigue is an arrow with two-pronged tip; and Ka'ai is an arrow with three-pronged tip.

The Papuan parang called Yali in Sentani is made from old swang wood, take 2–3 days to make and can be made before or after drying the wood. It can be used for household purposes, namely cooking, cutting meat, cutting vegetables and cutting down sago. In addition, Papuan machetes are also used in the agricultural industry and be used as a collection. Usually it will have carving symbolizing prosperity for humans or prosperity for animals.

Sentani oars are traditional tools called Roreng for males and Biareng for females. They are made from swang wood and the bark of sago trees. The wood was split to create flat surface and then shaped like an oar, with the tip made thinner and sharper. It primarily functioned as an oar to propel canoes forward, but under attack from enemies from the seas it can be used as spear because of its sharp tip. Usually oars have ornamental engravings shaped like a finger called Hiokagema to symbolize unity of strength of ten fingers to power the oars.

Stone axes from Sentani are called Mamehe usually made from river stones secured to the handle with rattan. Usually it was made from batu pualan (marble) which was then shaped with another stone by chipping slowly. According local tradition the making of the stone have to be done secretly from the family, and can take up to 2 months. For the handle it was constructed using swang wood or ironwood. One part was to secure the axe head and another for the handle, with all parts tied together using rattan. the axe are usually made for cutting down trees and canoes building, however currently used more often as collections.

=== Music and handicrafts ===
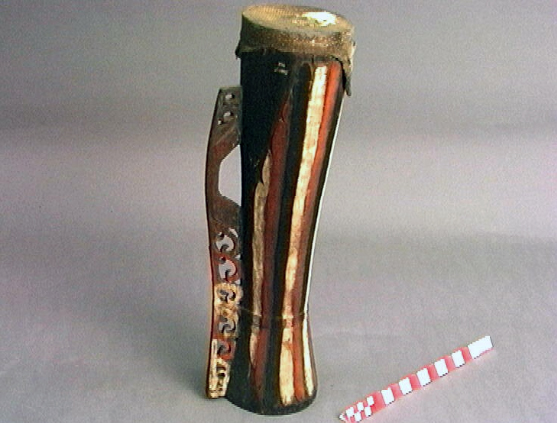
Tifa, a Papuan musical instrument

Tifa is a traditional Papuan musical instrument that is played by beating. Unlike those from Maluku, this musical instrument from Papua is usually longer and has a handle on one part of the instrument. Meanwhile, the tifa from Maluku has a wide size and there is no handle on the side. The material used also comes from the strongest wood, usually the type of Lenggua wood (Pterocarpus indicus) with animal skin as the upper membrane. The animal's skin is tied with rattan in a circle so that it is tight and can produce a beautiful sound. In addition, on the body part of the musical instrument there is a typical Papuan carving. Tifa is usually used to accompany guest welcoming events, traditional parties, dances, etc. The size of the sound that comes out of the drum depends on the size of the instrument. Apart from being a means of accompanying the dance, the tifa also has a social meaning based on the function and shape of the carved ornaments on the body of the tifa. In the culture of the Marind-Anim people in Merauke, each clan has its own shape and motif as well as a name for each tifa. The same goes for the Biak and Waropen people.

The triton is a traditional Papuan musical instrument that is played by blowing it. This musical instrument is found throughout the coast, especially in the Biak, Yapen, Waropen and Nabire. Initially, this tool was only used as a means of communication or as a means of calling and signaling. Currently this instrument is also used as a means of entertainment and traditional musical instruments.

=== Cuisine ===
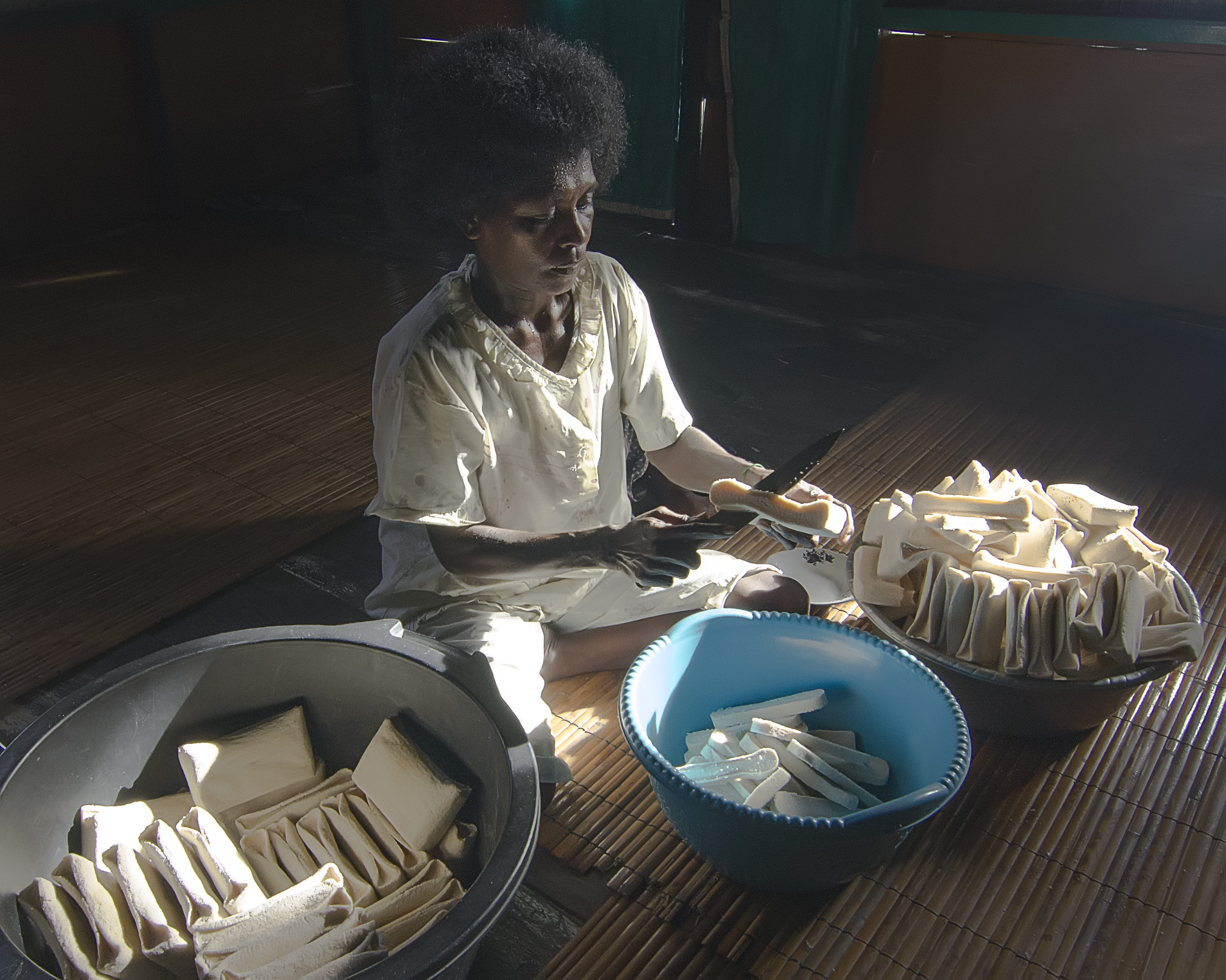
Sago is a typical Papuan food, which is usually made into papeda.

The native Papuan food usually consists of roasted boar with tubers such as sweet potato. The staple food of Papua and eastern Indonesia in general is sago, as the counterpart of central and western Indonesian cuisines that favour rice as their staple food. Sago is either processed as a pancake or sago congee called papeda, usually eaten with yellow soup made from tuna, red snapper or other fishes spiced with turmeric, lime, and other spices. On some coasts and lowlands on Papua, sago is the main ingredient to all the foods.

In the coastal regions, seafood is the main food for the local people. One of the famous seafoods from Papua is fish wrap (Indonesian: ikan bungkus). Wrapped fish in other areas is called pepes ikan. Wrapped fish from Papua is known to be very fragrant. This is because there are additional bay leaves so that the mixture of spices is more fragrant and soaks into the fish meat. The basic ingredient of Papuan wrapped fish is sea fish, the most commonly used fish is milkfish. Milkfish is suitable for "wrap" because it has meat that does not crumble after processing. The spices are sliced or cut into pieces, namely, red and bird's eye chilies, bay leaves, tomatoes, galangal, and lemongrass stalks. While other spices are turmeric, garlic and red, red chilies, coriander, and hazelnut. The spices are first crushed and then mixed or smeared on the fish. The wrapping is in banana leaves.

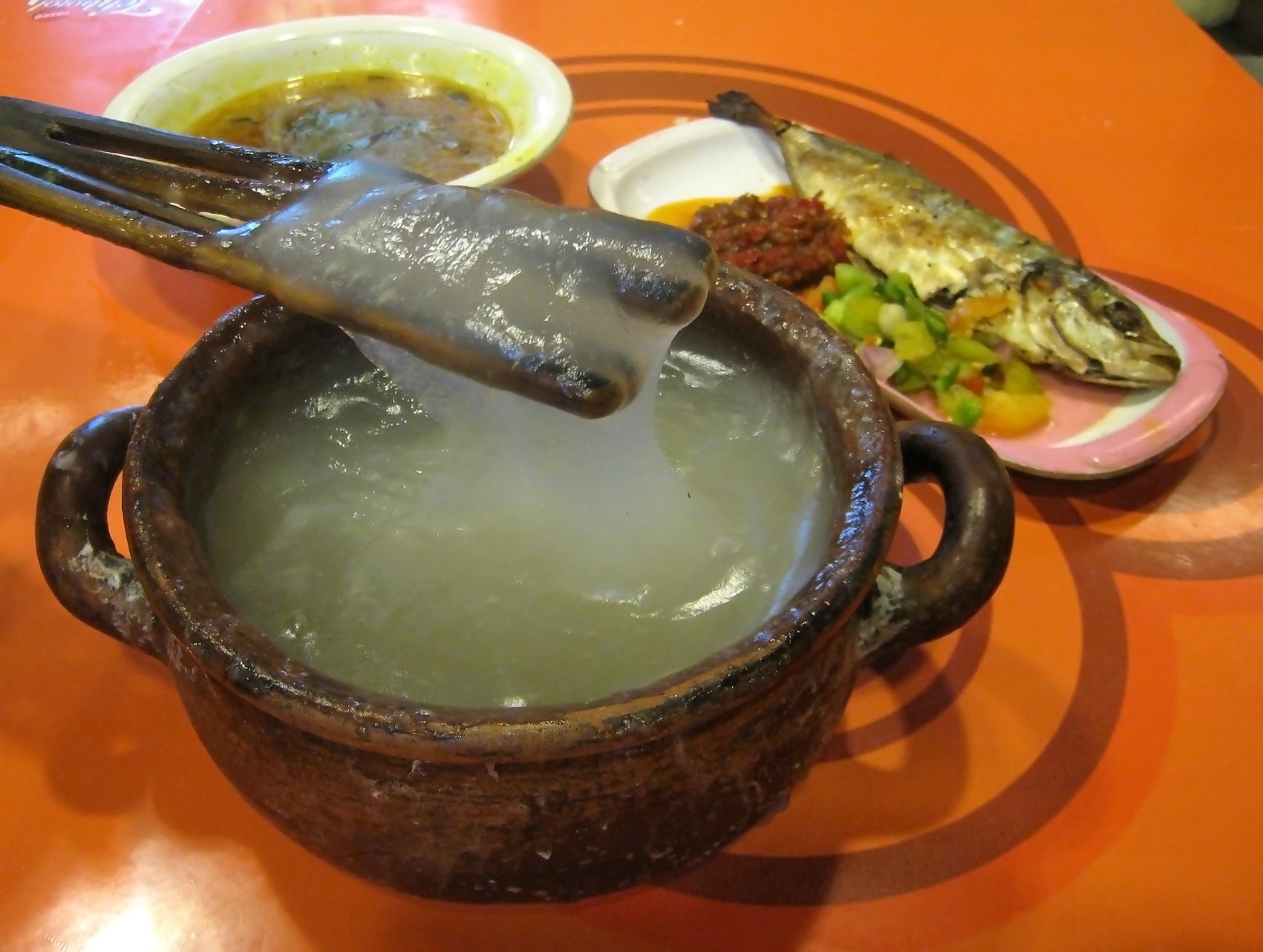
Papeda, a notable dish originating from Eastern Indonesia

Common Papuan snacks are usually made out of sago. Kue bagea (also called sago cake) is a cake originating from Ternate in North Maluku, although it can also be found in Papua. It has a round shape and creamy color. Bagea has a hard consistency that can be softened in tea or water, to make it easier to chew. It is prepared using sago, a plant-based starch derived from the sago palm or sago cycad. Sagu Lempeng is a typical Papuan snacks that is made in the form of processed sago in the form of plates. Sagu Lempeng are also a favorite for travelers. But it is very difficult to find in places to eat because this bread is a family consumption and is usually eaten immediately after cooking. Making sago plates is as easy as making other breads. Sago is processed by baking it by printing rectangles or rectangles with iron which is ripe like white bread. Initially tasteless, but recently it has begun to vary with sugar to get a sweet taste. It has a tough texture and can be enjoyed by mixing it or dipping it in water to make it softer. Sago porridge is a type of porridge that are found in Papua. This porridge is usually eaten with yellow soup made of mackerel or tuna then seasoned with turmeric and lime. Sago porridge is sometimes also consumed with boiled tubers, such as those from cassava or sweet potato. Vegetable papaya flowers and sautéed kale are often served as side dishes to accompany the sago porridge. In the coastal regions, Sago worms are usually served as a type of snack dish. Sago worms come from sago trunks which are cut and left to rot. The rotting stems cause the worms to come out. The shape of the sago worms varies, ranging from the smallest to the largest size of an adult's thumb. These sago caterpillars are usually eaten alive or cooked beforehand, such as stir-frying, cooking, frying and then skewered. But over time, the people of Papua used to process these sago caterpillars into sago caterpillar satay. To make satay from this sago caterpillar, the method is no different from making satay in general, namely on skewers with a skewer and grilled over hot coals.

== Coat of arms ==
The coat of arms of Papua is shaped like a five-sided shield, symbolizing vigilance and resilience. The five sides represent the principles of Pancasila, the philosophical foundation of Indonesia.

Inside the shield, there are three monuments standing on a pile of stones arranged in groups of 6 and 9, symbolizing the struggle of Trikora and the Penentuan Pendapat Rakyat held in 1969.

On both sides are rice and cotton, with 7 grains of rice and 8 cotton buds, tied together with a ribbon folded 4 times with 5 tassels. Altogether, these elements represent the Proclamation of Indonesian Independence on 17 August 1945.

At the top, three snow-capped mountains of equal height are depicted, representing the natural features and identity of Papua Province.

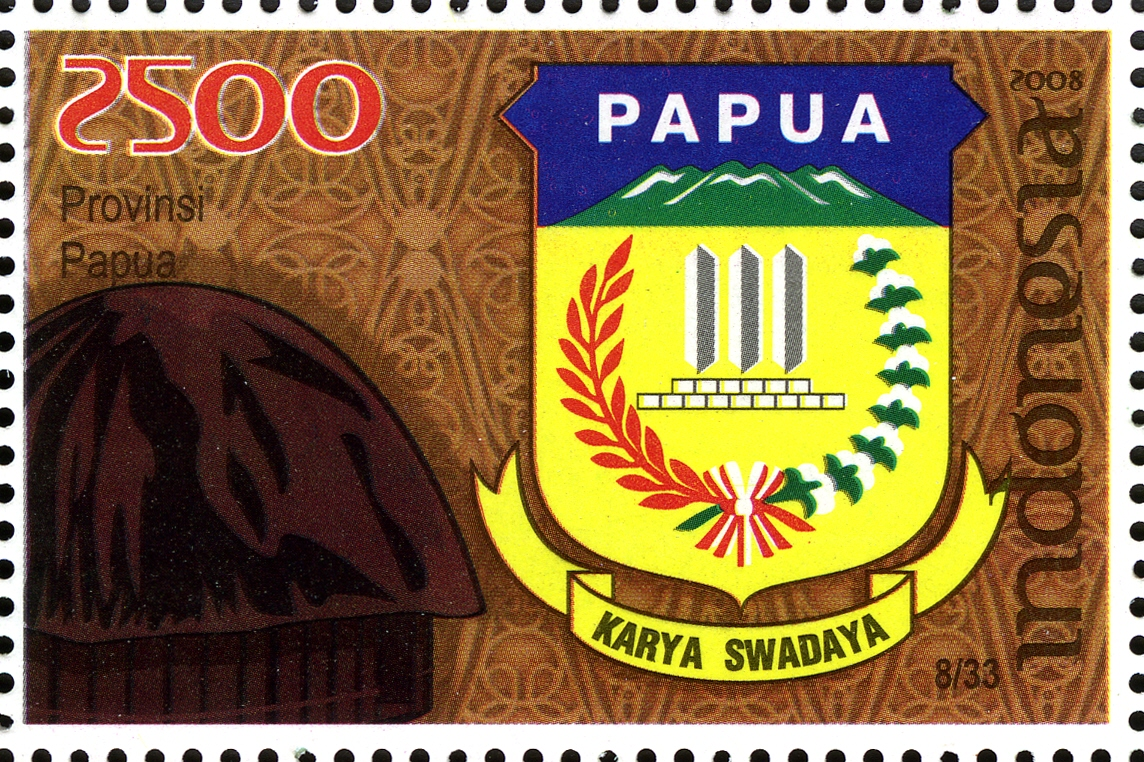
Coat of arms of Papua stamp

== See also ==
- Districts of Papua
- List of earthquakes in Indonesia
- List of rivers of Papua

== Cited works ==
- L, Klemen (2000). "Forgotten Campaign: The Dutch East Indies Campaign 1941–1942". Archived from the original on 26 July 2011.
- Lumintang, Onnie; Haryono, P. Suryo; Gunawan, Restu; Nurhajarini, Dwi Ratna (1997). Biografi Pahlawan Nasional Marthin Indey dan Silas Papare (PDF) (in Indonesian). Indonesia: Ministry of Education and Culture.
