= Yaur language =

Language

Yaur
- Jaur
- rí hègùuré
- Native to: Indonesia
- Region: Central Papua
- Ethnicity: Yaur
- Native speakers: (350 cited 1978)
- Language family: Austronesian: Malayo-Polynesian; Central–Eastern Malayo-Polynesian; Eastern Malayo-Polynesian; South Halmahera–West New Guinea; Cenderawasih Bay; Southwestern; Yaur-Yerisiam; Yaur

Language codes
- ISO 639-3: jau
- Glottolog: yaur1239
- Coordinates: 3.33°S 134.88°E

Yaur or Jaur is a language in the Cenderawasih (Geelvink Bay) branch of the Austronesian family spoken in Nabire Regency, Central Papua, Indonesia. It has about 300 speakers. It is closely related to Yerisiam and more distantly to Umar.

== See also ==
- Yaur people
