= Busami language =

Austronesian language of Indonesia

Busami
- Native to: Indonesia
- Region: Yapen Island
- Native speakers: (700 cited 1993)
- Language family: Austronesian: Malayo-Polynesian; Central–Eastern Malayo-Polynesian; Eastern Malayo-Polynesian; South Halmahera–West New Guinea; Cenderawasih Bay; Yapen; Central–Western; Central; Busami

Language codes
- ISO 639-3: bsm
- Glottolog: busa1254

Busami is an Austronesian language spoken in Papua Province of Western New Guinea, northeastern Indonesia.
