= Papuma language =

Language in Papua

Papuma
- Native to: Indonesia
- Region: Yapen Island
- Native speakers: (600 cited 1982)
- Language family: Austronesian: Malayo-Polynesian; Central–Eastern Malayo-Polynesian; Eastern Malayo-Polynesian; South Halmahera–West New Guinea; Cenderawasih Bay; Yapen; Central–Western; Central; Papuma

Language codes
- ISO 639-3: ppm
- Glottolog: papu1251
- ELP: Papuma

Papuma is an Eastern Malayo-Polynesian language spoken in Papua Province of Western New Guinea, northeastern Indonesia.
