= North Babar language =

Austronesian language spoken in Maluku, Indonesia

North Babar
- Native to: Indonesia
- Region: Maluku
- Native speakers: 1,000 (2007)
- Language family: Austronesian: Malayo-Polynesian (MP); Central–Eastern MP; Babar; North; North Babar

Language codes
- ISO 639-3: bcd
- Glottolog: nort2860

North Babar is an Austronesian language spoken on the north coast of Babar Island in South Maluku, Indonesia.
