= Ansus language =

Austronesian language spoken in Indonesia

Ansus
- Native to: Indonesia
- Region: Miosnum Island and the south coast of Yapen Island
- Native speakers: (4,600 cited 1987)
- Language family: Austronesian: Malayo-Polynesian; Central–Eastern Malayo-Polynesian; Eastern Malayo-Polynesian; South Halmahera–West New Guinea; Cenderawasih Bay; Yapen; Central–Western; Ansus

Language codes
- ISO 639-3: and
- Glottolog: ansu1237

Ansus is an Austronesian language spoken by the Ansus people in the Papua Province of Western New Guinea, Indonesia.

It is one of the South Halmahera–West New Guinea languages.
