= Marau language =

Yapen language spoken in Indonesia

Marau
- Native to: Indonesia
- Region: South coast of Yapen Island and Ambai Islands group
- Native speakers: (1,700 cited 1987)
- Language family: Austronesian: Malayo-Polynesian; Central–Eastern Malayo-Polynesian; Eastern Malayo-Polynesian; South Halmahera–West New Guinea; Cenderawasih Bay; Yapen; Central–Western; Marau
- Dialects: Warabori

Language codes
- ISO 639-3: mvr
- Glottolog: mara1397

Marau is an Eastern Malayo-Polynesian language spoken on the south coast of Serui Island of the Ambai Islands group in Cenderawasih Bay, within Papua Province of Western New Guinea, northeastern Indonesia.
