= Pom language =

Language in Papua

Pom
- Native to: Indonesia
- Region: Miosnum Island, Cenderawasih Bay
- Native speakers: (2,000 cited 1987)
- Language family: Austronesian: Malayo-Polynesian; Central–Eastern Malayo-Polynesian; Eastern Malayo-Polynesian; South Halmahera–West New Guinea; Cenderawasih Bay; Yapen; Central–Western; Central; Pom

Language codes
- ISO 639-3: pmo
- Glottolog: pomm1237

Pom is an Eastern Malayo-Polynesian language spoken on Miosnum Island in Cenderawasih Bay west of Serui Island, in Papua Province of Western New Guinea, northeastern Indonesia. It has around 2000 speakers. This wordlist was recorded by Emily Gasser with Pom speakers Yanselt Borotabui, Spenyei Awendu, Frengky Mantundoi, Frence Kapitaray, and Memase Kadwaru on the Unipa campus in Manokwari in June/July 2016.

Serewen is a dialect.
