= Telaʼa language =

Austronesian language spoken in Maluku, Indonesia

Telaʼa
- Tela-Masbuar
- Native to: Indonesia
- Region: Maluku
- Native speakers: 1,100 (2007)
- Language family: Austronesian: Malayo-Polynesian (MP); Central–Eastern MP; Babar; South Babar; Southwest Babar; Telaʼa

Language codes
- ISO 639-3: tvm
- Glottolog: tela1241

Telaʼa, or Tela-Masbuar (Masbuar-Tela) is an Austronesian language spoken in the two villages with those names on Babar Island in South Maluku, Indonesia.
