= Air Matoa language =

Recently extinct Papuan language of Indonesia

Air Matoa
- Native to: Indonesia
- Region: Rurumo
- Ethnicity: Air Matoa people
- Extinct: 2017
- Language family: Language isolate

Language codes
- ISO 639-3: None (mis)
- Glottolog: airm1242 Air Matoa

Air Matoa is a recently extinct Papuan language formerly spoken in the village of Rurumo around Etna Bay, Kaimana, in West Papua, Indonesia. The last speaker died in 2017, and the language is known only from vocabulary items and phonological descriptions, without having its grammar documented.

== History ==
Speakers of Air Matoa originally lived in a village of the same name prior to 1976; they relocated to Rurumo, located on the coast of Etna Bay District, in order to "improve their mobility". Following their move, Air Matoa became displaced by Yeresiam, an Austronesian language; as a result, only a single speaker of Air Matoa was left by 2008. In 2010, the speaker was reported by Anthonius Maturbong of the Papua Language Bureau to be an elder. According to residents of Rurumo, the last speaker of Air Matoa died in 2017, rendering the language extinct. Its extinction followed that of other Indonesian languages such as Tandia, Mapia, and Mawes.

=== Documentation ===
Air Matoa was only documented in its lexicon and phonology prior to its extinction. As a consequence, the data collected for it are rather limited, and a complete picture of it cannot be obtained.

== Classification ==
Only the word iːna 'mother' in Air Matoa bears any similarity with other languages, according to Glottolog, which further describes it as "resembl[ing] no other language in the region".

== Phonology ==
=== Vowels ===
A total of five vowel phonemes are present in Air Matoa.

Air Matoa vowels
	Front	Central	Back
High	i		u
Middle	e		o
Low		a	

/i/ has allophones of [i] and [ɪ], /e/ has allophones of [e] and [ɛ], /o/ has allophones of [o] and [ɔ], and /u/ has allophones of [u] and [ʊ]. Air Matoa also has long forms of all allophones except in [o]. /e/ is not found word-initially.

=== Consonants ===
15 consonant phonemes are found in Air Matoa.

Air Matoa consonants
		Bilabial	Labiodental	Dental/Alveolar	Palatal	Velar
Plosive	voiceless	p		t		k
Plosive	voiced	b		d	ɟ	ɡ
Fricative			f	s		
Nasal		m		n		ŋ
Trill				r		
Semivowel		w			j	

/b, d, f, g, ɟ, k, p, r, s, t/ are restricted to the word-initial position, /ŋ/ can only be found word-medially, /m, n, w/ can occur in both word-initial and medial positions, and /j/ is found only word-initially and finally, the only consonant found in that position.

=== Phonotactics ===
Air Matoa displays syllables in the shapes of V, VC, CV, CVC, and CCV (where C represents a wildcard for any consonant and V for any vowel). Open syllables are more common than closed ones.
