= Southeast Babar language =

Austronesian language spoken in Maluku, Indonesia

Southeast Babar
- Native to: Indonesia
- Region: Maluku
- Native speakers: 4,500 (2007)
- Language family: Austronesian: Malayo-Polynesian (MP); Central–Eastern MP; Babar; South Babar; Masela–Southeast; Southeast Babar

Language codes
- ISO 639-3: vbb
- Glottolog: sout2883

Southeast Babar is an Austronesian language spoken on Babar Island in South Maluku, Indonesia.

== Phonology ==
=== Consonants ===
The following consonant inventory is provided by Steinhauer (2009).

		Labial	Alveolar	Dorsal
Plosive	voiceless	p	t	k
Plosive	voiced	b	d	(ɡ)
Nasal		m	n	(ŋ)
Fricative		(f)	(s)	x
Trill			r	
Lateral			l	
Approximant		w		j

- Sounds /ɡ s ŋ/ only occur in loanwords.
- /f/ is only attested in loanwords and also infrequently in roots.
- /b/ and /d/ are marginal and only occur in a few words.

==== Other consonants in Taber's wordlist ====
A wordlist collected in a 1993 article by Mark Taber records words with extra distinct sounds that are not recorded nor accorded phonemic status in Steinhauer's study.

Consonants exclusively appearing in Taber's wordlist
Sound	Words with the sound	Comments
tʰ	[utʰ] "dog, banana"	Corresponds to word-final /tj/ clusters recorded by Steinhauer, e.g. Steinhauer records "dog" and "banana" as uty.
h	[taˈha] "this", [ɛhɛlˈlei] "here", [ɛhɛllɛˈnei] "there", [hlil] "ear"	Should have been deleted by regular sound laws. Might correspond to /x/ in some cases (like in "ear", which is recorded by Steinhauer as xlil)
ʔ	[ˈtaʔanɛ] "that"	Steinhauer records glottal stops as occurring non-phonemically at the starts of otherwise vowel-initial words.
d͡ʒ	[d͡ʒai] "what?"	

=== Vowels ===
	Front	Central	Back
Close	i iː		u
Mid	ɛ ɛː		ɔ ɔː
Open		a aː	

- /ɛ, ɔ/ are heard as more closed [e, o] when occurring before glides /w, j/.

=== Phonotactics ===
Due to extensive syncope of vowels in both prefixes and original final syllables, Southeast Babar admits a wide variety of consonant clusters both in the onsets and codas of syllables. One stark example of permitted consonant clusters is xweapk "we (inclusive) speak".

Word-final clusters of a consonant followed by /j/ may be optionally subject to epenthesis, with a non-phonemic [ə] being inserted either between the two consonants or after them. Both schwa positions can be used by the same speaker in free variation.

== Phonological history ==
Southeast Babar is notable for its drastic phonetic reshapings of inherited Austronesian vocabulary, with extensive consonant loss, unusual reflexes of surviving consonants, and syncope and apocope of vowels. Many of these changes are outlined and exemplified by Hein Steinhauer as follows:

=== Changes to consonants ===
==== Consonant loss ====
Elision of consonants in all historical positions is extensive throughout Southeast Babar. Ancestral Proto-Malayo-Polynesian sounds like *p, *k, *q, *R, *h *j and *z were simply lost in Southeast Babar with some exceptions. Examples of consonant deletions include:

- *q
  - Initially: *qapuR > uir "chalk", *qatəluR > kely "egg".
  - Medially: *ma-qitem > mexm "black", ma-qudip > -mory "(a)live"
  - Finally: *tanaq > kal "soil", *buaq "fruit" > wu, *bunuq > -wuly "to kill".
- *h
  - *hikan > eːl "fish", *hapuy > uy "fire".
- *z
  - *zalan > al "road"
- *k
  - Initially: *kutu > oxy "louse", *kita > ixy "we (inclusive)", *kayu > ay "wood", *kaRat > -ax "to bite"
  - Medially: *i-kau > yow "you (sg. polite), *hikan > *ial > eːl "fish"
  - Finally: *burak > wo-wor "white", *tasik > kat "sea", *utak "brain" > ox "head"
- *R
  - Initially: *Rumaq > em "house"
  - Medially: *kaRat > -ax "to bite", *maRi > -moy "to come", *daRaq > ra "blood".
  - Finally: *qatəluR > kely "egg".
  - Preserved as r: *qapuR > uir "chalk", *ma-bəʀ(əq)at > berk "heavy"
- *p
  - Initially: *pitu > wo-exy "7", *punti "banana" > uty
  - Medially: *hapuy > uy "fire", *nipən > *liəl > lil "tooth"
  - Finally: ma-qudip > -mory "(a)live", *malip > -moly "laugh".
  - Preserved as p: *panas > pant "warm"
- *j
  - *qaləjaw > le "day", *ŋajan > non "name"
  - Preserved as r: *ijuŋ > irl "nose"

==== Chain shift of *s, *t, and *k ====
The loss of *k led to a pull chain shift. Subsequently, *t shifted to k except if the *t was directly preceded by original *n; unshifted *t before *n is known from *punti > uty "banana". In turn, k produced from *t lenited to /x/ unless the *k was:

- Word- or root-initial and followed by a vowel:
  - *tanaq > kal "soil", *ma-takut > mkak "afraid" (root *takut "to be afraid"), *təlu > wo-kely "3"
- Word-final when protected by a consonant that now immediately precedes the k due to syncope:
  - *laŋit > lalk "sky, heavens", *ma-bəʀ(əq)at > berk "heavy"

Lenited reflexes of *t > k > x include *teliŋa > xlil "ear", *mata > mox "eye", *ma-qitəm > mexm "black", *matay > -moxy "to die", *batu > waxy "stone", and *(h)əpat > wo-ax "4".

Afterwards, *s subsequently underwent fortition to t, with examples including:

- *sulu > tuly "torch"
- *susu > -tuty "milk"
- *asu > uty "dog".
- *panas > pant "warm"

==== Merger of *n, *ŋ and *l ====
The inherited Malayo-Polynesian nasal consonants *n and *ŋ merge with each other as *n, followed by a merger of that merged phoneme with *l, generally surfacing as /l/.

- *ta-kaən > *ka-an > kaːl "you and I eat"
- *teliŋa > xlil "ear"
- *nipən > *lipəl > *liəl > lil "tooth"
- *laŋit > lalk "sky, heavens".

Post-merger /l/ subsequently underwent an inverse development to n when adjacent to t either originating from *s or borrowed from another language. This circular development leads to roots and inflectional affixes to synchronically contain alternations between l and n.

- English bottle > Indonesian botol > Southeast Babar potn
- *panas > *palt > pant "hot" (intermediate *l preserved in reduplicated intensive derivative pal-pant "very hot")

A few cases of n failing to merge with l are known, mainly in monosyllabic words where, due to medial consonant deletion and resulting vowel coalescence, there is simultaneously there is one n in the onset and a second n in the coda.

- *ŋajan > non "name"
- *na-kaən > *na-an > noːn "(s)he eats"

Due to *nipən "tooth" surfacing as lil and not **nin, Steinhauer suggests that the loss of *p occurred after the loss of *j and *k.

==== Other consonants ====
*b and *d generally become w and r, merging with original *w and *r.

- Original *w and *r: *waiR > wey "water", *burak > wo-wor "white"
- Originally *b and *d: *batu > waxy "stone", *babuy > wawy "pig", *balik > -waly "to turn", *daləm > ralm "inside", *dua > ru "2"
- Irregularly unchanged *b: *ma-bəRat > berk "heavy"

=== Changes to vowels ===
==== Reduction and loss of final vowels ====
All word-final *ə and *a, whether inherited as word-final or secondarily word-final due to the loss of a following consonant, are deleted in Southeast Babar.

- Originally word-final: *lima > lim "hand", *mata > mox "eye", *dua > wu-ru "2"
- Secondarily word-final: *tanaq > *kala > kal "land", *dəŋəR > rel "to hear"

Word-final high vowels *-u and *-i generally reduce to the glide /j/. Like with *a, the loss of a following consonant will make the high vowel count as word-final for the purposes of this reduction.

- From *u: *batu > waxy "stone", *sulu > tuly "torch", *baqəRu > wa-way "new"
- From *i: *malip > -moly "to laugh", *balik > -waly "to turn", *waiR > wey "water"
- From *-ay: *matay > -moxy "to die"

==== Syncope of vowels between two consonants ====
Vowels often faced deletion in final syllables between two surviving consonants. Examples cited by Steinhauer include laŋit > lalk "heavens", *daləm > ralm "inside", *inum > *imun > -iml "to drink", *panas > pant "warm", and *matay > -moxy "to die".

==== Reflexes of *a ====
*a turns into u if it becomes the first phoneme of a word at any point in its evolution to Southeast Babar.

- Original word-initial *a: *asu > uty "dog", *ama > um "father"
- Secondarily word-initial *a: *hapuy > uy "fire", *qabu > uwy "ash"
- Exceptions: *zalan > al "road"

*a surfaces as o after nasal consonants. However, this change is blocked in the first-person singular of verbs, where a /j/ is infixed in the verbal root between the nasal and the vowel. Contrast:

- *ku-malip > i-myaly "I laugh" (rounding blocked by infixed -y-)
- *na-malip > l-moly "(s)he laughs" (with rounding after nasal).

If an *a is either not word-initial, not preceded by a nasal, or not subject to apocope or syncope, it will remain as a.

- Not word initial nor following a nasal: *daləm > ralm "inside", *babuy > wawy "pig"
- Not syncopated nor apocopated: *panas > pant "warm"

==== Reflexes of other vowels ====
*u remained as u unless before a syllable containing a non-high vowel, which lowered it to o. The difference in reflexes can be starkly contrasted with *buaq "fruit", which became the numeral prefix wu- or wo- depending on the vowel of the following numeral.

- With no lowering: wu-ru "2", wu-lim "5"
- With lowering: wo-kely "3", wo-ax "4", wo-lem "6"

*u also lowered to o before /x/, such as in *mutaq > mox "to vomit" and *kutu > oxy "louse".

*ə is often deleted in various places in trisyllabic words. However, if an *ə survives these deletions, it is reflected as e.

- Deleted: *təliŋa > xlil "ear", *baqəRu > wa-way "new"
- Surfaces as e: *dəŋəR > -rel "to hear", *ənəm > -lem "6", *təlu > -kely "3"

== Morphology ==
=== Morphophonological processes ===
Some conditioned sound changes have led to phonetic mutations of morphemes when subject to morphological processes, including affixation and reduplication.

==== Change of l to n before t ====
Southeast Babar morphemes ending in l generally change the l to n whenever it precedes a t.

- l- (3sg. verbal prefix) + -tol "to see" + tel (perfect particle) > nton tel "(s)he has seen"
- lewal "language" + toːl "our (inclusive)" > lewan toːl "our language"
- -tol "ill" > -tontol "very ill" (reduplicated)

==== Glide metathesis and insertion ====
On verbs whose roots end in the glide -y, the glide and the first consonant of the following morpheme undergo metathesis. For instance, l-moxy "(s)he dies" becomes lmox tyel "(s)he has died", with the y from the verb root and the t of the particle tel switching places.

The metathesis process also occurs when a morpheme ending in -y is reduplicated, such as -kary "to work" reduplicating to -karkyary "to be working".

The 1st-person singular, 2nd-person singular, and 2nd-person plural also trigger the insertion of a glide after the first consonant of the following verb stem; the presence of glide insertion is governed by the same restrictions as the application of glide metathesis.

Glide metathesis and insertion have some restrictions on their application.

- The morpheme the glide might move to or be inserted at cannot have a high vowel after its first consonant.
- The initial consonant of the next morpheme cannot be w.

If metathesis is blocked by one of these two restrictions, the glide is simply lost unless a vowel follows the glide.

If an original Malayo-Polynesian *a was rounded to o after a nasal in a base morpheme, the vowel is reverted to a if the nasal is subject to the glide metathesis or insertion process. The conjugation of -moly "to laugh" demonstrates this:

- Unreduplicated l-moly "(s)he laughs" and i-myaly "I laugh" (with glide insertion)
- Reduplicated l-molmyaly "(s)he keeps laughing" and i-myalmyaly "I keep laughing"

=== Verb conjugation ===
Southeast Babar verbs are conjugated for three grammatical persons (first, second, and third persons) and two grammatical numbers (singular and plural). First-person plural conjugation also distinguishes clusivity, with exclusive 1st-person plural excluding the addressee but the inclusive 1st-person plural including them. In addition, verbs can additionally inflect for at least three known grammatical aspects, namely perfect, progressive aspect, and inchoative aspect.

==== Person-number prefixes ====
Southeast Babar conjugates verbs for person and number via a series of prefixes attached to verb stems, either to an unmarked stem or the progressive stem.

There are two basic classes of person-number prefixes in the language. One class has the person-number prefixes all contain a vowel, and the other class where most of the prefixes do not. The prefixes for each class are as follows:

Southeast Babar person-number verbal markers
Person and number	Vocalic prefixes	Consonantal prefixes	Proto-forms (Note: Steinhauer posits that these proto-forms can only account directly for the consonantal prefixes, and finds it more difficult to envision how the vocalic prefixes can descend from these.)
1st sg.	o-	i- (Note: Inserts a glide after a following consonant if this consonant is not w nor is followed by a high vowel.)	*ku-
2nd sg.	mo-	m-	*mu-
3rd sg.	le-	l- (Note: Surfaces as n- in verbs whose stem begins with t, like n-tol "(s)he sees", and also in the irregular verb n-oːn "(s)he eats".)	*na-
1st pl. inclusive	ke-	x-	*ta-
1st pl. exclusive	me-	m-	*ma-
2nd pl.	mi-	m-	*mi-
3rd pl.	te-	t-	*sida-

==== Verbal aspect marking ====
A particle tel follows the conjugated verb to mark the perfect aspect. Another postverbal particle kay marks the inchoative aspect. The two particles can stack together to form an "inchoative perfect", so to speak. Steinbauer demonstrates the two particles with the following examples.

- lmoxy "(s)he dies"
- lmox tyel "(s)he has died"
- lmok kyay tyel "(s)he has already died"

Progressive aspect is expressed by a special verbal stem for each verb formed via reduplication of the verb root.

- lkary "(s)he works" > lkarkyary "(s)he is working"
- lmoly "(s)he laughs" > lmolmyaly "(s)he keeps laughing".
- Proto-Malayo-Polynesian *kaən > reduplicated *kakan > -kkol "is eating" (present -o:l ~ -a:l-)

=== Pronouns ===
The basic personal pronouns in Southeast Babar are:

Southeast Babar pronouns
		singular	plural
1st person	exclusive	um	am
1st person	inclusive	um	ixy
2nd person		(y)ow	miy
3rd person		iy	ity

=== Possessive markers ===
There are also at least two series of possessive markers, one series ending in u and another one ending in oːl. They all are stressed when attached to a possessed noun. Possessive markers documented by Steinhauer are first-person singular u and oːl, second-person singular mu and moːl, and first-person inclusive plural toːl.

Possessive markers follow the noun that is possessed. Examples of this behaviour include:

- u-series: ox u "my head", ox mu "your (sg.) head"
- oːl-series: lim oːl "my hand", lim moːl "your (sg.) hand", lewan toːl "our (incl.) language"

=== Numerals ===
Cardinal numerals from 2 to 9 have an obligatory prefix wu-/wo- that is derived from *buaq "fruit", which on the way to Southeast Babar evolved into a classifier and then a prefix.

The cardinals from 2-7 are given by Steinhauer as wu-ru "2", wo-kely "3", wo-ax "4", wu-lim "5", wo-lem "6", and wo-exy "7". Other numerals are only recorded in Taber's wordlist, including metl "1", wo-ka "8", wu-si "9", and wu-ki "10".
