= Imroing language =

Austronesian language spoken in Maluku, Indonesia

Imroing
- Native to: Indonesia
- Region: Maluku
- Native speakers: 560 (2007)
- Language family: Austronesian: Malayo-Polynesian (MP); Central–Eastern MP; Babar; South Babar; Southwest Babar; Imroing

Language codes
- ISO 639-3: imr
- Glottolog: imro1237

Imroing is an Austronesian language spoken in a single village on Babar Island in South Maluku, Indonesia.
