= Munggui language =

Language in Papua

Munggui
- Native to: Indonesia
- Region: Yapen Island
- Native speakers: (800 cited 1982)
- Language family: Austronesian: Malayo-Polynesian; Central–Eastern Malayo-Polynesian; Eastern Malayo-Polynesian; South Halmahera–West New Guinea; Cenderawasih Bay; Yapen; Central–Western; Central; Munggui

Language codes
- ISO 639-3: mth
- Glottolog: mung1269

Munggui is an Austronesian language spoken in Papua Province of Western New Guinea, northeastern Indonesia.
