= Emplawas language =

Austronesian language spoken in Maluku, Indonesia

Emplawas
- Native to: Indonesia
- Region: Maluku
- Native speakers: 250 (2007)
- Language family: Austronesian: Malayo-Polynesian (MP); (Central–Eastern MP); Babar; South Babar; Southwest Babar; Emplawas

Language codes
- ISO 639-3: emw
- Glottolog: empl1237
- ELP: Emplawas

Emplawas is an Austronesian language spoken in a single village on Babar Island in South Maluku, Indonesia.
