= Wabo language =

Austronesian Language of Indonesia

Wabo
- Woriasi
- Region: Yapen Island, Papua, Indonesia
- Native speakers: (1,500 cited 1987)
- Language family: Austronesian: Malayo-Polynesian; Central–Eastern Malayo-Polynesian; Eastern Malayo-Polynesian; South Halmahera–West New Guinea; Cenderawasih Bay; Yapen; Eastern; Wabo

Language codes
- ISO 639-3: wbb
- Glottolog: wabo1240

Wabo is a Malayo-Polynesian language of Papua, Indonesia.
