= DDW =

DDW may refer to:

- D.D. Williamson, a global food ingredient company
- Dartmouth Debate Workshop, a summer program
- Dutch Design Week is an annual event about design, hosted in Eindhoven
- Deuterium-depleted water, water with less heavy water than in natural water.

== See also ==
- ddw, ISO 639-3 code of the Dawera-Daweloor language of Indonesia
