= Babar languages =

Subgroup of the Austronesian language family

Babar
- Geographic distribution: Indonesia
- Linguistic classification: Austronesian: Malayo-Polynesian; Timor-Babar; Southwest Maluku; Babar
- Proto-language: Proto-Babar
- Subdivisions: Peripheral; South

Language codes
- Glottolog: baba1274

The Babar languages are a subgroup of the Austronesian language family spoken on the Babar Islands, Indonesia.

== Languages ==
- Peripheral: West Damar, Dawera-Daweloor, North Babar, Dai
- South:
  - Central Masela
  - Nuclear South Babar: East Masela, West Masela, Serili, Southeast Babar
    - Southwest Babar: Emplawas, Imroing, Tela-Masbuar

== Proto-language ==
Proto-Babar was first reconstructed by Grimes & Edwards (2026).

Proto-Babar	Proto-South Babar	Gloss
*kami	*ʔami	'1pl.excl'
*kita		'1pl.incl'
*au	*ai	'1sg'
*ou	*owu	'2sg'
	*lim	'arm, hand'
*(li)-awi/*(li)-awu	*awi	'ash, dust'
*or	*or	'bamboo'
*(wa)riʈ		'bathe'
*har	*har	'betel pepper'
*manu	*mani(an)/*mani(en)	'bird'
*metem		'black'
*raya		'blood'
*yai	*yai	'boat'
*rui		'bone'
*tuni	*kuni	'burn, roast'
*ʈaŋa		'branch'
*ʈuʈu		'breast'
*an/*ana	*an	'child'
*tilu		'deaf'
*aʈu		'dog'
*waya		'dry in sun'
*tliŋa	*klil	'ear'
*kaka	*ʔaka	'elder sibling'
*teli		'egg'
*mata	*mak/*muka	'eye'
*tei	*kei	'feces'
	*om	'fingernail'
*ai	*ai	'fire'
*ikan	*ian	'fish'
*lima		'five'
*wu-		'fruit'
*niki	*ni	'fruit bat'
*peni	*peni	'full'
*tiŋa		'garden'
*moho		'green'
*wulu		'hair'
*kutu	*oka	'head'
*ulu		'head'
	*ren	'hear'
*uma/*yuma	*yum	'house'
*ira		'how much'
*buni	*buni	'kill'
*tur	*kur	'knee'
*utu/*kutu	*oki	'louse'
*mani/*mayuni	*oi mani	'man'
*wur		'mountain'
*nuru	*nor	'mouth'
*ŋan	*nan	'name'
*wari		'new'
*irn		'nose'
*meʈ(en)		'one'
*halan	*haln	'path'
*uhan		'rain'
*wiay		'root'
*eni	*ini	'sand'
*iti		'seven'
*nemo		'six'
*nie	*nie	'snake'
*tani		'soil'
*tun	*kun	'star'
*laya		'sun'
*maʈu		'smoke'
*ʔapun	*ʔap(e)n	'stomach'
*watu	*waki	'stone'
*wenaŋui	*-wenani	'swim'
*iur/*iru		'tail'
*ŋiʈ/*ŋiʈi		'teeth'
*wuti		'ten'
*riwin	*riwen(i)	'thousand'
*teli		'three'
*nama	*nam	'tongue'
*nin	*lil/*nin	'tooth'
*muta	*muku	'vomit'
*wey		'water'
*ʈai		'who'
*aŋin	*anni	'wind'
*(m)nu	*mno	'wound'
*wayi		'younger sibling'
