= Tandia language =

Extinct language in Papua

Tandia
- Native to: Indonesia
- Region: West Papua
- Extinct: 2002
- Language family: Austronesian: Malayo-Polynesian; Central–Eastern Malayo-Polynesian; Eastern Malayo-Polynesian; South Halmahera–West New Guinea; Tandia

Language codes
- ISO 639-3: tni
- Glottolog: tand1253
- ELP: Tandia

Tandia is a recently extinct Austronesian language. Most speakers have shifted to Wandamen. In 1991, there were worldwide only two speakers of Tandia, both of whom lived just south of the Wohsimi River on the Wandamen Peninsula, Irian Jaya Province, Indonesia. It was confirmed to be a living language in 2009, but, by 2024, it was found to have gone extinct by a linguistic survey team.

It was a primary branch of the South Halmahera–West New Guinea languages.
