= Waropen =

Waropen may be,

- Waropen Regency
- Waropen language
