= Yerisiam language =

Austronesian language spoken in Indonesia

Yerisiam
- Iresim
- gúà árínà
- Native to: Indonesia
- Region: Nabire, Central Papua
- Native speakers: (70 cited 2000)
- Language family: Austronesian: Malayo-Polynesian; Central–Eastern Malayo-Polynesian; Eastern Malayo-Polynesian; South Halmahera–West New Guinea; Cenderawasih Bay; Southwestern; Yaur–Yerisiam; Yerisiam

Language codes
- ISO 639-3: ire
- Glottolog: ires1239
- ELP: Iresim
- Location within Western New Guinea
- Coordinates: 3.63°S 135.03°E

Yerisiam or Iresim is an Austronesian language in the Cenderawasih (Geelvink Bay) language group of Indonesian Papua. It is closely related to Yaur and more distantly to Umar.
