= Serui-Laut language =

Language

Serui-Laut
- Arui
- Native to: Indonesia
- Region: Papua (Yapen Island and Ambai Islands)
- Native speakers: (1,200 cited 1987)
- Language family: Austronesian: Malayo-Polynesian; Central–Eastern Malayo-Polynesian; Eastern Malayo-Polynesian; South Halmahera–West New Guinea; Cenderawasih Bay; Yapen; Central–Western; Central; Serui-Laut

Language codes
- ISO 639-3: seu
- Glottolog: seru1244

Serui-Laut, or Arui, is an Austronesian language spoken on Serui Island of the Ambai Islands, in Western New Guinea, Indonesia.

Serui Island is located in Cenderawasih Bay of Papua Province.

It is one of the Yapen languages, in the South Halmahera–West New Guinea languages group.
