= Dusner language =

Endangered Austronesian language of Indonesia

Dusner
- Native to: West Papua, Indonesia
- Region: Cenderawasih Bay
- Native speakers: 3 (2011)
- Language family: Austronesian: Malayo-Polynesian; Central–Eastern Malayo-Polynesian; Eastern Malayo-Polynesian; South Halmahera–West New Guinea; Cenderawasih Bay; Biakic; Dusner

Language codes
- ISO 639-3: dsn
- Glottolog: dusn1237
- ELP: Dusner
- Dusner is classified as Critically Endangered by the UNESCO Atlas of the World's Languages in Danger.

- Location within Western New Guinea Location within Indonesia Location within Southeast Asia
- Coordinates: 2.74°S 134.39°E

Dusner is a language spoken in the village of Dusner in the province of West Papua, Indonesia. Dusner is highly endangered, and has been reported to have just three remaining speakers.

== Sociolinguistic situation ==
The language is highly endangered with only three speakers reported to be remaining. In 2011, researchers from Oxford University's Faculty of Linguistics, Philology and Phonetics began a project to document the vocabulary and grammar of the language, in collaboration with UNIPA (State University of Papua) and UNCEN (Cenderawasih University, Papua). The project outputs were a vocabulary, a published grammar, and a website documenting the language.

== Phonology ==
The phoneme inventory of Dusner consists of five vowels and 19 consonants (five of which are only attested in loanwords from Indonesian/Papuan Malay).

Vowels
	front	back
high	i	u
mid	e	o
low		a

Consonants
		labial	alveolar	palatal	velar	glottal
nasal		m	n	(ɲ)	ŋ	
plosive/ affricate	voiceless	p	t	(t͡ʃ)	k	
plosive/ affricate	voiced	b	d	(d͡ʒ)	g	
fricative		β	s			(h)
liquid			r (l)			
glide		w		j		

(Phonemes in parentheses in the table are only attested in loanwords from Papuan Malay)

There is no tone in the language. The phonology of the language has a high number of complex syllable onsets, some of them contravening the Sonority Sequencing Principle.
