= Woi language =

Austronesian language spoken in Indonesia

Woi
- Region: Papua (Yapen Island)
- Native speakers: 1,800 (2012)
- Language family: Austronesian: Malayo-Polynesian; Central–Eastern Malayo-Polynesian; Eastern Malayo-Polynesian; South Halmahera–West New Guinea; Cenderawasih Bay; Yapen; Central–Western; Woi

Language codes
- ISO 639-3: wbw
- Glottolog: woii1237
- ELP: Woi

Woi (Wooi) is a Malayo-Polynesian language of Papua, Indonesia mainly spoken in the villages of Wooi and Woinap on Yapen Island and the village of Yenuari on Moisnum Island.
