= Yapen languages (Austronesian) =

Branch of the Austronesian language family

Yapen
- Geographic distribution: Yapen Island, Western New Guinea, Indonesia
- Linguistic classification: Austronesian: Malayo-Polynesian; Central–Eastern; South Halmahera–West New Guinea; Cenderawasih Bay; Yapen
- Proto-language: Proto-Yapen
- Subdivisions: Eastern; Western

Language codes
- Glottolog: yape1249
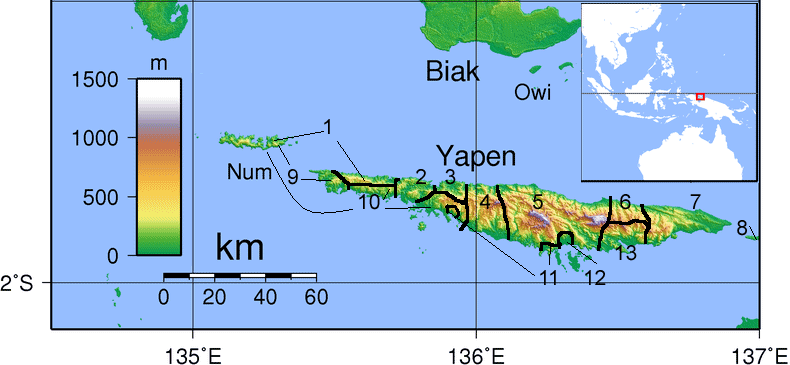

The Yapen languages are the branch of Malayo-Polynesian languages spoken on Yapen Island and the nearby small islands in Cenderawasih Bay, all in Papua province of northeastern Indonesia.

They share Yapen Ιsland with the Papuan Yawa languages.

== Historical morphology ==
Reconstructions of subject markers and inalienable possessive markers for Yapen proto-languages according to Kamholz (2015). Note that V = vocalic conjugation, C = consonantal conjugation:

Proto-Yapen:

1sg.	*y- (V), *ya- (C)	1pl.	*t- (incl.), *am- (excl.)
2sg.	*bu- (V), *-u- (C)	2pl.	*m-
3sg.	*dy- (V), *-i- (C)	3pl.	*si-

1sg.	*-ku, *-ni	1pl.	*ta-...-mi (incl.), *ama-...-mi (excl.)
2sg.	*-mu	2pl.	*mi-...-mi
3sg.	*-n-pai	3pl.	*si-...-mi

Proto-Western Yapen (Proto-Central–Western Yapen):

1sg.	*y- (V), *ya- (C)	1pl.	*tat- (incl.), *amat- (excl.)
2sg.	*bu- (V), *-u- (C)	2pl.	*met-
3sg.	*dy- (V), *-i- (C)	3pl.	*set-

1sg.	*-ku, *-ni	1pl.	*ta-...-mi (incl.), *ama-...-mi (excl.)
2sg.	*-mu	2pl.	*me-...-mi
3sg.	*-n-pai, *-na-ni	3pl.	*se-...-mi

Proto-Central Yapen:

1sg.	*y- (V), *ya- (C)	1pl.	*tat- (incl.), *amat- (excl.)
2sg.	*w- (V), *-u- (C)	2pl.	*met-
3sg.	*dy- (V), *-i- (C)	3pl.	*et-

1sg.	*-u, *-ni	1pl.	*ta-...-mi (incl.), *ama-...-mi (excl.)
2sg.	*-mu	2pl.	*me-...-mi
3sg.	*-nempai, *-na-ni	3pl.	*se-...-mi

Proto-Eastern Yapen:

1sg.	*ay- (V), *a- (C)	1pl.	*t- (incl.), *nam- (excl.)
2sg.	*b- (V), *-u- (C)	2pl.	*mi-
3sg.	*d- (V), *-i- (C)	3pl.	*si-

1sg.	*ai-	1pl.	*ta- (incl.), *na- (excl.)
2sg.	*me-	2pl.	*mi-
3sg.	*ne-	3pl.	*si-

== Languages ==
From Kamholz (2024):

- Yapen
  - Western Yapen (Central–Western Yapen)
    - Ambai
    - Ansus
    - Marau
    - Wandamen
    - Woi
    - Central Yapen
      - Munggui
      - Pom
      - Papuma
      - Serui-Laut
      - Busami
  - Eastern Yapen
    - Kurudu
    - Wabo

== Proto-Western Yapen ==
Proto-Western Yapen
- Proto-Central-Western Yapen
- Reconstruction of: Western Yapen languages
- Region: Western Yapen Island
- Era: around 2000 years ago
- Reconstructed ancestors: Proto-Austronesian: Proto-Malayo-Polynesian; Proto-Eastern Malayo-Polynesian; Proto-SHWNG; Proto-Cenderawasih Bay; Proto-Yapen

Proto-Western Yapen, also known as Proto-Central-Western Yapen, was reconstructed in 1983 by P.J. Silzer, with further amendments by Usher and Gasser (in preparation).

Vowels
	Front	Central	Back
Close	*i		*u
Close-mid	*e	*ə	*o
Open		*a	

Consonants
	Bilabial	Alveolar	Palatal	Velar
Stop	*p, b	*t, d		*k
Nasal	*m	*n		*ŋ (?)
Fricative	*β	*s, *S		*x
Rhotic		*r		
Approximant	*w		*j	
Unclear	*P, *B	*D		

Lexical reconstructions mentioned in Gasser and Benesch (2025):

Proto-Western Yapen	Gloss
*βəβo	'above, top'
*inapa	'beach, shore'
*kaBaru[r]	'bean'
*man	'bird'
*woinai	'bowl/bucket'
*=nunum	'to burn, cook'
*wa	'canoe'
*aNtum[a]	'child'
*arixaN	'child'
*=tara	'to chop or pound sago'
*sur	'comb'
*=sur	'to comb'
*təbura	'conch shell/trumpet'
*tau[i]n	'cooked/dried sago'
*ano	'cross-cousin'
*mararu	'type of cooking pot'
*ur[u]n	'type of cooking pot'
*=unum	'to drink'
*=an	'to eat'
*iai	'father'
*tama	'father, father's brother'
*βaβin	'female, woman'
*=mun	'to fight'
*adia	'fire'
*dian	'fish'
*taraN	'type of fish harpoon or spear'
*=pot	'to fish with a line'
*jer	'type of fish poison'
*ne una	'fish scales'
*se	'type of fish trap'
*maraiN	'fishing line'
*sarəper	'fishing line'
*buoN	'fruit'
*pi mun-a	'game, prey'
*Busa(r)	'gray, white'
*ruai	'grill, rack for roasting'
*[o/u]tin	'hundred'
*sawan	'husband'
*inoi	'knife'
*=məri	'to laugh'
*=rep	'to lick, taste'
*kaβui	'loincloth'
*sur	'louse'
*muan	'male, man'
*=[r]aut	'to marry, be married'
*tawan	'matoa (Pometia pinnata)'
*s[i/e]na	'mother, mother's sister'
*diru	'night'
*pəreN	'nipa palm'
*maniN	'oil'
*su	'papeda/sago porridge'
*=mopar	'to poison fish'
*=iSin	'to prepare papeda/sago porridge'
*=ram[i/u][s]	'to rinse/squeeze sago'
*anaN	'sago'
*parari	'sago frond'
*amau	'sago pounder'
*aro	'sago swamp'
*kawein[i]	'shrimp'
*raruo	'sibling'
*amai	'sibling-in-law'
*morir	'spinefoot fish (Siganus sp.)'
*=iSan	'to stab'
*=osar	'to stand (up), wake up'
*=as	'to swim'
*ma-muta	'to vomit'
*a-mun-a	'war'
*pi ma-mun-a	'weapon'
