= Mor language =

Mor language may refer to:

- Mor language (Papuan)
- Mor language (Austronesian)
