= South Halmahera–West New Guinea languages =

Subgroup of the Austronesian language family

South Halmahera–West New Guinea
- Geographic distribution: The southern part of the islands of North Maluku in the Halmahera Sea, and the regions bordering Cenderawasih Bay, in Indonesian Papua
- Linguistic classification: Austronesian: Malayo-Polynesian; Central–Eastern Malayo-Polynesian; Eastern Malayo-Polynesian; South Halmahera–West New Guinea
- Proto-language: Proto-South Halmahera–West New Guinea (Proto-SHWNG)
- Subdivisions: Tandia; Mor; Waropen; Raja Ampat–South Halmahera; Cenderawasih Bay; ? Lower Mamberamo (perhaps Papuan)

Language codes
- Glottolog: sout3229
- The South Halmahera–West New Guinea languages (red), with map names in French. The group at left is the Raja Ampat–South Halmahera languages; the one at right is the Cenderawasih Bay. (The black line is the Wallace Line.)

The South Halmahera–West New Guinea (SHWNG) languages are a branch of the Malayo-Polynesian languages, found in the islands and along the shores of the Halmahera Sea in the Indonesian province of North Maluku and of Cenderawasih Bay in the provinces of Papua and West Papua. There are 38 languages.

The unity of the South Halmahera–West New Guinea subgroup is well supported by lexical and phonological evidence. Blust (1978) has proposed that they are most closely related to the Oceanic languages, but this classification is not universally accepted.

Most of the languages are only known from short word lists, but Buli, Patani and Taba on Halmahera, Ambel on Raja Ampat, and Biak, Wamesa, Wooi, and Waropen in Cenderawasih Bay, are fairly well attested.

== Classification ==
Traditionally, the languages are classified into two geographic groups:

- South Halmahera languages (along the southeastern coast of Halmahera, plus one language in the east of the Bomberai Peninsula).
- West New Guinea languages (on the Raja Ampat Islands west of New Guinea, and the islands and shoreline of Cenderawasih Bay).

The unity of the South Halmahera and Raja Ampat languages is supported by phonological changes noted in Blust (1978) and Remijsen (2002). This results in the following structure:

- Cenderawasih Bay
- Raja Ampat–South Halmahera (RASH) (South Halmahera, in the sea between Halmahera and New Guinea, and Raja Ampat off the western tip of New Guinea)

David Kamholz (2014) includes these languages as additional branches:

- Lower Mamberamo (sometimes also considered to be Papuan, and may be of mixed Austronesian and Papuan origin)
- Mor
- Tandia
- Waropen

The following language groups are problematic – they may or may not be SHWNG. Kamholz (2014) does not classify them due to lack of data. Grimes & Edwards include them with the Kei–Tanimbar languages, and Kamholz (2024) does not list them as part of SHWNG.

- Irarutu–Nabi: Irarutu, Kuri (Nabi)
- Bedoanas–Erokwanas: Arguni, Bedoanas, Erokwanas

Although the Kowiai language is considered part of SHWNG in Blust's Austronesian Comparative Dictionary, it is not listed as such by Kamholz (2024). Grimes & Edwards include Kowiai within the Seram Laut group.

- Kowiai

=== Kamholz (2014, 2024) ===
The SHWNG languages can be categorized as follows (Kamholz 2014: 136-141, Kamholz 2024: 183):

- South Halmahera–West New Guinea (SHWNG)
  - Tandia
  - Moor
  - Waropen
  - Warembori (sometimes considered non-Austronesian)
  - Yoke (sometimes considered non-Austronesian)
  - Raja Ampat–South Halmahera
    - Ambel
    - Biga
    - Salawati (including the Fiawat dialect)
    - As
    - Ma'ya-Matbat
      - Ma'ya
      - Matbat
    - South Halmahera
      - Gebe
      - Central-Eastern South Halmahera
        - Buli
        - Maba
        - Patani
        - Sawai
      - Southern South Halmahera
        - Gane
        - Taba
  - Nuclear Cenderawasih Bay
    - Biakic
      - Biak (Numfor)
      - Dusner
      - Meoswar
      - Roon
    - Yapen
      - Western Yapen (Central–Western Yapen)
        - Ambai
        - Ansus
        - Marau
        - Wandamen
        - Woi
        - Central Yapen
          - Munggui
          - Pom
          - Papuma
          - Serui-Laut
          - Busami
      - Eastern Yapen
        - Kurudu
        - Wabo
    - Southwest Cenderawasih Bay
      - Umar
      - Yaur-Yerisiam
        - Yaur
        - Yerisiam

Kamholz (2014) presumes the homeland of proto-SHWNG to be the southern coast of the Cenderawasih Bay, around 3,500 years ago.

Kamholz (2024) revises the tree shown above, separating Ambel-Biga into two primary branches of RASH.

== Typology ==
At least six SHWNG languages, namely Ma'ya, Matbat, Ambel, Moor, Yaur, and Yerisiam, are tonal. Klamer, et al. (2008) suggest that tone in these SHWNG languages originated from contact with Papuan languages of the Raja Ampat Islands that are now extinct. There are few lexical similarities with present-day Papuan languages, except for a few words such as 'sago' that are shared with the two tonal Papuan isolates Abun and Mpur (both spoken on the north coast of the Bird's Head Peninsula):

- bi^{H} (Ma'ya)
- bei (Abun)
- bi^{L} (Mpur)

However, Arnold (2018) traces this etymology to Proto-Malayo-Polynesian *Rambia 'sago palm'.

Arnold (2018) reconstructs tone for Proto-Ma'ya-Matbat and Proto-Ambel, but not for Proto-SHWNG. Other than tonogenesis, these proto-languages had also gone through monosyllabization through apocope.

The VRK Mutation is characteristic of most SHWNG languages (except for the RASH languages), where the phonemes /β/, /r/, and /k/ surface as the prenasalized voiced stops [mb], [nd], and [ŋg] in various cluster environments. The mutation is found in the Ambai, Ansus, Biak, Busami, Dusner, Kurudu, Marau, Meoswar, Moor, Munggui, Papuma, Pom, Roon, Roswar (possibly equivalent to Meoswar), Serewen (possibly a dialect of Pom), Serui-Laut, Umar, Wamesa, Warembori, Waropen, Wooi, Yaur, Yerisiam, and Yoke languages.

Kamholz notes that SHWNG languages have relatively low lexical retention rates from Proto-Malayo-Polynesian, pointing to significant influence from non-Austronesian Papuan languages.

== Historical morphology ==
Reconstruction of subject markers and inalienable possessive markers for Proto-South Halmahera–West New Guinea according to Kamholz (2015). Note that V = vocalic conjugation, C = consonantal conjugation:

| 1sg. | *y-, *ya- (V), *k-, *-y- (C) | 1pl. | *t- (incl.), *am- (excl.) |
| 2sg. | *aw- (V), *a- (C) | 2pl. | *m- |
| 3sg. | *y- (V), *i- (C) | 3pl. | *si- |

| 1sg. | *-ku | 1pl. | *-nd, *ta- (incl.), *-mami? (excl.) |
| 2sg. | *-mu | 2pl. | *-meu? |
| 3sg. | *-∅ | 3pl. | *-ndri, *si- |

== Lexical reconstructions ==
Reconstruction of lexemes found in Proto-South Halmahera–West New Guinea according to Arnold (2025).

| Proto-SHWNG | Gloss |
|---|---|
| *Ropak | 'to fly' |
| *maoti | 'low tide' |

Reconstruction of innovative lexemes found in Proto-South Halmahera–West New Guinea according to Kamholz (2024).

| Proto-SHWNG | Gloss |
|---|---|
| *aka | 'bite' |
| *alai, *salai | 'dig' |
| *am, *em | 'see' |
| *as | 'swim' |
| *asan | 'sun; day' |
| *ata | 'to smoke (food)' |
| *ba | 'big' |
| *bisik | 'sick' |
| *bus | 'white' |
| *dum | 'drink' |
| *el | 'mountain' |
| *iap | 'k.o. brown fish' |
| *katem | 'one' |
| *lali | 'dirty' |
| *lan | 'song' |
| *le | 'land(ward)' |
| *ma-lom | 'wet' |
| *ma-sun | 'heavy' |
| *tuat | 'buy' |
| *una | 'know' |
| *utin | 'hundred' |

Reconstruction of numerals in Proto-South Halmahera–West New Guinea according to Barlow (2022).

| Proto-SHWNG | Gloss |
|---|---|
| *asa, *esa, *isa | 'one' |
| *duha (= PMP *duha) | 'two' |
| *tolu | 'three' |
| *pat | 'four' |
| *lima | 'five' |
| *onəm | 'six' |
| *pitu | 'seven' |
| *walu | 'eight' |
| *siwa | 'nine' |
