= Roon language =

Language in Papua

Roon
- Native to: Indonesia
- Region: Roon Island, west Cenderawasih Bay
- Native speakers: (1,100 cited 1993)
- Language family: Austronesian: Malayo-Polynesian; Central–Eastern Malayo-Polynesian; Eastern Malayo-Polynesian; South Halmahera–West New Guinea; Cenderawasih Bay; Biakic; Roon

Language codes
- ISO 639-3: rnn
- Glottolog: roon1237
- Coordinates: 2.43°S 134.56°E

Roon (Ron) is an Austronesian language spoken in West Papua Province, Indonesia.

== Distribution ==
Roon people reside in Yende, Niab, Inday, Sariay, Syabes, and Mena villages of Roon District, Teluk Wondama Regency.
