= Serili language =

Austronesian language spoken in Maluku, Indonesia

Serili
- Native to: Indonesia
- Region: Maluku
- Native speakers: (330 cited 1980)
- Language family: Austronesian: Malayo-Polynesian (MP); Central–Eastern MP; Babar; South Babar; Masela–Southeast; Serili

Language codes
- ISO 639-3: sve
- Glottolog: seri1255
- ELP: Serili

Serili is an Austronesian language spoken on Marsela Island in South Maluku, Indonesia.
