= MXZ =

MXZ or mxz may refer to:

- MXZ, the IATA code for Meixian Airport, Guangdong, China
- mxz, the ISO 639-3 code for Central Masela language, Indonesia
