= Dai language (Austronesian) =

Austronesian language spoken in Southwest Maluku, Indonesia

Dai
- Native to: Indonesia
- Region: Southwest Maluku
- Native speakers: 820 (2007)
- Language family: Austronesian: Malayo-Polynesian (MP); Central–Eastern MP; Babar; North Babar; Dai

Language codes
- ISO 639-3: dij
- Glottolog: daii1240

Dai is a minor Austronesian language spoken on Dai Island in Southwest Maluku, Indonesia.
