= Warembori language =

Language of Papua, Indonesia, of uncertain affiliation

Warembori
- Waremboivoro
- Pronunciation: [ˈwaɾɛmboiβoɾo]
- Native to: Indonesia
- Region: Warembori village, Mamberamo Hilir District, Mamberamo Raya Regency, Papua
- Native speakers: (600 cited 1998)
- Language family: Lower Mamberamo: Warembori

Language codes
- ISO 639-3: wsa
- Glottolog: ware1253
- ELP: Warembori

Warembori (native name Waremboivoro) is a moribund language spoken by about 600 people in Warembori village, Mamberamo Hilir District, Mamberamo Raya Regency, located around river mouths (including the mouth of the Warembari River) on the north coast of Papua, Indonesia.

== Classification ==
Classification is in dispute. Mark Donohue thinks it is related to Yoke, forming together the Lower Mamberamo family. On a 200 word list, they share 33%. Also there are some grammar similarities. According to Donohue, Warembori is heavily influenced by Austronesian languages to the west, in both vocabulary and grammar, Yoke is less influenced by them. More recent researchers (Dunn & Reesink, Foley, Kamholz) have classified Warembori and Yoke as papuanised Austronesian languages. Malcolm Ross leaves Yoke unclassified due to lack of data, apparently referring to the fact that Donohue did not publish independent pronouns in Yoke. He did publish subject prefixes on verbs, which are very similar to Warembori, and the singular prefixes are also remarkably similar to two Kwerba family languages, namely Kauwera and Airoran, suggesting either borrowing or a distant relationship to Kwerba, though the Kwerba family shares almost no vocabulary with the Lower Mamberamo family. The Lower Mamberamo plural prefixes are similar to Austronesian, as are the plural object suffixes and, at least in Warembori, plural independent pronouns.

Kamholz (2024) and Glottolog both classify Warembori and Yoke as Austronesian, more specifically primary branches of South Halmahera–West New Guinea.

== Phonology ==
=== Vowels ===
	Front	Back
High	i	u
Mid	e	o
Low	a	

=== Consonants ===
		Bilabial	Alveolar	Palatal	Velar
Stop	Voiceless	p	t		k
Stop	Voiced	b	d		k
Stop	“Heavy”	ˀb	ˀd		
Nasal	Voiced	m	n		
Nasal	“Heavy”	ˀm	ˀn		
Fricative		(β)	s		
Rhotic			(r)		
Semivowel		w		j	

The sequence /nk/ is realized as [ŋɡ].

The light voiced stops /b d/ lenite to [β r] between vowels within a word. The heavy stops do not lenite.

When a nasal is followed by a heavy plosive, it is lengthened, i.e. /mˀb/ [mːb] /nˀd/ [nːd]. When not followed by a stop, heavy nasals are long and preceded by a glottal closure, i.e. /ˀm/ [ʔmː] /ˀn/ [ʔnː]. Heavy consonants also attract stress.

Some minimal pairs of heavy consonants are:

- bo 'mouth', ˀbo 'thorn'
- ane 'crocodile', aˀne 'jungle'

== Grammar ==
The independent pronouns are:

	sg.	du.	pl.
Incl.	iwi	amui	ami
Excl.	iwi	kui	ki
2	awi	mui	mi
3	yi	tui	ti

The dual pronouns are derived from the plural via the infix ⟨u⟩. This parallels the nearby Austronesian Cenderawasih languages, which derive the dual from the plural with du or ru, from *duSa 'two'. The plural pronouns ami, ki, mi, ti, in turn, appear to be Austronesian in origin, from *kami, *kita, *kamiu, *sida (the latter via *tira). Although 3sg yi might also derive from Austronesian *ia, 1sg iwi and 2sc awi, the most basic pronouns, have no parallel in Austronesian. However, the basic pronouns iwi, awi, yi, ki, mi, ti resemble Yoke eβu, aβu, iβu, kiβu, miβu, siβu, illustrating the strong Austronesian influence on both languages.

Possessive prefixes on nouns are nearly identical to subject prefixes on verbs. The object suffixes are also similar; the paradigm is very close to that of Yoke, apart from an inclusive-exclusive distinction which is not completely grammaticalized in the case of possessives.

	Possessive	Subject	Object
1sg	e-	i-, e-, ja-	-ewi, -e(o)
2sg	a-	u-, wa-, a-	-awi, -a(o)
3sg	i-, ∅-	i-, ja- ∅-	-i, -i(o)
1ex	ami	ami-, ama-, ame-	-mo, -m(o)
1in	ki-, ke-	ki-, ka-, ke-	-ki, -k(o)
2pl	mi-, me-	mi-, ma-, me-	-mi, -m(o)
3pl	ti-, te-	ti-, ta-, te-	-ti, -t(o)

The singular prefixes of Warembori and Yoke are nearly identical to the 1sg e-, 2sg a-, 3sg i- of the Kwerba languages Kauwera and Airoran. However, Kwerba has no more basic vocabulary in common with the Lower Mamberamo family than what is expected by chance.

== Writing system ==
Warembori is written in a Latin alphabet based on the Indonesian. It represents phonetic, rather than phonemic, distinctions. In particular:

- /b/ [β] is written v
- /d/ [r] is written r
- /nk/ [ŋɡ] is written ngg
