= MVX =

MVX or mvx may refer to:

- Meoswar language (ISO 639-3: mvx), an Austronesian language of Cenderawasih Bay in West Papua province, Indonesia
- Minvoul Airport (IATA: MVX), an airport in the Woleu-Ntem Province of Gabon
- Midvalley Express, a bus rapid transit line in Salt Lake County, Utah
