= Arui =

Arui may refer to:

- Arui, an alternate name for the Serui-Laut language
- Arui, a name in Libya for the Barbary sheep
