= DIJ =

DIJ or dij can refer to:

- Death in June, an English neofolk band
- Driggs–Reed Memorial Airport, an airport in Driggs, Idaho, U.S.
- Dai language (Austronesian), an Austronesian language spoken in Dai Island, Indonesia, by ISO 639 code
- German Institute for Japanese Studies, a research institute
- Distal interphalangeal joints, part of the interphalangeal joints of the hand
