= Macroglossum paukstadtorum =

Scientific classification
- Kingdom: Animalia
- Phylum: Arthropoda
- Class: Insecta
- Order: Lepidoptera
- Family: Sphingidae
- Genus: Macroglossum
- Species: M. paukstadtorum

Binomial name
- Macroglossum paukstadtorum Eitschberger, 2005

Species of moth

Macroglossum paukstadtorum is a moth of the family Sphingidae. It is known from the Babar Islands.
