= Yaur people =

Yaur
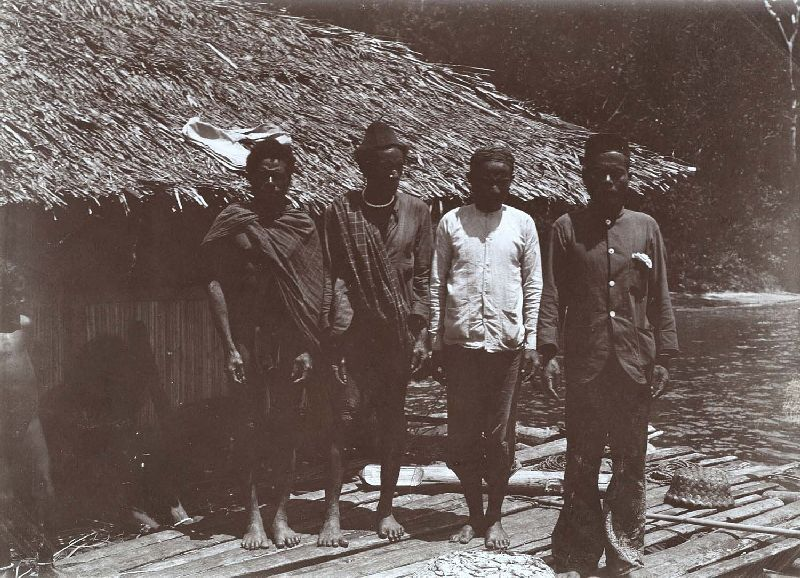
- Portrait of a four men in Kwatisore, including a Korano (village head) and a guide

Total population
- 700

Regions with significant populations
- Northern coastal of Nabire Regency

Languages
- Yaur; Papuan Malay (lingua franca)

Religion
- Christianity, indigenous religion (majority), Islam (minority)

Related ethnic groups
- Yerisiam • Wate • Umari

Yaur is one of the ethnic groups that live in the northern coastal area of Yaur District, Nabire Regency. The area inhabited by the Yaur people falls within the Saireri customary territory, which includes the northern coast of Nabire, Biak, and Yapen.

== Economy ==
The Yaur are hunter-gatherers. They hunt Monitor lizard in Waroromi Valley during the fruit season for the skin and meat because lizards are ubiquitous at fruit trees looking for preys. After hunting, the skins are utilized for tifa and wall furniture production, while the smoked meats are sold in the Nabire market.

== Language ==
Yaur or Jaur is a language that belongs to the Cenderawasih (Geelvink Bay) language family, a branch of the Austronesian language family that is spoken in Central Papua Province, Indonesia. This language has about 300 speakers.
