= Biak language =

Austronesian language spoken in Indonesia

Biak
- Biak-Numfor
- wós Vyak, wós Kovedi
- Native to: Indonesia
- Region: Biak Islands; Biak Numfor Regency; Supiori Regency
- Ethnicity: Biak people
- Native speakers: 70,000 (2007)
- Language family: Austronesian: Malayo-Polynesian; Central–Eastern Malayo-Polynesian; Eastern Malayo-Polynesian; South Halmahera–West New Guinea; Cenderawasih Bay; Biakic; Biak
- Writing system: Latin

Language codes
- ISO 639-3: bhw
- Glottolog: biak1248
- ELP: Biak
- location of Biak island Biak language (Indonesia) Biak language (Southeast Asia)
- Coordinates: 0.95°S 135.88°E

Biak (wós Vyak or 'Biak language'; wós kovedi or 'our language'; Indonesian: bahasa Biak), also known as Biak-Numfor, Noefoor, Mafoor, Mefoor, Nufoor, Mafoorsch, Myfoorsch and Noefoorsch, is an Austronesian language of the South Halmahera-West New Guinea subgroup of the Eastern Malayo-Polynesian languages.

According to Ethnologue, it is spoken by about 70,000 people in Biak and Numfor and numerous small islands in the Schouten Islands, located in Papua province of Western New Guinea, northeastern Indonesia.

== Name ==
The name Biak or Vyak refers to the island of the same name. It probably comes from an earlier form *Bat, which is argued to have meant "the ground under one's feet, land" in Proto-Austronesian via the regular change of *t to k. This is supported by the Ambel cognate Báyt.

== Dialects ==
There are a number of different dialects of Biak spoken on various different islands, the most well-known being Biak-Numfoor, spoken on the island of Numfoor. These dialect differences are minor and mostly limited to slight regular sound changes. The vast majority of Biak speakers are also fluent in the local variety of Malay, but not all of them are proficient in standard Indonesian.

Geographical distributions of Biak dialects within Raja Ampat Regency (Ronsumbre 2020):

Betew dialect

- Waigeo Selatan District: Saonek, Saporkren, Yenbeser, Yenwaupur, Sawinggrai, Kapisawar, and Arborek villages.
- Waigeo Barat District: Mutus, Biantsyi, Waisilip, Manyaifun, Meos Manggara, and Pam villages.
- Kofiau District: Deer, Balal, and Tolobi villages.
- Misool District: Pulau Tikus, Solol, Meos Kapal, and Umkabu villages.
- Samate District: Jefman village.
- Teluk Manyalibit District: Mumes village.

Kafdaron dialect

- Samate District: Yensawai, Amdui, Yenanas, and Aresi villages

Karon dialect

- Sausapor District: Sausapor village
- Bikar (Biak Karon) District, Tambrauw Regency

Usba dialect

- Waigeo Utara District: Rauki village.
- Ayau District: Dorekar and Meosbekwan villages.

Wardo dialect

- Waigeo Timur District: Yensner, Urbinasopen, Yembekaki, and Puper villages.
- Waigeo Utara District: Menir, Warwanai, Boni, Asukweri, and Kabare villages.
- Ayau District: Rutung, Reni, and Yenkawir villages.

== Sociolinguistic situation ==
Despite the comparatively high number of speakers compared to some other Austronesian languages, Biak is still in danger of extinction. Within the main towns, the generation of speakers aged between 20 and 50 have only passive knowledge of the language and rarely use the language actively, instead preferring to use Malay. Younger generations do not even generally have passive knowledge of the language. Biak is only actively used as a spoken language by members of the community over 50 years of age or so and even they regularly code switch into Malay. However, within the villages further from town there are still children who are fluent in Biak. Songs in Biak are also very popular throughout the islands.

There is a strong initiative to promote the use of the Biak language, with translations of various books and teaching manuals as well as a radio station and a number of church services throughout the year being conducted solely in Biak. Since 2002, there has also been an initiative to introduce Biak being taught formerly in schools on the islands.

== Phonology ==
Biak has a phoneme inventory consisting of 13 consonants and 5 vowels, in which vowel length is phonemic. In the orthography long vowels are written with an acute accent. The phoneme /t/ is very infrequent in its use and some older speakers still realise it as [s] in loanwords.

Consonants
	Bilabial	Labiodental	Alveolar	Palatal	Velar
Nasal	m		n		
Plosive	p b		t d		k
Fricative	β	f	s		
Lateral			l		
Trill			r		
Semivowel	w			j	

Vowels
	Front	Central	Back
Close	i iː		u uː
Mid	e eː		ɤ ɤː
Open		a aː	

The vowel /u/ is the only rounded vowel in Biak; the other four are unrounded.

== Morphology ==
=== Pronouns and person markers ===
In Biak pronouns and articles are morphologically related, with both situating a given participant by indicating their relative discourse or spatial (e.g. directional or motional) status. This is not uncommon for Austronesian Languages. Pronouns in Biak are marked for number and clusivity.

Free Pronouns
		Singular	Dual	Paucal	Plural
1st person	exclusive	aya	nu		inko
1st person	inclusive	aya	ku		ko
2nd person		aw	mu		mko
3rd person		i	su	sko	si (alienable) na (inalienable)

Free personal pronouns in Biak share their main distributional properties with nouns; however, they are somewhat more restricted. They can be used as a complement of a predicate or preposition but they cannot be used as subjects. In the example below, the use of the first-person personal pronoun aya can be seen to complement a verb, while the second example shows how a free personal pronoun, in this clause third-person i, cannot be used as a subject:

Badir i ve aya
2SG.announce 3SG to 1SG
'Make it known to me.'

{* i} d-ores
3SG 3SG-stand
'He stood.'

=== Pronominal affixes ===
In Biak, pronominal affixes can combine with verbs in three possible inflection patterns (given in the table below), which are partly phonologically conditioned.

	Set 1	Set 2	Set 3
1SG	ya-	y-	ya-
2SG	wa-	w-	⟨w⟩
3SG	i-	d-	⟨y⟩
1DU.I	ku-	ku-	ku-
1DU.E	nu-	nu-	nu-
2DU	mu-	mu-	mu-
3DU	su-	su-	su-
3PC	sko-	sk-	sko-
1PL.I	ko-	k-	ko-
1PL.E	(i)nko-	(i)nk-	(i)nko-
2PL	mko-	mk-	mko-
3PL.AN	si-	s-	s-
3PL.INAN	na-	n-	n-

The presence of a subject noun phrase in the same clause is optional. Thus the following sentence is still grammatical without NP Rusa nanine, while the verb has a pronominal affix that gives the same information.

(Rusa nan-i-ne) d-ores
deer GIV-3SG.SPC-this 3SG-stand
'This deer stood.'

These pronominal markers are person markers and are found in the final position of the noun phrase they determine. They attach to verbs along with a specifier that attaches after the pronominal affix; due to their distribution properties these markers should be considered clitics. There are two specificity markers, -ya and –i, where –ya can be used in all positions and -i is restricted to positions before pauses. In the example below the article attaches to the verb vebaya, rather than the verb ifrúr because it is the final verb in the noun phrase headed by for.

i-frúr for ve-ba=ya
3SG-make fire REL.big=3SG.SPC
'He made a big fire.'

Nonspecificity, which refers to entities that do not yet exist in this world, or is used to question or deny the existence of an entity, is marked with the articles –o for singular and –no for plural noun phrases. This is shown in the examples below:

Non-specific

I-fúr yuk=o fa y-ún i ve Waranda.
3SG-make ukulele=NSPC.SG CONS 1SG-take 3SG to The.Netherlands
'He is making/will make a ukulele so that I can take it to the Netherlands'

Specific

I-fúr yuk=ya fa y-ún i ve Waranda.
3SG-make ukulele=3SG.SPC CONS 1SG-take 3SG to The.Netherlands
'He has made a ukulele so that I can take it to the Netherlands'

=== Demonstratives ===
Biak has identical forms in adnominal and pronominal demonstratives, which is common in Austronesian languages. In Biak, demonstratives can be used as part of complex articles containing demonstrative roots and also motion markers and directionals. Complex articles, however, do not have both a directional and a motion marker.

3SG complex articles
		giv	person- SPC	dir	motion marker	dm	meaning
bare demonstrative article	close S:ne		i		(ma/fa/ra)	ne	'this'
bare demonstrative article	close A:ya~yi		i		(ma/fa/ra)	ya ~yi	'that'
bare demonstrative article	not S/A:wa~wu		i		(ma/fa/ra)	wa ~wu	'that over there'
demonstrative article, given	close S:ne	an	i		(ma/fa/ra)	ne	'this'
demonstrative article, given	close A:ya~yi	an	i		(ma/fa/ra)	ya	'that'
demonstrative article, given	not S/A:wa~wu	an	i		(ma/fa/ra)	wa	'that over there'
(given) demonstrative- directional article	close S:ne	(an)	i	pur	?	ne	'this at the back'
(given) demonstrative- directional article	close A:ya~yi	(an)	i	pur	?	ya	'that at the back'
(given) demonstrative- directional article	not S/A:wa~wu	(an)	i	pur	?	wa	'that at the back over there'

The table above restricts person-SPC to 3SG marker for an explanation, but i- 3SG marker can be replaced sui- (DU), skoi- (TR), and si- (PL.AN) or na- (PL.INAN). Also, the corpus contains no example of complex articles containing both a directional and a motion marker. Furthermore, yi and wu are used as allomorphs of ya and wa, respectively, but attested in article-final position only.

In Biak, the relationship between the third-person pronouns and demonstratives are unrelated to demonstratives, which is uncommon in Austronesian languages. However, Biak follows the worldwide trend in terms of the relationship.

Moreover, depending on the speaker's relative distance, Biak has three-way distance contrasts of adnominal demonstratives, which is common in Austronesian languages. The comparison is restricted to only adnominal use because some languages do not express the same distance contrasts in adnominal and pronominal demonstratives.

If a complex article contains a demonstrative, the demonstrative is preceded by person-SPC, as illustrated by i-ne '3SG.SPC-this' and i-wa '3SG.SPC-over.there', respectively. Also, in the below examples, situational use of demonstratives is shown.

Rwa ma wákors ra var ine.
r<w>a ma w-ák-ors ra var i-ne
<2SG>go to.here 2SG-also-stand along side 3SG.SPC-this
'Come here and stand at this side too.'

Mov iwa snori Mnubei (...)
mov i-wa sno-ri Mnubei (...)
place 3SG.SPC-over.there name-POS.SG Mnubei {}
'The place over there its name is Mnubei (...)'

The paradigm for complex articles sets the basis for deictic nouns, predicative pronouns, and locative-existentials.

==== Deictic nouns ====
Deictic nouns are formed by applying the formative di 'place' at the position preceding demonstratives, as illustrated by di-pur-wu 'place-back-over.there' and di-ne 'place-here.'

Skovark ro dipurwu.
sko-vark ro di-pur-wu
3.PAU-lie LOC place-back-over.there
'They live over there.'

Mankroder ine dúnuk ro dine.
mankroder i-ne d-ún-uk ro di-ne
frog 3SG.SPC-this 3SG-take-in.two LOC place-here
'This frog has passed through here.'

The situational use of demonstratives is seen in (9). On the other hand, (10) shows -ne 'this' as the situational use of demonstratives and -ne 'here' as the anaphoric use of demonstratives.

==== Predicative pronouns ====
Predicative pronouns are formed by using the inflected predicative is 'PRED' at the position otherwise occupied by the marker of givenness an. This is illustrated by is-i-ne '3SG.PRED-SPC-this' in both (11) and (12).

Isine indya mámel.
is-i-ne indya mám
3SG.PRED-SPC-this so 2SG.see
'Here it (the sago porridge) is, so look!'

Betaweya isine.
betawe=ya is-i-ne
cassava=3SG.SPC 3SG.PRED-SPC-here
'This here is a cassava.'

In (11), it depends on the context whether situational or anaphoric use of the demonstrative is. Situational use of the demonstrative is given in (12).

==== Locative-existentials ====
Locative-existentials is different from predicative pronouns because they do not possess a specificity marker, which is illustrated by i-is-wa '3SG.PRED-over.there'.

Karuiya i-is-wa kaker.
karui=ya is-wa kaker
stone=3SG.SPC 3SG.PRED-over.there still
'The stone is still there.'

In (13), the use of the demonstrative depends on the context.

== Semantics ==
=== Demonstratives ===
Use of demonstratives, where Viewpoint (V)= speaker(S), R= Relatum, A=addressee
form	gloss	used to refer to entities conceived as:	Levinson's terminology
ne	this	close to S, but not closer to A than to S	close to V (usually S) =R
ya~yi	that	relatively close to S (and A), but not closer to S than to A	Relatively close to V (usually S) =R1, not closer to V than to R2 (usually A).
wa~wu	that over there	away from shared area of both S and A	Away from R1 (usually S) and R2 (usually A)

For the semantic characterization of demonstratives, a part of Levinson's terminology should be known to grasp the difference between the Figure and the Ground or the Relatum. The Figure refers to an entity positioned somewhere in Space, while the Ground or the Relatum designate the entity in terms of where the entity is.

As additional information, there are three essential points about Levinson's terminology. First, the 'frame of reference' can be classified as an intrinsic frame of reference, a relative frame of reference, and an absolute frame of reference. Second, it is crucial to grasp the origo of the coordinate system. The deictic centre called origo is approximately equal to the speaker's position. Third, it is vital to comprehend deixis. For spatial deixis, the interpretation of spatial linguistics elements is defined by the location of extra-linguistic entities.

Regarding the demonstratives usage, it may be followed by pointing, such as lip-pointing, head pointing, or finger pointing.

== Syntax ==
=== Demonstratives ===
From a perspective of syntax, Deictic nouns typically set the complement of a preposition. This is clear from the form di-ne 'place-here,' di-wa 'place-over.there' in (14) and (15), respectively. However, the demonstrative locational nouns are used on their own, without a preceding preposition. This is illustrated by di-ne 'place-here' in (16).

Ivyovr ve dine myáse.
i-vyovr ve di-ne m-yás
3SG-sweep to place-here to.here-up
'It (the big wave) swept towards this place here upwards.'

Ikun si ro diwa.
i-kun si ro di-wa
3SG-burn 3PL.ANIM LOC place-over.there
'He burnt them (his skin) over there.'

Dine, randakya karui veba.
di-ne randak=ya karui ve-ba
place-here beginning=3SG.SPC stone REL-big
'Here, in the beginning there were big stones.'

In (14), (15), and (16), these contain the situational use of demonstratives.

== Possession ==
Similar to other Austronesian languages, Biak makes a grammatical distinction between alienable and inalienable for possession.

=== Alienable possession ===
In alienable possession, a possessive pronominal is formed with the possessive marker ve to signify the person, number and gender of the possessor, and is followed by a pronominal article marking the gender and number of the possessed. The pronominal article contains the specificity markers -i and -ya, with -i being used only in pre-pausal positions. The following table illustrates the possessive pronominal construction.

Possessed-> Possessor:	SG	DU	TR	PL.AN	PL.INAN
1SG	(a)ye=d-i/=d-ya	(a)ye=su-ya/-i	(a)ye=sko-ya/-i	(a)ye=s-ya/-i	(a)ye=na
2SG	be=d-i/=d-ya	be-=su-ya/-i	be=sko-ya/-i	be=s-ya/-i	be=na
3SG	v<y>e=d-i/=d-ya	v<y>e=su-ya/-i	v<y>e =sko-ya/-i	v<y>e =s-ya/-i	v<y>e =na
1DU.INCL	Ku-ve=d-i/=d-ya	ku-ve=su-ya/-i	ku-ve=sko-ya/-i	ku-ve=s-ya/-i	ku-ve=na
1DU.EXC	nu-ve=d-i/=d-ya	nu-ve=su-ya/-i	nu-ve=sko-ya/-i	nu-ve=s-ya/-i	nu-ve=na
2DU	mu-ve=d-i/=d-ya	mu-ve=su-ya/-i	mu-ve=sko-ya/-i	mu-ve=s-ya/-i	mu-ve=na
3DU	su-ve=d-i/=d-ya	su-ve=su-ya/-i	su-ve=sko-ya/-i	su-ve=s-ya/-i	su-ve=na
3PC	sko-ve=d-i/=d-ya	sko-ve=su-ya/-i	sko-ve=sko-ya/-i	sko-ve=s-ya/-i	sko-ve=na
1PL.INCL	ko-ve=d-i/=d-ya	ko-ve=su-ya/-i	ko-ve=sko-ya/-i	ko-ve=s-ya/-i	i ko-ve=na
1PL.EXC	(i)nko-ve=d-i/=d-ya	(i)nko-ve=su-ya/-i	(i)nko-ve=sko-ya/-i	(i)nko-ve=s-ya/-i	(i)nko-ve=na
2PL	mko-ve=d-i/=d-ya	mko-ve=su-ya/-i	mko-ve=sko-ya/-i	mko-ve=s-ya/-i	mko-ve=na
3PL.AN	se=d-i/=d-ya	se=su-ya/-i	se=sko-ya/-i	se=s-ya/-i	se=na
3PL.INAN	nbe=d-i/d-ya	nbe=su-ya/-i	nbe=sko-ya/-i	nbe=s-ya/-i	nbe=na

Typically, Biak follows a possessor-possessum structure for alienable possessive construction, with the possessive pronominal in the adnominal position:

ikak an-i-ne snonsnon v<y>e=d-ya Kormsamba
snake GIV-3SG.SPC-this name <3SG>POSS=3SG-SPC Kormsamba
'The Snake’s name was Kormsamba'

However, alienable possession can also be formed in the order of possessum-possessor, though this is much less frequent:

romawa inai manseren v<y>e=s-ya
son daughter Lord <3SG>POSS=3PL.AN-SPC
'The Lord's sons and daughters'

=== Inalienable possession ===
Inalienable possessive construction differs from alienable in that there is no system of pronominal possessives, only a set of affixes located on the possessum. In contrast to alienable possession, inalienable possession can only take the order of possessor-possessum. Biak contains three subsets of inalienability: body parts, Kinship, and locational.

==== Body parts ====
Not all body parts are considered inalienable. Those that are form the stem words from which to derive other body parts through the method of compounding. For example, the alienable 'knee' is formed through the inalienable stem we ('leg') and the compounding pur ('back') to form wepur. Possessive construction for alienable body parts follows the same pattern as other alienable terms. The inflectional system for inalienable body parts is as follows:

Vru 'head'
	SG	DU	TR	PL
1SG	Vru-ri	-	-	-
2SG	Vru-m-ri	-	-	-
3SG	Vru-ri	-	-	-
1DU.INCL	-	ku-vru-s-na		
1DU.EXC	-	nu-vru-s-na		
2DU	-	mu-vru-m-s-na		
3DU	-	su-vru-s-na		
3TR	-	sko-vru-s-na		
1PL.INCL	-	ko-vru-s-na		
1PL.EXC	-	nko-vru-s-na		
2PL	-	mko-vru-m-s-na		
3PL.AN	-	si-vru-s-na		

Unusual for Austronesian languages of the area, Biak contains a partial prefix system for inflecting inalienable body parts. For the plural forms, suffix -s reflects plurality and animateness of possessor and suffix na expresses plurality and inaninameteness of the possessum. As stated above, inalienable possession is formed via a possessor-possessum structure:

sne-ri i-ba
belly-POSS.SG 3SG-big
'She was pregnant (her belly was big)'

==== Kinship terms ====
Similarly to body parts, not all kinship terms are inalienable. The alienable kinship terms are formed through the same compounding method as alienable body parts, and follow the same possessive construction rules as other alienable terms. This table illustrates the inflectional system for inalienable kinship words:

Me 'cross-uncle'
	SG	DU	TR	PL
1SG	imem(=i)	imem(=su)	imem(=sko)	-
2SG	me-m(=i)	me-m(=su)	me-m(=sko)	-
3SG	me-r(=i)	me-r(=su)	me-r(=sko)	-
1DU	-	-	-	-
2DU	-	-	-	-
3DU	-	-	-	-
3TR	-	-	-	-
1PL	-	-	-	-
2PL	-	-	-	-
3PL	-	-	-	-

All nouns that follow the table's procedure have an idiosyncratic form for the first person, using a shorter term for the second and third person. (REF pg. 244) Here is an example of the usage of inalienable kinship inflection:

s<y>éwar kma-r=i
<3SG>seek father-POSS.3SG=3SG
'He looked for his father'

==== Locational nouns ====
Locational nouns are the last distinction of inalienability found in Biak. Locational nouns refer to locations that are ‘inherently connected to an entity’. For example, a tree in Biak is referred to as having an 'upper part' and a 'lower part', and a canoe a 'front', a 'middle' and a 'back'. The following table exhibits the inflectional system for inalienable locational nouns:

bo ‘upper part/ area above’
	SG	DU	TR	PL.ANIM	Pl.INAN
1	-	-	-	-	-
2	bo-m-ri	-	-	-	-
3	bo-ri	bo-n-su	bo-n-sko	bo-n-si	bo-n-na

The suffix -n expresses the plurality and inanimateness of the possessum (REF pg. 250). The locational noun possessive structure is illustrated in this example:

bal i-ne v<y>ark ro karui=su-ya bonsu
ball 3SG.SPC-this <3SG>lie LOC stone=3DU-SPC upside-NSG.INAN-3DU
'This ball lies on top of two stones'

== Negation ==
Biak distinguishes between factual and imperative negation (prohibitive). The marker for factual negation is va. For prohibitive it is awer.

=== Factual negation: va ===
The negator va occurs clause-finally in intransitive and transitive clauses.

Intransitive

Isyor va.
i-syor va
3SG-low.tide NEG
'It's not low tide'

Transitive

Dan (i)mbyefya va.
d-an (i)mbyef=ya va
3SG-eat banana=3SG.SPC NEG
'S/he does not eat the banana.'

Yafár kám i va.
ya-fár kam i va
1SG-tell all 3SG NEG
'I have not told all of it.'

Roma vyanine dóve bapak isne va, yakramu seno va.
romawa v<y>=an-i-ne d-óve bapak is-ne va ya-kram=u sen=o va
son <3SG>POS=GIV-3SG.SPC-this 3SG-say father 3SG.PRED-this NEG 1SG-store=U cent=NSPC.SG NEG
'His son said "father isn't here, I do not have a penny." '

In clauses with non-core arguments, va follows directly the argument it negates.

Denf ro dine va.
d-enf ro di-ne va
3SG-sleep LOC place-this NEG
'He does not sleep here' (but somewhere else).

Denf va ro dine.
d-enf va ro di-ne
3SG-sleep NEG LOC place-this
'He does not sleep here' (but does something else here).

Va is also used to negate nominal clauses.

Guruno va.
guru=no va
teacher=NSPC.NSG NEG
'There are no teachers.'

==== Factual negation in complex clauses ====
In complex clauses with fa, a conjunction expressing result, it seems that the negator va always occurs last in the sentence. In the corpus of spontaneous speech collected by van den Heuvel, there are no examples with va appearing at the end of the first clause.

Mansren Yesus ipok fa vyefarander ko va.
Manseren Yesus i-pok fa v<y>e-farander ko va
Lord Jesus 3SG-able CONS <3SG>VBZ-forget 1PL.INCL NEG
'The Lord Jesus cannot forget us.'

In other complex clauses the negator may follow the first or final clause.

Dár ve randip va voi, dár ve snonkaku.
d-ár ve randip va voi d-ár ve snonkaku
3SG-cry as pig NEG but 3SG-cry as human.being
'It did not cry as a pig but as a human being.'

Sansun vyena naisya voi, dáknayu sarako va.
sansun v<y>e=na na-is-ya voi d-ák-na-yu sarak=o va
clothes <3SG>POS=3PL.INAN.SPC 3PL.INAN-PRED-that but 3SG-also-have-YU bracelet=NSPC.SG NEG
'His clothes were there, but he did not (also) have a bracelet.'

Vyeurus pyum bakn vyedine va {rao isofro} dármaker.
v<y>e-urus pyum bakn v<y>e=d-i-ne va {rao isofro} d-ármakr
<3SG>VBZ-arrange good body <3SG>VBZ=3SG-SPC-this NEG until 3SG-scabies
'He did not take care of his body very well, until he got scabies.'

==== With bukan ====
Bukan is a loan from Malay/Indonesian. In Indonesian, the use of bukan, outside its function of negating noun phrases, expresses emphasis. The use of bukan in Biak also appears to express emphasis – in the examples given by van den Heuvel, it use occurs when a contrast is given. Bukan is used in combination with va. Bukan precedes the first verb and va is in its usual place at the end of the clause.

Indya bukan kokain kofafyár biasa va.
indya bukan ko-kain ko-fafyár biasa va
so NEG 1PL.INCL-sit 1PL.INCL-tell usual NEG
'So we are not (just) sitting and telling here (but have a serious meeting)'

Pendeta dóve "a, bukan yakofn ve ko vape yakofn ve warga jemaatsi.
pendeta d-óve a bukan ya-kofn ve ko vape ya-kofn ve warga jemaat=s-i
minister 3SG-say a NEG 1SG-speak to 1PL.INCL but 1SG-speak to member church=3PL.ANIM-SPC
'The minister said "Ah, I did not say that to us, but to the members of the church!"'

=== Imperative negation: awer ===
The prohibitive marker awer is used to negate arguments in 1st, 2nd and 3rd person.

1st person

Voi komyof setengah awer i voi komyof kaku i kám fa…
voi ko-myof setengah awer i voi ko-myof kaku i kám fa
but 1PL.INCL-defend half PROH 3SG but 1PL.INCL-defend true 3SG all CONS
'And let us not defend half of it, but let's really defend all of it, so that …'

2nd person

Wenf awer!
w-enf awer
2SG-sleep NEG
'Do not sleep!'

3rd person

Ipok vyunk awer mnor vyena.
i-pok v<y>unk awer mnor v<y>e=na
3SG-can <3SG>wipe.off not mucus <3SG>POS=3PL.INAN.SPC
'He is not allowed to wipe off his mucus.'

=== Other negators ===
To express 'not yet', Biak uses the marker vanim/vaim. For 'not any more' wer va is used.

Ono sibur ve movo movo vaím kám vo (…)
ono si-bur ve mov=o mov=o vaím kám vo {}
INDEF.PL 3PL.ANIM-leave to place=NSPC.SG place=NSPC.SG not.yet all SIM {}
'There were not yet any people at all who had left to other places and (….)'

Sikafkif fa sséwar sarak ini. Ma sisrow i vanim.
si-kaf~kif fa s-séwar sarak i-ne ma si-srow i vanim
3PL.AN-REDUP~pick CONS 3PL.AN-seek bracelet 3SG.SPC-this and 3PL.AN-find 3SG not.yet
'They (the chickens) pick to find this bracelet. And they have not found it yet.'

Bukuno vaíme.
buku=no vaím-e
book=NSPC.NSG not.yet
'There are no books yet'.

Isyor wer va.
I-syor wer va
3SG-low.tide again not
'It is not low tide any more.'

=== Typological perspectives ===
In Austronesian languages, the negator commonly precedes the predicate. Thus Biak, with clause final negation, is atypical in this feature. Clause final negation, however, is a common feature in the region of the Eastern Bird's Head Peninsula, in both Austronesian and Papuan languages. It appears to be of Papuan origin.

== Numerals ==
Biak numerals
	Biak
1	eser/oser
2	suru
3	kyor
4	fyak
5	rim
6	wonem
7	fik
8	war
9	siw
10	samfur
11	samfur sesr oser
20	samfur di suru
100	utin
1000	syáran

== Glossary ==
ANIM	animate
CONS	consecutive
GIV	given
INAN	inanimate
INCL	inclusive
INDEF	indefinite
LOC	locative
NEG	negator
NSG	non-singular
NSP	nonspecific
PL	plural
POS	possessive marker
PRED	predicate
REL	relativiser
SG	singular
SIM	simultaneous
SPC	specific
U	‘filler’
VBZ	verbaliser
