= Dawera-Daweloor language =

Austronesian language spoken in Maluku, Indonesia

Dawera-Daweloor
- Native to: Indonesia
- Region: Maluku
- Native speakers: 1,300 (2007)
- Language family: Austronesian: Malayo-Polynesian (MP); Central–Eastern MP; Babar; North Babar; Dawera-Daweloor

Language codes
- ISO 639-3: ddw
- Glottolog: dawe1237

Dawera-Daweloor is an Austronesian language spoken in six villages on Dawera and Daweloor islands in South Maluku, Indonesia.

== Phonology ==
=== Consonants ===
Dawera-Daweloor has the following consonants.

		Bilabial	Coronal	Palatal	Velar	Glottal
Nasal		m	n			
Plosive	voiceless	p	t		k	
Plosive	voiced		d			
Fricative			s			h
Lateral			l			
Rhotic			r			
Semivowel		w		j		

=== Vowels ===
Dawera-Daweloor has the following vowels.

	front	back unrounded	back rounded
High	i		u
Non-High	e	a	o
