= Mor language (Austronesian) =

Austronesian language spoken in Indonesia

Mor
- Moor
- mòra ríana
- Native to: Indonesia
- Region: Moor Island, Nabire Regency, Central Papua
- Native speakers: (700 cited 1987)
- Language family: Austronesian: Malayo-Polynesian; Central–Eastern Malayo-Polynesian; Eastern Malayo-Polynesian; South Halmahera–West New Guinea; Mor

Language codes
- ISO 639-3: mhz
- Glottolog: morm1235
- ELP: Mor (Mor Islands, Indonesia)

Mor or Moor is a tonal Austronesian language. It is a primary branch of the South Halmahera–West New Guinea languages.

Its dialects are Ayombai, Hirom, and Kama.
