= Theretra wetanensis =

Scientific classification
- Kingdom: Animalia
- Phylum: Arthropoda
- Class: Insecta
- Order: Lepidoptera
- Family: Sphingidae
- Genus: Theretra
- Species: T. wetanensis

Binomial name
- Theretra wetanensis Eitschberger, 2010

Species of moth

Theretra wetanensis is a moth of the family Sphingidae. It is found on Wetan Island, part of the Moluccas in Indonesia.
