= Ansus people =

Ethnic group in Indonesia

Serui Ansus
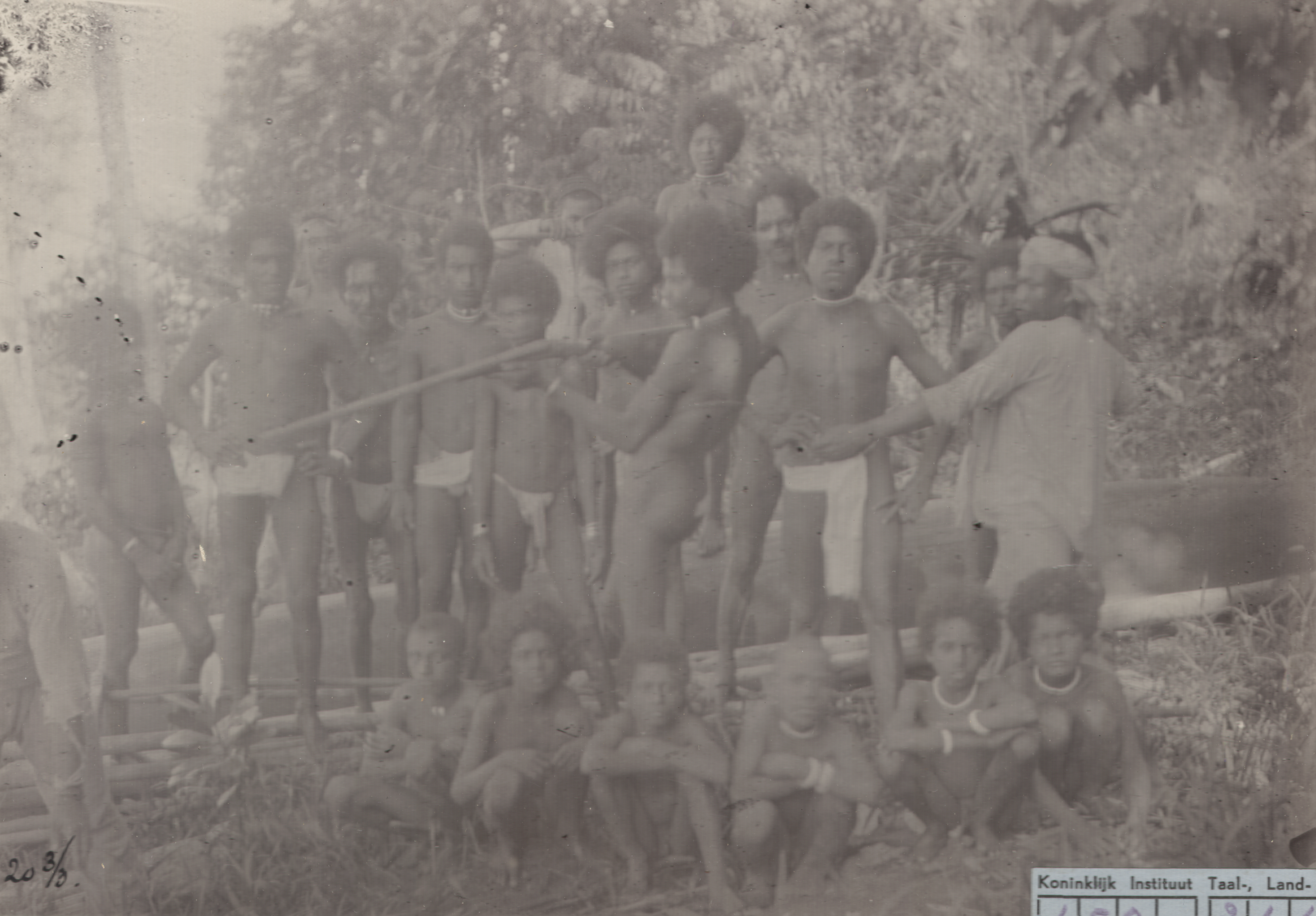

Total population
- 7,700

Regions with significant populations
- Indonesia (Yapen Islands Regency)

Languages
- Ansus, Indonesian

Religion
- Protestant Christianity

The Ansus people (Ansus: Serui Ansus) are a subgroup of the Serui people originating from the Yapen Islands in Papua. They are one of the many ethnic groups of West Papua who predominantly inhabit coastal settlements, especially in the region of West Yapen, including Ansus Village and surrounding areas.
