= Lower Mamberamo languages =

Proposed language family of New Guinea

Lower Mamberamo
- Geographic distribution: mouth of the Mamberamo River, New Guinea
- Linguistic classification: Austronesian, or a primary language family ("Papuan")
- Proto-language: Proto-Lower Mamberamo
- Subdivisions: Warembori; Yoke

Language codes
- Glottolog: lowe1409

The Lower Mamberamo languages are a recently proposed language family linking two languages spoken along the northern coast of Papua province, Indonesia, near the mouth of the Mamberamo River. They have various been classified either as heavily Papuanized Austronesian languages belonging to the SHWNG branch, or as Papuan languages that had undergone heavy Austronesian influence. Glottolog 3.4 classifies Lower Mamberamo as Austronesian, while Donohue classifies it as Papuan. Kamholz (2014) classifies Warembori and Yoke each as coordinate primary subgroups of the South Halmahera–West New Guinea languages.

== Languages ==
The two languages, Warembori and Yoke, were listed as isolates in Stephen Wurm's widely used classification. Donohue (1998) showed them to be related with shared morphological irregularities. Ross (2007) classified Warembori as an Austronesian language based on pronouns; however, Donohue argues that these are borrowed, since the two pronouns most resistant to borrowing, 'I' and 'thou', do not resemble Austronesian or any other language family. The singular prefixes resemble Kwerba languages, but Lower Mamberamo has nothing else in common with that family. (See Warembori language and Yoke language for details.) Donohue argues that they form an independent family, though one perhaps related to another Papuan family, that has been extensively relexified under Austronesian influence, especially in the case of Warembori.

Pauwi, now extinct, may have been a Lower Mamberamo language.

== Pronouns ==
Reconstructed independent pronouns in proto-Lower Mamberamo are:

	sg	pl
1	*e	*ki
2	*a	*mi
3	*(y)i	*si

Foley observes that there are likely similarities with Austronesian languages, likely due to contact.

*e 'I' and *a 'you (sg)' are also shared with neighboring Kwerba languages.

== Cognates ==
Basic vocabulary, mostly cognates, of the Lower Mamberamo languages (Warembori and Yoke) listed in Foley (2018):

Lower Mamberamo family basic vocabulary
gloss	Warembori	Yoke	notes
'bird'	mani	mani	< Austronesian
'bone'	kombo	akombu	
'eat'	an	aang	< Austronesian ?
'egg'	ndowa	nduvu	
'give'	ore	o	
'go'	da	da	< Austronesian ?
'hair'	bun	bo	< Austronesian
'hear'	nata	nanta	
'kill'	muni	mu	< Austronesian
'leg'	epi	pi	
'louse'	ki	ninggi	< Austronesian ?
'man'	man	mamb	
'name'	nan	nand	
'tree'	ayo	a	< Austronesian

== Vocabulary comparison ==
The following basic vocabulary words are from Voorhoeve (1975), as cited in the Trans-New Guinea database:

gloss	Warembori	Yoke
head	irimundo	
hair	iburando	kiraumga
eye	ibaro	kikia
tooth	iburoro	kebrua
leg	kemaro	kipitaopa
louse	kiro	niŋi
dog		nieiba
pig	puwe	pero
bird	maniro	
egg	manindobaro	
blood	daro	
bone	kekomboro	
skin	akuero	
tree	awuro	aba
man	mando	maomba
sun	ururo	tebia; wit
water	dando	diri; memba
fire	ontemaro	oba
stone	bakandaro	antusua
name	inanora	
eat	ando	ani
one	iseno	osxenu
two	kainduo	kaiamba

== See also ==
- South Halmahera–West New Guinea languages
- Papuan languages
