= Wetan Island =

Island in Indonesia

Coordinates: 7°53′50″S 129°32′27″E

Wetan Island (or Wetang Island) is an island, part of the Babar Islands, in the Moluccas, Indonesia. Its people speak the Wetan language. A species of moth (Theretra wetanensis) was discovered on the island and named for it.
