= Waropen language =

Austronesian language

Waropen
- Wonti
- Native to: Indonesia
- Region: West Papua, Central Papua, and Papua
- Native speakers: (6,000 cited 1987)
- Language family: Austronesian: Malayo-Polynesian; Central–Eastern Malayo-Polynesian; Eastern Malayo-Polynesian; South Halmahera–West New Guinea; Waropen
- Dialects: Ambumi; Mo'or (Moor); Napan; Waropen Kai

Language codes
- ISO 639-3: wrp
- Glottolog: waro1242
- Distribution of the Waropen language on the north coast of Papua, Indonesia.

Waropen (Wonti) is an Austronesian language spoken at the Cendrawasih Bay of Papua, Indonesia. It is a primary branch of the South Halmahera–West New Guinea languages.

Dialects are Ambumi, Napan, Mo'or (Moor), and Waropen Kai.

== Phonology ==
Consonants
		Labial	Alveolar	Palatal	Velar	Glottal
Nasal		m	n		ŋ	
Plosive	voiceless	p	t		k	ʔ
Plosive	prenasal	ᵐb	ⁿd		ᵑɡ	
Plosive	voiced	b	d		ɡ	
Fricative		f	s		ɣ	(h)
Rhotic			r			
Approximant		w		j		

/w/ can also be heard as a fricative [β].

/h/ may also exist phonemically in other dialects.

Sounds /w, j/ can be heard as vowels [ʊ, ɪ] when after vowel sounds.

Vowels
	Front	Central	Back
Close	i		u
Mid	ɛ ~ e	ə	ɔ
Open		a	

/ɛ/ may be pronounced as [ɛ] or [e].

== Distribution ==
In Papua province, it is spoken in Mamberamo Raya Regency and Waropen Regency. The Ambumi dialect, also called Waruri, mainly spoken in Ambumi village in Wondama Bay Regency, West Papua. Waropen is also spoken southwest to the Rombak River mouth.

Among the Ambumi dialect, there are two groups of speech areas, namely in Nabire Regency, including the villages of Napan (considered a separate dialect), Weinami, Masipawe, Makimi, Moor (separate dialect), Mambor, and Ambumi. In addition, there is a speech group that enters the Manokwari Regency, inhabits the villages of Yendeman, Saybes, War, Kayob, and Menarbu. Meanwhile, Waropen Kai dialect speakers inhabit the villages of Semanui, Wapoga, Desawa, Waren, and the villages of Paradoi, Sanggei, Mambui, and Nubuai, which are combined in several settlement, namely Urei Faisei, Risei Sayati, Wonti, Bokaro, and Koweda.
