= Masela language =

Austronesian language of Maluku, Indonesia

Masela
- Marsela
- Native to: Indonesia
- Region: Maluku
- Native speakers: (1,900 cited 1980–2007)
- Language family: Austronesian: Malayo-Polynesian (MP); Central–Eastern MP; Babar; South Babar; Masela–Southeast; Masela

Language codes
- ISO 639-3: Variously: mxz – Central Masela vme – East Masela mss – West Masela
- Glottolog: cent2072 Central east2462 East west2535 West

Masela (Marsela) is the language of Marsela Island in southern Maluku, Indonesia. Regional varieties are distinct; Ethnologue counts it as three languages.
