= Meoswar language =

Language in Papua

Meoswar
- War
- Native to: West Papua, Indonesia
- Region: Meoswar Island, Cenderawasih Bay
- Native speakers: (250 cited 1993)
- Language family: Austronesian: Malayo-Polynesian; Central–Eastern Malayo-Polynesian; Eastern Malayo-Polynesian; South Halmahera–West New Guinea; Cenderawasih Bay; Biakic; Meoswar

Language codes
- ISO 639-3: mvx
- Glottolog: meos1237
- ELP: Meoswar
- Location within Western New Guinea Location within Indonesia
- Coordinates: 2.08°S 134.38°E

Meoswar is an Austronesian language of Cenderawasih Bay in the province of West Papua, Indonesia.
