= Yeretuar language =

Austronesian language spoken in Indonesia

Yeretuar
- Umar, Goni
- kra umari
- Native to: Indonesia
- Region: West Papua
- Native speakers: (350 cited 2000)
- Language family: Austronesian: Malayo-Polynesian; Central–Eastern Malayo-Polynesian; Eastern Malayo-Polynesian; South Halmahera–West New Guinea; Cenderawasih Bay; Southwestern; Yeretuar

Language codes
- ISO 639-3: gop
- Glottolog: yere1243
- Coordinates: 3.02°S 134.66°E

Yeretuar, also called Umar or Goni, is an Eastern Malayo-Polynesian language in its putative Cenderawasih languages branch, originating from Cenderawasih Bay (Geelvink Bay) in West Papua Province of Western New Guinea, northeastern Indonesia.
