= Yoke language =

Language of Papua, Indonesia, of uncertain affiliation

Yoke
- Pauwi
- Native to: Indonesia
- Region: Yoke village, Mamberamo Hilir District, Mamberamo Raya Regency, Papua
- Native speakers: (200 cited 1998)
- Language family: Lower Mamberamo: Yoke

Language codes
- ISO 639-3: yki
- Glottolog: yoke1239
- ELP: Yoke

Yoke is a poorly documented language spoken by about 200 people in the north of Papua, Indonesia. The name is also spelled Yoki, Yauke, and it is also known as Bitovondo. It was spoken in a single village in the interior until the government relocated a third of the population to a new village, Mantarbori, on the coast. In the late 19th century, a word list of "Pauwi" was collected by Robidé van der Aa at Lake Rombebai, where the Yoke say they migrated from; this is transparently Yoke, apart from some words which do not appear in the modern language but are found in related Warembori.

== Classification ==
About one third of the vocabulary of Yoke is cognate with Warembori, a language which has either been strongly influenced by Austronesian languages, or is an Austronesian language strongly influenced by Papuan languages. The two languages are grammatically very similar, with shared morphological irregularities, demonstrating a genealogical relationship. However, Yoke does not share the Austronesian features of Warembori, and it is unclear how this relates to Ross's 2005 classification, based on pronouns, of Warembori as an Austronesian language.

== Grammar ==
On the surface, at least, Yoke has the following sounds:

Consonants
		Labial	Coronal	Dorsal
Nasal		m	n	ɲ
Plosive	voiceless	p	t	k
Plosive	voiced	b	d	ɡ
Fricative		β	s	ɣ
Approximant		w	ɾ	j

Vowels
	Front	Central	Back
Close	i		u
Mid	e		o
Open		a	

Unusually for a Papuan language, but like Warembori, Yoke has prepositions and a subject–verb–object (SVO) constituent order. Verbs have subject prefixes and may have one or more object suffixes. The verbal affixes are:

	Subject	Object
1sg	e-	-e
2sg	a-	-a
3sg	i-, ja-, ∅-	-i
1pl	ki-	-oɣo
2pl	mi-, im-	-amo
3pl	si-	-esi

The independent pronouns are the first subject marker listed in the table prefixed to -βu. The plural forms may derive from Austronesian; see Warembori for details.

Like many Papuan languages of northern New Guinea, Yoke has suppletive singular/plural forms for nouns.

Yoke is polysynthetic, with noun incorporation in its verbs. For example,

eβu e- ɾaβ- upia -βi -ɾ -a -na -kumamba -o
I 1SG- chop.down- sago.tree -for -THEME -you -with -axe -IND
'I have already chopped down a sago tree for you with an axe.'

(The purpose of the 'thematic' consonant is unclear, but it appears to divide verbs into different classes.)
