= Babar Islands =

Island group in Maluku Province, Indonesia

Coordinates: 7°55′S 129°45′E

Native name: Kepulauan Babar
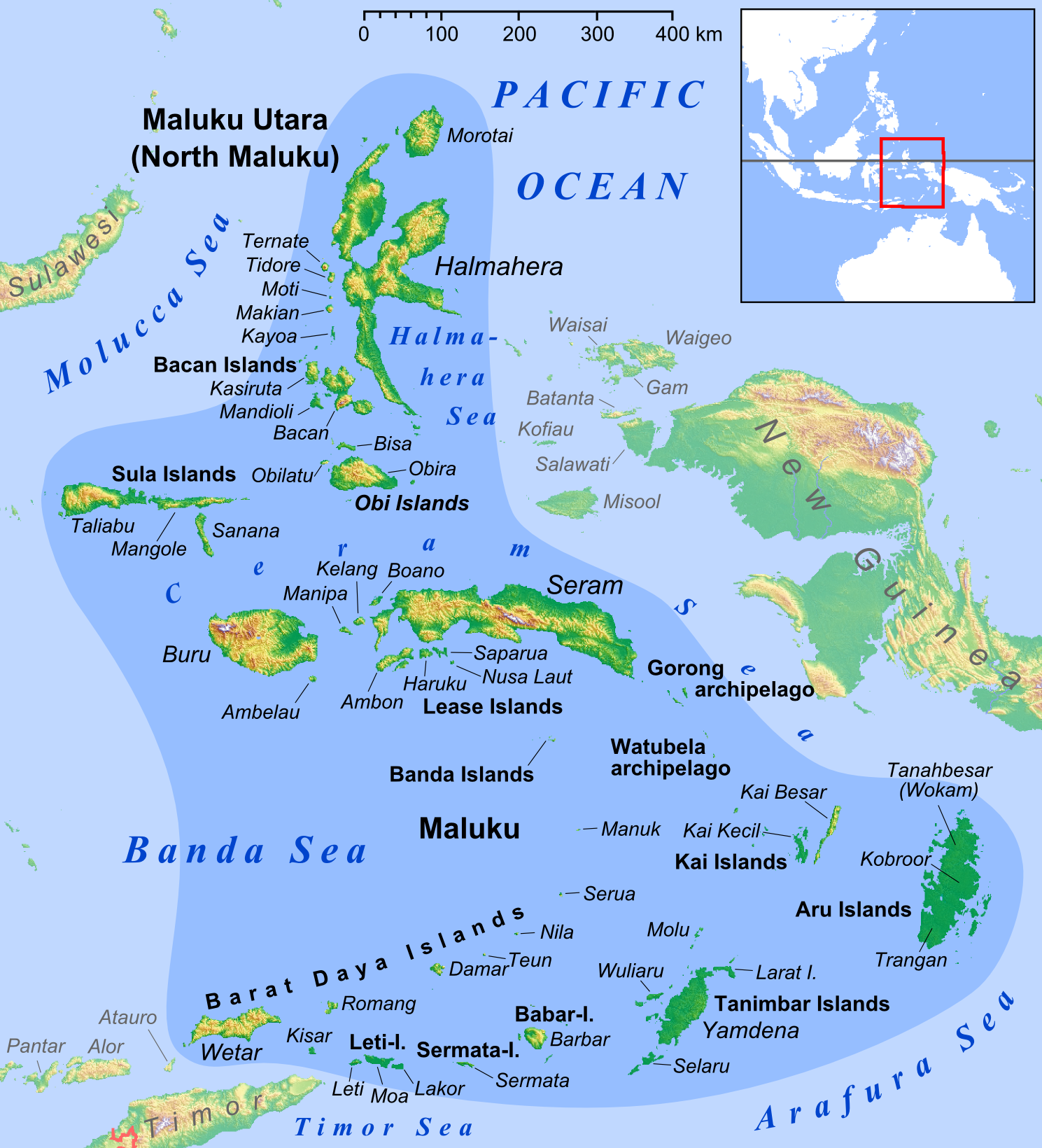
- Babar Islands in the south of the Maluku Islands

- Map of the Babar Islands.

Geography
- Location: Southeast Asia
- Archipelago: Maluku Islands

Administration
- Indonesia
- Province: Maluku

Additional information
- Time zone: IEST (UTC+09:00)

The Babar Islands (Indonesian: Kepulauan Babar; Indonesian pronunciation: [kəpuˌlawan ˈbabar]) are located in Maluku Province, Indonesia between latitudes 7 degrees 31 minutes South to 8 degrees 13 minutes South and from longitudes 129 degrees 30 minutes East to 130 degrees 05 minutes East. The group now constitutes five districts (kecamatan) within the Maluku Barat Daya Regency of Maluku province.

Tepa (a town with a population of about 2,000 people) is the administrative center of the former Babar Islands district ("Kecamatan Pulau-Pulau Babar") now reduced to encompass only the western half of Babar Island together with Dai Island (to the north of Babar), and renamed Babar Barat ("West Babar") District. Wetang Island (lying to the west of Babar) now forms a separate district. The town of Letwurung on the east side of Babar island is the capital of the district formerly called "East Babar" ("Kecamatan Pulau-Pulau Babar Timor") in the east half of the Babar Islands, consisting of the East half of Babar Island, and now simply renamed Babar Timur (East Babar) District. Masela Island (to the south-east of Babar) forms a separate district, as do the islands of Dawelor and Dawera (to the east). The archipelago covers a land area of 759.37 km^{2} and had 17,406 inhabitants at the 2010 Census, but the official estimate as at mid 2023 was 20,586.

The Babar Islands are part of the Banda Sea Islands moist deciduous forests ecoregion.

== Central island ==
The islands take their name from the large central island of Babar which is roughly 32 km (20 mi) across and a circumference of 97 km (60 mi). Babar Island has a maximum elevation of approximately 750 meters and is lightly covered with sub-tropical montane forest, although the 5 rivers and 2 large year-round springs afford tropical forest in their narrow ravine courses.

=== Topography ===
The topography of all the Babar islands is distinctive for their marked stepped appearance, the result of a combination of periodic uplifting of the tectonic plate interacting with the erosive action of the constant ocean waves. Water action on the coral base over the millennia has created many caves and shafts.

=== Agriculture and fisheries ===
Rain is plentiful from December to July so corn, plantains, bananas, cassava, various tubers and red rice (unirrigated) grow plentifully. Fish is the main source of protein. Sufficient potable water on Babar Island is provided by year round springs and shallow wells. Coconut oil is important for consumption while the oily meat called copra, is sold. Other items harvested and sold for export are sea shells, sea weed, sea cucumbers, shark fins, live lizards and birds, cattle, cashews, nutmeg, cloves and eucalyptus oil.

== Smaller islands ==
This situation contrasts markedly with the much smaller islands ringing Babar Island. These are low-lying, uplifted reef and limestone (with the exception of Dai Island, which is largely granite), infertile, not heavily forested and lacking in fresh water sources. The more difficult environment leads the indigenous inhabitants to focus more of their energies on fishing and hand-crafts which are then traded for garden produce from Babar Island. The people collect rain water in large above ground cisterns which can last them through the driest time of the year (September to December). When the drought is longer than usual the water in these tanks is exhausted and the people have to walk miles to the few villages with springs or wells, and queue up for a turn to draw a few liters of water. People camp overnight beside the well waiting their turn. The Indonesian government has provided funds for many more collection tanks for rain water, so the situation has improved markedly in the last few years.

== Transport ==
There is no airport or landing strip in the Babar Islands. Small freighters that have contracts to carry passengers service the islands. It is a minimum twelve-hour ride to the nearest city with an airport where one can catch a commercial flight to other towns in Maluku - these airports being at Tual, Larat, Wonreli (Kisar) and Ambon.

== Religion ==
Most indigenous Babar Islanders are baptised into the Protestant Church of Maluku (Gereja Protestan Maluku, GPM). The GPM's roots are in the Dutch Reformed Church started by the Dutch colonists. Due undoubtedly to the aridity of the islands and the lack of natural resources, there has been no mass transmigration from more populous Indonesian areas. In Tepa, there are 3 other denominations with church buildings: a Catholic church, a Seventh-day Adventist church, and a Pentecostal church. There is also a mosque in Tepa that serves the small community of Muslims. All the other towns have one GPM church each, totaling 56 GPM churches in the entire GPM diocese of Babar islands ("Klasis GPM Pulau-pulau Babar"). While these world faiths are represented, there is much hybridization with the preexisting animist beliefs and practices. The traditional dance of Babar is "Seka".

== See also ==
- Weber Line

== Islands in the Babar Islands cluster (in alphabetic order) ==
- Babar Island
- Dai Island
- Dawelor
- Dawera
- Masela
- Wetang
