= Cenderawasih languages =

Branch of Austronesian languages of Indonesia

Cenderawasih Bay
- Nuclear Cenderawasih Bay, West New Guinea
- Geographic distribution: Cenderawasih Bay, Western New Guinea, Indonesia
- Linguistic classification: Austronesian: Malayo-Polynesian; Central–Eastern Malayo-Polynesian; Eastern Malayo-Polynesian; South Halmahera–West New Guinea; Cenderawasih Bay
- Proto-language: Proto-Cenderawasih Bay
- Subdivisions: Biakic; Yapen; Southwestern

Language codes
- Glottolog: cend1238

The Cenderawasih languages, also known as Nuclear Cenderawasih Bay languages and approximately synonymous with West New Guinea languages, are a branch of Austronesian languages of Indonesia, found in the islands and shoreline of Cenderawasih Bay in the provinces of West Papua, Central Papua and Papua.

Most of the languages are only known from short word lists, but Biak, Wamesa, and Wooi are fairly well attested.

== Historical morphology ==
Reconstructions of subject markers and inalienable possessive markers for Cenderawasih Bay proto-languages according to Kamholz (2015). Note that V = vocalic conjugation, C = consonantal conjugation:

Proto-Cenderawasih Bay:

1sg.	*y- (V), *ya- (C)	1pl.	*t- (incl.), *am- (excl.)
2sg.	*aw- (V), *-u- (C)	2pl.	*m-
3sg.	*dy- (V), *-i- (C)	3pl.	*si-

1sg.	*-ku?	1pl.	*ta-? (incl.), *-mi? (excl.)
2sg.	*-mu	2pl.	*-mu?
3sg.	*-∅?	3pl.	*si-

Proto-Biakic:

1sg.	*y- (V), *ya- (C)	1pl.	*t-, *to- (incl.), *nd-, *ndo- (excl.)
2sg.	*w- (V), *wa-, *-w- (C)	2pl.	*mt-, *mto-
3sg.	*d- (V), *i-, *-y- (C)	3pl.	*s-, *si- (anim.), *n-, *na- (inanim.)

1sg.	*-na, *-ri	1pl.	*to-...-sna (incl.), *nto-...-sna (excl.)
2sg.	*-mi, *-mri	2pl.	*mto-...-sna
3sg.	*-na, *-ri	3pl.	*si-...-sna

Proto-Southwest Cenderawasih Bay:

1sg.	*j-?, *i- (C)	1pl.	*t- (incl.), *am- (excl.)
2sg.	*aw- (V), *a-u- (C)	2pl.	*am-u-
3sg.	*dy- (V), *i-i- (C)	3pl.	*ih-i-

1sg.	?	1pl.	*t-? (incl.), *-mi? (excl.)
2sg.	?	2pl.	*-mu?
3sg.	?	3pl.	*si-

Proto-Yaur-Yerisiam:

1sg.	*j- (V), *i- (C)	1pl.	*k- (incl.), *m- (excl.)
2sg.	*agw- (V), *a-u- (C)	2pl.	*am-u-
3sg.	*dy- (V), *i-i- (C)	3pl.	*ih-i-

1sg.	?	1pl.	*k- (incl.), *m- (excl.)
2sg.	*a-	2pl.	*am-?
3sg.	?	3pl.	*h-

== Languages ==
From Kamholz (2024):

- Nuclear Cenderawasih Bay
  - Biakic
    - Biak (Numfor)
    - Dusner
    - Meoswar
    - Roon
  - Yapen (see more)
  - Southwest Cenderawasih Bay
    - Umar
    - Yaur-Yerisiam
      - Yaur
      - Yerisiam

== Lexical reconstructions ==
Proto-Biakic, the ancestor of the Biakic languages, was reconstructed by Rich (2020).
