= Central–Eastern Malayo-Polynesian languages =

Proposed subgroup of the Austronesian language family

Central–Eastern Malayo-Polynesian
- (disputed)
- Geographic distribution: East Indonesia and Pacific Islands
- Linguistic classification: Austronesian: Malayo-Polynesian; Central–Eastern Malayo-Polynesian
- Subdivisions: Central Malayo-Polynesian (linkage)?; Eastern Malayo-Polynesian

Language codes

The Central–Eastern Malayo-Polynesian (CEMP) languages form a proposed branch of the Malayo-Polynesian languages consisting of over 700 languages (Blust 1993).

== Distribution ==
The Central Malayo-Polynesian languages are spoken in the Lesser Sunda and Maluku Islands of the Banda Sea, in an area corresponding closely to the Indonesian provinces of East Nusa Tenggara and Maluku and the nation of East Timor (excepting the Papuan languages of Timor and nearby islands), but with the Bima language extending to the eastern half of Sumbawa Island in the province of West Nusa Tenggara and the Sula languages of the Sula Islands in the southwest corner of the province of North Maluku. The principal islands in this region are Sumbawa, Sumba, Flores, Timor, Buru, and Seram. The numerically most important languages are Nggahi Mbojo (Bimanese), Manggarai of western Flores, Uab Meto of West Timor, and Tetum, the national language of East Timor.

== Subgrouping ==
Wallacea is the group of islands within the red area. The Weber Line is in blue. The Central Malayo-Polynesian (CMP) languages are located almost exclusively within Wallacea. Other language groups in Wallacea include the North Halmahera, Celebic, and South Sulawesi languages.

In the original proposal, CEMP is divided into Central Malayo-Polynesian (CMP) and Eastern Malayo-Polynesian (EMP). However, CMP is generally understood to be a cover term for the non-EMP languages within CEMP, which form a linkage at best rather than a valid clade.

The Central Malayo-Polynesian languages may form a linkage. They are for the most part poorly attested, but they do not appear to constitute a coherent group. Many of the proposed defining features of CMP are not found in the geographic extremes of the area. Therefore, some linguists consider it a linkage; a conservative classification might consider CMP to be a convenient term for those Central–Eastern languages which are not Eastern Malayo-Polynesian (Grimes 1991).

The Eastern Malayo-Polynesian languages extend from the coasts of Halmahera across the Pacific. This subgroup is still controversial as it is solely based on lexical evidence, with no shared phonological innovations. In contrast, the two individual branches, South Halmahera–West New Guinea and Oceanic, each are well-defined by phonological and lexical innovations, and universally accepted as valid subgroups.

=== Criticism ===
CEMP is rejected as a valid clade by Donohue & Grimes (2008), who do not consider CEMP to even be a linkage. Donohue & Grimes (2008) argue that many features claimed to define CMP or CEMP are also found in some of the more conservative Western Malayo-Polynesian languages and even Formosan languages. Edwards & Grimes (2021) also does not consider CEMP to be a coherent branch.

== See also ==
- Languages of Indonesia
