= Papuan languages =

Non-Austronesian languages of New Guinea and adjacent islands

Papuan
- (geographic)
- Geographic distribution: Indonesia, Papua New Guinea, Solomon Islands, East Timor
- Linguistic classification: (term of convenience)

Language codes
- The historical distribution of the Papuan languages, in red. Tan is Austronesian and grey the historical range of Australian languages.

The Papuan languages are the non-Austronesian languages spoken on the western Pacific island of New Guinea, as well as neighbouring islands in Eastern Indonesia, Solomon Islands, and East Timor. It is a strictly geographical grouping, and does not imply a genetic relationship.

New Guinea is the most linguistically diverse region in the world. Besides the Austronesian languages, there arguably are some 800 languages divided into perhaps sixty small language families, with unclear relationships to each other or to any other languages, plus many language isolates. The majority of the Papuan languages are spoken on the island of New Guinea, with a number spoken in the Bismarck Archipelago, Bougainville Island and the Solomon Islands (for example, Lavukaleve) to the east, and Halmahera, Timor and the Alor archipelago to the west. The westernmost language, Tambora in Sumbawa, is extinct. One Papuan language, Meriam, is spoken within the national borders of Australia, in the eastern Torres Strait.

Several languages of Flores, Sumba, and other islands of eastern Indonesia are classified as Austronesian but have a large number of non-Austronesian words in their basic vocabulary and non-Austronesian grammatical features. It has been suggested that these may have originally been non-Austronesian languages that later borrowed nearly all of their vocabulary from neighboring Austronesian languages, though no connection with the Papuan languages of Timor has been found. In general, the Central–Eastern Malayo-Polynesian languages are marked by a significant historical Papuan influence in their lexicon, grammar, and phonology, and which accounts for much of the diversity of the Austronesian language family.

== Concept ==
The "Papuan languages" are a strictly geographical grouping, and does not imply a genetic relationship. The concept of Papuan (non-Austronesian) speaking Melanesians as distinct from Austronesian-speaking Melanesians was first suggested and named by Sidney Herbert Ray in 1892.

According to William A. Foley (1986):

The term 'Papuan languages' must not be taken in the same sense as 'Austronesian languages'. While all Austronesian languages are genetically related in one family, in the sense that they all descend from a common ancestral language called Proto-Austronesian spoken some 6,000 years ago... [Papuan languages] do not all trace their origins back to a single ancestral language... when a language is termed 'Papuan', this claims nothing more than that a language is not Austronesian.

== Speaker numbers ==
Most Papuan languages are spoken by hundreds to thousands of people; the most populous are found in the New Guinea Highlands, where a few exceed a hundred thousand. These include Western Dani (180,000 in 1993) and Ekari (100,000 reported 1985) in the western (Indonesian) highlands, and Enga (230,000 in 2000), Huli (150,000 reported 2011), and Melpa (130,000 reported 1991) in the eastern (PNG) highlands. To the west of New Guinea, the largest languages are Makasae in East Timor (100,000 in 2010) and Galela in Halmahera (80,000 reported 1990). To the east, Terei (27,000 reported 2003) and Naasioi (20,000 reported 2007) are spoken on Bougainville.

== History of classification ==
Although there has been relatively little study of these languages compared with the Austronesian family, there have been three preliminary attempts at large-scale genealogical classification, by Joseph Greenberg, Stephen Wurm, and Malcolm Ross. The largest family posited for the Papuan region is the Trans–New Guinea phylum, consisting of the majority of Papuan languages and running mainly along the highlands of New Guinea. The various high-level families may represent distinct migrations into New Guinea, presumably from the west.

Statistical analyses designed to pick up signals too faint to be detected by the comparative method, though of disputed validity, suggest five major Papuan stocks (roughly Trans–New Guinea, West, North, East, and South Papuan languages); long-range comparison has also suggested connections between selected languages, but again the methodology is not orthodox in historical linguistics.

The Great Andamanese languages may be related to some western Papuan languages, but are not themselves covered by the term Papuan.

=== Wurm (1975) ===
The most widely used classification of Papuan languages is that of Stephen Wurm, listed below with the approximate number of languages in each family in parentheses. This was the scheme used by Ethnologue prior to Ross's classification (below). It is based on very preliminary work, much of it typological, and Wurm himself has stated that he does not expect it to hold up well to scrutiny. Other linguists, including William A. Foley, have suggested that many of Wurm's phyla are based on areal features and structural similarities, and accept only the lowest levels of his classification, most of which he inherited from prior taxonomies. Foley (1986) divides Papuan languages into over sixty small language families, plus a number of isolates. However, more recently Foley has accepted the broad outline if not the details of Wurm's classification, as he and Ross have substantiated a large portion of Wurm's Trans–New Guinea phylum.

According to Ross (see below), the main problem with Wurm's classification is that he did not take contact-induced change into account. For example, several of the main branches of his Trans–New Guinea phylum have no vocabulary in common with other Trans–New Guinea languages, and were classified as Trans–New Guinea because they are similar grammatically. However, there are also many Austronesian languages that are grammatically similar to Trans–New Guinea languages due to the influence of contact and bilingualism. Similarly, several groups that do have substantial basic vocabulary in common with Trans–New Guinea languages are excluded from the phylum because they do not resemble it grammatically.

Wurm believed the Papuan languages arrived in several waves of migration with some of the earlier languages (perhaps including the Sepik–Ramu languages) being related to the Australian languages, a later migration bringing the West Papuan, Torricelli and the East Papuan languages and a third wave bringing the most recent pre-Austronesian migration, the Trans–New Guinea family.

Papuan families proposed by Wurm (1975) (with approximate numbers of languages)
- Amto–Musan languages (2)
- Burmeso language (isolate)
- Busa language (isolate)
- East Bird's Head languages (3)
- East Papuan languages (36)
- Geelvink Bay languages (12)
- Yuri language (isolate)
- Porome language (isolate)
- Kwomtari–Baibai languages (6)
- Left May languages (7)
- Sepik–Ramu languages (104)
- Sko languages (7)
- Torricelli languages (48)
- Trans–New Guinea languages (598)
- West Papuan languages (26)
- Yalë language (isolate)

Two of Wurm's isolates have since been linked as the

- Lower Mamberamo languages (2),

and since Wurm's time another isolate and two languages belonging to a new family have been discovered,

- Abinomn language (isolate)
- Bayono–Awbono languages (2).

=== Foley (2003) ===
Foley summarized the state of the literature. Besides Trans–New Guinea and families possibly belonging in TNG (see), he accepted the proposals for,

Papuan families other than TNG accepted by Foley (2003)
- Lower Sepik-Ramu (Lower Sepik + Lower Ramu)
- Middle Sepik (incl. Ndu and maybe Sepik Hill)
- Torricelli
- Sko
- Lakes Plain and Cenderawasih Bay (probably related)
- East Bird's Head
- West Bird's Head
- Marind
- Bougainville (2 branches not close to each other: North Bougainville + South Bougainville)

=== Ross (2005) ===
Malcolm Ross re-evaluated Wurm's proposal on purely lexical grounds. That is, he looked at shared vocabulary, and especially shared idiosyncrasies analogous to English I and me vs. German ich and mich. The poor state of documentation of Papuan languages restricts this approach largely to pronouns. Nonetheless, Ross believes that he has been able to validate much of Wurm's classification, albeit with revisions to correct for Wurm's partially typological approach. (See Trans–New Guinea languages.) Ethnologue (2009) largely follows Ross.

It has been suggested that the families that appear when comparing pronouns may be due to pronoun borrowing rather than to genealogical relatedness. However, Ross argues that Papuan languages have closed-class pronoun systems, which are resistant to borrowing, and in any case that the massive number of languages with similar pronouns in a family like Trans–New Guinea preclude borrowing as an explanation. Also, he shows that the two cases of alleged pronoun borrowing in New Guinea are simple coincidence, explainable as regular developments from the protolanguages of the families in question: as earlier forms of the languages are reconstructed, their pronouns become less similar, not more. (Ross argues that open-class pronoun systems, where borrowings are common, are found in hierarchical cultures such as those of Southeast Asia and Japan, where pronouns indicate details of relationship and social status rather than simply being grammatical pro-forms as they are in the more egalitarian New Guinea societies.)

Ross has proposed 23 Papuan language families and 9–13 isolates. However, because of his more stringent criteria, he was not able to find enough data to classify all Papuan languages, especially many isolates that have no close relatives to aid in their classification.

Ross also found that the Lower Mamberamo languages (or at least the Warembori language—he had insufficient data on Pauwi) are Austronesian languages that have been heavily transformed by contact with Papuan languages, much as the Takia language has. The Reef Islands – Santa Cruz languages of Wurm's East Papuan phylum were a potential 24th family, but subsequent work has shown them to be highly divergent Austronesian languages as well.

Note that while this classification may be more reliable than past attempts, it is based on a single parameter, pronouns, and therefore must remain tentative. Although pronouns are conservative elements in a language, they are short and utilise a reduced set of the language's phonemic inventory. Both phenomena greatly increase the possibility of chance resemblances, especially when they are not confirmed by lexical similarities.

Papuan families proposed by Ross (2005)
- Trans–New Guinea (reduced to 466–493 languages)
- ? Extended West Papuan (tentative)
  - West Papuan languages (27)
  - East Bird's Head – Sentani languages (9)
  - Yawa (1–2)
- Mairasi languages (4)
- East Cenderawasih (Geelvink Bay) languages (10)
- Lakes Plain languages (19; upper Mamberamo River)
- Tor–Kwerba languages (17)
- Nimboran languages (5)
- Skou languages (8)
- Border languages (15)
- Left May – Kwomtari languages (13) (problematic)
  - Left May (7)
  - Fas (2)
  - ? Kwomtari (3)
- Senagi languages (2) (perhaps related to Sepik)
- Torricelli languages (40–50) (perhaps related to Sepik)
- Sepik languages (51)
- Ramu – Lower Sepik languages (40) (first proposed by Foley)
- Yuat languages (5)
- Piawi languages (2) (perhaps in Ramu)
- South-Central Papuan languages (22)
- Eastern Trans-Fly languages (4; one in Australia)
- ? Yele – West New Britain languages (tentative)
  - Yélî Dnye (Yele) (isolate)
  - Anêm (isolate)
  - Ata (Pele-Ata, Wasi) (isolate)
- Baining (East New Britain) languages (8)
- North Bougainville languages (4)
- South Bougainville languages (9)
- Central Solomons languages (4)

Language isolates

Sorted by location

north Irian:

- Abinomn language (Baso, Foia)
- Isirawa language (Donohue links it to Kwerba)

Sandaun Province:

- Karkar language (Yuri) – since shown to be a Pauwasi language
- Busa language
- Yalë language (Nagatman)

Sepik River:

- Taiap language (Gapun), located on what had been an offshore island 4000 BCE

Bismarck Archipelago:

- Sulka language, on New Britain
- Kol language, on New Britain
- Kuot language (Panaras), on New Ireland

Other

Former isolates classified by Ross:

- Burmeso language (Taurap), in the East Bird's Head – Sentani languages
- Porome language (Kibiri), in the Kiwai family of Trans–New Guinea
- Morwap language (Elseng), in the Border languages (on basic lexical resemblances)

Languages reassigned to the Austronesian family:

- Lower Mamberamo (Donohue argues this is a relexified Papuan family; Yoke may not belong)
- Kazukuru language (2007)
- Reef Islands – Santa Cruz (2007)

Unclassified due to lack of data:

- Amto–Musan languages (2)
- Kenati (isolate)
- Komyandaret (isolate)
- Maramba (unattested)
- Massep (isolate)
- Molof (isolate)
- Momuna family: Momina, Momuna (Somahai)
- Samarokena (apparently Kwerba)
- Saponi (shares basic vocab, but not pronouns, with Lakes Plains)
- Tause (Ross placed it provisionally in East Bird's Head – Sentani to encourage research, but does not claim it is related)
- Tofamna (isolate)
- Usku (isolate)

Unaccounted for:

- Bayono-Awbono (TNG)
- Pyu (isolate, has been classified as Kwomtari–Baibai)
- Kosare
- Kapori
- Purari (has been linked to Eleman, but with little evidence)
- There is a cluster of languages in West Papua between the upper Taritatu River and the PNG border, including Molof, Usku, and Tofamna listed above but also Namla, Murkim, Lepki, and Kembra, which do not appear to be related to each other or to other languages in the area. Namla, recently discovered, may prove to be related to Tofamna once more data comes in. Murkim and Lepki show some similarities to each other, though these may not be genetic.
- Tambora (unclassified, with one lexical item possibly connecting it to languages of Timor)
- Doso
- Kimki

=== Wichmann (2013) ===
Søren Wichmann (2013) accepts the following 109 groups as coherent Papuan families, based on computational analyses performed by the Automated Similarity Judgment Program (ASJP) combined with Harald Hammarström's (2012) classification. Some of the groups could turn out to be related to each other, but Wichmann (2013) lists them as separate groups pending further research.

9 families have been broken up into separate groups in Wichmann's (2013) classification, which are:

- Biksi (2 groups)
- Dibiyaso-Doso-Turumsa (2 groups)
- Kwalean (2 groups)
- Lower Sepik-Ramu (5 groups)
- Morehead-Wasur (2 groups)
- Nuclear Trans-New Guinea (16 groups)
- Pauwasi (2 groups: Western and Eastern)
- Sentanic (2 groups)
- Sko (2 groups)

Papuan families proposed by Wichmann (2013)
1. West Timor-Alor-Pantar / East Timor-Bunaq
2. South Bougainville
3. Wiru
4. Namla-Tofanma
5. ex-Pauwasi-1 (Western Pauwasi)
6. ex-Nuclear Trans New Guinea-1 (Asmat–Kamoro)
7. Mombum
8. Marindic
9. ex-Nuclear Trans New Guinea-2 (Awyu–Dumut)
10. Inland Gulf
11. ex-Nuclear Trans New Guinea-3 (Oksapmin)
12. ex-Nuclear Trans New Guinea-4 (Ok)
13. ex-Nuclear Trans New Guinea-5 (Finisterre-Huon)
14. Goilalan
15. ex-Nuclear Trans New Guinea-6 (Chimbu–Wahgi)
16. Kamula / Awin–Pa / Bosavi / East Strickland
17. ex-Dibiyaso-Doso-Turumsa-1 (Dibiyaso)
18. Angan
19. Duna-Bogaya
20. ex-Nuclear Trans New Guinea-7 (Engan)
21. Sepik / Ndu / Walio
22. Greater Kwerba / Tor-Orya
23. Nimboran / Kapauri / Border
24. Elseng
25. North Halmahera
26. Yalë
27. ex-Dibiyaso-Doso-Turumsa-2 (Doso-Turumsa)
28. Kwomtari
29. ex-Nuclear Trans New Guinea-8 (Mek)
30. ex-Morehead-Wasur-1 (Yey, Nambu)
31. Hatam-Mansim
32. Mor
33. Pahoturi / Eastern Trans-Fly
34. ex-Nuclear Trans New Guinea-9 (Kainantu-Goroka)
35. Yareban / Mailuan
36. Dem
37. ex-Nuclear Trans New Guinea-10 (Southern Adelbert: Nend, Atemble, Apali, Faita, Anamgura, Mum, Musak, Moresada, Utarmbung, Anam, Paynamar, Sileibi, Wadaginam)
38. ex-Nuclear Trans New Guinea-11 (Dani)
39. West Bomberai
40. ex-Nuclear Trans New Guinea-12 (Wissel Lakes)
41. Koiarian
42. Kaki Ae
43. Moraori
44. Mawes
45. Kolopom
46. Bulaka River
47. Molof
48. Yuat-Maramba
49. Kaure-Narau
50. Tirio
51. Kayagar
52. Suki-Gogodala / Waia / Kiwaian
53. ex-Nuclear Trans New Guinea-13 (Binanderean + Kowan: Binandere, Baruga, Kowan, Korafe, Suena, Waskia, Zia)
54. Fasu-East Kutubu
55. Pawaia-Teberan
56. Turama-Kikori
57. North Bougainville
58. Eleman
59. Mairasi
60. Touo
61. ex-Kwalean-1 (Humene-Uare)
62. Tanahmerah
63. Savosavo
64. Bilua
65. Manubaran
66. Kuot
67. Burmeso
68. Amto-Musan / Left May / Busa
69. ex-Sentanic-1 (Sowari)
70. ex-Lower Sepik-Ramu-1 (Ap Ma)
71. Taiap
72. ex-Sko-1 (I'saka, Skou, Vanimo, Wutung; Dusur, Leitre)
73. ex-Lower Sepik-Ramu-2 (Nor–Pondo: Angoram, Chambri, Nor, Kopar, Yimas)
74. Geelvink Bay
75. Konda-Yahadian
76. South Bird's Head family / Inanwatan
77. Nuclear Torricelli
78. Urim
79. Ata
80. Monumbo
81. ex-Sentanic-2 (Sentani proper)
82. ex-Lower Sepik-Ramu-3 (Banaro)
83. Yawa
84. ex-Kwalean-2 (Mulaha)
85. Lavukaleve
86. Anem
87. ex-Morehead-Wasur-2 (Kunja)
88. Papi
89. Mpur
90. Abun / Maybrat / West Bird's Head
91. Lakes Plain
92. Pyu
93. ex-Biksi-1 (Kimki)
94. ex-Sko-2 (Rawo, Barupu; Poo, Ramo, Sumararo, Womo)
95. ex-Biksi-2 (Yetfa)
96. Yeli Dnye
97. Lepki–Murkim
98. ex-Pauwasi-2 (Eastern Pauwasi)
99. East Bird's Head
100. Kosare
101. Usku
102. ex-Nuclear Trans New Guinea-14 (Croisilles)
103. ex-Nuclear Trans New Guinea-15 (Kobon)
104. Senagi
105. Piawi
106. ex-Lower Sepik-Ramu-4 (Rao)
107. ex-Lower Sepik-Ramu-5 (Kire, Kaian, Aruamu)
108. ex-Nuclear Trans New Guinea-16 (Croisilles)

An automated computational analysis (ASJP 4) by Müller, Velupillai, Wichmann et al. (2013) found lexical similarities among the following language groups. Note that some of these automatically generated groupings are due to chance resemblances.

Selected Papuan family groupings in the ASJP World Language Trees of Lexical Similarity (version 4)
- Yuat, Kwalean, Mailuan
- Lower Sepik, Monumbo
- Lakes Plain, Wipi, Marind
- Pyu, Kimki
- Biksi, Yele
- Lepki-Murkim, Karkar-Yuri
- Skou, Kaure-Usku, Marienberg
- Mairasi, Mpur
- Touo, Savosavo, Bilua
- Angan, Sepik
- Binandere, Waskia, Tiwi, Senagi
- Border, Elseng
- Kwerba, Nimboran
- Mek, Tayap, Abau, Yale
- North Halmahera, Timor-Alor-Pantar
- West Bomberai, Dani, Oriomo, Morehead
- Meyah, Sougb, Hatam
- Kainantu, Yareban-Manubaran
- Kwomtari, Pawaia, Kwalean
- Sentani, Busa, Amto-Musan, Left May
- Lavukaleve. Further datails in the Spanish version), Anem, Urim
- Gorokan
- Kaure, Makayam
- Gogodala, Tabo, Kiwaian, Madang
- Kayagaric, Mor, Bulaka River
- North Bougainville, Eleman
- Engan, Duna-Bogaya
- Marind, Asmat-Kamoro, Mombum-Kolopom
- Dubu-Towei, Wiru
- Tofanma, Turama-Kikorian
- Awyu
- Inland Gulf, Ok-Oksapmin
- Bosavi, East Strickland, Kapauku, Doso
- Kutubuan
- Angan
- Kamula, Awin-Pa, Goilalan, Leonard Schultze
- Koiarian
- Purari, Kaki Ae
- Chimbu-Wahgi, Finisterre-Huon

=== Palmer (2018) ===
Bill Palmer et al. (2018) propose 43 independent families and 37 language isolates in the Papuasphere, comprising a total of 862 languages. A total of 80 independent groups are recognized. While Pawley & Hammarström's internal classification of Trans-New Guinea largely resembles a composite of Usher's and Ross' classifications, Palmer et al. do not address the more tentative families that Usher proposes, such as Northwest New Guinea.

The coherence of the South Bird's Head, East Bird's Head, Pauwasi, Kwomtari, and Central Solomons families are uncertain, and hence are marked below as "tentative."

Papuan families proposed by Palmer (2018)

Papuan independent language families (43 families)

- Trans New Guinea (431)
- Torricelli (50)
- Sepik (45)
- Lower Sepik-Ramu (35)
- Yam (27)
- Timor-Alor-Pantar (26)
- Tor-Kwerba (23)
- Lakes Plain (20)
- Border (14)
- Sko (13)
- East Cenderawasih Bay (10)
- North Halmahera (10)
- South Bird's Head (10) [tentative; 3 families?]
- Kwomtari (6) [tentative; 4 families?]
- Leonard Schultze (6)
- Upper Yuat (6)
- West Bird's Head (6)
- East Bird's Head (5) [tentative; 2 families?]
- Baining (5)
- Pauwasi (5) [tentative; 2 families?]
- Nimboran (5)
- Yuat (5)
- Left May (5)
- Pahoturi River (5)
- Eleman (5)
- North Bougainville (4)
- South Bougainville (4)
- Central Solomons (4) [tentative; 4 isolates?]
- Oriomo (4)
- Sentani (4)
- Mairasi (3)
- Butam-Taulil (2)
- Bayono-Awbono (2)
- Teberan (2)
- Kaure (2)
- Lepki (2)
- Senagi (2)
- Tofanma (2)
- Yapen (2)
- Amto-Musan (2)
- Doso-Turumsa (2)
- Komolom (2)
- Yelmek-Maklew (2)

Papuan isolates and unclassified languages (37 total)

Bird's Head Peninsula / Bomberai Peninsula (5)

- Abun
- Mpur
- Maibrat
- Mor
- Tanah Merah

North coast / hinterland (12)

- Abinomn
- Burmeso
- Elseng
- Kapauri
- Kembra
- Keuw
- Kimki
- Massep
- Mawes
- Molof
- Usku
- Yetfa

Central West Papua (2)

- Dem
- Uhunduni

Sepik-Ramu basin (3)

- Busa
- Taiap
- Yadë

Gulf of Papua / hinterland (8)

- Dibiyaso
- Kaki Ae
- Kamula
- Karami
- Pawaia
- Porome
- Purari
- Tabo

Bismarck Archipelago (6)

- Anêm
- Ata
- Kol
- Kuot
- Makolkol
- Sulka

Rossel Island (Louisiade Archipelago) (1)

- Yélî Dnye

=== Glottolog 4.0 (2019) ===
Glottolog 4.0 (2019), based partly on Usher, recognizes 70 independent families and 55 isolates.

Papuan families proposed in Glottolog 4.0

Families (70)

- Nuclear Trans-New Guinea (314)
  - Subgroups:
  - Madang (106)
  - Finisterre-Huon (61)
  - Asmat-Awyu-Ok (49)
  - Kainantu-Goroka (28)
  - Chimbu-Wahgi (17)
  - Enga-Kewa-Huli (14)
  - Dani (13)
  - Greater Binanderean (13)
  - Mek (8)
  - Paniai Lakes (5)
- Nuclear Torricelli (55)
- Sepik (36)
- Lower Sepik-Ramu (30)
- Timor-Alor-Pantar (23)
- Lakes Plain (20)
- Morehead-Wasur (19)
- Anim (17)
- Border (15)
- North Halmahera (15)
- Angan (13)
- Ndu (13)
- Tor-Orya (13)
- Geelvink Bay (10)
- Sko (10)
- Dagan (9)
- South Bougainville (9)
- Greater Kwerba (8)
- Koiarian (8)
- Mailuan (8)
- Bosavi (7)
- Baining (6)
- East Strickland (6)
- Goilalan (6)
- Kiwaian (6)
- Left May (6)
- South Bird's Head (6)
- Eleman (5)
- Nimboranic (5)
- Pauwasi (5)
- West Bird's Head (5)
- Yareban (5)
- Yuat (5)
- Arafundi (4)
- Eastern Trans-Fly (4)
- North Bougainville (4)
- Sentanic (4)
- Suki-Gogodala (4)
- Turama-Kikori (4)
- Walioic (4)
- East Bird's Head (3)
- Kamula-Elevala (3)
- Kayagaric (3)
- Kolopom (3)
- Kwalean (3)
- Mairasic (3)
- Ulmapo (3)
- West Bomberai (3)
- Amto-Musan (2)
- Baibai-Fas (2)
- Bayono-Awbono (2)
- Bogia (2)
- Bulaka River (2)
- Doso-Turumsa (2)
- East Kutubu (2)
- Hatam-Mansim (2)
- Inanwatan (2)
- Konda-Yahadian (2)
- Kwomtari-Nai (2)
- Lepki-Murkim (2)
- Manubaran (2)
- Mombum-Koneraw (2)
- Namla-Tofanma (2)
- Pahoturi (2)
- Piawi (2)
- Senagi (2)
- Somahai (2)
- Taulil-Butam (2)
- Teberan (2)
- Yawa-Saweru (2)

Isolates (55)

- Abinomn
- Abun
- Ambakich
- Anem
- Ap Ma
- Asabano
- Bilua
- Bogaya
- Burmeso
- Damal
- Dem
- Dibiyaso
- Duna
- Elseng
- Fasu
- Guriaso
- Kaki Ae
- Kapori
- Karami
- Kaure-Narau
- Kehu
- Kembra
- Kibiri
- Kimki
- Kol
- Kosadle
- Kuot
- Lavukaleve. Further datails in the Spanish version)
- Marori
- Massep
- Mawes
- Maybrat-Karon
- Molof
- Mor
- Mpur
- Odiai
- Papi
- Pawaia
- Pele-Ata
- Purari
- Pyu
- Sause
- Savosavo
- Sulka
- Tabo
- Taiap
- Tambora
- Tanahmerah
- Touo
- Usku
- Wiru
- Yale
- Yele
- Yerakai
- Yetfa

=== Usher & Suter (2024) ===
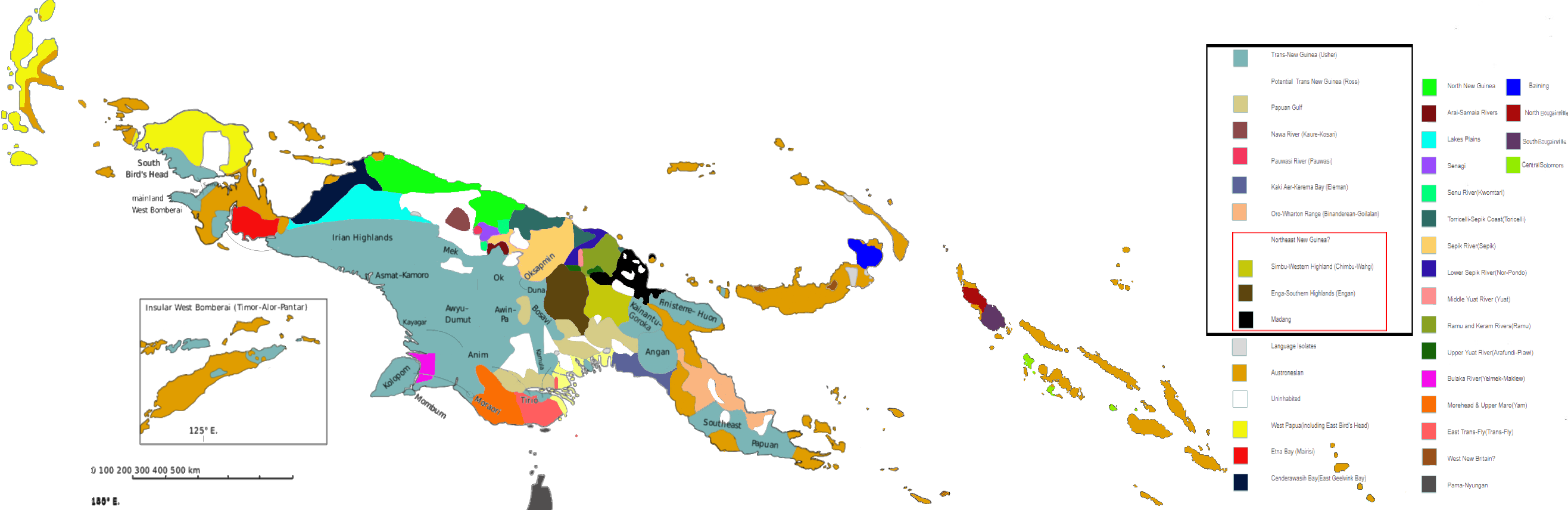
Language families of New Guinea, the North Moluccas, and the Lesser Sunda Islands according to Timothy Usher. Languages of Bougainville, the Solomon Islands, the Torres Strait Islands, and Northern Australia were not included in the study, and they are portrayed here according to current consensus.

The following families are identified by Timothy Usher and Edgar Suter in their NewGuineaWorld project:

Papuan families proposed by Usher & Suter (2024)
- Abinomn
- Arai and Samaia Rivers (unites Left May, Amto–Musan, and Pyu)
- Bulaka River
- Cenderawasih Bay (= East Geelvink Bay)
- Central New Guinea Highlands (Enga – Southern Highlands and Simbu – Western Highlands = Chimbu–Wahgi)
- East Trans-Fly (unites Eastern Trans-Fly, Pahoturi, and Waia)
- Etna Bay (= Mairasi)
- Kaki Ae – Kerema Bay (= Eleman)
- Keram and Ramu Rivers (= Ramu)
- Kibiri-Porome
- Kiwai
- Lakes Plains
- Lower Sepik River
- Madang – Upper Yuat River (unites Arafundi and Piawi)
- Middle Yuat River
- Morehead River (= Yam)
- Nawa River (= Kaure–Kosare)
- Northwest New Guinea (tentative. unites Fas, Sentani, Border, Sko, and Tor–Kwerba–Nimboran)
- Oro – Wharton Range (unites Binanderean and Goilalan)
- Papuan Gulf (tentative. unites Kutubuan–Kikorian, East Strickland, Doso–Turumsa, Gogodala–Suki, and Teberan–Wiru–Pawaia)
- Pauwasi River (expands Pauwasi with several recently discovered languages)
- Senagi
- Senu River (unites Kwomtari, Nagatman, and Busa)
- Sepik River
- Torricelli Range – Sepik Coast (= Torricelli)
- Trans–New Guinea
- West Papuan

In addition, poorly attested Karami remains unclassified. Extinct Tambora and the East Papuan languages have not been addressed, except to identify Yele as an Austronesian language.

=== Greenberg's classification ===
Joseph Greenberg proposed an Indo-Pacific phylum containing the (Northern) Andamanese languages, all Papuan languages, and the Tasmanian languages, but not the Australian Aboriginal languages. Very few linguists accept his grouping. It is distinct from the Trans–New Guinea phylum of the classifications below.

== External relations ==
Joseph Greenberg proposed that the Andamanese languages (or at least the Great Andamanese languages) off the coast of Burma are related to the Papuan or West Papuan languages. Stephen Wurm stated that the lexical similarities between Great Andamanese and the West Papuan and Timor–Alor families "are quite striking and amount to virtual formal identity [...] in a number of instances". However, he considered this not evidence of a connection between (Great) Andamanese and Trans–New Guinea, but of a substratum from an earlier migration to New Guinea from the west.

Greenberg also suggested a connection to the Tasmanian languages. However, the Tasmanian peoples were isolated for perhaps 10,000 years, their disappearance wiped out their languages before much was recorded of them, and few linguists expect that they will ever be linked to another language family.

William A. Foley (1986) noted lexical similarities between R. M. W. Dixon's 1980 reconstruction of proto-Australian and the languages of the East New Guinea Highlands. He believed that it was naïve to expect to find a single Papuan or Australian language family when New Guinea and Australia had been a single landmass for most of their human history, having been separated by the Torres Strait only 8000 years ago, and that a deep reconstruction would likely include languages from both. However, Dixon later abandoned his proto-Australian proposal, and Foley's ideas need to be re-evaluated in light of recent research. Wurm also suggested the Sepik–Ramu languages have similarities with the Australian languages, but believed this may be due to a substratum effect, but nevertheless believed that the Australian languages represent a linguistic group that existed in New Guinea before the arrival of the Papuan languages (which he believed arrived in at least two different groups).

== Typology ==
The West Papuan, Lower Mamberamo, and most Torricelli languages are all left-headed, as well as the languages of New Britain and New Ireland. These languages all have SVO word order, with the exception of the language isolate Kuot, which has VSO word order. All other Papuan languages are right-headed.

Tonal Papuan languages include the Sko, Lepki, Kaure, Kembra, Lakes Plain, and Keuw languages.

== See also ==
- Trans–New Guinea languages
- Proto-Trans–New Guinea language
