= Rawo language =

Skou language spoken in Papua New Guinea

Rawo
- Native to: Papua New Guinea
- Region: Sandaun Province
- Native speakers: 640 (2003)
- Language family: Skou: Serra Hills; Rawo

Language codes
- ISO 639-3: rwa
- Glottolog: rawo1244
- ELP: Rawo
- Coordinates: 2.832437°S 141.624155°E

Rawo is a Papuan language in the Skou family, spoken on the north coast of Papua New Guinea in the vicinity of the village of Leitre (Laitre) (2.832437°S 141.624155°E) in Bewani/Wutung Onei Rural LLG, Sandaun Province.

The language of Leitre itself is more closely related to Vanimo. Although Rawo and Leitre are both in the Skou family, they are in different branches of the family.
