= Sko =

Sko or SKO may refer to:

- Kanuri language, Standard Kanuri Orthography
- S-K-O, originally Schuyler, Knobloch and Overstreet, an American country music group
- S-Ko, a character in the Guilty Gears fighting game series
- Skou languages or Sko languages, group of languages spoken on New Guinea
  - Skou language or Sko language, a language of West Papua, Indonesia
- Osnabrück Canal (German: Stichkanal Osnabrück) in Germany
- Sadiq Abubakar III International Airport, Sokoto, Nigeria
- Seko Tengah language (ISO 639-3: sko), an Austronesian language spoken on Sulawesi, Indonesia
- Shopko, an American retailer
- Swiss Communist Organization (German: Schweizerische Kommunistische Organisation)
