= Pasi, Papua New Guinea =

Pasi is a settlement near the coast of Sandaun Province, Papua New Guinea, to the west of the province capital of Vanimo. It is four hours walk from the village of Krisa, of which it is an offshoot. It is located in Bewani-Wutung Onei Rural LLG.

Pasi is the largest I'saka-speaking settlement outside of Krisa.
