= I'saka language =

Skou language spoken in Papua New Guinea

Isaka
- Krisa
- Region: Sandaun Province, Papua New Guinea
- Native speakers: 420 (2003)
- Language family: Skou: Isaka

Language codes
- ISO 639-3: ksi
- Glottolog: kris1246
- ELP: I'saka
- Coordinates: 2.845832°S 141.287516°E

Isaka (I’saka) is the language spoken by the people of the villages of Krisa (2.845832°S 141.287516°E) and Pasi in Sandaun Province, Papua New Guinea. It has also been referred to as Krisa, after the village, although this name is not actually a possible word in the language itself. The sole published source for the language is Donohue and San Roque (2004) (see references), although the authors of this have also Identified I’saka material in Donald Laycock's unpublished fieldnotes.

Isaka is spoken in Krisa and Pasi villages of Bewani/Wutung Onei Rural LLG in Sandaun Province, Papua New Guinea. I'saka presence on the coast is very recent, as they have settled in the coastal area only within the past few decades.

== Phonology ==
Apart from segmental phonemes, I’saka and also make suprasegmental distinctions in tone and nasality.

=== Segmental phonemes ===
==== Consonants ====
There are the following consonants in I’saka:

		Bilabial	Dento-Alveolar	Palatal	Velar
Stop	Voiced	b ~ m	d ~ n		
Stop	Voiceless	p ~ ɸ	t		k
Fricative		p ~ ɸ	s		
Semivowel		w		j	

[p], [ɸ], and occasionally [f] are heard in non-contrastive free variation, making them reflexes of a single phoneme (transcribed p). Donohue and San Roque (2004) suggest that there was an earlier phonemic or allophonic contrast which is in the process of merging, perhaps under the influence of neighboring languages and Tok Pisin. The voiced stops (and semivowels) are nasalized before nasal vowels.

==== Vowels ====
There are five oral vowel phonemes distinguished by most speakers, although older speakers sometimes also distinguish a high central rounded vowel /ʉ/.

Oral vowels
	front	central	back
high	i	(ʉ)	u
mid	ɛ		ɔ
low		a	

Vowels also occur nasalized, and these nasalize preceding voiced stops. For example, /bɔ̌w/ 'heart' (with a rising tone) is pronounced [bǒw], while /bɔ̃̌w/ 'none' is pronounced [mõ̌w̃]. (These are spelled bou and mou; after other consonants, nasal vowels are spelled with a final -ng: that is, voiceless pa, pang, ta, tang, ka, kang, voiced stops ba, ma, da, na, other sa, sang, wa, wang, ya, yang.)

Donohue & San Roque (2004) present nasality as a suprasegmental feature of the syllable, rather than of the vowel.

=== Tone ===
The tone system makes four tone contrasts on single syllables, high, low, rising, and falling. Less than half the theoretically possible tone patterns (4 x 4) which might be expected on disyllabic roots are actually found. Specifically, low-low is the only sequence of two identical tones found, and the sequence high-rise has not been observed. At least some instances of phonetic low pitch contour represent syllables that are phonologically toneless or underspecified for a tone value

== Grammar ==
Personal pronouns show morphological variants for number (singular, plural, and a dual in first and second person), gender (masculine or non-masculine, marked on third person singular pronouns only) and case (see below). The semantic basis for the grammatical gender system is as follows. The masculine gender indicates 'animate male entities and items immediately associated with them', and the non-masculine gender indicates anything else, i.e. a generic, default gender.

I’saka has fairly strict Subject–Object–Verb word order for declarative sentences. Personal pronouns have Unmarked, Nominative, Accusative and Possessive case forms. The Nominative case pronouns are used for the subjects of transitive and intransitive verbs, the accusative pronouns for the objects of transitives. Pronouns in oblique roles take the Unmarked case form. The Unmarked case forms can also be used in place of Nominative and Possessive pronouns, but the significance of the choice is not clear. Nouns do not have case marking in core grammatical roles, although there are suffixes for Instrumental, Accompaniment/Location and Predicate possessor.

Verbs have more obligatory morphological marking than nouns. There are prefixes agreeing with the subject. A subset of transitive verbs mark their objects, either by means of an object suffix, or by suppletion of the verb stem. Most verbs do not have object marking.
