= Puari language =

Endangered Skou language of Papua New Guinea

Puare
- Region: Sandaun Province
- Native speakers: 35 (2003)
- Language family: Skou: Serra Hills; Puare

Language codes
- ISO 639-3: pux
- Glottolog: puar1240
- ELP: Puare
- Puari is classified as Critically Endangered by the UNESCO Atlas of the World's Languages in Danger.

Puare (Puari) is a nearly extinct Papuan language of Papua New Guinea.
