= Leitre language =

Papuan language of Papua New Guinea

Leitre
- Native to: Papua New Guinea
- Region: Leitre, Sandaun Province
- Language family: Skou: Western; Leitre

Language codes
- ISO 639-3: None (mis)
- Glottolog: leit1234

Leitre is a Papuan language in the Skou family, spoken on the north coast of Papua New Guinea in the village of Leitre (Laitre) (2.832437°S 141.624155°E) in Bewani-Wutung Onei Rural LLG, Sandaun Province.

== See also ==
- Rawo language

== Sources ==
- Foley, William A. (2018). "The Languages of the Sepik-Ramu Basin and Environs". In Palmer, Bill (ed.). The Languages and Linguistics of the New Guinea Area: A Comprehensive Guide. The World of Linguistics. Vol. 4. Berlin: De Gruyter Mouton. pp. 197–432. ISBN 978-3-11-028642-7.
