= Lido, Papua New Guinea =

Lido
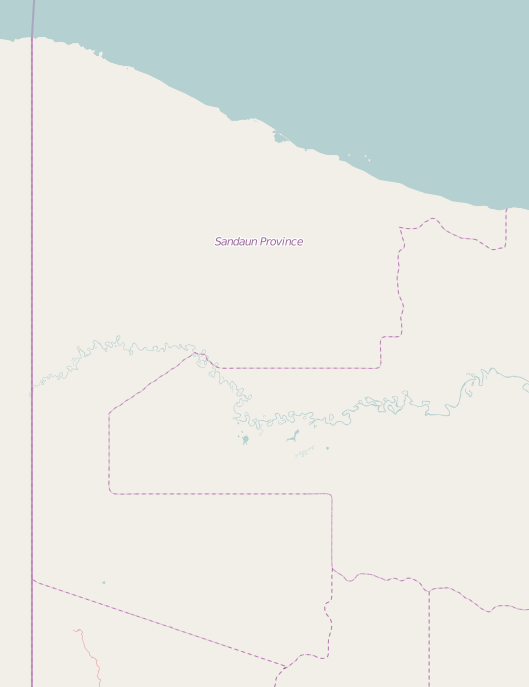
- Location within Sandaun Province
- Coordinates: 2°39′47″S 141°16′34″E
- Country: Papua New Guinea
- Province: Sandaun Province (West Sepik)
- District: Vanimo-Green River

Languages
  - Main languages: Tok Pisin
- Time zone: UTC+10 (AEST)
- Climate: Af

Lido is a large village on the north-western coast of Papua New Guinea, close to Vanimo, and approximately 45 minutes drive from the border with Indonesia. It is located in Bewani-Wutung Onei Rural LLG. The village forms a stereotypical tropical village, including coconut trees and grass-roofed huts.

From October to February there is a reasonable surf, and despite its isolation, surfing travellers are slowly becoming aware of its potential. Locals claim their ancestors invented surfing using body boards.
