= Aitape Skull =

Holocene human remains

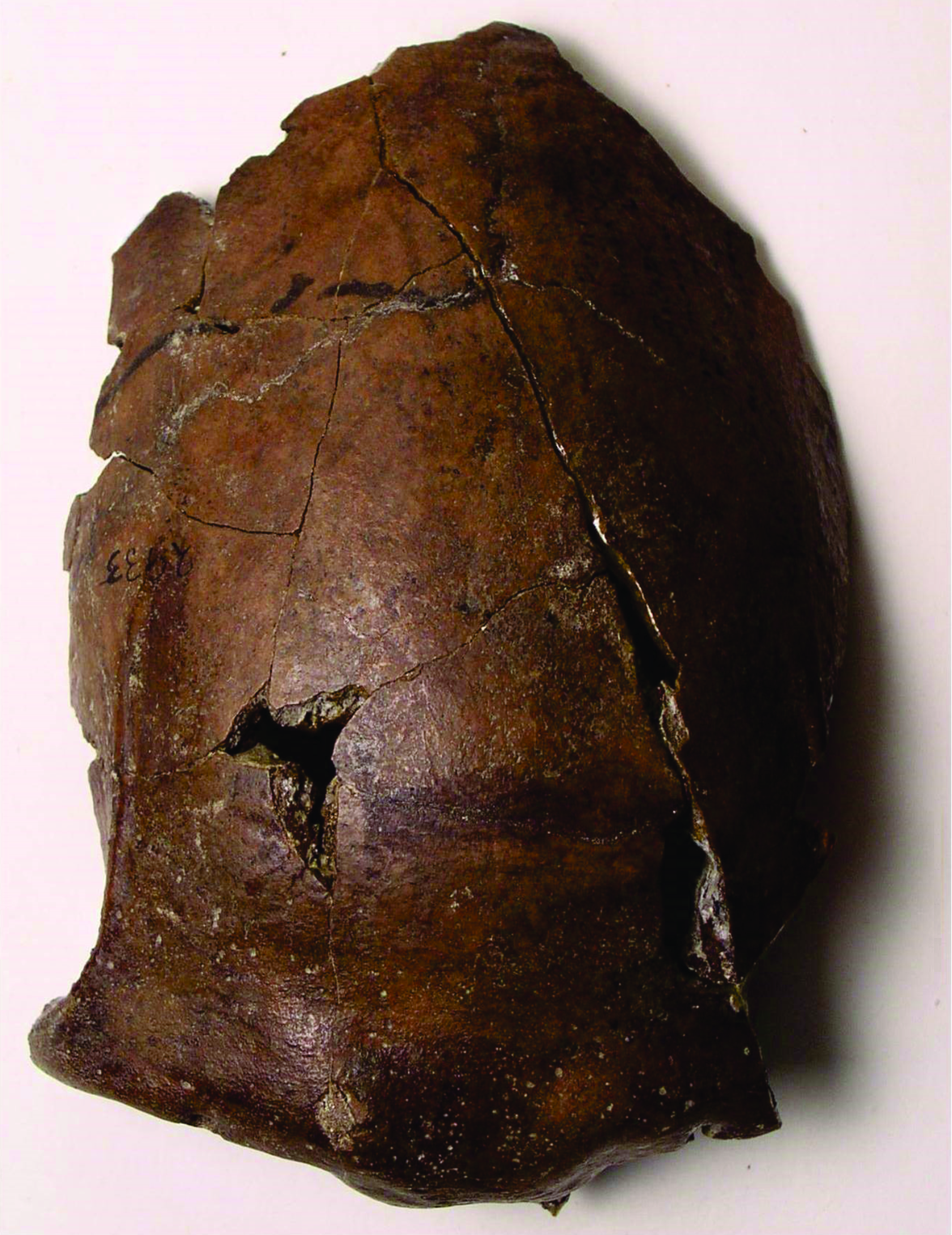
The Aitape Skull consists of four fragments that form most of the frontal bone and some adjoining bone.

The Aitape Skull is an incomplete skull discovered in a river bank of northwest Papua New Guinea. It consists of four pieces, which form most of the frontal bone and some adjoining area. The rest of the skull was not found. The sex and ethnicity of the individual the fragments came from is unknown.

The skull fragments were found in 1929 during a geological expedition. Initial analysis considered it a possible Homo erectus fossil from the Pleistocene, however, later research determined it was from a modern human and dated it to the Holocene, specifically around 6,000 to 7,000 years ago. Despite this more recent origin, it remains one of only two human remains found in Papua New Guinea from before the late Holocene, despite human habitation on the island being thought to go back at least 35,000 years.

The location of the skull's discovery was near the base of the Torricelli Range. At the time it was buried, this area would have been at sea level and on the coast. Other debris found near the skull included animal and plant remains from terrestrial and marine environments. Early research considered the area to have been coastal mangroves that were regularly flooded by the ocean. Later research suggested that the skull and other debris were deposited by a tsunami rather than by regular flooding. The nearby coastline continues to experience tsunamis. The Aitape Skull may belong to the world's oldest known tsunami victim.

== Background ==
Papua New Guinea has been inhabited for at least 35,000 years, but its northern coastline was likely unsuitable for habitation until around 6,000 years ago. The few pieces of archaeological evidence of human habitation of the northern coast before this time are in upland areas. The coastline would have become habitable as the sea level began to stabilise, which transformed the rocky coastline into a flatter area with sheltered lagoons. Evidence for large-scale settlement along this newly formed coastline goes back 2,000 years.

While now conducive to human habitation, the northern coast remains tectonically active and thus highly exposed to natural disasters such as tsunamis. The area has a number of minor tectonic plates impacted by the Australian plate, raising the mountains of the island and causing frequent large earthquakes. Seven large tsunamis have been recorded in the area since 1907. The 1907 earthquake turned what was a lake into the Sissano Lagoon. The 1998 Papua New Guinea earthquake produced a tsunami that killed over 2,000 people in the Sissano Lagoon, with waves 15 metres (49 ft) high reaching 5 kilometres (3.1 mi) inland.

== Remains ==
The skull consists of four large fragments. They form most of the frontal bone and an adjoining fragment. The remainder of the skull was not found. The pieces are not fossilised.

Research in 1944 suggested that the remains came from a 45-year-old woman related to present-day Indigenous Australians. However, research in 1996 suggested the individual may have been male, and more likely came from a population related to the Indigenous people of New Guinea. The most recent work suggests the individual was related to prehistoric Southeast Asian peoples. The limited remains make identification challenging.

== Discovery and research ==
The Paniri Creek lies at the foothills of the Torricelli Range, which would have been coastline at the time the skull became buried.

The Aitape Skull was discovered in April 1929 by Paul S. Hossfeld, buried by the bank of the Paniri Creek. This was at an elevation of 170 feet (52 m) in the foothills of the Barida Range (part of the wider Torricelli Range). This location is around 11–12 kilometres (6.8–7.5 mi) inland from the coastal Sissano Lagoon. Around 6,000 or 7,000 years ago, the site would have been part of an intertidal mudflat near the coast and at sea level, having since been uplifted about 1 millimetre (0.039 in) per year (also calculated as 14 metres (46 ft) per 1,000 years). The discovery was made during a geological survey seeking to find petroleum.

The skull fragments were found within a hollow filled with debris, including plant material (coconut shells, fibres, driftwood), shells and foraminifera from terrestrial and marine environments, and sand and mud. This collection of material was buried under about 4 metres (13 ft) of other material. This initial collection was carried out over just four hours. Further research of the discovery site took place in 1962 and 2014, although these did not uncover any other human remains.

The remains were originally considered to be from the Pleistocene, raising speculation that it provided evidence that Homo erectus crossed the Wallace Line. However, radiocarbon dating on the skull and other nearby debris in the 1960s placed the skull within the much more recent Holocene.

Early studies suggested the environment at the time was coastal mangroves regularly flooded by the sea. A 2014 study analysed previously collected material and newly collected soil samples and determined that the fossil and soil assemblage resembled assemblages created by the 1998 tsunami. The 1998 tsunami was fast-moving, and many bodies were dismembered either by the wave or by wildlife. The Aitape Skull may be the result of similar processes. This new theory suggests the debris around the skull was caused by a single tsunami rather than the previous theory of regular ocean flooding.

== Significance ==
Remains of vertebrates, including humans, are rare in archaeological evidence of tsunamis. This is despite the damage tsunamis are known to cause in the present, and a history of tsunamis recorded in oral traditions around the Pacific Ocean. Based on analysis of the location of the skull and other debris, it is thought the skull was deposited at the site of its discovery by a tsunami. This suggests that either the individual was a victim of the tsunami, or that they had been recently buried nearby and their remains were carried by the tsunami. If the skull is from a tsunami victim, the individual in question would be the world's oldest known tsunami victim.

The skull find was one of the first archaeological excavations to take place in Papua New Guinea. Until the 21st century it was the only known human remain from Papua New Guinea that pre-dated the late Holocene; it remains one of two, having been joined by the Watinglo mandible.
