= Ipiko language =

Fly River language spoken in Papua New Guinea

Ipiko
- Region: Papua New Guinea
- Native speakers: 350 (2003)
- Language family: Trans–New Guinea: Fly River (Anim); Inland Gulf; Ipiko

Language codes
- ISO 639-3: ipo
- Glottolog: ipik1244
- ELP: Ipiko

Ipiko (Epai, Higa, Ipikoi) is a Papuan language of Papua New Guinea, the most divergent of the Inland Gulf languages. Despite being spoken by only a few hundred people, language use is vigorous. It is spoken in Ipiko (7.435678°S 144.876902°E) and Pakemuba (7.445341°S 144.848146°E) villages, with Ipiko village being located in Amipoke ward, Baimuru Rural LLG, Kikori District, Gulf Province.

== Bibliography ==
Word lists

- Chance, Sydney H. 1926. Vocabulary of Ipikoi. British New Guinea Annual Report 1925–1926: 91–91.
- Petterson, Robert. 1999. Rumu – English – Hiri-Motu Dictionary. Palmerston North, New Zealand: International Pacific College.
- Z’graggen, John A. 1975. Comparative wordlists of the Gulf District and adjacent Areas. In: Richard Loving (ed.), Comparative Wordlists I. 5–116. Ukarumpa: SIL-PNG. (Rearranged version of Franklin ed. 1973: 541–592) with typographical errors.)
