= Mubami language =

Minanibai language spoken in Papua New Guinea

Mubami
- Tao
- Region: Papua New Guinea
- Native speakers: 1,700 (2002)
- Language family: Trans–New Guinea: Fly River (Anim); Inland Gulf; Minanibai; Mubami

Language codes
- ISO 639-3: tsx
- Glottolog: muba1238

Mubami is a Papuan language of Papua New Guinea. It goes by the names Dausame, Tao-Suamato, Tao-Suame, and Ta. The language is used in all age groups and domains of life, including education, and is therefore counted as not presently endangered.

It is spoken in Diwami, Kubeai, Parieme, Paueme, Sogae, Ugu, and Waliho villages on the Guavi and Aramia rivers in Western Province, Papua New Guinea.

A word list of Mubami can be found in Z'graggen (1975).

== Phonology ==
=== Consonants ===
		Labial	Alveolar	Palatal	Velar	Glottal
Nasal		m	n	(ɲ)		
Plosive	voiceless	p	t		k	ʔ
Plosive	voiced	b	d		ɡ	
Fricative	voiceless	(f)	s			h
Fricative	voiced	v			ɣ	
Rhotic			ɾ			
Approximant		w		j		

- [f] is mainly heard as a variant of /p/.
- [ɲ] is heard in the sequence /nj/.

=== Vowels ===
	Front	Central	Back
Close	i		u
Mid	e		o
Open		a	

- /e, o/ can also have realizations of [ɛ, ɔ].
