= Tao language =

Tao may refer to:

- Yami language (Taiwan)
- Mubami language (New Guinea)
