= Iai language =

Iai may refer:

- Purari language (New Guinea), also known as I'ai
- Iaai language (New Caledonia)
