= Arop language =

Oceanic language spoken in Papua New Guinea

Arop-Sissano
- Arop
- Native to: Papua New Guinea
- Region: Sandaun Province
- Native speakers: (1,500 cited 2001)
- Language family: Austronesian: Malayo-Polynesian; Oceanic; Western; Schouten; Siau; Arop-Sissano

Language codes
- ISO 639-3: aps
- Glottolog: arop1242
- Coordinates: 3.08683°S 142.120379°E

Arop-Sissano, or Arop, is an Austronesian language of Arop village (3.08683°S 142.120379°E) in West Aitape Rural LLG, coastal Sandaun Province, Papua New Guinea.
