= Wutung language =

Skou language spoken in Papua New Guinea

Wutung
- Native to: Papua New Guinea, Indonesia
- Region: Sandaun (Papua New Guinea), Papua (Indonesia)
- Ethnicity: 580 inhabitants of Wutung village (2010)
- Native speakers: 900 (2015)
- Language family: Skou: Western; Wutung
- Dialects: Wutung; Musu; Nyao; ?Sangke

Language codes
- ISO 639-3: wut
- Glottolog: wutu1244
- ELP: Wutung
- Coordinates: 2.60857°S 141.010203°E

Wutung (Udung), Musu, and Nyao, are dialects of an unnamed Skou language of Papua New Guinea. They are spoken in Bewani/Wutung Onei Rural LLG of Sandaun Province and in Jayapura, province of Papua, Indonesia. They each take their name from the village in which they are spoken.

Sangke and the languages of several other villages of the interior are reported to be similar, and may be dialects.

Tok Pisin and English are widely spoken in the area, and many Wutung people speak Indonesian too.

== Location ==
Wutung village (2.60857°S 141.010203°E) is on the coast of Sandaun Province, adjacent to the border with Indonesia. There are about 600 people living in Wutung village, most of whom speak Wutung. Traditional Wutung land extends across the border to the Tami River, but while people travel across the border to their garden plots in that area most live in Wutung village. Some Wutung people live on the Indonesian side in Papua, having married Indonesian citizens.

The nearby villages of Musu (12 km east on the coast, at 2.627641°S 141.10172°E—not to be confused with Warung Moso about 10 kms west of the border, in Indonesia) and Nyao Kono (about 12 km due south, at 2.80788°S 141.054278°E) have closely related language varieties which are usually referred to by their village names (Musu and Nyao). These three speech varieties are very closely related and are mutually intelligible.

Wutung village has the only official land border crossing in Papua New Guinea and so has various related facilities such as a customs and immigration office and associated officials.

== Phonology ==
Wutung has fifteen consonants and seven vowels, six of which have nasal variants. This gives a total of 28 phonemes. Wutung also makes suprasegmental distinctions in tone.

=== Consonants ===
Wutung is one of the very few languages that lack velar consonants.

		Labial	Alveolar	Palatal	Glottal
Plosive or Affricate	voiceless	p	t	t͡ʃ	ʔ
Plosive or Affricate	voiced	b	d	d͡ʒ	
Nasal		m	n	ɲ	
Fricative		f	s		h
Approximant		w	l		

=== Vowels ===
Wutung has thirteen vowels, which includes seven oral and six nasal vowels. The table below shows the oral vowels. Each of these vowels, apart from the close-mid vowel ur /ɵ/, has an equivalent nasal vowel. The nasal vowels are indicated using the same symbol as the equivalent oral, but with a following ng, e.g. ca, 'pig' vs. cang 'blossom', the latter having the nasal vowel.

	Front	Central	Back
Close	i /i/		u /u/
Mid	ey /e/	ur /ɵ/	o /o/
Open	e /ɛ/		a /a/

== Pronouns ==
Wutung has a simple system of personal pronouns with three persons (1st, 2nd and 3rd), two numbers (singular and plural) and gender in the third person singular pronouns. The same set of pronouns are used for object and subject.

I	nie	we	netu
thou	me	you	etu
he	qey	they	tetu
she	cey		
