= Piore River =

River in Papua New Guinea

- Location within Papua New Guinea

Location
- Country: Papua New Guinea
- Region: Sandaun Province

Physical characteristics
- Source
  - location: Papua New Guinea
- Mouth
  - coordinates: 3°05′00″S 141°57′00″E

The Piore River is a river in northern Papua New Guinea.

== See also ==
- List of rivers of Papua New Guinea
- Piore River languages
