= Womo language =

Papuan language of Papua New Guinea

Womo
- Womo-Sumararu
- Region: Sandaun Province
- Ethnicity: 190 in Onei village (2000 census); unknown Sumararu
- Native speakers: 6 (2016)
- Language family: Skou: Serra Hills; Womo
- Dialects: Womo; Sumararu

Language codes
- ISO 639-3: wmx
- Glottolog: womo1238
- Coordinates: 2.945603°S 141.848002°E

Womo and Sumararu are a Papuan language of Papua New Guinea. The two varieties are sufficiently divergent that Usher counts them as distinct languages.

Womo is spoken in Onei village (2.945603°S 141.848002°E) of Bewani/Wutung Onei Rural LLG in Sandaun Province.
