= MBK =

MBK or mbk may refer to:

- MBK (Scooter manufacturer), a European company, the successor to Motobécane
- MBK Entertainment, a South Korean entertainment agency/record label, formerly known as Core Contents Media
- MBK Center, a large shopping mall in Bangkok, Thailand
- My Brother's Keeper Challenge, a 2014 White House-sponsored initiative to promote racial justice
- MBK Tower, 72nd on the list of tallest buildings in Dubai
- Mariestads BK, a Swedish football club
- MBK, the initials and pen name of Mehdi Belhaj Kacem, a French-Tunisian philosopher
- MBK, the initials of Russian businessman and politician Mikhail Khodorkovsky
- 2-Hexanone, an organic compound also known as methyl butyl ketone (MBK)
- Maayong Buntag Kapamilya, the regional morning show of ABS-CBN Cebu in the Philippines
- MBK, IATA code for Matupá Airport, Matupá, Brazil
- mbk, ISO 639-3 code for the Malol language of Papua New Guinea
- mBank, WSE stock ticker symbol
