= Serra Hills =

- Location within Papua New Guinea

Highest point
- Elevation: 399 m (1,309 ft)

Geography
- State: Papua New Guinea
- Range coordinates: 2.97887°S 141.78895°E

The Serra Hills are a mountain range in Sandaun Province, Papua New Guinea.

The Serra Hills languages are spoken in the mountain range.

== See also ==
- Serra Hills languages
