= Bobe language =

Bobe may be:

- Wovea language
- Bube language
- Nouri language
