= Serra Hills languages =

Serra Hills
- Geographic distribution: Serra Hills, Sandaun Province, Papua New Guinea
- Linguistic classification: Skou: East; Serra Hills
- Subdivisions: Puari; Rawo; Womo

Language codes
- Glottolog: serr1253

The Serra Hills languages form a branch of Skou languages. They are spoken in the Serra Hills of Sandaun Province, Papua New Guinea.

Languages are,

Puari, Rawo, Womo, Sumararu
