= West Aitape Rural LLG =

Local-level government in Papua New Guinea

- Location within Papua New Guinea
- Coordinates: 3.14°S 141.93°E
- Country: Papua New Guinea
- Province: Sandaun Province
- Time zone: UTC+10 (AEST)

Aitape West Rural LLG is a local-level government (LLG) of Aitape in Sandaun Province, Papua New Guinea.

Sissano Lagoon is located in the LLG. This region made international news on July 17, 1998 when an earthquake with magnitude 7.0 triggered a tsunami that devastated the coastal villages of the area.

The region surrounding the Sissano Lagoon in northcentral New Guinea represents the most linguistically diverse area of the world. The languages spoken in the LLG include the Piore River languages such as Bauni, Torricelli languages such as Olo Pai and Onnele, and Oceanic languages such as Sissano.

In 2019 ward 12 member Sipora Yomun was elected as the President of the West Aitape Rural LLG, and Sandaun (West Sepik) Province also made history that year by electing Hon. Sipora Yomun as its Deputy Governor. She is Papua New Guinea's first ever female Deputy Governor under the Provincial Government and Local Level Government system introduced in 1997.

== Wards ==
- 01. Nimas (Sissano)
- 02. Manyer (Sissano)
- 03. Maindroin (Sissano)
- 04. Pupa (Bauni speakers
- 05. Moriri (Barupu speakers)
- 06. Arop 1 (Arop speakers)
- 07. Arop 2 (Arop speakers)
- 08. Mainyen (Malol speakers)
- 09. Tanyapin (Malol speakers)
- 10. Aipokon (Malol speakers)
- 11. Nengian (Olo Pai speakers)
- 12. Koiniri (Onnele speakers)
- 13. Walwale (Onnele speakers)
- 14. Rome (Onnele speakers)
- 15. Barera (Onnele speakers)
- 16. Kaiye (Onnele speakers)
- 17. Mafoka (Onnele speakers)
- 18. Mori (Momu speakers)
- 19. Mumuru ( Mumuru speakers )
- 20. Sumo (Bouni speakers)
- 21. Ramo (Uni speakers)
- 22. Pou (Bauni speakers)
- 23. Sarai (Sera speakers)
- 24. Rainuk (Sera speakers)
- 25. Amsuku (Onnele speakers)
