= Purari =

Purari may refer to:

- Purari River, Papua New Guinea
- Purari language, a Papuan language of Papua New Guinea
