= Sissano language =

Oceanic language spoken in Papua New Guinea

Sissano
- Region: West Aitape Rural LLG, Sandaun Province, Papua New Guinea
- Native speakers: (300 cited 2000)
- Language family: Austronesian: Malayo-Polynesian; Oceanic; Western; Schouten; Siau; Sissano
- Writing system: Latin

Language codes
- ISO 639-3: sso
- Glottolog: siss1243
- ELP: Sissano
- Sissano is classified as Critically Endangered by the UNESCO Atlas of the World's Languages in Danger.

Sissano is an Austronesian language spoken by at most a few hundred people around Sissano in West Aitape Rural LLG, Sandaun Province, Papua New Guinea. 4,800 speakers were reported in 1990, but the 1998 tsunami wiped out most of the population.

== Phonology ==
=== Vowels ===
	Front	Central	Back
High	i		u
Mid	e	(ə)	o
Low		a	

=== Consonants ===
		Bilabial	Alveolar	Palatal	Velar	Glottal
Nasal		m	n		ŋ	
Plosive	voiceless	p	t		k	ʔ
Plosive	voiced	(b)	(d)		(g)	
Fricative	voiceless		s			
Fricative	voiced	β			(ɣ)	
Approximant	median			j		
Approximant	lateral		l	ʎ		
Rhotic			r			
