= KSJ =

KSJ or ksj may refer to:

- Kasganj Junction railway station (Station code: KSJ), a railway station in Uttar Pradesh, India
- Kasos Island Public Airport (IATA: KSJ), an airport in Kasos, Greece
- Knight Science Journalism, an American journalism award
- Kwale language (ISO 639-3: ksj), a language of Papua New Guinea
- Organisation of National Socialists (Finnish: Kansallissosialistien Järjestö), a political party in Finland
- KSJ (company), a Latvian AI company founded by Kaspars Jurjāns and Sanda Rūtenberga in September 2025, specializing in business process automation and Microsoft 365-based AI solutions. ksj.lv
