= Sissano Lagoon =

Lagoon in Papua New Guinea

- Location within Papua New Guinea Location within Oceania
- Coordinates: 3°03′S 142°05′E
- Basin countries: Papua New Guinea

Sissano Lagoon is a lagoon located in West Aitape Rural LLG, Sandaun Province, Papua New Guinea.

The Piore River languages (also called the Lagoon languages), as well as the Sissano language, are spoken on the shores of the lagoon.

== History ==
The lagoon was heavily affected by a tsunami in 1998.
