= Crisa =

Crisa may refer to:

- Crissa, a town of ancient Phocis, Greece
- CRISA, a Spanish aerospace company
- Erno Crisa (1924-1968), Italian actor

== See also ==
- Krisa, village in Sandaun Province, Papua New Guinea
