= Vanimo Urban LLG =

Local-level government in Papua New Guinea

- Country: Papua New Guinea
- Province: Sandaun Province
- City: Vanimo
- Time zone: UTC+10 (AEST)

Vanimo Rural LLG is a local-level government (LLG) of Sandaun Province, Papua New Guinea.

== Wards vanimo urban ==
- 81. Vanimo
