= Piore River languages =

Branch of Skou languages

Piore River
- Lagoon
- Geographic distribution: Sissano Lagoon area and Piore River watershed, West Aitape Rural LLG, Sandaun Province, Papua New Guinea
- Linguistic classification: Skou: East; Piore River
- Subdivisions: Warapu; Nouri (Bobe)

Language codes
- Glottolog: lago1243

The Piore River or Lagoon languages form a branch of Skou languages. Historically most have been lumped together as a single Warapu language, with Nouri variously classified. They are spoken in the Sissano Lagoon area of West Aitape Rural LLG, Sandaun Province, Papua New Guinea. The Piore River runs to the west of all the languages, and so speakers do not find it an acceptable name. However, it is not clear which name would be better, as the name of the lagoon, 'Sissano', is used for different neighboring languages.

== Languages ==
The Piore River branch was ambiguously named Lagoon by Miller (2017). The older names of the Piore River languages were from village names; Miller submitted that the languages name were actually Bauni, Uni, Bouni, and Bobe. Bobe is coordinate with the rest, which might be considered (divergent) dialects of a single language.

Lagoon (Piore River)

- Bobe (Nouri village)
- Warapu
  - Bauni (Poo and Barapu/Warapu villages)
  - Uni (Ramo village)
  - Bouni (Sumo village)

== Convergence area ==
The Piore River languages have influenced various other languages (other Skou, Kwomtari, Torricelli, and Oceanic languages) that have arrived relatively recently in the Sissano Lagoon area within the last century or so. Sound changes shared by genealogically unrelated languages in the Sissano Lagoon linguistic convergence area include *s > zero; *t/d, *l > r; and loss of tone, which is a phonological feature typical of Skou languages. The Sissano Lagoon convergence zone is at the northeastern end of what Donohue and Crowther refer to as the "North-Central New Guinea" (NCNG) area, which is a highly linguistically and culturally heterogeneous area marked by the lack of widespread trade and cultural diffusion due to geographical isolation among groups; the "NCNG" area ranges from just east of the Lakes Plain region to the western edge of the Sepik basin.
