= HHY =

HHY may refer to:

- Highbury & Islington station, in London
- Hoia Hoia language, spoken in Papua New Guinea
- "Hare Hare Yukai", a song; see List of Haruhi Suzumiya albums
