= Krisa =

Krisa I'saka
- Town
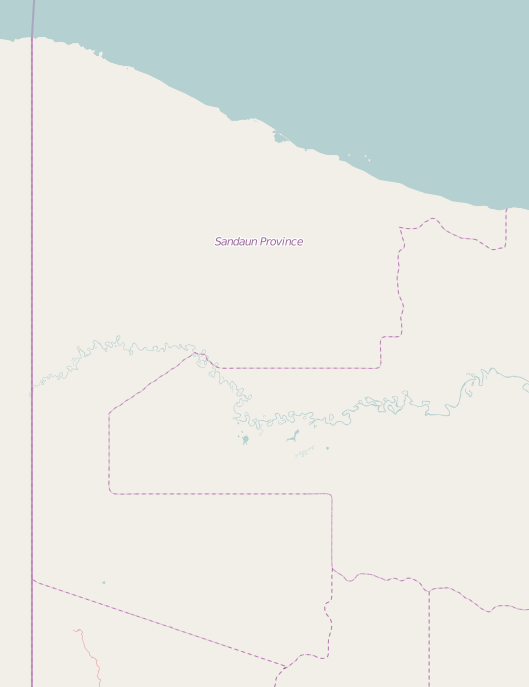
- Location in Sandaun Province Krisa (Papua New Guinea)
- Coordinates: 2°51′S 141°17′E
- Country: Papua New Guinea
- Province: Sandaun Province
- District: Vanimo-Green River District

Population
  - Total: 700
- Time zone: UTC+10 (AEST)
- Languages: Tok Pisin, I'saka

Krisa, also known as Krisi, is a village in Bewani-Wutung Onei Rural LLG, Sandaun Province, Papua New Guinea, 20 kilometers south of the provincial capital of Vanimo. In the local language, the village, its people and the local language itself are all known as I'saka.

The traditional language of Krisa is I'saka, but Tok Pisin is the primary language used. Some also know English.

== See also ==
- I'saka language
- Pasi, Papua New Guinea
