= Sangke language =

Skou language of Papua, Indonesia

Sangke
- Native to: Indonesia
- Region: Papua Province
- Native speakers: (200 cited 1975)
- Language family: Skou: Western; Wutung?; Sangke

Language codes
- ISO 639-3: None (mis)
- Glottolog: sang1347

Sangke is a Skou language or dialect, spoken in Sangke (Nyau Sangke) Village, East Arso District, Keerom Regency in Papua Province, Indonesia. Speakers of the Wutung language report that it is similar to their language, but it's not clear what the relationship is or if it might be a dialect. Being on opposite sides of the international border, Sangke and Wutung have been covered by different surveys (Dutch colonial and SIL International, respectively) and comparative work has not been done.
