= Malol language =

Austronesian language of Papua New Guinea

Malol
- Native to: Papua New Guinea
- Region: West Aitape Rural LLG, Sandaun Province
- Native speakers: (4,600 cited 2000)
- Language family: Austronesian: Malayo-Polynesian; Oceanic; Western; Schouten; Siau; Malol

Language codes
- ISO 639-3: mbk
- Glottolog: malo1245

Malol is an Austronesian language of the Malol village area (3.099291°S 142.226754°E) in Mainyen ward, West Aitape Rural LLG, coastal Sandaun Province, Papua New Guinea. Malol is spoken by an estimated 4,600 speakers.

== Features ==
Malol has 5 vowels and 14 consonants. Grammatically, the language uses SVO constituent order. Its closest relative is Sissano, of which it was considered a dialect until around 2005.
