= Nori language =

Nori may be,

- Nori language (Papuan)
- Nori language (Colombia)
