= Bouni language =

Skou language of Papua New Guinea

Bouni
- Sumo
- Region: Sandaun Province, Papua New Guinea
- Ethnicity: 550 (2000)
- Language family: Skou: Piore River; Warapu; Bouni

Language codes
- ISO 639-3: suo
- Glottolog: boun1247

Bouni (Sumo) is a Skou language of Papua New Guinea. It is spoken in Sumo village (3.071192°S 141.945439°E) of West Aitape Rural LLG, Sandaun Province, located near the border with Indonesia.

== Sources ==
- Miller, Steve A. 2017. Skou Languages Near Sissano Lagoon, Papua New Guinea. Language and Linguistics in Melanesia 35: 1-24.
