= Purari language =

Papuan language of Papua New Guinea

Purari
- Native to: Papua New Guinea
- Region: near the mouth of the Purari River in Gulf Province
- Native speakers: 7,000 (2011)
- Language family: Binanderean–Goilalan: Purari
- Writing system: Latin

Language codes
- ISO 639-3: iar
- Glottolog: pura1257
- ELP: Purari

Purari (Namau) is a Papuan language of Papua New Guinea.

== Names ==
Purari is also known as Koriki, Evorra, I'ai, Maipua, and Namau. "Namau" is a colonial term which means "deaf (lit.), inattentive, or stupid (Williams 1924: 4)." Today people of the Purari Delta find this term very offensive. F. E. Williams reports that the "[a]n interpreter suggests that by some misunderstanding the name had its origin in the despair of an early missionary, who, finding the natives turned a deaf ear to his teaching, dubbed them all 'Namau'." (Williams 1924: 4). Koriki, I'ai, and Maipua refer to self-defining groups that make up the six groups that today compose the people who speak Purari. Along with the Baroi (formerly known as the Evorra, which was the name of a village site), Kaimari and the Vaimuru, these groups speak mutually intelligible dialects of Purari.

The name Baimuru (after Baimuru Rural LLG) is given in Petterson (2019).

== Literature ==
Some literature exists in Purari, mainly Scripture portions produced by missionaries and Bible agencies. The first items in the language were a primer and hymnal published for the London Missionary Society in 1902. Later a New Testament, called 'Ene amua Iesu Keriso onu kuruei voa Nawawrea Eire', was published by the British and Foreign Bible Society in 1920, which was republished in 1947.

== Classification ==
Noting that the few similarities with the Eleman languages may be because of loanwords, Pawley and Hammarström (2018) leave it as unclassified rather than as part of Trans-New Guinea.

== Pronouns ==
Pronouns are 1sg nai, 2sg ni, 1pl enei. The first may resemble Trans–New Guinea *na, but Purari appears to be related to the Binanderean–Goilalan languages.

== Phonology ==
Consonants
	Labial	Alveolar	Velar	Glottal
Plosive	p	(t)	k	ʔ
Nasal	m	n		
Fricative	v			
Approximant		l, r		

The phoneme /t/ is said to appear in a few rare words, but never in casual speech.

Vowels
	Front	Central	Back
High	i		u
Mid	e		o
Low		a	

Unlike most other neighboring Papuan languages, Purari (Baimuru) is non-tonal.

== Vocabulary ==
The following basic vocabulary words are from Franklin (1973), as cited in the Trans-New Guinea database:

gloss	Purari
head	uku
hair	kimari
ear	keporo
eye	inamu
nose	pina
tooth	niʔiri
tongue	anae
leg	ari
louse	kaeriʔi
dog	oroko
bird	nako
egg	munu
blood	aro
bone	laʔaro
skin	kape
breast	ame
tree	iri
man	vake
woman	aʔe
sun	lare
moon	ia
water	ere
fire	iau
stone	rore
name	noe
eat	navai
one	monou
two	leʔeo
