= Western Skou languages =

Western Skou
- Inner Skou, Nuclear Skou; West Vanimo Coast
- Geographic distribution: Sandaun Province, Papua New Guinea; Papua Province, Indonesia
- Linguistic classification: Skou: Western Skou
- Subdivisions: Skou; Vanimo; Wutung; Leitre

Language codes
- Glottolog: skou1239

The Western Skou or Inner Skou languages form a branch of Skou languages. They are spoken in Sandaun Province, Papua New Guinea and Papua Province, Indonesia. They are called Western Skou by Donohue (2002), Inner Sko by Foley (2018), and West Vanimo Coast by Usher (2020).

The languages are,

Skou, Vanimo, Wutung, Leitre
