= Harald Hammarström =

Swedish linguist

- Born: 4 August 1977 (age 49); Västerås, Sweden

Academic background
- Education: Chalmers University
- Thesis: Unsupervised Learning of Morphology and the Languages of the World (2009)

Academic work
- Discipline: Linguist
- Sub-discipline: Computational linguistics; Historical linguistics; Linguistic typology
- Institutions: Uppsala University
- Notable works: Glottolog
- Website: cl.lingfil.uu.se/~harald/

Harald Hammarström (born 1977 in Västerås, Sweden) is a Swedish linguist. He is currently an Associate Senior Lecturer at Uppsala University. Hammarström is especially known for his extensive work on curating Glottolog, a bibliographic database of the world's languages.

Hammarström has previously been employed as a researcher at the Max Planck Institute for the Science of Human History in Jena, Germany and at the Max Planck Institute for Psycholinguistics, in Nijmegen, Netherlands.

His wide-ranging research interests include the historical linguistics and linguistic typology of South America, Africa, and Melanesia.

== Selected works ==
- Handbook of Descriptive Language Knowledge: A Full-Scale Reference Guide for Typologists (2007)
- Unsupervised Learning of Morphology and the Languages of the World (2009)
- Linguistic Diversity and Language Evolution (2016)
- Language Isolates in the New Guinea region (2017)
- A Survey of African Languages (2018)
- An inventory of Bantu languages (2019)
