= Dumo people =

People of New Guinea

The Dumo people of New Guinea speak a dialect of the Vanimo language.

== Dumo culture ==
=== Agriculture ===
Sago is the main staple food, and the clan owns individual palms. Within the clan, trees are allocated to individual families if it was planted by an ancestor. Sago takes an average of 40 years to grow so a man plants the sago for his grandchildren. A man's status is measured by the number of plants he plants for his descendants. Food gardens are a joint responsibility where men clear the larger trees, and women clear the undergrowth. Although decision making was supposedly made by the men, the women had covert decision-making power behind the scenes over many gardening decisions. Most of the planting is done by the women, who collect seeds from other women, although men can collect and plant a garden. Traditionally, pigs were raised by the women although traditionally owned by the men.

=== Economy ===
The Dumo culture has its own currency called the Deh and Hu-o. The Deh has the form of green jade beads stored on a string, in which they have a base 8 counting system for payments. One could give one Deh to someone who provides a fish or sago meal. If my brother gives a lot of fish, and I get a basket of sago too, I would recompense with 8 Deh. There is a lot of superstition about how the Deh came about. For example, there is a legend that Deh fell as seeds from a tree that fell into Lake Sentani, in West Papua, and changed into Jade Beads. There are also other legends about how they came about. The most recent findings are that they were made in Asia, somewhere in Borneo, Brunei, Pakistan, or India. They are not just normal beads; local people are very discriminating as to which are the genuine article. Different types of Deh have different prices – so that green ones have a value of about 5 Kina, the blue have a greater value. The light blue is very rare, dark blue is the most expensive. Brown, white, and transparent varieties have intermediate value. The dark blue Deh has a value of about 20 Kina.

Ho-u is made of the same Green Jade; some are white or brown, or clear glass. It currently has a value of about 500K for one. Each Hu-o is circular with a diameter of about 4 inches (10 centimetres) and they are about ½ an inch thick, with a central hole about 3-4 centimetres in diameter.

Hu-o are usually used for brideprice and death ceremonies. For example, when a member of a clan dies. A woman and her male sons are the property of her brothers and the clan. At her death, the Hu-o goes to her immediate clan brother, and 24 Deh are paid to other male clan members. To attend a celebratory feast, a woman must pay 24 Deh plus a minimum of 100 Kina to the brothers and other male Clan members who have organized the feast.

The Deh and Hu-o are believed to have come from somewhere in the west. They came with migration. Women wear a belt with beads set in a distinctive pattern that tells members where they come from, for example, a Papua New Guinea woman may wear beads that inform others that she came from Skuo, just across the West Papuan Border. The Deh of poorer quality are used for decoration, where the pattern of decoration tells others which clan you are from.

=== Social structure ===
The female members of the clan are highly valued members of the community, who must have exogamous marriages into other clans in order to bring more Deh into the clan. A man with many sisters is considered to be lucky. There are four payments for each couple; the first is the engagement price which varies in value. A second payment is the bride price, that contains several payments; paying first for her head (to signify the work she does carrying a bilum, here called the "limbum" and breasts and her navel (or "wuto", to signify extension of her husband's clan through her children that she carries in the womb). The third payment is when she dies, which is the payment for the eyes or "hlou payment, for when she closes her eyes for the last time. The final payment is for each male child she produces, which is called the "wahun", literally meaning "a human seedling". The male child is owned by her clan even though he belongs to her husband’s clan. A payment must be made to her clan for each of them when they die. Female children belong to their husband’s clan, and bride price is paid to their husband’s clan.

=== Political structure ===
Dumo society had a chieftain ("Wateh") structure, associated with "big men" and "warriors". Warriors often acquire and obtain larger holdings. Decisions are traditionally made by the men in the "men's houses" or haus tamboran (spirit houses) which were the biggest built structures of the clan. Women lived in a "family house" with their children. Many of the tamboran houses were destroyed during the days of the German administration. The German administration also established a "luluai" and "tultul" system which has now been restructured as a ward system of local government.

=== Spiritual life ===
The Dumo people believed traditionally in two worlds: one is the world of the living, the second is the world of the dead. The living have a duty to maintain peace with the spirits of the ancestors who have departed. If they performed acts that were not acceptable to the living it would also be unacceptable to the dead. The living would know through dreams or visions that the dead were unhappy. In such cases sickness of children was seen as the spirits were unhappy. The long illnesses and death of a child was often seen as a result of parental stubbornness, and the spirits as a result would need to be appeased.The Dumo believed that the spirits of the ancestors did not depart but remained in close proximity helping and keeping an eye upon the living. Dreams play a significant role in the Dumo culture in foretelling events that are about to happen or in providing a message from the spirits of the dead to the living prescribing specific actions. Some people were believed to be more accurate dreamers than others, and they are able to confront others with a pointed message that is necessary to restore the victim of others to health. Today, about 80% of the coastal people of the Dumo culture would be Catholic. The first missionaries arrived in the Vanimo district in 1939. Since 1939, each village has a community cemetery, whereas previously they would be interred near the family houses. Previously, the number of Catholics was almost 100% but the number has declined due to the arrival of American Pentecostal and evangelical missionaries.
