= Uni language =

Skou language of Papua New Guinea

Uni
- Ramo
- Region: Sandaun Province, Papua New Guinea
- Native speakers: (670 cited 2000)
- Language family: Skou: Piore River; Warapu; Uni

Language codes
- ISO 639-3: uni
- Glottolog: unii1234
- Coordinates: 3.09369°S 142.027703°E

Uni (Ramo) is a Skou language of Papua New Guinea. It is spoken in Ramo village (3.09369°S 142.027703°E) of West Aitape Rural LLG, Sandaun Province, located near the border with Indonesia.
