= Hoia Hoia language =

Papuan language of Papua New Guinea

Hoia Hoia
- Ukusi-Koparami
- Native to: Papua New Guinea
- Region: Western Province
- Native speakers: (80 cited 2000)
- Language family: Trans–New Guinea: Fly River (Anim); Inland Gulf; Minanibai; Hoia Hoia–Hoyahoya; Hoia Hoia

Language codes
- ISO 639-3: hhi
- Glottolog: hoia1236

Hoia Hoia (Ukusi-Koparami) is a Papuan language of Papua New Guinea. It is close to Minanibai (Foia Foia) and Hoyahoya. It is spoken in Ukusi-Koparamio village (7.812986°S 143.682495°E; 7.830844°S 143.740897°E) of Bamu Rural LLG in Western Province, Papua New Guinea. It shares its name with the closely related Hoyahoya language. The only documentation of Hoia Hoia is a wordlist in Carr (1991).
