= Hoyahoya language =

Anim language of Papua New Guinea

Hoyahoya
- Matakaia
- Native to: Papua New Guinea
- Region: Western Province
- Native speakers: (95 cited 2000)
- Language family: Trans–New Guinea: Fly River (Anim); Inland Gulf; Minanibai; Hoia Hoia–Hoyahoya; Hoyahoya

Language codes
- ISO 639-3: hhy
- Glottolog: hoya1235

Hoyahoya (Matakia) is an Anim language spoken in the village of Matakaia (7.845775°S 143.246807°E) of Bamu Rural LLG in Western Province, Papua New Guinea. It shares its name with the closely related Hoia Hoia language. It is documented solely in an unpublished wordlist by Carr (1991).

== See also ==
- Hoia Hoia language
