= Bauni language =

Skou language spoken in Papua New Guinea

Bauni
- Warapu, Barupu
- Region: Sandaun Province, Papua New Guinea
- Native speakers: (300 cited 2000)
- Language family: Skou: Piore River; Warapu; Bauni

Language codes
- ISO 639-3: bpe
- Glottolog: wara1302
- ELP: Warapu (shared)
- Coordinates: 3.071595°S 142.057463°E

Bauni is a language spoken in Barupu (Warapu) village (3.071595°S 142.057463°E) of West Aitape Rural LLG, Sandaun Province, Papua New Guinea.

The alternative name Barupu or Warapu, from the name of the Bauni village, has been applied to related languages as well, and 'Warapu' may be retained as a cover term.

== Phonology ==
Bauni has 9 consonants and 6 vowels.

Bauni consonants
	Bilabial	Alveolar	Palatal	Velar	Labial-velar
Plosive	p b	t		k	
Nasal	m	n			
Trill		r			
Approximant			j		w

Consonants may undergo lenition, fortition, palatalization, or assimilation to produce a larger number of surface phonemes.

Bauni vowels
	Front	Central	Back
Close	i		u
Close-mid	e		o
Open-mid			ɔ
Open		a	

Words belong to one of five tone classes: H, L, LH, HL, HLH.

Syllables have the following form: (C)(G)V(G)(N), where (G) represents a glide and (N) represents a nasal. There are no syllables that have the maximum possible form of CGVGN.

== Morphology ==
Verbs belong to one of four classes that differ in terms of what morphology may be applied and how. Verbs are obligatorily marked for mood - either realis (/k-/) or irrealis (/n-/) - and for subject. Certain classes of verbs require objects to be marked as well.

k-opu-jara-ni
REAL-2PL.M-see-1SG.F
You see me.

== Lexicon ==
Bauni free pronouns are distinguished on the basis of person, gender, and number.

		singular	dual	plural
1st	M	něná	měpí	měmí
1st	F	nění	měpí	měmí
2nd	M	měmá	mǒpú / běvé	
2nd	F	mǒmú	mǒpú / běvé	
3rd	M	yá	yéi / rěré	
3rd	F	bó	yéi / rěré	

== Syntax ==
Clauses in Bauni employ Agent-Patient-Verb word order. Recipients, instruments, and other oblique noun phrases typically follow the verb.

Kuáni k-o-kôe
mother REAL-3SG.F-go.up
Mother went up.

Kuáni aka k-o-yarâ-ká
mother father REAL-3SG.F-see-3SG.M
Mother saw father.

Cha Meniri bá=va k-a-r-o-a nâkí
Cha Meniri fish=PRM REAL-3SG.M-3SG.M-give-3SG.M dog
Cha Meniri gave the dog-spirit a fish.
