= Palmai Rural LLG =

Local-level government in Papua New Guinea

- Location within Papua New Guinea
- Coordinates: 3.552751°S 142.423936°E
- Country: Papua New Guinea
- Province: Sandaun Province
- Time zone: UTC+10 (AEST)

Palmai Rural LLG is a local-level government (LLG) of Sandaun Province, Papua New Guinea.

== Wards ==
- 01. Kuvalvu
- 02. Monandin
- 03. Nangen
- 04. Yadagaro
- 05. Sundun
- 06. Kolembi
- 07. Sumambum
- 08. Asier
- 09. Binare
- 10. Boini
- 11. Wara
- 12. Muku
- 13. Yeresi
- 14. Sabig
- 15. Mai
- 19. Yambil
- 20. Sengi
- 21. Yolpa
- 22. Munumbal
