= Yangkok Rural LLG =

Local-level government in Papua New Guinea

- Location within Papua New Guinea
- Coordinates: 3.562232°S 142.217826°E
- Country: Papua New Guinea
- Province: Sandaun Province
- Time zone: UTC+10 (AEST)

Yangkok Rural LLG is a local-level government (LLG) of Sandaun Province, Papua New Guinea. Various Torricelli languages are spoken in the LLG.

== Wards ==
- 01. Ausin/Yumoun
- 02. Mupun/Sikel
- 03. Weikint/Nunsi
- 04. Yuwil/Yemlu
- 05. Laingim/Soloku
- 06. Wulukum
- 07. Piom/Lalwi
- 08. Bimon/Maibel
- 09. Yili/Tomoum
- 10. Pinkil/Bairap
- 11. Warin/Witaili
- 12. Puang/Witikin
- 13. Weis/Witwan
- 14. Tomontonik/Yemnu
- 15. Anguganak
- 16. Rawot
- 17. Maimbel
- 18. Brugap/Bogasip
- 19. Yangkok
- 21. Mushu/Wublakil
- 22. Ningil 1
- 23. Ningil 2
