= Skou language =

Skou language spoken in Indonesia

Skou
- Tumawo
- Native to: Indonesia
- Region: Muara Tami District, Jayapura City
- Native speakers: (700 cited 1999)
- Language family: Skou: Western; Skou

Language codes
- ISO 639-3: skv
- Glottolog: nucl1634
- ELP: Skou

Skou (Sekol, Sekou, Sko, Skouw, Skow, Sukou), or Tumawo (Te Mawo), is a Papuan language of Indonesia.

== Distribution ==
Skou is spoken in three villages of Muara Tami District, Jayapura City. The villages are:

- Skou Yambe (Skou name: Te Tángpe), the westernmost and most populous Skou village
- Skou Mabo (Skou name: Te Máwo), located between Skou Yambe and Skou Sae villages
- Skou Sae (Skou name: Te Bapúbi), the easternmost and least populous Skou village

== Phonology ==
=== Consonants ===
The Skou consonants are:

		Labial	Alveolar	Palatal/ Velar	Glottal
Nasal		m	n		
Plosive	voiceless	p	t	k	
Plosive	voiced	b		ɟ~ɡʲ	
Fricative		f			h
Approximant		w	l	j	
Vibrant			r		

=== Vowels ===
Vowels can be nasalized, except for /ɨ/ and /u/.

	Front		Central		Back	
	oral	nasal	oral	nasal	oral	nasal
Close	i	ĩ	ɨ		u	
Mid	e	ẽ	ə	ə̃	o	õ
Open	a	ã				

=== Tone ===
Skou contrasts three different tones in monosyllables: high, low and falling, which can be combined with nasality for a six-way contrast.

Pitch	Oral	Nasal
high [˥]	ta 'grass'	tã 'bird'
low [˨]	ta 'hair'	tã 'canoe'
falling [˥˩]	ta 'arrow'	tã 'machete'

Tone in Skou is affiliated with each word, rather than with each syllable. In addition to lexical differences in tone, tone has grammatical functions. For instance, tense is differentiated by tone:

non-past tense forms
[ni hu] falling-falling 'I sew'	[ni ha] falling-high 'I stand'	[ni hũ] falling-low 'I drink'
past tense forms
[ni hu] falling-low 'I sewed'	[ni ha] falling-low 'I stood'	[ni hũ] falling-low 'I drank'

== Pronouns ==
Skou differentiates three types of pronouns: free pronouns, genitive pronouns and dative pronouns.

Pronouns
	Free	Genitive	Dative
1SG	[ni˥˩]	[ni˥˩]	[nɛ˨]
1PL	[nɛ˨]	[nɛ˥˩]	[nɛ˨]
2SG	[mɛ˥˩]	[mɛ˥˩]	[mɛ˨]
2PL	[ɛ˨]	[ɛ˥˩]	[ɛ˨]
3SG.NF	[kɛ˨]	[kɛ˥]	[kɛ˨]
3SG.F	[pɛ˨]	[pɛ˥˩]	[pɛ˨]
3PL	[tɛ˨]	[tɛ˥˩]	[tɛ˨]
