= Nouri language (Papuan) =

Skou language of Papua New Guinea

Bobe
- Nori, Nouri
- Region: Sandaun Province, Papua New Guinea
- Language family: Skou: Piore River; Bobe

Language codes
- ISO 639-3: None (mis)
- Glottolog: nori1242

Bobe (Nori, Nouri) is a Skou language of Papua New Guinea. Genealogically close to Barupu, it has been strongly influenced by Womo.
