= Karami language =

Extinct unclassified Papuan language

Karami
- Native to: Papua New Guinea
- Region: Kikimairi and Aduahai villages, Western Province
- Extinct: 1950s
- Language family: unclassified

Language codes
- ISO 639-3: xar
- Glottolog: kara1497

Karami is an extinct and unclassified Papuan language of southern Papua New Guinea. It is attested from only a short word list, which include many loans from Foia Foia.

== Geographical distribution ==
According to Flint (1919: 96), from which the only existing word list of Karami is available, Karami was spoken in the villages of Kikimairi and Aduahai, both located near Daru Station, "on the right-hand side (in the bush) of left branch of the Turama River, Western Division, Papua."

== Classification ==
Although Franklin (1968; 1973: 269-273) classifies Karami as an Inland Gulf language, Usher and Suter (2015: 125) do not consider it to be part of the Anim languages, noting that there are many loanwords from Foia Foia.

Pawley and Hammarström (2018) treat Karami as a 'language isolate', though this is the wording used for languages that are not easily classified.

== Vocabulary ==
Below is the word list of Karami from Flint (1919), which was recorded on October 12, 1917.

gloss	Karami
sun	aimea
moon	kuwiri
star	bube
wind	urama
rain	darepu
night	duruki
land	borti
stone	agabu
hill	darai
water	auwo
river	dupa
fire	mavio
woman	kipa
man	sor
child	kikiwea
father	tore
mother	tukini
wife	kipa
friend	mabukari
chief	naramuabera
sorcerer	adura
blood	toki
bone	goni
skin	kebora
hair	epurupa
face	osomi
ear	kuse
eye	epegu
lip	magita
mouth	magetia
nose	wodi
tongue	muta
neck	dogodi
tooth	saku
arm	sibu
shoulder	binahiwe
elbow	po
finger	kimarari
thumb	tugeti
finger (1st-4th)	kimarari
hand	simai-a
leg	auni
foot	mea
belly	niro
breast	bodoro
nipple	kino
navel	dumu
pig	giromoi
dog	kso
wallaby	teberi
rat	suma
bird	kaimo
cassowary	koibo
fowl	beia
crocodile	ibirai
hornbill	kube-i
snake	wositari
fish	mini
louse	sugani
mosquito	kieono
forest	gamai-i
tree	sumari
sago	asiba
banana	imara
sugarcane	amoro
yam	kusu
sweet potato	ori
taro	orpuo
bamboo	bira
tobacco	warariga
village	kuni
house	ogota
path	ige
canoe	gipainoe
paddle	sitara
bow	tiri
arrow	bira
shield	siwi
no	wote
two	kipainoe
one	botie
three	kipai-ia
four	mosokoto
five	tuporo
seven	diri
eight	ma
nine	ta-o
ten	taura
twenty	magagai
I	torgue
thou	kuria
