= Kwale language =

Kwalean language of Papua New Guinea

Uare
- Kwale
- Region: Rigo Inland Rural LLG, Central Province, Papua New Guinea
- Native speakers: 1,300 (2004)
- Language family: Trans–New Guinea: Kwalean; Humene–Uare; Uare

Language codes
- ISO 639-3: ksj
- Glottolog: uare1241

Uare, or Kwale, is a language of Papua New Guinea. Dialects are Garihe (Garia) and Uare proper (Kwale, Kware). It is spoken in Rigo Inland Rural LLG, Central Province, Papua New Guinea.

== Phonology ==
Consonants
	Labial	Alveolar	Velar	Glottal
Plosive	ˀb	tʰ ˀd	kʰ ˀg	ʔ
Fricative	f v	ɕ ʑ	ɣ	h
Nasal	m	n		
Trill		r		

Vowels
	Front	Central	Back
High	i		u
Mid	e		o
Low		a	

- /i u/ are nasalized following /h/ and before any nasal, velar, or glottal plosive.

Additionally, the following diphthongs have been observed: /iu/, /ei/, /ai/, /oi/, /ui/, /ae/, /oe/, /ao/, /eu/, /au/, /ou/.
