= Bougainville languages =

Bougainville languages may refer to either of the following language families of Bougainville Island, Papua New Guinea.

- North Bougainville languages
- South Bougainville languages
