= Kwalean languages =

Language family in Papua New Guinea

Kwalean
- Humene–Uare
- Geographic distribution: Southeastern peninsula of Papua New Guinea: Central Province
- Linguistic classification: Trans–New Guinea: Papuan Peninsula; Owen Stanley Range; Kwalean

Language codes
- Glottolog: kwal1257

The Kwalean or Humene–Uare languages are a small family of Trans–New Guinea languages spoken in the "Bird's Tail" (southeastern peninsula) of New Guinea. They are classified within the Southeast Papuan branch of Trans–New Guinea.

The Kwalean languages are spoken in Rigo District, Central Province, Papua New Guinea.

== Languages ==
The languages are Humene, Uare (Kwale) and recently extinct Mulaha. It is not clear if Mulaha was an outlier, or as close to the others as they are to each other.

== Classification ==
Humene and Uare are quite close (70% basic vocabulary), Mulaha more distant (22% with Uare).

The Kwalean family is not accepted by Søren Wichmann (2013), who splits it into two separate groups, namely Humene–Uare and Mulaha.

== Proto-language ==
=== Phonemes ===
Usher (2020) reconstructs the consonant inventory of Humene and Uare as follows:

*m	*n			
	*t		*k	*ʔ
*b	*d		*g	
*ɸ				*h
*w	*ɾ	*j	*ɣ	

The *k is rare.

Vowels are *i *e *ɛ *a *ɔ *o *u.

=== Pronouns ===
Usher (2020) reconstructs the pronouns of Humene–Uare as:

	sg	pl
1	*ɛ	*ɛmɛ
2	*ɣa	*ja
3	*ani	*jɛ

=== Basic vocabulary ===
Some lexical reconstructions by Usher (2020) are:

gloss	Proto-Humene-Uare	Humene	Uare
hair/feather	*igu	ˈiʔu	ˈiku
eye	*ubuma	uˈbuma	uˈbuma
nose	*jajɔɾɛ	ʒaˈʒoɾe	ʒaˈʒoɾe
tooth	*ɣɔnɔnɛ	βoˈnone	ɣoˈnone
tongue	*majanɛ	maˈnane	maˈʒane
foot/leg	*ɔda	ˈoda	ˈida
blood	*ɾɔo̝	ɾoˈo	ˈɾoˈu
bone	*e̝tinɛ	eˈhine	iˈsine
skin	*ahe̝ɾe̝	aˈheɾe	aˈhiɾi
breast	*nuunɛ	nuˈune	nuˈne
louse	*nɔmɔnɛ	noˈmone	noˈmone
dog	*ɣo̝ni	βoni	ˈɣuni
pig	*aba	ˈaba	ˈaba
bird	*ne̝ni; *t[e̝]b[o̝]ɾ[e̝]	neni; teˈboɾe	ˈnini
egg	*maɣa	ˈmaβa	ˈmaɣa
man	*wajɛ	ˈβaʒe	ˈβaʒe
woman	*nɔgɔnɛ	noˈʔone	noˈɣone
sun/day	*maˈda	maˈda	maˈda
moon	*batɔ	ˈbato	ˈbato
water	*wɔu	ˈβou	ˈβou
fire/firewood	*iɾɛ	ˈiɾe	iɾe
stone	*hadi	ˈhadi	ˈhadi
path	*e̝bi	ˈebi	ˈibi
name	*ni	ni	ni
eat	*an-	an-	an-
one	*te̝bɔ	ˈtebo	ˈtiba
two	*ahɛu	aˈheu	aˈheu

== Vocabulary comparison ==
The following basic vocabulary words are from Dutton (1970) (with additional data for Uare from 1988 SIL field notes), as cited in the Trans-New Guinea database. Proto-Kwalean reconstructions are from Ross (2014).

Note that the words cited constitute translation equivalents, whether they are cognate (e.g. nuune, nune for “breast”) or not (e.g. hadi, aroba for “stone”).

gloss	Proto-Kwalean	Humene	Uare	Mulaha
head		raˈfune	vaˈdini; və'd·inɩ	yoarowai
hair	*iku(va)	iʔvuai	'iku; ˈiku	yoroba
ear		aˈbi	'tʰɛɣʌ; ˈteɣa	akuru
eye	*(u)bu(i)vi(ma)	uˈbuma	uˈbuma; u'bumə	boivi
nose	*ʒaʒore	ʒaˈʒore	ĵ ̟ʌ'ĵ ̟ɔre; ʒaˈʒore	ine
tooth	*vono(ne); *wano(ne)	voˈnone	ɣoˈnone; ɣɔ'nɔne	waina (2?)
tongue		maˈnane	maˈʒane; mə'j ̟ane	bebura
leg		goˈenva	ɔdʌ; ˈoda	koina
louse	*(n)omo(ne)	noˈmone	noˈmone; 'nɔmone	uˈmana
dog	*ɣuni	ˈaba	ˈaba; 'ɣunɩ	aba
pig	*aba	(voni) aˈva	'ap·ʌ; (ɣuni) aˈvaɣa	batuvi
bird	*teboare	(teˈbore) ˈiʔuva	'ninɩ; (nini) ˈikuɣa	iguvi
egg	*ma(va)	ˈhava	iˈsaɣa; 'maɣʌ	iakeki
blood	*ruu	roˈo	iuː; ˈruˈu	iˈaa
bone	*esi(ne)	eˈhine	ɩ'ine; iˈsine	inina
skin	*ahiri	aˈhere kokava	a'hiṟʟ; aˈhiri	iaina
breast	*n(a)u(ne)	nuˈune	'nune; nuˈne	kobaiba
tree		iˈbado	ire; 'ire	
man	*vaʒe	oˈhoʒ; ˈvaʒe	ohɔj ̟e; oˈhoʒe; ˈvaʒe	
woman	*no'ɣone	noʔˈone	'lɔɣae; noˈɣone; roˈɣai	tina
sky	*adure	aˈdure	aˈdure	
sun	*mada	maˈda	'madʌ; maˈda	bauwa
moon	*bato	ˈbato	ˈbato; 'batʰɔ	vaisa
water	*vou; *wara	ˈvou	ˈvou; vu	vara
fire	*ire	ˈire	ireˈroga; ɩṟɛlokə	boareki
stone	*hadi	ˈhadi	'had·ɩ; ˈhadi	aroba
road, path			'ibɩ	
name	*ni	ni	ni; niː	waa anu
eat	*anE-	a-nE-	a-nE-; aᵘ ʔohe	inatu
one	*teba	ˈtebo	ˈtiba; 'tʰipʌ	pebogi
two	*aheu		a'heᵘ	

== Evolution ==
Kwale reflexes of proto-Trans-New Guinea (pTNG) etyma are:

- maɣa ‘egg’ < *maŋgV
- oda ‘leg’ < *k(a,o)ndok[V]
- nomone ‘louse’ < *niman
- ire ‘tree’ < *inda
