= Baimuru Rural LLG =

Local-level government in Papua New Guinea

- Location within Papua New Guinea
- Coordinates: 7.495832°S 144.826322°E
- Country: Papua New Guinea
- Province: Gulf Province
- Time zone: UTC+10 (AEST)

Baimuru Rural LLG is a local-level government (LLG) of Gulf Province, Papua New Guinea.

== Wards ==
- 01. Amipoke (Ipiko language speakers)
- 03. Karurua Station
- 04. Bekoro
- 05. Mariki
- 06. Varia
- 07. Korovake
- 08. Ara'ava
- 09. Kaiarimai
- 10. Kapuna
- 11. Kinibo
- 12. Ikinu
- 13. Akoma
- 14. Mapaio
- 15. Aikavaravi
- 16. Maipenairu
- 17. Kapai
- 18. Apiope
- 19. Aumu
- 20. Poroi
- 21. Wabo
- 22. Uraru
- 23. Haia
- 80. Baimuru Station
