= Mulaha language =

Extinct language of Papua New Guinea

Mulaha
- Region: Papua New Guinea
- Extinct: 1950s
- Language family: Trans–New Guinea: Kwalean; Mulaha

Language codes
- ISO 639-3: mfw
- Glottolog: mula1254

Mulaha is an extinct language of the "Bird's Tail" of Papua New Guinea.

== Vocabulary ==
A word list was collected by English (1902).
