= Humene language =

Language of Papua New Guinea

Humeme
- Region: Papua New Guinea: lower Sogeri plateau; plain between Gaire and Kapakapa villages in Rigo Central Rural LLG, Central Province
- Native speakers: (940 cited 2000 census)
- Language family: Trans–New Guinea: Kwalean; Humene–Uare; Humeme

Language codes
- ISO 639-3: huf
- Glottolog: hume1246

Humeme is a language of the "Bird's Tail" of Papua New Guinea. It is spoken mainly in and around the village of Manugoro (9.710548°S 147.462152°E) in Rigo Central Rural LLG, Central Province.
