= Swiss Communist Organization =

The Swiss Communist Organization (German: Schweizerische Kommunistische Organisation, SKO; French: Organisation Communiste de Suisse, OCS) was a Maoist-oriented communist organization in Switzerland. The organization was founded on December 10, 1978, through the merger of three groups:

- Workers Politics Communist Organization (Kommunistische Organisation Arbeiterpolitik, KOAP) in Zurich and Winterthur; founded in 1977 through merger of the Workers Politics Communist Group (Kommunistische Gruppe Arbeiterpolitik, KGAP, founded in 1976 by minority of Revolutionary Build-up Organization Zurich (Revolutionäre Aufbauorganisation Zürich, RAZ)) and Critical Forum Winterthur (Kritisches Forum Winterthur);
- Communist League of Basel (Kommunistischer Bund Basel);
- Red Flag Communist Organisation (Organisation Communiste Le Drapeau Rouge); founded on March 27, 1977, by Rupture for Communism (Rupture pour le Communisme, RplC) in Vaud and Geneva and Struggle Organization for Communism (Organisation de Lutte pour le Communisme) in Geneva.

Jürg Stöcklin was the chairman of the organization. The organization published Kämpfer ('Fighter') and Drapeau Rouge ('Red Flag') as its news magazines and Kommunist ('Communist') as its theoretical organ.

The organization was dissipated in the summer of 1980.
