= Inland Gulf languages =

Linguistic family

Inland Gulf
- Geographic distribution: New Guinea
- Linguistic classification: Trans–New Guinea: Anim (Fly River); Inland Gulf
- Subdivisions: Ipiko; Minanibai

Language codes
- Glottolog: inla1262
- Map: The Inland Gulf languages of New Guinea The Inland Gulf languages Other Trans–New Guinea languages Other Papuan languages Austronesian languages Uninhabited

The Inland Gulf languages are a family of Trans–New Guinea languages in the classifications of Stephen Wurm (1975) and Malcolm Ross (2005). The unity of the languages was established by K. Franklin in 1969. Although the family as a whole is clearly valid, Ipiko is quite distinct from the other languages.

== Languages ==
- Inland Gulf family
  - Ipiko language
  - Minanibai branch: Minanibai (Foia Foia), Mubami (Tao), Ukusi-Koparamio Hoia Hoia – Matakaia Hoia Hoia

Karami was once included, due to a large number of loanwords from Minanibai, but is best left unclassified for now.

Mahigi is also included by Pawley and Hammarström (2018).

== Phonemes ==
Usher (2020) reconstructs the consonant inventory as follows:

*m	*n		
*p	*t		*k
*b	*d		*g
*ɸ	*s		
*w	[*ɾ]	*j	*ɣ̃

Vowels are *a *e *i *o *u.

== Pronouns ==
The pronouns are:

	sg	pl
1	*no	*ni
2	*ɣ̃o	*jo
3m	*ete	*eti
3f	*etu	*eti

== Evolution ==
Inland Gulf reflexes of proto-Trans-New Guinea (pTNG) etyma:

- Hoia Hoia, Mubami, Ipiko de ‘tree’ < *inda
- Hoia Hoia mo’noto, Ipiko manoto ‘mouth’ < *maŋgat[a] ‘mouth, teeth’
- Mubami mo’moʔo, Hoiahoia mo’mo:ko ‘seed’ < *maŋgV
