= Binanderean–Goilalan languages =

Language family of New Guinea

Binanderean–Goilalan
- Oro – Wharton Range
- Geographic distribution: New Guinea
- Subdivisions: Binanderean; Goilalan; Purari

Language codes
- Glottolog: None

Binanderean–Goilalan is a language family of New Guinea, proposed by Timothy Usher under the name Oro – Wharton Range, that unites the Binanderean (Guhu–Oro) and Goilalan (Wharton Range) families and the Purari isolate:

- Binanderean languages
- Goilalan languages
- Purari language
