= Skou languages =

Language family of Papua New Guinea

Skou
- Sko, Vanimo Coast
- Geographic distribution: northern New Guinea coast near Vanimo
- Linguistic classification: Northwest Papuan?: Skou
- Subdivisions: I'saka; Piore River; Serra Hills; Western Skou

Language codes
- Glottolog: skoo1245

The Sko or Skou languages are a small language family spoken by about 7000 people, mainly along the Vanimo coast of Sandaun Province in Papua New Guinea, with a few being inland from this area and at least one just across the border in the Indonesian province of Papua (formerly known as Irian Jaya).

== Typology ==
=== Tone ===
Skou languages are unusual among Papuan languages for being tonal; all Skou languages possess contrastive tone. Vanimo, for example, has three tones, high, mid, low.

Example minimal sets illustrating tonal contrasts in various Skou languages:

- I’saka: ẽy^{H} ‘louse’, wey^{L} ‘butterfly’, wey^{LH} ‘house’, wey^{HL} ‘language’
- Barupu: e^{H} ‘tooth’, e^{L} ‘garden’, e^{HL} ‘mosquito’, e^{HLH} ‘write’
- Wutung: ho^{H} ‘roof thatch made from sago palm fronds’, ho^{L} ‘star’, ho^{HL} ‘grease’
- Skou: ta^{H} ‘grass’, ta^{L} ‘hair’, ta^{HL} ‘arrow’

Lakes Plain languages, spoken in a discontiguous area to the southwest, are also tonal. Because of the apparent phonological similarities and sharing of stable basic words such as ‘louse’, Foley speculates the potential likelihood of a distant relationship shared between the Skou and Lakes Plain families, but no formal proposals linking the two families have been made due to insufficient evidence. Additionally according to Foley, based on some lexical and phonological similarities, the Keuw language (currently classified as a language isolate) may also possibly share a deep relationship with the Lakes Plain languages. Like the Lakes Plain languages, Keuw also possesses constrative tone.

Lepki, Kaure, and Kembra, spoken in mountainous inland regions of the Indonesia-PNG border to the southwest of the Skou-speaking area, are also tonal.

=== Morphology ===
Skou languages can be isolating or polysynthetic.

- Isolating structure: Dumo, an Inner Skou language
- Polysynthetic structure: Barupu, a Piore River language

== Classification ==
Skou languages were first linked by G. Frederici in 1912. In 1941, K.H. Thomas expanded the family to its current extent.

The Sko family is not accepted by Søren Wichmann (2013), who splits it into two separate groups.

Donohue (2007) and Donohue and Crowther (2005) list Nouri as a mixed language having features of both the Piore River and Serra Hills subgroups.

=== Sko (Laycock 1975) ===
Laycock posited two branches, Vanimo and Krisa:

- Sko
  - Vanimo branch
    - Skou
    - Sangke (Nyao)
    - Wutung
    - Vanimo (Dumo)
  - Krisa branch
    - I’saka (Krisa)
    - Rawo
    - Puari
    - Barupu (Warapu)

=== Skou (Ross 2005) ===
However, Krisa is poorly supported and Malcolm Ross abandoned it.

- Skou
  - I’saka (Krisa)
  - Barupu (Warapu)
  - Puari
  - Rawo
  - Womo
  - Vanimo branch:
    - Skou (Tumawo)
    - Leitre
    - Sangke (Nyao)
    - Wutung
    - Vanimo (Dumo)
    - Dusur

=== Macro-Skou (Donohue 2002) ===
Mark Donohue proposed a subclassification based on areal diffusion he called Macro-Skou.

- Macro-Skou
  - Iʼsaka
  - Skou–Serra–Piore linkage
    - Piore River: Nori (strongly influenced by Womo), Barupu
    - Serra Hills
      - Puare
      - Rawo – Main Serra: Rawo, Womo
    - Skou (Vanimo) family
      - Skou
      - Eastern Skou / Vanimo
        - Leitre
        - West Coast
          - Border: Nyao, Wutung
          - Vanimo proper: Dumo, Dusur

Donohue (2004) notes that is unclear if extinct Nouri is in the Piore River or Serra Hills branch.

=== Sko (Foley 2018) ===
Foley (2018) provides the following classification.

- Sko
  - I'saka
  - Piore River
    - Barupu / Warupu (Bauni)
    - Ramo (Uni)
    - Sumo (Bouni)
  - Serra Hills
    - Puare
      - Womo
      - Waro
  - Inner Sko
    - Skou
      - Leitre
        - Dumo
        - Dusur
        - Nyao / Sangke
        - Wutung

Foley's Inner Sko corresponds to Donohue's Western Skou.

=== Miller (2017) ===
The Piore River branch was renamed Lagoon in Miller (2017). The older names of the Piore River languages were from village names; Miller has since renamed them as Bauni, Uni, Bouni, and Bobe, though it is debatable whether they are all distinct languages.

- Lagoon (also Piore River)
  - Bauni (Poo and Barapu/Warapu villages)
  - Uni (Ramo village)
  - Bouni (Sumo village)
  - Bobe (Nouri village)

=== Usher (2020) ===
Usher groups the languages as follows, with each node being a reconstructable clade, and giving the family a geographic label rather than naming it after a single language. The Eastern languages are typologically quite distinct from the Western languages and I'saka.

- Vanimo Coast
  - I'saka
  - West
    - Skou
    - Leitre
    - Dumo-Dusur (Vanimo)
    - Sangke–Wutung
      - Sangke (Nyao)
      - Wutung
  - East
    - Piore River
      - Barupu (Bauni–Uri–Bouni)
      - Nouri
    - Serra Hills
      - Puare
      - Rawo
      - Pini
        - Womo
        - Sumararu

== Pronouns ==
The pronouns Ross reconstructs for proto-Skou are,

I	*na	we	*ne
thou	*me	you	?
he	*ka	they (M)	*ke
she	*bo	they (F)	*de

The Skou languages also have a dual, with a distinction between inclusive and exclusive we, but the forms are not reconstructable for the proto-language.

Pronouns in individual Skou languages:

pronoun	I'saka	Barupu	Wutung	Skou
1SG	nana	něná	niɛ	nì
2SG	mama	měmá	mɛ	mè
3MSG	kia	yá	ʔe	ke
3FSG	umu	bó	ce	pe
1PL	numu	měmí	nɛtu	ne
2PL	yumu	mŏpú	ɛtu	e
3PL	i.e.	yéi	tɛtu	te

== Cognates ==
Sko family cognates (I'saka, Barupu, Wutung, Skou) listed by Foley (2018):

Sko family cognates
gloss	I'saka	Barupu	Wutung	Skou
‘hand’	dou	eno	noʔɛ̃	no
‘tooth’	kũ	e	ʔũ	kə̃
‘breast’	ni	to	no	no
‘woman’	bu	bom	wũawũa	pɛɨma
‘bird’	yũ	ru	tĩ	tã
‘dog’		naki	naʔi	nake
‘water’	wi	pi		pa
‘old’	tuni	tɔra		rõtoto
‘eat’	a	ou	(u)a	a

A cognate set for 'louse' in Sko languages (reconstructing roughly to *nipi in Proto-Sko) as compiled by Dryer (2022):

Language (group)	louse
Serra Hills	ni, nip, nipi
Warapu	mi
Western Sko	pi, fi, pĩ
Isaka	ẽĩ

== Vocabulary comparison ==
The following basic vocabulary words are from Voorhoeve (1971, 1975), as cited in the Trans-New Guinea database. More recent data from Marmion (2010) has been added for Wutung and from Donohue (2002) (as cited in the ASJP Database) for Skou.

The words cited constitute translation equivalents, whether they are cognate (e.g. lúrtô, rəto for “eye”) or not (e.g. hlúqbùr, kəsu for “head”).

gloss	Wutung (Marmion 2010)	Wutung (Voorhoeve 1975)	Skou (Donohue 2002)	Skou (Voorhoeve 1971, 1975)
head	hlúqbùr	kəsu.	rebi	röbe; rö́e
hair	tàng	ta	ta	ta
ear	qúrlùr		le	lö
eye	lúrtô	rəto	lu; luto	lutɔ̀
nose			ha	ha
tooth	qúng	kə	ke*	kö
leg		knaŋku		tãe
louse		hehe	fi	fi
dog	náqî	naki	nakE	nakɛ́
pig	cà	tyamu		pálɛ
bird	tîng		ta*	tåå; tãŋã
egg		kuekue	ku	tã kò
blood	hnjie	hi	hi	hi
bone	qêy	e	e	ee
skin	mà; nua	na	ro	nö re; nö rɔ̀
breast	no		no*	nɔ
tree		ri	ri; rite	ri
man	panyua	teba	kE ba	ba; keba; kébanè; teba
woman	wungawunga		3mE	pemɛ̀
sun	hlàng	hrã	ra*	rãã́
moon			kE	ke
water	câ	tya	pa	pa
fire	hie	hae	ra	ra
stone	wólòng	koŋũ	wu*	hũ; wũ
eat	sàqèngpùà (1SG)		a*	kã; pã; tã
one	ófà	ofa	ali*	alì
two	hnyûmò	hime	hi*tu*	hĩ́to

== See also ==
- Papuan languages
