= Vanimo language =

Skou language of Papua New Guinea

Vanimo
- Native to: Papua New Guinea
- Region: Sandaun Province
- Ethnicity: Dumo people, Dusur
- Native speakers: (2,700 cited 2000 census)
- Language family: Skou: Western; Vanimo
- Dialects: Dusur (Duso); Dumo (Vanimo)

Language codes
- ISO 639-3: vam
- Glottolog: vani1248
- ELP: Vanimo

Vanimo (Wanimo, Manimo) is a Skou language of Papua New Guinea which extends from Leitre to Wutung on the Papua New Guinea - Indonesian border.

== Phonology ==
The Duso dialect of Vanimo is unusual in not having any phonemic velar consonants, though it does have phonetic [ŋ].

The vowels (Dumo dialect) are,

	Front	Central	Back
Close	i		u
Close-mid	e~eɪ	ø	o
Open-mid	ɛ~æ		ɔ
Open	a		

All occur nasalized, varying phonetically between a nasal vowel and a vowel followed by consonantal [ŋ]. Nasal /u/ may be realized as a syllabic [ŋ̍].

In Dumo, there are no velar consonants apart from this [ŋ] (and also as noted below). The other consonants are,

	Bilabial	Alveolar	Palatal	Velar	Glottal
Nasal	m	n	ɲ	ŋ	
Stop	p b	t d			
Fricative	ɸ β	s			ɦ
Approximant			j~dʲ~dʒ	w	
Lateral Approximant		l			

Consonant clusters are /pl, bl, ml, ɲv, hv, hm, hn, hɲ, hj/ (hv and hm may be allophones). /ɲv/ is pronounced [ŋβ]. There are no coda consonants apart from [ŋ].

/k, ɡ, ŋ/ do occur in Dusö dialect. They correspond to /ɦ/ or zero in Dumo.

Dumo syllables may have either a 'high' or a 'long' tone. There is strict syllable timing, a 'long'-toned syllable takes the entire time allotted for a syllable, whereas with a high-tone or atonic syllable, there is a slight gap between it and the following syllable. Ross writes high tone with a grave accent, and long tone with an acute accent. A syllable with a nasal vowel / coda [ŋ] is not necessarily long, it may have any of the three tones.

== Vocabulary ==
The majority of Vanimo words contain either one, two, three, or four syllables.

=== Personal pronouns ===
The pronoun system in Vanimo accommodates its grammatical gender system. The "masculine" and "feminine" 2nd and 3rd person pronouns, along with their primary uses for referring to people, can also be used for non-animate nouns or common nouns in correspondence with their grammatical gender. An example of this would be the pronoun ébu, which can be used both to mean you (in which all three members of the group being referred to as you are female), or to mean you ( in which the group being referred to as you, is made up of three common nouns that are all grammatically female). In the table below ? is used to represent unknown or undocumented words.

	Singular	Dual	Trial	Plural
1st exc.	né	nimi	nihò	ni
1st inc.	?	nimivo	nihò	nivo
2nd (masc.)	mi	?	éhò	é/évo
2nd (fem.)	mi	?	ébu	é/évo
3rd (masc.)	hé	déhé	déhò	dé
3rd (fem.)	bé	débé	débu	dé
