= Vanimo =

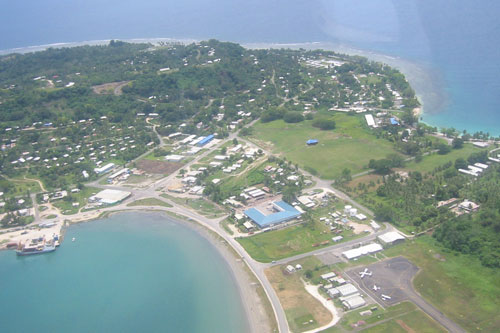
- Vanimo town from the air

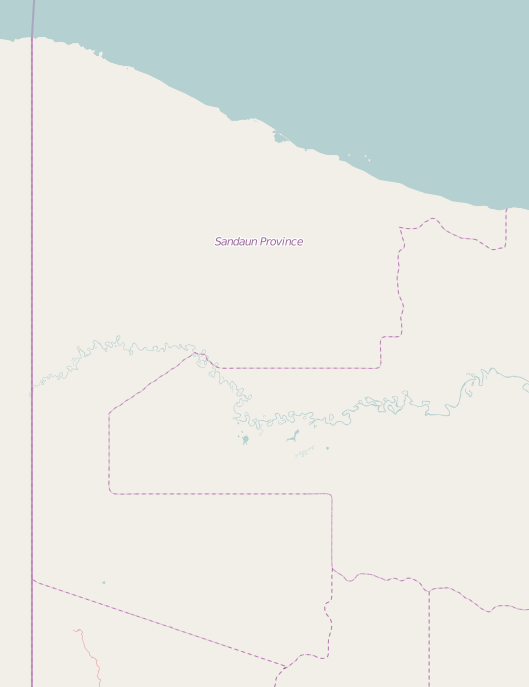
- Location within Sandaun Province Vanimo (Papua New Guinea)
- Coordinates: 2°40′S 141°17′E
- Country: Papua New Guinea
- Province: Sandaun Province (West Sepik)
- LLG: Vanimo Urban
- Elevation: 3 m (9.8 ft)

Population (2013)
  - Total: 11,863
  - Rank: 16th
- Time zone: UTC+10 (AEST)
- Mean max temp: 30.6 °C (87.1 °F)
- Mean min temp: 28.8 °C (83.8 °F)
- Annual rainfall: 2,797 mm (110.1 in)
- Climate: Af
- Location: 1,000 km (620 mi) from Port Moresby, 100 km (62 mi) from Jayapura

Vanimo is the capital of Sandaun Province (West Sepik) in north-westernmost Papua New Guinea and of Vanimo-Green River District. It is located on a peninsula close to the border with Indonesia, nearest to Jayapura, the capital city of Papua (province).

== Religion ==
Vanimo's Holy Cross Pro-Cathedral is the episcopal see of the Roman Catholic Diocese of Vanimo. Pope Francis visited the town on 8 September 2024 as part of a tour of South East Asia and Oceania.

== Economy and transportation ==
Vanimo is a small township with an economy based around the timber industry. Logging company Vanimo Forest Products, which is owned by Malaysian company Rimbunan Hijau, is the chief employer.

There is an airport in Vanimo, Vanimo Airport.

In 2026, a K3 million operational startup fund was given to begin a free trade zone project in Vanimo, aimed at establishing a trading hub based around border trade with Indonesia.

== Sports and recreation ==
Vanimo is known as a surfing destination. It has a reputation of having the most consistent waves in Papua New Guinea. Surfing season is mid October through to late April.

Vanimo also is a popular destination for foreign workers in Papua/Indonesia who need to leave the country in order to renew their visas. In this case they come over for a day to visit the Indonesian consulate, stay in one of the hotels along the "sundaun-road" and head back to the border 24 hours later.

The boardriders' club at Lido Village were the subject of a report on Australia's Dateline current affairs program.

== Climate ==
Vanimo has a tropical rainforest climate (Köppen Af). It has very warm to hot and wet weather year round. The average annual rainfall is 2,601 mm (102 in).

Climate data for Vanimo
Month	Jan	Feb	Mar	Apr	May	Jun	Jul	Aug	Sep	Oct	Nov	Dec	Year
Mean daily maximum °C (°F)	30.6 (87.1)	30.2 (86.4)	30.6 (87.1)	30.9 (87.6)	31.2 (88.2)	31.0 (87.8)	30.7 (87.3)	30.6 (87.1)	30.8 (87.4)	31.4 (88.5)	31.2 (88.2)	30.9 (87.6)	30.8 (87.5)
Daily mean °C (°F)	27.4 (81.3)	27.2 (81.0)	27.4 (81.3)	27.7 (81.9)	27.9 (82.2)	27.6 (81.7)	27.4 (81.3)	27.3 (81.1)	27.4 (81.3)	27.9 (82.2)	27.3 (81.1)	27.7 (81.9)	27.5 (81.5)
Mean daily minimum °C (°F)	24.3 (75.7)	24.3 (75.7)	24.3 (75.7)	24.5 (76.1)	24.6 (76.3)	24.3 (75.7)	24.1 (75.4)	24.0 (75.2)	24.1 (75.4)	24.4 (75.9)	24.3 (75.7)	24.5 (76.1)	24.3 (75.7)
Average rainfall mm (inches)	320.8 (12.63)	206.8 (8.14)	265.0 (10.43)	278.2 (10.95)	239.3 (9.42)	216.4 (8.52)	215.0 (8.46)	182.8 (7.20)	128.2 (5.05)	132.8 (5.23)	201.4 (7.93)	214.8 (8.46)	2,601.5 (102.42)
Average rainy days	19	21	20	18	21	16	18	15	19	17	16	20	220

== Sister cities and towns ==
- Tebedu, Sarawak, Malaysia

== See also ==
- Vanimo Coast languages
- Vanimo language
