= 1998 Papua New Guinea earthquake =

Severe earthquake and tsunami near Papua New Guinea

- Location within Papua New Guinea
- UTC time: 1998-07-17 08:49:13
- ISC event: 1167076
- USGS-ANSS: ComCat
- Local date: July 17, 1998
- Local time: 6:49 pm
- Duration: 19 seconds
- Magnitude: 7.0 M_{w}
- Depth: 30 km (19 mi)
- Epicenter: 3.11°S 142.44°E
- Type: Dip-slip
- Areas affected: Papua New Guinea
- Max. intensity: MMI VIII (Severe)
- Tsunami: 15 m (49 ft)
- Casualties: 2,183–2,700 dead Thousands injured

The 1998 Papua New Guinea earthquake occurred on July 17 with a moment magnitude of 7.0 and a maximum Mercalli intensity of VIII (Severe). The event occurred on a reverse fault near the north coast region of Papua New Guinea, 25 km (16 mi) from the coast near Aitape and caused a large submarine landslide which caused a tsunami that hit the coast, killing between at least 2,183 and 2,700 people and injuring thousands.

== Tectonic setting ==
The island of New Guinea lies within the complex zone of collision between the Australian plate and the Pacific plate. Within this overall setting, the active tectonics of northern Papua New Guinea is dominated by the effects of continuing collision between the Huon–Finisterre island arc terrane with the edge of the Australian continental margin. The overall shortening is concentrated into two zones of thrust faulting, the Ramu–Markham fault zone, which forms the southwestern boundary of the Huon–Finisterre terrane, and the Highlands Thrust Belt, which lies further southwest and deforms the Australian margin. The hanging wall of the Ramu–Markham thrust system is broken up by a series of strike-slip faults. The orientation of these faults, parallel to the direction of thrusting, suggests that they accommodate distortion of the Huon–Finisterre block. Most of the seismicity in northern Papua New Guinea is associated with the Ramu–Markham fault system, with a smaller number of earthquakes occurring on the strike-slip faults and on the Highlands Thrust Belt.

== Earthquake ==
The earthquake struck off the coast of Papua New Guinea at 18:49 local time. It measured 7.0 and 7.1 on the moment magnitude and surface-wave magnitude scales, respectively. An analysis of the aftershock distribution indicated that the mainshock occurred on a shallow-angle thrust fault dipping 19° towards the southwest. It is consistent with faulting at the boundary of the North Bismarck and Australian plates.

=== Effects ===
The earthquake consisted of a main shock and several aftershocks that were felt in several towns in the area around the epicenter. The main shock caused some minor damage to the 62-year-old church at the Sissano Mission, and was strong enough that many people in Malol, Arop, and Warapu left their houses because the shaking lasted for so long. Cracks in the ground formed in Arop and Warapu.

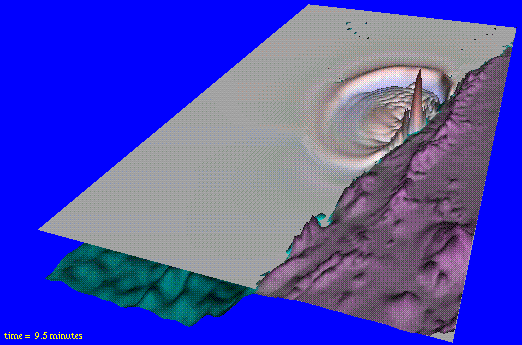
Computer modelling of the earthquake and resulting landslide

A few minutes after the earthquake, many residents reported hearing a loud clap as the tsunami approached the shoreline. The tsunami resulted in at least 2,200 people being killed, thousands being injured, about 9,500 homeless and about 500 missing. The maximum height of the waves was estimated at being 15 m (49 ft) high with an average height of 10.5 m (34 ft).

The area worst hit was a 30 km (19 mi) coastal strip running north-west from Aitape to the village of Sissano. Several villages in the path of the tsunami were completely destroyed and others extensively damaged. The tsunami wave uprooted entire buildings and transported their foundations 50–60 m (160–200 ft) from their original location The village of Arop was situated on a narrow spit between the coast and Sissano Lagoon. It was directly in the path of the tsunami and was worst hit.

=== Response ===
Immediately after the tsunami, the Royal Australian Air Force flew in three Lockheed C-130 Hercules transport planes with relief supplies. In the days following more relief was flown in and a field hospital was set up in the neighbouring town of Vanimo. The amount of injury and illness due to the tsunami overwhelmed the makeshift hospitals, leaving many victims with wounds that were untreated for several days and led to gangrene. Rotting dead bodies that remained in the lagoon spread diseases and the government sealed off the entire area. After the makeshift hospital in Vanimo was dismantled, the sick people became worse as the nearest hospital was over a day's walk away.

Several villages moved their buildings slightly further back from the sea when they eventually rebuilt. Scientists from the University of Papua New Guinea initiated a public awareness program for the residents of the coastal area affected by the tsunami, to tell them that scientific models have concluded that the geology of the surrounding area causes the destructive waves to focus their energy on that area, making it a very dangerous place to live. The scientists also recommended that the Papua New Guinea government improve the escape routes for the villages and improve the tsunami warning system. The country does not have a communications plan put in place, according to the UN Development Project's country report on Disaster Management. According to the National Research institute, there are still no roads to the villages of Arop and Warapu. Also, the Sepik highway that connects to Aitape does not connect with Vanimo.

== See also ==
- 1888 Ritter Island eruption and tsunami
- List of earthquakes in 1998
- List of earthquakes in Papua New Guinea
