= Velar consonant =

Place of articulation

Velar consonants are consonants articulated with the back part of the tongue (the dorsum) against the soft palate, the back part of the roof of the mouth (also known as the "velum").

Since the velar region of the roof of the mouth is relatively extensive and the movements of the dorsum are not very precise, velars easily undergo assimilation, shifting their articulation back or to the front depending on the quality of adjacent vowels. They often become automatically fronted, that is partly or completely palatal before a following front vowel, and retracted, that is partly or completely uvular before back vowels.

Palatalised or advanced velars (like English /k/ in keen or cube) are sometimes referred to as palatovelars. (Note: These also may be called "retracted palatal", "backed palatal", "post-palatal", "pre-velar", "fronted velar", or "front-velar".) Many languages also have labialized velars, such as [kʷ], in which the articulation is accompanied by rounding of the lips. There are also similarly named but distinct labial–velars, which are doubly articulated at the velum and at the lips, such as [k͡p]. This distinction disappears with the approximant [w], where the labialization can be interpreted as either a secondary or double articulation; as such, this ambiguous situation is often called labiovelar.

A velar trill or tap is not possible according to the International Phonetics Association: see the shaded boxes on the table of pulmonic consonants. In the velar position, the tongue has an extremely restricted ability to carry out the type of motion associated with trills or taps, and the body of the tongue has no freedom to move quickly enough to produce a velar trill or flap.

== Examples ==
Some velar consonants identified by the International Phonetic Alphabet are:

IPA	Description	Example			
IPA	Description	Language	Orthography	IPA	Meaning
ŋ̊	voiceless velar nasal	Burmese	ငှါး/nga:	[ŋ̊á]	'borrow'
ŋ	voiced velar nasal	English	ring	[ɹʷɪŋ]	'ring'
k	voiceless velar plosive	English	skip	[skɪp]	'skip'
ɡ	voiced velar plosive	English	ago	[əɡoʊ̯]	'ago'
k͜x	voiceless velar affricate	Korean	크다/keuda	[k͜xɯ̽da]	'big'
ɡ͡ɣ	voiced velar affricate	English (Note: Occasional allophone of /ɡ/ for some speakers of Scouse, RP and Cockney.)	good	[ˈɡ͡ɣʊˑd̥]	'good'
x	voiceless velar fricative	German	Bauch	[baʊx]	'abdomen'
ɣ	voiced velar fricative	Greek	γάτα	[ˈɣata]	'cat'
ɰ	voiced velar approximant	Irish	naoi	[n̪ˠɰiː]	'nine'
ʍ	voiceless labial-velar approximant	English	which (Note: In dialects that distinguish between which and witch.)	[ʍɪtʃ]	'which'
w	voiced labio-velar approximant	English	witch	[wɪtʃ]	'witch'
k͜𝼄	voiceless velar lateral affricate	Archi	лӀон/ƛon	[k͜𝼄on]	'a flock'
ɡ͡ʟ̝	voiced velar lateral affricate	Hiw	qr̄ē	[kʷg͡ʟɪ]	'dolphin'
𝼄	voiceless velar lateral fricative	Wahgi	nòⱡ	[no𝼄˩]	'water'
ʟ̝	voiced velar lateral fricative	Archi	наӏлъдут	[naˤʟ̝dut]	'blue'
ʟ	voiced velar lateral approximant	Wahgi	aʟaʟe	[aʟaʟe]	'dizzy'
ʟ̆	voiced velar lateral tap	Melpa			
kʼ	velar ejective stop	Archi	кӀан	[kʼan]	'bottom'
k͜xʼ	velar ejective affricate	Hadza	dlaggwa	[c͜𝼆ʼak͜xʷ’a]	'to cradle'
xʼ	velar ejective fricative	Tlingit	xʼáaxʼ	[xʼáːxʼ]	'apple'
k͜𝼄ʼ	velar lateral ejective affricate	Sandawe	tl’ungu	[k͜𝼄ʼùŋɡȕ]	'sky'
ɠ̊ (ƙ)	voiceless velar implosive	Uspantek	k'aam	[ɠ̊aːm]	'cord/twine'
ɠ	voiced velar implosive	Sindhi	ڳرو/g̈əro	[ɠəro]	'heavy'
ʞ	velar-released click	Wolof (paralexical)	[ʞ] (allophonic with uvular [ʞ᫢])		'yes'

== Lack of velars ==
The only languages recorded to lack phonemic velars (and any dorsal consonant at all) include Xavante, standard Tahitian (though /tVt/ is pronounced [kVt], a pattern also found in the Niihau dialect of Hawaiian), and arguably several Skou languages (Wutung, the Dumo dialect of Vanimo, and Bobe), which have a coda [ŋ] that has been analyzed as the realization of nasal vowels. No velar consonants have been found in data for Omurano, a language isolate of Peru. In Pirahã, men lack the only velar consonant.

Other languages lack simple velars. An areal feature of the indigenous languages of the Americas of the coastal regions of the Pacific Northwest is that historical *k was palatalized. When such sounds remained stops, they were transcribed ⟨kʸ⟩ in Americanist phonetic notation, presumably corresponding to IPA ⟨c⟩, but in others, such as the Saanich dialect of Coastal Salish, Salish-Spokane-Kalispel, and Chemakum, *k went further and affricated to [tʃ]. Likewise, historical *k’ has become [tʃʼ] and historical *x has become [ʃ]; there was no *g or *ŋ. In the Northwest Caucasian languages, historical *[k] has also become palatalized, becoming /kʲ/ in Ubykh and /tʃ/ in most Circassian varieties. In both regions the languages retain a labialized velar series (e.g. [kʷ], [kʼʷ], [gʷ], [xʷ], [w] in the North Caucasus) as well as uvular consonants. In the languages of those families that retain plain velars, both the plain and labialized velars are pre-velar, perhaps to make them more distinct from the uvulars which may be post-velar. Prevelar consonants are susceptible to palatalization. A similar system, contrasting *kʲ with *kʷ and leaving *k marginal at best, is reconstructed for Proto-Indo-European, assuming *kʲ is reconstructed as a prevelar (as in the traditional reconstruction).

Apart from the voiceless plosive [k], no other velar consonant is particularly common, even the [w] and [ŋ] that occur in English. There can be no phoneme /ɡ/ in a language that lacks voiced stops, like Mandarin Chinese, (Note: What is written g in pinyin is /k/, though that sound does have an allophone [ɡ] in atonic syllables.) but it is sporadically missing elsewhere. Of the languages surveyed in the World Atlas of Language Structures, about 10% of languages that otherwise have /p b t d k/ are missing /ɡ/.

Pirahã has both a [k] and a [ɡ] phonetically. However, the [k] does not behave as other consonants, and the argument has been made that it is phonemically /hi/, leaving Pirahã with only /ɡ/ as an underlyingly velar consonant.

Hawaiian does not distinguish [k] from [t]; ⟨k⟩ tends toward [k] at the beginning of utterances, [t] before [i], and is variable elsewhere, especially in the dialect of Niʻihau and Kauaʻi. Since Hawaiian has no [ŋ], and ⟨w⟩ varies between [w] and [v], it is not clearly meaningful to say that Hawaiian has phonemic velar consonants.

Several Khoisan languages have limited numbers or distributions of pulmonic velar consonants. (Their click consonants are articulated in the uvular or possibly velar region, but that occlusion is part of the airstream mechanism rather than the place of articulation of the consonant.) Khoekhoe, for example, does not allow velars in medial or final position, but in Juǀʼhoan velars are rare even in initial position.

== Velodorsals ==
Normal velar consonants are dorso-velar: The dorsum (body) of the tongue rises to contact the velum (soft palate) of the roof of the mouth. In disordered speech there are also velo-dorsal stops, with the opposite articulation: The velum lowers to contact the tongue, which remains static. In the extensions to the IPA for disordered speech, these are transcribed by reversing the IPA letter for a velar consonant, e.g. ⟨𝼃⟩ for a voiceless velodorsal stop, (Note: The old letter for a back-released velar click, turned-k ⟨ʞ⟩, was used from 2008 to 2015.) ⟨𝼁⟩ for voiced, and ⟨𝼇⟩ for a nasal.

extIPA	HTML	Description
𝼃	k	Voiceless velodorsal plosive
𝼁	ɡ	Voiced velodorsal plosive
𝼇	ŋ	Velodorsal nasal

This convention will not work for the fricatives x and ɣ, though a downtack (⟨𝼃̞⟩, ⟨𝼁᫛⟩ ~ ⟨𝼁̞⟩) can be used to fill the gap.

== See also ==
- Velarization
- Place of articulation
- List of phonetics topics

== Notes ==
Place →	Labial					Coronal										Dorsal					Laryngeal			
Manner ↓	Bilabial		Labiodental		Linguolabial		Dental		Alveolar		Postalveolar		Retroflex		(Alveolo-)palatal		Velar		Uvular		Pharyngeal/epiglottal		Glottal	
Nasal	m̥	m	ɱ̊	ɱ		n̼	n̪̊	n̪	n̥	n	n̠̊	n̠	ɳ̊	ɳ	ɲ̊	ɲ	ŋ̊	ŋ	ɴ̥	ɴ				
Plosive	p	b	p̪	b̪	t̼	d̼	t̪	d̪	t	d			ʈ	ɖ	c	ɟ	k	ɡ	q	ɢ	ʡ		ʔ	
Sibilant affricate							t̪s̪	d̪z̪	ts	dz	t̠ʃ	d̠ʒ	tʂ	dʐ	tɕ	dʑ								
Non-sibilant affricate	pɸ	bβ	p̪f	b̪v			t̪θ	d̪ð	tɹ̝̊	dɹ̝	t̠ɹ̠̊˔	d̠ɹ̠˔			cç	ɟʝ	kx	ɡɣ	qχ	ɢʁ	ʡʜ	ʡʢ	ʔh	
Sibilant fricative							s̪	z̪	s	z	ʃ	ʒ	ʂ	ʐ	ɕ	ʑ								
Non-sibilant fricative	ɸ	β	f	v	θ̼	ð̼	θ	ð	θ̠	ð̠	ɹ̠̊˔	ɹ̠˔	ɻ̊˔	ɻ˔	ç	ʝ	x	ɣ	χ	ʁ	ħ	ʕ	h	ɦ
Approximant		β̞		ʋ				ð̞		ɹ		ɹ̠		ɻ		j		ɰ						˷
Tap/flap		ⱱ̟		ⱱ					ɾ̥	ɾ			ɽ̊	ɽ						ɢ̆		ʡ̮		
Trill	ʙ̥	ʙ							r̥	r		r̠	ɽ̊r̥	ɽr					ʀ̥	ʀ	ʜ	ʢ		
Lateral affricate									tɬ	dɮ			tꞎ	d𝼅	c𝼆	ɟʎ̝	k𝼄	ɡʟ̝						
Lateral fricative							ɬ̪		ɬ	ɮ			ꞎ	𝼅	𝼆	ʎ̝	𝼄	ʟ̝						
Lateral approximant								l̪	l̥	l		l̠	ɭ̊	ɭ	ʎ̥	ʎ	ʟ̥	ʟ		ʟ̠				
Lateral tap/flap									ɺ̥	ɺ			𝼈̊	𝼈		ʎ̮		ʟ̆						

		BL	LD	D	A	PA	RF	P	V	U
Implosive	Voiced	ɓ			ɗ		ᶑ	ʄ	ɠ	ʛ
Implosive	Voiceless	ɓ̥			ɗ̥		ᶑ̊	ʄ̊	ɠ̊	ʛ̥
Ejective	Stop	pʼ			tʼ		ʈʼ	cʼ	kʼ	qʼ
Ejective	Affricate		p̪fʼ	t̪θʼ	tsʼ	t̠ʃʼ	tʂʼ	tɕʼ	kxʼ	qχʼ
Ejective	Fricative	ɸʼ	fʼ	θʼ	sʼ	ʃʼ	ʂʼ	ɕʼ	xʼ	χʼ
Ejective	Lateral affricate				tɬʼ			c𝼆ʼ	k𝼄ʼ	q𝼄ʼ
Ejective	Lateral fricative				ɬʼ					
Click (top: velar; bottom: uvular)	Tenuis	kʘ qʘ		kǀ qǀ	kǃ qǃ		k𝼊 q𝼊	kǂ qǂ		
Click (top: velar; bottom: uvular)	Voiced	ɡʘ ɢʘ		ɡǀ ɢǀ	ɡǃ ɢǃ		ɡ𝼊 ɢ𝼊	ɡǂ ɢǂ		
Click (top: velar; bottom: uvular)	Nasal	ŋʘ ɴʘ		ŋǀ ɴǀ	ŋǃ ɴǃ		ŋ𝼊 ɴ𝼊	ŋǂ ɴǂ	ʞ	
Click (top: velar; bottom: uvular)	Tenuis lateral				kǁ qǁ					
Click (top: velar; bottom: uvular)	Voiced lateral				ɡǁ ɢǁ					
Click (top: velar; bottom: uvular)	Nasal lateral				ŋǁ ɴǁ					
