= Bewani/Wutung Onei Rural LLG =

Local-level government in Papua New Guinea

- Location within Papua New Guinea
- Coordinates: 3.023119°S 141.167741°E
- Country: Papua New Guinea
- Province: Sandaun Province
- Time zone: UTC+10 (AEST)

Bewani/Wutung/Onei Rural LLG is a local-level government (LLG) of Sandaun Province, Papua New Guinea. Bewani languages and Skou languages are spoken in the LLG.

== Wards ==
- 01. Wutung
- 02. Musu
- 03. Yaukono
- 04. Yako
- 05. Waromo
- 06. Lido
- 07. Ningra
- 08. Rawo
- 09. Poko
- 10. Nowake
- 11. Laitre
- 12. Puari
- 13. Onei
- 14. Osol
- 15. Krisa
- 16. Ossima
- 17. Kilipau
- 18. Ilup
- 19. Amoi
- 20. Somboi
- 21. Ituly
- 22. Skotiaho
- 23. Ainbai
- 24. Sumumini
- 25. Imbio 2
- 26. Imbrinis
- 27. Imbrinis
