= Sandaun Province =

Province in Papua New Guinea

Sandaun Province Sandaun Provins (Tok Pisin)
- West Sepik Province
- Flag

- Sandaun Province in Papua New Guinea
- Coordinates: 3°40′S 141°30′E
- Country: Papua New Guinea
- Region: Momase
- Capital: Vanimo
- Districts: List: Aitape-Lumi District; Telefomin District; Nuku District; Vanimo-Green River District

Government
  - Governor: Tony Wouwou (2018-Present)

Area
  - Total: 35,820 km^{2} (13,830 sq mi)

Population (2024 census)
  - Total: 362,721
  - Density: 10.13/km^{2} (26.23/sq mi)
- Time zone: UTC+10 (AEST)
- HDI (2018): 0.518 low · 17th of 22

Sandaun Province (formerly West Sepik Province) is the northwesternmost mainland province of Papua New Guinea (also known as home of the sunset). It covers an area of 35,920 km^{2} (13,870 sq mi) and has a population of 248,411 (2011 census). The capital is Vanimo. In July 1998 the area surrounding the town of Aitape was hit by an enormous tsunami caused by a Magnitude 7.0 earthquake which killed over 2,000 people. The five villages along the west coast of Vanimo towards the International Border are namely; Lido, Waromo, Yako, Musu and Wutung. It borders Indonesia.

== Name ==
Sandaun is a Tok Pisin word derived from English "sun down," since the province is located in the west of the country, where the sun sets. The province was formerly named West Sepik Province, for the Sepik River that flows through the province and forms part of the province's southern border.

== Physical geography ==
The Sandaun Province has beaches along the northern coast, as well as mountainous areas throughout the province, primarily in the southern area of the province. Several rivers flow throughout the province, most notable the Sepik River. The area, like much of Papua New Guinea, is prone to earthquakes, tsunamis, and volcanic eruptions.

== Districts and LLGs ==
There are four districts in the province. Each district has one or more Local Level Government (LLG) areas. For census purposes, the LLG areas are subdivided into wards and those into census units.

| District | District Capital | LLG Name |
|---|---|---|
| Aitape-Lumi District | Aitape | East Aitape Rural |
| Aitape-Lumi District | Aitape | East Wapei Rural |
| Aitape-Lumi District | Aitape | West Aitape Rural |
| Aitape-Lumi District | Aitape | West Wapei Rural |
| Nuku District | Nuku | Mawase Rural (Nuku) |
| Nuku District | Nuku | Palmai Rural |
| Nuku District | Nuku | Yangkok Rural |
| Nuku District | Nuku | Maimai Wanwan Rural |
| Telefomin District | Telefomin | Namea Rural |
| Telefomin District | Telefomin | Oksapmin Rural |
| Telefomin District | Telefomin | Telefomin Rural |
| Telefomin District | Telefomin | Yapsie Rural |
| Vanimo-Green River District | Vanimo | Amanab Rural |
| Vanimo-Green River District | Vanimo | Bewani-Wutung-Onei Rural |
| Vanimo-Green River District | Vanimo | Green River Rural |
| Vanimo-Green River District | Vanimo | Vanimo Urban |
| Vanimo-Green River District | Vanimo | Walsa Rural |

== Provincial leaders ==
The province was governed by a decentralised provincial administration, headed by a Premier, from 1978 to 1995. Following reforms taking effect that year, the national government reassumed some powers, and the role of Premier was replaced by a position of Governor, to be held by the winner of the province-wide seat in the National Parliament of Papua New Guinea.

=== Premiers (1978–1995) ===
| Premier | Term |
|---|---|
| Jacob Talis | 1978–1980 |
| Adam Amod | 1980–1982 |
| Andrew Komboni | 1982–1984 |
| Paul Langro | 1984–1987 |
| provincial government suspended | 1987–1988 |
| Egbert Yalu | 1988–1992 |
| Aloitch Peien | 1993–1995 |

=== Governors (1995–present) ===
| Governor | Term |
|---|---|
| John Tekwie | 1995–2000 |
| Robert Sakias | 2000–2002 |
| Carlos Yuni | 2002–2007 |
| Simon Solo | 2007–2012 |
| Amkat Mai | 2012–2017 |
| Tony Wouwou | 2017–present |

== Members of the National Parliament ==
The province and each district is represented by a Member of the National Parliament. There is one provincial electorate and each district is an open electorate.

| Electorate | Member |
|---|---|
| West Sepik Provincial | Tony Wouwou |
| Aitape-Lumi Open | Anderson Mise |
| Nuku Open | Joe Sungi |
| Telefomin Open | Solan Mirisim |
| Vanimo-Green River Open | Belden Namah |
