= Ijivitari District =

- Location within Papua New Guinea
- Coordinates: 9°15′S 148°34′E
- Country: Papua New Guinea
- Province: Oro Province
- Capital: Popondetta

Area
  - Total: 12,709 km^{2} (4,907 sq mi)

Population (2011 census)
  - Total: 99,762
  - Density: 7.8497/km^{2} (20.331/sq mi)
- Time zone: UTC+10 (AEST)

Ijivitari District is one of the two districts in the Oro Province (also known as Northern Province) of Papua New Guinea, with Popondetta serving as its capital. The district encompasses a diverse landscape that includes coastal areas, mountain ranges, and inland valleys. Notable geographical features include the Owen Stanley Range to the west, the Managalas Plateau, Mount Lamington, the Nelson Range to the east, and the coastal fjords of Tufi extending south to Collingwood Bay. The population was 99,762 at the 2011 census.

The soil of the Ijivitari District is volcanic, fertile, and naturally viable for organic produce in vegetable and cash crops such as cocoa, coffee, vanilla, rice, coconut and sago. In the coastal regions, palm oil is a more profitable export. Inland regions of Ijivitari have a high potential for agriculture but are isolated from services.

== Districts and LLGs ==
District map of Oro Province, featuring Ijivitari District

Each province in Papua New Guinea has one or more districts, and each district has one or more Local Level Government (LLG) areas. For census purposes, the LLG areas are subdivided into wards and those into census units.

| District | District Capital | LLG Name |
|---|---|---|
| Ijivitari District | Popondetta | Afore Rural |
| Ijivitari District | Popondetta | Oro Bay Rural |
| Ijivitari District | Popondetta | Popondetta Urban |
| Ijivitari District | Popondetta | Safia Rural |
| Ijivitari District | Popondetta | Tufi Rural (Cape Nelson) |
