= Kokoda (disambiguation) =

Kokoda is a town in Oro Province, Papua New Guinea.

Kokoda may also refer to:

- Kokoda (film), a 2006 Australian war film
- Kokoda language, a Papuan language
- Kokoda Rural LLG, a local-level government area of Papua New Guinea
- Kokoda, a Fijian dish consisting of raw fish marinated in citrus juice and coconut milk
