= Cape Sudest =

Southeastern Papua New Guinea cape

Coordinates: 8.74067°S 148.47168°E

Cape Sudest is a cape in Papua New Guinea, next to Oro Bay. Cape Sudest is a remote and rugged peninsula located in the southeastern part of Papua New Guinea. It is situated in the Ijivitari District of the Oro Province, which is one of the 22 provinces of Papua New Guinea. The Cape Sudest peninsula is surrounded by the Solomon Sea on the east and the Coral Sea on the south, and it is characterized by steep cliffs, dense rainforests, and pristine beaches.

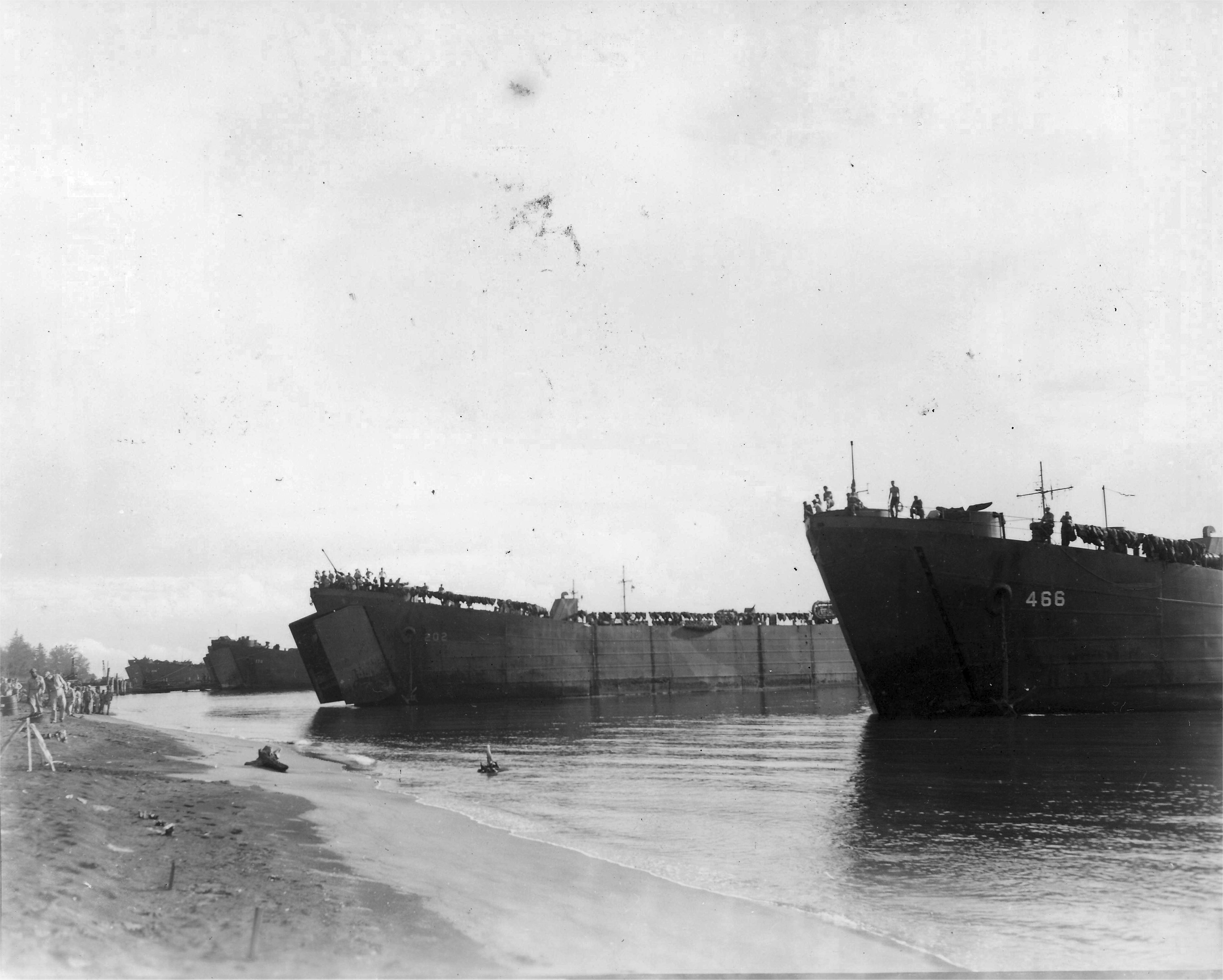
LSTs, including USS LST-466 and USS LST-202, lined up on the beach at Cape Sudest, New Guinea, awaiting loading for the Admiralty Islands action, 12 March 1944. US National Archives photo # III-SC 271517,

== History ==
The area was first explored by European navigators in the 17th century, and it was later colonized by the British in the late 19th century. During World War II, the region was a strategic location for both the Allies and the Japanese, and it saw heavy fighting during the Battle of Milne Bay in 1942.

Following the historic Battle of Buna, the United States Army constructed several roadways in the area that would provide access to the northern and southern portions of the surrounding coastline.

On December, 21, 1943 rehearsals for the upcoming invasion of Cape Gloucester were performed here under the command of Major General William H. Rupertus.

== See also ==
Oro Bay Rural LLG
