= Orokaiva =

Orokaiva may be:

- Orokaiva people
- Orokaiva language
