= Bareji language =

Bariji, or Bareji, is the name of several languages and dialects spoken near the Bariji River in the "tail" of Papua New Guinea:

- Bariji language
- Baruga language
- the Bareji dialect of the Gaina language
