= List of hospitals in Papua New Guinea =

This is a list of hospitals in Papua New Guinea.

== Hospitals ==
Papua New Guinea had a population of over seven million in 2011 with over 80 percent living in rural areas. According to the World Health Organization in 2014, there were seven regional hospitals, 19 provincial hospitals, 89 district hospitals, 677 health centre's, and 2,600 health posts in Papua New Guinea. Many rural hospitals have closed because of shortages of supplies.

Hospitals in Papua New Guinea
Rumginae District Hospital	Rumginae Station	North Fly District of Western Province	References
Alotau General Hospital	Alotau	Milne Bay Province	
Angau General Hospital		Morobe Province	
Boram Hospital	Wewak	East Sepik Province	
Daru General Hospital		Western Highlands Province	
GM Flores Hospital	Lae	Morobe Province	
Goroka Hospital	Goroka	Eastern Highlands Province	
Kapuna Hospital			
Kavieng General Hospital		New Ireland Province	
Kerema Hospital		Gulf Province	
Kimbe General Hospital	Kimbe		
Kokoda Memorial Hospital	Kokoda	Oro Province	
Kundiawa General Hospital (Sir Joseph Nombri)	Kundiawa	Chimbu Province	
Kudjip Nazarene Hospital	Kudjip		
Lae International Hospital	Lae	Morobe Province	
Laloki Psychiatric Hospital	Boroka	NCD	
Lorengau General Hospital	Lorengau	Manus Province	
Mendi General Hospital	Mendi	Southern Highlands Province	
Modilon General Hospital	Madang	Madang Province	
Mount Hagen General Hospital	Mount Hagen	Western Highlands Province	
Nazarene General Hospital	Mount Hagen	Western Highlands Province	
Nonga General Hospital	Rabaul		
Pacific International Hospital	Port Moresby		established in 1997
Paradise Private Hospital	Port Moresby		
PIH Clinic	Port Moresby		
Popondetta General Hospital	Popondetta	Oro Province	
Port Moresby General Hospital	Port Moresby		
Sohano General Hospital	Buka Bouganville		
Tari General Hospital	Tari	Hela Province	
Togoba Health Center	Mount Hagen	Western Highlands Province	
Wabag General Hospital	Wabag	Enga Province	
Yagaum Hospital	Madang (near)	Madang Province	
