= Ese language =

Baraic language spoken in Papua New Guinea

Ese
- Region: Oro Province, Papua New Guinea
- Native speakers: (10,000 cited 2000); 4,000 monolinguals (2001)
- Language family: Trans–New Guinea: Koiarian; Baraic; Ese

Language codes
- ISO 639-3: mcq
- Glottolog: esee1247

Ese is a language of Oro Province, Papua New Guinea. Although it is also known as Managalasi, which the Summer Institute of Linguistics regards as pejorative possibly because it is a corruption of Hiri Motu phrase meaning the equivalent of "know nothings", the term "Upper Managalasi" indicates Ömie, another member of Baraic languages. Dialects are Muaturaina, Chimona, Dea, Akabafa, Nami, Mesari, Averi, Afore, Minjori, Oko, Wakue, Numba, Jimuni, Karira. Perhaps 40% of speakers are monolingual.

It is spoken in the Kawawoki Mission area of Popondetta.

== Phonology ==
=== Consonants ===
		Bilabial	Alveolar	Palatal	Velar	Glottal
Stop/ Affricate	voiceless	p	t	tɕ	k	ʔ
Stop/ Affricate	voiced			dʑ		
Fricative		β	s			h
Nasal		m	n			
Tap			ɾ			

- Allophones of phonemes /β, tɕ, dʑ, ɾ/ exist as [b, ts, ɖʐ, ɺ].

=== Vowels ===
	Front	Back
High	i	u
Mid	e	o
Low	a	

- A central vowel sound [ʉ] can be heard as a result of /i/ preceding /u/.
- Allophones of /e, a, o/, exist as [ɛ ə ɔ].
- A semivowel sound [w] occurs when /u/ precedes a stressed vowel.
