= Maisin =

Maisin may be:

- Maisin people
- Maisin language
