= Upper Musa language =

Upper Musa may refer to either of two Papuan languages spoken in the "tail" of Papua New Guinea:

- Orokaiva language
- Nawaru language
