= Adventure Park Port Moresby =

Parks in Port Moresby

The Adventure Park Port Moresby Located just outside the city; the Park serves as a recreational destination. It features a variety of attractions, including a carousel, water slides, paddle boats, and other games. The park is promoted as a place to spend time with family and also includes fishing ponds.

== Park ==
The park features a natural, scenic environment. It is home to the rare bird-of-paradise and saltwater crocodiles. A wide variety of wildlife inhabits this sanctuary, which also houses a orchid garden.

== History ==
The Adventure Park Botanical Garden was established under a project initiated by Mr.Powes Parkop, the Governor of the National Capital District. This site is the ancestral land of the Koiari people, who hail from the Central Province. The traditional owners of the land are being provided with appropriate compensation.

== Crocodile attack ==
A caretaker at a park had developed a close relationship with a crocodile. On September 6, 2026 this year, the crocodile bit the caretaker. Police officers who arrived at the scene shot and killed the crocodile. The injured caretaker was rushed by St. John Ambulance to a Port Moresby General hospital three miles away for treatment; however, he could not be saved. For many years, the caretaker had engaged in various recreational activities with the crocodile, such as climbing onto its back and playing with it.

== See also ==
- Port Moresby
- Port Moresby Nature Park
- Papua New Guinea
