= Tom Dutton (linguist) =

Australian linguist (1935–2021)

- Born: Thomas Edward Dutton; 10 May 1935; Dayboro, Queensland, Australia
- Died: 21 December 2021 (aged 86)
- Occupation: Linguist
- Spouse: Corinne Dutton (m. 1962)

Academic background
- Education: University of Queensland

Academic work
- Institutions: Australian National University
- Main interests: Papuan linguistics

Thomas Edward Dutton (10 May 1935 – 21 December 2021) was an Australian linguist specialising in Papuan languages (particularly the Southeast Papuan languages) and other languages of Papua New Guinea.

== Early life ==
Thomas Edward Dutton was born on 10 May 1935 in Dayboro (near Brisbane) in Queensland, Australia. Dutton's paternal grandparents were English, his maternal grandparents were German. He the eldest of five children and had two brothers and two sisters. His father, Lewis (Ted) Dutton, was the Head Teacher of Mayfield State School. In 1936, Lewis Dutton was transferred to a rural two-teacher school in Gooburrum, located near Bundaberg, where he worked for 37 years. As a result, Dutton spent most of his childhood in Bundaberg.

== Education and career ==
In June 1957, he was Officer-in-Charge (Head Teacher) at Rigo Intermediate School, in Central District (now Central Province), Papua New Guinea, located east of Port Moresby. In 1959, he was promoted to Area Education Officer in Port Moresby Subdistrict (now the National Capital District) and was in charge of Administration and Mission Schools from Manumanu to Gaire. In 1962, he obtained his BA in English from the University of Queensland.

From 1963 to 1965, Dutton was a Research Fellow at the Queensland Speech Survey in the Department of English at the University of Queensland. While working as a researcher, he studied for a master's degree in English linguistics. He finished his PhD dissertation at the University of Queensland in 1969 and obtained a research fellowship at the Research School for Pacific Studies (RSPacS) that same year.

Dutton worked as a researcher at the Australian National University (ANU) from 1969 to 1974, where he was a specialist on Southeast Papuan languages. His research colleagues at the ANU included Donald Laycock, a specialist in languages of the Sepik region; Clemens Voorhoeve, a specialist in West Papuan languages; and Darrell Tryon, a specialist in the languages of eastern Island Melanesia.

He was Professor at the University of Papua New Guinea from 1975 to 1977 and returned to Australia afterwards.

Dutton was the managing editor of Pacific Linguistics from 1987 to 1996. He retired in 1997, but continued to publish works in linguistics. In 2010, Dutton published a book on the reconstruction of Proto-Koiarian.

He died in December, 2021, at the age of eighty-six.

== Personal life ==
In 1962, Dutton married Corinne Scott from Nanango, near Kingaroy.

== Publications ==
The following are Dutton's works published by Pacific Linguistics.

=== Books ===
- Dutton, T.E. The peopling of Central Papua: Some preliminary observations. B-9, viii + 190 pages. Pacific Linguistics, The Australian National University, 1969. doi:10.15144/PL-B9
- Dutton, T.E. A checklist of languages and present-day villages of central and south-east mainland Papua. B-24, iv + 84 pages. Pacific Linguistics, The Australian National University, 1973. doi:10.15144/PL-B24
- Dutton, T. A first dictionary of Koiari. C-122, vii + 178 pages. Pacific Linguistics, The Australian National University, 1992. doi:10.15144/PL-C122
- Dutton, T.E. Conversational New Guinea Pidgin. D-12, xvi + 310 pages. Pacific Linguistics, The Australian National University, 1973. doi:10.15144/PL-D12
- Dutton, T.E. and Voorhoeve, C.L. Beginning Hiri Motu. D-24, xviii + 276 pages. Pacific Linguistics, The Australian National University, 1974. doi:10.15144/PL-D24
- Dutton, T. Queensland Canefields English of the last nineteenth century (a record of interview with two of the last surviving Kanakas in North Queensland, 1964). D-29, xiv + 160 pages. Pacific Linguistics, The Australian National University, 1980. doi:10.15144/PL-D29
- Dutton, T. and Thomas, D. A New Course in Tok Pisin (New Guinea Pidgin). D-67, xxviii + 407 (3 maps 110 photos) pages. Pacific Linguistics, The Australian National University, 1985. doi:10.15144/PL-D67
- Dutton, T. A dictionary of Koiari, Papua New Guinea, with grammar notes. PL-534, xxvi + 424 pages. Pacific Linguistics, The Australian National University, 2003. doi:10.15144/PL-534
- Dutton, T. Reconstructing Proto Koiarian: The history of a Papuan language family. PL-610, xii + 126 pages. Pacific Linguistics, The Australian National University, 2010.

=== Edited volumes ===
- Dutton, T.E. editor. Studies in languages of Central and South-East Papua. C-29, xviii + 852 pages. Pacific Linguistics, The Australian National University, 1975. doi:10.15144/PL-C29
- Dutton, T. editor. Culture change, language change: Case studies from Melanesia. C-120, viii + 164 pages. Pacific Linguistics, The Australian National University, 1992. doi:10.15144/PL-C120
- Dutton, T., Ross, M. and Tryon, D. editors. The Language Game: Papers in memory of Donald C. Laycock. C-110, xviii + 684 pages. Pacific Linguistics, The Australian National University, 1992.

=== Articles ===
- Dutton, T. "Languages of South-East Papua". In Dutton, T., Voorhoeve, C. and Wurm, S.A. editors, Papers in New Guinea Linguistics No. 14. A-28:1-46. Pacific Linguistics, The Australian National University, 1971. doi:10.15144/PL-A28.1
- Dutton, T. "Police Motu of the Second World War: a record of interview with Nanai Gigovi, 1942". In Smith, G., Dutton, T., Voorhoeve, C.L., Schooling, S., Schooling, J., Conrad, R., Lewis, R., Wurm, S.A. and Barnum, T.) editors, Papers in New Guinea Linguistics No. 26. A-76:133-179. Pacific Linguistics, The Australian National University, 1988. doi:10.15144/PL-A76.133
- Dutton, T.E. "Notes on the Languages of the Rigo Area of the Central District of Papua". In Wurm, S.A. and Laycock, D.C. editors, Pacific linguistic studies in honour of Arthur Capell. C-13:879-984. Pacific Linguistics, The Australian National University, 1970. doi:10.15144/PL-C13.879
- Dutton, T.E. "A Koita Grammar Sketch and Vocabulary". In Dutton, T.E. editor, Studies in languages of Central and South-East Papua. C-29:281-412. Pacific Linguistics, The Australian National University, 1975. doi:10.15144/PL-C29.281
- Dutton, T.E. "South-Eastern Trans-New Guinea Phylum Languages". In Wurm, S.A. editor, New Guinea area languages and language study, Vol. 1, Papuan languages and the New Guinea linguistic scene. C-38:613-666. Pacific Linguistics, The Australian National University, 1975. doi:10.15144/PL-C38.613
- Dutton, T.E. "History of Research in Austronesian Languages: Eastern Part of South-Eastern Mainland Papua". In Wurm, S.A. editor, New Guinea area languages and language study, Vol. 2, Austronesian languages. C-39:129-140. Pacific Linguistics, The Australian National University, 1976. doi:10.15144/PL-C39.129
- Dutton, T.E. "Austronesian Languages: Eastern Part of South-Eastern Mainland Papua". In Wurm, S.A. editor, New Guinea area languages and language study, Vol. 2, Austronesian languages. C-39:321-334. Pacific Linguistics, The Australian National University, 1976. doi:10.15144/PL-C39.321
- Dutton, T.E. "Magori and Similar Languages of South-East Papua". In Wurm, S.A. editor, New Guinea area languages and language study, Vol. 2, Austronesian languages. C-39:581-636. Pacific Linguistics, The Australian National University, 1976. doi:10.15144/PL-C39.581
- Dutton, T.E. "The Distribution of Cultural Vocabulary in Papua". In Wurm, S.A. editor, New Guinea area languages and language study, Vol. 3, Language, culture, society, and the modern world. C-40:51-100. Pacific Linguistics, The Australian National University, 1977. doi:10.15144/PL-C40.51
- Dutton, T.E. "The Teaching of New Guinea Pidgin to Europeans". In Wurm, S.A. editor, New Guinea area languages and language study, Vol. 3, Language, culture, society, and the modern world. C-40:733-748. Pacific Linguistics, The Australian National University, 1977. doi:10.15144/PL-C40.733
- Dutton, T.E. and Brown, H.A. "[Hiri Motu] The Language Itself". In Wurm, S.A. editor, New Guinea area languages and language study, Vol. 3, Language, culture, society, and the modern world. C-40:759-794. Pacific Linguistics, The Australian National University, 1977. doi:10.15144/PL-C40.759
- Dutton, T.E. "The Teaching of Hiri Motu to Europeans". In Wurm, S.A. editor, New Guinea area languages and language study, Vol. 3, Language, culture, society, and the modern world. C-40:795-806. Pacific Linguistics, The Australian National University, 1977. doi:10.15144/PL-C40.795
- Dutton, T.E. "U.P.N.G.: The Hiri Motu and Tok Pisin Research Unit". In Wurm, S.A. editor, New Guinea area languages and language study, Vol. 3, Language, culture, society, and the modern world. C-40:1257-1272. Pacific Linguistics, The Australian National University, 1977. doi:10.15144/PL-C40.1257
- Dutton, T.E. "U.P.N.G.: The Linguistic Society of Papua New Guinea". In Wurm, S.A. editor, New Guinea area languages and language study, Vol. 3, Language, culture, society, and the modern world. C-40:1273-1278. Pacific Linguistics, The Australian National University, 1977. doi:10.15144/PL-C40.1273
- Dutton, T. "Tracing the Pidgin Origin of Hiri (or Police) Motu: Issues and Problems". In Wurm, S.A. and Carrington, L. editors, Second International Conference on Austronesian Linguistics: Proceedings. C-61:1351-1375. Pacific Linguistics, The Australian National University, 1978. doi:10.15144/PL-C61.1351
- Dutton, T. "Current use and expansion of Tok Pisin: teaching and Tok Pisin". In Wurm, S.A. and Mühlhäusler, P. editors, Handbook of Tok Pisin (New Guinea Pidgin). C-70:535-537. Pacific Linguistics, The Australian National University, 1985. doi:10.15144/PL-C70.535
- Dutton, T. "Borrowing in Austronesian and non-Austronesian languages of coastal south-east mainland Papua New Guinea". In Halim, A., Carrington, L. and Wurm, S.A. editors, Papers from the Third International Conference on Austronesian Linguistics, Vol. 1: Currents in Oceanic. C-74:109-177. Pacific Linguistics, The Australian National University, 1982. doi:10.15144/PL-C74.109
- Dutton, T. "Police Motu and the Second World War". In Geraghty, P., Carrington, L. and Wurm, S.A. editors, FOCAL II: Papers from the Fourth International Conference on Austronesian Linguistics. C-94:351-406. Pacific Linguistics, The Australian National University, 1986. doi:10.15144/PL-C94.351
- Dutton, T. "Successful intercourse was had with the natives": aspects of European contact methods in the Pacific". In Laycock, D.C. and Winter, W. editors, A World of language: Papers presented to Professor S.A. Wurm on his 65th birthday. C-100:153-171. Pacific Linguistics, The Australian National University, 1987.
- Dutton, T. "Dictionary-making in minor languages of the Pacific: some further problems". In Dutton, T., Ross, M. and Tryon, D. editors, The Language Game: Papers in memory of Donald C. Laycock. C-110:125-134. Pacific Linguistics, The Australian National University, 1992.
- Dutton, T. "Sago and related items in early Austronesian vocabulary". In Pawley, A.K. and Ross, M.D. editors, Austronesian Terminologies: Continuity and change. C-127:101-126. Pacific Linguistics, The Australian National University, 1994. doi:10.15144/PL-C127.101
- Dutton, T. "Lau'una: another Austronesian remnant on the south-east coast of Papua". In Lynch, J. and Pat, F.'A. editors, Oceanic Studies: Proceedings of the First International Conference on Oceanic Linguistics. C-133:61-82. Pacific Linguistics, The Australian National University, 1996. doi:10.15144/PL-C133.61

== See also ==
- Stephen Wurm
- Clemens Voorhoeve
- Darrell Tryon
- Donald Laycock
- Andrew Pawley
- Malcolm Ross (linguist)
