= Maisin people =

The Maisin are an indigenous people of Oro Province in Papua New Guinea. They have a population of around 3000 who live in villages clustered along the southwestern shores of Collingwood Bay with outliers (Uwe) on Cape Nelson. They speak the Maisin language. The Maisin traditionally live far from roads and markets; they are villagers who subsist mainly from the land and sea. A quarter or more of the population now lives in urban areas elsewhere in the country and their remittances form an essential part of the local Maisin economy.

== Culture and language ==
They make extensive use of the rainforest for swidden (slash and burn) gardens, hunting and materials for houses and canoes. Despite the 'traditional' appearance of villages, however, the Maisin have long been integrated into the larger Papua New Guinea society.

Schools, initially set up by the Anglican mission and now run by the government, have existed in the villages since 1902 and today almost all adults can communicate in at least basic English as well as Tok Pisin and the Maisin language. The Maisin are best known internationally for their exquisitely designed painted bark cloth (tapa cloth).

== Recent problems and actions ==
During the 1990s, Maisin aligned themselves with a number of environmental non governmental organizations, most notably Greenpeace, in opposition to commercial logging in the rainforests behind their villages and to foster small scale, environmentally friendly development. Their fight against a logging company, which had illegally claimed access to their lands, garnered a great deal of international attention up to 2002, when the Maisin defeated the company in a national court case. Despite this victory, the area continues to be eyed by logging and mining interests. The Maisin community is divided in their support or opposition to large scale 'development' projects in the region.

In November 2007, the Maisin villages, along with much of Oro Province were hit by devastating floods that destroyed gardens and undermined many houses.
