= Dea language =

Dea may be :

- Zimakani language
- Ese language
