= BJZ =

BJZ or bjz may refer to:

- Badajoz Airport (IATA: BJZ), an airport located in Badajoz, Spain
- Baruga language (ISO 639-3: bjz), a Papuan language spoken in Oro Province, Papua New Guinea
