= Kokoda Memorial Hospital =

Rural hospital in Oro Province, Papua New Guinea

Geography
- Location: Kokoda, Oro Province, Papua New Guinea
- Coordinates: 08°53′00″S 147°44′17″E

History
- Opened: 1995

Links
- Lists: Hospitals in Papua New Guinea

Kokoda Memorial Hospital is a hospital located in Kokoda, Oro Province, Papua New Guinea. It is located at the northern end of the Kokoda Track. In its first four and a half years of service, it served more than 100,000 patients and delivered more than 500 babies. The hospital was named for those who died in the Kokoda Campaign.

== History ==
The Kokoda Memorial Hospital was built in 1995 in a partnership between then-prime ministers Paul Keating and Julius Chan to mark the 50th anniversary of the Kokoda Campaign. Australian Aid commissioned Rotary Australia volunteers to build the $2 million AUS hospital, which consisted of 36 beds, a doctor's residence, three staff cottages, two guesthouses, washing facilities for hikers, a new war museum, and an airport shelter. Rotary Australia also did roadwork and built water pipes that connected to many houses for the first time. They were also successful in convincing Keating's government to cover costs to add an additional 10-bed ward, a solar energy system, and supplementary water pumping capacities. In 2004, only one permanent staff member was seeing 200 visitors every day.

For the 75th anniversary of the Campaign in 2005, volunteers used donated materials to build seven staff houses and one double classroom each for Kokoda Elementary School and the Kokoda Technical and Skills College. The Elementary School students had been attending classes in old hospital buildings since their establishment in 1998. In 2016, hospitals in New South Wales were donating surplus medical equipment to Kokoda, including ECG machines, linens, and uniforms. To mark the 80th anniversary of the Campaign, the hospital received K1.1 million ($467,423 AUS) worth of facility refurbishments. This included better access for disabled residents, repairs, an antenatal clinic, improved hygiene, and vaccine fridges. The Sri Sathya Sai International Organization also donated 30 beds and 30 mosquito nets.

Rotary Australia volunteers visit Kokoda annually to help update and refurbish facilities and to teach residents about family planning and using computers.
