= Tom Dutton =

Tom Dutton may refer to:

- Tom Dutton (American football) (1893–1969), American football player
- Tom Dutton (linguist) (born 1935), Australian linguist
