= Namiae language =

Koiarian language of Papua New Guinea

Namiae
- Region: Papua New Guinea
- Native speakers: 1,200 (2003)
- Language family: Trans–New Guinea: Koiarian; Baraic; Namiae

Language codes
- ISO 639-3: nvm
- Glottolog: nami1258

Namiae is a Koiarian language of Oro Province, Papua New Guinea.

It is spoken in Kokoro (9.166282°S 148.272456°E), Kuae (9.195223°S 148.260874°E), Sorefuna (9.155557°S 148.273272°E), Tahama (9.16199°S 148.295685°E), and Ubuvara (9.12344°S 148.273399°E) villages of Afore Rural LLG.

== Literature ==
A New Testament in Namiai was published in 2004.
