= Maisin language =

Language of Papua New Guinea

Maisin
- Region: Oro Province, Papua New Guinea
- Ethnicity: Maisin people
- Native speakers: (2,600 cited 2000 census)
- Language family: Austronesian: Malayo-Polynesian; Oceanic; Western; Papuan Tip; Maisin

Language codes
- ISO 639-3: mbq
- Glottolog: mais1250

Maisin (or Maisan) is a divergent Austronesian language of Papua New Guinea, containing Papuan features. It is a Nuclear Papuan Tip language, with the Papuan element being Binanderean or Dagan. It is spoken by the Maisin people of Oro Province.

Maisin displays significant lexical copying from Korafe, a neighboring Papuan language.

Other languages with disputed affiliation between either Austronesian or Papuan are Magori, the Reefs-Santa Cruz languages, the Lower Mamberamo languages, and the Pasismanua languages.

== Phonology ==
=== Vowels ===
==== Monophthongs ====
| | Front | Back |
|---|---|---|
| High | i | u |
| Mid | e | o |
| Low | a | |

==== Diphthongs ====
| | Ending with /i/ | Ending with /e/ | Ending with /a/ | Ending with /o/ | Ending with /u/ |
|---|---|---|---|---|---|
| Starting with /i/ | /ii/ | | /ia/ | | |
| Starting with /e/ | /ei/ | /ee/ | | | /eu/ |
| Starting with /a/ | /ai/ | | /aa/ | | /au/ |
| Starting with /o/ | /oi/ | | | /oo/ | /ou/ |
| Starting with /u/ | | | /ua/ | | /uu/ |

=== Consonants ===
| | | Bilabial | | Alveolar | Palatal | Velar | |
| | | Unrounded | Rounded | Alveolar | Palatal | Unrounded | Rounded |
|---|---|---|---|---|---|---|---|
| Stop | Voiceless | p | | t | | k | (kʷ) |
| Stop | Voiced | b | | d | | ɡ | |
| Nasal | | m | | n | | (ŋ) | |
| Fricative | Voiceless | ɸ | ɸʷ | s | | | |
| Fricative | Voiced | β | | | ʝ | | |
| Flap | | | | ɾ | | | |
| Approximant | | | | | j | | w |

[ŋ] and [kʷ] are not phonemic, but are distinguished in the orthography.

=== Phonotactics ===
Syllables can begin and end with up to one consonant each. I.e., English wrong /rɔŋ/ would be an acceptable word, but strength /streŋθ/ would not. Words can only end in either a vowel or [ŋ]. The vowels /u/ and /o/ never occur word-initially. /β/ never occurs before /o/ or /u/.

== Writing system ==
| A a | B b | D d | E e | F f | Fw fw | G g | I i | J j | K k | M m |
|---|---|---|---|---|---|---|---|---|---|---|
| /a/ | /b/ | /d/ | /e/ | /ɸ/ | /ɸʷ/ | /ɡ/ | /i/ | /ʝ/ | /k/ | /m/ |
| N n | O o | R r | S s | T t | U u | V v | W w | Y y | Kw kw | Ŋ ŋ |
| [n] | /o/ | /ɾ/ | /s/ | /t/ | /u/ | /β/ | /w/ | /j/ | [kʷ] | [ŋ] |

Literacy varies from 20% to 80% in different areas.

== Morphosyntax ==
=== Negation ===
==== Negation in Maisin ====
Negation in Maisin is achieved predominantly by morphology. In the Marua communalect, negation is marked by isaa… -ka, while in the Sinapa communalect, negation is marked by saa… -ka. The negation marking is discontinuous.

Isaa is a morpheme located prior to the predicate of the sentence, and can be roughly glossed as 'not' in English. Morphologically, it is classified as a separate word. -ka is an enclitic that is found attached to a verb's tense- or aspect-marking enclitic. Alternatively, when there is no tense- or aspect-marking enclitic in the sentence, it attaches to the predicate's last item. Negation through isaa... -ka can be seen in the following examples.

isaa iyeeyeka
isaa i-yee-ye-ka
not he-PROG-swim-NEG
'He isn't swimming.'

In Example 1, the verb stem 'swim' takes both the progressive marker -ye (created through partial reduplication of the verb stem yee and the negative enclitic -ka, as well as the male second-person singular pronominal enclitic. The enclitic -ka attaches to the progressive marker -ye. The combination of isaa and -ka in the sentence negates the action of swimming.

bendooka isaa raatika
bendoo-ka isaa raati-ka
Bendo-TOP not small-NEG
'Bendo is very big.' (lit. 'Bendo isn't small.')

Here negation is also shown through isaa… -ka. In this case, -ka is attached directly to the end of the predicate, as there is no tense- or aspect-marking present. The first -ka in the sentence (in bendoo-ka) is not a negative marker; rather, it is a homophonous morpheme that functions as a topic marker.

bendooka isaa vareyananka
bendoo-ka isaa var-e-anan-ka
Bendo-TOP not house-LOC-FUT-NEG
'Bendo won't be in the house.'

In Example 3, -ka is found attached to the enclitic -anan, which marks future tense. Again, negation is achieved through the combination of isaa and -ka.

===== Negation with isaa only =====
In the presence of the conjunction -ate or the demonstrative -nen, the -ka enclitic is removed, leaving isaa as the sole negation marker in the sentence. This occurs because -ate and -nen are both located in the same position in a word as -ka. isaa-only negation is demonstrated in the following examples.

isaa iraarananeŋka isaa aaranaŋka
isaa i-ar-ar-anan-nen-ka isaa a-ar-anan-ka
not he-PROG-go-FUT-that-TOP not I-go-FUT-NEG
'If he doesn't go, I shan't go.'

The presence of the demonstrative morpheme -nen in the first clause of Example 4 displaces (and removes) -ka. Thus, isaa is the sole negator of the clause.

bendooka isaa ikanate arauku
bendoo-ka isaa i-kan-ate a-ra-uku
Bendo-TOP not he-eat-and I-come-descend
'Before Bendo had eaten, I arrived.' (lit. 'Bendo didn't eat and then I arrived.')

This example shows the presence of the conjunction -ate, which is attached to the end of the verb stem kan. This removes -ka and again leaves isaa as the only negation marker in the sentence.

==== Negation within Oceanic language family ====
Maisin is an Oceanic language (Eberhard, Simons, & Fennig, 2019), and its negation system is fairly typical of Oceanic languages. Oceanic languages often express negation discontinuously, with the first element located preverbally and the second postverbally – Maisin fits this pattern, as the above examples demonstrate.

Additionally, Maisin follows both the Polynesian pattern of marking negation clause-initially and the Papuan pattern of marking negation clause-finally.

==== List of abbreviations ====
- FUT = 'final' future enclitic
- LOC = locative enclitic
- NEG = negative enclitic
- PROG = progressive aspect
- TOP = topic marker enclitic

==== Notes ====
The first interlinear text example was retrieved from page 50 of Maisin: A Preliminary Sketch by Malcolm Ross. The glossing of the morphemes yee and ye as 'PG' and the verb stem 'swim' respectively means that the negative enclitic -ka is attached to ye 'swim'. This does not seem to fit the description of -ka as attaching to the tense- or aspect-marking enclitic of the predicate. The progressive marker is generated through reduplication, and so the glossing of each morpheme may be ambiguous - that is, it may not be entirely clear as to whether yee should be glossed as 'PG' or 'swim', and likewise with the morpheme ye. This may explain why the first example seems to deviate from the typical pattern of negation.

== See also ==
- Magori language, a similar case

== Sources ==
- Lynch, John; Ross, Malcolm; Crowley, Terry, eds. (2011). "Typological overview". The Oceanic languages. London: Routledge. pp. 34–53. doi:10.4324/9780203820384. ISBN 978-0-415-68155-1.
- Ray, Sidney H. (Jul–Dec 1911). "Comparative notes on Maisin and other languages of eastern Papua". Journal of the Royal Anthropological Institute. 41: 397–405. doi:10.2307/2843181. JSTOR 2843181.
- Reesink, Ger; Dunn, Michael (2017). "Contact phenomena in Austronesian and Papuan languages". The Languages and Linguistics of the New Guinea Area. pp. 939–985. doi:10.1515/9783110295252-009. ISBN 978-3-11-029525-2.
- Ross, Malcolm (1984). "Maisin: A preliminary sketch". In Ross, Malcolm; Siegel, Jeff; Blust, Robert; Colburn, Michael A.; Seiler, W. (eds.). Papers in New Guinea Linguistics No. 23. Dept. of Linguistics, Research School of Pacific Studies, The Australian National University. pp. 1–82. doi:10.15144/PL-A69.1. hdl:1885/253498. ISBN 978-0-85883-313-5. ProQuest 1297865877.
- Strong, W. M. (Jul–Dec 1911). "The Maisin Language". Journal of the Royal Anthropological Institute. 41: 381–396. doi:10.2307/2843180. JSTOR 2843180.
