= Ewage language =

Binanderean language spoken in Papua New Guinea

Ewage
- Notu
- Native to: Papua New Guinea
- Region: Oro Province
- Native speakers: 12,000 (2015)
- Language family: Trans–New Guinea: Binanderean; Ewage
- Dialects: Ewage-Notu; Yega (Gona, Okeina, Okena)

Language codes
- ISO 639-3: nou
- Glottolog: ewag1241

Ewage, also known as Notu, is a Papuan language spoken in the "tail" of Papua New Guinea. Preference for the name depends on the region. Its two dialects are Sose/Sohe (Western Plains Orokaiva) and Ifane/Ihane (Eastern Plains Orokaiva) (Smallhorn 2011:47).

== Phonology ==
Consonants
		Labial	Alveolar	Palatal	Velar
Nasal		m	n	ɲ	
Plosive	voiceless		t		k
Plosive	voiced	b	d		ɡ
Plosive	prenasal	ᵐb	ⁿd		ᵑɡ
Affricate	voiced		dz		
Affricate	prenasal		ⁿdz		
Fricative		ɸ	s		ɣ
Rhotic			ɾ		
Approximant		w	(l)	j	

- /ᵑɡ/ can be pronounced as [ŋ] when in word-medial position.
- /w/ can be pronounced as [β] when before front vowels /i, ɛ/.
- /ɾ/ can be pronounced as [l] or [ɾ] in free variation in all positions.

Vowels
	Front	Central	Back
High	i		u
Mid	ɛ		ɔ
Low		a	
