= Samane =

Samane may refer to:

- Samane Viyaket (1927–2016), Laotian politician
- Guhu-Samane language, Trans–New Guinea language
