= Airlines PNG Flight 4684 =

2009 aviation accident

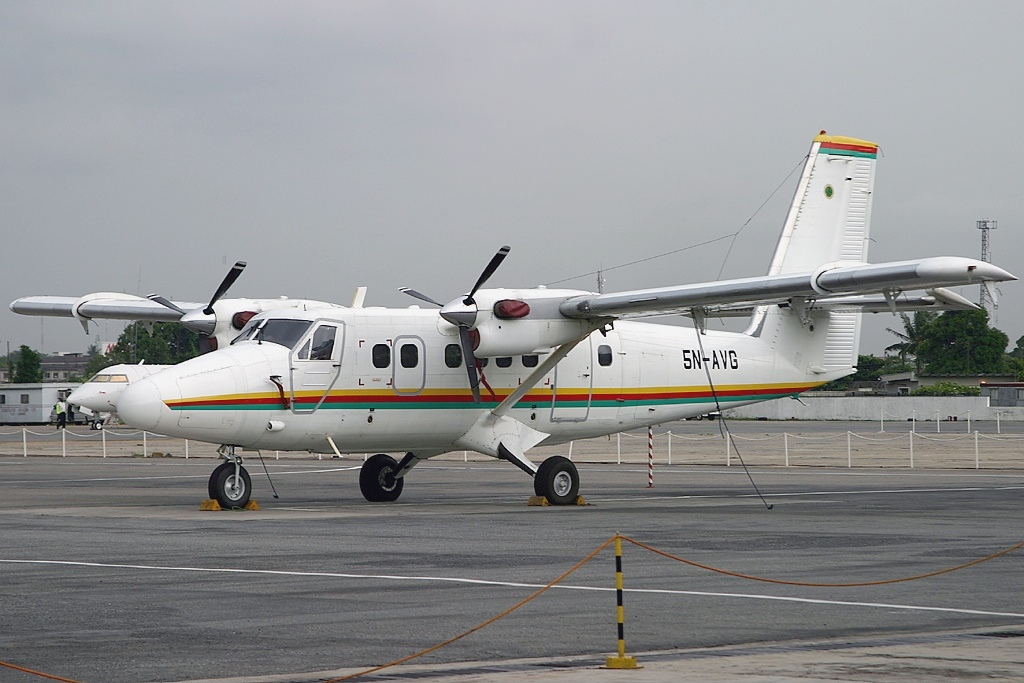
- A De Havilland Canada DHC-6-300 Twin Otter, similar type of the crashed plane

Accident
- Date: 11 August 2009
- Summary: Controlled flight into terrain due to pilot error
- Site: Isurava, Papua New Guinea; 8°53′S 147°44′E

Aircraft
- Aircraft type: Twin Otter
- Operator: Airlines PNG
- Call sign: BALUS 4684
- Registration: P2-MCB
- Flight origin: Jacksons International Airport, Port Moresby, Papua New Guinea
- Destination: Kokoda Airport, Oro Province, Papua New Guinea
- Occupants: 13
- Passengers: 11
- Crew: 2
- Fatalities: 13
- Survivors: 0

Airlines PNG Flight 4684 (CG4682/TOK4684) was a scheduled domestic passenger flight operated by Papua New Guinean Airlines PNG, flying from Jacksons International Airport in Papua New Guinea's capital Port Moresby to Kokoda Airport in Oro Province, Papua New Guinea. On 11 August 2009, the aircraft operating the flight, a de Havilland Canada Twin Otter, the aircraft impacted terrain on the eastern slope of the Kokoda Gap at about 1,760 m (5,780 ft) above mean sea level in heavily-timbered jungle about 11 km south-east of Kokoda Airstrip. The aircraft was destroyed by impact forces. There were no survivors of the 13 people on board. A search and rescue operation was conducted by authorities who found the wreckage of the plane the next day, 12 August 2009. The aircraft was severely damaged, searchers found no signs of life. Papua New Guinean Search and Rescue Agency then announced that everyone on board had died.

The Accident Investigation Commission (AIC) investigated the cause of the crash and released its final report, concluding that the aircraft crashed due to pilot error. The plane deviated from its original flight path, visual references normally used in the Kokoda Gap were obscured by clouds, the pilots were not aware of their proximity to terrain. The AIC classified the accident as controlled flight into terrain.

== Flight ==
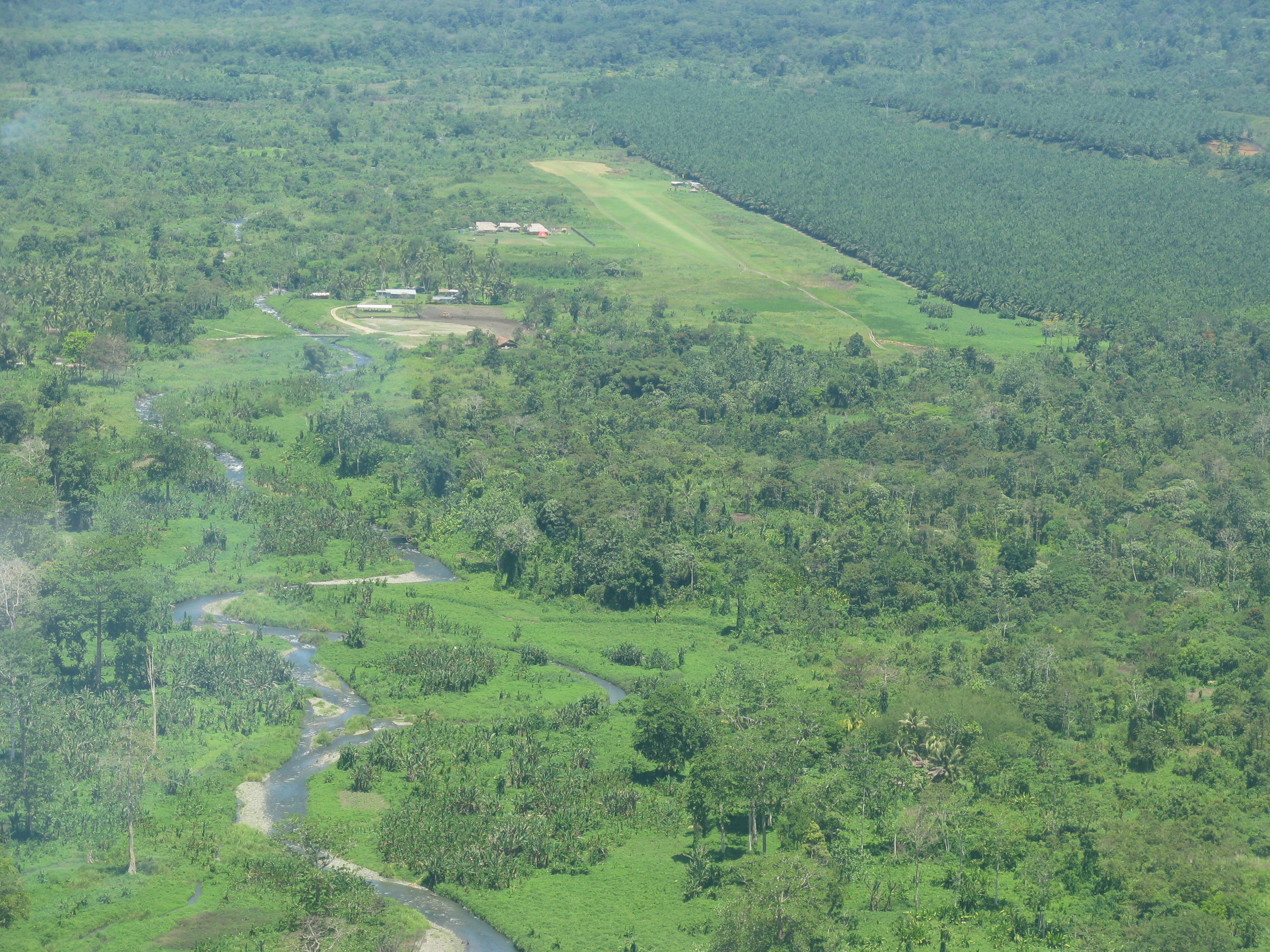
Kokoda Airstrip, the destination airport, pictured in 2008

The aircraft departed Jacksons International Airport at 10:50 am local time and reported to Jacksons Tower that they were climbing to 9,000 ft via the Kokoda Gap, with an estimated time of arrival at 11:20 am. At 11:11 am, while en route to Kokoda and on descent in the Kokoda Gap, the crew of Flight 4684 conversed with the crew of an aircraft, registered P2-KST, which was departing from Kokoda. There was no indication that the crew of Flight 4684 had any problems with their aircraft. On the ATC recording, the crew was heard saying "Thank you very much, morning long you". This was the last communication from Flight 4684.

Witnesses at Isurava village stated that they observed an aircraft fly low over the village at about the estimated time of the accident. Witnesses at the nearby Misima village stated that they heard an aircraft fly near their village but that they could not see the aircraft, as the area was covered by cloud. They stated that shortly after, there was a loud bang above the village and the sound of the aircraft stopped. Port Moresby ATC lost contact with Flight 4684.

Port Moresby ATC tried to contact Flight 4684, even requesting nearby aircraft in the area to contact the plane. However, there was no response from Flight 4684. ATC then asked other aircraft P2-MCD, an Airlines PNG plane departing from Efogi Airport, if Flight 4684 had landed in Kokoda. The crews of P2-MCD then stated that P2-MCB did not land in Kokoda. Port Moresby ATC then declared Flight 4684 status to ALERFA (alert search and rescue phase), and subsequently to DISTRESFA (distress search and rescue phase).

Search and rescue teams searched the area where Flight 4684 had lost contact, but the search and rescue operation was hampered by bad weather, low visibility and rough terrain. On 12 August 2009, a search and rescue Dornier aircraft detected an ELT signal in the search area. Later, a search and rescue team found the wreckage. The aircraft was totally destroyed. The search team did not find anyone alive at the crash site, and announced that no one survived the crash.

== Aircraft ==
The aircraft involved in the accident was a De Havilland Canada Twin Otter, registered in Papua New Guinea as P2-MCB. It had a serial number of PCE-PG0073. The aircraft was configured to carry 19 passengers and two crew, with a maximum take-off weight of 5,670 kg. The aircraft was fitted with the required equipment for two-pilot Instrument Flight Rules. An autopilot system was not fitted in the aircraft. The aircraft had accumulated a total flying time of 46,700 hours. The aircraft was built in 1974.

== Passengers ==
The aircraft was carrying 11 passengers and two crew. The passengers included eight Australian tourists on their way to trek the Kokoda Track, two tour guides (one Australian and one Papua New Guinean) from No Roads Expeditions tour company, and a Japanese tourist. Seven of the nine Australian passengers on board came from Victoria, and two from Queensland. Aboard the flight was a part-time tour guide Matthew Leonard, who was the son of Western Australia police inspector Bill Leonard.

Nationality	Passengers	Crew	Total
Australia	9	0	9
Papua New Guinea	1	2	3
Japan	1	0	1
Total	11	2	13

The Captain was Jannie Moala from Papua New Guinea. She had accumulated 2,177 flying hours, of which 1,836 of them were on the Twin Otter. AIC found no evidence that she had been trained by Airlines PNG for use of the Global Positioning System (GPS). However, training records that were provided by the operator showed that items identified within the operator's training syllabus that included the introduction to, and use of the GPS for en route navigation had been marked by the training captain as complete. No evidence as to the extent of that training, or level of understanding attained by Moala, was provided by the operator. The operator stated that at about the time of the accident, a GPS training package specific to the conduct of GPS non-precision approaches was being introduced.

The co-pilot was First Officer Rodney Souka from Papua New Guinea. He had accumulated 2,150 flying hours, of which 1,940 were on the Twin Otter. AIC did not find any evidence that Souka had been trained by Airlines PNG for using the Global Positioning System (GPS) on the aircraft.

== Investigation ==
The accident was investigated by the Accident Investigation Commission (AIC), assisted by the Australian Transport Safety Bureau (ATSB). The AIC could only determine the cause of the crash without access to a Cockpit Voice recorder or Flight Data Recorder, as neither recorder were required on a Twin Otter. The lack of both flight data and cockpit voice recorders adversely affected a full understanding of the accident investigation. Alternatively, on board the aircraft was a small electronic GPS tracking and data telemetry device. Using the device's Non-Volatile memory, the ATSB was able to piece together portions of the flight path.

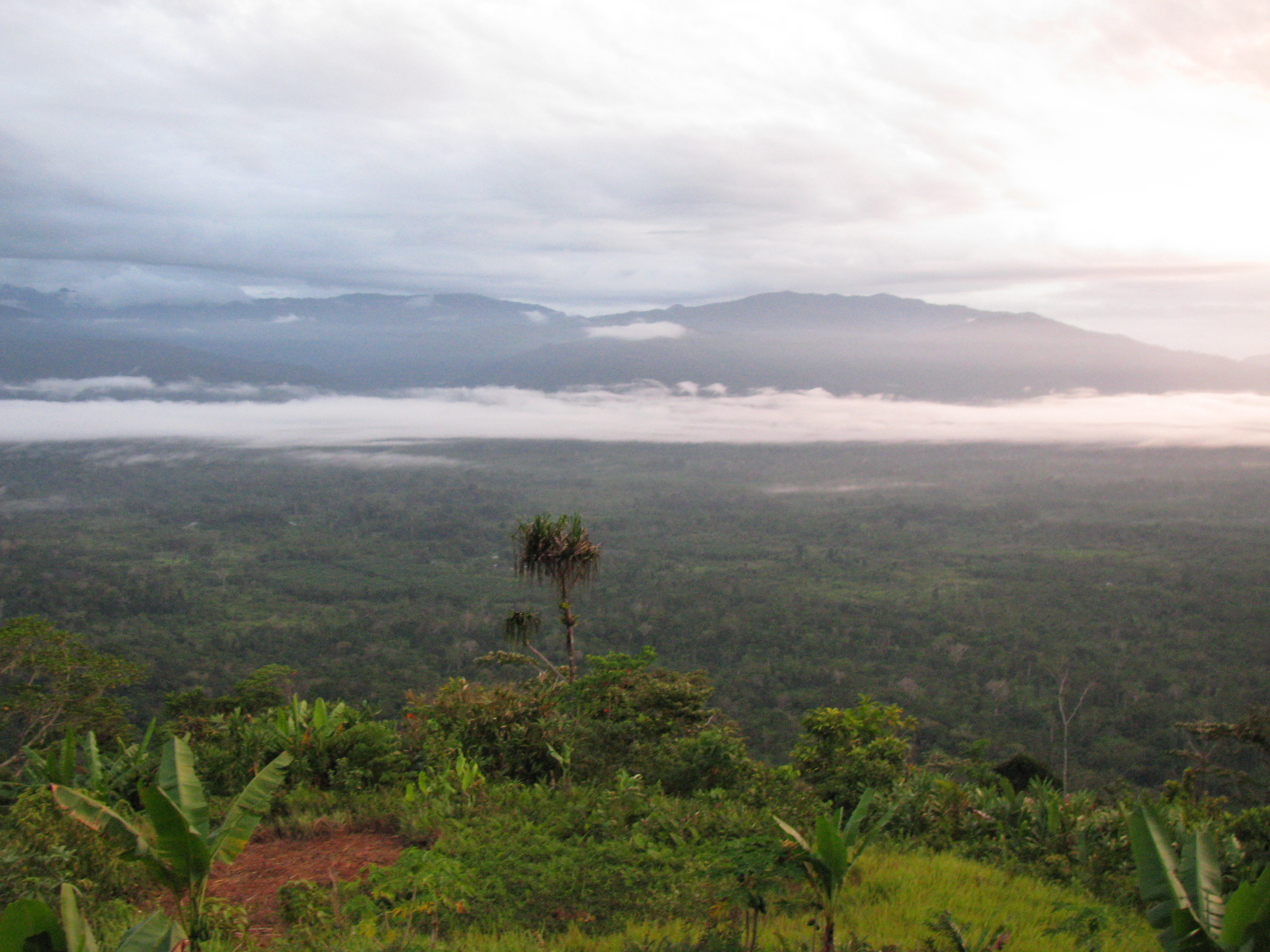
High terrain in the surrounding area of Kokoda Valley.

The weather in Kokoda Gap at the time was poor. Based on eyewitnesses accounts and photographic evidence retrieved by ATSB, Kokoda Gap was obscured by clouds at the time of the accident, making it difficult for the pilots to know if they were in close to terrain. Given the surrounding mountainous terrain, the evident cloud in the Kokoda Gap, had the potential to severely limit the crew's escape options, increase their workload, and test their situational awareness. A reduction in situational awareness and the presence of mountainous terrain during an approach are known risk factors in instances of controlled flight into terrain (CFIT).

Later investigation found that only one pilot had an IFR rating, while the other did not. The co-pilot, First Officer Rodney Souka, had been assessed for instrument approach procedures; however, he was not qualified for flight under the IFR. Although the crew had planned the flight under Instrument flight rules, the forecast cloud in the area should have alerted the crew that under the actual conditions, visual flight in the Kokoda Gap would prove problematic. The visual descent into the Kokoda Gap required 5 km visibility, while at the time of the accident, the visibility was less than 5 km.

The Australian ATSB then turned their attentions to Souka. They examined his postmortem and medical history. Investigators found that Souka had critical coronary artery heart disease, and the examining pathologist considered that Souka could have had a medical emergency at any time. Souka's relatives reported that they were not aware of any significant medical condition affecting him. If an emergency occurred in mid-air as the aircraft approached the cloud to the north of the Kokoda Gap would have instantly increased Moala's workload and distracted her from the primary task of flying the aircraft. Both those factors are known to increase the risk of CFIT.

Investigators noted that Kokoda Airport was lacking in basic navigation infrastructure. The lack of ground-based navigation aids at Kokoda Airport meant that the only potential navigation assistance for the crew during their approach to Kokoda was from a GPS, or via the ground-based non-directional beacon/distance measuring equipment (NDB/DME) located at Girua Airport.

The investigation concluded that the accident was probably a controlled flight into terrain: that is, an otherwise airworthy aircraft was unintentionally flown into terrain, with little or no awareness by the crew of the impending collision.

== See also ==
- Air New Zealand Flight 901
- Trigana Air Service Flight 267
