= Omie =

Omie may refer to:

- Ömie language
- Naomi (given name), nickname Omie
  - Omie Wise (1789–1808), American murder victim
- Omie Singh (born 1957), South African politician and businessman
- Omie Sparkman, a fictional character in the TV series Fargo
