= Aeka =

Aeka may refer to:

- Aeka language
- Ayeka Masaki Jurai, otherwise romanized as Aeka, a fictional character in the anime series Tenchi Muyo!
