= Isurava, Papua New Guinea =

Coordinates: 9°00′S 147°44′E

Isurava is a small village in Papua New Guinea, located in Oro Province, on the Kokoda Track. It is near the site of the Battle of Isurava that occurred over the period 26 to 31 August 1942, as Australian forces were being pushed back toward Port Moresby by the advancing Japanese. The present site is to the north of the wartime village. It is the site of the Isurava Memorial, constructed in 2002 in remembrance of all those Australians and Papua New Guineans who fought and those who died on the Kokoda Track in 1942.

On 11 August 2009 Airlines PNG Flight 4684 crashed into a mountain on the opposite side of the valley from Isurava, high above Misima village. It was attempting to go-around at Kokoda Airport. All 13 passengers and crew died in the accident.

== See also ==
- Kokoda Track campaign
