= Nawaru language =

Papuan language of Papua New Guinea

Nawaru
- Sirio
- Native to: Papua New Guinea
- Region: Oro Province
- Native speakers: (190 cited 1990)
- Language family: Trans–New Guinea: Yareban; Nawaru–Yareba; Nawaru

Language codes
- ISO 639-3: nwr
- Glottolog: nawa1258
- ELP: Nawaru

Nawaru, or Sirio, is a Papuan language. It is spoken in the village of Sibia (9.437132°S 148.30083°E) in Namudi ward, Safia Rural LLG, Ijivitari District, Oro Province, in the "tail" of Papua New Guinea.

Nawaru is described by Ethnologue as "very similar" to Yareba.
