= HKK =

HKK may refer to:

- Armenian Communist Party (Armenian: Հայաստանի կոմունիստական կուսակցություն, ՀԿԿ; Hayastani Komunistakan Kusaktsutyun)
- Hokitika Airport, in New Zealand
- Hunjara language, spoken in Papua New Guinea
