= Orokaiva people =

Papua New Guinea indigenous people

Orokaiva
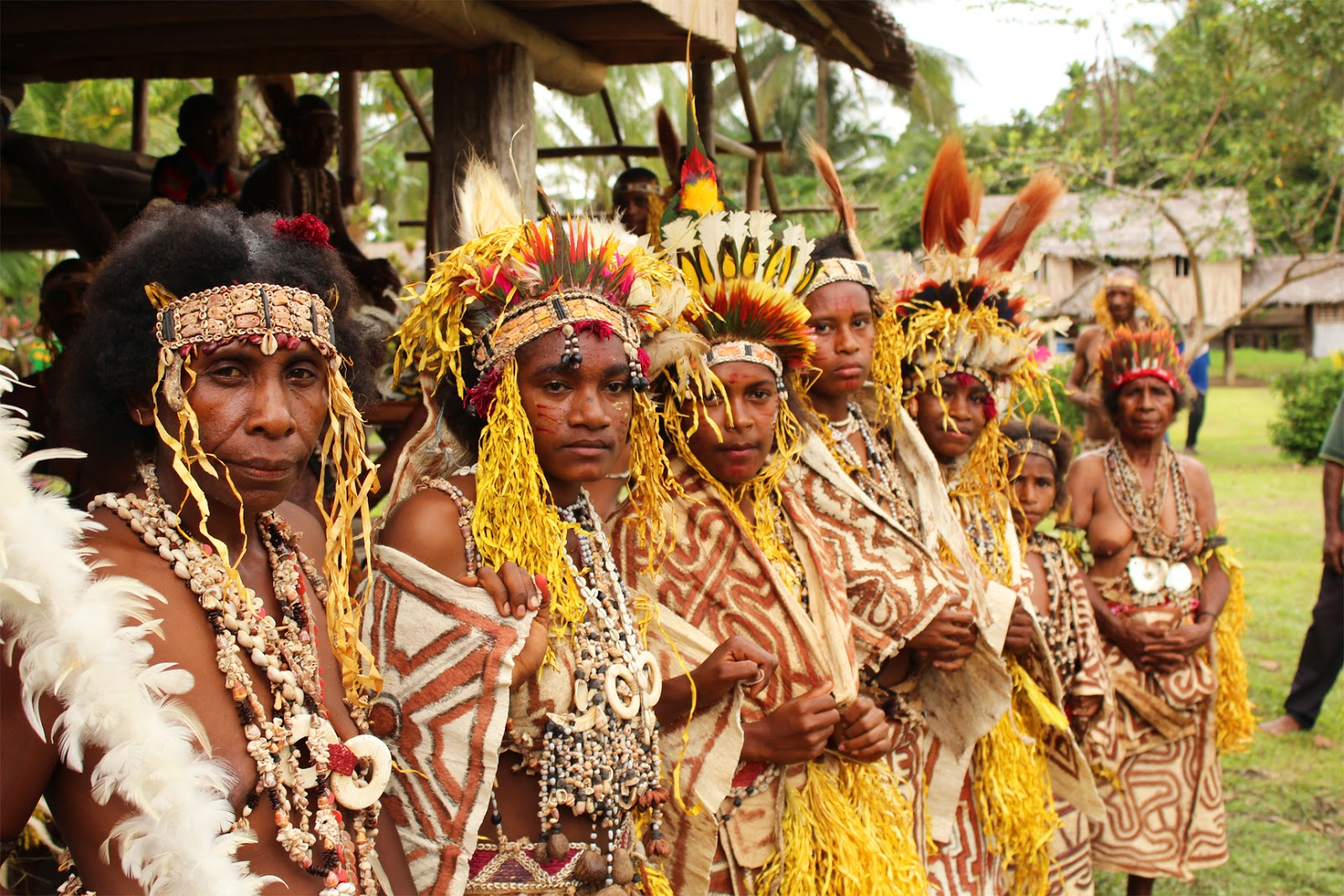
- Orokaiva people in traditional attire

Regions with significant populations
- Papua New Guinea: 35,000 (2000)

Languages
- Orokaiva (Binanderean languages)

Religion
- Indigenous beliefs

The Orokaiva are a people indigenous to Papua New Guinea. The Orokaiva occupy what is now Oro Province and the periphery of the area they inhabi is marked by the Owen Stanley Range in the south, German New Guinea in the west, and the Hydrographers Range in the south. In 1930, they were reported as being speakers of Binandere and divided into three groups: the Umo-ke ("River People"); the Eva-Embo ("the Salt-Water People"); and the Pereho ("the Inland People").

The people of Orokaiva have traditional stories that some of their ancestors were giants. These can be proven by traditional artifacts of the past kept by knowledge keepers and modern generations of the Orokaiva, including oversized armbands, stone axes, and spears. They are described as great warriors and fighters and have won many traditional wars to protect their land.

== Rites of passage ==
The rite of passage through which a child becomes an adult in Orokaiva society involves both girls and boys. It begins with masked figures, dressed in bird feathers and pigs' tusks and representing ancestral spirits, entering the village as if on a hunt, and herding up the children who are to go through initiation. The figures shout out "Bite, bite, bite," and physically assault pigs, trees and children, before taking the children away by force to a platform that is much like that used for killing pigs, in a symbolic killing of the children. They then take the children into the forest, where the children are left, blindfolded, in an isolated hut, in silence – they are then told that they have now become the spirits of the dead. In the hut, they are told the symbolism of the different feathers and the nature of sacred dances. Following this, they return to their village, this time acting as hunters, just as their captors had originally done.
