= Barai language =

Koiarian language spoken in Papua New Guinea

Barai
- Region: Papua New Guinea
- Native speakers: 800 (2003)
- Language family: Trans–New Guinea: Koiarian; Baraic; Barai

Language codes
- ISO 639-3: bbb
- Glottolog: nucl1630

Barai is a Koiarian language spoken in Oro Province of Papua New Guinea.

== Locations ==
The Birarie dialect is spoken in Itokama (9.198601°S 148.265012°E), Madokoro, Naokanane (9.27403°S 148.237107°E), and Umuate (9.263631°S 148.236668°E) villages in Ufia ward, Afore Rural LLG. Other Barai dialects are also spoken in Rigo Inland Rural LLG.

== Alphabet ==
The Barai language has 19 letters (Aa, Bb, Cc, Dd, Ee, Ff, Gg, Hh, Ii, Kk, Mm, Nn, Oo, Rr, Ss, Zz, Tt, Uu, Vv) and one diphthong (Ae ae).

== Sample text ==
Godi Asoe nuvuone kabo gufe samuamo. No ive one Akae ije aroeke. No vierafe are ro ire boeje ume igia naovo ije samuagiadufuo. Ro kuke no vierafe izege saove gufia bu kevo ijiege e ume igia kariva ije bu vame besu ijiege kenoedufuo. Ivia ire no mumaza inoedufuo ije vajuone. Ro ni izege e binobuo ise ije no giana arevo ijiege ni ise nuvuone guona arene. Ro ade no kena una vame ise ijia biesiruomo. Ro kuke ni ifejuoga no ire ise ije Setani fu kena vame nuvuone arafiruomo ijia akariakinu oenoene.
