= Yekora language =

Language

Yekora
- Native to: Papua New Guinea
- Region: Morobe Province
- Native speakers: (1,100 cited 2000)
- Language family: Trans–New Guinea: Binanderean; Zia–Yekora; Yekora

Language codes
- ISO 639-3: ykr
- Glottolog: yeko1240

Yekora is a Papuan language spoken in Morobe Province, Papua New Guinea. It is part of the Binandere family of the Trans–New Guinea phylum of languages, and is particularly close to Zia.
