= Suena language =

Papuan language spoken in Papua New Guinea

Suena
- Native to: Papua New Guinea
- Region: Morobe Province
- Native speakers: (3,600 cited 2000)
- Language family: Trans–New Guinea: Binanderean; Suena
- Dialects: Yarawi

Language codes
- ISO 639-3: sue
- Glottolog: suen1241
- ELP: Suena
- Suena is classified as Critically Endangered by the UNESCO Atlas of the World's Languages in Danger.

Suena is a Papuan language spoken in Morobe Province, in the "tail" of Papua New Guinea. It is part of the Binanderean family of the Trans–New Guinea phylum of languages.

The Yarawi people spoke Suena during most of the 20th century, but may have switched to Binandere.
