= Onjob language =

Dagan language spoken in Papua New Guinea

Onjob
- Native to: Papua New Guinea
- Region: Oro Province
- Native speakers: (150 cited 2000)
- Language family: Trans–New Guinea: Dagan; Onjob

Language codes
- ISO 639-3: onj
- Glottolog: onjo1240
- ELP: Onjob
- Onjob is classified as Vulnerable by the UNESCO Atlas of the World's Languages in Danger.

Onjob is a Papuan language of New Guinea. It is a rather divergent member of the Dagan family.

It is spoken in Koreat (9.342387°S 149.138425°E) and Naukwate (9.333002°S 149.152413°E) villages in Tufi Rural LLG, Oro Province.
