= Margaret Jolly =

Australian anthropologist

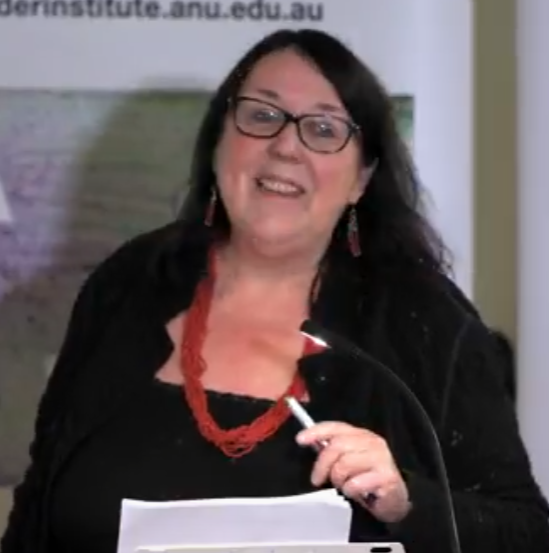
- At an ANU lecture in 2018
- Born: 12 April 1949 (age 77); Sydney, Australia
- Occupation: Anthropologist
- Awards: Member of the Order of Australia (2020)

Margaret Anne Jolly AM FASSA (born 12 April 1949), born in Sydney, Australia is a historical anthropologist recognized as a world expert on gender in Oceania. She is a professor in the College of Asia and the Pacific and the Convenor of the Gender Institute at the Australian National University in Canberra. Jolly is also a Fellow of the Academy of the Social Sciences in Australia.

== Career ==
From 2010 to 2015, Jolly held an Australian Research Council Laureate Fellowship, an award valued at $2.7M. She has written extensively on gender in the Pacific, on exploratory voyages and travel writing, missions and contemporary Christianity, maternity and sexuality, cinema and art.

Jolly has held a number of prestigious academic roles, including Head of the Gender Relations Centre 1992-2009; Burns Distinguished Visiting Chair, History, University of Hawaiʻi at Mānoa (1998); Visiting Professor, University of California, Santa Cruz (2002); Visiting Professor, Centre National de Recherche Scientifique and École des Hautes Études en Sciences Sociales, France (2009). Her work is widely held in libraries.

== Honours ==
Jolly was made a Member of the Order of Australia in the 2020 Australia Day Honours for "significant service to education, particularly to gender and Pacific studies."

== Selected works ==
- Family and gender in the Pacific: Domestic contradictions and the colonial impact co-edited with Martha Macintyre
- Women of the Place, Kastom, Colonialism and Gender in Vanuatu (1994)
- Sites of Desire, Economies of Pleasure: Sexualities in Asia and the Pacific, co-edited with Lenore Manderson (1997)
- Maternities and Modernities: Colonial and Postcolonial Experiences in Asia and the Pacific, co-edited with Kalpana Ram (1998)
- Borders of Being: Citizenship, Fertility and Sexuality in Asia and the Pacific, co-edited with Kalpana Ram (2001)
- Birthing in the Pacific: Beyond Tradition and Modernity?, co-edited with Vicki Lukere (2001)
- Oceanic Encounters: Exchange, Desire, Violence, co-edited with Serge Tcherkézoff and Darrell Tryon (2009)
- Engendering Violence in Papua New Guinea co-edited with Christine Stewart and Carolyn Brewer (2012)
- Gender Violence and Human Rights: Seeking Justice in Fiji, Papua New Guinea and Vanuatu co-edited with Aletta Biersack and Martha Macintyre
