= Kokoda Airport =

Airport in Kokoda, Oro, Papua New Guinea

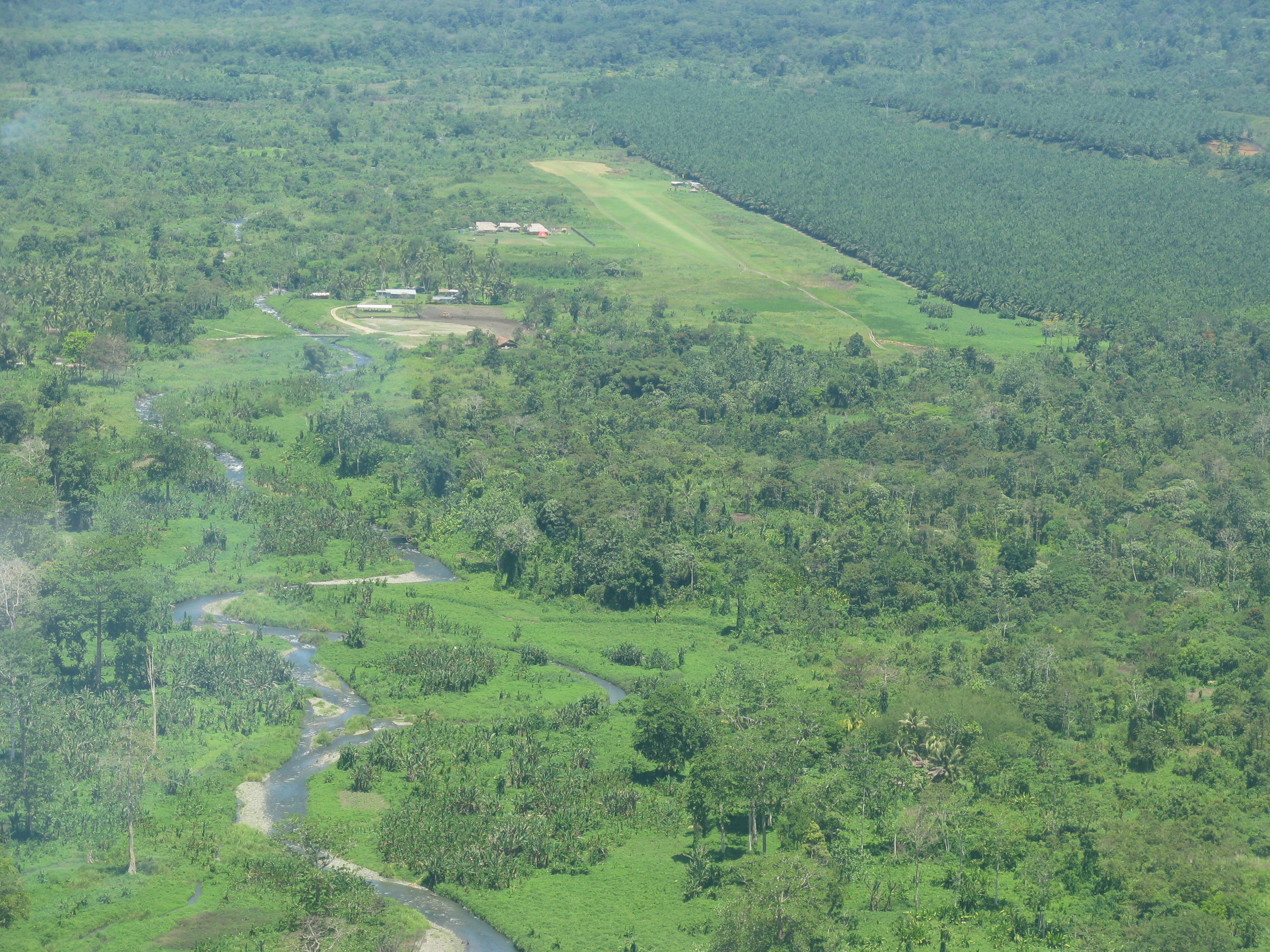
- IATA: KKD; ICAO: AYKP

Summary
- Location: Kokoda, Papua New Guinea
- Elevation AMSL: 10 ft / 3 m
- Coordinates: 8°52′59″S 147°44′0″E

Map
- Location of airport in Papua New Guinea

Kokoda Airport (IATA: KKD, ICAO: AYKP) is an airport in Kokoda, Papua New Guinea. The airfield was a focal point of the intense battle along the famous Kokoda trail, during the second World War. It was taken and retaken several times by both Japanese and Australian troops, every time with heavy casualties.

== History ==
Kokoda Airport, known then as Kokoda Airstrip, was built in 1932 to support gold mining operations along Mambare River and in the Yodda valley and surrounding mountains. A single grass landing strip was built roughly orientated north to south. An iron shed was located in the southeast corner of the runway, which was used for loading aircraft. Located in the northeast corner was a barracks building used by the Papuan Infantry Battalion.

On 10 August, 1942, the airfield was occupied by the Japanese Army. However, it was never utilized as an airfield as aircraft rather airdropped supplies to troops on the ground. By late October 1942, the Japanese army had withdrawn from Kokoda Airstrip. Kokoda Airstrip was used by Stinson ambulance aircraft to evacuate casualties.

== Incidents and accidents ==
- On 11 August 2009, Airlines PNG Flight 4684, a de Havilland Canada DHC-6 Twin Otter carrying 11 passengers and 2 crew, flying from Port Moresby, crashed into a mountain at Isurava, Papua New Guinea whilst attempting a go around. All passengers and crew perished in the accident.
