= Greater Binanderean languages =

Language family

Greater Binanderean
- Guhu-Oro
- Geographic distribution: Oro Province and parts of southern Morobe Province, Papua New Guinea
- Linguistic classification: Binanderean–Goilalan: Greater Binanderean
- Subdivisions: Binanderean (Oro); Guhu-Samane

Language codes
- Glottolog: bina1276
- Map: The Greater Binanderean languages of New Guinea Greater Binanderean languages Trans–New Guinea languages Other Papuan languages Austronesian languages Uninhabited

The Greater Binanderean or Guhu-Oro languages are a language family spoken along the northeast coast of the Papuan Peninsula – the "Bird's Tail" of New Guinea – and appear to be a recent expansion from the north. They were classified as a branch of the Trans–New Guinea languages by Stephen Wurm (1975) and Malcolm Ross (2005), but removed (along with the related Goilalan languages) by Timothy Usher (2020). The Binandere family proper is transparently valid; Ross connected it to the Guhu-Semane isolate based on pronominal evidence, and this has been confirmed by Smallhorn (2011). Proto-Binanderean (which excludes Guhu-Samane) has been reconstructed in Smallhorn (2011).

== Language contact ==
There is evidence that settlements of people speaking Oceanic languages along the Binanderean coast were gradually absorbed into inland communities speaking Binanderean languages (Bradshaw 2017). For instance, the SOV word order of Papuan Tip languages is due to Binanderean influence.

Korafe displays significant influence from Oceanic languages. Meanwhile, Maisin, spoken in Oro Province, is an Oceanic language with very heavy Binanderean influence and shows characteristics typical of mixed languages.

Spoken in Morobe Province, Guhu-Samane is divergent, which may be due to extensive historical contact with Oceanic languages such as Numbami.

== Classification ==
Greater Binanderean consists of the Guhu-Samane language and the Binanderean languages proper. Smallhorn (2011:444) provides the following classification:

- Greater Binanderean
  - Guhu-Samane
  - Binanderean
    - Yekora
    - North Binanderean
      - Suena
      - Zia
    - Nuclear Binanderean
      - Binandere
      - South Binanderean
        - Orokaivic
          - Aeka (Northern Orokaiva)
          - Orokaiva
          - Hunjara (Mountain Orokaiva)
        - Coastal Binanderean
          - Notu-Yega (Ewage)
          - Gaena-Korafe
          - Baruga

However, South Binanderean and Nuclear Binanderean are non-genealogical linkages. Usher (2020), who calls the Binanderean languages proper "Oro" after Oro Province, classifies them very similarly, apart from not reproducing the non-cladistic linkages:

- Guhu–Oro (= Greater Binanderean)
  - Guhu-Samane
  - Oro (= Binanderean)
    - Binandere
    - Yekora
    - Ewage-Notu
    - Suena–Zia (= North Binanderean)
      - Suena
      - Zia
    - Central Oro (= Orokaivic)
      - Aeka
      - Orokaiva
      - Hunjara
    - Southeast Oro (= Coastal Binanderean, minus Ewage-Notu)
      - Baruga
      - Gaina–Korafe
        - Gaina
        - Korafe-Yegha

== Demographics ==
Smallhorn (2011:3) provides population figures for the following Binanderean languages.

- Guhu-Samane: 12,800
- Suena: 3,000
- Yekora: 1,000
- Zia: 3,000
- Mawae: 943
- Binandere: 7,000 (including Ambasi)
- Aeka: 3,400
- Orokaiva: 24,000
- Hunjara: 8,770
- Notu: 12,900 (including Yega)
- Gaena: 1,410
- Baruga: 2,230
- Doghoro: 270
- Korafe: 3,630

Total
about 80,000

== Proto-language ==
=== Pronouns ===
Ross (2005) reconstructs both independent pronouns and verbal person prefixes:

| sg. | pronoun | prefix |
|---|---|---|
| 1 | *na | *a- |
| 2 | *ni | *i- |
| 3 | *nu | *u- |

Only 1sg continues the Trans-New Guinea set.

=== Vocabulary ===
The following selected reconstructions of Proto-Binanderean and other lower-level reconstructions are from the Trans-New Guinea database:

| gloss | Proto-Binandere | Proto-North-Binandere | Proto-Nuclear-Binandere |
|---|---|---|---|
| head | *ciro; *giti | | |
| hair | *tu | | |
| ear | | *doŋgarә | *onje |
| eye | *dibe; *diti | | |
| nose | | *mendә | |
| tooth | *di | | |
| tongue | *VwVwV | | |
| dog | *sinә | | |
| pig | *pu | | |
| bird | | | *ndi |
| egg | *munju | | |
| blood | *ju; *or{a,o}rә | | |
| bone | *bobo; *wetu | | |
| skin | *tamә | | |
| breast | *ami | | |
| tree | *i | | |
| man | *embә | | |
| woman | *bam{u,o}nә | | *ewVtu |
| sky | *utu | | |
| sun | *iji; *waeko | *wari | |
| moon | *inua | | *kariga |
| fire | *awo | | |
| stone | *g{o,e}mb{a,i}(ro) | *daba | *ganuma |
| road, path | *begata; *esa; *ndai | | |
| name | *jajo; *jawә | | |
| eat | *ind-; *mind- | | |
| one | *daba | | |

== Evolution ==
Greater Binanderean reflexes of proto-Trans-New Guinea (pTNG) etyma are:

Binandere language:

- birigi ‘lightning’ < *(m,mb)elak
- mendo ‘nose’ < *m(i,u)undu
- mundu ‘kidney, testicles’ < *mundun ‘internal organs’
- (gisi)-moka ‘eye’ < *(kiti)-maŋgV
- mu ‘sap’ < *muk ‘sap, milk’
- ami ‘breast’ < *amu
- kopuru ‘head’ < *kV(mb,p)(i,u)tu
- ji ‘teeth’ < *(s,)ti(s,t)i ‘tooth’
- kosiwa ‘spittle’, kosiwa ari- ‘to spit’ < *kasipa tV- ‘to spit’
- afa ‘father’ < *apa
- embo ‘man’ < *ambi
- izi ‘tree’ < *inda
- ganuma ‘stone’ < *ka[na]m(a,u)una
- tumba ‘darkness’ < *k(i,u)tuma ‘night’
- biriga ‘lightning’ < *(m,mb)elak ‘(fire)light’
- (aßa)-raka ‘fire’ < *la(ŋg,k)a ‘ashes’
- ni ‘bird’ < *n[e]i
- na- ‘eat, drink’ < *na-
- put- ‘to blow’ < *pu + verb
- tupo ‘short’ < *tu(p,mb)a[C]

Korafe language:

- munju ‘egg’ < *mundun ‘internal organs’
- soso ‘urine’ < *sisi
- aßa-raka ‘burning stick’ < *la(ŋg,k)a ‘ashes’
- mut- ‘give’ < *mV-
- niŋg- ‘hear, understand’ < *nVŋg- ‘know’

Suena language:

- boga-masa ‘destitute’ < *mbeŋga-masi ‘orphan, widow and child’
- mia ‘mother’ < *am(a,i)
- tumou ‘night’ < *k(i,u)tuma
- ma ‘taro’ < *mV
- asi ‘netbag’ < *at(i,u)

Yega language:

- kari ‘ear’ < *kand(e,i)k(V]

== Phonotactics ==
Like the Koiarian languages, Binanderean languages only allow for open syllables and do not allow final CVC.
