= Pacific Linguistics =

Australian educational book publisher

- Industry: Educational Book Publishing
- Founded: 1963; 63 years ago
- Founder: Stephen Wurm
- Headquarters: Australian National University, Canberra, Australia
- Website: pacling.anu.edu.au

Pacific Linguistics was established in 1963 as a non-profit publisher at the Australian National University, Canberra, publishing linguistic books (such as grammars and dictionaries) on the languages of Oceania, the Pacific, Australia, Indonesia, Malaysia, the Philippines, Southeast Asia, South Asia, and East Asia. It has four series

- Series A - Occasional Papers
- Series B - Monographs
- Series C - Books
- Series D - Special Publications

Since 2012, Pacific Linguistics has been published by Walter de Gruyter.

== Managing editors ==
Stephen Wurm was the founding editor.

Tom Dutton was the managing editor of Pacific Linguistics from 1987 to 1996. Other former managing editors are Malcolm Ross, Darrell Tryon, John Bowden, and Paul Sidwell.

The managing editor as of August 2026 is Alexander Adelaar.

== See also ==
- ANU Press
