= Afore Rural LLG =

Local-level government in Papua New Guinea

- Country: Papua New Guinea
- Province: Oro Province
- Time zone: UTC+10 (AEST)

District map of Oro Province

Afore Rural LLG is a local-level government (LLG) of Oro Province, Papua New Guinea. The Namiae language and Barai language, both Koiarian languages, are spoken in the LLG.

== Wards ==
1. Yoivi
2. Niniuri
3. Kawowoki
4. Kaura
5. Siurani
6. Kowena
7. Dea
8. Siribu
9. Natanga
10. Gora
11. Tahama
12. Umbuara
13. Kokoro
14. Ufia (Barai language speakers)
15. Toma
16. Aiari
17. Yaure
18. Gorabuna
