= Kokoda =

- Location within Papua New Guinea
- Coordinates: 8°52′40″S 147°44′15″E
- Country: Papua New Guinea
- Province: Oro (Northern)
- District: Sohe District
- LLG: Kokoda Rural LLG
- Elevation: 370 m (1,210 ft)

Population (2011), quandl.com
  - Total: 658

Languages
  - Main languages: Koiari, Motu
- Time zone: UTC+10 (AEST)
- Location: 55 km (34 mi) WSW of Popondetta
- Annual rainfall: 5,000 mm (196.9 in)
- Climate: Af

Kokoda is a station town in the Oro Province of Papua New Guinea. It is famous as the northern end of the Kokoda Track, site of the eponymous Kokoda Track campaign of World War II. In that campaign, it had strategic significance because it had the only airfield along the Track. In the decades preceding, it had been a foothills settlement near the gold fields.

Kokoda is located within the administrative divisions of Kokoda Rural LLG.

== Establishment of the station town ==
The British colonial administration found that a base for the Papuan Native Constabulary and colonial control was required to subdue the region and the government station of Kokoda was founded in 1904.

== World War II ==
An amphibious landing by Japanese forces to capture Port Moresby was postponed indefinitely after the Battle of Midway. The Japanese command believed there to be a road leading through the Owen-Stanleys from Kokoda to the south coast. An invasion force was landed on the north coast near Buna and Gona from 21 July 1942. Two battles were fought in and around the village during the opening stages of the Kokoda Track campaign. Kokoda was reoccupied by Australian forces on 2 November 1942, following the Japanese withdrawal back to the north coast.

The station is linked by a rough road and a two-hour journey to the provincial capital of Popondetta.

In August 2009 Kokoda airstrip was the destination for Airlines PNG Flight CG4684 that crashed whilst attempting to land. All 13 people on board were killed in the crash, including nine Australian passengers who were due to trek the Kokoda Track, a Japanese passenger, and three Papua New Guineans, including the two pilots.

== Climate ==
Kokoda has a tropical rainforest climate with heavy to very heavy rainfall year-round.

Climate data for Kokoda
Month	Jan	Feb	Mar	Apr	May	Jun	Jul	Aug	Sep	Oct	Nov	Dec	Year
Mean daily maximum °C (°F)	31.7 (89.1)	31.5 (88.7)	31.3 (88.3)	30.6 (87.1)	30.3 (86.5)	29.5 (85.1)	29.2 (84.6)	29.4 (84.9)	30.1 (86.2)	31.1 (88.0)	31.3 (88.3)	31.5 (88.7)	30.6 (87.1)
Daily mean °C (°F)	26.2 (79.2)	26.0 (78.8)	25.9 (78.6)	25.4 (77.7)	25.3 (77.5)	24.6 (76.3)	24.2 (75.6)	24.3 (75.7)	24.8 (76.6)	25.4 (77.7)	25.6 (78.1)	25.9 (78.6)	25.3 (77.5)
Mean daily minimum °C (°F)	20.8 (69.4)	20.6 (69.1)	20.6 (69.1)	20.3 (68.5)	20.4 (68.7)	19.8 (67.6)	19.2 (66.6)	19.2 (66.6)	19.6 (67.3)	19.7 (67.5)	19.9 (67.8)	20.4 (68.7)	20.0 (68.1)
Average precipitation mm (inches)	389 (15.3)	376 (14.8)	372 (14.6)	323 (12.7)	280 (11.0)	169 (6.7)	180 (7.1)	196 (7.7)	276 (10.9)	383 (15.1)	370 (14.6)	401 (15.8)	3,715 (146.3)
Source: Climate-Data.org

== See also ==
- Kokoda Rural LLG
- New Guinea campaign
- Kokoda Memorial Hospital
