= Binandere language =

Trans–New Guinea language spoken in Papua New Guinea

Binandere
- Native to: Papua New Guinea
- Region: Oro Province
- Native speakers: 7,000 (2007)
- Language family: Trans–New Guinea: Binanderean; Binandere
- Dialects: Binandere; Tainya Dawari (Ambasi); Yewa Buie

Language codes
- ISO 639-3: bhg
- Glottolog: bina1277

Binandere is a Papuan language spoken in the "tail" of Papua New Guinea.

== Phonology ==
Binandere has 11 consonants: voiced and voiceless bilabials, alveolars, and velars; voiced labial and alveolar nasals; the flap /ɾ/; the voiced bilabial fricative /β/ and the palatal approximant /j/.

Consonants of Binandere
	Bilabial	Alveolar	Palatal	Velar
Plosive	p b	t d		k ɡ
Nasal	m	n		
Fricative	β			
Approximant			j	
Tap/flap		ɾ		

Binandere also has the 5 common vowels /ɑ e i o u/ and their five nasal counterparts.

Vowels of Binandere
	Front	Central	Back
Close	i ĩ		u ũ
Mid	e ẽ		o õ
Open		ɑ ɑ̃	

These vowels can be combined to form up to 11 possible diphthongs:

- Oral: /iu/ /ei/ /eo/ /eu/ /ɑi/ /ɑe/ /ɑo/ /ɑu/ /oi/ /oe/ /ou/
- Nasal: /ẽĩ/ /ɑ̃ĩ/ /ɑ̃õ/ /õũ/

== Evolution ==
Below are some reflexes of proto-Trans-New Guinea proposed by Pawley (2012):

proto-Trans-New Guinea	Binandere
*m(i,u)ndu ‘nose’	mendo
*m(o,u)k ‘milk, sap, breast’	mu ‘sap’
*mundun ‘internal organs’	mundu ‘kidney, testicles’
*(ŋg,k)iti-maŋgV ‘eye’	(gisi)-moka ‘eye’
*mV ‘taro’	(Suena ma ‘taro’)
*mV- ‘give’	(Korafe mut- ‘give’)
*(m,mb)elak ‘light, lightning’	biriga ‘lightning’
*am(a,i) ‘mother’	ai (*m lost before i), (Suena mia)
*amu ‘breast’	ami
*k(i,u)tuma ‘night, morning’	tumba ‘darkness’
*na ‘1SG’	na
*na- ‘eat’	na- ‘eat, drink’
*n[e]i ‘bird’	ni
*nVŋg- ‘know, hear, see’	(Korafe niŋg- ‘hear, understand’)
pMadang-Binandere *nu[k] ‘3SG free pronoun’	nu
*ka(m,mb)(a,u)na ‘stone’	ganuma (Korafe ghamana ‘stone’)
*mundun ‘internal organs’	mundu ‘kidney, testicles’, (Korafe munju ‘egg’)
*mbalaŋ ‘flame’	(?) beriberi ‘be alight’
*mbalaŋ ‘flame’	beri-beri ‘be alight’
*mbulikV ‘turn (oneself)’	(Guhu-Samane burisi eetaqu ‘turn over, turn s.th. around’)
*mbeŋga-masi ‘orphan’, ‘widow and child’	(Suena boga masa ‘destitute widow and child’)
*pu + verb ‘to blow’	Binandere put- ‘blow’
*ambi ‘man’	embo (Guhu-Samane abi ‘man’)
*kV(mb,p)(i,u)t(i,u) ‘head’	kopuru
*[ka]tumba(C) ‘short’	tupo
*kambu(s,t)(a,u) ‘smoke’	(?) imbosi
*apa ‘father’	afa (Korafe afa)
*ndaŋgi/ndiŋga ‘tie’	(Suena di ‘tie’)
*m(i,u)ndu ‘nose’	mendo
*mundun ‘internal organs’	mundu ‘kidney, testicles’, etc.’)
*ka(nd,t)(e,i)kV ‘ear’	(Yega kari ‘ear’)
*inda ‘tree’	izi (cf. Notu ri)
*[ka]tumba(C) ‘short’	tupo
*k(i,u)tuma ‘night, morning’	Binandere tumba ‘darkness’, ‘night’)
*kV(mb,p)(i,u)t(i,u) ‘head’	kopuru
*(ŋg,k)iti-maŋgV ‘eye’	gisi moka
*at(i,u) ‘netbag’	asi (Suena ati ‘netbag’)
*si[si] ‘urine’	pBinandere *susu (Korafe soso)
*titi ‘tooth’	ji
*asi ‘string, rope’	asi ‘vine, string, rope’)
*kasipa ‘to spit’	kosiwa ‘spittle’
*mbeŋga-masi ‘orphan’	(Suena boga masa ‘destitute’) ‘widow and child’
*kanjipa ‘sun’	(?) kariga ‘moon’
*(ŋg,k)iti-maŋgV ‘eye’	gisi-(moka)
*(ŋg,k)iti-maŋgV ‘eye’	(gisi)-moka (Korafe móko ‘core, centre’)
*nVŋg- ‘know, hear, see’	(pBinandere *niŋg- ‘hear’, Korafe niŋg- ‘hear, understand’)
*mbeŋga-masi ‘orphan’	(Suena boga-masa ‘destitute’) ‘widow and child’
*kV(mb,p)(i,u)t(i,u) ‘head’	kopuru
*ka(nd,t)(e,i)kV ‘ear’	(Yega kari)
*kasipa ‘to spit’	kosiwa ‘spittle’, kosiwa ari ‘to spit’
*ka(m,mb)(a,u)na ‘stone’	ganuma (metath.) (Korafe ɣamana)
*ka(m,mb)(a,u)na ‘stone’	ganuma (metath.) (Korafe ɣamana ‘stone’)
*k(o,u)ndVC ‘bone’	(?) undoru ‘bones’
*kumV- ‘die’	(?) abu-bugari ‘dead people’, (pBin *ambu- ‘wither, be sick, dying’)
*kambu(s,t)(a,u) ‘smoke’	(?) imbosi
*ka(nd,t)(e,i)kV ‘ear’	(Yega kari)
*la(ŋg,k)a ‘ashes’	(aßa)-raka ‘fire’
*sikal/*sakil ‘hand, claw’	(?) siŋgu ‘finger’, finger’)
*(m,mb)elak ‘light, lightning’	biriga ‘lightning’
*(m,mb)elak ‘light, lightning’	birigi
