= Collingwood Bay =

Bay in Papua New Guinea

Coordinates: 9°20′S 149°20′E

Collingwood Bay is a bay on the coast of Oro Province, Papua New Guinea.
