= Tufi =

Town in Papua New Guinea

Coordinates: 9°05′S 149°19′E

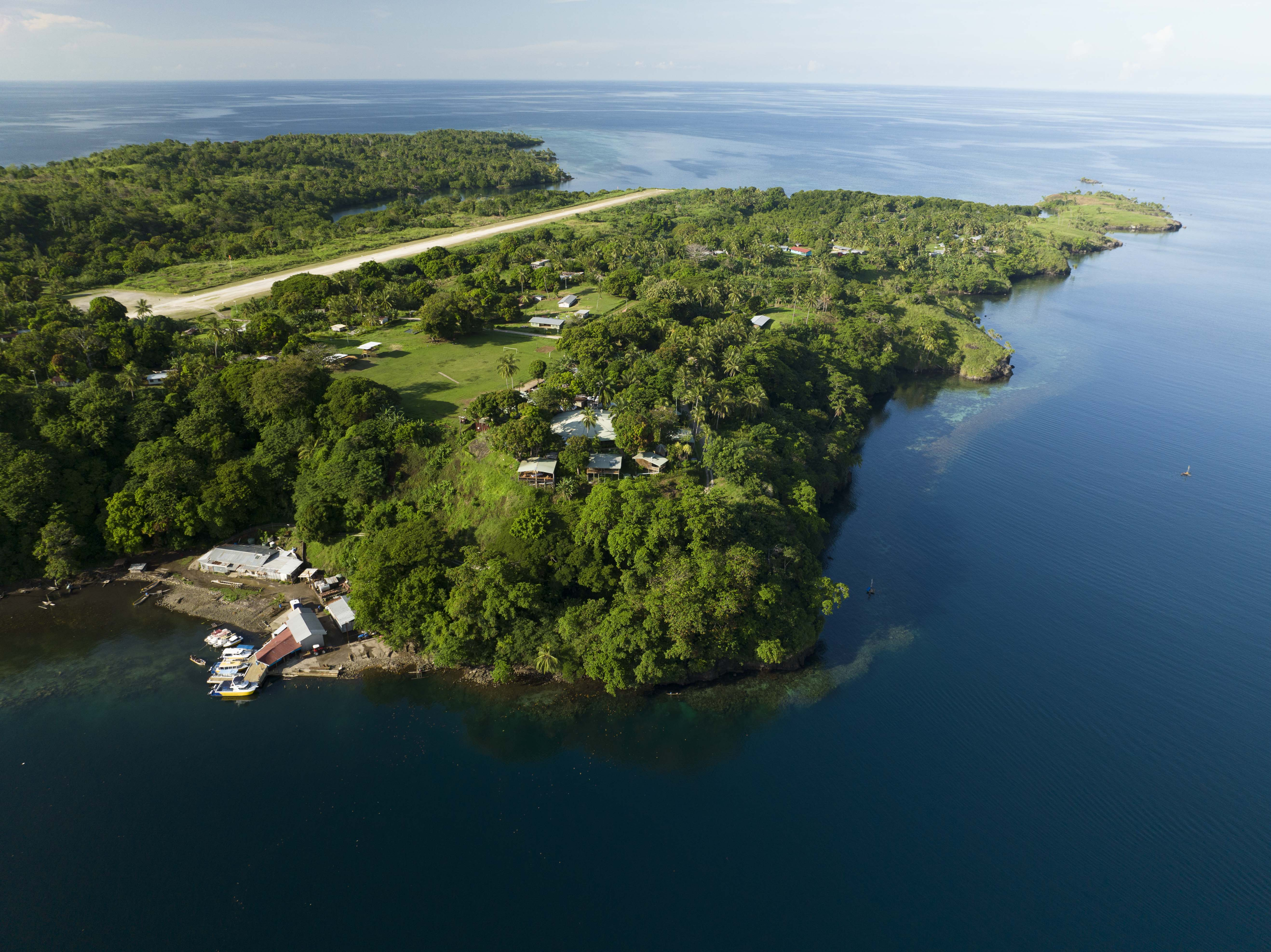
View of Tufi from the East, with wharf and airstrip.

Tufi is a town located on the south eastern peninsula of Cape Nelson, Oro Province, Papua New Guinea. Tufi is located on one of many rias, or drowned river valleys, locally referred to as 'fjords', on Cape Nelson surrounded by many uncharted reefs. The area is also famous for its production of tapa cloth.

The Tufi Dive Resort provides diving experiences of the reefs, sunken ships and aircraft. Tufi is serviced by Tufi Airport. The town is located within Tufi Rural LLG.

== History ==
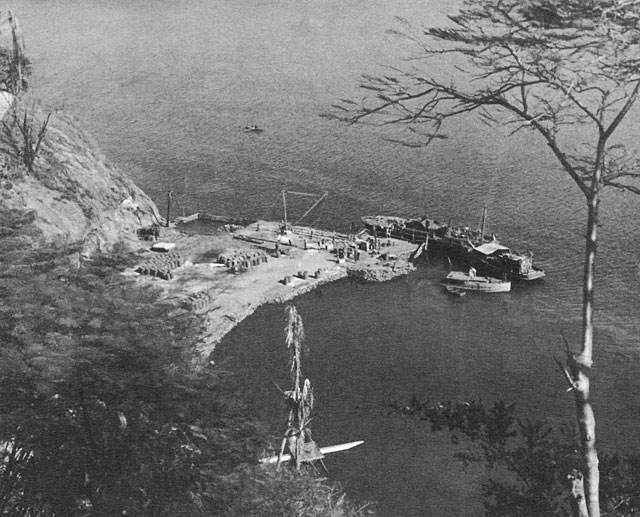
The PT-boat jetty at Tufi, 1943

Tufi was an Australian New Guinea Administrative Unit (ANGAU) Station during World War II. The United States Navy built an PT boat advanced base at Tufi which commenced operations on 20 December 1942 to support the Battle of Buna–Gona. Two PT boats, PT-67 & PT-119 caught fire while refueling at the bases wharf and sank on 17 March 1943 at the wharf along with the Australian army vessel AS 16. The PT boat base was relocated to Morobe on 20 April 1943.

== See also ==
- Tufi Rural LLG
