= Darrell Tryon =

New Zealand linguist

Darrell T. Tryon
- Born: 20 July 1942; New Zealand
- Died: 15 May 2013 (aged 70); Canberra, Australia
- Occupation: Linguist

Academic background
- Thesis: Le français parlé aux Iles Loyauté. (1963)

Academic work
- Institutions: Australian National University
- Main interests: Oceanic languages

Darrell T. Tryon (20 July 1942 – 15 May 2013) was a New Zealand-born linguist, academic, and specialist in Austronesian languages. Specifically, Tryon specialised in the study of the languages of the Pacific Islands, particularly Vanuatu, the Solomon Islands, and the French-speaking Pacific.

From 1970 to 1971, Tryon completed the first systematic study of the languages of Vanuatu, known at the time as the New Hebrides. His study, which collected a list of vocabulary words from communities throughout the islands, determined that there were more than one hundred distinct languages in Vanuatu. Tryon determined that the modern, indigenous languages of Vanuatu are part of Austronesian language family.

Tryon began to study the languages of the Solomon Islands in 1978. He was also authored works on the pidgin and creole languages of the Pacific Islands, including Pijin of the Solomon Islands and Bislama of Vanuatu.

== Early life ==
Tryon was born on 20 July 1942, in New Zealand. He studied at the University of Canterbury, where he completed a thesis on the indigenous languages of the Loyalty Islands, an archipelago of New Caledonia. He achieved fluency in French as a student and developed a fascination with the culture and history of the French regions of the South Pacific.

He moved to Australia during the mid-1960s, where he taught at Australian National University.

== Vanuatu ==
Much of Tryon's research focused on the New Hebrides, the colonial name for Vanuatu. He was a specialist on Vanuatu and its linguistic diversity. Tryon began his fieldwork in there in 1969. From 1970 to 1971, Tryon conducted the first systematic study of the more than 100 languages of Vanuatu. Rather than focusing on grammar, Tryon collected lists of vocabulary words from languages throughout the islands to determine the relationships between the languages.

His 1970–1971 study established the existence of 117 indigenous languages spoken in Vanuatu in the early 1970s. The languages of the islands were found to be members of the Austronesian language family. He used the cutoff of 81% shared cognates to differentiate a distinct language from a dialect. Some of the languages studied by Tryon have since become extinct. For example, the Sowa language, which was spoken by just 20 people living in one village near Ranwadi on Pentecost Island at the time, became extinct when the last speaker died in 2000.

In 1972, he published Pacific Linguistics volume (C-50), which contained his surveys, research and a 292-word list collected from 179 Ni-Vanuatu communities. The book also contained maps, showing where he language was spoken on each island. Tryon presented his findings at the First International Conference on Austronesian Linguistics, which was held in Honolulu, Hawaii, in 1974. Tryon's final survey on Vanuatu's 117 languages was published in 1976.

Tryon's surveys have considered to be essential to any researcher studying Vanuatu's languages. They still form the basis for much of the current knowledge on Vanuatu's linguistic heritage, according to John Lynch, a professor emeritus in linguistics at the University of the South Pacific.

Tryon headed the Vanuatu Fieldworker Programme from the early 1980s until 2009. The Vanuatu Fieldworker Programme invited men from villages throughout the country to a meeting in Port Vila once a year. Each annual meeting explored a specific cultural topic. The participants, who eventually included more than fifty men, made audio recordings of their community's cultural traditions and folklore. The researchers and the men recorded the material in Bislama. All recordings and other records from the Vanuatu Fieldworker Programme were archived at the Vanuatu Cultural Centre in Port Vila.

Much of Tryon's research from the 1970s to the 2010s continued to focus on Vanuatu. He published an extensive collection of papers and other academic research on the country and its languages.

== Solomon Islands ==
He also conducted extensive research on the languages of the Solomon Islands, beginning in 1978. Tryon and his research partner, Brian Hackman, travelled throughout the country, conducting a systematic study of the nation's languages. Their work resulted in the publication of a volume on the languages of the Solomon Islands, published in 1983.

== Later work ==
In 1995, Tryon released the Comparative Austronesian Dictionary, a five-volume set published by Mouton de Gruyter. The work was the result of years of research. Tryon wrote the introductory articles for the set. The Dictionary contains annotated wordlists for 1310 meanings, which organised semantic domain from 80 Austronesian languages, stretching from Madagascar to the Pacific, including 40 languages from the Oceania region. Each list, which was assembled by a specialist in that particular language, also included a written introduction to the language by the specialist.

He and Jean-Michel Charpentier co-authored the 2004 book, Pacific Pidgins and Creoles, which explored the history of the pidgin and creole languages in the Pacific islands.

Tryon served as the deputy director of the Research School of Pacific and Asian Studies at the Australian National University during portions of the 1990s and 2000s. He became increasingly interested both the sociology and governments of the various South Pacific nations and territories during the time, which was reflected in his research. Tryon also became a Constitutional Advisor to the government of Vanuatu.

The government of France awarded him the Legion of Honour in recognition of his contributions to French culture and language in the Pacific as well as his commitment to Australia–France relations.

== Death ==
Tryon died from melanoma in Canberra, Australia, on 15 May 2013, at the age of 70. Dignitaries in attendance at his funeral in Canberra included Acting Prime Minister of Vanuatu Ralph Regenvanu.

== Bibliography ==
- Conversational Tahitian: An introduction to the Tahitian language of French Polynesia (1970)
- The Language of Easter Island: Its Development and Eastern Polynesian Relationships (1984), co-authored with Robert Langdon
- Comparative Austronesian Dictionary (1995), five volume set published by Mouton de Gruyter
- Bonnemaison: Arts of Vanuatu (1997), co-editor with Joel Bonnemaison and Kirk Huffman
- Pacific Pidgins and Creoles (2004), co-authored with Jean-Michel Charpentier
- The Austronesians: Historical and Comparative Perspectives (2006), co-authored with Peter Bellwood and James J. Fox
- Oceanic Encounters: Exchange, Desire, Violence (2011), co-authored with Margaret Jolly and Serge Tcherkézoff
- Politics, Development and Security in Oceania (2013), co-authored with David Hegarty

Pacific Linguistics publications

- Tryon, D.T. Nengone grammar. B-6, x + 101 pages. Pacific Linguistics, The Australian National University, 1967. doi:10.15144/PL-B6
- Tryon, D.T. Dehu grammar. B-7, xii + 122 pages. Pacific Linguistics, The Australian National University, 1968. doi:10.15144/PL-B7
- Tryon, D.T. Iai grammar. B-8, xii + 137 pages. Pacific Linguistics, The Australian National University, 1968. doi:10.15144/PL-B8
- Tryon, D.T. An introduction of Maranungku (Northern Australia). B-15, x + 121 pages. Pacific Linguistics, The Australian National University, 1970. doi:10.15144/PL-B15
- Tryon, D.T. Dehu-English dictionary. C-6, vi + 142 pages. Pacific Linguistics, The Australian National University, 1967. doi:10.15144/PL-C6
- Tryon, D.T. English-Dehu dictionary. C-7, iv + 165 pages. Pacific Linguistics, The Australian National University, 1967. doi:10.15144/PL-C7
- Tryon, D.T. and Dubois, M.J. Nengone dictionary. Part I: Nengone-English. C-9, viii + 452 pages. Pacific Linguistics, The Australian National University, 1969. doi:10.15144/PL-C9
- Tryon, D.T. and Dubois, M.J. Nengone dictionary. Part II: English-Nengone. C-23, iv + 205 pages. Pacific Linguistics, The Australian National University, 1971. doi:10.15144/PL-C23
- Tryon, D.T. Daly Family languages, Australia. C-32, xviii + 322 pages. Pacific Linguistics, The Australian National University, 1974. doi:10.15144/PL-C32
- Tryon, D.T. New Hebrides languages: An internal classification. C-50, vi + 550 pages. Pacific Linguistics, The Australian National University, 1976. doi:10.15144/PL-C50
- Tryon, D.T. "The Languages of the New Hebrides: Internal and External Relationships". In Wurm, S.A. and Carrington, L. editors, Second International Conference on Austronesian Linguistics: Proceedings. C-61:877-902. Pacific Linguistics, The Australian National University, 1978. doi:10.15144/PL-C61.877
- Tryon, D.T. and Hackman, B.D. Solomon Islands languages: An internal classification. C-72, viii + 493 pages. Pacific Linguistics, The Australian National University, 1983. doi:10.15144/PL-C72
- Tryon, D.T. "Towards a classification of Solomon Islands languages". In Halim, A., Carrington, L. and Wurm, S.A. editors, Papers from the Third International Conference on Austronesian Linguistics, Vol. 1: Currents in Oceanic. C-74:97-108. Pacific Linguistics, The Australian National University, 1982. doi:10.15144/PL-C74.97
- Tryon, D.T. "The Marquesan dialects: a first approach". In Laycock, D.C. and Winter, W. editors, A World of language: Papers presented to Professor S.A. Wurm on his 65th birthday. C-100:669-681. Pacific Linguistics, The Australian National University, 1987.
- Tryon, D. "Oceanic plant names". In Pawley, A.K. and Ross, M.D. editors, Austronesian Terminologies: Continuity and change. C-127:481-510. Pacific Linguistics, The Australian National University, 1994. doi:10.15144/PL-C127.481
- Tryon, D. "Mae-Morae and the languages of Epi (Vanuatu)". In Lynch, J. and Pat, F.'A. editors, Oceanic Studies: Proceedings of the First International Conference on Oceanic Linguistics. C-133:305-318. Pacific Linguistics, The Australian National University, 1996. doi:10.15144/PL-C133.305
- Tryon, D.T. and Gly, R. Gazetteer of New Hebrides place names/Nomenclature des noms geographiques des Nouvelles-Hebrides. D-15, xxxvi + 188 pages. Pacific Linguistics, The Australian National University, 1979. doi:10.15144/PL-D15
- Tryon, D. Bislama: An Introduction to the National Language of Vanuatu. D-72, xiv + 261 pages. Pacific Linguistics, The Australian National University, 1987. doi:10.15144/PL-D72
- Tryon, D. "Ngatikese Men's Language". In Pawley, A., Ross, M. and Tryon, D. editors, The boy from Bundaberg: Studies in Melanesian linguistics in honour of Tom Dutton. PL-514:345-360. Pacific Linguistics, The Australian National University, 2001. doi:10.15144/PL-514.345
- Tryon, D. "The languages of Espiritu Santo, Vanuatu". In Bowden, J., Himmelmann, N.P. and Ross, M. editors, A journey through Austronesian and Papuan linguistic and cultural space: papers in honour of Andrew K. Pawley. PL-615:283-290. Pacific Linguistics, The Australian National University, 2010.
- Tryon, D. "The endangered languages of Vanuatu". In Senft, G. editor, Endangered Austronesian, Papuan and Australian Aboriginal languages: essays on language documentation, archiving and revitalization. PL-617:17-34. Pacific Linguistics, The Australian National University, 2010.

== See also ==
- Alexandre François
- Terry Crowley (linguist)
