= Efogi Airport =

Airport in Efogi, Central, Papua New Guinea

Coordinates: 09°09.34′S 147°39.60′E

- IATA: EFG; ICAO: AYEF

Summary
- Location: Efogi, Papua New Guinea
- Elevation AMSL: 3,800 ft / 1,158 m

Map
- Location of airport in Papua New Guinea

Runways
Direction	Length		Surface
Direction	m	ft	Surface
17/35	487	1,598
- Source: PNG Airstrip Guide

Efogi Airport is an airfield serving Efogi, in the Central Province of Papua New Guinea.
