= Popondetta Urban LLG =

Local-level government in Papua New Guinea

Popendetta Rural LLG
- Location within Papua New Guinea
- Coordinates: 8.804°S 148.251°E
- Country: Papua New Guinea
- Province: Oro Province
- Time zone: UTC+10 (AEST)

District map of Oro Province

Popendetta Rural LLG (Popondetta Rural LLG) is a local-level government (LLG) of Oro Province, Papua New Guinea.

== Wards ==
- 06. Gewoto
- 07. Sewa
- 08. Isuga
- 09. Dobuduru
- 10. Sorovi
- 11. East Ambogo
- 80. Popondetta Urban
