= Korafe language =

Trans–New Guinea language spoken in Papua New Guinea

Korafe
- Korafe-Yegha
- Gaina
- Native to: Papua New Guinea
- Region: Oro Province
- Native speakers: (1,400 Gaina and Bareji cited 1971); 3,600 Korafe and Yegha (2003)
- Language family: Trans–New Guinea: Binanderean; Korafe
- Dialects: Korafe; Yegha; Gaina; Bareji

Language codes
- ISO 639-3: Either: kpr – Korafe-Yegha gcn – Gaina-Bareji
- Glottolog: gaen1235

Korafe is a Papuan language spoken in Oro Province, in the "tail" of Papua New Guinea. It is part of the Binanderean family of the Trans–New Guinea phylum of languages. Korafe or could also be called Kailikaili, Kaire, Korafe, Korafi, Korape, and Kwarafe is a language spoken in the Oro Province more specifically in the Tufi District, and Cape Nelson Headlands.

Korafe has been heavily influenced by Oceanic languages.

== Speakers ==
For the people that lived of the Korafe language lived with three main principles:

1. Self-sustaining economy
2. Responsibilities and such go beyond one generation and can be passed down to one's children and so on and so forth
3. Belief in magic powers as well as a spirit world that are involved in a good well being for the community

The Korafe people are a people that live in a mainly tribal manner as they wear very outlandish headgear as well as many other types of jewelry not commonly found anywhere else. The people were rich in culture and that can be seen within the complexity in the Korafe Language.

== Phonology ==
=== Consonants ===
Consonants
	Bilabial	Dental/Alveolar/Postveolar	Palatal	Velar
Plosive	b	t d		k g
Nasal	m	n		
Tap or Flap		r		
Fricative	f v	s	ç <j>	γ <h>
Approximant			j <y>	

The orthography is written in angular brackets where it differs from the IPA.

Vowels
	front	central	back
Open		a	
Mid	e̞		o̞
Close	i		u

=== Stress ===
- Stress on syllables comes on different syllables depending on the amount of syllables
- The accent mark also helps to show the location of said syllable that is being stressed
  - The first syllable is stressed when the word itself has 2 syllables
    - Example: gháka ‘canoe’ jáinjain ‘chirp of a cricket’
  - The second syllable is stressed when the word itself has more than 2 syllables
    - Example: genémbo ‘man’, gegénembo ‘men’, tatárigho ‘echo’, ufóngufongu ‘iguana’
  - Also the first syllable is stressed when it uses the syllable pattern (C)VV(V)

== Orthography ==
Uppercase letters	A	B	D	E	F	G	Gh	I	J	K	M	N	O	R	S	T	U	V	Y
Lowercase letters	a	b	d	e	f	g	gh	I	j	k	m	n	o	r	s	t	u	v	y
IPA	/ɑ/	/b/	/d/	/e/	/ɸ/	/ɡ/	/ɣ/	/i/	/ʤ/	/k/	/m/	/n/	/o/	/ɾ/	/s/	/t/	/u/	/β/	/j/

== Grammar ==
The Korafe language has primarily SOV or Subject-Object-Verb word order. An example of the use of Subject-Object-Verb word order is shown below:

ere-gov-ena
REP-plant.vs1-PRES.1S.FN
‘I am planting’

=== Pronouns ===
	I	you	he, she, it	you(plural)/they
Korafe	na	ni	nu	ne

=== Interrogatives ===
	who	what	which	how
Korafe	ave/mave	re	ningi	ninge

=== Stems and Verbs ===
For stem verbs I the structure of that verb would be said root word followed by -e, -i, or -u.

sé íti gémbu
say.I cook.I write.I

Stem II verbs are normally somewhat close to Stem I verbs but with a few changes whether it be a vowel shift, reduplication etc. Normally, removes one of the vowels which are most likely -u, or -i

si itutu gefu
say.II cook.II write.II

Verbs follow serial verb construction, or basically using more than 1 verb next to each other in a clause.

si-r-ur-ono s gefu-sira
ay.II-EPEN-IPF-SIM.lR.l S.DS write.II-DP.3S.FN
'while I will be speaking' 'he wrote'

==== Non-Finite Verb Forms ====
===== Positive Deverbals =====
When creating a positive deverbal it is a root word followed by the suffix -ari.

s-ari it-ari gemb-ari
say.I-DvB cook.l-DVB write.I-DVB
{'to speak/speaking'} {'to cook/cooking'} {'to write/writing'}

===== Negative Deverbals =====
Negative versions of Positive Deverbals are the same structurally but just has a different suffix which for negatives is -ae

s-ae it-ae gemb-ae
say.l-not.do cook.l-not.do write.l-not.do
{'not saying'} {'not cooking'} {'not writing'}

=== Verb Formation ===
In Korafe only one heavy syllable is allowed (vv in the Rhyme)

Almost all imperfective verbs will use the -ere rules

==== -ere replacement rules ====
1. When the verb is a stem II verb and also follows any of the following order V, CV, VCV, CVCV, VNCV, CVNCV, then the -ere will be put right before the stem word

ere-gefu ere-bundi ere-oji
IPF-write.TI IPF-bind.II IPF-butcher.I1
{'be writing'} {'be binding'} {'be butchering'}

2. Verb is stem two but have longer configurations such as VCVCV, CVCVCV, VNCVCV, CYNCVCV. In this case the -ere rule applies by having the root word followed by -ere.

{teteru-ere-u t} undudu-ere-u
eter-er-u undud-er-u
enter.II-IPF-do.lI.IMP {nurture.11-IPF-do.II'! MP}
{'be entering'} {'be nurturing'}

==== Nominal and Verb Combinations ====
Some phrases and expressions can be made with the use nominals and verbs together.

Examples using -e,-se,-ghe
Korafe N(N)+V:	Literal rendering	Free translation
isoro e	war make	'wage war on enemies'
saramana e	work do	'work'
dubo mema e	neck pain do	'feel sad, grieve'
Baiboro se	Bible say	'promise on the Bible'
kori se	shout say	'shout'
tirotaroghe	ripples do again	' slosh, ripple, lap'
(bain) bainghe	nod do again	'nod off, bow head'

=== The Epenthetic Insertion Rules ===
The epenthetic rules are used in order to avoid changing the meaning of words that would be changed from suffixes.

==== Epenthetic r-insertion (imperfective) ====
For r-insertion it is normally used between the stem II verb and the -uru

gefu-uru $\rightarrow$ gefu-r-uru
write.I1-IPF $\rightarrow$ write.II-EPEN-IPF
'be writing while'

===== r-Insertion for one syllable (Ci or Cu stems) =====
For this case an r is inserted between the stem II verb and the suffix -arira (will)

barija di-arira $\rightarrow$ barija di-r-arira,
rainfall rain-F.3S.FN $\rightarrow$ rainfall rain-EPEN-F.3S.FN
'it will rain'

=== Nouns ===
==== Noun Phrases ====
Structure of Noun Phrases
Pre-head	Head	Post-Head
possessor	noun/nominal compound	(qualifier) (quantifier) (determiner)
