= Zia language =

Trans–New Guinea language of Papua New Guinea

Zia
- Pronunciation: [d̪ia]
- Native to: Papua New Guinea
- Region: lower Waria Valley, Morobe Province
- Ethnicity: Zia
- Native speakers: (4,500 cited 2000)
- Language family: Trans–New Guinea: Binanderean; Zia–Yekora; Zia
- Dialects: Zia; Mawae
- Writing system: Latin

Language codes
- ISO 639-3: zia
- Glottolog: ziaa1250

Zia is a Papuan language spoken in the Lower Waria Valley in Morobe Province, Papua New Guinea. It is part of the Binandere subgroup of the Trans–New Guinea phylum of languages (Ross, 2005).

== Orthography ==
Uppercase letters	A	B	D	E	G	I	K	M	N	O	P	R	S	T	U	W	Y	Z
Lowercase letters	a	b	d	e	g	i	k	m	n	o	p	r	s	t	u	w	y	z
IPA	/ɑ/	/b/	/d/	/ɛ/	/ɡ/	/i/	/k/	/m/	/n/	/ɔ/	/p/	/ɾ/	/s/	/t̪/	/u/	/w/	/j/	/dz/
