= Safia Rural LLG =

Local-level government in Papua New Guinea

- Country: Papua New Guinea
- Province: Oro Province
- Time zone: UTC+10 (AEST)

District map of Oro Province

Safia Rural LLG is a local-level government (LLG) of Oro Province, Papua New Guinea.

== Wards ==
- 01. Namudi (Nawaru language speakers)
- 02. Sinua
- 03. Moro
- 04. Jari
- 05. Tuturawaru/Bibira No.2
- 06. Safia
- 07. Obea
- 08. Foru
- 09. Karisoa
- 10. Kinjaki
- 11. Embesa
- 12. Koira
- 13. Domara
