= Koiarian languages =

Family of Trans–New Guinea languages

Koiarian
- Koiari – Managalas Plateau
- Geographic distribution: Southeastern peninsula of Papua New Guinea: Central Province and Oro Province
- Linguistic classification: Trans–New Guinea: Papuan Peninsula; Owen Stanley Range; Koiarian
- Subdivisions: Koiari; Baraic (Managalas Plateau)

Language codes
- Glottolog: koia1260

The Koiarian languages /kɔɪˈɑːriən/ Koiari are a small family of Trans–New Guinea languages spoken in the "Bird's Tail" (southeastern peninsula) of New Guinea. They are classified within the Southeast Papuan branch of Trans–New Guinea.

== Languages ==
The languages are:

- Koiaric branch (Koiari): Grass Koiari, Mountain Koiari–Koitabu
- Baraic branch (Managalas Plateau): Barai–Namiae, Ese (Managalasi), Ömie

Dutton (2010) classifies the Koiarian languages as:

- Baraic
  - Ömie
  - Barai–Managalasi (incl. Namiae)
- Koiaric
  - Mountain Koiari
  - Koita – Grass Koiari

== Proto-language ==
=== Pronouns ===
Usher (2020) reconstructs the pronouns as:

	sg	pl
1	*na	*no
2	*a	*ja
3	*aɸu	*[i/e]abu

=== Vocabulary ===
The following basic vocabulary words of Proto-Koiarian and other lower-level reconstructions are from the Trans-New Guinea database:

gloss	Proto-Koiarian	Proto-Koiariac	Proto-Baraic
head		*kina	
hair	*fómo		
ear			*gada
eye	*ni		
nose	*uri		
tooth			*gubai
tongue			*bitarV
leg			*díʔ-
louse	*ʔumu		
dog		*to	*(ʔ,k)uo
pig		*ofo	*mafV
bird	*ugu[fa]		
egg	*uni		
blood	*taɣo		
bone			*(ʔ)adV
skin	*vata		
breast	*amu		*m(u,o)sV
tree	*idí		
man		*ata	*baru
woman	*maɣina	*nigi	
sun		*vani	*maja-; *ve
moon		*bata	
water			*[i]do
fire	*vené		
stone	*muni		*Umari
road, path		*ɣuma	
name	*ifí		
eat	*i-		
one	*(i,o)gau		*Ogonu
two		*abu(t)i	*inoki

== Evolution ==
Koiarian reflexes of proto-Trans-New Guinea (pTNG) etyma are:

Koiari language:

- muka ‘lump’ < *maŋgV ‘round object’
- uni ‘egg’ < *mun(a,i,u)ka
- idu ‘tree’ < *inda
- iya ‘cassowary’ < *ku(y)a
- karika ‘dry’ < *(ŋg,k)atata
- muni ‘stone < *(na)muna
- nana ‘older same-sex sibling’ < *nan(a,i)
- u-tuvu ‘ashes’ < *kambu-sumbu

Managalasi language:

- ata ‘bone’ < *kondaC
- muka ‘lump’ < *maŋgV ‘round object’
- iha ‘name’ < *imbi
- uma ‘louse’ < *iman
- uka ‘bird’ < *yaka
- tuua ‘short’ < *tukumba[C]
- muna ‘stone’ < *(na)muna
- ija ‘tree’ < *inda
- otoka ‘knee’ < *(k,ŋg)atuk
- kora ‘dry’ < *(ŋg,k)atata

== Phonotactics ==
Like the Binanderean languages, Barai and other Koiarian languages only allow for open syllables and do not allow final CVC.
