= Koita language =

Koiarian language spoken in Papua New Guinea

Koitabu
- Region: Papua New Guinea
- Ethnicity: Koita
- Native speakers: (2,700 cited 2000)
- Language family: Trans–New Guinea: Koiarian; Koiaric; Koitabu

Language codes
- ISO 639-3: kqi
- Glottolog: koit1244
- ELP: Koitabu
- Koita is classified as Vulnerable by the UNESCO Atlas of the World's Languages in Danger.

Koitabu, or Koita, is a Papuan language of Papua New Guinea in the Port Moresby area.
