= Tamata Rural LLG =

Local-level government in Papua New Guinea

- Location within Papua New Guinea
- Coordinates: 8.31°S 147.80°E
- Country: Papua New Guinea
- Province: Oro Province
- Time zone: UTC+10 (AEST)

District map of Oro Province

Tamata Rural LLG is a local-level government (LLG) of Oro Province, Papua New Guinea.

== Wards ==
- 01. Huratan
- 02. Oitatande
- 03. Kikinonda
- 04. Korisata
- 05. Utukiari
- 06. Kurereda
- 07. Jino
- 08. Sia
- 09. Manau
- 10. Deboin
- 11. Kataure
- 12. Tubi
- 13. Aindi
- 14. Nindewari
- 15. Ewore
- 16. Bovera
- 17. Tave
