= Port Moresby Nature Park =

Nature Park in Port Moresby

Port Moresby Nature Park Located in capital city Papua New Guinea, this park is accredited by the Australian zoo and aquarium association. It is a facility that promotes animal care, conservation, and education.It offers botanical, zoological, and nature experiences across its 30-acre expanse.

Port Moresby Nature Park is important to wildlife conservation in the region. The park provides a safe environment for animals and raises awareness about the importance of biodiversity conservation. Visitors can experience exhibitions and educational programs designed to foster a deep appreciation for nature and inspire action.

== Park ==
This park is home to a diverse range of wildlife, including native species such as tree-kangaroos, cassowaries, and crocodiles. It welcomes over 150,000 visitors annually, including 30,000 students participating in educational and holiday programs. The park is dedicated to the conservation of Papua New Guinea's unique flora and fauna.This park is home to over 550 native animals, including birds of paradise, tree-kangaroos, cassowaries, wallabies, reptiles, and countless species of parrots and other birds.

The Centre for Species Survival (CSS) for Papua New Guinea, hosted by Port Moresby Nature Park, has been officially launched. This initiative is a joint effort between Port Moresby Nature Park and the IUCN Species Survival Commission.

Partially funded by the Cologne Zoological Garden in Germany, the ExxonMobil PNG LNG Education Zone initiative was announced by Nature Park CEO John Paul Houston, who highlighted the importance of involving local people and networks in nature conservation within Papua New Guinea.

== See also ==
- Port Moresby
- Papua New Guinea
