= Guhu-Samane language =

Trans–New Guinea language

Guhu-Samane
- Region: Papua New Guinea
- Native speakers: 12,800 (2014)
- Language family: Trans–New Guinea: Binanderean; Guhu-Samane
- Dialects: Sekare

Language codes
- ISO 639-3: ghs
- Glottolog: guhu1244

Guhu-Samane, also known as Bia, Mid-Waria, Muri, Paiawa, Tahari, is a divergent Trans–New Guinea language that is related to the Binanderean family in the classification of Malcolm Ross (2005).

The divergence of Guhu-Samane from other Binanderean languages may be due to extensive historical contact with Oceanic languages such as Numbami.

== Dialects ==
Smallhorn (2011:131) gives the following dialects:

- Kipu (most widely spoken)
- Bapi
- Garaina
- Sekare
- Sinaba

The dialect differences are principally lexical, but two voiced obstruents also show regular variants. The coronal obstruent is realized as /dz/ upriver in Bapi and Garaina, /d/ downriver to Asama, and /j/ farther downriver in Papua. The voiced bilabial is realized as /b/ inland but as /w/ at the coast (Sinaba and Paiawa) (Handman 2015:102).
