= Baruga language =

Trans–New Guinea language spoken in Papua New Guinea

Baruga
- Bareji
- Native to: Papua New Guinea
- Region: Oro Province
- Native speakers: (2,500 cited 2000–2003)
- Language family: Trans–New Guinea: Binanderean; Baruga
- Dialects: Tafota; Daghoro; Bareji; Mado

Language codes
- ISO 639-3: Either: bjz – Baruga dgx – Doghoro
- Glottolog: baru1268

Baruga, also known ambiguously as Bareji, is a Papuan language spoken in Oro Province, in the "tail" of Papua New Guinea. The four rather divergent dialects are Tafota, Daghoro, Bareji, Mado. They are part of the Binanderean family of the Trans–New Guinea phylum of languages.

== Phonology ==
=== Consonants ===
		Labial	Alveolar	Palatal	Velar
Nasal		m	n		
Plosive/ Affricate	voiceless		t		k
Plosive/ Affricate	voiced	b	d	dʒ	ɡ
Plosive/ Affricate	prenasal	ᵐb	ⁿd	ⁿdʒ	ᵑɡ
Fricative	voiceless	ɸ	s		
Fricative	voiced	β			ɣ
Flap			ɾ		
Approximant				j	

- /t, k/ may also be frequently aspirated [tʰ, kʰ].
- /β, ɾ/ may also be heard as [w, l].

=== Vowels ===
	Front	Central	Back
High	i, ĩ		u, ũ
Mid	e, ẽ		o, õ
Low		a, ã	

Nasalized vowels are also present.

- Vowels /e, a, o/ may have allophones as [ɛ, ɑ, ɔ].
