= Orokaiva language =

Binanderean language of Papua New Guinea

Orokaiva
- Orokaivic
- Native to: Papua New Guinea
- Region: Oro Province
- Ethnicity: Orokaiva
- Native speakers: (47,000 cited 2000 census – 2007)
- Language family: Trans–New Guinea: Binanderean; Orokaiva

Language codes
- ISO 639-3: Variously: okv – Orokaiva hkk – Hunjara aez – Aeka
- Glottolog: orok1268
- IETF: okv

Orokaiva is a Papuan language spoken in the "tail" of Papua New Guinea.

== Varieties ==
Orokaiva is spoken in 200 villages around Popondetta in Oro Province.

Hunjara is spoken in Kokoda Rural LLG of Oro Province.

Aeka is spoken in Tamata Rural LLG of Oro Province.

== Phonology ==
=== Consonants ===
		Labial	Alveolar	Velar	Glottal
Nasal		m	n	ŋ	
Plosive	voiceless	p	t	k	
Plosive	voiced	b	d	ɡ	
Affricate			d͡z		
Fricative			s		h

- Voiced stops /b, d, ɡ/ may fluctuate to prenasalized stop sounds [ᵐb, ⁿd, ᵑɡ] in word-initial position. The prenasalized stop sounds are also heard among the voiced stops when in post-nasal sequences.
- /b/ can be heard as [β] in intervocalic positions, and may also be heard as a voiced bilabial rounded fricative [β̹] when before /a/ in intervocalic positions..
- /d/ may occur as flap sounds [ɾ, ɽ, ɺ] in free fluctuation in word-medial positions, except when after a nasal sound.
- /d͡z/ may have fluctuating allophones of [d͡ʒ, ʒ] occurring in syllable-initial positions.
- Word-final nasal sounds /-n, -ŋ/ when after a vowel, may result in vowel nasalization [Ṽ].

=== Vowels ===
	Front	Central	Back
High	i		u
Mid	e		o
Low		a	

- Sounds [i, u, a] can have allophones [ɪ, ʊ, ʌ].
