= Tufi Rural LLG =

Local-level government in Papua New Guinea

Tufi Rural LLG Cape Nelson Rural LLG
- Country: Papua New Guinea
- Province: Oro Province
- Time zone: UTC+10 (AEST)

District map of Oro Province

Tufi Rural LLG (formerly Cape Nelson Rural LLG) is a local-level government (LLG) of Oro Province, Papua New Guinea. The Onjob language is spoken in two villages within the LLG.

== Wards ==
- 01. Kewansapsap
- 02. Marua
- 03. Uiaku
- 04. Ganjiga
- 05. Rainu
- 06. Koreaf
- 07. Ajoa
- 08. Itoto
- 09. Giriwa
- 10. Managa
- 11. Jebo
- 12. Baga
- 13. Kwave
- 14. Sefoa
- 15. Sinei
- 16. Berebona 1 & 2
- 17. Ako
- 21. Guruguru
- 23. Gobe
- 85. Tufi Govt. Station
