= Port Moresby General Hospital =

- Main entrance

Geography
- Location: Papua New Guinea
- Coordinates: 09°28′34″S 147°11′43″E

Services
- Beds: 600

Links
- Website: www.pomgen.gov.pg
- Lists: Hospitals in Papua New Guinea

Port Moresby General Hospital (POMGEH) is the largest hospital in Papua New Guinea. It is located in Korobosea, a suburb of Port Moresby in the National Capital District. A major teaching hospital, it is adjacent to the University of Papua New Guinea's School of Medicine and Health Sciences.

== History ==
The first hospital in Port Moresby was established by the Australian government in 1941 to serve the war effort. Later, in 1942, it was moved to King Hollow and then to the base camp. It was renamed the Australian Camp Hospital. After the Japanese occupation in 1943, it was expanded to the 128th Regiment as a general hospital. In 1944, it left New Guinea. It moved to New South Wales.

== Port Moresby General hospital ==
Since 1957was founded as a hospital with a total of 350 beds in Port Moresby.

== JICA ==
At the request of the Government of Papua New Guinea, the government of Japan has decided to conduct a basic design study on the project. for the redevelopment of Port Moresby General Hospital and the Japan International cooperation Agency (JICA) sent to Papua New Guinea a study team headed by Dr Naruo Uehara, medical Official of the department of international corporation, national medical Centre hospital, ministry of health and welfare from May to June 1988. The study report, its facilities have been extended and remodeled, but not under a comprehensive long-term policy. Furthermore, the Walter Strong Wing, a wooden building constructed in 1957, was constructed as a building to last 25 years.

== 1988 ==
The greater part of the land is High- humidity tropical zone. The population was estimated at about 3,580,000 n 1988.

== NDP ==
in 1974 the Government formulated Developmental programmer for the public. " The Eight- point improvement plan" and the national objectives and Guideline under the National Development programes.

== Services ==
PAPUA, New Guinea (Aug. 6, 2008) Dr. Harold Forney, a member of an international relief team working with Pacific Partnership, studies a patient's X-ray during a surgical screening at Port Moresby General Hospital

Cmdr. Kevin Bach consults a patient at Port Moresby General Hospital.

Health services provided by POMGEN are as shown below.

| Departments/units | services |
|---|---|
| Internal medicine | |
| Surgery | |
| Obstetrics and Gynecology | |
| Dermatology | |
| Anesthesiology | |
| ENT | |
| Radiology | X- ray |
| Psychiatry | |
| Cancer center | |
| Iintensive care unit | |
| Sexually transmitted Diseases | |
| Nutritional education | |
| Primary health service | |
| Pathology | |
| Dentistry | |
| Rehabilitation | Physiotherapy occupational therapy |
| Pharmacy | |
| Wards | |
| unit | Tuberculosis |
| Teaching hospital | |
| blood bank | |

Acceptance of referral patients and management of overseas treatment, Training medical care - related engineers and technicians

port moresby general hospital gynecology block

general hospital other entrance
