= Ömie language =

Baraic language spoken in Papua New Guinea

Ömie
- Region: Papua New Guinea
- Ethnicity: Aomie
- Native speakers: (1,200 cited 2000 census)
- Language family: Trans–New Guinea: Koiarian; Baraic; Ömie

Language codes
- ISO 639-3: aom
- Glottolog: omie1241

Ömie (Aomie) is a language of Papua New Guinea. Half of speakers are monolingual.
