= Southeast Papuan languages =

Language group of New Guinea

Southeast Papuan
- Bird's Tail; Papuan Peninsula
- Geographic distribution: Southeastern peninsula of New Guinea
- Linguistic classification: Trans–New Guinea: Southeast Papuan
- Subdivisions: Koiarian; Kwalean; Manubaran; Yareban–Mailuan; Dagan

Language codes
- ISO 639-3: –
- Glottolog: None
- Map: The Southeast Papuan languages of New Guinea The Southeast Papuan languages Other Trans–New Guinea languages Other Papuan languages Austronesian languages Uninhabited

The Southeast Papuan or Papuan Peninsula ("Bird's Tail") languages are a group of half a dozen small families of Papuan languages in the "Bird's Tail" (southeastern peninsula) of New Guinea that are part of the Trans–New Guinea (TNG) phylum.

== Languages ==
The languages are as follows:

- Dagan (Meneao Range)
- Owen Stanley Range
  - Koiarian (Koiari – Managalas Plateau)
  - Kwalean (Humene–Uare)
  - Manubaran (Mount Brown)
  - Mailu–Yareban
    - Yareban (Musa River)
    - Bauwaki
    - Mailuan (Cloudy Bay)

They have in common ya for 'you' (plural) instead of proto-TNG *gi.

== Pronouns ==
Usher (2020) reconstructs the pronouns as:

	Owen Stanley		Meneao (Dagan)	
	sg	pl	sg	pl
1	*na	?	*n[e/a]	*nu
2	*ga	*ja	*g[e/a]	*j[e/a]
3	*e (?)	*ie (?)	*me	*mV
