= Oro Bay Rural LLG =

Local-level government in Papua New Guinea

- Location within Papua New Guinea
- Coordinates: 8.64565°S 148.30342°E
- Country: Papua New Guinea
- Province: Oro Province
- Time zone: UTC+10 (AEST)

District map of Oro Province

Oro Bay Rural LLG is a local-level government (LLG) of Oro Province, Papua New Guinea.

== Wards ==
- 01. Sariri
- 02. Gunimba
- 03. Jegerakambo
- 04. Emo
- 05. Banderi
- 06. Waiwa
- 07. Beama
- 08. Baberada
- 09. Dombada
- 10. Hanakiro
- 11. Kararata
- 12. Dobuduru
- 13. Barisari
- 14. Siremi
- 15. Buna
- 16. Killerton
- 17. Otobefari
- 18. Konje
- 19. Kausada
- 20. Jinanga
- 21. Bakumbari
- 22. Batari
- 23. Oure
- 24. Aure
- 25. Dewatutu
- 26. Bindari
