= Kokoda Rural LLG =

Local-level government in Papua New Guinea

- Location within Papua New Guinea
- Coordinates: 8.978°S 147.874°E
- Country: Papua New Guinea
- Province: Oro Province
- Time zone: UTC+10 (AEST)

District map of Oro Province

Kokoda Rural LLG is a local-level government (LLG) of Oro Province, Papua New Guinea.

== Wards ==
- 01. Asimba
- 02. Kovelo
- 04. Saga
- 06. Iora Lss Blocks
- 07. Kebara
- 08. Abuari
- 09. Alola
- 10. Waju
- 11. Hangiri
- 12. Ambene
- 13. Ilimo
- 14. Hamara
- 15. Ajeka
- 16. Evasusu
- 17. Asisi
- 18. Sairope
- 19. Putembo
- 20. Asafa
- 21. Wora
- 22. Emo
- 23. Awoma
- 24. Kovio
- 81. Kokoda Urban
- 82. Mamba Urban
