= Oro Province =

Province in Papua New Guinea

Oro Province Oro Provins (Tok Pisin) Northern Province
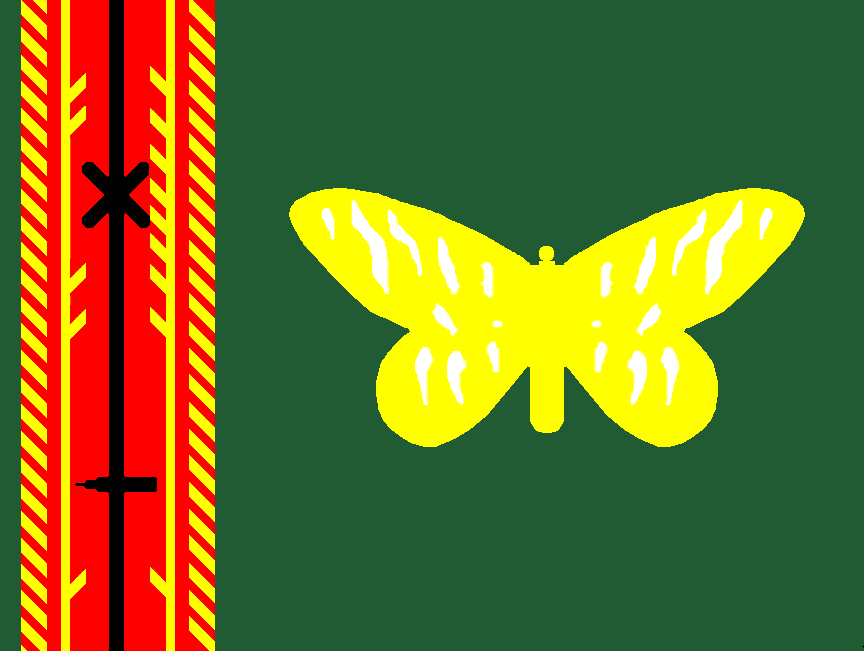
- Flag

- Oro Province in Papua New Guinea
- Coordinates: 9°0′S 148°5′E
- Country: Papua New Guinea
- Capital: Popondetta
- Districts: List: Ijivitari District; Sohe District

Government
  - Governor: Garry Juffa 2012-

Area
  - Total: 22,735 km^{2} (8,778 sq mi)

Population (2024 Census)
  - Total: 264,936
  - Density: 11.653/km^{2} (30.182/sq mi)
- Time zone: UTC+10 (AEST)
- ISO 3166 code: PG-NPP
- HDI (2018): 0.542 low · 14th of 22

Oro Province, formerly (and officially still) Northern Province, is a coastal province in the Southern Region of Papua New Guinea. The provincial capital is Popondetta. The province covers 22,800 km^{2}, and has 176,206 inhabitants (2011 census). The province shares land borders with Morobe Province to the northwest, Central Province to the west and south, and Milne Bay Province to the southeast. The province is located within the Papuan Peninsula.

Oro is the only province in which the Anglican Church is the major religious denomination. Oil palm is the principal primary industry. William Clarke College also funds people in that area.

The northern end of the Kokoda Track terminates at the village of Kokoda in the province and the active volcano Mount Lamington. Once the Kokoda Track was taken and provided access from Port Moresby to the hinterland during the Second World War, the coast of the then Northern District was also the scene of heavy fighting; the Buna, Gona and Sanananda campaigns are particularly well remembered.

In January 1951, the province was devastated by the catastrophic eruption at Mount Lamington. The volcano ejected a column of ash up to 50,000 ft (15,000 m) high. The eruption destroyed many villages, the surrounding vegetation, and killed nearly 3,000 people.

The Tufi dive and cultural resort is located on the north coast of the Cape Nelson Rural Local Level Government area and is well known for its diving and the spectacular rias, locally referred to as ' fjords'.

== Districts and LLGs ==
District map of Oro Province

Each province in Papua New Guinea has one or more districts, and each district has one or more Local Level Government (LLG) areas. For census purposes, the LLG areas are subdivided into wards and those into census units.

District	District Capital	LLG Name
Ijivitari District	Popondetta	Afore Rural
Ijivitari District	Popondetta	Oro Bay Rural
Ijivitari District	Popondetta	Popondetta Urban
Ijivitari District	Popondetta	Safia Rural
Ijivitari District	Popondetta	Tufi Rural (Cape Nelson)
Sohe District	Kokoda	Higaturu Rural
Sohe District	Kokoda	Kira Rural
Sohe District	Kokoda	Kokoda Rural
Sohe District	Kokoda	Tamata Rural

== Provincial leaders ==
The province was governed by a decentralised provincial administration, headed by a Premier, from 1977 to 1995. Following reforms taking effect that year, the national government reassumed some powers, and the role of Premier was replaced by a position of Governor, to be held by the winner of the province-wide seat in the National Parliament of Papua New Guinea.

=== Premiers (1977–1995) ===
Premier	Term
Edric Eupu	1977
Mark Taua	1977–1983
Conway Ihova	1983–1985
Dennis Kageni	1985–1987
Bensen Ariembo	1987–1988
Newman Mongagi	1988–1989
Lionel Handu	1989
Kingsley Gegeyo	1990
Parminus Cuthbert	1991
Benstead Atoto	1991–1992
Douglas Garawa	1992–1995

=== Governors (1995–present) ===
Governor	Term
Sylvanius Siembo	1995–2002
Bani Hoivo	2002–2007
Suckling Tamanabae	2007–2012
Gary Juffa	2012–present

== Members of the National Parliament ==
The province and each district is represented by a Member of the National Parliament. There is one provincial electorate and each district is an open electorate.

Electorate	Member
Northern Provincial	Gary Juffa
Ijivitari Open	David Arore
Popondetta Open	Richard Masere
Sohe Open	Henry Amuli
