= Massep language =

Foja Range language spoken in Indonesia

Massep
- Wotaf
- Native to: Indonesia
- Region: Papua: Sarmi Regency, West Coast District, north coast (Masep village); also west of Sarmi near Apauwar River
- Ethnicity: 85 (2000)
- Native speakers: (25 cited 2000)
- Language family: Northwest Papuan?: Foja Range; Kwerbic; Massep

Language codes
- ISO 639-3: mvs
- Glottolog: mass1263
- ELP: Masep
- Coordinates: 1.75°S 138.29°E

Massep (Masep, Potafa, Wotaf) is a poorly documented Papuan language spoken by fewer than 50 people in the single village of Masep in West Pantai District, Sarmi Regency, Papua. Despite the small number of speakers, however, language use is vigorous. It is surrounded by the Kwerba languages, namely Airoran and Samarokena.

== Classification ==
Clouse, Donohue, and Ma (2002) did not notice connections to any other language family. Ethnologue, Glottolog, and Foley (2018) list it as a language isolate. Usher classifies it as Greater Kwerbic. The pronouns are not dissimilar from those of Trans–New Guinea languages, but Massep is geographically distant from that family.

== Phonology ==
Consonants:

	t	c	k
			kʷ
			ᵑɡ
ɸ	s	ʃ	
β			ɣ
m	n	ɲ	
	r		
w		j	

Some probable consonant leniting sound changes from pre-Massep proposed by Foley (2018):

- *p > ɸ
- *b > β
- *d > r
- *k > ɣ (perhaps partially)

Vowels:

i	u
e	o
a	

== Pronouns ==
Pronouns are:

	sg	pl
1	ka	nyi
2	gu	je
3	evi	ive

== Morphology ==
Massep case suffixes as quoted by Foley (2018) from Clouse (2002):

suffix	case
-o ~ -u ~ -a	accusative
-ɣoke	dative
-aveno	instrumental
-meno	associative
-(a)vri	locative
-ni	allative
-a	temporal

== Sentences ==
Massep sentences as quoted by Foley (2018) from Clouse (2002):

ka icin-o fartasi unu-ɣoke
1SG stone-ACC throw dog-DAT
'I threw a stone at the dog.'

je saremna yaf-avri
2PL sit house-LOC
'You (pl.) sat in the house.'

gu ko-war-emon
2SG 1SG.OBJ-see-SG.TNS
'You see me.'

Word order is SOV.
