= Airoran people =

Ethnic group in Indonesia

Adora, Iriemkena, Sasawa

Total population
- 700–1,000 (2002)

Regions with significant populations
- Indonesia (Sarmi)

Languages
- Airoran, Sasawa, Papuan Malay, and Indonesian

Religion
- Christianity (mainly Protestantism)

Related ethnic groups
- Isirawa • Masep • Yoke

The Airoran people are an ethnic group of the Banso peoples, inhabiting the western region of the Apauwar River, including parts of Sarmi Regency, Indonesia. They speak various languages including Airoran and Sasawa, all of which belong to the Airoran language family.

== Distribution ==
The Airoran people originally lived along the Apauwar River and in the hills between the river and Lake Rombebai. Recently, one group was relocated to the coast at the mouth of the Apauwar River. However, the people still depend on the hinterland for their food and livelihood.

The residents of Subu, one of Airoran's villages, have very positive feelings towards outsiders because of their experiences in the mid-1970s with the Hurd family who lived there.

The Airoran residential area can be reached by motorboat from the town of Sarmi in about six hours. It's a three-day walking trip from Sarmi, but walking seems to be the common way to get there, this is the coastal village of Subu at the mouth of the Apauwar River. Inland villages can also be reached from Subu by canoe or from the Aurimi airstrip in the Kwerba area, a week-long journey down the Apauwar River.

== Population ==
The most recent population estimate for the Airoran people is 400 (De Vries, 1991), but this figure may be an underestimate. The Airoran people has three main villages, but there appears to be a large number of people who do not live in villages. The number of Airoran people likely ranges from 700 to 1,000.

== See also ==
- Indigenous people of New Guinea
- Indonesian Papuans
- Airoran language
