= Kwerbic languages =

Kwerbic
- Greater Kwerba; West Foja Range
- Geographic distribution: New Guinea
- Linguistic classification: Northwest Papuan?: Foja Range (Tor–Kwerba); Kwerbic
- Subdivisions: Kwerba; Isirawa; Kapauri–Sause; Masep

Language codes
- Glottolog: kwer1242

The Kwerbic, or Greater Kwerba, languages are a family of just under a dozen Papuan languages spoken in Indonesia.

== Classification ==
The Kwerba family is clearly established. Its closest relative appears to be Isirawa. Mawes is added by Ross (2005), but not retained by Usher; Isirawa was rejected by Ross, but retained by Usher and by Donohue (2002). Usher also adds Kapauri–Sause.

Capell (1962) proposed placing Kwerba and Isirawa in a Dani–Kwerba proposal, which was retained in Stephen Wurm's 1975 Trans–New Guinea phylum. Malcolm Ross (2005) removed them and linked them with another erstwhile branch of TNG in a Tor–Kwerba proposal. Usher follows Ross, but adds the Nimboran languages as well.

=== Foley (2018) ===
Foley (2018) provides the following classification.

- Kwerba
  - Isirawa / Saberi
  - - Airoran
    - Samarokena
  - - Bagusa
    - Kauwera / Kaowerawedj
    - Kwerba / Air Mati
    - Kwerba Mamberamo / Nopuk
    - Trimuris

=== Usher (2020) ===
Usher uses the label 'West Foja Range' to avoid the ambiguity of the name 'Kwerb(a/ic)'.

- West Foja Range
  - Isirawa
  - Masep
  - Kapauri–Sause
    - Kapauri
    - Sause
  - Apauwar River
    - Apauwar Coast
      - Airoran
      - Samarokena
    - Kwerba
      - Kwerba (Sasawa)
      - Kwerba Mamberamo (Nopuk)
      - Trimuris
      - Bagusa
      - Kauwera

== Basic vocabulary ==
Basic vocabulary in Kwerba family languages (Isirawa, Kwerba, Kauwera, Samarokena) listed by Foley (2018) is provided below. Data for Samarokena is limited, but clear cognates linking Samarokena to the other Kwerba languages include the words for ‘fire’, ‘man’, ‘stone’, and ‘sun’ (note that hV- is assumed to be an accretion).

Kwerba family basic vocabulary
gloss	Isirawa	Kwerba	Kauwera	Samarokena
‘bird’	apre	kaijetin	kaceten	
‘blood’	asmɪra	kumwa	sac	
‘bone’	awa	kak	kaka	
‘eat’		na-	nanam	
‘egg’	cawarfa	koret	inəm	mehinia
‘eye’	nuera	nukwe	nuk	
‘fire’	aniva	siraba	ser	hesida
‘ground’	u	isiu	esiu	era
‘hair’	perisira	nerij	niric	
‘I’	e	co	co	ata
‘leg’	teni	tɪnic	tenij	
‘louse’		negwan	neːnun	
‘man’	ɪ	ana-	ana	ana
‘one’	mri	aberias	abic	oha
‘penis’	taun	tau	taua	
‘see’	warɪ-	wa-	uwarim	
‘sky’	ono	onis	unis	
‘stone’	bati	ton	ton	obəta
‘sun’	sobe	abij	abic	habesia
‘tooth’	wana	kwanə	kwan	
‘tree’	warara	ic	ic	
‘two’	napnɪ	nenemwan	ninic	ened
‘water’	pu	pitu	pitew	bipihina
‘we’	ne	nino	neno	niːna
‘woman’	avi	es	is	
‘you (sg)’	mɪ	ame	am	ama

== See also ==
- Orya–Tor languages
