= Dani–Kwerba languages =

1962 hypothetical language family proposed by Arthur Capell

Dani–Kwerba
- (obsolete)
- Geographic distribution: New Guinea
- Linguistic classification: (Trans–New Guinea): Dani–Kwerba
- Subdivisions: Dani; Kwerba; Saberi (Isirawa); Samarokena

Language codes
- Glottolog: None

The Dani–Kwerba languages were a hypothetical language family proposed by Arthur Capell in 1962 and adopted by Stephen Wurm as part of his Trans–New Guinea (TNG) phylum. Malcolm Ross reassigned the Dani languages to a West Trans–New Guinea linkage and the Kwerba languages to his Tor–Kwerba family, outside of TNG altogether.
