= Isirawa language =

Kwerbic language spoken in Indonesia

Isirawa
- Saberi
- Native to: Indonesia
- Region: Papua
- Native speakers: (1,800 cited 2000)
- Language family: Foja Range: Kwerbic; Isirawa

Language codes
- ISO 639-3: srl
- Glottolog: isir1237
- ELP: Isirawa

Isirawa is a Papuan language spoken by about two thousand people on the north coast of Papua province, Indonesia. It is a local trade language, and use is vigorous. Stephen Wurm (1975) linked it to the Kwerba languages within the Trans–New Guinea family, and it does share about 20% of its vocabulary with neighboring Kwerba languages. However, based on its pronouns, Malcolm Ross (2005) felt he could not substantiate such a link, and left it as a language isolate. The pronouns are not, however, dissimilar from those of Orya–Tor, which Ross links to Kwerba, and Donahue (2002) accept it as a Greater Kwerba language.

== Locations ==
In Sarmi Regency, Isirawa is spoken in Amsira, Arabais, Arsania, Kamenawari, Mararena, Martewar, Nisero, Nuerawar, Perkami, Siaratesa, Waim, Wari, and Webro villages.

== Grammar ==
In Isirawa, the feminine gender is associated with big objects, and masculine with small objects; the opposite association is found in Tayap and the Sepik languages, which classify large objects as masculine rather than feminine.

== Phonology ==
=== Consonants ===
		Labial	Alveolar	Post- alveolar	Velar	Glottal
Nasal		m	n			
Plosive/Affricate		p	t	tʃ	k	
Fricative	voiceless	f	s			h
Fricative	voiced	β				
Rhotic			ɾ			
Approximant		w		j		

- /n/ may be heard as [ɲ] when before /i/, and as [ŋ] when before /k/.
- /k/ can be heard as [ʔ] in syllable-final positions after a vowel.
- /j/ can also be heard as a fricative [ʝ] in free variation.
- /w/ can also be heard as [ɣ] when between back vowels.

=== Vowels ===
	Front	Central	Back
High	i		u
Near-high	ɪ		
High-mid			o
Low-mid	ɛ	ʌ	ɔ
Low		a	

== Pronouns ==
The Isirawa pronouns are,

I	a-, e
we	nen-, ne
you	o-, mə
all third person	e-, maə, ce, pe

Ross's reconstructed Orya–Tor pronouns are *ai 'I', *ne 'we' (inclusive), *emei 'thou', *em 'you'.

Isirawa pronoun paradigm as given in Foley (2018):

pronoun	nominative	accusative	possessive
1s	e	afo	wə
2s	mɪ	ofo	of
3s		efo	ef
1d	ne	nenfo	nenef
2d	mɪ	ofnafo	ofnaf
3d		efnafo	efnaf
1p	ne	nenfɪvo	nenfɪ(v)
2p	mɪ	ofɪvo	ofɪ(v)
3p		efɪvo	efɪ(v)
