= Nimboran languages =

Foja Range language family of New Guinea

Nimboran
- Grime River
- Geographic distribution: Grime-Nawa Valley, Jayapura Regency, Papua Province, Indonesia
- Linguistic classification: Northwest Papuan?: Foja Range (Tor–Kwerba); Nimboran

Language codes
- Glottolog: nimb1257

The Nimboran languages are a small family of Papuan languages, spoken by the Nimboran people in the Grime River and Nawa River watershed in Jayapura Regency, that had been part of Stephen Wurm's Trans–New Guinea proposal. However, when proto-Nimboran pronouns are reconstructed (*genam "I" and kom or komot "thou"), they have little resemblance to the proto-TNG pronouns *na and *ga. Usher places them in a North Papuan stock that resembles Cowan's proposal.

Foley (2018) classifies the Nimboran languages separately as an independent language family.

== Classification ==
The languages are:

- Nimboran (Grime River)
  - East
    - Mekwei (Moi)
    - Gresi–Kemtuik
      - Kemtuik
      - Gresi
  - West
    - Mlap (Kuangsu)
    - Namblong (Nimboran)

== Proto-language ==
=== Pronouns ===
The pronouns Ross (2005) reconstructs for proto-Nimboran are,

I	*genam
thou	*kom, komot
s/he	?

Below are pronouns in the Nimboran languages as given by Foley (2018):

Nimboran pronouns
	Nimboran	Kemtuik	Gresi	Mlap	Mekwei
1excl	ngo	gənam	ganam	ngam	kə ~ kat
1incl	yo	imot			
2	ko	mot	ko	kom	kmot
3	no	nemot			

As in Kaure, pronouns are not specified for number in the Nimboran language.

=== Basic vocabulary ===
Some lexical reconstructions by Usher (2020) are:

gloss	Proto-Grime River
head	*jaŋkaMBʉ
leaf/head hair	*ndɜp
ear	*kam[a/ɔ]; *kəni[n/ŋ]
eye	*namuɔ
tooth	*səɺiŋ; *wasəɺa[ŋ]
tongue	*anəmbəɺ[i/ɛ]ŋ; *mambəɺ[ɜ/ɔ]p
foot/leg	*masi
blood/red	*kin
seed/bone	*ndɜn
skin/bark	*asu[p/k]
breast/milk	*min
louse	*səna[ŋ]
dog	*unduɔ
pig	*inəmbuɔ
bird	*jʉ
egg	*səwip[i]
tree/wood	*ndi
man/male	*səɺu
woman	*kambuŋ; *ki
sun	*wɔj
moon	*mbanu
water/river	*mbu
fire	*kip; *kɜj
stone	*ndəmuɔ
path	*tap
name	*sʉ
eat	*ndam
one	*kapəɺaj[a]
two	*namuan

== Vocabulary comparison ==
The following basic vocabulary words are from Voorhoeve (1975), as cited in the Trans-New Guinea database.

The words cited constitute translation equivalents, whether they are cognate (e.g. yaŋkabu, iŋkabu for “head”) or not (e.g. kapray, tendu for “one”).

gloss	Gresi	Kemtuik	Mekwei	Mlap	Nimboran
head	yaŋkabu	iŋkabu	yekembu	yaŋkambu	iŋgiambu
hair	bətə-dop	dop	bəterep	məndü-pra	mendü-pro
eye	nam	nmu-tugon	namo-den	nuŋgroŋ	nuŋgroŋ
tooth	səriŋ	wasraŋ	siŋyaŋ	səriŋ-dowŋ	hriŋ-douŋ
leg	masi	masi	masi	mesi	mesi
louse	səna	səne	səne	səne	hnaŋ
dog	udo	udo	ando	undo	unduo
pig	nəmbu	nəmbo	mbo	ibo	ibwo
bird	iü	iü	ü	iü	iü
egg	si	si	səbi	süp	süp
blood	kiŋ	kiŋ	kiŋ	kiŋ	kiŋ
bone	don	don	den	dowŋ	douŋ
skin	suk	saisuk	asuk	sup	sub
tree	di	di	di	di	di-tim
man	sərə	səruə	si	sru	hru
sun	woy	woy	woy	woy	uai
water	bu	bu	bu	bu	bu
fire	koy	koy	kei-sini	kip	kip
stone	dom	dəmu	dəmo	dəmu	demue
name	sü	siü	siu	sü	sü
eat	dam	dam	anime	dam	dam
one	kray	kraya	kapray	tendu	tendü
two	namon	namon	naman	namoŋ	namuan
