= Oria =

Oria may refer to:

== Places ==
=== Italy ===
- Oria, Apulia, a town in the Apulia region, Province of Brindisi
- Oria, Lombardy, a village in the municipality of Valsolda, in the Province of Como

=== Spain ===
- Oria, Spain, a municipality in the Province of Almería, Andalusia
- Oria (river), a river in the Province of Gipuzkoa, Basque Country
- Former village and industrial centre in Lasarte-Oria by the river Oria, Gipuzkoa, Basque Country

== People ==
- Auria, called Oria in Spanish, queen of Pamplona in the 10th century
- In Greek mythology, Oria (Ὀρεία), was a daughter of Thespis and Megamede, and mother of Laomenes.

Surname

- Ángel Herrera Oria (1886–1968), Spanish journalist and Roman Catholic politician and later a cardinal
- Shelly Oria, Israeli-American author

== Other uses ==
- Oria language (disambiguation)
  - Odia language or Oriya, predominantly used in the Indian state of Odisha
- Oria (moth), a genus of noctuid moths
- SS Oria, three steamships named Oria

== See also ==
- Oriya (disambiguation)
- Orya (disambiguation)
- Aurea (disambiguation)
- Auria (disambiguation)
