= Kwinsu language =

Foja Range language spoken in Indonesia

Kwinsu
- Ansudu
- Native to: Indonesia
- Region: West Papua
- Native speakers: 500 (2007)
- Language family: Foja Range (Tor–Kwerba): Orya–Tor; Tor; Tor Coast; East; Kwinsu

Language codes
- ISO 639-3: kuc
- Glottolog: kwin1242

Kwinsu is a Papuan language of Indonesia. It is spoken in Ansudu village in Pantai Timur subdistrict, Sarmi Regency.
