= Kaure language =

Language in Indonesia

Kaure
- Native to: Indonesia
- Region: Papua: Aurina, Harna, Lereh, Masta, and Wes villages on the Nawa River
- Native speakers: (450 cited 1995)
- Language family: Kaure–Kosare: Kaure
- Dialects: Narau

Language codes
- ISO 639-3: bpp
- Glottolog: kaur1271
- ELP: Kaure; Narau
- Map: The Kaure, Kapori, and Kosare languages of New Guinea The Kaure, Kapori, and Kosare languages Other Trans–New Guinea languages Other Papuan languages Austronesian languages Uninhabited

Kaure is a Papuan language of West Papua. It is spoken in the villages of Lereh, Harna, Wes, Masta, and Aurina.

Narau is either a dialect or a closely related language. It is known from a short word list in Giël (1959). Texts include Auri et al. (1991).

== Phonology ==
=== Consonants ===
The Kaure consonants are:

		Labial	Alveolar	Palatal	Velar	Glottal
Nasal		m	n			
Plosive	voiceless	p	t		k	
Plosive	voiced	ᵐb	ⁿd	ʤ		
Fricative			s			h
Liquid				l		
Semivowel		w		j		

=== Vowels ===
The Kaure vowels are:

	Front	Back
Close	i, y	
Mid	e	o
Open	a	

=== Tone ===
Like the Lakes Plain languages, Kaure is a tonal language. There are two tones, namely high and low.

Monosyllabic minimal pairs showing phonemic tone contrast include:

- tái ‘footprint’, tài ‘sago’
- pí ‘boil’, pì ‘pig’
- hín ‘limbum wood’, hìn ‘blood’
- héik ‘flower’, hèik ‘snake’

In multisyllabic words, only one stressed syllable carries full tone contrasts, while the other syllables are "neutral" or toneless.

Multisyllabic minimal sets include:

- káteil ‘toss it’, katéil ‘dry’, katèil ‘dry’
- nálain ‘female animal’, naláin ‘kind of root’, nalàin ‘to run off’

== Pronouns ==
Attested pronouns are 1sg wẽ, 2sg hane, 1pl nene. The 2sg form resembles Mek *ka-n, and 1pl resembles Pauwasi numu~nin, but apart from that little can be said.

Kaure pronouns listed by Foley (2018) are:

	Independent	Possessive prefixes
1excl	wen	na-
1incl	nene	nene-
2	hane	ha-
3	nene	ne-

Kaure pronouns are not specified for number, just like in Nimboran.

== Kaure–Kapori hypothesis ==
Voorhoeve (1975) suggested that Kaure was related to Kapori and Kosare, two otherwise unclassified languages. However, subsequent evaluations have not found any significant connections (Rumaropen 2006, Wambaliau 2006).
