= Vitou language =

Foja Range language spoken in Indonesia

Vitou
- Manirem, Takar
- Native to: Indonesia
- Region: West Papua
- Native speakers: 630 (2007)
- Language family: Foja Range (Tor–Kwerba): Orya–Tor; Tor; Tor Coast; East; Vitou–Betaf; Vitou

Language codes
- ISO 639-3: vto
- Glottolog: vito1235

Vitou (Manirem, Takar) is a Papuan language of Indonesia used mainly by older adults. It is spoken in Takar village, Sarmi Regency, and is one of two languages known as "Manirem", the other being Betaf.
