= Dabe language =

Papuan language of Indonesia

Dabe
- Native to: Indonesia
- Region: West Papua
- Native speakers: 440 (2005)
- Language family: Foja Range (Tor–Kwerba): Orya–Tor; Tor; Tor Coast; Dabe

Language codes
- ISO 639-3: dbe
- Glottolog: dabe1239
- ELP: Dabe

Dabe is a Papuan language of Indonesia. It is spoken in Dabe village, Pantai Timur subdistrict, Sarmi Regency.
