= Sause language =

Kwerbic language spoken in Indonesia

Sause
- Native to: Indonesia
- Region: West Papua
- Native speakers: (250 cited 2000)
- Language family: Foja Range: Kwerbic; Kapauri–Sause; Sause

Language codes
- ISO 639-3: sao
- Glottolog: saus1247
- ELP: Sause

Sause is a Papuan language spoken in Indonesia, to the southwest of Sentani. Its classification is uncertain, but it appears to be related to Kapauri and the Tor languages.

Sause is spoken in Ures, Mubararon, Sause-Bokoko, Witti-Yadow, Lidya, and Puaral villages.
