= ISO 639:bnv =

ISO 639-3 code bnv may refer to the following Papuan languages of Indonesia:

- Bonerif language
- Edwas language, or Beneraf language
