= Betaf language =

Tor language spoken in Indonesia

Betaf
- Manirem, Tena
- Native to: Indonesia
- Region: West Papua
- Native speakers: 600 (2005)
- Language family: Foja Range (Tor–Kwerba): Orya–Tor; Tor; Tor Coast; East; Vitou–Betaf; Betaf

Language codes
- ISO 639-3: bfe
- Glottolog: beta1253
- ELP: Betaf

Betaf (Manirem, Tena) is a Papuan language of Indonesia. It is spoken in Betaf village, Sarmi Regency, and is one of two languages known as "Manirem", the other being Vitou.
