= Kwesten language =

Tor language spoken in Indonesia

Kwesten
- Native to: Indonesia
- Region: West Papua
- Native speakers: (2,000 cited 1987)
- Language family: Foja Range (Tor–Kwerba): Orya–Tor; Tor; Tor Coast; Kwesten

Language codes
- ISO 639-3: kwt
- Glottolog: kwes1245

Kwesten is a Papuan language of Indonesia.

It is spoken in Arare, Holmhaven, Mafenter, and Omte villages in Sarmi Regency.
