= Kwerba Mamberamo language =

Kwerbic language spoken in Indonesia

Kwerba Mamberamo
- Nopuk
- Native to: Indonesia
- Region: Papua
- Native speakers: (300 cited 1993)
- Language family: Foja Range: Kwerbic; Nuclear Kwerba; Kwerba Mamberamo

Language codes
- ISO 639-3: xwr
- Glottolog: kwer1263

Kwerba Mamberamo is a Papuan language of Indonesia.
