= Keijar language =

Papuan language of Indonesia

Keijar
- Keder
- Native to: Indonesia
- Region: West Papua
- Native speakers: 370 (2005)
- Language family: Foja Range (Tor–Kwerba): Orya–Tor; Tor; Tor Coast; Keijar

Language codes
- ISO 639-3: kdy
- Glottolog: kede1239
- ELP: Keder

Keijar (Keder) is a Papuan language of Indonesia used mainly by older adults.
