= Itik language =

Foja Range language spoken in Indonesia

Itik
- Etik, Ittik, Ittik-Tor, Borto
- Native to: Indonesia
- Region: West Papua
- Ethnicity: 200
- Native speakers: (80 cited 2000)
- Language family: Foja Range (Tor–Kwerba): Orya–Tor; Tor; East; Itik

Language codes
- ISO 639-3: itx
- Glottolog: itik1240
- ELP: Itik

Itik is a Papuan language of Indonesia. It was not found in a 2005 language survey; it is not clear if this means it is no longer spoken or if the speakers have moved.
