= Narau =

Narau may refer to:

- Narau language, dialect of or related to Kaure language
- Narew, a river in Eastern Europe
- Nauru, an island nation in the South Pacific
