= Berik language =

Tor language spoken in Indonesia

Berik
- Sewan
- Native to: Indonesia
- Region: Tor Atas district, Sarmi Regency
- Native speakers: (1,200 cited 1994)
- Language family: Foja Range (Tor–Kwerba): Orya–Tor; Tor; Berik–Bonerif; Berik
- Writing system: Latin

Language codes
- ISO 639-3: bkl
- Glottolog: beri1254

Berik (Sewan) is a Papuan language spoken in Indonesia. Speakers are located in four village groups on the Tor River, in Sarmi Regency, Papua Province.

US linguist John McWhorter cited Berik as an example of a language which puts concepts "together in ways more fascinatingly different from English than most of us are aware". Illustrating this, in the phrase Kitobana (meaning "[he] gives three large objects to a male in the sunlight"), affixes indicating time of day, object number, object size, and gender of recipient are added to the verb.

== Locations ==
In Sarmi, Berik is spoken in:

- Tor Atas District
  - Beu Village
  - Bota-Bora Village
  - Dangken Village
  - Kanderjan Village
  - Safron Tane Village
  - Samanente Village
  - Taminambor Village
  - Tenwer Village
  - Toganto Village
  - Waaf village
- Sarmi Timur District
  - Sewan Village
- Bonggo District
  - Tarontha Village

== Phonology ==
=== Consonants ===
		Labial	Alveolar	(Alveolo-) palatal	Velar
Nasal		m [m]	n [n]		ng [ŋ]
Plosive & affricate	voiceless	p [p]	t [t]		k [k]
Plosive & affricate	voiced	b [b]	d [d]	j [d͡ʑ]	g [ɡ]
Fricative		f [f]	s [s]		
Approximant			l [l]	y [j]	w [w]
Tap			r [ɾ]		

=== Vowels ===
Berik has the common six vowel system (/a/, /e/, /i/, /o/, and /u/ plus /ə/).

	Front	Central	Back
Close	i [i]		u [u]
Mid	e [e]	ə [ə]	o [o]
Open		a [a]	

== Verbal morphology ==
Westrum (1988:150) briefly indicates that Berik encodes whether the action takes place during the day (diurnal) or during the night (nocturnal) in the verb morphology, a rare case of periodic tense whose markers are not easily segmentable.

Sample of diurnal and nocturnal distinctions in the paradigm of the verb ‘to give’ in Berik (Westrum 1988:150, Jacques 2023:5, Table 1).
Period	Present	Past	Future
Diurnal	gulbana	gulbanant	gulbafa
Nocturnal	gulbasa	gulbafant	gubafa

== Sample ==
- Angtaneʻ bosna Usafe je gatas tarnap ge nuin. Tesa ga belim taban, ga jes talebowel.
- "There was once a person named Usafe who lived near the sago acreages. Whenever he finished cutting down a sago tree, he pounded it"
