= Dineor language =

Foja Range language spoken in Indonesia

Maremgi
- Dineor
- Native to: Indonesia
- Region: West Papua
- Native speakers: 55 (2006)
- Language family: Foja Range (Tor–Kwerba): Orya–Tor; Tor; Maremgi

Language codes
- ISO 639-3: mrx
- Glottolog: mare1261
- ELP: Maremgi

Maremgi, also known as Dineor, is a Papuan language of Indonesia. It is spoken near the village of Bonggo, west of Jayapura, in a place also known as Maremgi.

== Word lists ==
English	Dineor
cassowary	jatram
crocodile	jarom
egg	susu
father	baba
fire	msuram, msuruam
fish	bore
house	osa
man	senase
moon	fen
mother	mama
pig	dbua
stone	ewam
water	fo

Numbers

1	abdina, afdikna
2	nawe
3	nawesore
4	nawe-nawe
5	afatefafe
6	afatefa-abdina
7	afatefa-nawe
8	afatefa-nawesore
9	afatefa-nawenawe
10	nawe-tefafe

Note - The counting system in Dineor may extend to twenty.
