= Jofotek-Bromnya language =

Papuan language of Indonesia

Jofotek-Bromnya
- Native to: Indonesia
- Region: West Papua
- Native speakers: 200 (2007)
- Language family: Foja Range (Tor–Kwerba): Orya–Tor; Tor; East; Jofotek-Bromnya
- Dialects: Jofotek; Bromnya

Language codes
- ISO 639-3: jbr – inclusive code Individual code: mqr – Mander
- Glottolog: jofo1235 Jofotek-Bromnya mand1443 Mander
- ELP: Mander

Jofotek-Bromnya is a Papuan language of Sarmi Regency, Papua, Indonesia.

There are two dialects:

- Bromnya dialect, spoken in Srum village, Bonggo subdistrict
- Jofotek dialect, spoken in Biridua village, Pantai Timur subdistrict

Colonial records of Mander show it to be the same language.
