= Airoran language =

Foja Range language spoken in Indonesia

Airoran
- Adora, Iriemkena
- Region: Papua (Sarmi)
- Native speakers: (1,000 cited 1998)
- Language family: Foja Range: Kwerbic; Apauwar Coast; Airoran

Language codes
- ISO 639-3: air
- Glottolog: airo1242

Airoran is a language of Indonesia, spoken in the north coast area on the lower Apauwar River of Papua (Irian Jaya), in the villages of Subu, Motobiak, Isirania, etc. It is rather divergent from other Kwerba languages, though clearly related.
