= Mander people =

Ethnic group in Indonesia

Mander–Borto

Total population
- 30 (1989)

Regions with significant populations
- Indonesia (Papua)

Languages
- Mander

Religion
- Christianity

Related ethnic groups
- Manirem (Berik • Mander–Borto • Kwesten)

The Mander people (Mander: Mander–Borto) are a small, formerly nomadic ethnic group living around the upper reaches of the Tor and Bu rivers in northern Papua, Indonesia. They are closely related to their sister group the Borto, and part of the larger Manirem people. Their settlements were located within the East Coast and Upper Tor districts, east of the Berik territory. Their population was around 30 in 1989, and they may now have been assimilated into other Manirem groups.
