= Apauwar Coast languages =

Samarokena–Airoran
- Apauwar Coast
- Geographic distribution: New Guinea
- Linguistic classification: Foja Range: Kwerbic; Apauwar–Kwerba; Samarokena–Airoran
- Subdivisions: Samarokena; Airoran

Language codes
- ISO 639-3: –
- Glottolog: west1486

The Apauwar Coast languages, also known as Samarokena–Airoran, is a pair of closely related languages of Indonesian West Papua. They are the closest relatives of the Kwerba languages.
