= Nimboran people =

Ethnic group in Indonesia

Nambrung, Nambrong, Namlong, Namblung, Namblong
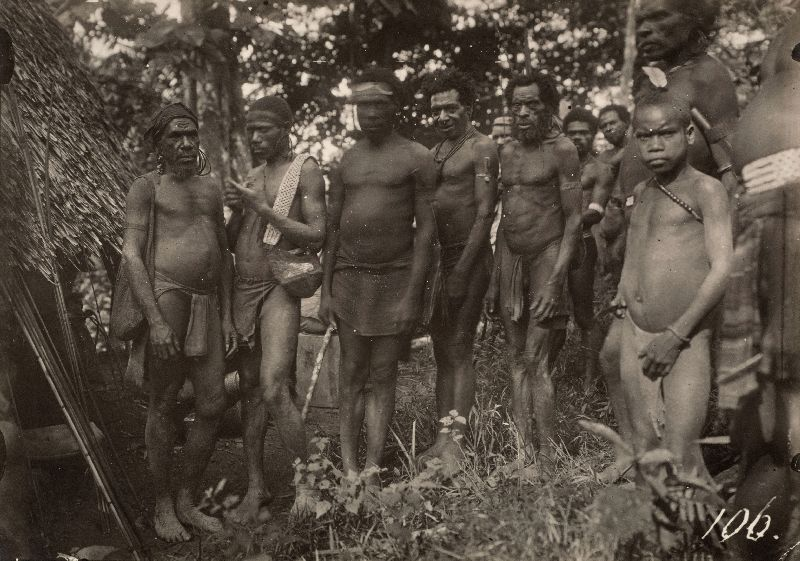
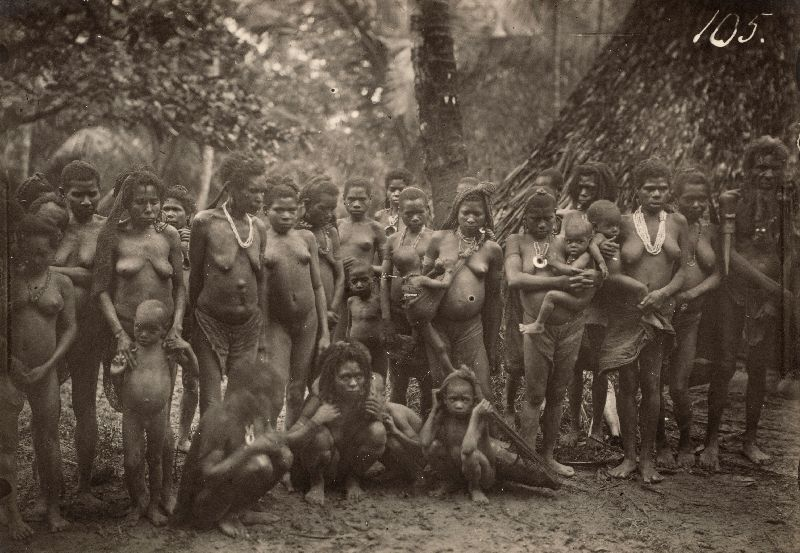
- Namblong people during North New Guinea Expedition, 1903

Total population
- 17,822

Regions with significant populations
- Indonesia (Jayapura Regency, Papua)

Languages
- Nimboran

Related ethnic groups
- Gresi • Kemtuk • Sewan • Sentani

The Nimboran people (Nimboran: Nambrung or Nambrong) are an ethnic group living in the valleys of the Sermowai, Moaif, and Nimboran rivers in Papua, Indonesia. They have 30 villages now, which are divided into three districts of Nimboran, Nimbokrang, and Nambluong in Jayapura Regency. Well-known villages include Genyem, Ambrop, Warombai, Imeno, Sermai, and Berap, and their population was around 4,000 in 1986 and could be up to 17,822 in 2024. The name "Nimboran" may originate from a tributary of the Nimbu River.

== Language ==
The Nimboran people speak the Nimboran language (also spelled Namblong). In 1978, there were approximately 3,500 speakers. The language is related to the Sewan language and the Sentani language. After 1915, with the arrival of missionaries, many Nimboran people learned Malay, which was used as a lingua franca in schools, and some also learned Dutch.

== Livelihood ==
Most Nimboran people engage in subsistence farming, growing tubers, cassava, taro, corn, vegetables, and fruit. Traditionally, fields were moved to find fertile soil, but modern practices have become more intensive. They also fish in nearby rivers and hunt animals such as cassowaries, cuscus, and birds.

Nimboran communities are usually located on hillsides. The basic social unit is the extended family, combining junior and senior households. Their social structure follows a patrilineal system.
