= Bonerif language =

Papuan language of Indonesia

Bonerif
- Native to: Indonesia
- Region: West Papua
- Native speakers: 200 (2005)
- Language family: Foja Range (Tor–Kwerba): Orya–Tor; Tor; Berik–Bonerif; Bonerif

Language codes
- ISO 639-3: bnv (all language codes used for both Bonerif and Edwas / Beneraf)
- Glottolog: bone1255
- ELP: Bonerif
- Bonerif language is classified as Critically Endangered by the UNESCO Atlas of the World's Languages in Danger.

Bonerif is a Papuan language of Indonesia. It is closely related to Berik. The ISO 639 standard confuses it with Beneraf, another language in the same family.
