= Mekwei language =

Foja Range language spoken in Indonesia

Mekwei
- Mooi, Moi, Menggei, Menggwei, Munggai, Mungge, Munkei, Demenggong-Waibron-Bano, Waipu
- Region: Papua
- Native speakers: (1,200 cited 1987)
- Language family: Foja Range: Nimboran; Mekwei

Language codes
- ISO 639-3: msf
- Glottolog: mekw1241

Mekwei (Menggwei), or Mooi, is a Papuan language of Jayapura Regency, Papua, Indonesia. It is spoken in Kendate, Maribu, Sabron Dosay, and Waibrong villages.
