= Mawes language =

Language in Papua

Mawes
- Region: Papua, Sarmi Regency, to the west of the Buri River: Bonggo District: Maweswares; Bonggo Timur District: Mawesday, Mawes Mukti villages
- Extinct: by 2024
- Language family: Northwest Papuan?: Foja Range; Mawes

Language codes
- ISO 639-3: mgk – inclusive code Individual code: wai – Wares
- Glottolog: mawe1251 Mawes ware1254 Wares (unattested)
- ELP: Mawes

Mawes is a recently extinct Papuan language of Indonesia.

Usher (2020) proposes that it may be related to the Kwerbic languages. Foley (2018) classifies Mawes as a language isolate, and so does Hammarström (2010). It had 850 native speakers in 2006, but was extinct by 2024.

== Pronouns ==
Pronouns are:

	sg	pl
1	kidam	inim
2	nam	nɛm
3	ɛbɛ	mia

== Basic vocabulary ==
Basic vocabulary of Mawes listed in Foley (2018):

Mawes basic vocabulary
gloss	Mawes
‘bird’	ikinin
‘blood’	wɛrɛi
‘bone’	tuan
‘ear’	bɛr
‘eat’	nan
‘egg’	siwin
‘eye’	nonsum
‘fire’	kani
‘leg, foot’	yaʔ
‘louse’	sene
‘name’	dimanɛ
‘one’	mɛndakai
‘see’	nomo
‘sky’	kowan
‘stone’	fɛt
‘sun’	ɛsar
‘tooth’	wan
‘tree’	dengkin
‘two’	yakɛneu
‘water’	bo
‘woman’	yei

The following basic vocabulary words are from Voorhoeve (1975), as cited in the Trans-New Guinea database:

gloss	Mawes
head	defar
hair	tere
eye	nonsom
tooth	wan
leg	ija
dog	wede
pig	was
bird	ikinin
egg	siwin
blood	werei
bone	tuan
skin	dukunen
tree	deŋkin
man	ke
sun	esar
water	bo
fire	kani
stone	feyt
name	dimane
eat	nano
one	mendakai
two	yakenew

== Sentences ==
Of the few sentences that have been documented for Mawes, some example sentences are:

ɛbɛ marsya nomtak
3SG yesterday come
‘He came yesterday.’

wɛdɛ ɛbɛ ketes
dog 3SG bite
‘The dog bit him.’

ke-me totoso kida-wɛn mamɛnta fɛn tamu(k)
man-? money 1SG-POSS father DAT/ALL give
‘That man gave money to my father.’

ɛbɛ-mɛ dengkin nambuak kom sorna
3sg-? tree machete INSTR cut
‘He is cutting wood with a machete.’

ke-me sau fɛn banak
man-? village DAT/ALL go
‘That man went to the village.’

ke-me sau-er nom
man-? village-ABL come
‘That man came from the village.’

ke-me yei dete banak
man-? woman COM go
‘That man went with his wife.’
