= George W. Grace =

American ethnolinguist (1921–2015)

- Grace in his 1991 Festschrift
- Born: September 8, 1921; Corinth, Mississippi, U.S.
- Died: January 17, 2015 (aged 93); Honolulu, Hawaii, U.S.
- Occupation: Linguist
- Spouse(s): Peggy Plummer (m. 1960, divorced) Elizabeth Foster (after 1969)

Academic background
- Education: Columbia University
- Thesis: The Position of the Polynesian Languages within the Austronesian (Malayo-Polynesian) Language Family (1958)
- Doctoral advisor: Joseph Greenberg

Academic work
- Institutions: University of California, Berkeley; Women's College at the University of North Carolina in Greensboro; Southern Illinois University; University of Hawaiʻi at Mānoa
- Doctoral students: John Lynch; Robert Blust; František Lichtenberk
- Main interests: Austronesian languages
- Military career
- Allegiance: United States
- Branch: Army Air Corps
- Service years: 1942–1946
- Unit: 304th Troop Carrier Squadron
- Conflicts: World War II; North African campaign; Allied invasion of Sicily; Allied invasion of Italy

George William Grace (September 8, 1921 – January 17, 2015) was an American ethnolinguist and anthropologist, best known for his contributions to the historical and comparative study of the Oceanic languages of Melanesia. In 1961, he helped found the academic journal Oceanic Linguistics and served as its first editor-in-chief for thirty years. He is considered to be one of the most important figures in the study of the Oceanic languages' histories and interrelationships.

Born in Corinth, Mississippi, Grace grew up on the state's Gulf Coast and initially studied music in college. In 1942, he joined the Army Air Corps following the attack on Pearl Harbor, serving as a flight navigator with the 304th Troop Carrier Squadron. After the war, he settled in Switzerland to study French, German, and political science at the University of Geneva and the Geneva Graduate Institute. Grace was hired as an anthropological researcher at the University of California, Berkeley, where he worked with Alfred L. Kroeber, and later by Yale University, where he assisted in the mass collection of linguistic data in the Pacific.

With Joseph Greenberg as his doctoral advisor, Grace completed his PhD in anthropology from Columbia University in 1958, though Isidore Dyen, who was part of the dissertation committee, attempted to thwart the defense. His thesis was later published, and met with immensely positive critical reception. It became an influential work in Austronesian linguistics. After five years teaching in North Carolina and Illinois, he accepted a full professorship from the University of Hawaiʻi, where he remained until his retirement in 1991.

Grace's work touched on a number of subfields, but focused largely on the interaction of synchronic and diachronic analyses, and how linguistic phylogeny can be obfuscated by different kinds of sound changes. He dismissed earlier attempts at phylogenetic research which focused largely on lexicostatistics, which he believed was subordinate to sound change and led to his promulgation of the "aberrant–exemplary" distinction to describe the concept. Grace was also recognized for his work on the philosophy of language, especially on translation studies and the nature of language as a message rather than as a code.

== Early life and education ==
George William Grace was born in Corinth, Mississippi, near the Tennessee border, on September 8, 1921. He was the eldest of three boys born to George Grace, a postmaster, and his wife. The family moved to a farm in Orange Grove, a suburb of Gulfport, Mississippi, on the Gulf Coast, shortly before George began school. Following his high school graduation, he attended Perkinston Junior College just north of the city, majoring in music.

After the attack on Pearl Harbor on December 7, 1941, Grace enlisted the following year in the Army Air Corps and served as a flight navigator for the 304th Troop Carrier Squadron in the North African campaign, the Allied invasion of Sicily, and the following push through the rest of Italy. He became a commissioned officer in November 1944.

Grace was discharged in the summer of 1946, but remained in Europe, deciding to move to Switzerland in part because he had been trying to learn French and German, and in part because "it was one of the few countries that were functioning fairly normally" after the war. In order to attain a Swiss visa, he enrolled in a French language program at the University of Geneva which had no academic requirements.

At 27, he had earned his licence-ès-sciences politiques, mention études internationales ('Bachelor of Science in Political Science, with a specialization in International Studies') at the University of Geneva and the Geneva Graduate Institute in 1949. The same year, he enrolled as a graduate student at Columbia University in New York City.

== Career ==
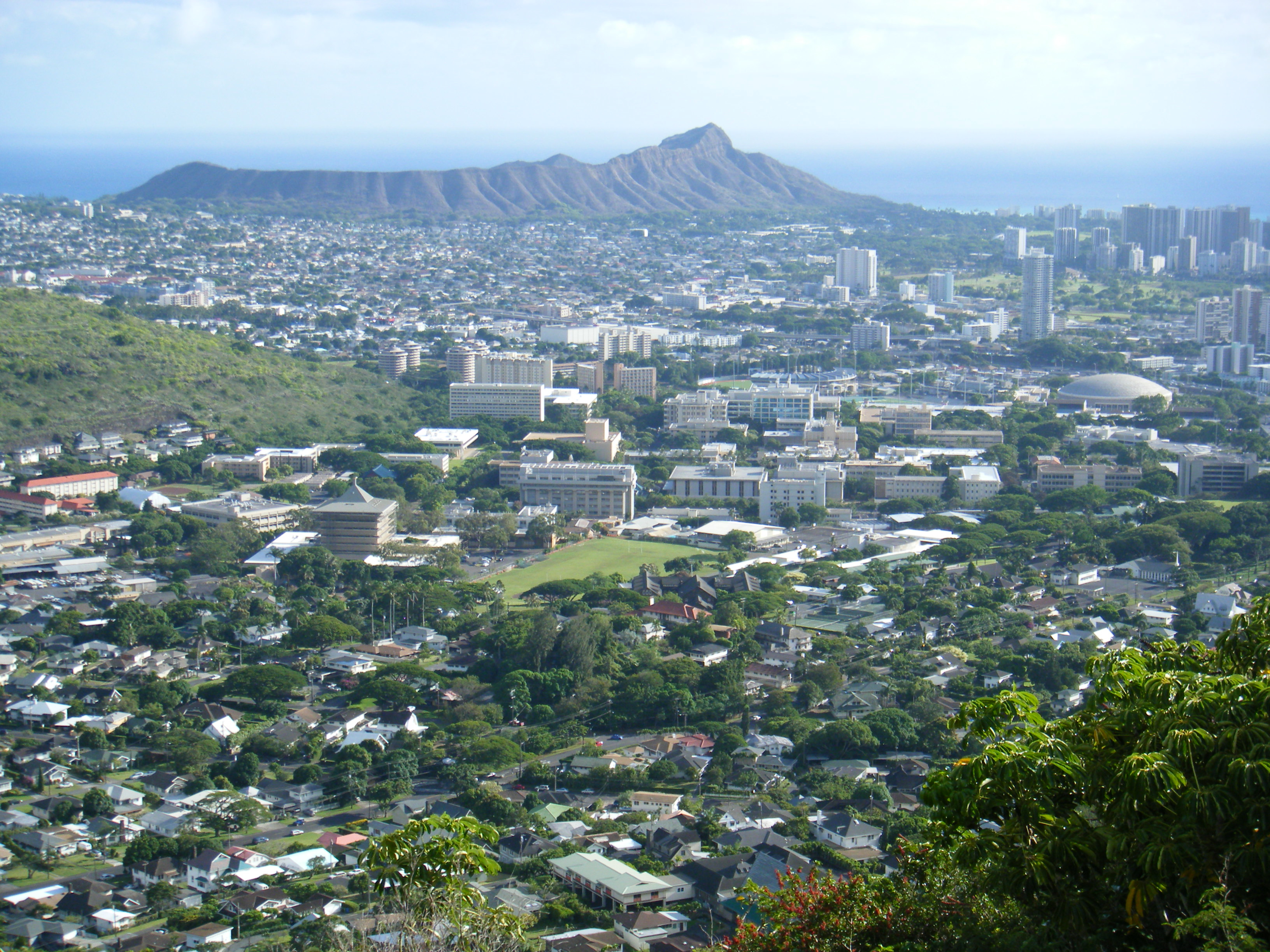
Grace worked at the University of Hawaiʻi at Mānoa from 1964 until his retirement in 1991.

Following his graduation, Grace was offered a position as a junior research anthropologist at the University of California, Berkeley. It is unclear how the offer came to be, as he had no substantive background or training in the field; his former student Robert Blust suggests he may have simply been well-read enough that it justified his hire. During his time at Berkeley, he spent the summer of 1951 studying the Luiseño people of California with Alfred L. Kroeber, culminating in a grammar of their Uto-Aztecan language. He was later promoted to research associate and by 1953, he was working with the Tri-Institutional Pacific Program, a collaborative effort between Yale University, the University of Hawaiʻi, and the Bishop Museum in Honolulu, with funding from the Carnegie Corporation of New York.

Hired by Yale University as an anthropology research assistant in 1954, Grace's first foray into Oceanic linguistics began the following year when he began a linguistic survey of New Caledonia, the Solomon Islands, and colonial holdings in New Guinea. Grace returned the following year with fieldwork on dozens of languages.

In 1958, Grace defended his thesis, advised by Joseph Greenberg. Recognizing his eminence in the field, Grace had invited the American Oceanicist Isidore Dyen to be an external member of the dissertation committee, despite his well-known reputation for being ill-tempered. Dyen was the only member of the committee who refused to accept the thesis. In spite of the attempted thwarting, Grace's thesis was ultimately accepted following Dyen's withdrawal from the committee. Grace published his thesis the following year to immensely positive critical reception.

Following his doctoral degree, Grace was hired as an assistant professor of sociology at the Women's College at the University of North Carolina in Greensboro (now the University of North Carolina at Greensboro) for the 1958–1959 school year. The following year, he moved to the Chicago suburb of Evanston, Illinois, to teach anthropology at Northwestern University for another year. From 1960 to 1963, Grace was hired as an associate professor of anthropology at the Southern Illinois University at the opposite end of the state in Carbondale.

In the fall of 1961, Grace began efforts to fill a gap in scholarship, feeling that Oceanic linguistics had an opportunity to band together and push past colonial-era roadblocks. Linguistic study during the colonial era was difficult; the colonial powers had been focused primarily on maintaining the colonies as opposed to engaging with scientific inquiry. When research could be done, citizens of the colonial power often only published work in their home country in its national language. For non-citizens, administrative approval was often required to even gain access to native speakers of the colony. What few publications outside of the colonial powers that did exist regarding the colonies were an amalgamation of articles in differing fields of study rather than focused publications. The result was the organization and publication of Oceanic Linguistics, an academic journal dedicated specifically to the study of languages in the Pacific.

Grace was chosen as the journal's first editor in part because of his position in the United States. Supporters felt it had a stronger interest in languages, though Grace later recounted that supporters may have also had "a perception that funding might be more available" in the country. Isidore Dyen expressed no interest in the journal at all and no other full-time linguistics professors were American, so the duty fell to Grace. Grace was happy to accept the editorship; he believed that he would be able to influence the direction of the field at large from such a central position, and that his editorship would convince Southern Illinois University to help fund the project.

In 1964, Grace received an offer from the East–West Center to be a scholar-in-residence at the institution in Hawaii; at the end of his one-year residency, he accepted a full professorship at the University of Hawaiʻi at Mānoa's nascent linguistics department. Shortly after his arrival, he began receiving bills for loans he was unaffiliated with and "menacing letters of various kinds" based on the misapprehension that he was another man by the same name, an entrepreneur who had invented a portable flushable toilet. Following Grace's move to Hawaii, Oceanic Linguistics's publication moved with him. Two years afterward, he entered a three-year stint as chairman of the Department of Linguistics after Howard McKaughan became a dean.

== Later years and death ==
In 1991, Grace was presented with a Festschrift, entitled Currents in Pacific Linguistics: Papers on Austronesian Languages and Ethnolinguistics in Honour of George W. Grace with an introduction from Robert Blust. The same year, he appointed Byron W. Bender to replace him as editor-in-chief of Oceanic Linguistics and retired from his professorship, though he continued to teach in a low-load professor emeritus capacity.

On January 17, 2015, Grace died at St. Francis Hospice in Honolulu from myelodysplastic syndrome which ultimately developed into leukemia. A few days before his death, he told Blust: "This is a notoriously good way to die. No pain at all. Don't feel sorry for me."

== Scholarship ==
Grace innovated several different ideas about language during his career, particularly the interface between synchronic and diachronic analysis, and analyzing language through meaning rather than as a code. In summarizing Grace's contributions, Blust wrote:

To the average working linguist George's discussions of language may appear closer to philosophy of language than to linguistics, while to the average working philosopher of language the reverse may appear true.

In historical linguistics, Grace was largely responsible for one of the first major undertakings in Proto-Oceanic lexicography, compiling a massive number of reconstructions from earlier sources in his 1969 Proto-Oceanic finder list based on a 1965 work of his own.

=== Aberrant and exemplary distinction ===
Throughout his study of the languages of Melanesia, Grace felt that there were differences in their developments that could be roughly divided into two camps: "aberrant languages" and "exemplary languages", though he stressed that the two formed a continuum rather than a dichotomy. Originally jokingly called "bad languages", aberrant languages were those with few identifiable cognates because they had gone through numerous or complicated sound changes, obfuscating their phylogenetic position in the language family. Examples of this in the Oceanic languages include Kaulong of New Britain and Aneityum in southern Vanuatu, though Albanian in the Indo-European language family and Blackfoot in the Algonquian language family have also been cited as examples of aberrant languages. Grace described aberrancy as a language having at least one of the following:

1. Relatively small numbers of cognates with other languages in their language family
2. A substantially distinct phonological development, especially one that makes cognate identification more difficult
3. An atypical grammatical structure
4. Difficulty in distinguishing inherited from borrowed vocabulary, often as a result of obfuscating sound changes

By contrast, exemplary languages – jokingly called "good" or "well-behaved languages" – were those which were easily recognizable with a wide set of readily-identifiable cognates and few obfuscating sound changes, such as Saʻa in the Solomon Islands and Fijian. In the 1980s, Grace also began to use the term "bird languages" and "crocodilian languages" for aberrant and exemplary languages respectively, the idea being that the phylogenetic relationship between dinosaurs and crocodiles is much clearer than that of dinosaurs and birds, even though both are related to dinosaurs. Grace believed that lexicostatistical analyses, like those undertaken by Isidore Dyen in 1965, were ineffective and trivial, arguing that lexical diversity was subordinate in phylogenetic analysis to sound changes and that studies estimating vocabulary replacement rates were unreliable.

=== Translation ===
In his 1981 book An Essay on Language, Grace uses the term "content form" to describe the core of his approach to translation. For Grace, this meant "the way in which the idea which [an utterance] expresses is analyzed (construed) for expression – the way it is put into words" and that this fact "creates a model of a bit of reality (or as-if reality)". He contrasted literal translations with free translations. Literal translations placed too much of an emphasis on the idea of translation as a set of word exchanges, transposed from one language without considering the audience, aesthetic choices, or "socioloinguistic and expressive modulation". Free translation, on the other hand, allowed for some level of "idiomaticity" at the cost of conveying "the content form of the original". In other words, Grace thought of translation as broader than replicating another language's vocabulary and grammar. Grace instead views communication, and by extension translation, through what he called "subject-matter-consecrated ways of talking": the confluence of the subject matter at hand, the context in which it is given, its modality, and the specification of the matter to interlocutors.

== Legacy ==
Grace is widely considered one of the most important figures in historical and comparative Oceanic linguistics, and was considered so during his lifetime. When he published his thesis in 1959, its findings "became an instant landmark in the field of Austronesian linguistics". During his tenure at the University of Hawaiʻi, Grace's reputation for his profound knowledge of the field led to him being humorously nicknamed "amazing Grace".

Following a keynote address at the Fifteenth Pacific Science Congress in 1983, Grace was credited with being "instrumental in training an entire generation of Oceanic linguists" and raising the mostly-obscure subfield into a sizeable and respectable field between the 1950s and the 1980s. On campus, he was a popular general member for dissertation committees, having been a part of thirty-nine between 1966 and 1990, more than any other person in the department.

Though early issues were often late, Oceanic Linguistics remained a success. During its fiftieth anniversary retrospective, the journal had published the works of 524 different authors from 189 different institutions. After Bender's eventual departure from the editorship, the position was taken over by the Australian-Vanuatuan linguist John Lynch, a former student of Grace's, in 2007.

== Personal life ==
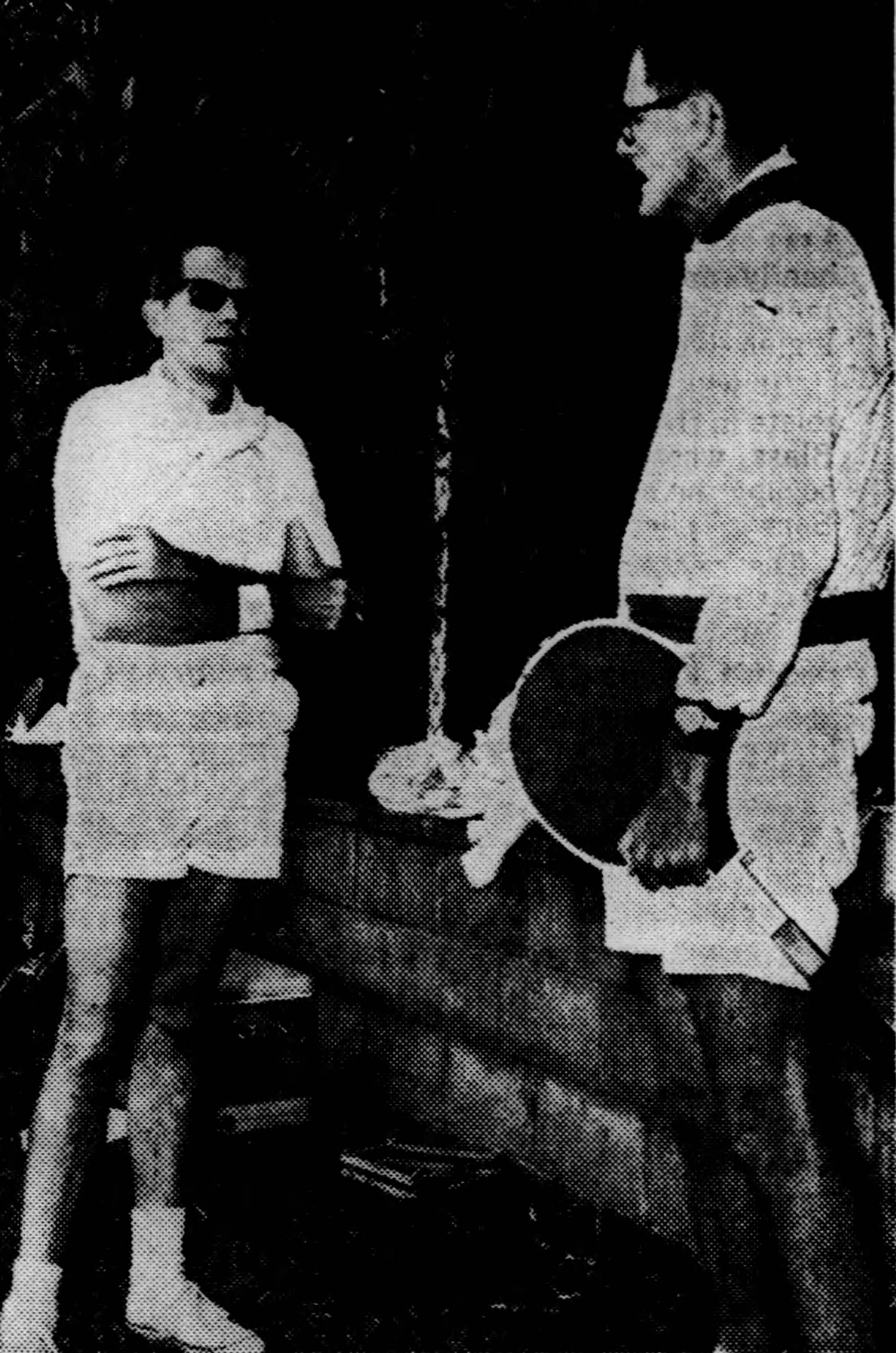
Grace (left) talking with his colleague John Howe at a tennis match in 1968

Aside from his linguistic career, Grace was also a talented tennis player. In the 1970s, he and his doubles partner won second place in a state-wide event. With a different partner, he repeated the success in 1986.

Grace was married twice. His first marriage was to Peggy (née Plummer), a native of Thomasville, North Carolina. The two were married on June 30, 1960, in Evanston, Illinois, by a "somewhat intoxicated" justice of the peace, and had two children, Mark and Erica. The two had met at the Women's College in Greensboro, Grace as a teacher and Plummer as a sociology student. They lived in Carbondale, Illinois, while Grace worked at Southern Illinois University, but moved to Beaumont Woods in Mānoa, a neighborhood of Honolulu, when the two moved to Hawaii. The marriage ended in divorce.

Later in life, Grace married Elizabeth Foster, an English teacher at Punahou School, with whom he raised a son, Matt. They were married at Punahou School's tennis courts, using tennis rackets adorned with flowers as wedding bouquets. At the time of his death, Grace had three grandchildren.

== Selected works ==
- Grace, George W. (1955). "Subgrouping of Malayo-Polynesian: A Report of Tentative Findings". American Anthropologist. 57 (2). American Anthropological Association: 337–339. ISSN 0002-7294. JSTOR 666400.
- —— (1965). "On the Scientific Status of Genetic Classification in Linguistics". Oceanic Linguistics. 4 (1/2). University of Hawai'i Press: 1–14. ISSN 0029-8115. JSTOR 3622914.
- —— (1967). "Effect of Heterogeneity in the Lexicostatistical Test List: The Case of Rotuman". In Highland, Genevieve A.; Force, Roland W.; Howard, Alan; Kelly, Marion; Sinoto, Yosihiko H. (eds.). Polynesian Culture History: Essays in Honor of Kenneth P. Emory. Bernice P. Bishop Museum Special Publication. Vol. 56. Honolulu: Bishop Museum Press. pp. 289–302.
- —— (1970). "Oceanic Linguistics Tomorrow". In Wurm, S. A.; Laycock, D. C. (eds.). Pacific Linguistic Studies in Honour of Arthur Capell. pp. 31–66. doi:10.15144/PL-C13. hdl:1885/146557. ISBN 0-85883-005-1.
- —— (1976). "History of Research in Austronesian Languages of the New Guinea Area: General". In Wurm, S. A. (ed.). New Guinea Area Languages and Language Study Vol. 2: Austronesian Languages. Pacific Linguistics Series C. Vol. 39. Canberra: Australian National University. pp. 55–72. ISBN 0-85883-155-4.
- —— (1981). An Essay on Language. Columbia, South Carolina: Hornbeam Press.
- —— (1987). The Linguistic Construction of Reality. London: Croom Helm. ISBN 0-7099-3886-1.
- —— (1991). "The 'aberrant' (vs. 'exemplary') Melanesian languages". In Baldi, Philip (ed.). Patterns of Change – Change of Patterns: Linguistic Change and Reconstruction Methodology. Berlin: Mouton de Gruyter. pp. 109–128. doi:10.1515/9783110871890. ISBN 978-3-11-013405-6.
- —— (1992). "How Do Languages Change? (More on 'Aberrant' Languages)". Oceanic Linguistics. 31 (1). University of Hawai'i Press: 115–130. ISSN 0029-8115. JSTOR 3622968.

=== Collaborations ===
- Kroeber, A. L.; Grace, George William (1960). The Sparkman Grammar of Luiseño. Berkeley: University of California Press.
- Wray, Alison; —— (2007). "The consequences of talking to strangers: Evolutionary corollaries of socio-cultural influences on linguistic form". Lingua. 117 (3): 543–578. doi:10.1016/j.lingua.2005.05.005.

== See also ==
- Austronesian languages
- Malcolm Ross (linguist)
- The Oceanic Languages
- Proto-Oceanic language
- Robert Henry Codrington
- Sidney Herbert Ray
- Terry Crowley (linguist)
