= BQB =

BQB or bqb may refer to:

- BQB Líneas Aéreas, a defunct Uruguayan airline based in Montevideo
- BQB, the IATA code for Busselton Margaret River Airport, Yalyalup, Western Australia
- bqb, the ISO 639-3 code for Bagusa language, Papua, Indonesia
