= Trimuris language =

Language in Papua

Trimuris
- Native to: Indonesia
- Region: Papua
- Native speakers: (300 cited 1999)
- Language family: Foja Range: Kwerbic; Nuclear Kwerba; Trimuris

Language codes
- ISO 639-3: tip
- Glottolog: trim1239

Trimuris is a Papuan language of Indonesia.
