= Kwerba language =

Papuan language spoken in Indonesia

Kwerba
- Sasawa
- Native to: Indonesia
- Region: Sarmi Regency, Papua
- Native speakers: (2,500 cited 1996)
- Language family: Foja Range: Kwerbic; Nuclear Kwerba; Kwerba
- Dialects: Serikenam; Sasawa; Nogukwabai

Language codes
- ISO 639-3: kwe
- Glottolog: nucl1595

Kwerba is a Papuan language of Indonesia. Alternate names are Armati (Airmati), Koassa, Mataweja, Naibedj, Segar Tor, Tekutameso.

Kwerba is spoken in Apiaweti, Aurime, Munukania, Tatsewalem, and Wamariri villages in Sarmi Regency.

== Phonology ==
Consonants
	Labial	Alveolar	Palatal	Velar
Plosive	p pʷ	t	tʃ	k kʷ
Fricative		s		
Nasal	m mʷ	n	ɲ	ŋ
Approximant	w	r	j	

- The consonants /p k/ can be heard as [ɸ x] intervocalically.
- The plosive and affricate consonants can be aspirated word-finally.
- /s/ sometimes varies to [h] word initially and intervocalically for some speakers.
- /r/ does not occur word-initially.

Vowels
	Front	Central	Back
High	i		u
Near-high	ɪ		
Mid-high	e	ə	o
Mid-low	ɛ		
Low		a	

Stress occurs on the penultimate syllable.

== Pronouns ==
Kwerba nominative pronouns as given in Foley (2018):

		singular	dual	plural
1st person	excl	co	nano’	nino
1st person	incl	co	na’no	neno
2nd person		am	nono	nom
3rd person		iiniim	iinembwano	iinembwa
