= KJA =

KJA or kja may refer to:

- KJA, the IATA code for Krasnoyarsk International Airport, Russia
- KJA, [[Ḳaraite Jews of America]], America
- kja, the ISO 639-3 code for Mlap language, New Guinea
