= Samarokena language =

Language

Samarokena
- Tamaja
- Region: Papua
- Native speakers: (400 cited 1982)
- Language family: Foja Range: Kwerbic; Apauwar Coast; Samarokena

Language codes
- ISO 639-3: tmj
- Glottolog: sama1240

Samarokena (Samarkena, Karfasia, Tamaja ~ Tamaya) is a poorly documented Papuan language spoken in Indonesian Papua.

Samarokena is spoken in Karfasia, Maseb, Samarkena, and Tamaya villages.

Wurm (1975) linked it to the Kwerba languages, but Ross (2005) could not find enough evidence to classify it. Donahue (2002) found that the pronouns correspond closely to those of Airoran, though both are divergent from the Kwerba languages of the interior.
