= Orya–Tor languages =

Language family of Western New Guinea, Indonesia

Orya–Tor
- Geographic distribution: Tor River region, Western New Guinea
- Linguistic classification: Northwest Papuan?: Foja Range (Tor–Kwerba); Orya–Tor
- Subdivisions: Tor; Orya

Language codes
- Glottolog: toro1256

The Orya–Tor languages are a family of just over a dozen Papuan languages spoken in Western New Guinea, Indonesia.

== Classification ==
The Tor family, named after the Tor River, is clearly established. Its closest relative appears to be Orya.

Stephen Wurm (1975) linked Orya and the Tor languages with the Lakes Plain languages, forming a branch of his Trans–New Guinea phylum. Clouse (1997) found no evidence of such a connection. Malcolm Ross (2005) linked them instead with part of another erstwhile branch of TNG in a Tor–Kwerba proposal, and Usher makes a broadly similar proposal. Glottolog accepts only the link with Orya as having been demonstrated.

== Languages ==
=== Foley (2018) ===
Foley (2018) provides the following classification.

- Tor
  - Orya (Uria / Warpok / Warpu)
  - Sause (Seuce) (?)
  - - Berik (Upper Tor)
    - Itik
    - Kwesten
    - Mander [not a distinct language]
    - Dineor (Maremgi)
    - Wares [doesn't exist]
    - - Bonerif (Benaraf / Edwas – not the same language)
      - Dabe
      - Jofotek-Bromnya
      - Keijar (Keder)
      - Kwinsu (Ansudu)
      - - Betaf (Tena)
        - Vitou (Takar)

Foley considers the inclusion of Sause within the Tor family to be questionable due to insufficient lexical evidence. See Kapauri–Sause languages.

=== Usher (2020) ===
Timothy Usher provides the following classification:

- Orya – Tor River
  - Orya
  - Tor River
    - Maremgi (Dineor)
    - Edwas (Benaraf)
    - Berik–Bonerif
      - Berik
      - Bonerif
    - East Tor River
      - Jofotek (Mander)
      - Itik
    - Tor Coast
      - Kwesten
      - Dabe
      - Keijar
      - East Tor Coast
        - Kwinsu
        - Fitou–Tena
          - Tena (Betaf)
          - Fitou (Vitou)

Jofotek and Mander are found to be the same language, whereas the ISO conflation of Edwas and Bonerif is found to be spurious. A Wares language is not attested. (The Wares people are not known to have a distinct language, and the language of the village of Wares is Mawes.)

== Proto-language ==
=== Phonemes ===
Usher (2020) reconstructs the consonant inventory tentatively as follows:

*m	*n			
*p	*t	*s	*k	*kʷ
*b	*d	*dz		*gʷ
*w	*ɾ			

The stop *d is marginal and only occurs initially. *ɾ does not occur initially.

*i		*u
*e		*o
*ɛ	*ə	*ɔ
	*a	

=== Pronouns ===
The pronouns Ross reconstructs for proto-Orya–Tor are,

I	*ai	exclusive we	?
I	*ai	inclusive we	*ne
thou	*emei	you	*em
s/he	*je	they	?

Usher (2020) reconstructs the pronouns of the East Tor Coast branch as:

East Tor Coast
	sg	pl
1excl	*ai/ana	*ai-saise (?)
1incl	*ai/ana	*ne-saise (?)
2	*im[i]	*im[i]-saise
3	*dei	*dei-saise

=== Basic vocabulary ===
Some lexical reconstructions by Usher (2020) are:

gloss	Proto-Orya-Tor River	Proto-Tor River	Orya
head	*nəbaɾ	*nəbaɾ	
leaf/hair	*aɾ[ɛ/a][n/ŋ]	*aɾ[ɛ/a][n/ŋ]	ala
eye	*nVwɛ	*nVwɛ	nwe
nose	*masɛ	*masɛ	mase
tongue	*mapəɾ[Vm]	*mafəɾVm	mahal
foot/leg	*ta[g]əna	*ta[g]əna	tana
breast	*mo̝m	*mo̝m	mom
louse	*nɛna	*nɛna	
dog	*gʷəɾa	*gʷəɾa	
pig	*gʷas	*gʷas	
bird	*dzu	*dzu	
egg	*s[u]w[e̝]	*s[u]w[e̝]	
tree/wood	*te̝	*te̝	te
woman/wife	*kʷe̝	*kʷe̝	we
moon	*p[ɛⁱ]n	*fɛⁱn	
water	*pɔ	*fɔ	ho
path	*nVɾ	*nVɾ	
name	*bo̝s[ɛ/a]	*bo̝s[ɛ/a]	bose
one	*apa	*afa	
two	*nawɛt	*nawɛt	
