= KIQ =

KIQ or kiq may refer to:

- Kira Airport (IATA: KIQ), Papua New Guinea; see List of airports by IATA airport code: K
- Kosare language (ISO 639-3: kiq), a Papuan language of West Papua
- KiQ, a Philippine Mobile Virtual Network Operator owned by Smart Communications.
