= Kauwera language =

Kwerbic language spoken in Indonesia

Kauwera, Kabera
- Native to: Indonesia
- Region: Papua
- Native speakers: (400 cited 1987)
- Language family: Foja Range: Kwerbic; Nuclear Kwerba; Kauwera, Kabera

Language codes
- ISO 639-3: xau
- Glottolog: kauw1242

Kauwera is a Papuan language of Indonesia.
