= Gresi language =

Papuan language

Gresi
- Region: New Guinea
- Native speakers: (2,500 cited 1987)
- Language family: Foja Range: Nimboran; Kemtuik–Gresi; Gresi

Language codes
- ISO 639-3: grs
- Glottolog: gres1240

Gresi (Geresi, Glesi, Gresik, Klesi) is a Papuan language of Kemtuk Gresi and South Gresi districts in Jayapura Regency, Indonesia. It is very close to Kemtuik. Gresi is spoken in Bring, Hawa, Ibub, Klaysu, Sunna, Tabangkwari, and Yansu villages (Ethnologue).
