= Kaure–Kosare languages =

Language family

Kaure–Kosare
- Nawa River
- Geographic distribution: Nawa River, New Guinea
- Linguistic classification: a primary language family
- Subdivisions: Kaure; Kosare

Language codes
- Glottolog: kaur1274
- Map: The Kaure–Kapori languages of New Guinea The Kaure–Kapori languages Trans–New Guinea languages Other Papuan languages Austronesian languages Uninhabited

The Kaure–Kosare or Nawa River languages are a small family spoken along the Nawa River in West Papua, near the northern border with Papua New Guinea. The languages are Kaure and Kosare.

== Classification ==
Kaure and Kosare (Kosadle) are clearly related. There is a history of classifying them with the Kapori–Sause languages. However, Kapori and Sause show no particular connection to the Kaure languages, and may be closer to Kwerba.

Foley (2018) considers a connection with Trans-New Guinea to be promising, but tentatively leaves Kaure-Kosare out as an independent language family pending further evidence.

== Proto-language ==
=== Phonemes ===
Usher (2020) reconstructs the consonant inventory as follows:

*m	*n			
*p	*t		*k	
*b			*g	
	*s			*h
*w	*ɽ	[*j]		

Coda consonants are stop *C (or more precisely *P) and nasal *N.

*i		*u
*e		*o
*ɛ		*ɔ
*æ	*a	

Diphthongs are *ɛi, *ɛu, *ai *au.

=== Pronouns ===
Usher (2020) reconstructs the pronouns as:

	sg	pl
1	*no (?), *na-	*wɛN
2	*ha-(nɛ)	?
3	?	?

=== Basic vocabulary ===
Some lexical reconstructions by Usher (2020) are:

gloss	Proto-Nawa River
hair	*haⁱ
ear	*hwɔkɽuC
eye	*hwe̝N
tusk/tooth	*pakaⁱ
skin/bark	*ki
breast	*muN
louse	*miN
dog	*se̝
pig	*pî
bird	*ho̝C
tree	*tɛⁱC
woman	*naⁱ
sun	*h[æ/a]niC
moon	*paka
water	*mi[jɛ]
fire	*sa(-[n/ɽ]ɛN)
eat	*naⁱ

== Vocabulary comparison ==
The following basic vocabulary words are from Voorhoeve (1971, 1975) and other sources, as cited in the Trans-New Guinea database.

The words cited constitute translation equivalents, whether they are cognate (e.g. poka, paka for “moon”) or not (e.g. goklu, huaglüt, kɔro for “ear”).

gloss	Kaure	Kosare	Narau
head	kasera; pleŋ; pɔklai	potɔ´	
hair	hai; hat	potɔi	fukura hai
ear	goklu; huaglüt	'kɔro	
eye	gewe; hwai; hwew	ĩsɛrit	
nose	gopo; hapu	moro 'kakò	
tooth	sbeje; səbokai	pɛki	sebekai
tongue	sremu; sɾumu	pɛrɛ´	
leg	due; duɛ		nue
louse	mi; mĩ	mi	
dog	se	sé	
pig	pi	pi	kandu
bird	hou; hu; ku	o	
egg	hore; te; wale	ho's̪ɛri	
blood	hi; katesa; katsa	ña	
bone	era; laq; loa	'kákò	
skin	aguli; arohei; axlit		
breast	mu; muq	kó kakò	
tree	te; tei; teija	tĩⁿdi	bimesini
man	debla; dido		nepra
woman	dae	ḑɩmɔ'kasia	
sky	lɛbü	nubɷ	
sun	hafei; haɾi; harei	ɛnɛ´ⸯ	kaberja
moon	gaka; poka	paka	
water	bi; biq; gomesi	biɛ	bi
fire	sa; saʔ; sareŋ	sá	sare
stone	təsi; tɛsi; tisi	'naka	
road, path	selu	kɛmɔrɔ´	
name	bəre; blɛ; nokomne	morɔ	
eat	ganasi; kadi; kandɛ	kɛnɛ´	kanaisini
one	gogotia; kauxjaʔ; kaxotia	kora'ɸɛ	
two	tɾapli; təravərei; trapi	tau	

== See also ==
- Kaure–Kapori languages
