= Kemtuik language =

Foja Range language spoken in New Guinea

Kemtuik
- Region: New Guinea
- Native speakers: (2,500 cited 1987)
- Language family: Foja Range: Nimboran; Kemtuik–Gresi; Kemtuik

Language codes
- ISO 639-3: kmt
- Glottolog: kemt1242

Kemtuik (Kemtuk) is a Papuan language of Kemtuk and Kemtuk Gresi Districts, Jayapura Regency, Indonesia. It is very close to Gresi. It is spoken in Aib, Aimbe, Braso, Mamda, Mamdayawang, Meikari, Merem, Sabeyap, Sabeyap Kecil, Sabron Yaru, Sabransamon, Sekorup, and Yanim villages.
