= John Lynch (linguist) =

Australian-Vanuatuan linguist (1946–2021)

John Lynch FAHA
- Lynch drinking kava in Port Vila (2015)
- Born: 8 July 1946; Sydney, Australia
- Died: 25 May 2021 (aged 74); Port Vila, Vanuatu
- Citizenship: Australian; Vanuatuan (from 2002)
- Spouse: Andonia Piau (died 2011)
- Children: 2

Academic background
- Education: University of Hawaiʻi
- Thesis: Lenakel Phonology (1974)
- Doctoral advisor: George W. Grace

Academic work
- Discipline: Linguistics
- Sub-discipline: Historical linguistics; Oceanic languages
- Institutions: University of Papua New Guinea; University of the South Pacific
- Notable works: The Oceanic Languages

John Dominic Lynch FAHA (8 July 1946 – 25 May 2021) was an Australian-Vanuatuan linguist who specialised in the historical development of the Oceanic languages. He was a professor at the University of Papua New Guinea for over twenty years and elected its vice chancellor in 1986 before finishing his career at the University of the South Pacific in Port Vila, Vanuatu. Retiring at the end of 2007, he was made professor emeritus of his named chair in Pacific languages in a rare honour bestowed by the university. While at the University of the South Pacific, Lynch served as the director of the Pacific Languages Unit, an association dedicated to the research and promotion of languages in the Pacific. He also served as chief editor of Oceanic Linguistics for twelve years following the resignation of Byron Bender.

Born in Sydney to an Irish Catholic family, Lynch attended the University of Sydney on a Commonwealth Scholarship, originally majoring in anthropology. He later joined the honours linguistics program, studying under the Aboriginal languages expert Arthur Capell. After receiving a grant from the East–West Center, Lynch earned his doctorate from the University of Hawaiʻi under the tutelage of George W. Grace after conducting fieldwork on the Lenakel language of Tanna in southern Vanuatu. Throughout his career, he was known as a gifted writer and administrator. His work in education earned him several honours, including Vanuatu's Independence Anniversary Medal and Papua New Guinea's Anniversary Medal. Following his retirement, he was made a Fellow of the Australian Academy of the Humanities.

== Early life and education ==
John Dominic Lynch was born on 8 July 1946 in Sydney, Australia, the eldest of five sons born to Dorothy Patricia "Pat" (née Conaghan), a high school music teacher, and Gregory Lynch, a chemical engineer; both Pat's and Gregory's families were Irish Catholic immigrants to Australia. In 1958, the family moved from Wahroonga, a suburb north of Sydney, to Melbourne. There, John attended Xavier College, a boarding school run by the Society of Jesus, during which he studied Latin, French, and Ancient Greek. Although German was not available as a class, he began teaching himself the language. Eventually, he was able to pass the final exam after being tutored by a native speaker – the Austrian wife of one of his schoolteachers.

In 1964, Lynch began attending the University of Sydney on a Commonwealth Scholarship. Although he was on track to receive an undergraduate degree in anthropology, he joined the honours linguistics program where at one point he was the only student enrolled. His only linguistics professor in the program was Arthur Capell, a specialist in the Aboriginal languages of Australia and the languages of the Pacific. Lynch completed his anthropology degree with a first-class honours distinction in linguistics four years later.

Following his graduation, Lynch received a grant from the East–West Center to continue his doctoral studies at the University of Hawaiʻi in Honolulu. His thesis focused on Lenakel, a language indigenous to the island of Tanna in southern Vanuatu, and provided a descriptive and historical account of the language's phonology. Kickstarted by some of Capell's research, Lynch's dissertation was based on the research undertaken as the result of five expeditions he made to the island beginning in 1969. Lynch completed his doctoral program in 1974 under the American linguist George W. Grace.

== Career ==
While working on his doctorate, Lynch began working at the University of Papua New Guinea. In 1969, the Australian linguist Andrew Pawley helped to establish an undergraduate linguistics program there as a part of the nascent anthropology and sociology department. The following year, Lynch assumed Pawley's position there following his departure. During this period, Lynch both taught at the University of Papua New Guinea and took classes back in Hawaii while writing his dissertation.

In 1974, Lynch assumed the chief editing role at the academic journal Kivung (now Language and Linguistics in Melanesia), published by the Linguistic Society of Papua New Guinea. The same year, the university created a department of language, appointing Lynch senior lecturer two years later. He was granted a full professorship in 1978, teaching up to seventeen hours per week, and resigned as chief editor of Kivung; he later served as a reviewing editor for the journal from 1982 to 1986. Recognised for his talent in administration, Lynch was made dean of arts for several years before being made vice chancellor in 1986. From then on until his death in 2021, he continued to be involved in Kivung's editorial process, either as an associate editor or as a member of the journal's editorial board. Prior to his promotion, Lynch anonymously penned a newsletter throughout his career at the university, entitled Moving Finger, in which he satirised the university's bureaucracy and internal politics. It is unclear whether it was known he was the author when he was appointed to the chancellorship. Between 1985 and 1988, Lynch and the English-Australian linguist Terry Crowley were funded by UNESCO to organise workshops for language development throughout Melanesia, culminating in a course book entitled Communication and Language published in 1988.

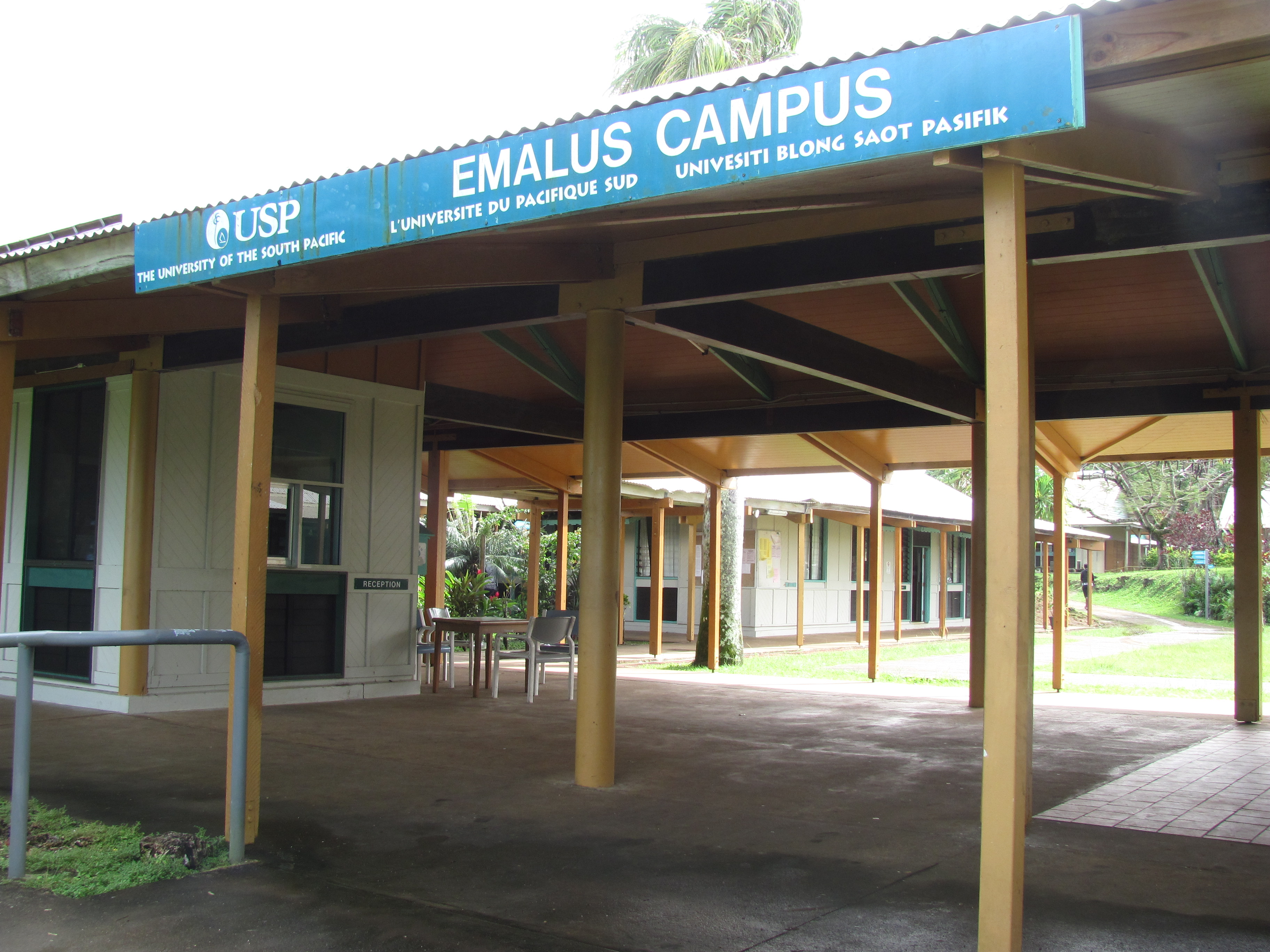
Lynch began working at the University of the South Pacific's Emalus campus in Port Vila, Vanuatu, in 1991.

At the end of 1991, Lynch left Papua New Guinea to begin work at the University of the South Pacific's Emalus campus; he and his family moved to Port Vila, Vanuatu. Lynch was appointed to the directorship of the university's Pacific Languages Unit, an organisation for the research and promotion of Pacific languages, shortly before his arrival following Crowley's resignation from the position. Lynch was honoured with a personal chair in 1995, as professor of the Pacific languages. The same year, he was made head of the Emalus campus and served in that capacity until his retirement in 2007. In 2002, Lynch was granted Vanuatuan citizenship.

== Final years and death ==
Shortly before his retirement, Lynch was approached by Byron Bender to become the editor of the academic journal Oceanic Linguistics after Bender signalled his intention to resign in 2006. Bender had originally sought out Robert Blust, who declined, and then reached out to Andrew Pawley. Pawley also declined, but strongly recommended Lynch for the position. Bender and Lynch co-edited one 2006 issue together, and Lynch remained chief editor from 2007 to 2019. Lynch retired from the university on New Year's Eve 2007, being given the honour of being named professor emeritus which was a rarity at the University of the South Pacific.

Later in his life, Lynch suffered from serious health problems. In 2014, Lynch experienced congestive heart failure, haematoma, and muscle infections. He was no longer allowed to fly based on his medical issues, which severely limited his ability to conduct research and remain a part of academic life outside Vanuatu. Although these later years had been marked by serious disease, he resolved to stay in Vanuatu rather than return to Australia. Lynch died in Port Vila on 25 May 2021 following a stroke. His funeral was held virtually, due to the COVID-19 pandemic in Vanuatu.

== Recognition and legacy ==
Much of Lynch's best-known work focused on the Oceanic languages.

In 1985, Lynch was honoured by the government of Papua New Guinea with its 10th Anniversary Medal for his contributions to education in the country. In 2008, Lynch was voted a Fellow of the Australian Academy of the Humanities. Eight years later, Vanuatu awarded him the Independence Anniversary Medal during the thirtieth year of its independence in honour of his contributions to "linguistics, language studies, and tertiary education". Lynch's work heavily focused on the languages of Vanuatu; nearly 70 of his 125 articles dealt with the topic, much of it focused on their history, taxonomy, and archaeological evidence. Apart from that work, he wrote about the morphological development and pidgins of the region.

Among his best-known works are his monograph Pacific Languages: An Introduction (1998) and The Oceanic Languages (2002), which was coauthored with Malcolm Ross and Crowley. His 1998 monograph was highly regarded and saw use as a university textbook for decades after its release; it has been used in this capacity by hundreds of students as recently as 2021 at the University of the South Pacific. The Oceanic Languages provides an overview of forty-three Oceanic languages and the languages' last common ancestor, Proto-Oceanic. It remains a standard reference work among scholars of the languages, who often refer to it simply as "the blue book". Lynch was highly regarded for his writing ability; coauthors commented that his first drafts were usually indistinguishable from his final drafts and that he used plain language whenever possible, which he felt would make himself better understood.

== Personal life ==
Lynch was married to Andonia "Andy" (née Piau), an educational psychologist, with whom he had two sons: Brendan and Steven. She died of cancer in 2011. At one point, Andy was Vanuatu's only psychologist with a degree and was an advocate for women's rights in the country. Following her death, Lynch worked with the Australian High Commission in Vanuatu to establish the Andy Lynch Award for Excellence in the Community Sector. Issued on International Women's Day to recognise women working in community service and disability advocacy, the award honours Andy's later work as an advocate for disability rights in Vanuatu. Lynch remained heavily involved in the selection process until 2020.

Lynch was well-known by friends as a fan of cricket. While in Honolulu, he played for the local team at Kapiʻolani Park alongside other international players. One of his sons, Steven, is a Vanuatuan cricket player who has represented the nation in international tournaments.

Along with many of his friends, Lynch enjoyed drinking beverages made from kava, a plant with mild psychoactive qualities. He consumed it with some regularity, even until a few days before his death. Aside from his native English, Lynch spoke Lenakel, Aneityum, Tok Pisin, Bislama, and French.

== Selected works ==
=== Articles ===
- "Those kind of adjectives" (1973)
- "Bislama Phonology and Grammar" (1975)
- "A Note on Proto-Oceanic Vowels" (1976)
- "On the Kuman 'Liquids'" (1982)
- "A century of linguistic change in Anejom" (1991)
- "On the Origin of Tok Pisin na" (1994)
- "On the Relative Instability of *tina- 'Mother' in the Languages of Eastern Oceania" (1996)
- "The Phonological History of Iaai" (2015)
- "Numeral Systems, Internal Subgrouping, and Language Contact in Malakula" (2016)
- "The Proto-Oceanic Common Article in Southwestern Malakula Languages" (2017)
- "Final Consonants and the Status of Proto-North-Central Vanuatu" (2018)
- "The Phonological History of Naman, a Western Malakula Language" (2019)
- "The Phonological History of Nese, a Northern Malakula Language" (2019)
- "The Phonological History of Uripiv, an Eastern Malakula Language" (2020)
- "Homophony of Subject Markers in the Languages of Tanna (Vanuatu)" (2020)

=== Books ===
- Lenakel Phonology (1974), dissertation
- The Design of Language: An Introduction to Descriptive Linguistics (1995)
- Pacific Languages: An Introduction (1998)
- A Grammar of Anejom̃ (2000)
- The Linguistic History of Southern Vanuatu (2001)
- Languages of Vanuatu: A New Survey and Bibliography (2001, with Terry Crowley)
- The Oceanic Languages (2002, with Malcolm Ross and Terry Crowley)
