= Orya =

Orya may refer to:

- Orya (play), an ancient Greek comedy by Epicharmus
- Orya (centipede), a genus of centipedes
- Orya language, a language of West Papua, Indonesia (not to be confused with the Oriya language of India)
- Orya, ISO 15924 code for the Odia alphabet of India

== People with the name ==
- Orya Maqbool Jan, Pakistani columnist
- Roberts Orya, Nigerian banker

== See also ==
- Oriya (disambiguation), topics related to Orissa, India
- Oria (disambiguation)
