= Orya language =

One of Tor-Kwerba languages in Papua

Orya
- Native to: Indonesia
- Region: West Papua
- Native speakers: (1,600 cited 1985)
- Language family: Foja Range (Tor–Kwerba): Orya–Tor; Orya

Language codes
- ISO 639-3: ury
- Glottolog: orya1242

Orya (Oria, or erroneously Uria) is a Papuan language spoken in Indonesia. Warpok is the Nimboran name.

== Phonology ==
Consonants:
		Labial	Alveolar	Palatal	Velar	Glottal
Nasal		m	n		ŋ	
Plosive	voiceless		t		k	ʔ
Plosive	voiced	b	d	ʤ	ɡ	ʔ
Fricative	voiceless		s			h
Fricative	voiced		z			
Liquid			l			
Semivowel		w		j		

Vowels:
	Front	Central	Back
Open	i	ɨ	u
Mid	e		o
Mid	æ		
Close	a		
