= Helen Groger-Wurm =

Austrian-Australian ethnologist

Helen Groger-Wurm, birth name Helene Gröger (1921–2005), was an Austrian-Australian ethnologist, anthropologist and linguist. After earning a Ph.D. from the University of Vienna in 1946, she married the Hungarian-born linguist Stefan Wurm. In 1954 the couple moved to Australia where they obtained Australian citizenship. They carried out field research in New Guinea and in northern Australia. From 1962 until her 1974, Groger-Wurm was a research officer (also co-founder) at the Australian Institute of Aboriginal Studies, lecturing in parallel on the Aboriginal way of life at the Australian National University. She went on to take up work a librarian at the Australian National Library until her retirement in 1982. She is remembered in particular for her work in connection with Aboriginal bark painting.

== Early life and education ==
Born on 21 February 1921 in Vienna, Austria, Helene Gröger was the daughter of the bank employee Wilhelm Emanuel Gröger and his wife Antonia née Vecera. After completing her gymnasium schooling, from 1940 she studied ethnology combined with African languages and Egyptology at the University of Vienna. In 1946, she earned a Ph.D. with a dissertation titled Die Musikinstrumente im Kult der Afrikaner (Musical instruments in African culture).

In May 1946, she married the Hungarian linguist Stefan Wurm and accompanied him to London where she took a post-graduate course in social anthropology under Raymond Firth at the London School of Economics.

== Career ==
In 1954, the couple emigrated to Australia where Stefan had been invited to teach at the University of Sydney. In 1955 and 1956, together with her husband, she undertook anthropological visits to the native peoples of New South Wales and Southern Queensland, recording their indigenous languages. Helen worked there as an administrative assistant until 1956 when she moved with her husband to Canberra as he had been engaged as senior fellow in the department of anthropology and sociology. In December 1957, they both obtained Australian citizenship. They carried out field research in New Guinea in 1958. In 1961, Groger-Wurm and her husband were among the founders of the Australian Institute of Aboriginal Studies. From 1965 to 1974 she worked at the institute, compiling collections from various ethnic groups as she accompanied her husband on field trips, making frequent visits to northern Australia. Working for the Australian Institute of Anatomy, she systematically catalogued the items she had collected. In 1973, she published Australian Aboriginal Bark Paintings and their Mythological Interpretation based on the sacred art of Eastern Arnhem Land.

While her husband was interested principally in the languages of the indigenous peoples they visited, Groger-Wurm documented the material aspects of their development and culture. Each year she spent some four months on field trips, devoting the rest of her time to lecturing on aboriginal culture, in particular by giving evening courses at the Australian National University's Department of Adult Education. Until her retirement in 1982, she worked as a librarian at the National Library of Australia in Canberra.

Helen Groger-Wurm died on 18 September 2005 in Canberra. She is remembered today as a significant contributor to our understanding of the material culture of Australian aborigines.
