= Bagusa language =

Papuan language of Indonesia

Bagusa
- Native to: Indonesia
- Region: Papua
- Native speakers: (300 cited 1987)
- Language family: Foja Range: Kwerbic; Nuclear Kwerba; Bagusa

Language codes
- ISO 639-3: bqb
- Glottolog: bagu1251

Bagusa is a Papuan language of Indonesia.
