= Kaure–Kapori languages =

Obsolete language classification

Kaure–Kapori is an obsolete language-classification proposal that linked two language families,

- Kapauri–Sause languages
- Kaure–Kosare languages

Despite a history of linking these two families, there is no evidence for any particular connection. Foley (2018) considers the evidence linking Kaure with Kapauri to be insufficient, and considers Kapauri to be an isolate.
