= Oria language =

Oria may be an alternative spelling for:

- Oriya language (India), an Indo-Aryan language spoken in the state of Odisha (Orissa) in India
- Orya language (New Guinea), a Papuan language spoken in Indonesian part of the New Guinea island
