= Mlap language =

Language in Papua

Mlap
- Kwansu
- Region: New Guinea
- Native speakers: (300 cited 2000)
- Language family: Foja Range: Nimboran; Mlap

Language codes
- ISO 639-3: kja
- Glottolog: mlap1238
- ELP: Mlap

Mlap, or Kwansu (obsolete), is a Papuan language of Indonesia. It is spoken just to the west of Lake Sentani.
