= Oriya =

Oriya (also spelled Odia) may refer to:

- Odia people in India
- Odia language, an Indian language, belonging to the Indo-Aryan branch of the Indo-European language family
- Odia script, a writing system used for the Oriya language
  - Oriya (Unicode block), a block of Oriya characters in Unicode

== See also ==
- Orya (disambiguation)
- Odia (disambiguation)
- Oria (disambiguation)
