= Northwest Papuan languages =

Proposed language family of Papuan languages

Northwest Papuan
- Northwest New Guinea
- (proposed)
- Geographic distribution: Papua Province, Indonesia
- Subdivisions: Fas; Sentani; Border (Upper Tami); Sko; Foja Range (Tor–Kwerba–Nimboran)

Language codes
- ISO 639-3: –
- Glottolog: None

The Northwest Papuan languages are a proposed language family of Papuan languages.

Many of the constituent branches of Northwest Papuan were first proposed to be related by H.K.J. Cowan in the 1950s. Voorhoeve (1971) connected the Border and Tor families. Using only pronouns as a diagnostic, Malcolm Ross linked most of the western (Foja Range) branch of the family, which is now fairly secure. The current form of the proposal was worked out by Timothy Usher under the name "North(west) New Guinea" (not to be confused with the proposed North New Guinea branch of the Austronesian language family). It is not yet certain, however, that the similarities in vocabulary between Foja Range and the other constituent families are due to inheritance rather than borrowing.

== Languages ==
- Fas
- Sentani
- Border (Upper Tami)
- Sko
- Foja Range
  - Nimboran
  - Kwerbic
  - Mawes
  - Orya–Tor

The western branch, Foja Range, is equivalent to Ross's Tor–Kwerba family with the addition of Nimboran.

Søren Wichmann (2013) considers Nimboran, Kapauri (under Kwerbic above), Border, and possibly also Elseng (under Border above) to form a unified language family.
