= D'Auria =

- David D'Auria, a Welsh football midfielder
- Francesco D'Auria, an Italian conductor, composer, and music educator
- Girolamo D'Auria, Italian sculptor
- Gregory D’Auria, an American lawyer and judge
- Joey D'Auria, an American actor and a voice actor
- Tippy D'Auria, the founder of the Winter Star Party
- De Auria, Italian family

== See also ==
- Auria (disambiguation)
