= Edwas language =

Foja Range language spoken in Indonesia

Edwas
- Beneraf
- Native to: Indonesia
- Region: West Papua
- Native speakers: 200 (2005)
- Language family: Foja Range (Tor–Kwerba): Orya–Tor; Tor; Edwas

Language codes
- ISO 639-3: bnv (all language codes used for both Edwas / Beneraf and Bonerif)
- Glottolog: bone1255

Edwas, or Beneraf, is a Papuan language of Indonesia. "Edwas", the name of a former village, is the native name; "Beneraf", the name of one of two current villages, is what the neighboring peoples and previously the Dutch use(d) for them. The ISO 639 standard confuses it with Bonerif, another language in the same family.
