= Kapauri–Sause languages =

Kwerbic language family of Indonesia

Kapauri–Sause
- Geographic distribution: New Guinea
- Linguistic classification: Foja Range: Kwerbic; Kapauri–Sause
- Subdivisions: Kapauri; Sause

Language codes
- Glottolog: None

The Kapauri–Sause (Kapori–Sause) languages form a small language family spoken along the middle Taritatu River in the Jayapura Regency of Papua, Indonesia. They are two languages, Kapauri (Kapori) and Sause, which are not particularly close.

== Classification ==
There is a history of linking at least Kapauri to the Kaure languages (see Kaure–Kapori languages). However, they show no particular affiliation, and Kapauri appears to be closer to Kwerba. Usher demonstrated a connection instead with another erstwhile isolate, Sause, together forming a branch of Kwerbic. A partial reconstruction of proto-Kapauri–Sause can be found there.

== Proto-language ==
=== Phonemes ===
Usher (2020) reconstructs the consonant inventory as follows. Apparent gaps may be due to poverty of data (e.g., there are /p/, /ɸ/ and /ɡ/ in the languages, but as of 2020 they have not been reconstructed for the protolanguage):

*m	*n			
	*t	*s	*k	
*b				
*w	*ɽ	*j		*h

*i		*u
*e	*ɵ	*o
*ɛ		
	*a [*aː]	

=== Pronouns ===
Pronouns are reconstructed as follow.

	proto-KS	Kapauri	Sause
1SG	*ka	kaku	aʔ
2SG	*ɵ	u	e
3SG	*aɾ̃oC	aːnuʔ	arok
1PL	*ne	aɽuʔ	ne

=== Basic vocabulary ===
Some lexical reconstructions by Usher (2020) are:

gloss	Proto-Kapauri-Sause
head	*baːɽ
ear	*t[o̝/u]waro̝
tooth	*w₂ano̝
tongue	*mɛn₂o̝
blood	*ko̝mo̝
bone	*aːᵘC
breast	*mɵ̝N
louse	*hɛno̝
dog	*unu
bird	*ɽe̝Cne̝N
egg	*huwini
sun	*nisiki (?)
moon	*bɛ[N/nV]
water/river	*bo̝C
path	*nawaɽo̝
eat	*na[N/nV]
two	*nɛbɽe̝[na]
