= Arthur Capell =

Australian priest and linguist (1902–1986)

- Capell in his 1970 Festschrift
- Born: 18 March 1902; Newtown, Australia
- Died: 10 August 1986 (aged 84); Gordon, Australia

Academic background
- Education: School of Oriental and African Studies
- Thesis: The Linguistic Position of South Eastern Papua (1938)

Academic work
- Discipline: Linguistics
- Sub-discipline: Australian languages; Austronesian languages; Papuan languages
- Notable students: John Lynch

Arthur Capell (28 March 1902 – 10 August 1986) was an Australian linguist and Anglican priest, who made major contributions to the study of Australian languages, Austronesian languages and Papuan languages.

== Early life ==
Capell was born in Newtown, New South Wales, in 1902, the only child of Sarah Ann (née Scott) and her husband, Henry Capell. He attended North Sydney Boys High School.

== Career ==
Capell graduated from the Sydney Teachers' College in Modern Languages in 1922 and the University of Sydney in the same year as the University medallist in Classics. He taught in high schools for three years at Canterbury Boys' Intermediate High and Tamworth High School. He was then ordained deacon in 1925 and priest in 1926 in the Church of England in Australia. He worked in Newcastle for a decade, as Curate, St Peter's, Hamilton (1926–1928); Priest-in-Charge, All Saints, Belmont (1928–1929); as a teacher at Broughton School for Boys in Newcastle (1929–1932), where he was introduced to the anthropologist and priest A. P. Elkin; and as Curate to Elkin at St James' Church, Morpeth (1932–1935).

He pursued his linguistic studies privately, but went on to obtain a master's degree in Classics at the University of Sydney (1931). Encouraged by Elkin, he undertook a doctoral programme at the University of London in 1935, and graduating the following year with a PhD from the School of Oriental and African Studies, with a thesis on The linguistic position of south-eastern Papua, which was published in book form in 1943. His primary interest was the languages of the Pacific and of New Guinea, and he is said to have regarded his research of Aboriginal languages to be a matter of weekend work, though he did spend lengthy periods doing fieldwork in both the Kimberleys and Arnhem Land.

When Elkin, then the Anglican rector at Morpeth, was appointed to a professorship in anthropology at Sydney, Capell served as his locum tenens in the parish. On vacations back in Morpeth, Elkin was impressed by Capell's linguistic gifts, and eventually arranged a lectureship in linguistics for him in 1945. He was appointed reader in 1948, and remained in that position until retirement in 1967. He was made an honorary canon of Ss Peter and Paul Cathedral, Dogura, in 1956.

Notwithstanding his extensive work on Papuan and Polynesian languages, including dictionaries of Fijian, Palauan and Western Futuna, Capell managed to make important contributions to Australian linguistics, particularly in discovering typologically distinct north-western languages which could not be assimilated to the standard Pama-Nyungan language family.

== Personal life ==
Capell was fond of punning, an example being his pronunciation of semantics as "some antics". When his housekeeper fell ill, he hired another to care for her and, when the second in turn fell ill, Capell looked after both of them.

He died in 1986, aged 84. He was unmarried.

== Legacy ==
The University of Sydney awards an annual prize in Capell's name for an essay on Australian and Pacific Linguistics.

The Australian Museum holds the Capell Collection of Solomon Islands Photographs. Capell's records have been digitised and deposited with the National Library of Australia. In some cases, his papers are the only surviving record of lost languages.

Capell House at Northholm Grammar School in Arcadia, New South Wales, is named after him.

== See also ==
- M.A.K. Halliday
- Stephen Wurm

== Bibliography ==
- Capell, Arthur (1954). A linguistic survey of the south-west Pacific. Nouméa, New Caledonia: South Pacific Commission. OCLC 4048027.
- Capell, Arthur (1962). A linguistic survey of the south-west Pacific (New and Revised ed.). Nouméa, New Caledonia: South Pacific Commission. OCLC 2584664.
