= Kosare language =

Language in Papua

Kosadle
- Kosare
- Region: Papua: west of the Nawa River and Idenburg River confluence
- Native speakers: (250 cited 1993)
- Language family: Kaure–Kosare: Kosadle

Language codes
- ISO 639-3: kiq
- Glottolog: kosa1251
- ELP: Kosadle

Kosadle (Kosare) is a Papuan language of West Papua.
