= Robert Blust =

American linguist (1940–2022)

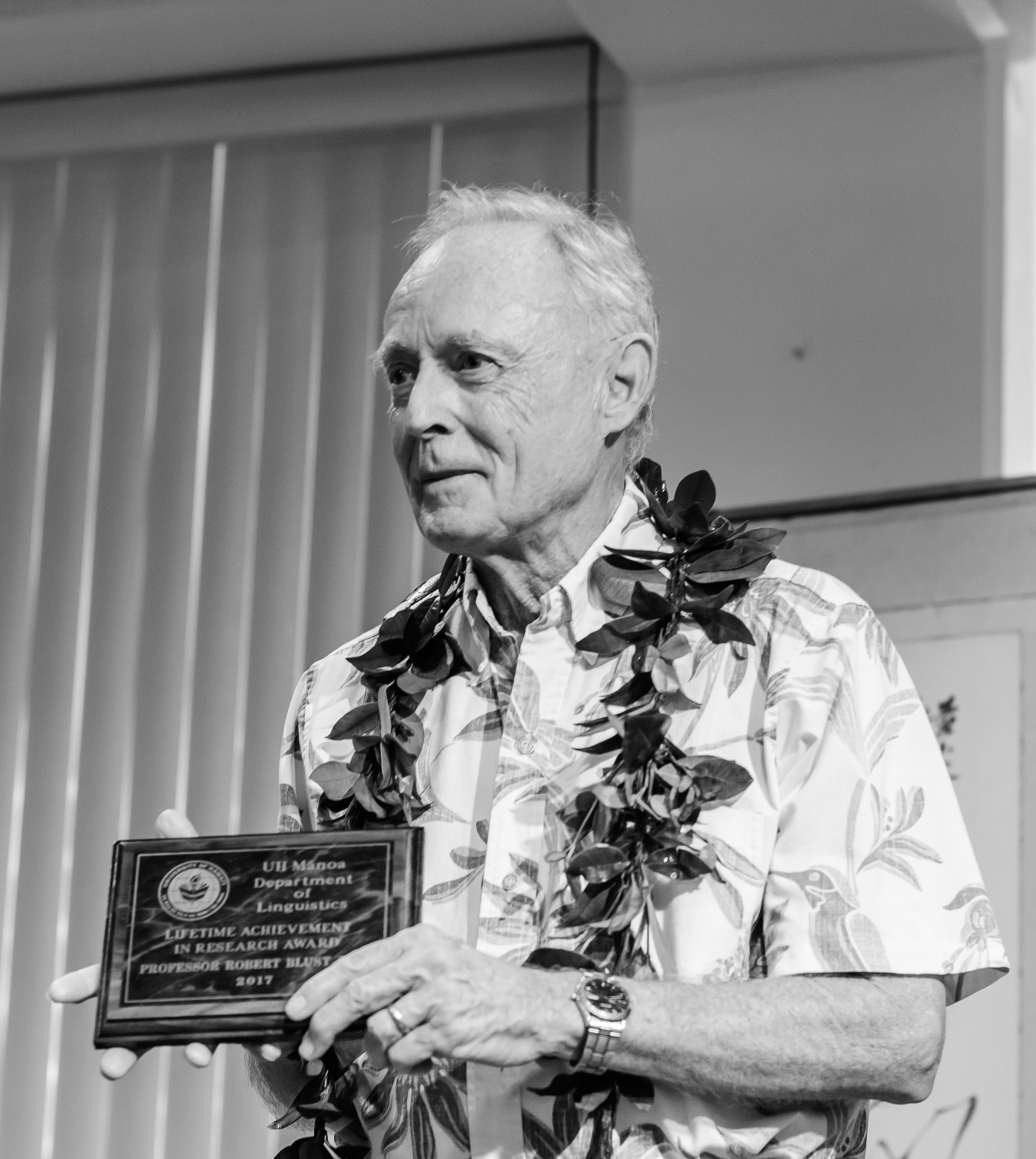
- Blust in 2017
- Born: Robert Andrew Blust; May 9, 1940; Cincinnati, Ohio, U.S.
- Died: January 5, 2022 (aged 81); Honolulu, Hawaii, U.S.
- Other name: Bái Lèsī (白樂思)

Academic background
- Education: University of Hawaiʻi at Mānoa (BA, MA, PhD)
- Thesis: The Proto–North Sarawak Vowel Deletion Hypothesis (1974)
- Doctoral advisor: George W. Grace

Academic work
- Institutions: University of Hawaiʻi at Mānoa, Leiden University
- Notable students: K. Alexander Adelaar

Chinese name
- Traditional Chinese: 白樂思
Transcriptions
Standard Mandarin
- Hanyu Pinyin: Bái Lèsī
- Website: www.ling.hawaii.edu/faculty/blust/

Robert Andrew Blust (/blʌst/; Chinese: 白樂思; pinyin: Bái Lèsī; May 9, 1940 – January 5, 2022) was an American linguist who worked in several areas, including historical linguistics, lexicography and ethnology. He was Professor of Linguistics at the University of Hawaiʻi at Mānoa. Blust specialized in the Austronesian languages and made major contributions to the field of Austronesian linguistics.

== Early life and career ==
Blust was born in Cincinnati, Ohio on May 9, 1940. He was raised in California. He received both a Bachelor of Arts in anthropology in 1967 and a PhD in linguistics in 1974 from the University of Hawaiʻi at Mānoa. He taught at Leiden University in the Netherlands from 1976 to 1984, after which he returned to the Department of Linguistics at Mānoa for the rest of his career, serving as department chair from 2005 to 2008. He was a Fellow of the Linguistic Society of America.

=== Austronesian languages ===
Until 2018, he served as the review editor for Oceanic Linguistics, an academic journal that covers the Austronesian languages. Blust is best known for his work on this large language family, including the comprehensive Austronesian Comparative Dictionary (1995) and a Thao-English dictionary (2003). Another one of his well-known works is a 2009 work called The Austronesian Languages, which is the first single-authored book to cover all aspects (phonology, syntax, morphology, sound changes, classification, etc.) of the Austronesian language family in its entirety.

=== Field work ===
As part of his field work, Blust studied 97 Austronesian languages spoken in locations such as Sarawak, Papua New Guinea, and Taiwan. In Taiwan, he performed field work on Formosan languages such as Thao, Kavalan, Pazeh, Amis, Paiwan and Saisiyat. His dictionary of the highly endangered Thao language, at over 1100 pages, is one of the most complete ever compiled for a Formosan language. Blust also had an abiding research interest in both linguistic and cultural aspects of rainbows and dragons.

== Personal life and death ==
Blust died in Honolulu, Hawaii, on January 5, 2022, at the age of 81, after a 13-year battle with cancer.

== See also ==
- Austronesian Hypothesis

== Selected publications ==
- Blust, Robert (1974). The Proto-North-Sarawak vowel deletion hypothesis (PhD). University of Hawaiʻi at Mānoa.
- Blust, Robert (1977). "The Proto-Austronesian pronouns and Austronesian subgrouping: a preliminary report". University of Hawaiʻi Working Papers in Linguistics. 9 (2): 1–15.
- Blust, Robert (1988). Austronesian Root Theory: An Essay on the Limits of Morphology. John Benjamins Publishing. ISBN 90-272-3020-X.
- Blust, Robert (1993). "*s metathesis and the Formosan/Malayo-Polynesian language boundary". In Dahl, Øyvind (ed.). Language, a Doorway Between Human Cultures: Tributes to Dr. Otto Chr. Dahl on His Ninetieth Birthday. Novus Forlag. ISBN 978-82-7099-205-8.
- Blust, Robert (1995). "The position of the Formosan languages: method and theory in Austronesian comparative linguistics". In Li, Paul Jen-kuei; Tsang, Cheng-hwa; Huang, Ying-kuei; Ho, Dah-an; Tseng, Chiu-yu (eds.). Austronesian Studies Relating to Taiwan. Symposium Series of the Institute of History and Philology. Vol. 3. Taipei: Academia Sinica. pp. 585–650.
- Blust, Robert (December 1996). "Some Remarks on the Linguistic Position of Thao". Oceanic Linguistics. 35 (2). University of Hawaiʻi Press: 272–294. doi:10.2307/3623175. JSTOR 3623175.
- Blust, Robert (1999). "Notes on Pazeh Phonology and Morphology". Oceanic Linguistics. 38 (2). University of Hawaiʻi Press: 321–365. doi:10.2307/3623296. JSTOR 3623296.
- Blust, Robert (2003). "Three Notes on Early Austronesian Morphology". Oceanic Linguistics. 42 (2). University of Hawaiʻi Press: 438–478. doi:10.2307/3623246. JSTOR 3623246.
- Blust, Robert (2003). Thao Dictionary (PDF). Language and Linguistics, Monograph Series A5. Taipei: Institute of Linguistics (Preparatory Office), Academia Sinica. ISBN 978-957-01-4785-8. Archived from the original (PDF) on January 21, 2022.
- Blust, Robert (2003). A short morphology, phonology and vocabulary of Kiput, Sarawak. Shorter Grammars. Canberra: Pacific Linguistics, Research School of Pacific and Asian Studies, Australian National University. doi:10.15144/PL-546. hdl:1885/146714. ISBN 0858835363.
- Blust, Robert A. (2005). "Must sound change be linguistically motivated?". Diachronica. 22 (2). John Benjamins: 219–269. doi:10.1075/dia.22.2.02blu. ISSN 1569-9714.
- Blust, Robert (2006). "The Origin of the Kelabit Voiced Aspirates: A Historical Hypothesis Revisited". Oceanic Linguistics. 45 (2). University of Hawaiʻi Press: 311–338. doi:10.1353/ol.2007.0001. JSTOR 4499967. S2CID 145261116.
- Blust, Robert (2009). The Austronesian languages. Pacific Linguistics, Research School of Pacific and Asian Studies, The Australian National University. ISBN 978-0-85883-602-0.
- Blust, Robert; Trussel, Stephen. "The Austronesian Comparative Dictionary".
- Blust, Robert (2023). The Dragon and the Rainbow: Man's Oldest Story. Brill, Leiden. ISBN 978-90-04-67829-3.
