= Tor River =

River in Papua, Indonesia

- Location within Papua
- Native name: Sungai Tor (Indonesian)

Location
- Country: Indonesia
- Region: Papua

Physical characteristics
- Source
  - location: Indonesia
- Mouth
  - coordinates: 1°57′30″S 138°53′52″E
- Length: 158 km (98 mi)
- Basin size: 1,560 km^{2} (600 sq mi)

The Tor River (Bahasa Indonesia: Sungai Tor) is a river in Western New Guinea with a total length of 158 km (98 mi).

== See also ==
- List of drainage basins of Indonesia
- List of rivers of Western New Guinea
- Tor languages
