= Auria (disambiguation) =

Auria is early Queen consort of Pamplona.

Auria may also refer to:

- Auria (gens), the Roman gens
- Domenico Auria, an Italian architect and sculptor of the Renaissance period

== See also ==
- Aurea (disambiguation)
- D'Auria
