= SS Oria =

Three steamships have borne the name Oria:

- SS Oria (1890) was a 2,167-ton cargo ship launched on 20 March 1890, by Thompson, R., Southwick, Sunderland, England. Renamed Thordal in 1906, torpedoed and sunk by a submarine on 24 July 1917.
- SS Oria (1913) was a 1,845-ton cargo ship launched on 12 September 1913 in Fevig, Norway. Struck a mine and sank off Cape Penas on 23 March 1917.
- SS Oria (1920) was a 2,127-ton cargo ship launched on 17 June 1920, by Osbourne Graham of North Hylton, United Kingdom. Seized by Vichy France in 1941 renamed Sainte Julienne. Returned to owners in 1943. Wrecked off Cape Sounion on 13 February 1944, killing about 4,100 people.
