= Sarmi, Papua =

Sarmi Indonesian: Sarmi
- town
- Location in Western New Guinea
- Coordinates: 01°51′09.4″S 138°45′02.7″E
- Country: Indonesia
- Region: Papua
- Province: Papua
- Regency: Sarmi Regency

Area
  - Total: 419 km^{2} (162 sq mi)

Population (mid 2022 estimate)
  - Total: 14,093
  - Density: 33.6/km^{2} (87.1/sq mi)
- Time zone: UTC+9 (Indonesia Eastern Time)
- Climate: Af

Sarmi is a coastal town and the administrative center of Sarmi Regency in the province of Papua in Indonesia.

== Geography ==
The town resides on the Sarmi Peninsula along the Pacific or north coast of the main island of New Guinea.

The nearby Kumamba Islands are located 10 miles to the north of the Sarmi Peninsula.

== Climate ==
Sarmi has a tropical rainforest climate (Af) with heavy rainfall year-round.

Climate data for Sarmi (2007–2020)
Month	Jan	Feb	Mar	Apr	May	Jun	Jul	Aug	Sep	Oct	Nov	Dec	Year
Mean daily maximum °C (°F)	31.2 (88.2)	31.1 (88.0)	31.3 (88.3)	31.5 (88.7)	31.5 (88.7)	31.1 (88.0)	30.7 (87.3)	31.0 (87.8)	30.9 (87.6)	31.3 (88.3)	31.6 (88.9)	31.5 (88.7)	31.2 (88.2)
Mean daily minimum °C (°F)	23.0 (73.4)	22.7 (72.9)	23.4 (74.1)	22.9 (73.2)	23.4 (74.1)	23.4 (74.1)	23.2 (73.8)	23.2 (73.8)	23.5 (74.3)	23.2 (73.8)	23.5 (74.3)	23.6 (74.5)	23.3 (73.9)
Average precipitation mm (inches)	224.3 (8.83)	196.2 (7.72)	208.3 (8.20)	186.3 (7.33)	213.0 (8.39)	217.7 (8.57)	212.0 (8.35)	203.1 (8.00)	174.4 (6.87)	164.7 (6.48)	229.1 (9.02)	285.2 (11.23)	2,514.3 (98.99)
Average precipitation days	13.6	14.4	14.6	11.8	12.4	13.1	12.6	11.8	11.1	10.5	11.9	14.3	152.1
Source: Meteomanz

== Attractions ==
- Pacific Ocean Doro Sarmi Beach.

== Railway ==
In the Papua Railway Development Plan, the province of Papua planned to build a railway connecting Jayapura, Sarmi, Nabire, and finally to connect the first phase of the project in Manokwari, and another branch to connect to Timika. Related issues are still under study. Detailed design and environmental impact studies on the 205 km Sarmi - Jayapura section took place in 2016-17, with land procurement starting in 2018-19, and construction starting after that.

== Administrative villages ==
- Amsira Village
- Bagaiserwar Village
- Liki Village
- Mararena Village
- Sarmi Village
- Sarmo Village
- Sawar Village
- Siaratesa Village

== See also ==
- Sarmi–Jayapura languages
