= Oceanic Linguistics =

- Discipline: Linguistics
- Language: English
- Edited by: Daniel Kaufman, Yuko Otsuka, Antoinette Schapper

Publication details
- History: 1962–present
- Publisher: University of Hawaii Press (United States)
- Frequency: Biannual

Standard abbreviations
- ISO 4: Ocean. Linguist.

Indexing
- ISSN: 0029-8115 (print); 1527-9421 (web)
- LCCN: 72004445
- JSTOR: 00298115
- OCLC no.: 485743159

Links
- Journal homepage; Online archive at Project MUSE

Oceanic Linguistics is a biannual peer-reviewed academic journal covering research on the indigenous languages of the Oceanic area and parts of Southeast Asia, including the indigenous Australian languages, the Papuan languages of New Guinea, and the languages of the Austronesian (or Malayo-Polynesian) family. Monographs on the same languages are published as Oceanic Linguistics Special Publications.

== History ==
The journal was established in 1962 by George W. Grace (Southern Illinois University, later University of Hawaii). It has been published by the University of Hawaii Press since 1966 (vol. 5). In 1992, the editorship passed to Byron W. Bender (University of Hawaii) and in 2007 it passed to John Lynch (University of the South Pacific). In 2019, he was succeeded by Daniel Kaufman, Yuko Otsuka, and Antoinette Schapper.

The journal's first electronic edition appeared in 2000 on Project MUSE. Back volumes up to three years behind the current volumes of both the journal and the monograph series are available on JSTOR.
