= Kapori language =

Language

Kapori
- Kapauri
- Region: Papua: Pagai village, Kamikaru and Magri hamlets on north bank of upper Idenburg River
- Native speakers: 200 (2006)
- Language family: Foja Range: Kwerbic; Kapauri–Sause; Kapori

Language codes
- ISO 639-3: khp
- Glottolog: kapo1250
- ELP: Kapori
- Kapori language is classified as Critically Endangered by the UNESCO Atlas of the World's Languages in Danger.

Kapori (Kapauri) is a Papuan language of Pagai village in Airu District, Jayapura Regency, Papua, Indonesia.

== Vocabulary ==
The following basic vocabulary words are from Voorhoeve (1975), as cited in the Trans-New Guinea database:

gloss	Kapauri
head	aure
hair	su
eye	hukwani
tooth	wano
leg	tie
louse	usa
dog	unu
bird	irini
egg	hwini
blood	kumu
bone	uw
skin	ufunu
tree	tretaro
man	inaptei
sun	niki
water	bu
fire	sene
stone	liti
name	witini
eat	taro
one	kakua
two	nafrine
