= Byron W. Bender =

American linguist (1929–2020)

- Born: Bryron Wilbur Bender; August 14, 1929; Roaring Spring, Pennsylvania
- Died: January 4, 2020 (aged 90); Honolulu, Hawaii
- Occupation: Linguist

Academic background
- Education: Goshen College (B.A.); Indiana University (M.A., PhD)
- Thesis: A linguistic analysis of the place-names of the Marshall Islands (1963)

Academic work
- Discipline: Micronesian languages

Byron W. Bender (August 14, 1929 – January 4, 2020) was an American linguist and professor at the University of Hawaiʻi who specialized in Micronesian languages, primarily Marshallese, and Oceanic languages more generally. He joined the Department of Linguistics in 1965, serving as its chair (1969–1995) and as editor of its journal Oceanic Linguistics (1991–2007). He also served the University as president of its faculty union (1983–1988) and as a member of the Board of Regents (2003–2020).

Born in Roaring Spring, Pennsylvania, Bender received a B.A. in English from Goshen College in Indiana in 1949, and an M.A. in linguistics from Indiana University in 1950. After spending 1953–1959 teaching in the Marshall Islands in what was then the Trust Territory of the Pacific Islands under U.S. administration, he returned to teach linguistics and anthropology at Goshen College in 1960–1962 before completing a Ph.D. in linguistics from Indiana University in 1963. His dissertation analyzed Marshallese place names. In 1962–1964, he served as English Program Supervisor for the Trust Territory, then taught English at the University of Hawaiʻi before joining the Department of Linguistics.

Bender died on January 4, 2020, at the age of 90.
