= Nimboran language =

Language in Indonesia

Nimboran
- Namblong
- Native to: Indonesia
- Region: New Guinea
- Ethnicity: 3,500 (1987)
- Native speakers: (2,000 cited 1987)
- Language family: Foja Range: Nimboran; Nimboran

Language codes
- ISO 639-3: nir
- Glottolog: nucl1633

Nimboran (Nambrong, Namblong, Namlong) is a Papuan language of Nimboran District, Jayapura Regency, Indonesia spoken by mostly older adults. Younger generations have shifted to Papuan Malay. It is spoken in about 26 villages to the west of Lake Sentani. Only 20% of the Namblong people speak the language.

== Phonology ==
Consonants:
		Labial	Alveolar	Velar
Plosive	voiceless	p	t	k
Plosive	voiced	b	d	ɡ
Plosive	prenasal	ᵐb	ⁿd	ᵑɡ
Nasal		m	n	ŋ
Fricative			s	
Liquid			l	
Semivowel		w	j	

Vowels:
	Front	Central	Back
Close	i	ʉ	u
Mid	e		o
Open	a		
