= Apauwar River =

River in Papua, Indonesia

Apauwar River Appuvar River
- Location within Papua

Location
- Country: Indonesia
- Region: Papua

Physical characteristics
- Source
  - location: Indonesia
- Mouth: Pacific Ocean
  - coordinates: 1°38′15″S 138°11′03″E
- Length: 233.3 km (145.0 mi)
- Basin size: 2,874 km^{2} (1,110 mi^{2})
- Discharge
  - location: Near mouth
  - average: 257.62 m^{3}/s (9,098 cu ft/s)

The Apauwar River is a river in Western New Guinea.

== See also ==
- List of drainage basins of Indonesia
- List of rivers of Western New Guinea
- Apauwar River languages
