= Nawa River =

River in Papua, Indonesia

Nawa River Sungai Nawa
- Location within Papua

Location
- Country: Indonesia
- Region: Papua

Physical characteristics
- Source
  - location: Indonesia
  - coordinates: 2°57′02″S 140°11′06″E
- Mouth
  - coordinates: 3°44′24″S 140°18′46″E

The Nawa River is a river in Western New Guinea. It is the major northern tributary of the Taritatu River, which it forms where it merges with the Sobger River.

== See also ==
- List of drainage basins of Indonesia
- List of rivers of Western New Guinea
- Nawa River languages
