= S. A. Wurm =

Australian linguist

Stephen Wurm AM FASSA FAHA
- Born: Wurm István Adolf; 19 August 1922; Budapest, Hungary
- Died: 24 October 2001 (aged 79)
- Spouse: Helen Groger-Wurm (m. 1946)

Academic work
- Discipline: Linguist
- Institutions: Australian National University
- Main interests: Papuan languages; Turkic languages

Stephen Adolphe Wurm AM FASSA FAHA (Hungarian: Wurm István Adolf, pronounced [ˈvurm ˈiʃtvaːn ˈɒdolf]; 19 August 1922 – 24 October 2001) was a Hungarian-born Australian linguist.

== Early life ==
Wurm was born in Budapest, the second child to the German-speaking Adolphe Wurm and the Hungarian-speaking Anna Novroczky. He was christened Istvan Adolphe Wurm. His father died before Stephen was born.

Both of his parents were multilingual, and Wurm showed an interest in languages from an early age. Attending school in Vienna and travelling to all parts of Europe during his childhood, Wurm spoke roughly nine languages by the time he reached adulthood, a gift he inherited from his father, who spoke 17. Wurm went on to master at least 50 languages.

== Career ==
Wurm grew up stateless, unable to take the nationality of either of his parent or of his country of residence, Austria. That enabled him to avoid military service and attend university. He studied Turkic languages at the Oriental Institute in Vienna, receiving his doctorate in linguistics and social anthropology in 1944 for a dissertation on Uzbek.

In 1946, he married fellow student Helen Groger-Wurm, a specialist in African ethnography. He taught Altaic linguistics at the University of Vienna until 1951.

After reading some works by Sidney Herbert Ray, Wurm became interested in Papuan languages and began a correspondence with Arthur Capell, a lecturer in linguistics at the University of Sydney. Wurm began teaching himself Tok Pisin and Hiri Motu from books and took up a position in London.

In 1954, the Wurms moved to Australia, where Capell had organised for Wurm a post in the Anthropology Department at the University of Sydney. In 1957, the Wurms moved to Canberra, where Stephen took up a post as Senior Fellow within the Research School of Pacific and Asian Studies (RSPAS, now Coral Bell School of Asia Pacific Affairs) at the new Australian National University (ANU). The same year, the Wurms received Australian citizenship. From then on, the main focus of Wurm's research was the study of the languages of New Guinea, but he also carried out research on a number of Australian Aboriginal languages.

At the Australian National University, he was Professor of Linguistics from 1968 to 1987.

== Honours and recognition ==
Wurm was elected fellow of the Academy of Social Sciences in Australia in 1976 and of the Australian Academy of the Humanities in 1977. He was appointed a member of the Order of Australia in the 1987 Queen's Birthday Honours, for "service to education, particularly in the field of linguistics".

== Legacy ==
In tribute to the scholarship of the man, the journal Oceanic Linguistics titled an article on Wurm "Linguist Extraordinaire".

In recognition of Wurm's outstanding contribution, the Stephen Wurm Graduate Prize for Pacific Linguistic Studies was inaugurated in 2008.

== Bibliography ==
- Wurm, Stephen (1975). New Guinea Area Languages and Language Study: Papuan languages and the New Guinea linguistic scene. Dept. of Linguistics, Research School of Pacific Studies, Australian National University. ISBN 9780858831315.
  - Wurm, S.A. editor. New Guinea area languages and language study, Vol. 1, Papuan languages and the New Guinea linguistic scene. C-38. 1975. doi:10.15144/PL-C38
  - Wurm, S.A. editor. New Guinea area languages and language study, Vol. 2, Austronesian languages. C-39. 1976. doi:10.15144/PL-C39
  - Wurm, S.A. editor. New Guinea area languages and language study, Vol. 3, Language, culture, society, and the modern world. C-40. 1977. doi:10.15144/PL-C40
- Wurm, S.A. and Laycock, D.C. editors. Pacific linguistic studies in honour of Arthur Capell. C-13, xii + 1303 pages. Pacific Linguistics, The Australian National University, 1970. doi:10.15144/PL-C13
- Wurm, S.A. "Chapter 6: The Kiwaian Language Family". In Franklin, K. editor, The linguistic situation in the Gulf District and adjacent areas, Papua New Guinea. C-26:217-260. Pacific Linguistics, The Australian National University, 1973. doi:10.15144/PL-C26.217
- Wurm, S.A. editor. Australian linguistic studies. C-54, xvi + 770 pages. Pacific Linguistics, The Australian National University, 1979. doi:10.15144/PL-C54
- Wurm, S.A. Languages: Eastern, Western, and Southern Highlands, Territory of Papua and New Guinea. D-4, + 000 pages. Pacific Linguistics, The Australian National University, 1961.
- Wurm, S.A. editor. Language maps of the highlands Provinces, Papua New Guinea. D-11, iv + 24 pages. Pacific Linguistics, The Australian National University, 1978. doi:10.15144/PL-D11
- Wurm, S.A. editor. Some Endangered Languages of Papua New Guinea: Kaki Ae, Musom, and Aribwatsa. D-89, vi + 183 pages. Pacific Linguistics, The Australian National University, 1997.
- Wurm, Stephen (1972). Languages of Australia and Tasmania. Mouton. ISBN 9789027921840.
- Wurm, Stephen (2001). Atlas of the world's languages in danger of disappearing. UNESCO. ISBN 978-92-3-103798-6.
- Kite, Suzanne; Wurm, Stephen (2004). The Duungidjawu Language of the Southeast Queensland: Grammar, Texts and Vocabulary. Pacific Linguistics, Research School of Pacific and Asian Studies, Australian National University. ISBN 978-0-85883-550-4.
- Wurm, Stephen; Mühlhäusler, Peter; Tryon, Darrell (1996). Atlas of Languages of Intercultural Communication in the Pacific, Asia, and the Americas: Vol I: Maps. Vol II: Texts. Walter de Gruyter. ISBN 978-3-11-081972-4.

== See also ==
- Indo-Pacific languages
- Papuan languages
- Trans–New Guinea languages
- Donald Laycock
- Arthur Capell
- William A. Foley
- Andrew Pawley
- Malcolm Ross (linguist)
- John Lynch (linguist)
- George W. Grace
