= Kwerba languages =

Language family in Papua Province, Indonesia

Kwerba
- Geographic distribution: Papua (Indonesia)
- Linguistic classification: Foja Range: West (Greater Kwerbic); Apauwar–Kwerba (Kwerbic); Kwerba

Language codes
- Glottolog: kwer1262

The half dozen Kwerba languages form a small language family spoken in Papua Province, Indonesia.

== Languages ==
The languages are,

- Bagusa
- Kauwera (Kaowerawedj)
- Kwerba (Sasawa, Air Mati)
- Kwerba Mamberamo (Nopuk)
- Trimuris
