= Sarmi Regency =

Regency in Papua, Indonesia

Sarmi Regency Kabupaten Sarmi
- Regency
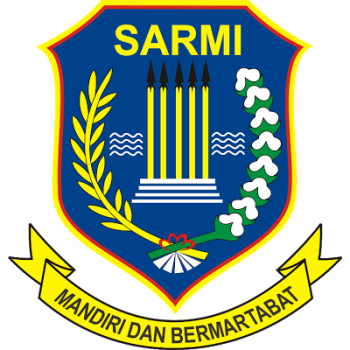
- Coat of arms
- Motto: Mandiri dan Bermartabat (Independent and Dignified)
- Location in Papua Province

- Location in Indonesian Papua Location in Indonesia
- Coordinates: 2.4167°S 139.0833°E
- Country: Indonesia
- Province: Papua
- Capital: Sarmi

Government
  - Regent: Dominggus Catue
  - Vice Regent: Jumriati

Area
  - Total: 18,034.0 km^{2} (6,963.0 sq mi)
- Highest elevation: 2,250 m (7,380 ft)

Population (mid 2024 estimate)
  - Total: 43,090
  - Density: 2.389/km^{2} (6.188/sq mi)
- Time zone: UTC+9 (Indonesia Eastern Time)
- Area code: (+62) 966
- Website: sarmikab.go.id

Sarmi Regency is one of the regencies (kabupaten) in Papua Province of Indonesia. It was formed from the western districts which had until then been part of Jayapura Regency with effect from 12 November 2002. It covers an area of 18,034.0 km^{2} (note that the province-level Statistics Bureau gives an alternate area figure of 14,068.37 km^{2}), and had a population of 32,971 at the 2010 Census and 41,515 at the 2020 Census; the official estimate as of mid-2024 was 43,090 (comprising 22,890 males and 20,200 females). The regency's administrative centre is at the town of Sarmi.

Sarmi is named from an acronym of the five main ethnic groups, which are the Sobei (Sobey), Armati (Kwerba), Rumbuai (Bonggo), Manirem, and Isirawa. These five ethnic groups do not represent the overall diversity in this regency which has 87 ethnic groups, each with their own language.

== Geography ==
Sarmi Regency borders Jayapura Regency to the east and Mamberamo Raya Regency to the west. The southern border of the regency is formed by the Taritatu River; there the regency borders Central Mamberamo Regency in Highland Papua Province. The highest elevation of this regency is the summit of the Gauttier Mountain Range, at ~2,250 m above sea level, near the border with Mamberamo Raya.

== Demographics ==
The majority of Sarmi residents are native Papuans, with significant numbers of transmigrants from Java, Bali, Madura.

=== Religion ===
The majority religion adopted by the Sarmi community is Christianity, with a significant presence of Islam brought by transmigrants from Java and Madura, as well as a small minority of Hindus and Buddhists from Bali.

- Christianity (76.94%)
  - Protestantism (74.74%)
  - Catholicism (2.20%)
- Islam (22.96%)
- Hinduism (0.05%)
- Buddhism (0.05%)

=== Ethnic groups ===
Sarmi is inhabited by Sobey, Armati, Rumbuai, Manirem, and Isirawa - all of who are native Papuans - together with migrants from other parts of Indonesia, especially Javanese, Madurese, Batak, Minangkabau, Bugis, etc.

=== Culture ===
Long before European explorers landed on the northern coast of New Guinea, since prehistoric times the region had been in contact with various foreign cultures. About 3,000 years ago, Austronesian speakers migrated to the northern coast of New Guinea.

They made and used boats adapted for sea voyages, they were the ones who managed to find an outrigger system (balance on the left and right of the boat) to deal with the fierce waves of the ocean.

== Administrative districts ==
At the 2010 Census, Sarmi Regency comprised ten districts (distrik), but subsequently nine additional districts (Sungai Biri, Veen, Bonggo Barat, Ismari, Sobey, Muara Toy, Verkam, Apawer Hilir and Apawer Tengah) have been created by splitting existing districts. These nineteen districts are tabulated below with their areas and their populations at the 2010 Census and the 2020 Census, together with the official estimates as of mid-2023. The table also includes the locations of the district administrative centres, the number of administrative villages in each district (totaling 92 rural kampung and 2 urban kelurahan), and their post codes.

Kode Wilayah	Name of District (distrik)	Area in km^{2}	Pop'n 2010 Census	Pop'n 2020 Census	Pop'n mid 2023 Estimate	Admin centre	No. of villages	Post code
91.10.14	Pantai Timur Barat (Western East Coast)	2,455	3,701	3,077	3,200	Burtin/Asyaf	9	99371
91.10.04	Pantai Timur ^{(a)} (East Coast)	1,794	2,132	2,179	2,200	Betaf III	7	99370
	Sungai Biri	1,422	^{(b)}	695	700	Ansudu	3	99370
	Veen	1,829	^{(b)}	1,919	2,000	Wakde/Ampera	7	99371
91.10.05	Bonggo ^{(c)}	385	3,883	3,115	3,200	Kiren	7	99381
91.10.15	Bonggo Timur (East Bonggo)	863	2,846	3,285	3,400	Mawesmukti	6	99382
	Bonggo Barat (West Bonggo)	308	^{(d)}	1,221	1,300	Podena	9	99382
91.10.02	Tor Atas	1,988	1,713	930	1,000	Samanente	4	99372
	Ismari	1,687	^{(b)}	365	400	Waaf I	4	99372
91.10.01	Sarmi ^{(e)}	419	11,633	13,813	14,100	Sarmi	9 ^{(f)}	99373
91.10.13	Sarmi Timur (East Sarmi)	222	1,555	777	800	Waskey	4	99377
91.10.12	Sarmi Selatan (South Sarmi)	302	1,799	2,178	2,200	Wapoania	3	99376
	Sobey	127	^{(b)}	1,862	1,900	Bagaiserwar II	5	
	Muara Tor	782	^{(b)}	1,079	1,100	Ebram	5	99377
	Verkam	649	^{(b)}	1,062	1,100	Amsira	6	99376
91.10.03	Pantai Barat (West Coast)	810	2,248	1,281	1,300	Arbais	7	99375
91.10.09	Apawer Hulu (Upper Apawer)	779	1,461	1,232	1,300	Aurimi	6	99374
	Apawer Hilir (Lower Apawer)	578	^{(b)}	878	900	Burgena	5	99375
	Apawer Tengah (Central Apawer)	635	^{(b)}	567	600	Airoran	5	99374
	Totals	18,034	32,971	41,515	43,090	Sarmi	94	

Notes: (a) including the offshore islands of Pulau Masimasi, Pulau Wakde Besar, Pulau Wakde Kecil, Pulau Yamna Besar and Pulau Yamna Kecil.
(b) the 2010 population of this new district is included with the figure for the district from which it was subsequently cut out.
(c) including the offshore islands of Pulau Anus, Pulau Yersun, Pulau Podena, Pulau Mengge and Pulau Kaycebo.
(d) the 2010 population of this new district is included with the figure for Bonggo District, from which it was subsequently cut out.
(e) including the offshore islands of Pulau Armo, Pulau Kosong, Pulau Liki and Pulau Sawar. (f) including the 2 kelurahan of Sarmi Kota (Sarmi town) and Mararena.
