= Foja Range languages =

Language family of New Guinea

Foja Range
- (Tor–Kwerba)
- Geographic distribution: New Guinea
- Linguistic classification: Northwest Papuan?: Foja Range
- Subdivisions: Orya–Tor; Greater Kwerba; Nimboran; Mawes †

Language codes
- Glottolog: None

The Foja Range languages, or Tor–Kwerba in more limited scope, are a family of about two dozen Papuan languages. They are named after the Foja Mountains of western New Guinea.

== Languages ==
All the languages had been part of Stephen Wurm's 1975 Trans–New Guinea proposal, but he did not recognize them as a unit, retaining Kwerba within Capell's 1962 Dani–Kwerba proposal, for example. Foley (2018) classifies the Orya–Tor and Kwerbic languages together, as Tor–Kwerba. Usher (2020) adds Nimboran and Mawes, naming the expanded family Foja Range, after the Foja mountain range that passes through all four branches of the family.

- Foja Range
  - Orya–Tor
  - Nimboran
  - Mawes †
  - West Foja Range (Greater Kwerbic)
    - Isirawa
    - Masep
    - Kapauri–Sause
    - Apauwar–Kwerba (Kwerbic)
      - Apauwar Coast
      - Kwerba

== Typological overview ==
Even though grammatical gender is present in Tor-Kwerba languages, there is no overt gender marking on nouns.

== Pronouns ==
Reconstructed proto-Tor-Kwerba independent pronouns are:

Proto-Tor-Kwerba independent pronouns
	sg	pl
1	*ati ~ *ait	*ne(n)
2	*ame	*ame

== Cognates ==
Reconstructed proto-Tor-Kwerba words that are widely distributed throughout the family (Foley 2018):

- *nukwe 'eye'
- *tVn 'leg'
- *nen 'louse'
- *uŋis 'sky'
- *ti ~ *it 'tree'
