= Left May–Kwomtari languages =

Proposed language family of New Guinea

Left May–Kwomtari
- Arai–Kwomtari
- (controversial)
- Geographic distribution: New Guinea
- Linguistic classification: Proposed language family
- Subdivisions: Left May; Kwomtari–Fas

Language codes
- ISO 639-3: –
- Glottolog: None

The Left May–Kwomtari or Arai–Kwomtari languages are a possible small family of Papuan languages proposed by Malcolm Ross, which links the Left May (Arai) family with the Kwomtari–Fas proposal (Loving & Bass 1964). However, the proposal is problematic; it's not clear if the Arai correspondences are with Kwomtari, with Fas, or with both, as Kwomtari–Fas is itself dubious.

== Classification ==
  - Left May or Arai family
  - Fas family: Baibai, Fas
  - ? Kwomtari family:
    - Guriaso language
    - Kwomtari–Nai: Kwomtari, Nai (Biaka)
  - ? Pyu family-level isolate (included in the Kwomtari languages by Laycock (1973), but not addressed by Ross)

Baron (1983) notes that most classifications, including Ross's, perpetuate an early copy error, placing Fas in the Kwomtari family and Nai in the Baibai family. This contradicts the original classification of Loving and Bass, which is supported by their field notes. (See Kwomtari–Baibai languages.) Taking this into account weakens the case for the Left May-Kwomtari proposals. Some relevant pronouns are shown below (Baron 1983):

family	language	I	thou	he	she	they
Kwomtari	Kwomtari	mɔro	ɔno	ɛto		topai
Kwomtari	Nai	nɔmbwirɛ	wonɔ	ɛni		tɔmwɔ
Kwomtari	Guriaso	nan	waw	amo		
Fas	Baibai	ɛtjɛ	aŋɡi	nɛfɛ, wɔ		anjɛ
Fas	Fas	tɛ	haj	wɔ(β)		nəb
Arai	Yinibu	asi, na-	na, nɛni, nan-	ani, w-	wa, tat-	mwa
Pyu		kwa	no	na		

It appears that for proto-Arai and proto-Fas a pronoun *atie might be reconstructed for "I", and a *wa for "s/he", while for Arai and Kwomtari perhaps *na and *amwa might be reconstructed for "you" and "they", with the former perhaps including Pyu as well. No pronouns obviously connect Kwomtari and Fas.
