= Vernon (surname) =

Vernon is a surname, from a masculine name that is derived from the Gallic word vern for alder tree (also "springlike", "flourishing", or "full of life") and a Gaulish-Latin suffix indicating a location. Thus Vernon is a "place of alders". Variants include Vern, Vernard, Verne, Verna, Sberna, and Sberno. Vernon was introduced into England as an aristocratic surname at the time of the Norman Conquest. It was adapted into Spanish as "Vernón".

== Earliest use as a surname ==
The earliest known use of Vernon as a surname dates from 1031 in Normandy, when a Hugh son of Roger de Vernon granted the church of St Peter in Fourques (probably either the present day Saint Paul de Fourques or St Eloi de Fourques) to the Abbey of St Ouen in Rouen.

A few years later Hugh was recorded as one of the men consenting to a grant of land by Duke Robert of Normandy to the abbey of St Wandrille at Serville, ten miles north of Rouen. Although Hugh and his family were to become lords of the town and castle of Vernon later in the eleventh century, Hugh was not its lord at the time of this charter as the Dukes of Normandy held this title personally until 1035. In that year Duke William, Robert's son, then granted the title to his cousin, Guy de Burgundy. The lordship seems to have passed to Hugh de Vernon in 1047 following the failed rebellion of Guy de Burgundy. Hugh survived until the early 1050s when he was succeeded as lord of Vernon by his son William.

For descendants of this family, see:

Vernon family
Vernon baronets
Baron Vernon
Earl of Shipbrook
Edward Vernon (1684–1757), British admiral

== Notable people with this surname ==
- Alexander Vernon (born 1981), American musician
- Annabel Vernon (born 1982), British rower
- Barbara Vernon (activist), Australian maternity activist and government lobbyist
- Barbara Vernon (writer) (1916–1978), Australian playwright and screenwriter
- Belinda Vernon, New Zealand politician
- Bobby Vernon, film actor
- Caroline Vernon, English author
- Charles Vernon, American musician
- Chris Vernon, British military spokesman
- Dai Vernon (1894–1992), Canadian magician
- David Vernon (writer), Australian writer
- Forbes George Vernon, Canadian legislator
- Gavin Vernon, Scottish folk hero active in the removal of the Stone of Scone in 1950
- George Vernon (cricketer), English cricketer
- Howard Vernon, Swiss actor
- Irene Vernon, American actress
- Jim Vernon (footballer) (1942–2014), Scottish footballer
- Jim Vernon (philosopher), Canadian philosopher
- Jackie Vernon (comedian), comedian
- Jackie Vernon (footballer)
- John Vernon (1932–2005), Canadian actor
- Judy Vernon, English athlete
- Jules Vernon, vaudeville performer
- Justin Vernon (born 1981), American musician-songwriter
- Kate Vernon (born 1961), Canadian actress
- Konstanze Vernon, German ballet dancer
- Mabel Vernon, American suffragist
- Mario Vernon Jr (died 2018), Belizean shooting victim
- Max Vernon (born 1988), American performer, songwriter, and playwright
- Melinda Vernon, Australian deaf athlete
- Michael Vernon (1932–1993), Australian consumer activist
- Mickey Vernon (1918–2008), American Major League Baseball player
- Mike Vernon (ice hockey) (born 1963), Canadian retired National Hockey League goaltender
- Mike Vernon (producer) (1944–2026), British record producer
- Nan Vernon, Canadian musician
- Olivier Vernon (born 1990), American football player
- Patrick Vernon (born 1961), British social activist
- Paul Vernon (1949–2024), British blues discographer and writer
- Philip A. Vernon (born 1950), Canadian psychology professor
- Philip E. Vernon (1905–1987), British-born Canadian psychologist and author
- Richard Vernon (disambiguation)
- Robert Vernon (disambiguation)
- Roy Vernon, Welsh footballer
- Scott Vernon, English footballer
- Valerie Vernon, American actress
- Ursula Vernon, American writer
- Walter Liberty Vernon, English-born Australian architect
- William Vernon, Rhode Islander active in the American Revolution
