= Border languages (New Guinea) =

Papuan language family found in Indonesia and Papua New Guinea border area

Border
- Tami River – Bewani Range
- Geographic distribution: New Guinea
- Linguistic classification: Northwest Papuan?: Border
- Subdivisions: Morwap; Senggi; Upper Tami; Bewani Range

Language codes
- Glottolog: bord1247

The Border or Upper Tami languages are an independent family of Papuan languages in Malcolm Ross's version of the Trans–New Guinea proposal.

Unlike the neighboring Sepik languages and many other Papuan language families of northern New Guinea, Border languages do not have grammatical gender or number (dual and plural forms).

== Name ==
The Border family is named after the Indonesia–Papua New Guinea border, which it spans. Other than the Border languages, the Skou, Senagi, Pauwasi, Anim, and Yam families also span the border between Indonesia and Papua New Guinea.

== Classification history ==
Cowan (1957) tentatively proposed a "Tami" family, named after the Tami River, that included the modern Border and Sko language families. Some of the previously unclassified languages turned out to be Sko and were added to that family; the remainder (including the languages of the upper Tami) constitute the Border family.

== Languages ==
Laycock classified Morwap as an isolate but noted pronominal similarities with Border. Ross included Morwap in Border but noted that they do not appear to share any lexical similarities. However, he had quite poor Morwap data. Usher included it as a branch of Border.

=== Foley (2018) ===
Foley (2018) provides the following classification.

Border family

- Taikat: Auyi, Taikat
- Bewani: Ainbai, Kilmeri, Ningera, Pagi
- Waris: Amanab, Auwe (Simog), Daonda, Imonda, Manem, Senggi (Viid), Waina (Sowanda), Waris

=== Usher (2020) ===
The Border languages are:

- Tami River – Bewani Range
  - Upper Tami River
    - Awyi
    - Taikat
  - Bewani Range
    - Manem
    - Poal River
      - Ainbai
      - Pagi
      - Kilmeri (Mbo)
    - Bapi River
      - Southwest
        - Sowanda (Waina)
        - Punda
        - Umeda
      - Amanab
      - Auwe-Daonda
      - Imonda
      - Waris
  - Morwap (Elseng)
  - Senggi (Viid)

Usher does not mention Ningera and subsumes it into another language.

== Pronouns ==
The pronouns that Ross (2005) reconstructs for Proto-Border are the following:

I	*ka	exclusive we	*kia- ?
I	*ka	inclusive we	*bile ?
thou	*je	you	?
s/he	*ihe	they	*ihe- ?

Foley (2018) lists pronouns for the following five Border languages.

Border family pronouns
	Taikat	Kilmeri	Amanab	Waris	Imonda
1incl		nuko	bi	pi	pəl
1excl	ku	ko	ka	ka	ka
2	kebe	de ~ ne	ne	ye	ne
3	yɛ	ki	ehe	hi	ehe

== Cognates ==
Border family cognates (Awyi, Taikat, Kilmeri, Waris, Imonda) listed by Foley (2018):

Border family cognates
gloss	Awyi / Taikat	Kilmeri	Waris / Imonda
‘bone’	sagər	kili	kəl
‘cloud’	tik		tik
‘eat’	na-	ni-	ne-
‘egg’	sur	su	sui
‘eye’	nondof	dob	nof
‘house’	ya	yip	yɛf
‘moon’	usɛ	wɪs	wɛs
‘sun’	kɛwom		ɒkɒmba
‘tongue’	mariel	ber	məde
‘tooth’		lu	lɒ
‘tree’	di	ri	ti
‘water’	obea	pu	po

== Vocabulary comparison ==
The following basic vocabulary words are from Voorhoeve (1971, 1975), as cited in the Trans-New Guinea database.

The words cited constitute translation equivalents whether they are cognate (e.g. mogor, moŋla, moŋgola for “leg”) or not (e.g. nakan, past, bosok for “nose”).

gloss	Awyi	Taikat	Manem	Sowanda	Viid	Waris
head	naŋger; naŋgər	bagər	bagar	mosok	repek	ku
hair	jento; ta	bakta; tar; tat	ta	mog-tse; mog-tše		tea; tɛa
ear	keato	keat	kafŋe	oŋgok	aten	aŋku
eye	najo; nayo	nondor	nof	rugok	now	nop
nose	nubru	nakan	past	bosok	peŋe	lomus
tooth	ka	kaembi	so		nunalk	lelo
tongue	marie		mte	melik	ro	minde
leg	malke	təka	mogor	miŋgak	moŋla	moŋgola
louse	tu			kue	ku	ku
dog	eəl; wŋl	ur		ure; urê	wandr	unde
pig	wot	wot	aŋ; ar	ogtse	sar mejan; sar meyan	mi
bird	noj; noy	nor	joŋ jor; yoŋ; yor	teafu		tuawa
egg	suŋul	sur	suiŋ; suir	suk	tu	suul
blood	keane	jafor; yafor	psoŋko	tap	nine	towol
bone	sakər	sagər	kaŋ; kar	kek	ke	kəi; kəl
skin	fəker	fager; fagɛr	tofŋo; tofro	lopok	kep	towol
breast	mə̃	mɛ	maŋ; mar	tot	mandr	tɛt
tree	ti	di	ti		ti	ti
man	kir	kir	knigiŋ; knigir	owak	du	tənda
woman	kuru	koraha	jaman	uŋwabe	jemena	ŋguabe
sun	mentao	kewom; kɛwom	usam	okomba	pola	okumba
moon	kuŋgəru	usɛ	wes	wules	wos	wɛs
water	wobia; wobio	obea	pu	poa	po	po
fire	tao	dow	saw	sue	tow	sue
stone	ser	sər	suk	xun	kwondr	hon
road, path	məŋgir	meo	monofo	mna	mona	muna
name				unha		nabae
eat	anɛ; na	na	na	nekem; nɛkɛm	na	ne
one	maŋgua	ŋgoa; [ŋgoa]	gueno	moŋgoir	moŋgau	muŋasəl
two	naŋger		sampaŋ	sambaga	tambla	sambla

== Migration history ==
Between 200 and 250 years ago, Bewani-speakers rapidly expanded and migrated towards neighboring regions, which started off chain migrations among various peoples of the region. The migration of Bewani-speakers split up the territory of Kwomtari-speakers, and Fas was displaced to the swampy area of Utai (3.390507°S 141.583997°E). The displaced Fas-speakers then expanded further east into One territory, which caused conflicts between the Fas and One peoples in the Kabore area (3.314106°S 141.840799°E).

The Pagei, Bewani, Bo, and Ningera peoples expanded down the Pual River to displace speakers of Inner Skou and Serra Hills languages. Inner Skou speakers were then forced to migrate and discplaced Barupu/Warapu-speakers (Piore River branch). Bewani-speakers, however, could expand eastward into the lowland swampy areas occupied by speakers of Busa and Yale, who were themselves pushed out of the more fertile hills into the lowland swamps. Westward expansion of Bewani-speakers was halted by fighting in Kaure territory.
