= Kwomtari–Fas languages =

Spurious language family of Papuan languages

Kwomtari–Fas
- Kwomtari; Kwomtari–Baibai
- (spurious)
- Geographic distribution: New Guinea
- Linguistic classification: ? Left May – Kwomtari
- Subdivisions: Kwomtari; Fas (Baibai); Pyu

Language codes
- Glottolog: None

The Kwomtari–Fas languages, often referred to ambiguously as Kwomtari, are an apparently spurious language family proposal of six languages spoken by some 4,000 people in the north of Papua New Guinea, near the border with Indonesia. The term "Kwomtari languages" can also refer to one of the established families that makes up this proposal.

== Classification history ==
=== Loving and Bass (1964) ===
A "Kwomtari" (= Kwomtari–Fas) phylum was first proposed by Loving and Bass (1964). The following classification is based on their proposal, with the addition of the Pyu and language, added by Laycock (1975):

- Kwomtari–Fas phylum
  - Kwomtari–Nas family: Kwomtari, Nai (Biaka)
  - Fas family: Fas, Baibai

=== Laycock (1975) ===
Laycock (1973; 1975) grouped the languages differently, placing Kwomtari and Fas together in the "Kwomtari family", and Baibai and Nai (Biaka) together in a "Baibai family", and calling the overall grouping "Kwomtari–Baibai". Laycock also added the Pyu isolate, though he admitted, "A great deal more work is required on the Kwomtari Phylum before the classification can be regarded as established" (1973:43), and he published no evidence.

- Kwomtari–Baibai phylum (spurious)
  - Kwomtari–Fas family: Kwomtari, Fas
  - Baibai–Biaka family: Baibai, Nai (Biaka)
  - Pyu isolate

=== Baron (1983) ===
However, Baron (1983) notes that Laycock's reclassification appears to have been due to an alignment error in the published comparative data of Loving & Bass. Their raw field notes support their original classification: They found a Swadesh list of Kwomtari to have 45% cognates with Biaka (Nai), while they note that Baibai has only 3% cognates with Biaka, and so cannot be assigned to the same family. Compare (Baron 1983:5 converted to IPA):

Gloss	Fas	Baibai	Kwomtari	Biaka	Guriaso
man	jimɛ(ni̥)	jimɛni	lofwai	doβwai	aməɾim
woman	mo	moŋo	inali	inali	ajti
nose	səʙte	səmɔni	tipu	tɔpokɾi	apədu
eye	kɔj	koɾə	(w)u	wo	mukatu

Baron coined the name "Kwomtari–Fas" to explicitly correct "Kwomtari–Baibai", the name under which Laycock's arrangement was commonly known. Baron added a newly discovered language, Guriaso, as a divergent branch of the Kwomtari family proper, and noted that as of that date Laycock maintained the inclusion of Pyu. However, Baron believes there is little to suggest that the Kwomtari family, Fas family, and Pyu are actually related, except that Kwomtari and Fas use similar kinship terms, which are shared by neighboring families that are not thought to be related to either Kwomtari or Fas.

=== Ross (2005) ===
Malcolm Ross linked Laycock's Kwomtari–Baibai family to the small Left May (Arai) family in a Left May – Kwomtari proposal, which is based on common pronouns. However, the link appears less straightforward once the correction is made for Loving and Bass' data. See Left May – Kwomtari for details.

=== Foley (2018) ===
Foley (2018) provides the following classification.

- Momu (Fas), Baibai
- Guriaso
- Kwomtari, Nai-Biaka
- Pyu

Foley (2018) considers the possibility that each of the four groups may in fact constitute a separate language family of its own. He remains open to the idea that they may be related to each other, though he leaves this question open at the time of publication.

Possible Pyu–Kwomtari pronominal cognates listed by Foley (2018) are:

Possible Pyu–Kwomtari pronoun cognates
Pronoun	Kwomtari	Pyu
‘you (sg)’	une	no
‘we’	mena	məla
‘he/she/it/they’	nane	na

Pronouns in Momu (Fas) and Kwomtari:

Kwomtari and Fas pronouns
	Momu	Kwomtari
1s	te	mene
2s	ai	une
3s	wob	nane
1p	yer	mena
2p	ar	una
3p	nəb	nane

Unlike in many other Papuan languages, nouns in Kwomtari and Fas languages do not have gender, noun classes, or number marking. However, Kwomtari and Fas languages do have case inflection, such as possessive suffixes, some of which are:

- -u (Momu)
- –u ~ -lu (Kwomtari)

== See also ==
- Left May-Kwomtari languages
- Papuan languages
