= David Vernon =

David Vernon may refer to:

- David Vernon (professor) (born 1958), professor at the University of Genoa, Italy
- David Vernon (writer) (born 1965), Australian writer
- David Vernon (poet) (born 1970), British poet
