= Azua =

Azua may refer to:

== Places ==
- Azua Province in the Dominican Republic
- Azua (city), capital of Azua province in the Dominican Republic
  - Battle of Azua, fought 1844 between Dominican and Haitian forces

== Other ==
- Azúa (surname)
- Australian ZX Users' Association (AZUA)
