= D. Vernon =

D. Vernon may refer to:

- Dai Vernon (1894–1992), Canadian magician
- David Vernon (professor) (born 1958), artificial intelligence researcher
- David Vernon (writer) (born 1965), Australian writer
- Di Vernon
