= Biaka =

Biaka may refer to:

- Aka people, also known as BiAka, a nomadic Mbenga pygmy people of central Africa
- Biaka language, a language of Papua New Guinea
- Biaka (butterfly), a genus of butterflies
- Lalbiakhlua Jongte, commonly known as Biaka
