= Sally Tracy =

Australian midwife and activist

Sally Tracy AM is an Australian midwife, midwifery researcher, author and activist. She has authored numerous research articles. In 2023, she was appointed as a Member of the Order of Australia.

== Career ==
In the first two decades of the 2000s, Tracy was at the forefront of midwifery politics in Australia. She has challenged the Australian maternity system through research and practice development in a bid to get a better deal for women in childbirth. She helped set up the Ryde Midwifery Caseload Practice, in Sydney, in 2003. Her research questions the acceptability of the increasing interference of obstetrics with the physiological birth process.

Tracy is the Professor of Midwifery at the University of Sydney and the Royal Hospital for Women, Sydney and a Conjoint Professor, University of New South Wales, Sydney. She is based at the Midwifery and Women's Health Research Unit at the Royal Hospital for Women, Randwick, Sydney. Her research projects include the safety of primary level (especially rural) maternity hospitals and Birth Centres in Australia and the evaluation of midwifery led units. She is currently the chief investigator on a large multicentre randomised controlled trial of caseload midwifery care, funded by a project grant from the National Health and Medical Research Council of Australia. The findings from this research demonstrated that caseload midwifery is cheaper and safer that fragmented care.

She was a joint author of the National Maternity Action Plan.She is the co-author of the main midwifery textbook in Australia, Midwifery - Preparation for Practice which is now in its third edition.

== Honours ==
Tracy was appointed as a Member of the Order of Australia in the 2023 King's Birthday Honours for "significant service to tertiary education, and to midwifery".

== Selected bibliography ==
- Midwifery - Preparation for Practice, 2nd Ed Sally Pairman, Sally Tracy, Carol Thorogood & Jan Pincombe, Elsevier, 2011 ISBN 978-0-7295-3756-8
- Normal Birth - What are My Chances
- Foreword - With Women - an analysis of the differences between shift work and continuity of care, ed David Vernon, Australian College of Midwives, 2007 pXI
- Rates of Obstetric Intervention among Private and Public patients in Australia - a population based study, Christine Roberts, Sally Tracy and Brian Peat, MJ 2000;321:137-141 ( 15 July )
