= Pagi language =

Papuan language

Pagi
- Native to: Papua New Guinea
- Region: Sandaun Province
- Native speakers: 2,100 (2003)
- Language family: Border: Bewani Range; Poal River; Pagi
- Dialects: Bewani (Western); Imbinis (Eastern); Bembi; Eastern Pagi & Western Pagi; Pagei

Language codes
- ISO 639-3: pgi
- Glottolog: pagi1244
- ELP: Pagi

Pagi, or Bembi, is a Papuan language spoken by 2,000 people in five villages in Sandaun Province and in Vanimo District of Papua New Guinea, near the border with Indonesian Papua.

== Overview ==
The name "Bewani" attributes to the mountains that form a boundary between Vanimo and Amanab Districts.

The Imbinis dialect of Pagi is spoken in Imbinis (2.964235°S 141.380826°E) and Imbio (2.906373°S 141.429381°E) villages.

Neighboring languages include Ainbai and Kilmeri, also Border languages belonging to the Bewani branch.

== Usage ==
Pagi is spoken near Bewani Station (3.023119°S 141.167741°E), Idoli (3.025053°S 141.138885°E), and Amoi (3.020995°S 141.176724°E) villages in Bewani-Wutung Onei Rural LLG. Tok Pisin is generally used by the government officials and in families where husband and wife belong to communities speaking different indigenous languages. The region is also influenced by English, which is the main language used in schools of the region, accompanied occasionally by Tok Pisin.
