= Tami River =

River in Papua, Indonesia

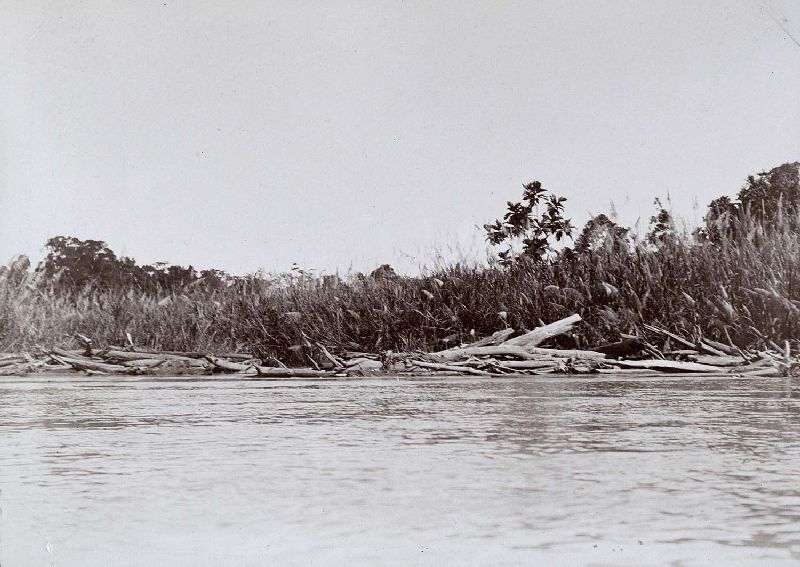

- Location within Papua

Location
- Country: Indonesia
- Region: Papua

Physical characteristics
- Source
  - location: Indonesia
- Mouth
  - coordinates: 2.625°S 140.9172°E

The Tami River is a river in Western New Guinea.

Awyi and Taikat are spoken on the upper part of the Tami River; along the coast, Wutung is spoken to the east and Sko to the west.

== See also ==
- List of drainage basins of Indonesia
- List of rivers of Western New Guinea
- Tami River languages
