= Barbara Vernon =

Barbara Vernon may refer to:

- Barbara Vernon (activist), Australian maternity activist and government lobbyist
- Barbara Vernon (writer) (1916–1978), Australian playwright and screenwriter

== See also ==
- Mary Barbara Bailey (1910–2003), British artist and nun, née Barbara Vernon Bailey
