= Awye language =

Awye could be one of two Papuan languages of Indonesia:

- Awyi language, near the Papua New Guinea border
- Auye language, south of Cenderawasih Bay
