= EUC =

EUC refers to End-user certificate

It may also refer to:

== Education ==
- Erasmus University College, in Rotterdam, Netherlands
- Etisalat University College, former private college in Sharjah, United Arab Emirates
- EUC Nord, a school system in Denmark
- European University Centre, of Nancy 2 University
- European University Cyprus, in Nicosia, Cyprus

== Computing ==
- End-user computing
- Extended Unix Code, a character encoding

== Organizations ==
- Église unie du Canada; the United Church of Canada
- Eravur Urban Council, a local authority in Sri Lanka
- European Union Committee, of the House of Lords in the Parliament of the United Kingdom
- European Universities Championships

== Places ==
- Eucla Airport, in Western Australia

== Other uses ==
- Electrolytes, urea, creatinine, a blood test
- Emergency Unemployment Compensation
- End-user certificate
- Equipment under control in the IEC 61508 standard
- Electric unicycle, see Self-balancing unicycle
- Excellent Used Condition
