= Dera language =

Senagi language spoken in Papua New Guinea

Dera
- Mangguar, Kamberataro
- Native to: Indonesia, Papua New Guinea
- Region: Papua: Keerom Regency, 13 villages
- Ethnicity: Dera
- Native speakers: 1,200 (2006)
- Language family: Senagi: Dera

Language codes
- ISO 639-3: kbv
- Glottolog: dera1245
- ELP: Dera
- Coordinates: 3.611948°S 141.05719°E

Dera (Dra, Dla) a.k.a. Mangguar and Kamberataro (Komberatoro) is a Senagi language of Papua New Guinea and Indonesia. In Papua New Guinea, it is primarily spoken in Kamberataro village (3.611948°S 141.05719°E), Amanab Rural LLG, Sandaun Province.

== Dialects ==
There are two dialects, namely Dla proper and Menggwa Dla.

Dla proper is spoken in the three main villages of Kamberatoro Mission (3°36′S 141°03′E; 1299 feet) in Papua New Guinea, Amgotro Mission (3°38′S 140°58′E; 1969 feet) and Komando village in Papua Province, Indonesia. Komando village was formerly a Dutch border post. Other Dla proper speaking villages in Papua New Guinea are Tamarbek (3.591701°S 141.055114°E), Akamari (3.597044°S 141.059233°E), New Kamberatoro; Old Kamberatoro, ‘Border Village’, Nimberatoro (3.625973°S 141.042369°E), Nindebai (3.64111°S 141.006033°E), Mamamora (3.653793°S 141.020182°E), Yamamainda (3.669519°S 141.033445°E), Orkwanda (3.647337°S 141.081231°E), and Lihen (3.623834°S 141.117364°E). While Papua Province in Indonesia has the Dla villages of Amgotro, Komando, Indangan, Mongwefi, Buku, and Agrinda, which are mostly located in Yaffi District, Keerom Regency.

Menggwa Dla, the less populous of the two dialects, is spoken in five villages located between Kamberatoro Mission and Komando village, which are Menggau, Wahai (3.580863°S 141.029277°E), Ambofahwa (alternatively known as Wahai Nº 2), Wanggurinda (3.580396°S 141.028671°E; 3°34′59″S, 141°01′41″E) in Papua New Guinea, and Menggwal (3°33′53″S, 140°59′04″E) in Papua Province, Indonesia.

== Status ==
Dla (Dera) speakers are shifting to Tok Pisin and Papuan Malay. De Sousa (2006) reports that the younger generation born in the 1990s or later usually cannot speak Dera fluently, whereas the older generation remains fluent.

== Phonology ==
Dera has 14 consonants (4 less than Angor), which are:

		Labial	Alveolar	Palatal	Velar	Glottal
Nasal		m	n			
Plosive	voiceless	p	t		k	
Plosive	voiced	b	d		ɡ	
Fricative		ɸ	s		x	
Liquid			r			
Semivowel		w		j		

Dera has 5 vowels (2 less than Angor), which are:

	Front	Back
Close	i	u
Mid	e	o
Open	a	

== Vocabulary comparison ==
The following basic vocabulary words of Dera dialects are from Voorhoeve (1971, 1975), as cited in the Trans-New Guinea database:

gloss	Dera (Amgotro dialect)	Dera (Moŋgowar dialect)	Dera (Amgotro dialect)
head	boda	bapale	boda
hair	nanada	nenale	nanada
ear	kumbo- keda	gombo-gala	kumbo- keda
eye	kumba- kwada	kamba-gala	kumba- kwada
nose	gutubu	damor	gutubu
tooth	jabo-gemda	djabo	jabo-gemda
tongue	tabu	tep	tabu
louse	manə	mave	manə
dog	jabodo		jabodo
pig	wadə		wadə
bird	du	tu	du
egg	dogomda	tugabola	dogomda
blood	kodoa	hola	kodoa
bone	gemda	saba	gemda
skin	kueda	kiaba	kueda
breast	toto	tutu	toto
tree	namo; nomo	agala	namo; nomo
man	jani- ndia	jani	jani- ndia
woman	kuadedebo	kolbake	kuadedebo
sun	kəbu	gəfu	kəbu
moon	amana	anam	amana
water	kue	gəwei	kue
fire	kai	kai	kai
stone	nəmai	nimi	nəmai
road, path	bakoda		bakoda
name		dia	
eat	tato-	hede-	tato-
one	mano; ŋguadu	mamu	mano; ŋguadu
two	imbu	jimbal	imbu
