= Guriaso language =

Senu River language of Papua New Guinea

Guriaso
- Region: Papua New Guinea
- Native speakers: 1,500 (2014)
- Language family: Senu River: Guriaso–Yale; Guriaso

Language codes
- ISO 639-3: grx
- Glottolog: guri1248
- ELP: Guriaso
- Coordinates: 3.581107°S 141.592197°E

Guriaso or Muno is a language of Papua New Guinea. Only described in 1983, it appears to be distantly related to the Kwomtari and Nai languages. (See Senu River languages for details.) It is spoken in Guriaso ward (3.581107°S 141.592197°E), Amanab Rural LLG, Sandaun Province.

== Sources ==
- Baron, Wietze (1983). "Kwomtari survey" (PDF).
