= KBV =

KBV or kbv may refer to:

- Dera language, Papua New Guinea and Indonesia, by ISO 639-3 code
- Krabi International Airport, Nuea Khlong, Krabi, Thailand, by IATA code
- Kashmir bee virus
