= Having a Great Birth in Australia =

Book by David Vernon

- Author: David Vernon
- Cover artist: Tessa Read and Kevin Thom
- Language: English
- Genre: Nonfiction
- Publisher: Australian College of Midwives
- Publication date: 2005
- Publication place: Australia
- Media type: Print
- Pages: 200
- ISBN: 0-9751674-3-X
- OCLC: 156409603
- Preceded by: Skeptical - A handbook of pseudoscience and the paranormal
- Followed by: Men at Birth

Having a Great Birth in Australia is the second book from Australian writer David Vernon.

The book is an edited anthology of birth experiences, that demonstrate that birth can be a positive, life-affirming event, and that it need not, with the right support, be the trauma that the media often suggests childbirth is. The experiences described are diverse, ranging from caesarean births and VBAC births, to births that take place at home and in a birth centre or labour ward. All of the mothers in this book chose to have their birth care provided by an individual midwife. These stories express the experiential aspects of childbirth and are used to educate midwives. There is also a description of a miscarriage and a stillbirth and the stories explain how the women managed to overcome their feelings of grief at the event.

This book set the style and content for Vernon's subsequent book, Men at Birth which describes men's experience of birth.
