= NBY =

NBY, or nby, may refer to:

- nby, the ISO 639-3 code for the Ningera language spoken in Sandaun Province, Papua New Guinea
- NBY, the National Rail code for Newbury railway station in the county of Berkshire, UK
- NBY, the NYSE American stock exchange code for NovaBay Pharmaceuticals, a US biopharmaceutical company
