= Simon Brown (author) =

Australian Science Fiction writer

- Born: 1956; Sydney, Australia

Simon Brown (born 1956 in Sydney) is an Australian science fiction writer.

He originally trained as a journalist and worked for a range of Australian Government Departments, including the Australian Electoral Commission and the NSW Railways Department. He wrote science fiction short stories for many years and some of these have been collected in Cannibals in the Fine Light (1998). A second collection of Iliad-themed stories, Troy, was published in 2006. He is a member of the Australian Skeptics and edited Skeptical – A handbook of pseudoscience and the paranormal in 1989. He was also an editor of Argos, the journal of the Canberra Skeptics.

He won the 2009 short story division of the Aurealis Award for his story "The Empire"

== Publications ==
=== Novels ===
- Privateer, HarperCollins Australia 1996
- Winter, HarperCollins Australia 1997
- Inheritance: Book 1 of the Keys of Power, HarperCollins Australia, 2000
- Fire and Sword: Book 2 of the Keys of Power, HarperCollins Australia, 2001
- Sovereign: Book 3 of the Keys of Power, HarperCollins Australia, 2002
- Empire's Daughter: Book 1 of the Chronicles of Kydan, Pan MacMillan Australia, 2004
- Rival's Son: Book 2 of the Chronicles of Kydan, Pan MacMillan Australia, 2004
- Daughter of Independence: Book 3 of the Chronicles of Kydan, Pan MacMillan Australia, 2005

=== Collections ===
- Cannibals of the Fine Light, Ticonderoga Publications, April 1998
- Troy, Ticonderoga Publications, 2006

=== Selected short fiction ===
- "With Clouds at Our Feet" (1998) in Dreaming Down-Under (ed. Jack Dann, Janeen Webb)
- "Water Babies (novelette)|Water Babies" (2004) in Agog! Smashing Stories (ed. Cat Sparks)
- "Leviathan (short story)|Leviathan" (2006) in Fantasy: The Very Best of 2005 (ed. Jonathan Strahan)

=== Other works ===
- Skeptical – A Handbook of pseudoscience and the paranormal, Ed Donald Laycock, David Vernon, Colin Groves, Simon Brown, Imagecraft, Canberra, 1989.

== Awards ==
- "Atrax" (with Sean Williams) Aurealis Award for Horror Short Fiction, 1999
- "Love is a Stone", Aurealis Award for Horror Short Fiction, 2003
- "The Empire" Aurealis Award for Science Fiction Short Fiction, 2008
