= Men at Birth =

2006 book edited by David Vernon

- Author: David Vernon
- Cover artist: Tessa Read
- Language: English
- Genre: Nonfiction
- Publisher: Australian College of Midwives
- Publication date: 2006
- Publication place: Australia
- Media type: Print
- Pages: 226
- ISBN: 0-9751674-4-8
- OCLC: 85761229
- Preceded by: Having a Great Birth in Australia
- Followed by: With Women

Men at Birth is a book from Australian writer David Vernon.

The book is an edited anthology of birth experiences, written by men. The experiences described are diverse, ranging from caesarean births and VBAC births, to births that take place at home and in a birth centre or labour ward.

The book has caused some controversy with its view that men who are poorly prepared for birth should not attend the birth of their child, as it may make the birth more difficult for the woman.

On 13 December 2007, Men at Birth was the winner of the ACT Writing and Publishing Awards for Best Nonfiction Book of the Year. The award was made by Jon Stanhope.
