= Michael Vernon (disambiguation) =

Michael Vernon (1932–1993) was an Australian consumer activist.

Michael or Mike or Mickey Vernon may also refer to:

- Mike Vernon (ice hockey) (born 1963), Canadian former NHL goaltender
- Mike Vernon (producer) (1944–2026), British record producer
- Mickey Vernon (1918–2008), American baseball player
