= Walsa Rural LLG =

Local-level government in Papua New Guinea

- Location within Papua New Guinea
- Coordinates: 3.32897°S 141.162016°E
- Country: Papua New Guinea
- Province: Sandaun Province
- Time zone: UTC+10 (AEST)

Walsa Rural LLG is a local-level government (LLG) of Sandaun Province, Papua New Guinea. Waris languages are spoken in this LLG.

== Wards ==
- 01. Doandai (Auwe-Daonda language speakers)
- 02. Smock (Auwe-Daonda language speakers)
- 03. Namola
- 04. Daunchendi
- 05. Epmi
- 06. Doponendi (Waris language speakers)
- 07. Wainda
- 08. Holosa
- 09. Daundi
- 10. Tamina 1
- 11. Fas 1 (Fas language speakers)
- 12. Waina (Sowanda language speakers: Waina dialect/village)
- 13. Punda (Sowanda language speakers: Punda and Umeda dialects/villages)
