= Sberna =

Sberna is an Italian surname. It was originally introduced to Sicily and southern Italy by the Normans between the 11th and 12th centuries. According to Gerhard Rohlfs, it derives from a Sicilian word of Celtic origin, sberna ("alder"), whereas for Giuseppe Gioeni it means "big cloth cover" (cf. burnous). Related surnames are Vernon, Osborne (in the English-speaking world) and Bernaz (in the Chablais).

People with the surname Sberna include:

- Antonella Sberna (born 1982), Italian politician
