= Umeda (disambiguation) =

Umeda may refer to

- Umeda, district in Kita-ku, Osaka, Japan
- Umeda language
- Umeda Station, railway station in Kita-ku, Osaka, Japan

== Surnames ==
- Ayaka Umeda, Japanese idol singer (AKB48)
- Erika Umeda, Japanese idol singer (Cute)
- Kota Umeda
- Masahiko Umeda, Japanese wrestler
- Mochio Umeda, Japanese management consultant
- Naoya Umeda, Japanese football player
- Ryuuji Umeda, Japanese billiards player
- Takashi Umeda, Japanese football player
