= Kilmeri language =

Papuan language of Papua New Guinea

Kilmeri
- Native to: Papua New Guinea
- Region: Sandaun Province
- Ethnicity: 2,800 (2004)
- Native speakers: 2,000 (2004)
- Language family: Border: Bewani Range; Poal River; Kilmeri

Language codes
- ISO 639-3: kih
- Glottolog: kilm1241
- ELP: Kilmeri
- Coordinates: 2.916313°S 141.298028°E

Kilmeri, or bo apulyo is a Papuan language of Papua New Guinea near the border with Indonesian Papua. It is not being learned by children.

Kilmeri is spoken around Ossima ward (2.916313°S 141.298028°E) in Bewani/Wutung Onei Rural LLG, Sandaun Province.

Speakers of Kilmeri refer to their own language as bo apulyo, meaning sound in the middle.

== Dialects ==
Dialects are:

- Western Kilmeri dialect (spoken in western villages)
  - Elau
  - Osol
  - Kilipau
  - Kiliwes
  - Isi
  - I
  - Isi II
  - Sosi
  - Ilup
- Eastern Kilmeri dialect (spoken in eastern villages and hamlets)
  - Ossima
  - Isi Daru
  - Akos
  - Awol
  - Airu
  - Asue
  - Omoi
  - Omula

The two major dialect groupings have an estimated cognate percentage of 82% based on lexicostatistics.

== Phonology ==
Kilmeri distinguishes 18 consonants, 12 of which are phonemic.

Consonants
		Bilabial	Labiodental	Alveolar	Palatal	Velar	Glottal
Plosive	voiced prenasalised	b		d		⌈g⌉	
Plosive	Voiceless	p				k	⌈ʔ⌉
Plosive	Labialized	(pʷ̜)					
Nasal		m		n			
Rhotic		ᵐʙ		r			
Fricative		(β / ɸ)	⌈f⌉	s			
Lateral				l			
Approximant			ʋ		j		

The sounds in parentheses are possible allophones of the bilabial trill. [β] can be intervocalical, [ɸ] can be the final sound, and [pʷ̜] can be syllable-initial. The sounds in half brackets occur extremely rarely and can likely be attributed to loan words.

The exceedingly rare bilabial trill /ʙ/ is found in the areal-related Kwomtari and Sko languages, but not in other Border languages. It likely developed from a prenasalized bilabial stop followed by a high back rounded vowel, hence why [mbu] occurs only in ten words.

Kilmeri has eight vowels, all of which are always short.

Vowels
	(Near) Front	Central	(Near) Back
High	i		u
Near-high	ɪ		ʊ
Mid	ɛ		ɔ
(Near) -low	æ	a	

The near-high and near-low vowels are especially rare. Thus, Kilmeri was believed to have seven vowels until a small selection of words, such as /bi/ (pig) and /bɪ/ (hole) show a clear distinction between /i/ and /ɪ/.

The main syllable structure is CV with two preferred syllables.

== Orthography ==
The phonetic inventory easily translates into Latin letters. The near-low vowel uses ae and the near-high vowels use diacritics. Literate Kilmeri speakers much preferred the symbol p for the bilabial trill, but pp was selected to indicate two different phonemes.

Phoneme	Grapheme
/b/	b
/d/	d
/k/	k
/l/	l
/m/	m
/n/	n
/p/	p
/ʙ/	pp
/r/	r
/s/	s
/ʋ/	w
/j/	y
/a/	a
/æ/	ae
/ɛ/	e
/i/	i
/ɪ/	î
/ɔ/	o
/u/	u
/ʊ/	û

== Pronouns ==
Kilmeri has eleven personal pronouns without gender distinction.

Personal pronouns
	Singular	Dual	Plural
1st INCL	ko	dedukoyo	nuko
1st EXCL	ko	koyo	uke
2nd	de	deyo	ine
3rd	ki ~ ke	kiyo	iki

The dual forms end with the locative suffix -yo and is derived from the singular. The inclusive dual is often substituted with the inclusive plural, especially in narrative stories.

== Verbs ==
Kilmeri verb forms can express complex modality. Examples:

de-le	prob-go	‘will probably go’
lam < le-m	go-pot	‘might go’
lou < le-ou	go-frust	‘go in vain’
lap < le-p	go-imp	‘go!’
klam < k-le-m	neg.imp-go-neg.imp	‘don’t go!’
loipap < le-ipe-p	go-first-imp	‘go first, and then…’

Circumfixes can also be applied to verbs in Kilmeri.

Number agreement in Kilmeri is absolutive rather than accusative.

In Kilmeri, intransitive verbs, as well as the two transitive verbs ‘eat’ and ‘throw down to’, agree with subjects in number. This pattern is also present in Amanab. These verbs are:

gloss	singular	plural
‘eat’	ni	ile
‘throw down to’	pakʊne	pakʊpi
‘come’	pule	pulupi
‘die’	sui	supuli
‘go’	le	mole
‘sit’	nake	mape
‘sleep’	nui	sapi
‘speak’	mui	molive

However, number marking for transitive verbs, except for ‘eat’ and ‘throw down to’, refers to the number of the object, rather than the subject.

gloss	singular	plural
‘carry’	wili	moli
‘carry hanging’	lali	laluli
‘cook’	si	sepi
‘cut’	suke	sukeli
‘dig’	rari	rararpi
‘erect’	newe	newaupi
‘fetch someone’	lakive	leki
‘fill’	norive	nororpi
‘harvest’	lapiye	lapapi
‘mark’	lopi	lopapi
‘sharpen’	merive	mererpi
‘take out’	pulive	puloli
‘tear’	pike	pikeki
