= Bembi language =

Bembi may refer to:

- Belait language
- Pagi language
