= Baibai language =

Fas language of Papua New Guinea

Baibai
- Region: Sandaun Province, Papua New Guinea
- Native speakers: (340 cited 2000 census)
- Language family: Fas: Baibai

Language codes
- ISO 639-3: bbf
- Glottolog: baib1251
- ELP: Baibai

Baibai is one of two Fas languages of Amanab District, Sandaun Province, Papua New Guinea. It is the eponymous language of the spurious Baibai family, which was posited when the Fas language was mistakenly swapped for the Kwomtari language Biaka in published data. It actually has little in common with Kwomtari, but is 40% cognate with Fas. (See Fas languages for details.)

== Locations ==
Baron (2007) lists Baibai-speaking villages as Itomi, Piemi, Baibai, and Yebdibi.

== Sources ==
- Baron, Wietze (1983). Kwomtari survey (Report). Draft. SIL International. Archived from the original on 19 July 2020.
