= Amanab language =

Language spoken in Papua New Guinea

Amanab
- Region: Amanab District, Sandaun Province, Papua New Guinea
- Native speakers: 4,400 (2003)
- Language family: Border: Bewani Range; Bapi River; Amanab
- Writing system: Latin

Language codes
- ISO 639-3: amn
- Glottolog: aman1265
- ELP: Amanab
- Coordinates: 3.583417°S 141.214903°E)

Amanab is a Papuan language spoken by 4,400 people in Amanab District (3.583417°S 141.214903°E), Sandaun Province, Papua New Guinea.

Dialects are Eastern, Northern, and Western.

== Phonology ==
=== Vowels ===
	Front	Back
High	i	u
Mid	ɛ	ɔ
Low	ɑ	

=== Consonants ===
		Labial	Coronal	Dorsal
Nasal		m	n	
Plosive	prenasalized	ᵐb	ⁿd	ᵑɡ
Plosive	voiceless	p	t	k
Fricative	voiceless	ɸ	s	h
Fricative	voiced			ɣ
Approximant/Flap		w	l~ɾ	j

== Pronouns ==
The Amanab pronouns are:

		singular	dual	plural
1st person	exclusive	ka	ka-ningri	ka-ger
1st person	inclusive		bi-ningri	bi-ger
2nd person		ne	ne-ningri	ne-nger
3rd person		ehe	ehe-ningri	ehe-nger

== Syntax ==
In Amanab, subordinate clauses are linked using the topic marker suffix -ba.
