= Fas languages =

Language family

Fas
- Baibai–Momu
- Geographic distribution: Papua New Guinea
- Linguistic classification: Kwomtari–Fas? Northwest Papuan?: Fas
- Subdivisions: Fas (Momu); Baibai

Language codes
- Glottolog: baib1250
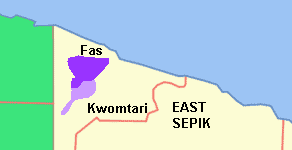
- The neighboring Fas and Kwomtari language families

The Fas languages are a small language family of Papua New Guinea.

== Classification ==
Despite the fact that the family consists of just two closely related languages, Baibai and Fas (40% cognate), there has been considerable confusion over its membership, apparently due to a misalignment in the publication (Loving & Bass 1964) of the data used for the initial classification. (See Baron 1983.) The initial name of the family was Fas, but Laycock (1975) changed it to Baibai when he mistakenly moved the Fas language to the Kwomtari family, an error perpetuated in much of the literature. Baibai (Baibai and Biaka) is therefore not a synonym for the Fas family (Baibai and Fas). See Kwomtari–Fas languages for details.

A few regular sound correspondences are apparent (Baron 1983:21 ff):

correspondence	Fas example	Baibai example	Gloss
*mb → ʙ, mb	mɛʙəkɛ	mɛmbəkɛ	"star"
*nd → k, ɾ	kəmas	ɾəmas	"bow"
k–f metathesis*	kafəki	ɾaɾəfi	"tobacco"
*k → zero, *k	kɛj	ɾɛɡi	"hand" (< *ɾɛki)

The odd change from *nd to /k/ (via *hr) has also occurred in the Bewani languages and some of the Vanimo languages.

*/k/–/f/ metathesis still operates in Fas. /s/–/f/ and /s/–/m/ metathesis has been reconstructed.

*/k/ is lost in some environments. Baibai [ɾɛɡi] may be phonemically /ɾɛki/.

Baron sees no evidence that the similarities between the Fas and Kwomtari families are any greater than with neighboring unrelated families, and thus doubts the validity of the putative Kwomtari–Fas family.

== Phonological features ==
Two papers were published by Wietze Baron (1979, 1983a) on the phonology of Fas. Baron argued that the phonological processes of Fas contradict claims by proponents of Natural Generative Phonology that Paul Kiparsky's Opacity Principle allowed no exceptions. See Optimality theory for later developments in phonological theory. Further papers are posted on his website. Recently an honours thesis by Fiona Blake (University of Sydney) has also been posted on the web; she refers to Fas as Momu.

The Fas language apparently has a seven-vowel system. It also has a bilabial trill [ʙ] (Baron 1979:95), even though Laycock (1975:854) had expressed his doubts about earlier reports of this feature by Capell (1962).

== Proto-language ==
Some lexical reconstructions of Proto-Baibai-Momu (i.e., Proto-Fas) by Usher (2020) are:

gloss	Proto-Baibai-Momu
older brother	*apɛ
name	*ambu
smoke	*mVsV
star	*mɛmbVkɛ
mother (addressing)	*mɛ
flying fox	*mɛnɛ
net bag	*man
shoulder	*mandVɸV
woman	*mɔŋgɔ
water/river	*ɸi
salt	*ɸVn[ɛ]
breast/milk	*ɸVki
house	*ɸVndV
axe	*tɔmakɔ
liver	*tVtV
hand	*ndɛŋgi
know	*ndam...
tobacco	*ndandVɸi
fire	*ndɔa
bow	*ndVmas
many	*ndɔambɔ
fat/grease	*sVmbu
black	*sVŋgarɔ
bird-of-paradise sp.	*sujakɛ
eye	*kVri
axe	*ŋgambɛ
areca nut	*ŋgVmVsV
earth/ground	*ŋgVndV
egg	*handɔ
2 sg.	*[h]aŋgi
skin	*hVraɔ
moon	*wVsi
3 sg.	*wɔ
stone	*wɔneŋgrɛ
