= Imonda language =

Papuan language of Papua New Guinea

Imonda
- Native to: Papua New Guinea
- Region: Sandaun Province
- Native speakers: (250 cited 1994)
- Language family: Border: Bewani Range; Bapi River; Imonda

Language codes
- ISO 639-3: imn
- Glottolog: imon1245
- ELP: Imonda

Imonda is a Papuan language of Sandaun Province, Papua New Guinea. It has a simple consonant system and a complex vowel system with no phonological tones. Imonda is heavily verb-oriented and does not mark nouns for number or gender but marks number on the verb for subject, object, and several other types of noun phrases. Tense, aspect, negation, and interrogation are also indicated in part on the verb. There is a very high-frequency topic clitic, which can be used on noun phrases, adverbs, or verbs. The language has no coordinating or subordinating conjunctions and fills those roles with other approaches.

== Phonology ==
In angle brackets is the romanization Walter Seiler used in his 1985 grammar of the language, which is the most prevalent scheme. Where no romanization is given, the romanization is the same as the IPA.

=== Consonants ===
Imonda consonant phonemes
	Labial	Alveolar	Velar
Stop	p, b	t, d	k, ɡ
Fricative	ɸ <f>	s	x <h>
Nasal	m	n	
Liquid		l, (r)	

/ɸ/ and /x/ are allophonically voiced intervocalically.

=== Vowels ===
Imonda has 10 vowels, which is the most for any Border language and also much more than most other Papuan languages.

Imonda vowel phonemes
	Front	Central	Back
High	i		u
High-Mid	e		o
Low-Mid	ɛ <è>	ə <ë>	ɔ <ò>
Low	æ <ã>	a	ɒ <õ>

== History ==
In the late 19th century, Imonda speakers had limited contact with Malay traders, who were referred to as sue-na-id (men of fire). Though in some areas of New Guinea, the locals became fluent in Malay at the time, there appears to have been no such influence on Imonda-speakers.

The next interaction with outsiders occurred during World War II. Japanese soldiers fleeing Americans at the coast stayed at Imonda for a few days. There was a fight and two Imonda speakers were killed, some houses were burnt down, and villagers were raped.

Later, there was some contact with the Dutch, who hired locals as carriers or for work in towns. At this time many Imonda speakers did learn Malay (notably not recognizing that they had had any previous contact with it) and were exposed to Western culture.

Until 1962, the language Imonda was spoken almost exclusively in a single village now called "Imonda on the rocks". At that date, the Australians assumed control from Dutch New Guinea, and the Imonda split into two groups and established two villages in more accessible locations: Mol (daughter) and Põs (grass).

Wordlists had been compiled for all Waris languages including Imonda prior to 1973. The grammar of the language was studied in detail by Walter Seiler in a Ph.D. dissertation (1984) and subsequent book (1985).

Unlike many neighboring areas, Malay was never systematically taught to Imonda-speakers though some loanwords from Malay are in use. At the time of Seiler's 1985 grammar of the language, when conversation with the neighboring Waris occurs, it is often carried out in Tok Pisin in which all Imonda-speakers are fluent and from which Imonda takes many loanwords.

== Numerals ==
Imonda's numerals are based on compounding. For example, three is denoted sabla mugõ (lit. two one) and five, sabla sabla mugõ (two two one).

== Noun classifiers ==
Imonda classifies nouns using verbal prefixes, which evolved from serial verbs. The serial verbs typically had to do with handling and preparing objects, and the noun classifiers are required only before a small set of common verbs, with meanings like 'give', 'put', 'throw', 'hold', and 'carry'.

There are around 100 different noun classes, but some nouns belong to multiple classes; for example, as they are prepared, coconuts have to be picked, husked, and split. If a coconut has been picked but not husked, it will take the classifier põt, which is identical to the verb for picking. Similar classifiers specify each state of preparation. Though they are historically derived from serial verb usage with meanings like 'pick that and hand it to me', they have entirely lost that meaning, and Imonda-speakers are not always aware of the similarity.

Some of Imonda's classifiers
form	members	likely source	source verb meaning
l-	edible greens, books	les	pile up
pui-	biscuits, coconuts, items normally split	puiual	split (something) in two
u-	Small animals; fish, frogs	unknown	unknown
i-	water	i	scoop water out of dammed fish trap
bas-	netbags	unknown	unknown
lëg-	clothing, flat things	lëg	give birth
nëh-	things that can be tied	nëhe	tie up
tit-	betelnuts	tit	pick betelnuts

There are two classifiers, fa- and g-, that can occur with a large set of nouns not following any apparent pattern and even replace other classifiers in situations in which they normally are used. Loanwords also fall into these classes. There is some evidence that fa-, the most common classifier in the language, did not derive from a verb at all but instead was reanalyzed from an initial f on several common verb stems, the same verbs that require classifiers.

Verbs that always require classifiers
ai	'give'
eha	'put'
pi	'get'
(f)ia	'get'
keda	'hang up'
hõdõ	'put up'
nugahõ	'fill in'
shi	'stick into'
api	'throw'
ula	'hold, possess'
uluh	'hold'
ue	'put into fire'

Transitive verbs agree with their objects in number by using the suffix -uɒl:

ehe-m iɛf nibia-uɒl fe-na-f
3-DAT house build-PL.OBJ do-BEN-PRS
‘(I) build a house for him.’

Motion verbs such as uagl "go" can take classifiers and change meaning to something like "carry" when they do so. Unlike with other verbs, -i- separates the classifier from the motion verb. That allows the use of an actual serial verb construction to be distinguished from use of a classifier (the -i- will be missing).

Several verbs may or may not use classifiers with no change in meaning: ne "eat", pada "hold", and li "lie".

Imonda also classifies nouns into three large sets using several copula-like verbs, which may be used wonly ith certain nouns. Roughly speaking, the classes correspond to tall or vertical things, flat or horizontal things, and a third class which is neither. These copulae evolved out of the verbs lõh "stand", ale "sit" and li "lie". There is also a copula ialuõ, which can be used with any noun.

== Number ==
Imonda has a dual and a plural number.

In contrast to most other languages, the Imonda language features a non-plural marker:

	singular	plural
Imona	toad-ianèi	toad
English	boy	boy-s

Verbs can agree in number with their subject, object, recipient, benefactive, possessor, and/or accompanier, and there are different strategies for each one. For example, dual in either subject or object is usually marked by ‘’-ual’’ on the verb; a human subject may instead be marked by ‘’e-‘’ on the verb, or both may co-occur. Plural subjects are usually marked by raising the last vowel of the verb stem, but some verbs have suffixes that are used, or they completely change form in the plural. A single verb ‘ai’ ‘give’, marks for singular recipient obligatorily with the suffix ‘’-h’’. The suffix ‘’-na’’ obligatorily marks singular beneficiaries, and the same suffix optionally marks a singular human possessor.

In Imonda, transitive verbs agree with subjects in number by vowel raising or suppletion.

gloss	singular	plural
‘do’	fe	fi
‘eat’	ne	hla
‘go’	uagl	aiuagl
‘go up’	puhɒ	aipuhɒ
‘pound sago’	sne-ula	sne-ula-fia
‘search’	soh	suh
‘see’	nagla	naglɛ
‘speak’	ɒ	ɔ
‘stand’	lɒh	ləfah
‘tear’	se	si
‘weave netbag’	hɒnɒ	pueg

== Sources ==
- Seiler, Walter (1985). Imonda, A Papuan Language. Pacific Linguistics Series B - No. 93. Canberra: Pacific Linguistics. doi:10.15144/pl-b93. hdl:1885/145396. ISBN 978-0-85883-326-5.
