= Jenny Gamble =

Australian midwife

Jenny Gamble is an Australian midwife who is Professor Emeritus of Midwifery at Griffith University and Director of Transforming Maternity Care Collaborative.

She has been President of the Queensland Branch of the Australian College of Midwives and National President of the Australian College of Midwives from 2009-2010.. She is an expert in models of maternity care for optimum health outcomes.

As well as representing midwifery in Queensland, she is an expert on traumatic birth and counselling methods to overcome the trauma of a poor birth.
