= Senu River =

River in Papua New Guinea

- Location within Papua New Guinea

Location
- Country: Papua New Guinea
- Region: Sandaun Province

Physical characteristics
- Source
  - location: Papua New Guinea
- Mouth
  - coordinates: 3°36′54″S 141°30′20″E

The Senu River is a river in Sandaun Province, Papua New Guinea.

== See also ==
- List of rivers of Papua New Guinea
- Senu River languages
