= Donald Laycock =

Australian linguist and anthropologist

- Born: 1936; Australia
- Died: 27 December 1988 (aged 51–52); Canberra, Australia
- Occupation: Linguist

Academic background
- Education: Australian National University
- Thesis: The Ndu languages (1965)
- Doctoral advisor: Stephen Wurm

Academic work
- Main interests: Papuan languages

Donald C. Laycock (1936 – 27 December 1988) was an Australian linguist and anthropologist. He is best remembered for his work on the languages of Papua New Guinea.

== Biography ==
He was a graduate of University of Newcastle, New South Wales, Australia and later worked as a researcher at the University of Adelaide in Anthropology. He undertook his Ph.D. at the Australian National University in linguistics and became one among the leading authorities on the languages of Papua New Guinea.

He performed several pioneering surveys of the languages of the Sepik region of New Guinea. The first of these, his Ph.D. research under the supervision of Stephen Wurm, was published as The Ndu languages (1965), and established the existence of this closely related group of languages. In subsequent surveys, Laycock found the Ndu languages were part of a larger language family extending through the middle and upper Sepik valley (the "Sepik subphylum"), and in 1973 he proposed that these languages formed part of a Sepik–Ramu phylum. This remained the general consensus in the linguistic world for over 30 years. While more recent work by William A. Foley and Malcolm Ross has cast doubt on a link between the Ramu – Lower Sepik languages and the Sepik languages, the "Sepik subphylum" seems established as a genuine group.

Laycock also first identified the Torricelli (1968) and Piawi groups of languages. He published numerous papers in linguistics and anthropology.

He was described by his fellow authors of Skeptical (David Vernon, Colin Groves and Simon Brown) as a 20th-century 'Renaissance Man' as his interests were wide-ranging from Melanesian languages, to channelling, Tarot cards and bawdy songs.

He was a Fellow of the Australian Academy of the Humanities (FAHA), Vice President of the Australian Linguistic Society (ALS) and a member of Mensa. A keen member of the Australian Skeptics he entertained many people at Skeptic's conventions with his demonstrations of glossolalia and going into trances. After his death, Laycock's meticulous work on the Enochian 'language' (which was allegedly channelled to an associate of the Elizabethan mystic John Dee) was turned by a colleague into one of the very few classics of skeptical linguistics.

He died, after a short illness, in Canberra, on 27 December 1988.

== See also ==
- Kwomtari–Baibai languages
- Papuan languages

== Selected bibliography ==
- The Ndu language family (Sepik District, New Guinea). Pacific Linguistics C-1. Canberra: Pacific Linguistics, 1965. doi:10.15144/PL-C1
- "Languages of the Lumi subdistrict (West Sepik district), New Guinea." Oceanic Linguistics 7: 36–66. 1968.
- Sepik languages - checklist and preliminary classification. Pacific Linguistics B-25. Canberra, 1973. doi:10.15144/PL-B25
- (with John Z'graggen) "The Sepik–Ramu phylum." In: Stephen A. Wurm, ed. Papuan languages and the New Guinea linguistic scene: New Guinea area languages and language study 1. Pacific Linguistics C-38. 731–763. Canberra, 1975. doi:10.15144/PL-C38.731
- The Complete Enochian Dictionary: A Dictionary of the Angelic Language as Revealed to Dr. John Dee and Edward Kelley, London: Askin Publishers. 1978.
- The Best Bawdry, Angus & Robertson, Sydney, 1982.
- The World's Best Dirty Songs, Angus & Robertson, North Ryde, 1987, ISBN 0-207-15408-2.
- (with Alice Buffet) Speak Norfuk Today, Norfolk Island, 1988.
- Skeptical Eds. Don Laycock, David Vernon, Colin Groves, Simon Brown, Canberra Skeptics, 1989, ISBN 0-7316-5794-2.
- A Dictionary of Buin, a language of Bougainville, ed. Masayuki Onishi (Pacific Linguistics 537, 2003). ISBN 0-85883-511-8. (published posthumously)
