= David Vernon (writer) =

Australian writer and publisher

David Vernon

David Vernon (born 1965 in Canberra, Australia) is an Australian writer and publisher. He has published several books relating to scepticism and childbirth.

== Biography ==
Vernon is the only son of Michael Vernon and Jeanette Vernon. He established two businesses while at University, Whiahwe Waiting Services that provided catering to diplomatic missions in Canberra, and MangoSoft, a software development house. He graduated from the Australian National University with qualifications in political science and economics in 1988. He subsequently obtained a Graduate Diploma in Law from University of Canberra and completed a Master of Environmental Science from Griffith University. He was editor of Argos, the Journal of the Canberra Skeptics from 1986 until 1991. He was assistant editor of the Australian Sinclair Gazette. He later became a contributor to the journal of the Australian Skeptics, The Skeptic. He writes occasional science articles for The Canberra Times and also writes short stories for adults and children.

He spent ten years working in the Australian Public Service, working in the Attorney-General's Department and the Environment Department before resigning in 2007. He was Chair of the Lyneham Primary School Board from 2008 to 2012. He was elected chair of the Gold Creek School in 2011 and Chair of Gungahlin College in 2015. He was elected member of the Board of the ACT Writers Centre in 2012 and in 2013 was elected Deputy Chair. In 2014 he was elected Chair of the Centre.

He co-edited the book Skeptical – A handbook of pseudoscience and the paranormal in 1989 with Donald Laycock, Colin Groves and Simon Brown. In 2005 he released Having a Great Birth in Australia, which examined the culture of childbirth and pregnancy in Australia. In 2006 his book Men at Birth which chronicles men's experience of birth, was published. On 31 May 2007, With Women was released. He is currently working on The Hunt for Marasmus and a book about perinatal depression called Australians Talk – surviving perinatal depression.

On 13 December 2007 his book Men at Birth was awarded Best Non-Fiction Book for 2007 in the 2007 ACT Writing and Publishing Awards

He is married to Barbara Vernon with two children.

== Published works ==
- Skeptical – A handbook of pseudoscience and the paranormal, Don Laycock, David Vernon, Colin Groves, Simon Brown (eds), Imagecraft, Canberra, 1989 ISBN 0-7316-5794-2
- Having a Great Birth in Australia, Edited by David Vernon, Australian College of Midwives, Canberra, 2005, ISBN 0-9751674-3-X
- Men at Birth, Edited by David Vernon, Australian College of Midwives, Canberra, 2006, ISBN 0-9751674-4-8
- With Women, Edited by David Vernon, Australian College of Midwives, Canberra, 2007, ISBN 978-0-9751674-5-8
- The Umbrella's Shade and other award-winning stories from the Stringybark Short Story Award, Edited by David Vernon, Stringybark Publishing, Canberra, 2011, ISBN 9781458179883
- Men at Birth 2nd Edition, Edited by David Vernon, Finch Publishing, Sydney, 2011, ISBN 978-1-921462-23-8
- Between Heaven and Hell and other award-winning stories from the Stringybark Flash Fiction Award, Edited by David Vernon, Stringybark Publishing, Canberra, 2011, ISBN 978-0-9870922-2-9
- Our Name Wasn't Written – A Malta Memoir – 1936–1943, by Caroline Vernon, Edited by David Vernon, Stringybark Publishing, Canberra, 2011, ISBN 9781458197887
- A Visit from the Duchess – and other award-winning stories from the Stringybark Speculative Fiction Award. Edited by David Vernon, Stringybark Publishing, Canberra, 2011, ISBN 978-0-9870922-4-3
- Birth Stories – Real and inspiring accounts from Australian women, Edited by David Vernon, Finch Publishing, Sydney, 2011, ISBN 978-1-921462-28-3
- The Heat Wave of '76 and other award-winning stories from the Stringybark Erotic Fiction Award Edited by David Vernon, Stringybark Publishing, Canberra, 2011, ISBN 978-0-9870922-6-7
- The Bridge – 21 short stories from the Stringybark Fiction Awards Edited by David Vernon, Stringybark Publishing, Canberra, 2011, ISBN 978-0-9870922-5-0
- Marngrook and other award-winning stories from the Stringybark Australian History Award Edited by David Vernon, Stringybark Publishing, Canberra, 2011, ISBN 978-0-9870922-8-1
- Into the Darkness – One Young Australian's Journey from Sydney to the deadly skies over Germany 1939–1945 by Arthur Hoyle, DFC, Edited by David Vernon, Stringybark Publishing, Canberra, 2012, ISBN 978-0987092274
- The Road Home and other award-winning stories from the Stringybark Short Story Awards Edited by David Vernon, Stringybark Publishing, Canberra, 2012, ISBN 9780987092298
- Between the Sheets – seventeen short stories from the Stringybark Erotic Fiction Awards Edited by David Vernon, Stringybark Publishing, Canberra, 2012, ISBN 9780987255808
- Tainted Innocence and other award-winning short stories from the Twisted Stringybark Award Edited by David Vernon, Stringybark Publishing, Canberra, 2012, ISBN 978-0-9872558-1-5
- The Seven Deadly Sins and other award-winning stories from the Stringybark Seven Deadly Sins Short Fiction Award Edited by David Vernon, Stringybark Publishing, Canberra, 2012, ISBN 978-0-987255-83-9
- Write for Your Life Compiled by David Vernon, Stringybark Publishing, Canberra, 2012, ISBN 978-0-9872558-4-6
- Yellow Pearl – Eighteen short stories from the Stringybark Australian History Awards, Selected and edited by David Vernon, Stringybark Publishing, Canberra, 2012, ISBN 978-0-9872558-2-2
- Tainted Innocence - and other award-winning short stories from the Twisted Stringybark Award, Edited by David Vernon, Stringybark Publishing, Canberra, 2012, ISBN 9780987255815
- Behind the Wattles - 77 award-winning short stories from the Stringybark Flash and Microfiction Awards, Edited by David Vernon, Stringybark Publishing, Canberra. 2012 ISBN 9780987255853
- Fight or Flight - 20 award-winning stories from the Stringybark Young Adult Short Fiction Awards. Edited by David Vernon, Stringybark Publishing, Canberra, 2013 ISBN 9780987255884
- The Very End of the Affair - twenty-seven award-winning stories from the Stringybark Humorous Short Fiction Award, Edited by David Vernon, Stringybark Publishing, Canberra, 2013 ISBN 9781301589449
- Hitler Did It - twenty-one short stories from the Stringybark Short Story Awards, Edited and selected by David Vernon, Stringybark Publishing, Canberra, 2013, ISBN 9781301810017
- Valentine's Day - twenty-three award-winning stories from the Stringybark Erotic Fiction Awards, Edited by David Vernon, Stringybark Publishing, Canberra, 2013, ISBN 9780987523914
