= Auwe-Daonda language =

Border language spoken in Papua New Guinea

Auwe-Daonda
- Native to: Papua New Guinea
- Region: Sandaun Province
- Native speakers: 580 (2003)
- Language family: Border: Bewani Range; Bapi River; Auwe-Daonda
- Dialects: Auwe (Simog); Daonda

Language codes
- ISO 639-3: dnd – inclusive code Individual codes: smf – Auwe dnd – Daonda
- Glottolog: auwe1239 Auwe daon1243 Daonda
- ELP: Auwe; Daonda
- Coordinates: 3.315248°S 141.245782°E

Auwe-Daonda is a Papuan language of Sandaun Province, Papua New Guinea. Auwe is spoken in Simog (Smock) (3.315248°S 141.245782°E) and Watape (3.298019°S 141.295335°E) villages of Smock ward, Walsa Rural LLG. Daonda is spoken near Imonda in Daondai ward (3.295883°S 141.201842°E), Walsa Rural LLG, Sandaun Province.
