= Aheri, Papua New Guinea =

Aheri
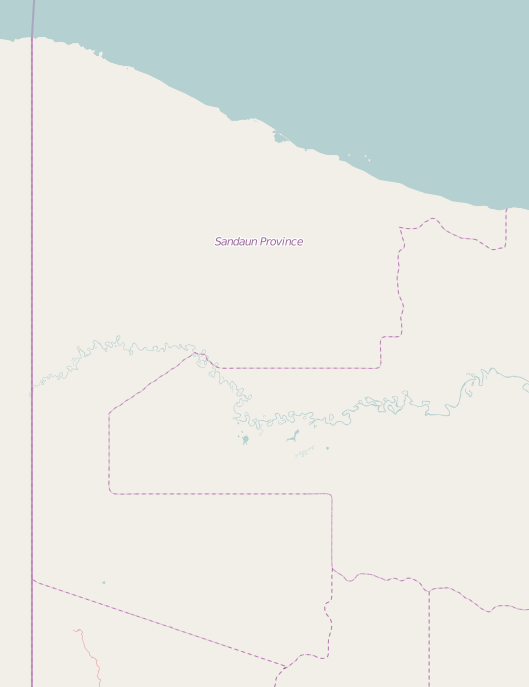
- Location within Sandaun Province
- Coordinates: 3°34′2″S 141°11′21″E
- Country: Papua New Guinea
- Province: Sandaun Province (West Sepik)
- LLG: Amanab Rural LLG

Population (1990)
  - Total: 122
- Time zone: UTC+10 (AEST)

Aheri is a village in Anamab Rural Local Level Government area, Vanimo-Green River District, Sandaun Province in Papua New Guinea.
