= Bapi River =

River in Papua New Guinea

Bapi River Keri River
- Location within Papua New Guinea

Location
- Country: Papua New Guinea
- Region: Sandaun Province

Physical characteristics
- Source
  - location: Papua New Guinea
- Mouth
  - coordinates: 3°29′16″S 141°18′25″E

The Bapi River or Keri River is a river in northern Papua New Guinea.

== See also ==
- List of rivers of Papua New Guinea
- Bapi River languages
