= Manem language =

Language of Papua New Guinea and Papua, Indonesia

Manem
- Jeti
- Native to: Indonesia, Papua New Guinea
- Region: Sandaun Province (PNG); Mannem District, Keerom Regency, Papua (Indonesia)
- Native speakers: (400 in Indonesia cited 1978); 500 in PNG (1993)
- Language family: Border: Bewani Range; Manem

Language codes
- ISO 639-3: jet
- Glottolog: mane1266
- ELP: Manem

Manem, or Jeti (Yeti), is a Papuan language of Sandaun Province, Papua New Guinea, and Keerom Regency, Papua, Indonesia.

In Indonesia, it is spoken in several villages in Mannem District and Arso Timur District, including Yeti, Wembi, and Kibay.
