= Arthur Hoyle =

Australian historian and biographer

Arthur Robert Hoyle (1922 – 2 May 2012) was an Australian historian and biographer. Born in Sydney, New South Wales, Australia, in 1922 to Arthur Hoyle (1896–1971) and Gertrude Underwood (1895–1972), he served in the Royal Air Force as a navigator during World War II with 460 Squadron and was awarded the Distinguished Flying Cross. Hoyle returned to Australia and married Moira Peisley (1924–1998). He had four sons, Arthur Marshall Hoyle Phillip, Warwick and Andrew (dec).

He served in the Australian Public Service and later taught Administration at the University of Canberra. He held the degrees of BA (Hons) and Dip Ed (University of Sydney) and M.SocSci (University of Birmingham).

He is best known for his biographies.

He died on 2 May 2012 at Calvary Retirement Community Canberra.

== Biographies ==
- King O'Malley: The American Bounder, A. R. Hoyle, Macmillan, Melbourne, 1981
- Roderick Flanagan: A bright flame too soon extinguished, A. R. Hoyle, SP, Canberra, 1988
- Into the Darkness: A personal memoir (Autobiography), A.R. Hoyle, SP, Canberra, 1989
- Eddie Ward: The Truest Labor Man, A. R. Hoyle, SP, Canberra, 1994
- The Life of John Hunter: Navigator, Governor, Admiral, A. R. Hoyle, Mulini Press, Canberra, 2001
- Hughie Edwards VC: The Fortunate Airman, A. R. Hoyle, Mulini Press, Canberra, 2001

== Autobiography ==
- Into the Darkness – One Young Australian's Journey from Sydney to the deadly skies over Germany 1939–1945 by Arthur Hoyle, DFC, Edited by David Vernon, Stringybark Publishing, Canberra, 2012, ISBN 978-0-9870922-7-4
