= Elseng language =

Isolate language spoken in Indonesia

Elseng
- Morwap
- Region: Papua, Indonesia: Jayapura and Keerom regencies - Abepura, Arso, Kemtuk Gresi, and Senggi districts; Lake Sentani area - south, southwest.
- Native speakers: 300 (2018)
- Language family: Border or language isolate: Elseng

Language codes
- ISO 639-3: mrf
- Glottolog: else1239
- ELP: Elseng

Elseng (Morwap, Janggu, Sawa, Tabu) is a poorly documented Papuan language spoken by about 300 people (in 1991) in the Indonesian province of Papua. It is also known as Morwap, which means "what is it?" 'Morwap' is vigorously rejected as a language name by speakers and government officials.

Elseng is spoken in Omon village, Gresi Selatan district, Jayapura Regency; it is also called Tabu or Tapu.

== Classification ==
Laycock classified Elseng as a language isolate but noted pronominal similarities with the Border languages. Ross included it in Border because of these similarities but noted that it does not appear to share any lexical similarities with the family. However, this may be an effect of the paucity of data on Elseng. Foley similarly classifies Elseng as an isolate.

An automated computational analysis (ASJP 4) by Müller et al. (2013) also found lexical similarities with the Border languages.

== Phonology ==
Consonants:
		Bilabial	Alveolar	Palatal	Velar
Plosive	voiceless	p	t		k
Plosive	voiced	b			g
Plosive	prenas.	ᵐb			ᵑɡ
Nasal		m	n		ŋ
Fricative	voiceless	f	s		
Fricative	voiced	v			
Approximant		w	l	j	

Vowels:
	Front	Central	Back
Close	i		u
Mid	e	ə	
Open	a		

== Pronouns ==
Pronouns are:

	sg	pl
1excl	ka	kam
1incl	yo	
2	so	sem
3	yi	

== Basic vocabulary ==
Elseng basic vocabulary from Menanti (2005), quoted in Foley (2018):

Elseng basic vocabulary
gloss	Elseng
'bird'	bisyas
'blood'	sakwos
'bone'	wok
'breast'	pan
'ear'	waskwos
'eat'	tou
'egg'	syungwin
'eye'	nafon
'fire'	bət
'give'	venenggiʔ
'go'	gele
'ground'	mo
'hair'	nimbias
'hear'	sɨkwen
'leg'	poksən
'louse'	ku
'man'	seseu
'moon'	məm
'name'	tin
'road, path'	mol
'see'	nɨnggwen
'sky'	kuil
'stone'	səpak
'sun'	ningnaf
'tongue'	mosən
'tooth'	an
'tree'	sək
'water'	vetev
'woman'	saun

The following basic vocabulary words are from Voorhoeve (1971, 1975), as cited in the Trans-New Guinea database:

gloss	Elseng
head	walambiap
hair	nimbias
ear	mo; uskŋs
eye	naf
nose	sənpokep
tooth	an
tongue	mɔs; mɔsən
leg	pokəs
louse	ku
dog	wəs
pig	wo
bird	bisjas; bisyas
egg	suŋun
blood	wətwən
bone	ok
skin	son; sɔn
breast	pan
tree	sək
man	sisɛu; sisew
woman	saɔ
sun	ninaf
moon	mɔm
water	wətel; wətəl
fire	bot; bɔt
stone	səpat
road, path	mul
eat	to

== Sentences and phrases ==
Example sentences and phrases in Elseng:

ka makən teti
1 POSS father
'my/our father'

waso amsan
man good
'good man'

tele si fa-san
father garden work-?
'Father is working (his) garden.'

tele bas to-san
father ? eat-?
'Father is eating.'
