= Pual River =

River in Papua New Guinea

- Location within Papua New Guinea

Location
- Country: Papua New Guinea
- Region: Sandaun Province

Physical characteristics
- Source
  - location: Papua New Guinea
- Mouth
  - coordinates: 2°44′56″S 141°27′14″E

The Pual River (also rendered Poal, Pua, Po, and formerly Neumayer, Neumeyer, Nemayer) is a river in northern Papua New Guinea.

== See also ==
- List of rivers of Papua New Guinea
- Poal River languages
