= National Maternity Action Plan =

The National Maternity Action Plan (NMAP) is an Australian document prepared by maternity consumer groups to alter the way Governments fund and resource maternity services.

== History ==
The plan was drafted in 2002 by Dr Barbara Vernon Dr Tracy Reibel, and Dr Sally Tracy as representatives of the Maternity Coalition. It arose out of the recognition that up to 2002, States and Territory maternity lobby groups had worked independently for change, but until they were united in seeking the same outcomes, the Federal and State Governments would not change funding methods.

The Plan was launched on 24 September 2002 simultaneously in Canberra, Sydney, Melbourne, Adelaide and Perth. The plan was launched at Parliament House in Canberra by:

- Dr Carmen Lawrence, Shadow Minister for the Status of Women, Australian Labor Party
- Senator Kerry Nettle, Australian Greens
- Senator Aden Ridgeway, Australian Democrats
- Senator Meg Lees (Independent)
- Jackie Kelly, Parliamentary Secretary to the Prime Minister

The Plan was subsequently launched in Mount Gambier in South Australia and Mareeba in Queensland.

== Content ==
The NMAP was prepared by a broad coalition of consumer and midwifery representatives and organisations from across Australia. The NMAP outlines the rationale behind the need for major reform of maternity services, and, proposes a strategy for Federal and State/Territory governments to enable comprehensive implementation of community midwifery services in both urban and regional/rural Australia within the public health system.

The NMAP calls on both Federal and State/Territory governments to facilitate substantial change to the way in which maternity services are provided, by making available to all women the choice of having a community midwife provide continuous maternity care through the publicly funded health system.

Community midwifery services in the main provide continuity of midwifery led care to healthy women throughout the childbearing continuum, in collaboration with other practitioners such as general practitioners and specialist obstetricians, where indicated. Midwives are able to follow individual women across the interface between community and acute health services and to provide care to each woman from early in her pregnancy until the baby is 4–6 weeks of age.

Universal access to continuity of midwifery care will ensure savings in health dollars and bring Australia into line with international best practice in addition to meeting community demands for a range of readily accessible and appropriate maternity services. Community midwifery is informed by international best practice standards that acknowledge midwives as “the most appropriate and cost effective type of health care provider to be assigned to the care of women in normal pregnancy and birth, including the risk assessment and the recognition of complications” (World Health Organization, 1999, Care in Normal Birth). In other western countries, particularly in the United Kingdom, New Zealand and Canada, midwifery is promoted and funded both as a public health and a primary health strategy, since community based care from midwives can be responsive to local needs, particularly with regard to health inequalities and social exclusion.

Continuity of midwifery care has been proven to result in fewer women needing expensive obstetric interventions, such as caesarean surgery and operative deliveries. Research also shows that such care contributes to long-term breastfeeding, improved adjustment to parenting, and may lower the incidence of postnatal depression. Widespread access for pregnant women and their families to continuous care provided by community midwives would:

- Provide women with care that is as safe as current routine care
- Provide women with the choice of a midwife as their lead maternity carer in line with international best practice
- Improve maternal and infant outcomes
- Reduce the need for costly obstetric interventions in childbirth for the majority of pregnant women
- Be at least as, if not more cost effective than conventional models of maternity care.
