= Angor language =

Senagi language of Papua New Guinea

Angor
- Senagi
- Region: Papua New Guinea: Sandaun Province, Amanab Rural LLG, 11 villages
- Native speakers: 1,500 (2004)
- Language family: Senagi: Angor

Language codes
- ISO 639-3: agg
- Glottolog: ango1254
- ELP: Angor
- Coordinates: 3.681265°S 141.20755°E

Angor (Anggor) a.k.a. Senagi is a Senagi language of northern Papua New Guinea. It is spoken in 11 villages of Amanab Rural LLG, Sandaun Province, including Senagi village (3.681265°S 141.20755°E) of Bibriari ward.

== Dialects ==
Dialects are Wai (Central Anggor) and Samanai (Southern Anggor).

Loving and Bass (1964) list these Anggor dialects and their villages:

- Western: Mongo
- Central west: Amandan (3.690148°S 141.168092°E), Fisi, Kwaraman (3.651891°S 141.156937°E), Puramen (3.650583°S 141.17401°E)
- Central east: Akrani, Baribari, Bibriari (3.662695°S 141.213604°E), Merere, Nai (3.624291°S 141.289758°E), Senagi (3.681265°S 141.20755°E), Unupuwai, Wamu (3.669845°S 141.229746°E)
- Southern: Samanai

== Writing system ==
Angor alphabet
| Orthography | | IPA |
|---|---|---|
| A | a | /ɑ/ |
| B | b | /b/ |
| D | d | /d/ |
| E | e | /e/ |
| F | f | /ɸ/ |
| G | g | /ɡ/ |
| H | h | /x/ |
| I | i | /i/ |
| Ɨ | ɨ | /ə/ |
| K | k | /k/ |
| M | m | /m/ |
| Mb | mb | /ᵐb/ |
| N | n | /n/ |
| Nd | nd | /ⁿd/ |
| Ŋ | ŋ | /ŋ/ |
| Ŋg | ŋg | /ᵑɡ/ |
| O | o | /o/ |
| P | p | /p/ |
| R | r | /ɾ/ |
| S | s | /s/ |
| T | t | /t/ |
| U | u | /u/ |
| Ü | ü | /ɨ/ |
| W | w | /w/ |
| Y | y | /j/ |

== Phonology ==
=== Consonants ===
Angor has the following 18 consonants.

| | | Labial | Alveolar | Palatal | Velar |
|---|---|---|---|---|---|
| Nasal | voiced | m | n | | ŋ |
| Plosive | voiceless | p | t | | k |
| Plosive | voiced | b | d | | g |
| Plosive | prenasalized | ᵐb | ⁿd | | ᵑɡ |
| Fricative | | ɸ | s | | x |
| Tap/Flap | | | ɾ | | |
| Approximant | | w | | j | |

Litteral notes the following allophonic processes:

- /ɸ/ is voiced [β] word medially.
- /x/ is voiced [ɣ] word medially.
- /ɾ/ is sometimes retroflexed after /a/.
- Final unstressed vowels, especially /ə/, tend to be elided in speech after voiceless plosives /p t k/, prenasalized plosives /ᵐb ⁿd/, and /m n ŋ x/. Prenasalized consonants are pronounced voiceless and aspirated in this position.

=== Vowels ===
==== Monophthongs ====
Angor has the following 7 monophthongs.

| | Front | Central | Back |
|---|---|---|---|
| Close | i | ɨ | u |
| Close-mid | e (Note: Foley did not explicitly label these as close-mid, but they are written higher than /ə/ in the vowel diagram.) | | o |
| Mid | | ə | |
| Open | | a | |

==== Diphthongs ====
| | Phoneme | Orthography | Gloss |
|---|---|---|---|
| Closing | /ai/ | kaiahɨ | white cockatoo |
| Closing | /ai/ | hai | fire |
| Closing | /au/ | nau | like.V.COMP |
| Closing | /au/ | bau | father |
| Closing | /ao/ | penao | knife |
| Closing | /ao/ | sao | give.me.IMP |
| Closing | /ei/ | ahei | go.3FPL |
| Closing | /o.u/ (Note: /o.u/ is technically a vowel sequence) | hou | COMPL.3MPL |
| Closing | /o.u/ | tɨ mouyanɨ | mosquito |
| Opening | /oa/ | koako | shell |
| Opening | /oa/ | gogoa | there |
| Height-harmonic | /ui/ | mbuifɨ | fingernail |
| Height-harmonic | /ui/ | yikui | papaya |
| Height-harmonic | /oe/ | hoeyembɨ | sugarcane |
| Height-harmonic | /oe/ | baboe | type of banana |
| Height-harmonic | /oe/ | nɨmoei | stone |

Litteral notes the following allophonic processes:

- /e/ tends to be phonetically a glide [eɪ̯] in the medial position (e.g., tefɨ [teɪ̯βə] 'tongue').
- /o/ is generally [ɔ] before [ⁿd] and [ɾ].
