= Roderick Flanagan =

Irish historian, poet, and journalist

- Born: 1 April 1828; Elphin, County Roscommon, Ireland
- Died: 13 March 1862 (aged 33); London, England
- Occupation: Poet

Roderick Flanagan (1 April 1828 – 13 March 1862) was an Irish historian, anthropologist, poet, newspaper proprietor, and journalist. He was born in Elphin, County Roscommon, Ireland and died when he was 34 years of age in East London, after spending 22 years in Australia. However, in that short span he made a major contribution to the understanding of Indigenous Australians, established a newspaper in Melbourne, wrote many poems and prose about his adopted land, and wrote a major history of New South Wales which into the beginning of the 20th century was considered to be the main reference work on the early European presence in Australia.

== Early life ==
Born in Ireland on 1 April 1828 to Patrick Flanagan (hatter and woolsorter) and Martha Dufficy (daughter of Henry Dufficy – farmer), he and his family emigrated to Australia aboard the emigrant ship Crusader on 15 January 1840 to escape the overpopulation and famine which was raging throughout Ireland.

He arrived in Australia with his family on 10 October 1840, although two young sons died on the journey. He was educated at the famous Ryder School in Sydney for three years and then was apprenticed to a printer. Shortly after this he commenced work at Sir Henry Parkes newspaper The People's Advocate and New South Wales Vindicator. He left in 1849 to work for the Daily News in Melbourne.

== From journalist to historian ==
In 1850 Flanagan teamed up with his younger brother to establish their own Melbourne newspaper, The Weekly Chronicle. However, with the discovery of gold in Victoria in 1851, his readership seemed more interested in the yellow metal, than his newspaper and it closed after six months operation.

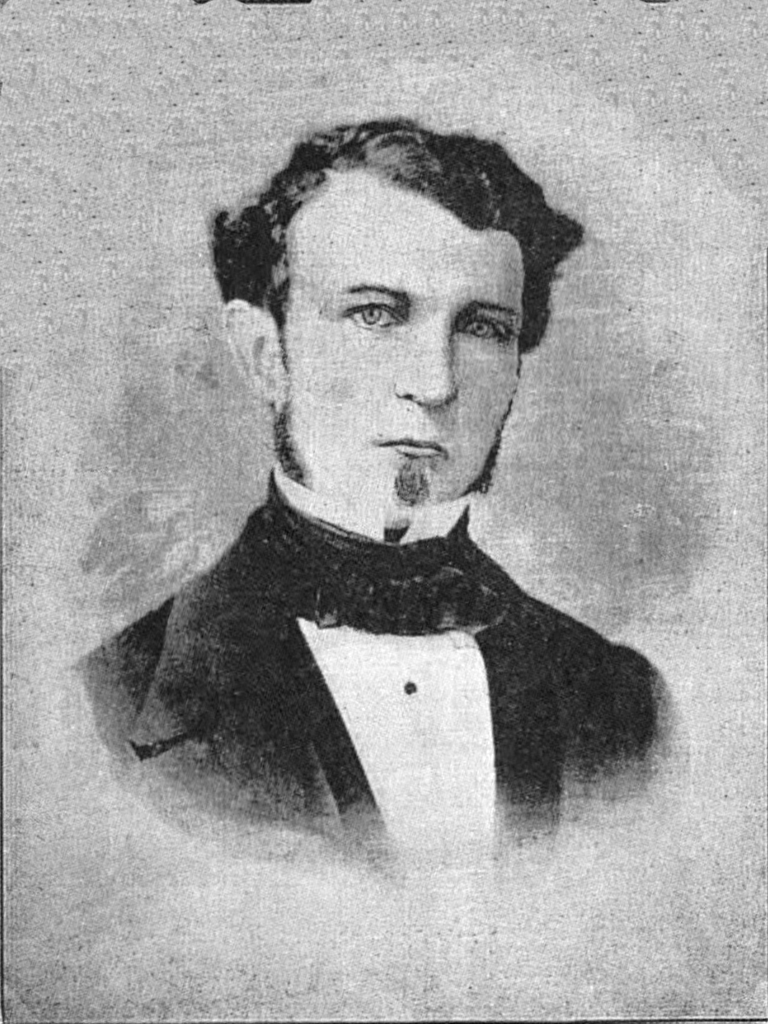
Frontispiece to The Aboriginals of Australia – "Engraved from a photograph in possession of the author's brother (Mr, E. F. Flanagan), taken in 1862"

He joined another Sir Henry Parkes paper, The Empire as a journalist. Parkes soon entered Parliament and was too busy to run his paper so he appointed Flanagan as Chief of Reporting Staff. Flanagan's poetry was published in The Empire and survives as it was collected by his brother Edward in 1887 and published as "Australian and Other Poems" in 1887.

In 1852, John Dunmore Lang, the founder of Presbyterianism in Australia published a history of New South Wales entitled "An Historical and Statistical Account of New South Wales". Flanagan thought it was a poor history which was ridden with prejudice, so he spent the next eight years writing his own book.

It was eventually published in 1862 by Sampson Low, Son and Company in London. It was entitled:

The History of New South Wales with an Account of Van Diemen's Land (Tasmania), New Zealand, Port Phillip (Victoria), Moreton Bay and other Australian Settlements. Comprising a Complete View of the Progress and Prospects of Gold Mining in Australia. The Whole Compiled from Official and Other Authentic and Original Sources.

The book was considered the standard text on Australia for many years and received considerable praise from the Sydney Morning Herald and the Empire.

Flanagan died before he saw his major work published as he contracted tuberculosis and died in cheap lodgings in London on 13 March 1862, while awaiting to see his book printed.

His brother, Edward, worked hard to keep Flanagan's legacy alive. In 1888 to commemorate one hundred years of settlement, Edward published, Flanagan's essays (that had been published in "The Empire") on the Australian Aborigines, in a slim book called The Aborigines of Australia. This book is remarkable for its sympathetic portrayal of Aborigines at a time when white Australians saw them simply as 'savages' who would die out. His entry in the Australian Dictionary of Biography describes his chapter on the Myall Creek massacre as "a restrained exercise in the use of evidence to prove guilt".

In 1988, to commemorate the bicentennial of European settlement of Australia, the Aboriginal and Torres Strait Islander Committee of the Queensland Bicentennial Council reprinted "Aborigines in Australia", claiming that reprinting "enables the earliest unbiased account of the Australian Aborigines to be re-introduced to the people of modern Australia."

== Biography ==
- Hoyle, Arthur (1988). Roderick Flanagan – A bright flame too soon extinguished. Canberra. ISBN 0858893223..
