= Waris language =

Papuan language spoken in Southeast Asia

Waris
- Region: Sandaun Province, Papua New Guinea; Waris District, Keerom Regency, Papua province, Indonesia
- Native speakers: 2,500 (2008)
- Language family: Border: Bewani Range; Bapi River; Waris
- Writing system: Latin

Language codes
- ISO 639-3: wrs
- Glottolog: wari1266
- ELP: Waris
- Coordinates: 3.294675°S 141.073027°E

Waris or Walsa is a Papuan language of northern New Guinea. There are about 2,500 native speakers. It uses the Latin writing system. The language features monophthong, diphthong, and triphthong vowels.

== Demography ==
Waris is spoken by about 2,500 people around Wasengla (3.294675°S 141.073027°E), Doponendi ward, Walsa Rural LLG, Sandaun Province, Papua New Guinea, and also by about 1,500 across the border in Waris District, Keerom Regency in the Indonesian province of Papua.

== Phonology ==
=== Vowels ===
==== Monophthongs ====
| | Front | Central | Back |
|---|---|---|---|
| Close | i | | u |
| Close-mid | e | | |
| Mid | | ə | |
| Open-mid | ɛ | | ɔ |
| Near-open | æ | | |
| Open | | a | ɒ |

==== Diphthongs and triphthongs ====
| | Vi | Vɛ | Vɑ | Vɒ | Vɔ | Vu |
|---|---|---|---|---|---|---|
| iV | | | iɑ | | | |
| ɛV | | | | | ɛɔ | ɛu |
| ɑV | ɑi | | | | ɑɔ | |
| ɒV | ɒi | | | | | |
| ɔV | ɔi | | ɔɑ | | | |
| uV | ui | uɛ | uɑ | uɒ | | |

There are two triphthongs, /ɔɑi/ and /uɛu/.

=== Consonants ===
| | | Bilabial | Alveolar | Palatal | Velar |
|---|---|---|---|---|---|
| Nasal | | m | n | | |
| Stop | Voiceless | p | t | | k |
| Stop | Prenasalised | ᵐb | ⁿd | | ᵑɡ |
| Fricative | | β | s | | x |
| Liquid | trill | | r | | |
| Liquid | lateral | | l | | |
| Semivowel | | w | | j | |

== Classifiers ==
Classifier prefixes in Waris attach to verbs, and are determined via the physical properties of the object noun phrase being referred to. Many of them have parallels with independent verb roots, which may well be where they had originated from. Examples include:

wonda ka-m mwan-vra-ho-o
netbag 1-DAT CLF-get-BEN-IMP
‘Give me a netbag.’

nenas ka-m li-ra-ho-o
pineapple 1-DAT CLF-get-BEN-IMP
‘Give me a pineapple.’

nelus ka-m ninge-ra-ho-o
greens 1-DAT CLF-get-BEN-IMP
‘Give me some greens’

Many of these prefixes have lexical parallels with verb roots. The list of classifier prefixes is:

| classifier prefix | semantic category | verb root parallel |
|---|---|---|
| mwan- | soft pliable objects like net bags, skirts, bark mats | |
| li- | fruits like pineapples, ears of corn or pandanus | le- ‘cut off oblong fruit’ |
| vela- | objects found inside a container | vela- ‘remove’ |
| put- | spherical objects, commonly fruits | puet- ‘pick fruit’ |
| ninge- | food cooked and wrapped | ninge- ‘tie up’ |
| vet- | food removed from fire without wrapping | |
| lɛ- | leaf-like objects with no or soft stem | |
| pola- | leaf-like objects with hard stem | |
| ih- | grainy materials | ih- ‘remove grainy material from a container’ |
| tuvv- | pieces cut from longer lengths | tuvva- ‘chop into lengths’ |
| kov- | lengths of vine | kovva- ‘cut off’ |
