= Busa language (Papuan) =

Language spoken in Papua New Guinea

Busa
- Odiai
- Native to: Papua New Guinea
- Region: Sandaun Province, Amanab District, north of Upper Sepik River, west of Namia. 3 villages. Yare is north and east, Abau is south and west, Biaka is northwest.
- Native speakers: 370 (2011 census)
- Language family: Senu River or Language isolate: Busa

Language codes
- ISO 639-3: bhf
- Glottolog: odia1239
- ELP: Busa
- Coordinates: 3°49′S 141°20′E

The Busa language, also known as Odiai (Uriai), is spoken in three hamlets of northwestern Papua New Guinea. There were 244 speakers at the time of the 2000 census. One of the hamlets where Busa is spoken is Busa (3.837112°S 141.440227°E) in Rawei ward, Green River Rural LLG, Sandaun Province.

Busa speakers are in extensive trade and cultural contact with Yadë, a distantly related language spoken in six villages to the north of the Busa area.

== Classification ==
Busa may be one of the Kwomtari languages. Foley (2018) classifies Busa as a language isolate (meaning unclassified), but does not exclude the possibility that it may have a distant relationship with the Torricelli languages.

== Grammar ==
=== Affixes ===
Busa subject agreement affixes are:

Busa subject agreement affixes
Person		Singular	Plural
1st		ma-	ma-
2nd		a-	a-
3rd	masculine	_r_-	m-
3rd	feminine	_w_-	

The Busa possessive suffix -ni is also found in proto-Sepik as the dative suffix *ni, as well as in Ama, a Left May language.

=== Personal pronouns ===
The personal pronouns are:

Busa basic pronouns
Person		Singular	Plural
1st		mu	mi
2nd		am	
3rd	masculine	a ~ ari	ti
3rd	feminine	tu	

== Basic vocabulary ==
Busa basic vocabulary listed in Foley (2018):

Busa basic vocabulary
gloss	Busa
‘bad’	buriambu
‘bird’	wana
‘black’	baro
‘breast’	nã
‘ear’	dina
‘eye’	dena
‘fire’	eβa
‘leaf’	iri
‘liver’	munã
‘louse’	amo
‘man’	nutu
‘mother’	mẽ
‘nape’	onaiba
‘older brother’	aba
‘road’	ti
‘stone’	bito
‘tooth’	wuti
‘tree’	nda
‘water’	ani
‘woman’	ele
‘one’	otutu
‘two’	tinana
‘three’	wunana
‘four’	aite
‘five’	yumnadi

The following basic vocabulary words are from Conrad and Dye (1975), as cited in the Trans-New Guinea database:

gloss	Busa
head	owuna
hair	etete
ear	dinʌ
eye	dena
nose	wʌti
tooth	wuti
tongue	dʌgʌrʌ
louse	amo
dog	inʌri
pig	waru
bird	wʌnʌ
egg	mʌiyʌ
blood	aɔ̨
bone	ab̶uwibʌ
skin	tati
breast	ną
tree	nda
man	nutu
woman	tɔ
water	ani
stone	bitɔ
road, path	ti
eat	muniʌren
one	otutu
two	tinʌnʌ
