= Robert Vernon =

Robert Vernon may refer to:

- Robert Vernon (musician) (born 1949), classical violist and teacher
- Robert Vernon, 1st Baron Lyveden (1800–1873), British politician, MP for Tralee, and for Northampton
- Robert Vernon (MP for Shropshire) (1577–1625), English landowner, courtier and politician
- Robert Vernon (art patron) (1774–1849), English contractor, businessman and patron of art
