= Richard Vernon (disambiguation) =

Richard Vernon (1925–1997) was a British actor.

Richard Vernon may also refer to:

- Richard Vernon (academic) (born 1945), Canadian academic
- Richard Vernon (bass) (1953–2006), American opera singer
- Richard Vernon (character), the high school principal played by Paul Gleason in the 1985 film The Breakfast Club
- Richard Vernon (musician) (born 1962), British musician
- Richard Vernon (speaker) (c. 1389–1451), English politician and speaker of the House of Commons
- Sir Richard Vernon, 3rd Baronet (1678–1725), English diplomat
- Richard Vernon (MP) (1726–1800), British horse breeder, trainer and politician
- Dick Vernon (1878–1954), Australian rules footballer
- Richard Vernon (born 1989), Educator and Company Director
