= Taikat language =

Language

Taikat
- Arso
- Native to: Indonesia
- Region: Papua province
- Ethnicity: Taikat people
- Native speakers: (500 cited 2000)
- Language family: Border: Upper Tami; Taikat

Language codes
- ISO 639-3: aos
- Glottolog: taik1255
- ELP: Taikat

Taikat (Daiget) or Arso is a Papuan language of Indonesian Papua.

== Phonology ==
Taikat has six vowels, /a e i o u ə/.
