= Ningera language =

Papuan language of Sandaun Province

Ningera
- Native to: Papua New Guinea
- Region: Sandaun Province
- Native speakers: 150 (2003)
- Language family: Border: Bewani; Poal River; Ningera

Language codes
- ISO 639-3: nby
- Glottolog: ning1275
- ELP: Ningera

Ningera (Ninggera) is a Papuan language of Sandaun Province, Papua New Guinea.

It is spoken around Ningra ward (2.73916°S 141.435536°E) in Bewani/Wutung Onei Rural LLG, Sandaun Province.
