= Ainbai language =

Papuan language of Papua New Guinea

Ainbai
- Native to: Papua New Guinea
- Region: Sandaun Province
- Native speakers: 100 (2003)
- Language family: Border: Bewani Range; Poal River; Ainbai

Language codes
- ISO 639-3: aic
- Glottolog: ainb1238
- ELP: Ainbai
- Ainbai is classified as Severely Endangered by the UNESCO Atlas of the World's Languages in Danger.
- Coordinates: 3.090493°S 141.146645°E

Ainbai is a Papuan language of Sandaun Province, Papua New Guinea. It is spoken in Ainbai village (3.090493°S 141.146645°E), Bewani/Wutung Onei Rural LLG, Sandaun Province.

Other than Ainbai village (3.090493°S 141.146645°E), it is also spoken in Elis village (3.056925°S 141.089587°E).
