= Fas language =

Fas language of Papua New Guinea

Fas
- Momu
- Region: Sandaun Province, Papua New Guinea
- Native speakers: (2,500 cited 2000 census)
- Language family: Fas: Fas

Language codes
- ISO 639-3: fqs
- Glottolog: fass1245
- ELP: Fas
- Coordinates: 3.253331°S 141.425202°E

Fas (a.k.a. Momu, Bembi) is the eponymous language of the small Fas language family of Sandaun Province, Papua New Guinea.

Fas was once mistakenly placed in the Kwomtari family, confusing their classification. Its only demonstrated relative is actually Baibai, with which it is 40% cognate. See Fas languages for details.

== Locations ==
Ethnologue lists Fas-speaking villages as Fas (3.198947°S 141.479718°E; 3.335326°S 141.652462°E), Fugumui (3.253331°S 141.425202°E), Kilifas, Utai (3.390507°S 141.583997°E), and Wara Mayu villages of Walsa Rural LLG and Amanab Rural LLG of Sandaun Province.

Baron (2007) lists Fas-speaking villages as Yo, Sumumini, Wara Mayu, Kilifas, Fugumui, Fas 2, Fas 3, Finamui, Fugeri, Aiamina, Tamina 1, Nebike, Tamina 2, Utai, Mumuru, Savamui, and Mori.

== Phonology ==
Consonants
	Labial	Alveolar	Velar	Glottal
Plosive	p	t	k	ʔ ⟨h⟩
Fricative	f	s		
Nasal	m	n		
Trill	ʙ ⟨b⟩	r		
Approximant	w	j		

- /ʔ/ appears as [h] before /a/.

Vowels
	Front	Central	Back
High	i		u
Mid	e	(ə)	o
Low		a	

- /ə/ may be an allophone of /i/.

== Sources ==
- Baron, Wietze (1983a). "Cases of counter-feeding in Fas". Language and Linguistics in Melanesia. 14: 138–149. OCLC 9188672.
- Blake, Fiona (2007). Spatial Reference in Momu (BA thesis). The University of Sydney. hdl:2123/1919.
- Honeyman, Thomas Tout (2016). A grammar of Momu, a language of Papua New Guinea (PhD thesis). Australian National University. doi:10.25911/5d70f1b69a565. hdl:1885/132961.
