= Yalë language =

Language spoken in Papua New Guinea

Yalë
- Nagatman
- Native to: Papua New Guinea
- Region: Sandaun Province
- Native speakers: (600 cited 1991)
- Language family: Senu River or language isolate: Guriaso–Yale; Yalë

Language codes
- ISO 639-3: nce
- Glottolog: yale1246
- ELP: Yalë
- Coordinates: 3.744917°S 141.471593°E

The Yalë language, also known as Yadë, Nagatman, or Nagatiman, is spoken in northwestern Papua New Guinea. It may be related to the Kwomtari languages, but Palmer (2018) classifies it as a language isolate.

There were 600 speakers in 1991 and 30 monolinguals at an unrecorded date. Yalë is spoken in Nagatiman (3.744917°S 141.471593°E) and several other villages of Green River Rural LLG in Sandaun Province. Foley (2018) reports a total of six villages.

Yalë is in extensive trade and contact with Busa, a likely language isolate spoken just to the south. Yalë has complex verbal inflection and SOV word order.

== Phonology ==
The linguist Aidan Aannested, in a work from 2020, gives the following phonology for Yadë (Yalë):

Consonants
		Labial	Alveolar	Palatal	Velar	Glottal
Nasal		m ⟨m⟩	n ⟨n⟩			
Plosive	Voiceless	p ⟨p⟩	t ⟨t⟩		k ⟨k⟩	
Plosive	Voiced	b ~ β ⟨b⟩	d ~ ɺ ⟨d/l⟩		ɡ ~ ɣ ⟨g⟩	
Fricative		ɸ ⟨f⟩	s ⟨s⟩			h ⟨h⟩
Affricate				d͡ʑ ~ ʑ ⟨j⟩		
Approximant		w ⟨w⟩		j ⟨y⟩		

- "dd" is pronounced as a trilled [r(ː)]
- See the source for more information regarding allophones- the ones listed are just the common occurrences.

Vowels
	Front	Central	Back
Close	i ⟨i⟩		u ⟨u⟩
Close-Mid	e ⟨e⟩		o ⟨o⟩
Open-Mid	ɛ ⟨ë/ɛ⟩		
Open		a ⟨a⟩	

- Each vowel has a wide range of possible realizations, most notably /u/, which has:
  - /y/, /ʉ/, /ʊ/, and /u̟/

== Grammar ==
=== Verbs ===
Verbal conjugation affixes are:

- -d: generic marker
- -t: transitive marker
- -b: intransitive marker

=== Nouns ===
Most nouns are not pluralized, and only nouns with human or animate reference or with high local salience may be pluralized using the suffix -rɛ ~ -re:

- nɛba 'child' → nɛba-re /child-PL/ ‘children’
- ama 'dog' → ama-re /dog-PL/ ‘dogs’
- dife 'village' → dife-rɛ /village-PL/ ‘villages’

Other plural nouns are irregular:

- aya 'father' → aya-nino /father-PL/ ‘fathers’
- mise ‘woman’ → one ‘women’

=== Personal pronouns ===
The personal pronouns are:

Person	Singular	Plural
1st	bo	se ~ sebo
2nd	ju	so ~ sobo
3rd	bu	

== Basic vocabulary ==
The following basic vocabulary words are from Conrad and Dye (1975), as cited in the Trans-New Guinea database:

gloss	Yalë
head	ʌsu
hair	ʌsʌǏahuᵽa
ear	ąhuǏuʔ
eye	na:ba
nose	yɛlu
tongue	aǏižiʔ
louse	mibaʔ
dog	kaliʔ
pig	gǏɛǏiʔ
bird	pʋlɛʔ
egg	kah
blood	wi:nuʔ
bone	ɛlɛ:b̶u
skin	žib̶uʔ
breast	ma:ba
tree	ti:
woman	mɩsɛʔ
water	tuʔ
fire	ahuʐiʔ
stone	anɩziʔ
road, path	ařʌgɛʔ
eat	hiɛǏɛ
one	žuwaʔ
two	teǏɛʔ
