= Azúa =

Azúa is a surname of Basque origin. Notable people with this surname include the following:

- Carlos Real de Azúa (1916–1977), Uruguayan lawyer and historian
- Félix de Azúa (born 1944), Spanish writer
- Goizeder Azúa (born 1984), Venezuelan TV host and model
- Pedro de Vivar (1742–1820), Chilean priest and politician
