= Sowanda language =

Language in Indonesia

Sowanda
- Native to: Papua New Guinea
- Region: Sandaun Province; Papua province, Indonesia
- Native speakers: (1,500 cited 2000–2003)
- Language family: Border: Bewani Range; Bapi River; Sowanda
- Dialects: Waina; Punda; Umeda

Language codes
- ISO 639-3: Either: sow – Sowanda upi – Umeda
- Glottolog: sowa1245 Sowanda umed1238 Umeda-Punda
- ELP: Sowanda

Sowanda is a Papuan language of Sandaun Province, Papua New Guinea, with a couple hundred speakers in Indonesian Papua.

== Dialects ==
There are three divergent varieties, Waina, Punda and Umeda, which may be distinct languages. They are each spoken in three different villages of Walsa Rural LLG in Sandaun Province:

- Waina village (3.418333°S 141.050496°E), located in Waina ward
- Punda village (3.427183°S 141.110275°E), located in Punda ward
- Umeda village (3.413694°S 141.094886°E), located in Punda ward
