= Australian ZX Users' Association =

Australian computer user group

Australian Sinclair Gazette
- Editor: David Brudenall and David Vernon
- Categories: Computer magazines
- Frequency: Bi-Monthly
- Publisher: Australian ZX Users' Association
- Founded: 1981
- First issue: September 1981
- Country: Australia
- Language: English
- ISSN: 0811-4749

The Australian ZX Users' Association (AZUA) was an Australian computer users' group established in 1981 to support users of the Sinclair ZX80 and Sinclair ZX81 computers. It closed in 1986 after producing thirty-nine issues of its magazine AZUA and the Australian Sinclair Gazette.

AZUA was the idea of David Brudenall and David Vernon and they remained the editor and assistant editor, respectively, throughout the five years of its operation. Based in Canberra, Australia, AZUA was a non-profit association. It originally catered solely for the ZX80 but later supported the ZX81, ZX Spectrum and Sinclair QL produced by Clive Sinclair. AZUA published computer program listings, software reviews, provided technical assistance and the occasional short story. It also supported and promoted local user groups in all Australian States and Territories. The magazines became known for their quirky cartoons, all drawn by David Brudenall. Most of the content was written by David Brudenall or David Vernon, although reader contributions were readily included.

During the early 1980s it was the largest ZX user group in Australia. When the ZX Spectrum was introduced and members with the ZX computers dropped away, AZUA changed its name to the Australian Sinclair Gazette. Six editions of the Australian Sinclair Gazette were produced before AZUA ceased operations. The reason given for the closure was the increased competition from overseas magazines, Sinclair User and ZX Computing, and the reduction in marketing of the Sinclair computers in Australia.
