= Bernaz =

Bernaz is an Arpitan surname chiefly found in the area of the historical province of Chablais, possibly derived from the name of the Swiss city of Bern. Like many Arpitan anthroponyms, the final -z only marks paroxytonic stress and should not be pronounced. Nevertheless, it is often pronounced in French through hypercorrection. Notable people with the surname include:

- Jean-Baptiste Bernaz (born 1987), French sailor
- Marie Bernaz (1828–1893), French murder victim
