= Barbara Vernon (activist) =

Australian maternity activist

- Born: New South Wales, Australia
- Education: Australian National University; Griffith University
- Occupations: Activist; Lobbyist; CEO

Dr Barbara Vernon is an Australian maternity activist and a government lobbyist who seeks to improve provisions for maternity services; in particular, she advocates for the use of midwives. Born in New South Wales, she moved to Canberra in the mid-1970s. She earned an Honours Degree in political science at the Australian National University and in 1997 was awarded a PhD in public policy from Griffith University in Brisbane, Queensland.

Vernon worked in the Australian Bureau of Statistics and the Commonwealth Department of the Environment, before becoming the President of the Maternity Coalition, a position she held for two years. While President, she and Tracy Reibel drafted the National Maternity Action Plan. In 2003, she was appointed Executive Officer of the Australian College of Midwives, a position which she held from 2002 to 2010. In 2008, she was appointed by Nicola Roxon, the Minister of Health, to the External Reference Group developing the National Primary Health Care Strategy.

In 2011 Vernon was appointed CEO of Women's and Children's Healthcare Australasia, an Australian and New Zealand not-for-profit that represents over 200 maternity and children's hospitals and units.

== Publications ==
- Midwifery in Australia – emerging from the shadows with Jenny Gamble in "Midwifery – freedom to practise?", ed Lindsay Reid, Churchill Livingston Elsevier, 2007, ISBN 978-0-443-10312-4
