= Senagi languages =

Language family of New Guinea

Senagi
- Geographic distribution: New Guinea (Papua New Guinea and Indonesia)
- Linguistic classification: an independent language family
- Subdivisions: Angor; Dera

Language codes
- Glottolog: sena1264

The Senagi languages are a small family of Papuan languages in the classification of Malcolm Ross, that had been part of Stephen Wurm's Trans–New Guinea proposal. They consist of the two languages Angor and Dera.

The Angor language is unusual in that it distinguishes gender in the second- and third-person dual and plural (you and they), but not in the singular. It is not clear if Dera does the same.

In Papua New Guinea, they are spoken in Amanab Rural LLG of Sandaun Province. They are also spoken across the border in Keerom Regency, Indonesia.

== Classification ==
The Senagi family consists of only two languages:

- Senagi family: Angor, Dera

The most promising external links are with the Sepik and Torricelli languages. The pronoun for "I" is reconstructed as *wan for both proto-Senagi and proto-Sepik, while the Angor masculine dual and plural pronominal suffixes -fa- and -mu- appear to reflect the proto-Sepik and proto-Torricelli dual and plural pronominal suffixes *-p and *-m.

== Pronouns ==
Pronouns are:

Senagi pronouns
	Angor	Dera
1incl	ro	
1excl	səh	yo
2	se	si
3	ai	ai

== Grammar ==
Verbal morphology in Senagi languages is highly complex and irregular.
