= Nai language =

Kwomtari language spoken in Papua New Guinea

Nai
- Biaka
- Region: Papua New Guinea
- Native speakers: 750 (2010)
- Language family: Senu River: Kwomtari–Nai; Nai

Language codes
- ISO 639-3: bio
- Glottolog: naii1241
- ELP: Nai

Nai or Biaka is a language of Papua New Guinea.

Nai is one of the Kwomtari languages. However, due to an alignment error in the published data, Nai (as Biaka) was mistakenly placed in a spurious "Baibai" family with the Fas language Baibai; this was then linked back to the Kwomtari family as "Kwomtari–Baibai". (See Kwomtari–Fas languages for details.)

== Locations ==
Ethnologue lists Biaka-speaking villages in Green River Rural LLG, (formerly within Amanab District), Sandaun Province, in three villages: Konabasi (3.735029°S 141.292563°E), Biaka (3.740668°S 141.282054°E), and Amini (3.823409°S 141.202454°E).

Baron (2007) lists Biaka-speaking villages as Konabasi, Biaka, and Amini.
