= Awyi language =

Papuan language

Awyi
- Native to: Indonesia
- Region: Papua
- Native speakers: (350 cited 2000)
- Language family: Border: Upper Tami; Awyi

Language codes
- ISO 639-3: auw
- Glottolog: awyi1241
- ELP: Awyi

Awyi (Awye, Nyao) is a Papuan language of Indonesian Papua. It is spoken in Skanto District (id), Keerom Regency.

== Phonology ==
Word list (3):

arm-kenie

ashes-ku

bird-noy

black-tubulwa

blood-keane

bone-sakər

to come-manam

dog-wŋl

to eat-na

egg-suŋul
