= Etisalat University College =

Coordinates: 25.34628°N 55.42127°E

- Type: Private college
- Established: 1989
- President: Arif Al-Hammadi
- Location: Sharjah, United Arab Emirates
- Website: www.ece.ac.ae (2008)

Etisalat University College (EUC) was a private college for men that was established by Etisalat by e& for engineering and was located in the city of Sharjah, United Arab Emirates, with programs in Engineering and Applied sciences.

The college had departments for Communication engineering, Computer engineering, Electronic engineering, and General Studies. The university college complex was designed by the Italian architect Renato Restelli, project architect for WS Atkins International, winner of a design competition held in 1986. Construction was completed in 1989.

The college was merged into Khalifa University in February 2008.

== See also ==
- Etisalat by e&
