= Caroline Vernon =

Caroline Nellie Vernon (2 August 1908 – 7 May 1988) was a writer born in Woolwich, London, England to Emma Clark (née Pearce) and Frederick Clark. She married John Ernest Vernon, a writer in the Royal Navy in 1931. In 1936 she joined her husband in Malta where she spent the next seven years. She worked as a volunteer cryptanalyst.

She had four children. Michael Vernon (1932–1993), Dorothy (1933), David (1936) and John (1943).

Her experience living on the most "bombed island on earth" during World War II was posthumously published in 1990 as Our Name Wasn't Written - A Malta Memoir. A second edition was published in 1992.

== Bibliography ==
- Our Name Wasn't Written, Caroline Vernon, 1992, Imagecraft, Canberra (2nd Ed), ISBN 0-646-07198-X
