= Michael Vernon =

Australian consumer activist

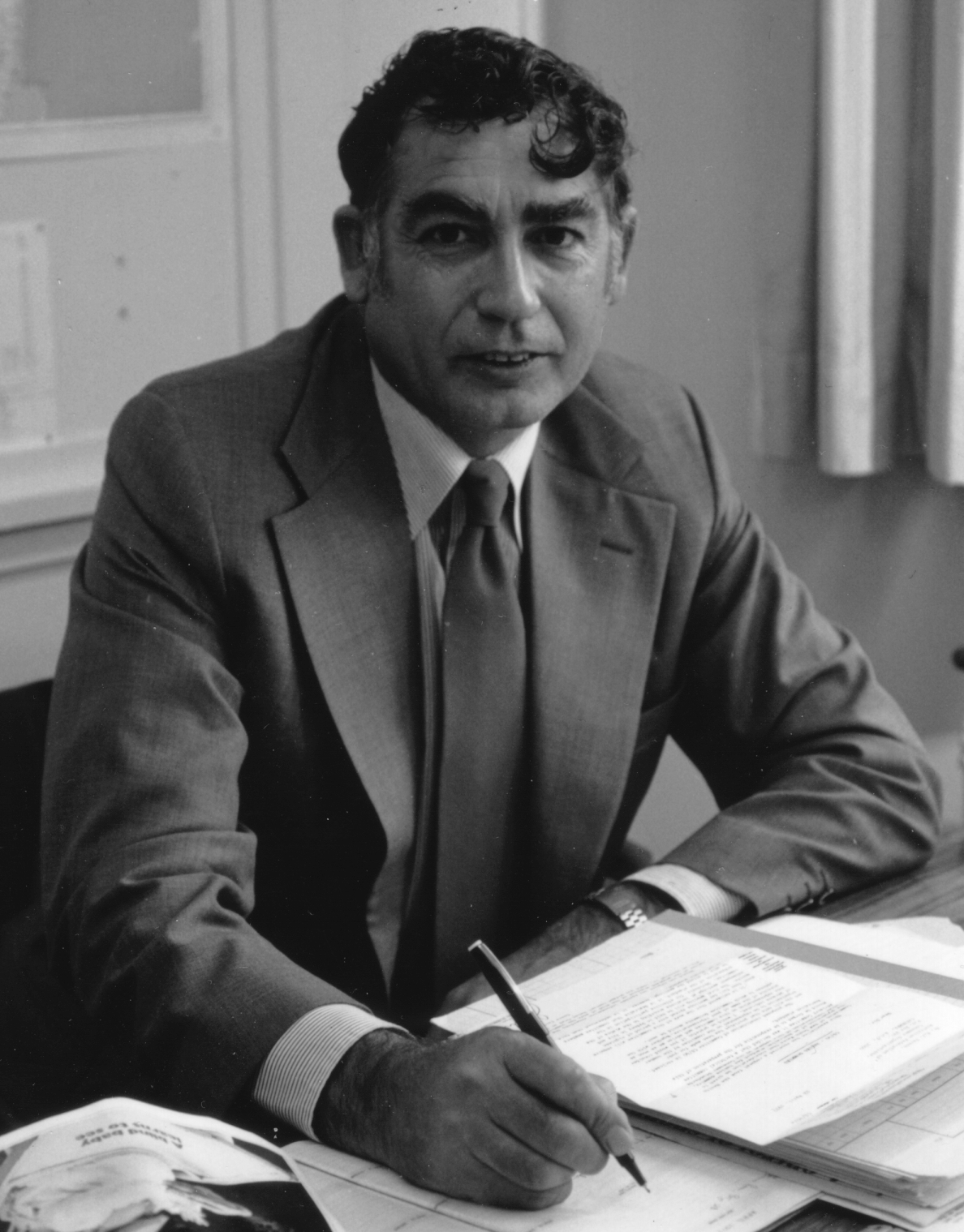
Michael J. Vernon, circa 1980

Michael J. Vernon, AM (2 April 1932 – 6 November 1993) was a prominent Australian consumer rights activist. Vernon was born in Portsmouth, United Kingdom in 1932 to John Ernest Vernon (a writer in the Royal Navy) and Caroline Clark Vernon (later a cryptologist in the Royal Navy). In 1955, he emigrated to Australia, where he settled in Canberra. He was a joint founder of Canberra Consumer (a consumer activist group and publisher of a quarterly magazine) in 1962 and served on the Executive of Canberra Consumer until his death in 1993.

He was employed by the Australian National University in 1960 and worked on the dating of Moon rocks returned to Earth by the Apollo missions.

In 1972 he became the manager of the Research School of Earth Sciences, a position he held until 1988. As an early Australian consumer activist, he was best known for his work on improving condom reliability, banning lead (Pb) and cadmium (Cd) in children's toys and house paint throughout Australia, improving car safety, banning certain pesticides in the Asia-Pacific Region, and stopping the dumping of unsafe products into Third World countries.

He was appointed Chairman of the Australian Capital Territory Consumer Affairs Council in 1973 by the Minister for Territories, Kep Enderby MP and held that position until 1993. He helped establish the Australian Federation of Consumer Organizations (AFCO) (now known as the Consumers' Federation of Australia (CFA)) and with Warren Braren of Consumers Union (USA) he turned the International Organization of Consumer Unions (IOCU) (now known as Consumers International) concept for a worldwide "Consumer Interpol" into a reality. He was a member of the Australian Press Council and held many other positions on Government boards and committees.

== Honours ==
He was made a Member of the Order of Australia in 1985 for services to consumer affairs and was also awarded the Queen Elizabeth II Silver Jubilee Medal in 1977, also for services to consumer affairs.

== Personal life and death ==
Vernon married in 1959 to Jeanette Wilkinson; the couple had two children, one of whom is writer David Vernon.

Michael Vernon died, aged 61, from a blood cancer, multiple myeloma, which was attributed to his paid work with radioactive materials at Australia's first major uranium mine in Rum Jungle in the Northern Territory and later at the Australian National University Research School of Physical Sciences and Research School of Earth Sciences.
