= Colin Groves =

British-Australian biologist and anthropologist

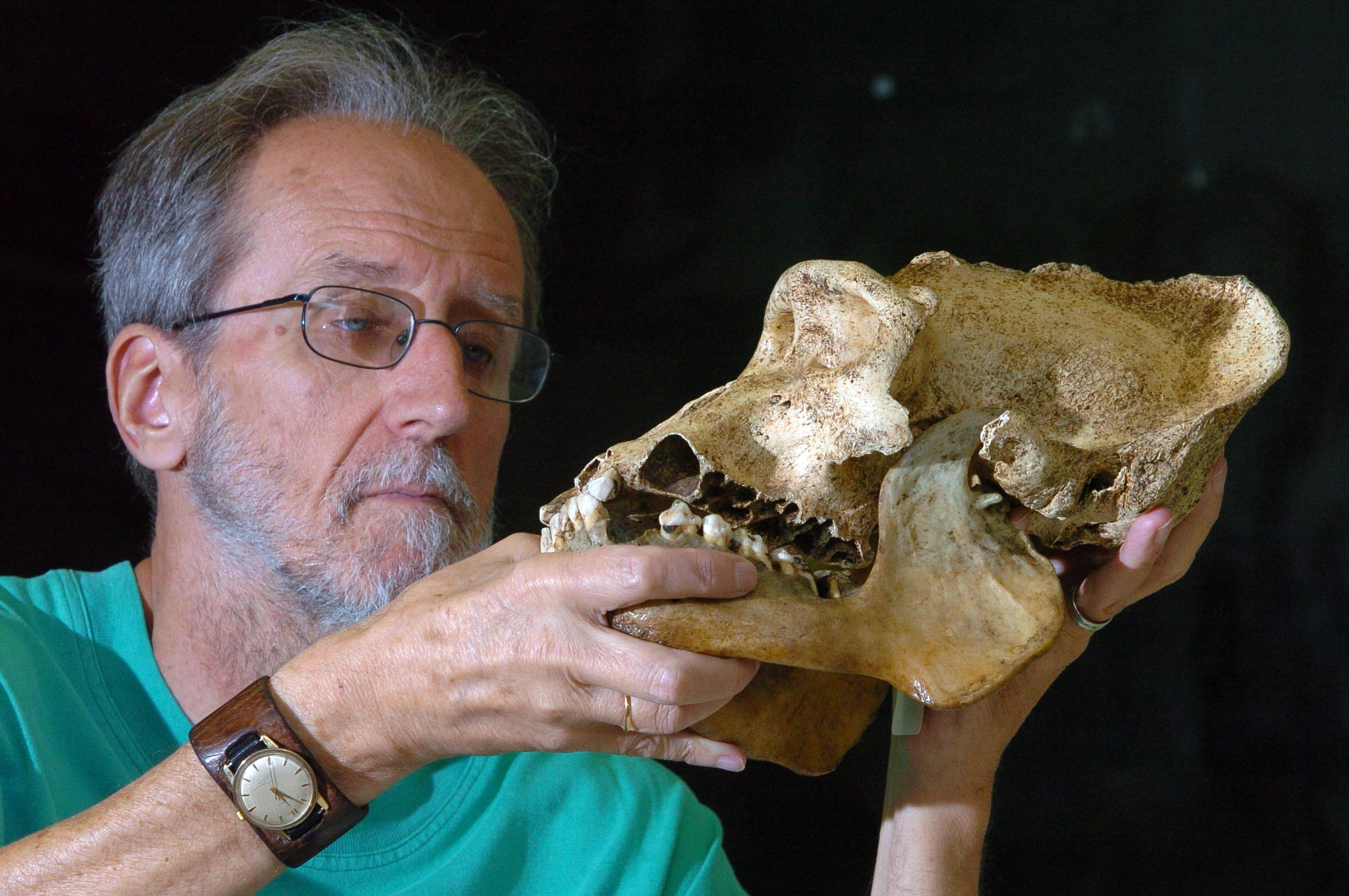
- Born: 24 June 1942; London
- Died: 30 November 2017 (aged 75); Canberra, ACT, Australia
- Education: University College London (B.Sc.); Royal Free Hospital School of Medicine (Ph.D.)
- Known for: Biological classification of Homo ergaster
- Scientific career
- Fields: Biological anthropology Palaeoanthropology; Biogeography; Primatology; Mammal classification
- Workplaces: Australian National University; University of California, Berkeley; Queen Elizabeth College; University of Cambridge

Colin Peter Groves (24 June 1942 – 30 November 2017) was a British-Australian biologist and anthropologist. Groves was professor of biological anthropology at the Australian National University in Canberra, Australia.

== Education ==
Born in England, Groves completed a Bachelor of Science at University College London in 1963, and a Doctor of Philosophy at the Royal Free Hospital School of Medicine in 1966. From 1966 to 1973, he was a postdoctoral researcher and teaching fellow at the University of California, Berkeley, Queen Elizabeth College and the University of Cambridge.

== Career ==
Groves was born in London and emigrated to Australia in 1973 and joined the Australian National University, where he was promoted to full professor in 2000 and remained emeritus professor until his death.

Along with the Czech biologist Professor Vratislav Mazák, Groves was the describer of Homo ergaster. Groves also wrote Primate Taxonomy published by the Smithsonian Institution Press in 2001, and Ungulate Taxonomy, co-authored by Peter Grubb (2011, Johns Hopkins Press).

He was an active member of the Australian Skeptics and had many published sceptical papers, as well as research papers covering his other research interests. He also conducted regular debates with creationists and anti-evolutionists. Groves opposed the arguments of creationism, stating "It is a great mistake to ignore the threat: it will not just go away, it must be countered. ... Scientists, but most especially archaeologists, are in the front line; we, not the artists or the politicians, are the ones with ammunition to stem the tide of creationist rubbish, and relegate it to Monty Python's Flying Circus where it belongs."

== Research interests ==
Groves' research interests included human evolution, primates, mammalian taxonomy, skeletal analysis, biological anthropology, ethnobiology, cryptozoology, and biogeography. He conducted extensive fieldwork in Kenya, Tanzania, Rwanda, India, Iran, China, Indonesia, Sri Lanka and the Democratic Republic of the Congo. He is credited with confirming the status of the Hatinh langur as a separate species from the François' langur in 2005.

== Death and legacy ==
Groves died on 30 November 2017 at the age of 75. In 2018, he was awarded the Lifetime Achievement Award of the International Primatological Society in 2018 in Nairobi, becoming the first posthumous person to receive this award.

== Selected publications ==
- Groves, C. (1989). A theory of human and primate evolution. New York: Oxford Science Publications. doi:10.1002/ajpa.1330810314.
- Groves, C. (1989). Laycock, D (ed.). Skeptical, a handbook on pseudoscience and the paranormal. Australian Skeptics. ISBN 0-7316-5794-2.
- Groves, C. (1996). "From Ussher to Slusher; from Archbish to Gish; or, not in a million years...". Archaeology in Oceania. 31: 145–151. doi:10.1002/j.1834-4453.1996.tb00357.x.
- Groves, C. P. (1997). "Leopard-cats, Prionailurus bengalensis (Carnivora: Felidae) from Indonesia and the Philippines, with the description of two new subspecies". Zeitschrift für Säugetierkunde. 62: 330–338.
- Groves, C. (2001). Primate Taxonomy. Washington D.C.: Smithsonian Institution Press. ISBN 1-56098-872-X.
- Cameron, D. W.; Groves, C. (2004). Bones, Stones and Molecules. Boston: Elsevier. p. 402. ISBN 0-12-156933-0.
- Groves, C. (2008). Extended Family: Long Lost Cousins. A Personal Look at the History of Primatology. Arlington, Virginia: Conservation International. p. 227. ISBN 978-1-934151-25-9.
- Groves, C.; Mcleod, K. (2014). "Birth of a notion" (PDF). The Skeptic. 34 (4). Australian Skeptics: 39.
