= Kwomtari language =

Senu River language spoken in Papua New Guinea

Kwomtari
- Native to: Papua New Guinea
- Native speakers: (600 cited 1998)
- Language family: Senu River: Kwomtari–Nai; Kwomtari

Language codes
- ISO 639-3: kwo
- Glottolog: nucl1593
- ELP: Kwomtari
- Coordinates: 3.596084°S 141.361577°E

Kwomtari is the eponymous language of the Kwomtari family of Papua New Guinea.

Spencer (2008) is a short grammar of Kwomtari. The language has an SOV constituent order and nominative–accusative alignment. Both subjects and objects are marked suffixally on the verb. Verbs are inflected for status (mood) rather than for tense or aspect.

== Locations ==
Ethnologue lists Kwomtari as spoken in six villages in Komtari (Kwomtari) ward (3.596084°S 141.361577°E), Amanab Rural LLG, Sandaun Province.

Baron (2007) lists Kwomtari-speaking villages as Mango, Kwomtari, Baiberi, Yenabi, Yau'uri, and Wagroni.

== Phonology ==
Consonant phonemes of Kwontari
	Bilabial	Alveolar	Retroflex	Velar
Plosive	p b	t		k ɡ
Nasal	m	n		
Fricative	ɸ	s		
Trill	ʙ	r		
Lateral			ɭ	

The phoneme /ɸ/ is realized as a voiced bilabial fricative [β] intervocalically and voiceless bilabial fricative [ɸ] elsewhere. The realization of the phoneme /ɭ/ is in free variation between a voiced retroflex lateral [ɭ] and a voiced retroflex stop [ɖ].

Vowel phonemes of Kwontari
	Front	Central	Back
Close	i		u
Near-close	i̞		u̞
Mid		ə	
Open-Mid	ɛ		ɔ
Open		a	

The unusual vowel phonemes /i̞/ and /u̞/ are of intermediate height between cardinal [i]/[u] and [e]/[o] respectively but without the centralization present in [ɪ] and [ʊ]. They have also been attested in Weri, a Goilalan language of south-east Papua, and certain Dani dialects.
