= Amanab Rural LLG =

Local-level government in Papua New Guinea

- Location within Papua New Guinea
- Coordinates: 3.583417°S 141.214903°E
- Country: Papua New Guinea
- Province: Sandaun Province

Population (2011 census)
  - Total: 11,869
- Time zone: UTC+10 (AEST)
- Postal code: PG150412

Amanab Rural LLG is a local-level government (LLG) of Sandaun Province, Papua New Guinea. It is located along the border with Keerom Regency, Papua Province, Indonesia.

Kwomtari languages and Senagi languages are spoken in Amanab Rural LLG.

== Wards ==
- 01. Bibriari
- 02. Porumun
- 03. Itomi
- 04. Mamamura
- 05. Wahai
- 06. Kamberatoro
- 07. Kofiniau
- 08. Iafar
- 09. Naineri
- 10. Wamuru
- 11. Aheri
- 12. Amanab
- 13. Iveig
- 14. Akraminag
- 15. Masineri-Nai 2
- 16. Utai
- 17. Guriaso
- 18. Komtari
