= Australian College of Midwives =

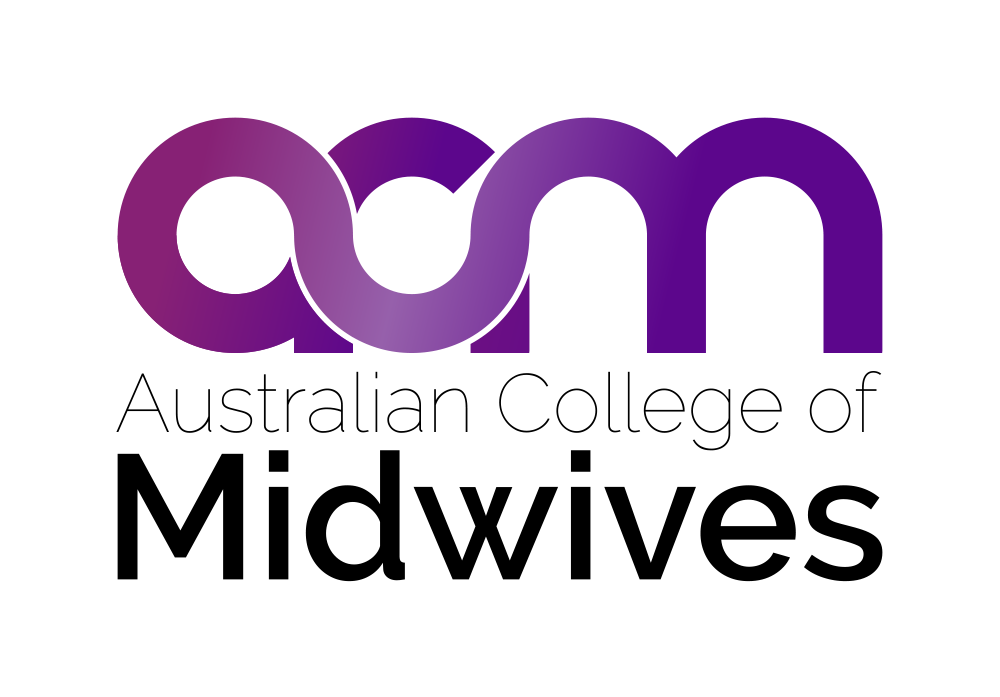
Australian College of Midwives

The Australian College of Midwives (ACM) is a professional organisation representing midwives and midwifery policy in Australia.

ACM was founded nationally in 1984, when midwifery associations in a number of states and territories came together to create a national body for Australian midwives.

ACM is a federated body consisting of at least one branch in each State and Territory that make up the National College. The national office is based in Ultimo, New South Wales, Australia.

ACM is governed by a seven-member Board of Directors, with the organisation's operations led by CEO Mia Dhillon from the national office. The midwifery advisory team is headed by Chief Midwife Kelley Lennon.
