= Senu River languages =

Language family of Papua New Guinea

Senu River
- Geographic distribution: Senu River region, Papua New Guinea
- Linguistic classification: One of the world's primary language families
- Subdivisions: Kwomtari–Nai; Guriaso–Yale; Busa

Language codes
- Glottolog: None kwom1263 (Kwomtari–Nai)
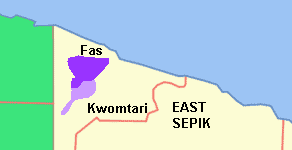
- The neighboring Kwomtari–Nai and Fas language families

The Senu River languages are a small language family spoken in the Senu River watershed of Papua New Guinea. They consist at least of the Kwomtari languages, Kwomtari and Nai, with several additional languages more distantly related to them.

== Classification ==
The family consists of at least the two relatively closely related languages Kwomtari and Nai.

=== Baron (1983) ===
Baron adds the highly divergent language Guriaso:

- Kwomtari stock
  - Guriaso
  - Kwomtari–Nai family (Nuclear Kwomtari)
    - Kwomtari
    - Nai (aka Biaka)

Guriaso shares a small number of cognates with Kwomtari–Nai. Baron (1983) considers the evidence to be convincing when a correspondence between /ɾ~l/ and /n/ (from *ɾ) is established:

Gloss	Guriaso	Kwomtari
Verb suffixes (1pl, 2pl, 3pl)	-nɔ, -mɛ, -no	-ɾe, -mo, -ɾe*
dog	map	mau
ear	mətɛnu	futɛne
crocodile	mɔməni	maməle
small	tɔkəno	tɔkweɾo
nose	apədu	tipu**

* Compare Biaka -ɾo, -mo, -na.

** Metathesis of /p/ and /t/.

=== Usher (2020) ===
Usher further classifies Yale (Nagatman) with Guriaso, and adds Busa, all under the name "Senu River".

Senu River (Kwomtari–Busa)

- Kwomtari–Nai
- Guriaso–Yale
- Odiai (Busa)

=== Confusion from Laycock ===
There has been confusion over the membership of the Kwomtari family, apparently due to a misalignment in the publication (Loving & Bass 1964) of the data used for the initial classification. (See Baron 1983.) Because of this, Laycock classified the Kwomtari languages as part of a spurious Kwomtari–Fas family, which confusingly was also often called "Kwomtari" in the literature. However, Baron sees no evidence that the similarities are due to relationship. Usher likewise discounts the inclusion of the Fas languages. See Kwomtari–Fas languages for details.
