= Kepi, Indonesia =

Kepi
- Town
- Location in Western New Guinea and Indonesia Kepi (Indonesia)
- Coordinates: 6°32′S 139°19′E
- Country: Indonesia
- Province: South Papua
- Regency: Mappi Regency
- Founded: 1946

Government
  - Mayor: Kristosimus Agawemu
  - Vice Mayor: ?

Area
  - Total: 13.6 km^{2} (5.3 sq mi)

Population (2020 Census)
  - Total: 8,394
  - Density: 617/km^{2} (1,600/sq mi)

Languages
  - Main languages: Indonesian, Papuan Malay, Awyu, Yaqay, Kayagar
- Time zone: UTC+9 (IEST)
- Area code: (+62) 832
- Climate: Af
- Website: kepi.go.id

Kepi is a town in Mappi Regency, South Papua, Indonesia. Following the formation of Mappi Regency in 2002, the town became its administrative seat.

== History ==
At the time of the Dutch arrival, the region was inhabited by various tribes speaking Trans–New Guinea languages, such as the Awyu, the Yaqay, or the Kayagar. The inhabitant of the area were mostly left alone by the outside world until the first half of the 20th century, when the Dutch started taking an interest in the region. In 1926, a penitential colony for political prisoners was established further inland at Tanahmerah, although it would take ten more years for the first Dutch government post to be established in the Mappi area. In 1936 a military post known as Mappi Post was set up on a hill named Tamao, at the confluence of the Digoel and Kawarga River, to prevent Headhunting raids which were creating unrest and migrations, and assert Dutch control over the area. Following the Japanese invasion of New Guinea in 1942 and the subsequent bombing of the post by Japanese aircraft in 1943, the post was essentially abandoned and only occupied by a coastwatcher. In 1944, the Australian Army moved in, installing a radar station which had been previously operating in Bupul, with the goal of spotting Japanese airplanes coming from the west to attack Merauke. However, as the Japanese airfields were wiped out by allied aerial bombardments, the radar station became useless and the Australian Army departed in 1945.

Shortly after the war in 1946, the administrative center of the Mappi district was moved from the Mappi Post to the village of Kepi, a Protestant mission with a church was established there, and catholic religious orders soon followed, such as the Daughters of Our Lady of the Sacred Heart or Our Lady of the Seven Dolours in 1948. The Dutch were also successful in eradicating the Headhunting raids in the area, the last one occurring in 1949. The brothers of Our Lady of the Seven Dolours introduced a regional project with an agricultural centre in Mappi. This Welfare Plan Mappi and the Regional Plan, which encouraged the cultivation of cocoa and rubber, were joint ventures of the mission and the Dutch government. The Christian missionaries carried on their work after the withdrawal of the Dutch from the area in 1962, and the subsequent transfer of Western New Guinea to Indonesia.

in 2002, following the separation of Mappi Regency from the Merauke Regency, the town became its administrative seat.

== Geography ==
Kepi is located along the Obaa river, and is surrounded by swamps. During the rainy monsoon, the rivers in the region regularly overflow their banks and often flood large areas for several months.

== Climate ==
Kepi has a tropical rainforest climate (Köppen Af) with heavy rainfall year-round.

Climate data for Kepi
Month	Jan	Feb	Mar	Apr	May	Jun	Jul	Aug	Sep	Oct	Nov	Dec	Year
Mean daily maximum °C (°F)	31.6 (88.9)	31.5 (88.7)	31.6 (88.9)	31.4 (88.5)	30.7 (87.3)	29.6 (85.3)	28.9 (84.0)	29.3 (84.7)	30.3 (86.5)	31.5 (88.7)	32.1 (89.8)	31.9 (89.4)	30.9 (87.6)
Daily mean °C (°F)	27.2 (81.0)	27.1 (80.8)	27.2 (81.0)	27.2 (81.0)	26.7 (80.1)	25.8 (78.4)	25.3 (77.5)	25.3 (77.5)	25.9 (78.6)	26.8 (80.2)	27.4 (81.3)	27.5 (81.5)	26.6 (79.9)
Mean daily minimum °C (°F)	22.9 (73.2)	22.8 (73.0)	22.9 (73.2)	23.0 (73.4)	22.8 (73.0)	22.1 (71.8)	21.7 (71.1)	21.4 (70.5)	21.6 (70.9)	22.1 (71.8)	22.7 (72.9)	23.2 (73.8)	22.4 (72.4)
Average rainfall mm (inches)	313 (12.3)	312 (12.3)	372 (14.6)	337 (13.3)	312 (12.3)	211 (8.3)	216 (8.5)	201 (7.9)	217 (8.5)	233 (9.2)	268 (10.6)	305 (12.0)	3,297 (129.8)
Source: Climate-Data.org

== Demographics ==
At the 2020 Census the population was 8,394, according to the Indonesian Government Badan Pusat Statistik (2021).

== Transport ==
Kepi is served by regular flights from Merauke and Mimika through the nearby Kepi Airport. The town can also be reached by boats going up the Oba river, itself connected to the Digul and the Odamun rivers through the Mappi river.
