= Isyaman =

- Village
- Location in Western New Guinea and Indonesia Isyaman (Indonesia)
- Coordinates: 7°06′42″S 139°23′46″E
- Country: Indonesia
- Province: South Papua
- Regency: Mappi Regency

Area
  - Total: 2,896 km^{2} (1,118 sq mi)

Population (2018 est.)
  - Total: 429
  - Density: 1,481/km^{2} (3,840/sq mi)
- Time zone: UTC+9 (WIB)
- Climate: Af

Isyaman is an inland village in Mappi Regency, South Papua, Indonesia.

== History ==
At the time of the Dutch arrival, the Mappi region was inhabited by various tribes speaking Trans–New Guinea languages, such as the Awyu, the Yaqay, or the Kayagar. The inhabitant of the area were mostly left alone by the outside world until the first half of the 20th century, when the Dutch started taking an interest in the region. In 1936, a military post known as Mappi Post, was set up on a hill named Tamao at the confluence of the Digoel and Kawarga River near where the village stands today, in order to prevent Headhunting raids which were creating unrest and migrations, and assert Dutch control over the area. Following the Japanese invasion of New Guinea in 1942, and the subsequent low-level bombing of the post by Japanese aircraft, the Dutch fled into the nearby jungle, leaving the post only occupied by a coastwatcher. In June 1944, the Australian Army moved in, installing a radar station which had been previously operating in Bupul, and renamed it Post 5, under the command of an infantry sergeant. The goal was to spot Japanese airplanes coming from the Aru islands or the Vogelkop to attack Merauke. However, as the Japanese airfields were rendered inoperable by allied aerial bombardments, the radar station was removed and the Australian Army departed in January 1945. After the war, Kepi replaced Mappi as the administrative center of the region. The post remained in use as a Dutch military outpost into the 1950s, after which it was abandoned when Western New Guinea was transferred to Indonesia in 1963.

== Climate ==
Isyaman has a tropical rainforest climate (Af) with heavy rainfall year-round.

Climate data for Isyaman
| Month | Jan | Feb | Mar | Apr | May | Jun | Jul | Aug | Sep | Oct | Nov | Dec | Year |
|---|---|---|---|---|---|---|---|---|---|---|---|---|---|
| Mean daily maximum °C (°F) | 31.4 (88.5) | 31.3 (88.3) | 31.4 (88.5) | 31.2 (88.2) | 30.6 (87.1) | 29.6 (85.3) | 28.8 (83.8) | 29.2 (84.6) | 30.4 (86.7) | 31.4 (88.5) | 32.1 (89.8) | 31.9 (89.4) | 30.8 (87.4) |
| Daily mean °C (°F) | 27.1 (80.8) | 27.1 (80.8) | 27.2 (81.0) | 27.0 (80.6) | 26.6 (79.9) | 25.8 (78.4) | 25.1 (77.2) | 25.1 (77.2) | 25.9 (78.6) | 26.7 (80.1) | 27.4 (81.3) | 27.5 (81.5) | 26.5 (79.8) |
| Mean daily minimum °C (°F) | 22.9 (73.2) | 22.9 (73.2) | 23.0 (73.4) | 22.9 (73.2) | 22.7 (72.9) | 22.0 (71.6) | 21.5 (70.7) | 21.1 (70.0) | 21.4 (70.5) | 22.0 (71.6) | 22.7 (72.9) | 23.2 (73.8) | 22.4 (72.3) |
| Average rainfall mm (inches) | 303 (11.9) | 281 (11.1) | 332 (13.1) | 280 (11.0) | 241 (9.5) | 146 (5.7) | 143 (5.6) | 112 (4.4) | 125 (4.9) | 162 (6.4) | 225 (8.9) | 278 (10.9) | 2,628 (103.4) |
Source: Climate-Data.org
