= List of incumbent regional heads and deputy regional heads in South Papua =

The following is an article about the list of Regional Heads and Deputy Regional Heads in 4 regencies/cities in South Papua who are currently still serving.

== List ==
Regency/ City	Photo of the Regent/ Mayor	Regent/ Mayor	Photo of Deputy Regent/ Mayor	Deputy Regent/ Mayor	Taking Office	End of Office (Planned)	Ref.
Asmat; Regency List of Regents/Deputy Regents		Thomas Eppe Safanpo		Yoel Manggaprou	20 February 2025	20 February 2030	
Boven Digoel; Regency List of Regents/Deputy Regents		Roni Omba		Marlinus	16 October 2025	16 October 2030	
Mappi; Regency List of Regents/Deputy Regents		Kristosimus Yohanes Agawemu		Sanusi	20 February 2025	20 February 2030	
Merauke; Regency List of Regents/Deputy Regents		Yoseph Bladib Gebze		Fauzun Nihayah	20 February 2025	20 February 2030	

Notes

- "Commencement of office" is the inauguration date at the beginning or during the current term of office. For acting regents/mayors, it is the date of appointment or extension as acting regent/mayor.
- Based on the Constitutional Court decision Number 27/PUU-XXII/2024, the Governor and Deputy Governor, Regent and Deputy Regent, and Mayor and Deputy Mayor elected in 2020 shall serve until the inauguration of the Governor and Deputy Governor, Regent and Deputy Regent, and Mayor and Deputy Mayor elected in the 2024 national simultaneous elections as long as the term of office does not exceed 5 (five) years.

== See also ==
- South Papua
