= Korowai =

Korowai may refer to:

- Korowai people
- Korowai language
- Korowai gecko
- Korowai (cloak), a type of traditional Māori cloak
