= Bupul =

- Village
- Location in Western New Guinea and Indonesia Bupul (Indonesia)
- Coordinates: 7°33′S 140°51′E
- Country: Indonesia
- Province: South Papua
- Regency: Merauke Regency

Area
  - Total: 94,956 km^{2} (36,663 sq mi)

Population (2018 est.)
  - Total: 561
  - Density: 59/km^{2} (150/sq mi)
- Time zone: UTC+9 (WIB)
- Climate: Af

Bupul (Dutch: Boepel) is an inland village in Merauke Regency, South Papua, Indonesia.

== History ==
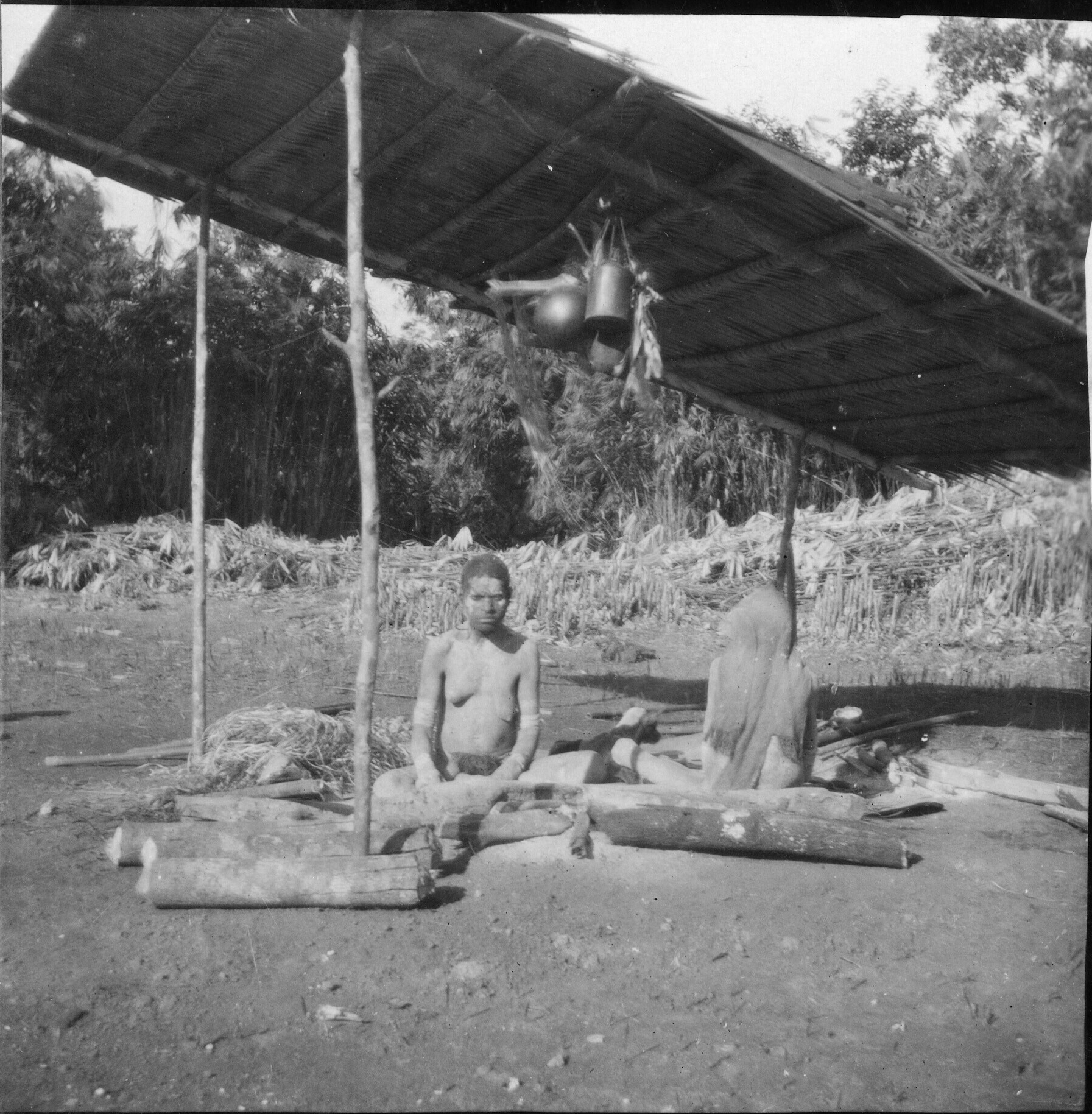
A grieving Yei Papuan woman on a grave in Bupul in the 1920s

At the time of the Dutch arrival in the first half of the 20th century, the region was inhabited by the Yei people. In July 1943, a radar station was established there by the Australian Army to spot Japanese airplanes coming from the north to bomb Merauke. When the main Japanese bases on the northern coast of New Guinea at Madang and Aitape/Wewak were either captured or neutralised, the sector covered by the station became less relevant. In May 1944, the radar was moved west to Mapi, at the confluence of the Digoel and Kawarga River.

Oil palm plantations were established around the village by Indonesian planters in 2013, leading to a conflict with the local Yei people over the future of the surrounding forest.
