= Mappi =

Mappi may refer to the following topics from South Papua, Indonesia:

- Mappi Regency
- Mappi River
