= Van Arsdale =

Van Arsdale is a surname. Notable people with the surname include:

- Billy Van Arsdale, a fictional character in the novel The Godfather Returns
- Corbin Van Arsdale (born 1969), member of the Texas House of Representatives from Harris County, 2003–2008; since a lawyer and lobbyist in Austin, Texas
- Dick Van Arsdale (1943–2024), American professional basketball player and coach
- Harry Van Arsdale, Jr. (1905–1986), organized labor leader
- John Van Arsdale (1756–1836), American Revolutionary War soldier
- John C. Van Arsdale (1919–1997), American aviator and businessman
- Mike van Arsdale (born 1965), American mixed martial artist
- Paul Van Arsdale (born 1920–2018), American musician
- Peternelle van Arsdale (born 1967), American writer
- Peter W. Van Arsdale, American academic
- Thomas Van Arsdale (born 1924–2018), head of the New York City Central Labor Council
- Tom Van Arsdale (born 1943), American professional basketball player

== See also ==
- Lake Van Arsdale, reservoir in Mendocino County, California
