= Kepi (disambiguation) =

Kepi is a type of cap.

Kepi may also refer to:

== People ==
- Kepi Ghoulie, lead singer for the Groovie Ghoulies
- Bruno Kepi (born 1988), Albanian footballer
- Marko Kepi, Albanian American president of Albanian Roots
- Myrteza Kepi, Albanian hero honored on a 1969 Albanian postage stamp

== Places ==
- Kepi Bar, a mountain in both Albania and the Republic of Macedonia
- Kepi, Indonesia, the capital of Mappi Regency in the Papua province

== Other ==
- KEPI, an American Christian radio station licensed to Eagle Pass, Texas
- Képi Blanc (publication), official publication of the French Foreign Legion
- Le Képi, a 1943 novel by Colette
- KEPI, an alias for PPP1R14C, a human gene that encodes for protein phosphatase 1 regulatory subunit 14C
- Kharkov Engineering Pedagogics Institute (KEPI), former name of Ukrainian Engineering Pedagogics Academy
