= Sawi people =

Ethnic group in Indonesia

Sawi Sawuy
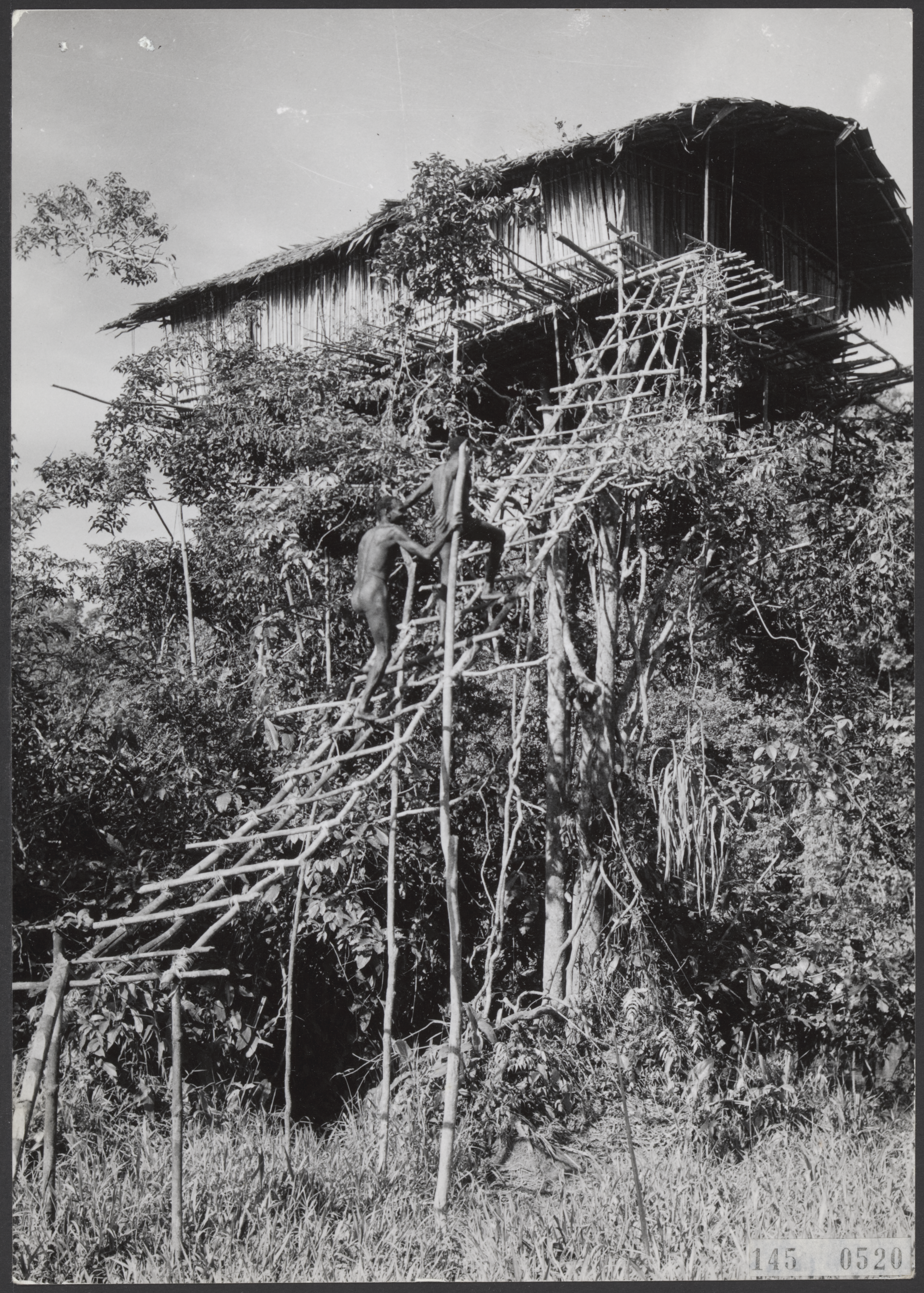
- Sawi's stilt house on the upper reaches of the Fajit River

Total population
- 4,800

Regions with significant populations
- Indonesia (South Papua)

Languages
- Sawi language, Indonesian language

Religion
- Christianity (predominantly), Animism

Related ethnic groups
- Awyu, Wambon, Kombai, Korowai

The Sawi or Sawuy are an ethnic group of South Papua, Indonesia. They were known to be cannibalistic headhunters as recently as the 1950s. They speak the Sawi language, which belongs to the Awyu language family.

Since then, many of Sawi have converted to Christianity and the world's largest circular building made strictly from un-milled poles was constructed in 1972 as a Christian meeting place by the Sawi. Christian missionary Don Richardson who lived among the Sawi wrote a book about the experience called Peace Child.

== See also ==
- Indigenous people of New Guinea
