= Komyandaret language =

Language in South Papua, Indonesia

Komyandaret
- Region: South Papua (Indonesia)
- Native speakers: (300 cited 2000)
- Language family: Trans–New Guinea: Greater Awyu; Becking–Dawi; Komyandaret–Tsaukambo; Komyandaret

Language codes
- ISO 639-3: kzv
- Glottolog: komy1238

Komyandaret is a poorly documented Papuan language in Boven Digoel, South Papua, Indonesia. It is spoken in Firiwage District, including Kaway Village, alongside Tsaukambo, with which it shares some mutual intelligibility.
