= Sawi language =

Sawi language may refer to:

- Sawi language (Papuan), a language of West Papua, Indonesia
- Sawi language (Dardic), an Indo-Aryan language of Afghanistan

== See also ==
- Shawi language, spoken in South America
