= KYT =

KYT may refer to:

- Kagoshima Yomiuri Television, a television station in Kagoshima Prefecture, Japan
- IATA airport code of Kyauktu Airport, Myanmar
- Kyt Selaidopoulos (born 1978), a former Canadian soccer player
- Kyt Jimenez, a Filipino basketball player
- Kayagar language, by ISO 639-3 language code
- Koyote, a South Korean co-ed vocal group
- WKYT-TV, Lexington, Kentucky, United States

== See also ==
- KYTV (TV)
