= Don Richardson (missionary) =

Canadian Christian missionary (1935–2018)

- Born: June 23, 1935; Charlottetown, Prince Edward Island, Canada
- Died: December 23, 2018 (aged 83)
- Occupation: Missionary

Don Richardson (June 23, 1935 – December 23, 2018) was a Canadian Christian missionary, teacher, author and international speaker who worked among people of Western New Guinea, Indonesia. He argued in his writings that, hidden among tribal cultures, there are usually some practices or understandings, which he calls "redemptive analogies", which can be used to illustrate the meaning of the Christian Gospel, contextualizing the biblical representation of the resurrection of Jesus.

== Missionary career ==
Richardson studied at the Prairie Bible Institute and the Summer Institute of Linguistics. In 1962, he and his wife, Carol, and their seven-month-old baby went to work among the Sawi tribe of what was then Dutch New Guinea in the service of the Regions Beyond Missionary Union. The Sawi were known to be cannibalistic headhunters. Living with them in virtual isolation from the modern world involved exposure to malaria, dysentery, and hepatitis, as well as the threat of violence.

In their new home in the jungle, the Richardsons set about learning the native Sawi language which was daunting in its complexity. There are 19 tenses for every verb. Don was soon able to become proficient in the dialect after a schedule of 8–10 hour daily learning sessions.

Richardson labored to show the villagers a way that they could comprehend Jesus from the Bible, but the cultural barriers to understanding and accepting this teaching seemed impossible until an unlikely event brought the concept of the substitutionary atonement of Christ into immediate relevance for the Sawi.

Missionary historian Ruth A. Tucker writes:

As he learned the language and lived with the people, he became more aware of the gulf that separated his Christian worldview from the worldview of the Sawi: "In their eyes, Judas, not Jesus, was the hero of the Gospels, Jesus was just the dupe to be laughed at." Eventually Richardson discovered what he referred to as a Redemptive Analogy that pointed to the Incarnate Christ far more clearly than any biblical passage alone could have done. What he discovered was the Sawi concept of the Peace Child.

Three tribal villages were in constant battle at this time. The Richardsons were considering leaving the area, so to keep them there, the Sawi people in the embattled villages came together and decided that they would make peace with their hated enemies. Ceremonies commenced in which young children were exchanged between opposing villages. One man in particular ran toward his enemy's camp and literally gave his son to his hated foe. Observing this, Richardson wrote: "if a man would actually give his own son to his enemies, that man could be trusted!"

Following this event many villagers converted to Christianity, a translation of the New Testament in Sawi was published, and thousands of patients from among the Sawi and neighboring tribes were treated by Carol. The world's largest circular building made strictly from un-milled poles was constructed in 1972 as a Christian meeting place by the Sawi.

The Richardsons then left the Sawi to be cared for by their own church elders and another missionary couple, while they went on to work on the analysis of the Auyu language.

In 1977 Don and his wife returned to North America, where he became a "minister-at-large" for his mission (now called World Team). Don also began teaching at the U.S. Center for World Mission in Pasadena, becoming Director of Tribal Peoples' Studies. He was instrumental in launching the Perspectives on the World Christian movement course under the auspices of USCWM. Richardson continued to teach and travel broadly, speaking about "redemptive analogies" as a means to communicate the gospel message among tribal peoples and other cultures. His best-selling books have had a significant impact on missiology and ongoing Christian missionary work.

== Works ==
- Peace Child (1972)
- Peace Child (1975) ISBN 0-8307-0415-9
- Peace Child (2007) ISBN 1-57658-289-2
- Lords of the Earth (2003) ISBN 1-57658-290-6
- Eternity in Their Hearts: Startling Evidence of Belief in the One True God in Hundreds of Cultures Throughout the World (1981) ISBN 0-8307-3837-1
- Secrets of the Koran (2008) ISBN 0-8307-3123-7
- Unhidden (2009) ISBN 1-6079-1245-7
- Heaven Wins (2013) ISBN 0-7642-1559-0
- A Man From Another World (2016) ISBN 978-1-941733-74-5
- O Fator Melquisedeque: O testemunho de Deus nas culturas por todo o mundo (2002) ISBN 85-275-0081-7
