= North Awyu =

Papuan language of Papua, Indonesia

- Region: Papua, Indonesia
- Native speakers: (1,500 cited 1987)
- Language family: Trans–New Guinea: Greater Awyu; Awyu–Dumut; Awyu; North Awyu

Language codes
- ISO 639-3: yir
- Glottolog: nort2918

North Awyu is a Papuan language of Papua, Indonesia. Its exact position within the Awyu languages is unclear due to lack of data.
