= Kia language =

Kia may be:

- the Zabana language of the Solomon Islands
- the Jair language of New Guinea, from the name of a language survey
