= Baidub =

- Location in South Papua Location in Indonesian Papua Location in Indonesia
- Coordinates: 6°45′20.2752″S 140°49′24.6108″E
- Country: Indonesia
- Province: South Papua
- Regency: Merauke Regency
- District: Ulilin District
- Elevation: 194 ft (59 m)

Population (2010)
  - Total: 223
- Time zone: UTC+9 (Indonesia Eastern Standard Time)

Baidub is a village in Ulilin district, Merauke Regency in South Papua province, Indonesia. Its population is 223.

== Climate ==
Baidub has a tropical rainforest climate (Af) with heavy to very heavy rainfall year-round.

Climate data for Baidub
Month	Jan	Feb	Mar	Apr	May	Jun	Jul	Aug	Sep	Oct	Nov	Dec	Year
Mean daily maximum °C (°F)	31.5 (88.7)	31.4 (88.5)	31.4 (88.5)	31.1 (88.0)	30.5 (86.9)	29.6 (85.3)	28.7 (83.7)	29.2 (84.6)	30.2 (86.4)	31.3 (88.3)	32.2 (90.0)	31.8 (89.2)	30.7 (87.3)
Daily mean °C (°F)	27.0 (80.6)	26.9 (80.4)	26.9 (80.4)	26.8 (80.2)	26.5 (79.7)	25.8 (78.4)	25.1 (77.2)	25.2 (77.4)	25.8 (78.4)	26.5 (79.7)	27.2 (81.0)	27.2 (81.0)	26.4 (79.5)
Mean daily minimum °C (°F)	22.5 (72.5)	22.5 (72.5)	22.5 (72.5)	22.6 (72.7)	22.6 (72.7)	22.0 (71.6)	21.5 (70.7)	21.3 (70.3)	21.4 (70.5)	21.7 (71.1)	22.2 (72.0)	22.7 (72.9)	22.1 (71.8)
Average precipitation mm (inches)	348 (13.7)	319 (12.6)	408 (16.1)	353 (13.9)	270 (10.6)	198 (7.8)	182 (7.2)	158 (6.2)	194 (7.6)	230 (9.1)	278 (10.9)	354 (13.9)	3,292 (129.6)
Source: Climate-Data.org
