= Erambu =

- Location in Western New Guinea and Indonesia Erambu (Indonesia)
- Coordinates: 8°0′53.3664″S 140°59′49.0092″E
- Country: Indonesia
- Province: South Papua
- Regency: Merauke Regency
- District: Sota District
- Elevation: 154 ft (47 m)

Population (2010)
  - Total: 474
- Time zone: UTC+9 (Indonesia Eastern Standard Time)

Erambu is a village in Sota district, Merauke Regency in South Papua province, Indonesia. Its population is 474.

== Climate ==
Erambu has a tropical monsoon climate (Am) with moderate rainfall from June to October and heavy rainfall from November to May.

Climate data for Erambu
Month	Jan	Feb	Mar	Apr	May	Jun	Jul	Aug	Sep	Oct	Nov	Dec	Year
Mean daily maximum °C (°F)	31.1 (88.0)	31.1 (88.0)	31.0 (87.8)	31.0 (87.8)	30.4 (86.7)	29.4 (84.9)	28.5 (83.3)	29.0 (84.2)	30.2 (86.4)	31.2 (88.2)	32.0 (89.6)	31.8 (89.2)	30.6 (87.0)
Daily mean °C (°F)	26.8 (80.2)	26.9 (80.4)	26.9 (80.4)	26.9 (80.4)	26.5 (79.7)	25.6 (78.1)	24.8 (76.6)	24.9 (76.8)	25.6 (78.1)	26.4 (79.5)	27.0 (80.6)	27.3 (81.1)	26.3 (79.3)
Mean daily minimum °C (°F)	22.6 (72.7)	22.7 (72.9)	22.8 (73.0)	22.8 (73.0)	22.6 (72.7)	21.8 (71.2)	21.2 (70.2)	20.9 (69.6)	21.1 (70.0)	21.7 (71.1)	22.1 (71.8)	22.8 (73.0)	22.1 (71.8)
Average precipitation mm (inches)	293 (11.5)	274 (10.8)	308 (12.1)	244 (9.6)	163 (6.4)	95 (3.7)	81 (3.2)	56 (2.2)	89 (3.5)	122 (4.8)	184 (7.2)	300 (11.8)	2,209 (86.8)
Source: Climate-Data.org
