= Kia Awyu =

Papuan language

- Jair
- Region: Papua, Indonesia
- Native speakers: 2,300 (2002)
- Language family: Trans–New Guinea: Greater Awyu; Awyu–Dumut; Awyu; Kia Awyu
- Dialects: Upper Jair; Lower Jair

Language codes
- ISO 639-3: awv
- Glottolog: jair1235

Kia River Awyu, or Jair (Djair), is a Papuan language of Papua, Indonesia, spoken along the Kia River. It is closely related to Edera River Awyu. Upper Kia River Awyu and Lower Kia River Awyu may be distinct languages, depending on one's criteria.
