= Tamagario language =

Papuan language spoken in Indonesia

Tamagario
- Tamario
- Native to: Indonesia
- Region: South Papua
- Native speakers: (3,500 cited 1987)
- Language family: Trans–New Guinea: Kayagar; Tamagario

Language codes
- ISO 639-3: tcg
- Glottolog: tama1336

Tamagario is a Papuan language of Mappi Regency, South Papua, Indonesia. It is spoken in:

- Haju District: Arare, Kerke, Pagai Villages
- Mambioman Bapai District: Tereyemu, Magabag Villages

Yogo is considered a dialect of Tamagario but may be a distinct language.
