= AWY =

AWY or awy may refer to:

- Edera Awyu language, ISO 639-3 code, awy
- Aluva railway station, Kerala, India, station code
