= Atohwaim language =

Papuan language of South Papua

Atohwaim
- Amathamit, Athokhin, Kaugat, Yagamit
- Native to: Indonesia
- Region: South Papua
- Native speakers: (1,000 cited 1987)
- Language family: Trans–New Guinea: Kayagar; Atohwaim

Language codes
- ISO 639-3: aqm
- Glottolog: atoh1238

Atohwaim (Amathamit, Athokhin, Kaugat, Yagamit) is a Papuan language spoken in Pantai Kasuari District, Asmat Regency, South Papua, Indonesia.
