= Awyu languages =

Awyu–Ok language cluster of New Guinea

Awyu
- Geographic distribution: Digul watershed, New Guinea
- Linguistic classification: Trans–New Guinea: Central West New Guinea; Awyu–Ok; Digul River (Greater Awyu); Awyu

Language codes
- ISO 639-3: –
- Glottolog: awyu1264

The Awyu languages are a cluster of Papuan languages in Indonesian New Guinea.

They number between five (bold below) and eleven, depending on one's criteria for a 'language':

- South Awyu
  - Bamgi River Awyu (Oser, Jénimu/Yenimu)
  - Ia River Awyu (Sjìagha/Shiaxa)
- Southeast Awyu (Jair)
  - Edera River Awyu
  - Lower Kia River Awyu
  - Upper Kia River Awyu
- Central and West Awyu
  - North Awyu
  - Central Awyu
    - Mappi River Awyu (Aghu)
    - Pasue River Awyu
  - West Awyu
    - Wildeman River Awyu (Pisà)
    - Asue River Awyu
      - Miaro River Awyu
      - Kewet River Awyu

(The placement and diversity of North Awyu is uncertain, due to lack of data.)
