= Aghu language =

Awyu language spoken in Papua, Indonesia

Aghu
- Central Awyu
- Region: South Papua, Indonesia
- Native speakers: (<14,000 cited 1987–2002)
- Language family: Trans–New Guinea: Greater Awyu; Awyu–Dumut; Awyu; Aghu
- Dialects: Aghu; Nohon

Language codes
- ISO 639-3: Either: ahh – Aghu awu – Central Awyu
- Glottolog: mapp1234

Aghu, or Central Awyu, is a Papuan language of South Papua, Indonesia. It may actually be two languages, depending on one's criteria for a 'language'. The two varieties are: Mappi River Awyu (Aghu) and Pasue River Awyu (Nohon, Mitak).

== Phonology ==
The phonology of the Aghu language:

Consonants
		Labial	Alveolar	Palatal	Velar
Nasal		m	n		
Plosive	voiceless	p	t		k
Plosive	voiced	b	d~ɾ		ɡ
Fricative		f	s~ʃ		x
Approximant		w		j	

Vowels
	Front		Central	Back
Close	i iː	y yː		u uː
Mid	ɛ ɛː			ɔ ɔː
Open			a aː	

The front rounded vowel /y/ is unusual among local languages in Indonesia, but it can also be found in few others such as Ulumanda’. At the ends of words, vowels may appear both long and nasalized. This occurs historically where there was a final nasal /m/ or /n/. Within words, rather than nasal vowels there are sequences of vowel plus nasal consonant which matches the articulation of the following consonant. Thus nasal vowels may be analyzed as /Vn/ or /VN/.
