= Kayagar languages =

Trans–New Guinea language group of Indonesia

Kayagar
- Cook River
- Geographic distribution: South Papua
- Linguistic classification: Trans–New Guinea: Kayagar–Kolopom; Kayagar

Language codes
- Glottolog: kaya1327
- Map: The Kayagar languages of New Guinea The Kayagar languages Other Trans–New Guinea languages Other Papuan languages Austronesian languages Uninhabited

The Kayagar languages are a small family of four closely related Trans–New Guinea languages spoken around the Cook River in Province of South Papua, Indonesia:

- Atohwaim (Kaugat)
- Gondu River
  - Kayagar (Kaygir)
  - Tamagario (Arare–Pagai)
    - Yogo ('Tamagario')

== Proto-language ==
=== Pronouns ===
Usher (2020) reconstructs the pronouns as:

	Gondu River		Atohwaim	
	sg	pl	sg	pl
1	*nax	*nep	naxa	nipi, neβi
2	*ax	*akan	axa	aʔani
3	*ek	*wep	–	–

=== Basic vocabulary ===
Some lexical reconstructions by Usher (2020) are:

gloss	Proto-Gondu River
head	*toxom
hair	*upm
ear	*itipaːm
eye	*sakam
nose	*jup
tooth	*o[x/ɣ]om
tongue	*maetap
foot/leg	*apit
blood	*jes
bone	*nomop
skin/bark	*pip
breast	*etum
louse	*num
dog	*epe
pig	*wakum
bird	*suopam
egg	*map-jaxam
tree/wood	*wom
man/person	*jo[k]
woman	*enop
sun	*taːm
moon	*xa[x/ɣ]atam
water	*o[x/ɣ]om
fire	*atu
stone	*maitn
path	*kamein
name	*na[k]
eat	*xapti
one	*pa[x/ɣ]amo[x/k]
two	*tousiki

== Vocabulary comparison ==
The following basic vocabulary words are from McElhanon & Voorhoeve (1970) and Voorhoeve (1971, 1975), as cited in the Trans-New Guinea database.

The words cited constitute translation equivalents, whether they are cognate (e.g. tikem, toxom for “head”) or not (e.g. icoxop, iripam for “ear”).

gloss	Atohwaim	Kayagar	Tamagario
head	tikem	toxom	tokom
hair	upm	owpm	upm
ear	icoxop	iripam	ipiram
eye	saam	saxam	sakam
nose	opom	jup	jup
tooth	ukoxom	oxom	ukom
tongue	menaxaram	marap	marap
leg	apir	apir	apir
louse	numu	soːm	
dog	upoc	epere; epe(re)	epe
pig	wakum	wakum	wakum
bird	wakem	səpam	towpam
egg	mapiam	mapiaxam	mapiakam
blood	wis	jes; yes	jet; yet
bone	nömöp	namop; nəmop	nomop
skin	piep	pip	pip
breast	ötöm		erem
tree	wim	wom	wom
man	mapirie	jo; yo	jo; yo
woman	enepe	onop	onop
sun	teme	taam	taam
moon	kaʔaram	xaxaram	kakaram
water	oxom	oxom	okom
fire	acu	aru	aru
stone	iki	kakup	maitu
road, path	sepmop	xami	kame
eat	owp	xapri	kapri
one	papriaxap	paxamu	pakamok
two	coopm	tosigi	totigi
