= MIFEE =

Indonesian agricultural project in Papua

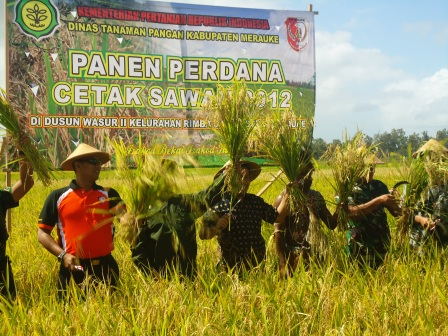
Harvesting of newly created paddy field in Merauke, South Papua in 2012/2013

Merauke Integrated Food and Energy Estate (MIFEE) is a government-supported project in Merauke Regency, South Papua, Indonesia to develop forested land for food cultivation and energy production.

It has been characterized as an "ecologically induced genocide" of the indigenous Malind Anim people, based on the concept of a "cultural genocide" focused more on the destruction of a culture than the loss of life, and the fact that core parts of Malind Anim culture are specific to the land on which they live, making them a "territorially bounded culture". Each of the 7 clans of Malind Anim traditionally owns certain land in Merauke: the Malind Anim, their land, and its animals have been described as "inextricably connected and indivisible".

== Description ==
The MIFEE project is expected to cover a 1.2 million hectare area, or a quarter of Merauke. In 2010, up to 90% of the area was still covered by natural forest. Valued at approximately $5 billion, the program aims to increase agricultural output. The project limits foreign investment in plantations to 49%. No amount of crops is reserved for local use. MIFEE involves intensive land clearing.

Indonesian agribusiness conglomerates invested in the project.

== Opposition ==
MIFEE led to a competition between the government and the Malind Anim over the land. Violence ensued. One report claimed that MIFEE involved a land grab.

Indigenous opposition to the project was substantial. Army units were dispatched to the MIFEE area. The number of migrants involved in the project will dwarf Merauke's indigenous population.

Opponents claimed that the project threatens conservation areas, such as virgin forests and water catchment areas, as well as the habitat of indigenous Papuans. There were substantial forest fires. Damage to the natural environment caused by the industrial activities of agribusinesses and palm oil plantations has severely affected the health and food security of these indigenous groups.

The UN Committee on the Elimination of Racial Discrimination called for a suspension of the project, absent free, informed consent by the indigenous population.
