= Edera Awyu =

Papuan language of Indonesia

- Region: Papua, Indonesia
- Native speakers: 13,000 including South Awyu (2002)
- Language family: Trans–New Guinea: Greater Awyu; Awyu–Dumut; Awyu; Edera Awyu

Language codes
- ISO 639-3: awy
- Glottolog: eder1237

Edera or Edera River Awyu is a Papuan language of Papua, Indonesia, spoken along the Edera River. It is closely related to Kia River Awyu.
