= Mandobo River =

River in South Papua, Indonesia

- Location in South Papua Location in Indonesia

Location
- Country: Indonesia
- Province: South Papua

Physical characteristics
- Source
  - location: Indonesia
- Mouth
  - coordinates: 6.35155°S 140.3322°E

The Mandobo River is a river in Western New Guinea, South Papua Province, Indonesia.

The Mandobo language is spoken in the Mandobo River watershed.

== See also ==
- List of drainage basins of Indonesia
- List of rivers of Western New Guinea
- Mandobo language
