= Pisa language =

Trans–New Guinea language spoken in Indonesia

Pisa
- Asuwe Awyu
- West Awyu
- Region: South Papua, Indonesia
- Native speakers: 6,500 (2002)
- Language family: Trans–New Guinea: Greater Awyu; Awyu–Dumut; Awyu; Pisa
- Dialects: Pisà; Asue; Miaro

Language codes
- ISO 639-3: psa
- Glottolog: asue1235

Pisa, also known as West Awyu and Asue Awyu, is an Awyu language of South Papua, Indonesia.

It may actually be three languages, depending on one's criteria for a 'language':

- West Awyu
  - Wildeman River Awyu (Pisà)
  - Asue River Awyu
    - Miaro River Awyu
    - Kewet River Awyu
