= Shiaxa language =

Papuan language of Indonesia

Shiaxa
- South Awyu
- Yenimu
- Region: Papua, Indonesia
- Native speakers: 13,000 including Edera (2002)
- Language family: Trans–New Guinea: Greater Awyu; Awyu–Dumut; Awyu; Shiaxa
- Dialects: Shiaxa; Yenimu

Language codes
- ISO 639-3: aws
- Glottolog: sout2941

Shiaxa (Sjiagha) and Yenimu (Jénimu, Oser), together known as South Awyu, are a Papuan language or languages of Papua, Indonesia. Whether they constitute one language or two depends on one's criteria for a 'language'. The two varieties are,

- Bamgi River Awyu (Oser, Yenimu/Jénimu)
- Ia River Awyu (Shiaxa/Sjìagha)

== Phonology ==
Consonants
		Labial	Alveolar	Dorsal
Nasal		m	n	
Plosive	voiceless	p	t	k
Plosive	voiced	b	d	ɡ
Fricative		f	s	x
Tap			ɾ	
Glide		w		j

- Word-initial voiced stops /b, d, ɡ/ may have prenasalized allophones [ᵐb, ⁿd, ᵑɡ] when the preceding word within a sentence ends in a vowel.
- /s/ may have an allophone of [ɕ] when preceding /i/, and may also have an affricate allophone [ts] in word-initial positions.
- /x/ may be voiced as [ɣ] in intervocalic positions.
- /n/ when in word-final position, may nasalize a preceding vowel [Ṽ].
- In the Yenimu dialect, /ɾ/ may also have lateral allophones as [l] or [ɺ].

Vowels
	Front	Central	Back
High	i		u
Mid	e		o
Low		a	
