= Wambon language =

Dumut language spoken in Indonesia

Wambon
- Native to: Indonesia
- Region: South Papua
- Native speakers: (3,900 cited 1987–2003)
- Language family: Trans–New Guinea: Greater Awyu; Awyu–Dumut; Dumut; Wambon
- Dialects: North (Digul, incl. Ketum); South (Yonggom)

Language codes
- ISO 639-3: Either: wms – Wambon ktt – Ketum
- Glottolog: ketu1239
- ELP: Ketum

Wambon is a Papuan language of Papua, Indonesia.
