= Korowai language =

Language in Papua

Korowai
- Kolufaup
- Region: Becking River, South Papua, Indonesia
- Ethnicity: Korowai
- Native speakers: 3,500 (2007)
- Language family: Trans-New Guinea: Asmat-Awyu-Ok; Greater Awyu; Becking-Dawi; Korowai

Language codes
- ISO 639-3: khe
- Glottolog: koro1312
- ELP: Korowai

Korowai (Kolufaup) is a Trans–New Guinea language spoken in South Papua, Indonesia. It is spoken by the Korowai people who live along the Becking River.

== Phonology ==
Consonants
	Labial	Alveolar	Palatal	Velar
Plosive	p b	t d	ɟ ⟨j⟩	k g
Prenasalized	ᵐb ⟨mb⟩	ⁿd ⟨nd⟩		ᵑg ⟨ngg⟩
Fricative	ɸ ⟨f⟩	s		x ⟨kh⟩
Nasal	m	n		
Approximant	w	l	j ⟨y⟩, ɥ ⟨hü⟩	

- /b/ and /d/ are in free variation with [ɓ] and [ɗ] respectively.
- /ɸ x/ can be voiced [β ɣ] intervocalically.

Vowels
	Front	Central	Back
High	i y ⟨ü⟩		u
Mid-high	e ⟨é⟩	(ə ⟨e⟩)	
Mid-low	ɛ ⟨è⟩		ɔ ⟨o⟩
Low		a	

- /e/ can be heard as [ɪ] in unstressed syllables.
- /a/ can vary to [æ] in stressed syllables.
- /ɔ/ is pronounced [o] before /w/.
- All vowels are lengthened in stressed syllables and word-finally.
- /ə/ is epenthetic and is never in stressed syllables.

Stress is unpredictable and phonemic.
