= Mandobo language =

Papuan language spoken in Indonesia

Mandobo
- Dumut
- Kaeti
- Native to: Indonesia
- Region: Boven Digoel Regency and Merauke Regency, South Papua
- Native speakers: 30,000 (2002)
- Language family: Trans–New Guinea: Greater Awyu; Awyu–Dumut; Dumut; Mandobo
- Dialects: Bawah; Atas; Kokenop

Language codes
- ISO 639-3: Either: bwp – Mandobo Bawah aax – Mandobo Atas
- Glottolog: mand1473

Mandobo, or Kaeti, is a Papuan language of Mandobo District in Boven Digoel Regency and Ulilin District in Merauke Regency, South Papua, Indonesia.

== Varieties ==
Ethnologue distinguishes two languages:

- Mandobo Bawah, spoken on the Lower Mandobo River
- Mandobo Atas, spoken on the Upper Mandobo River

However, according to its speaker Mandobo is divided to at least three languages and four dialects.

- Upper Mandobo (Mountain Wambon) [aax]
  - Kokenop/Kohonope
  - Agayop
- Central Mandobo (Coastal Wambon)
  - Ulugela/Lugerah/Iwammup/Kenerame
- Lower Mandobo (Lower Wambon) [bwp]
  - Tekamerop/Thegamonok

== Phonology ==
=== Vowels ===
	Front		Central	Back
Close	i	y		u
Mid	e			o
Open			a	

=== Consonants ===
		Labial	Alveolar	Dorsal
Plosive	voiceless	p	t	k
Plosive	prenasal	ᵐb	ⁿd	ᵑɡ
Nasal		m	n	
Rhotic			ɾ	
Approximant		w		j

== Evolution ==
Below are some Kaeti reflexes of proto-Trans-New Guinea proposed by Pawley (2012), drawn from McElhanon and Voorhoeve (1970).

proto-Trans-New Guinea	Kaeti
*maŋgat[a] ‘teeth, mouth’	magot
*mVkVm ‘cheek’	(a)moka (cf. Axu moxo pe)
*maŋgV ‘compact round object’	(Axu mügo ‘egg’)
*amu ‘breast’	am
*k(o,u)ma(n,ŋ)[V] ‘neck, nape’	koman
*kumV- ‘die’	kün (cf. Sawuy xom-, Wambon N. & Wambon S. kim-)
*mVkVm ‘cheek, jaw’	(a)moka ‘cheek’
*na ‘1SG’	nø(p)
*ni, *nu ‘1PL free pron.’	no-güp
*na- ‘eat’	(Wambon en-)
*k(o,u)ma(n,ŋ)[V] ‘neck, nape’	koman
*mb(i,u)t(i,u)C ‘fingernail’	betit
*imbi ‘name’	üp
*apa[pa]ta ‘butterfly’	apap
*k(a,o)ndok[V] ‘foot, leg’	kodok
*andu- ‘to cook’	odu
*mb(i,u)t(i,u)C ‘fingernail’	betit
*(ŋg,k)iti-maŋgV ‘eye’	(?) kerop
*(mb,p)ututu- ‘to fly’	(?) bere(na)
*kumut, *tumuk ‘thunder’	komöt
*maŋgat[a] ‘teeth, mouth’	magot
*ŋga ‘2SG’	gu
*maŋgat[a] ‘teeth, mouth’	magot
*maŋgV ‘compact round object’	(Axu mügo ‘egg’)
*ka(nd,t)(e,i)kV ‘ear’	kere(top)
*k(a,o)ndok[V] ‘foot, leg’	kodok
*ka(nd,t)apu ‘skin’	kotae
*kumbutu ‘wind’	kiow
*kin(i,u)- ‘sleep’	kinum
*kumV- ‘die’	kün
*k(o,u)ma(n,ŋ)[V] ‘neck’	koman
*kuya ‘cassowary’	(Sawuy kuye)
*kV(mb,p)(i,u)t(i,u) ‘head’	(?) xebia(an)
*mVkVm ‘cheek’	(a)moka (cf. Axu moxo pe)
*kutV(mb,p)(a,u)[C] ‘long’	(?) guru(op)
*ok[V] ‘water’	ok
*k(a,o)ndok[V] ‘foot’	kodok
