= Merauke =

Capital district of Merauke Regency

- Town (District)
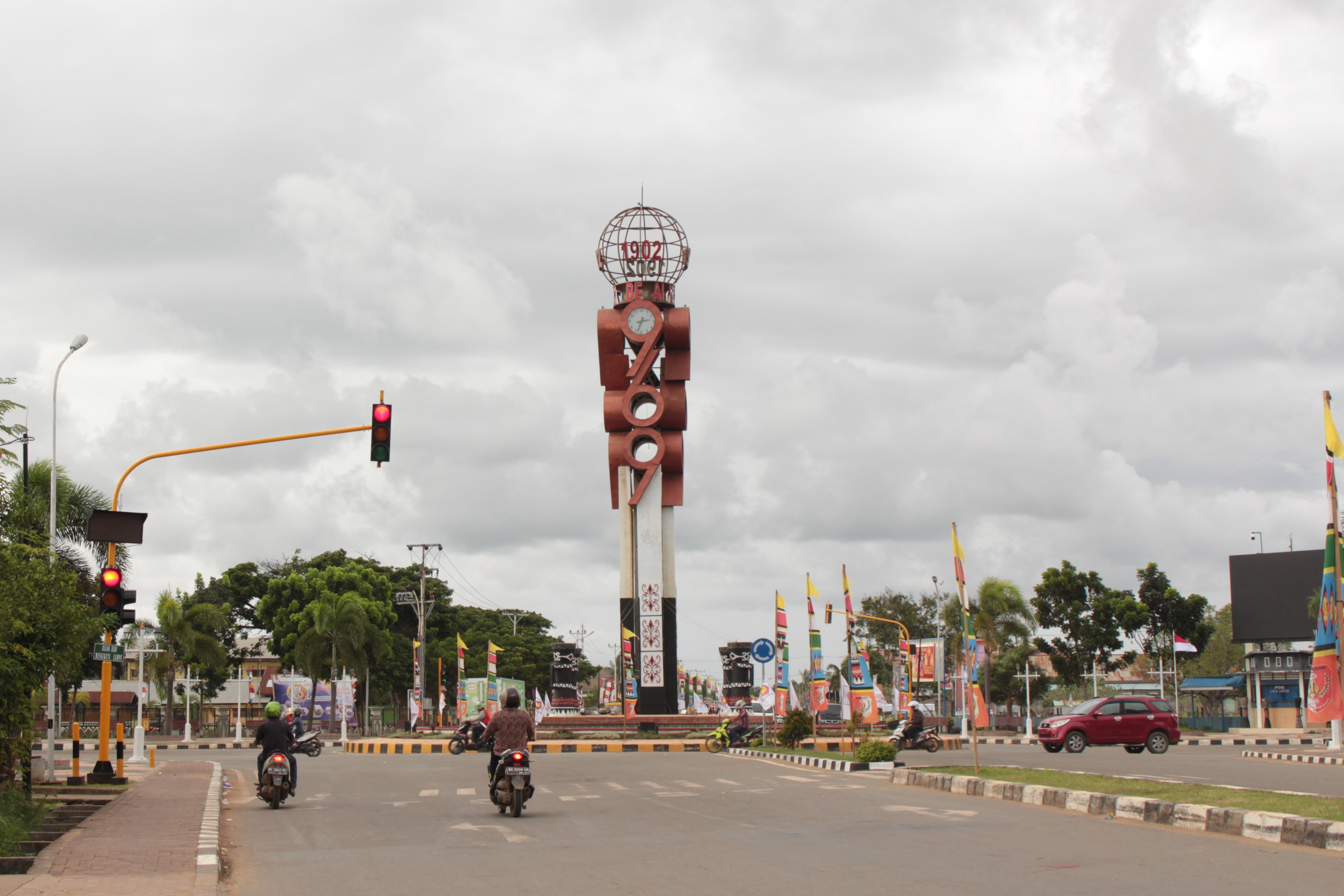
- Lingkaran Brawijaya (Libra) 969 monument in Merauke
- Interactive map of Merauke
- Location in Western New Guinea and Indonesia Merauke (Indonesia)
- Coordinates: 8°28′S 140°20′E
- Country: Indonesia
- Province: South Papua
- Regency: Merauke Regency

Government
  - Head of district: Kristian Ndiken

Area
  - Total: 500.41 km^{2} (193.21 sq mi)

Population (mid 2024 estimate)
  - Total: 116,864
  - Density: 233.54/km^{2} (604.86/sq mi)

Demographics
  - Languages: Auyu, Kolopom, Mandobo, Marind, Muyu, Mombum (natives) Javanese (dominant), and others
- Time zone: UTC+9 (Indonesia Eastern Time)
- Area code: (+62) 975
- Climate: Aw
- Website: http://www.merauke.go.id

Merauke is a large town (kelurahan) and an administrative district (distrik) in Merauke Regency of South Papua Province, Indonesia. It is also the administrative centre of Merauke Regency, and is considered to be the easternmost city in Indonesia, although it currently lacks city status. The town was originally called Ermasoe.

Merauke is next to the Maro River where the Port of Merauke is located. Merauke District covers a land area of 500.41 km^{2}, and had a population of 87,634 at the 2010 Census. which at the 2020 Census had increased to 102,351; the official estimate as at mid 2024 was 116,864 (comprising 60,068 males and 56,796 females).

== History ==
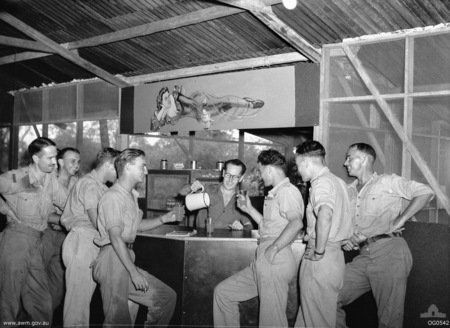
RAAF No. 12 Squadron pilots in the mess at Merauke in December 1943

Merauke was the capital of the Residency of South New Guinea. The population of Muyu people in the area started growing in the 1930s.

Merauke was the site of an Allied air and naval base, Naval Base Merauke, during World War II and there was ground fighting between Australian and Japanese patrols in the area.

The first Christian church in Merauke was completed in 1940, but it was destroyed in 1942.

On 11 December 1959, Australian ocean rower Michael 'Tarzan' Fomenko was washed ashore at Tomerau, near Merauke, in a dugout canoe which he had paddled from Queensland. He intended to continue a further 600 miles to Australian New Guinea, but Dutch authorities in Sydney advised that it would be "suicide" to allow Fomenko to leave the town.

The expression "Sabang to Merauke" is used as shorthand for the territorial extent of Indonesia from west to east, for instance in the name of Sabang Merauke Raya Air Charter. For instance, President Suharto stated in 1968 that "independence, sovereignty and territorial integrity from Sabang to Merauke are for the Indonesian people matters of principle".

== Communities ==
Merauke District is sub-divided into eleven urban kelurahan and 5 rural villages (desa, idebtified by asterisks in the table below)). These are listed below with their official codes (kode wilayah) and their populations as at mid 2023.

Kode Wilayah	Name of kelurahan or desa	Pop'n Estimate mid 2023	Post code
93.01.01.2001	Nasem *	572	99618
93.01.01.1002	Samkai	11,801	99615
93.01.01.1003	Karang Indah	9,828	99614
93.01.01.1004	Mandala	15,158	99617
93.01.01.1005	Maro	11,015	99613
93.01.01.1006	Kelapa Lima	12,038	99612
93.01.01.1007	Rimba Jaya	11,773	99610
93.01.01.2008	Wasur *	652	99611
93.01.01.1009	Bambu Pemali	7,788	99616
93.01.01.1010	Seringgu Jaya	8,055	99619
93.01.01.1011	Kamundu	6,996	99607
93.01.01.1012	Kamahedoga	3,043	99606
93.01.01.1013	Muli	8,640	99608
93.01.01.2014	Bokem *	464	99604
93.01.01.2015	Buti *	2,414	99605
93.01.01.2016	Nggolar *	304	99609
Totals	Merauke District	110,541	

Nasem, Wasur, Bokem and Nggolare villages (desa) are rural areas to the north and east of the urban area.

Merauke District is flanked to the west by Semangga District, which forms part of the metropolitan area of Merauke;
Semangga District is sub-divided into 10 rural villages (all rated as desa).

Kode Wilayah	Name of desa	Pop'n Estimate mid 2023	Post code
93.01.05.2001	Matara *	697	99631
93.01.05.2002	Waninggap Nanggo *	1,058	99631
93.01.05.2003	Urumb *	1,042	99631
93.01.05.2004	Sido Mulyo *	1,116	99631
93.01.05.2005	Kuprik *	1,618	99631
93.01.05.2006	Kuoer *	1,446	99631
93.01.05.2007	Semangga Jaya *	3,641	99631
93.01.05.2008	Marga Mulya *	2,882	99631
93.01.05.2009	Muram Sari *	1,480	99631
93.01.05.2010	Waninggap Kai *	1,838	99631
Totals	Semangga District	16,816	

== Climate ==
Merauke features a tropical savanna climate (Köppen: Aw)

Climate data for Merauke (2000–2020)
Month	Jan	Feb	Mar	Apr	May	Jun	Jul	Aug	Sep	Oct	Nov	Dec	Year
Record high °C (°F)	33.9 (93.0)	32.8 (91.0)	33.3 (91.9)	33.3 (91.9)	33.3 (91.9)	32.2 (90.0)	32.2 (90.0)	32.8 (91.0)	33.3 (91.9)	35.6 (96.1)	36.1 (97.0)	35.0 (95.0)	36.1 (97.0)
Mean daily maximum °C (°F)	31.4 (88.5)	31.3 (88.3)	31.1 (88.0)	31.2 (88.2)	30.6 (87.1)	29.5 (85.1)	28.9 (84.0)	29.3 (84.7)	30.5 (86.9)	31.5 (88.7)	32.2 (90.0)	32.3 (90.1)	30.8 (87.5)
Mean daily minimum °C (°F)	24.6 (76.3)	24.6 (76.3)	24.6 (76.3)	24.5 (76.1)	24.2 (75.6)	23.6 (74.5)	22.5 (72.5)	22.0 (71.6)	22.5 (72.5)	23.2 (73.8)	24.4 (75.9)	24.9 (76.8)	23.8 (74.9)
Record low °C (°F)	20.0 (68.0)	21.1 (70.0)	20.6 (69.1)	19.4 (66.9)	18.9 (66.0)	16.7 (62.1)	17.2 (63.0)	14.4 (57.9)	14.4 (57.9)	15.6 (60.1)	17.2 (63.0)	20.6 (69.1)	14.4 (57.9)
Average rainfall mm (inches)	279.0 (10.98)	278.0 (10.94)	329.2 (12.96)	230.4 (9.07)	170.3 (6.70)	58.7 (2.31)	35.4 (1.39)	66.3 (2.61)	21.6 (0.85)	53.0 (2.09)	96.5 (3.80)	165.5 (6.52)	1,783.9 (70.22)
Average rainy days	14.7	14.7	15.7	12.9	9.8	8.3	6.8	3.3	3.0	4.2	5.3	10.3	109
Average relative humidity (%)	84	85	84	84	84	82	81	81	80	81	82	83	83
Source 1: Meteomanz
Source 2: Deutscher Wetterdienst (extremes), Danish Meteorological Institute (humidity)

== See also ==
- Merauke Five
- Mopah Airport

== Works cited ==
- Kelly, Charlotte (1944). "Catholic Missions in New Guinea". Studies. 33 (132). Messenger Publications: 535–542. JSTOR 30100046.
- Schoorl, J. (1988). "Mobility and Migration in Muyu Culture". Bijdragen tot de Taal-, Land- en Volkenkunde. 144 (4). Brill Publishers: 540–556. JSTOR 27863984.
