= Sawi language (Papuan) =

Awyu language spoken in Indonesia

Sawi
- Native to: Indonesia
- Region: Papua
- Ethnicity: Sawi
- Native speakers: (3,500 cited 1993)
- Language family: Trans–New Guinea: Greater Awyu; Awyu–Dumut; (tentative); Sawi

Language codes
- ISO 639-3: saw
- Glottolog: sawi1257

Sawi or Sawuy is a language of the Sawi people of the Trans–New Guinea phylum spoken in sago swamps in the southwestern parts of the Indonesian province of Papua. Of the neighboring languages, it is most closely related to the Awyu languages to the east.

Sawi is an inflecting language and uses both inflections of the stem and suffixes to indicate person, number, and tense.

The Bible began to be translated in 1970 by Canadian missionary, Don Richardson. The New Testament was completed in 1994. It is available on YouVersion, and published by the Indonesian Bible Society. Work is ongoing to translate the Old Testament.
