= Merauke Five =

Australians detained in Indonesia

The Merauke Five are five Australian citizens who were detained by Indonesian authorities in the Papuan town of Merauke in 2008 for entering Indonesian territory without visas. The passengers were assured by the operator of the aircraft that visas were arranged and would be obtained upon arrival. Even without visas or security clearance, they were cleared to land by air traffic controllers, who were aware of their situation and assured them that a fine would be sufficient to clear the matter up. However, they were put in detention, then sentenced to jail.

The Merauke Five consisted of middle-aged Queenslanders – pilot William Scott-Bloxam, his wife Vera and passengers Keith Mortimer, Hubert Hofer and Karen Burke. The trip's intended purpose was part sightseeing and part business. Their arrival date was 12 September 2008.

== Appeal ==
After being sentenced to between two and three years' jail each, the group appealed the case in the Jayapura High Court, resulting in their freedom as the court overturned the jail sentence. When they arrived at the airport, however, they found their plane surrounded by Indonesian security, who had confiscated it on behalf of the prosecutors who lodged an appeal to overturn the High Court ruling. The plane, they said, was required for evidence. And as the court ruling stipulated they must leave in their own plane, the Merauke Five were trapped at Mopah airport — too afraid to leave in case they would be charged again for other charges.

Defence lawyer Mohammad Rifan told Australian Associated Press that under Indonesian law, the prosecutors were not permitted to appeal against a High Court decision. "Under the law of the Criminal Code, 'article 244', if the court orders the release as soon as possible, right now, you cannot appeal to the Supreme Court," he said. "If this happened for an Indonesian national, they would be free straight away. Why not for an Australian national?"

But an Indonesian law expert in Australia said that while it is true the country does not allow appeal of absolute acquittals, they do allow it in other cases – such as, for example, if someone is acquitted because they were found to be under duress. "The question is whether the Merauke Five's is an absolute acquittal for the purposes of Indonesian law", said Director of the Asian Law Centre at Melbourne University, Professor Tim Lindsey. "That will be a first issue that will be raised when the issue comes back before the courts."

Lindsey noted, however, that Indonesian courts have been "quite inconsistent in how they interpret article '244', and have tended to read it in a way that will allow the appeal to go ahead". He also said that in Australia, it is unusual for a prosecutor to appeal.

== Australian Government's response ==
Minister for Foreign Affairs, Stephen Smith, indicated that at that point, he would not put pressure on the Indonesian Government to release the five. "We have to go through and respect the Indonesian legal processes, and currently they are subject to an appeal to the Indonesian Supreme Court," he said. "Their status now is what is described as 'city detention'. So they effectively have what is described as a licence to the city, but we are giving them consular assistance."

Karen Burke, one of the five, pleaded with the Australian Government to do more to help. "We're scared to death to leave," she said. "We think if we put a foot out the front door we could be arrested on some other charges. Our position is quite precarious."

A Foreign Affairs spokesman in Australia said, "This situation is distressing for the Australians and their families, and the embassy in Jakarta is discussing with the five Australians and their lawyers the next steps towards obtaining their release and return. We understand that the five are no longer in detention, but are unable to depart for Australia. They are currently at the Immigration Office at Merauke Airport endeavouring to clarify their legal status. Our embassy consular official is also assisting them in consultation with the Indonesian authorities."

== Difficulties in returning to Australia ==
Their convictions were dismissed by Indonesia's Supreme Court on 10 June 2009 and they were ordered to return to Australia. But 12 days later, on 22 June 20, the group was still waiting for Indonesia's attorney-general's office to issue a final piece of paperwork. "As soon as it has been issued it will take only a short time for the immigration department to issue the final release order," said the group's lawyer, Mohammad Rifan.

But some people within the attorney-general's office still seemed "reluctant" to let the Australians leave, Rifan said.

On Wednesday, Merauke District Court officials received from Jakarta the paperwork that enabled them to return the five Australians' passports and let the pilot, William Scott-Bloxam, fire up his twin-engined aircraft. However, the group's lawyer, Mohammad Rifan, said he feared prosecutors may yet raise further hurdles. "They still have not lifted the ban that prevents them leaving. They say they have to ask the attorney-general's office for guidance to do this," said Rifan. "But it seems like there is an effort from prosecutors to hinder the process."

Rifan was right. As immigration officials strode towards the Australians' light plane to hand over their stamped passports, an aggrieved prosecutor, Yafeth Bonai, emerged on the tarmac and intervened. With local media present and the bemused Australians watching, Mr Bonai started shouting at the immigration officials, saying he had not seen the paperwork that cleared the Australians to leave. A heated argument lasting 20 minutes took place in front of the plane, with Mr Bonai not prepared to accept assurances by the Indonesian immigration department that a travel ban had been lifted after the country's highest court found the Australians innocent of immigration and aviation offences. "I need to see it in black and white," Mr Bonai shouted. Told to phone his superiors and check, he responded, "We can't phone our bosses and order them around."

The officials agreed to leave and reconvene at Mr Bonai's office. After phone calls were made to Jakarta, Mr Bonai finally conceded the travel ban had been rescinded.

== Safe arrival home ==
After their safe arrival home in late June 2009, the five, in front of news reporters, thanked all those who had a hand in their release, including the Australian Government. They avoided questions about the amount of help that had been provided by the Australian Government. When asked, Mr Mortimer replied with, "We have no complaints, they did a great job for us. I think they should have got themselves involved a lot earlier than they did but bottom line is they got there and we're out." They also made sure that they did not dump too heavily on the Indonesian authorities although they had strong suspicions that the case was driven by political motivation. "I don't know what was driving the Attorney-General's office, but it was certainly more than the fact that people didn't have visas or that the paperwork was not correct," Mr Scott-Bloxam said. "It's hard to imagine that you end up in the highest court in the land for a misdemeanour case," Mr Mortimer said.

Foreign Minister Stephen Smith was unavailable for an interview but the Department of Foreign Affairs issued an extensive statement welcoming the group home, but pointed out that before travelling, Australians needed to inform themselves about the laws of the countries they planned to visit. The statement also said that if people disobeyed foreign laws and ended up in court, the Government's ability to assist them would be very limited. The statement then stated that the Australian Government registered its strong interest in the case being handled expeditiously with the Indonesian Government.

After the Australians touched down in Horn Island, one of the five went back to work. Another worked on restoring his home – a boat on which he lived – to full order, and another took a break, too emotionally exhausted to think about working. William Scott-Bloxam, the main player in the five's detention, and wife Vera set about resurrecting their aviation business.
