= Tsaukambo language =

Language in South Papua, Indonesia

Tsaukambo
- Tsakwambo, Tsaukwambo, Saukambo
- Kotogüt
- Region: South Papua (Indonesia)
- Native speakers: (780 cited 2000)
- Language family: Trans–New Guinea: Greater Awyu; Becking–Dawi; Komyandaret–Tsaukambo; Tsaukambo

Language codes
- ISO 639-3: kvz
- Glottolog: tsak1250

Tsaukambo or Tsakwambo (Kotogüt) is one of the Greater Awyu languages spoken by inhabitants of Kampung Biwage, Kawagit District, Boven Digoel Regency in South Papua, Indonesia.
