= Peternelle van Arsdale =

American writer (born 1967)

- Born: September 10, 1967 (age 58); Belleville, New Jersey, U.S.
- Education: Bryn Mawr College (BA)
- Occupation: Writer

Peternelle van Arsdale (born September 10, 1967, in Belleville, New Jersey) is an American writer.

== Early life and education ==
Born in Newark, New Jersey, Van holds a BA from Bryn Mawr College.

== Career ==
Van Arsdale's first novel, The Beast Is an Animal, was published in 2017. A dark fairy tale written for young adults, it was described as "atmospheric and immersive" by Publishers Weekly. It is being developed by Amazon Studios for a feature film produced by Ridley Scott's Scott Free Productions and directed by Bert & Bertie.

Van Arsdale's second novel, The Cold Is in Her Bones, publishing in 2019, was written for a crossover audience of young adults and adults. It was inspired by the Medusa myth and was described by Publishers Weekly as "filled with strong characters who defy basic labels".

Van Arsdale's essays have been published by LitHub, Hypable.com, and Culturefly.
