= Kayagar language =

Trans–New Guinea language spoken in Indonesia

Kayagar
- Wiyagar, Kaigar
- Native to: Indonesia
- Region: South Papua
- Native speakers: (10,000 cited 1993)
- Language family: Trans–New Guinea: Kayagar; Kayagar

Language codes
- ISO 639-3: kyt
- Glottolog: kaya1328

Kayagar (Kajagar, Kaygi, Kaygir, Wiyagar) is a Papuan language spoken in South Papua. Wiyagar is spoken in Sigare Village, Kaitok Village and Yame Village in Assue District, Mappi Regency, While Kaigar is spoken in Amagais Village, Der Koumur District, Asmat Regency.
