= Peter W. Van Arsdale =

American academic

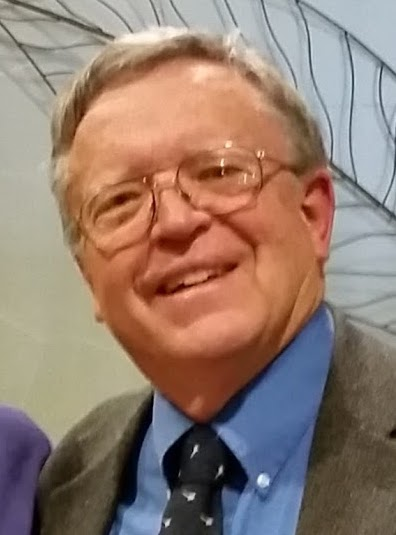
- Education: University of Colorado Boulder (Ph.D.), (B.A.) University of Maryland (M.A.)
- Known for: Humanitarianism
- Scientific career
- Fields: Human rights Applied anthropology International development
- Workplaces: Josef Korbel School of International Studies, University of Denver (retired)

Peter W. Van Arsdale is an American academic who retired as director of African Initiatives at the University of Denver, Josef Korbel School of International Studies, where he also served as Senior Lecturer. He previously served as a senior researcher for eCrossCulture Corporation, based in Colorado. An applied cultural anthropologist, he has worked in E. Africa, S.E. Asia, the Balkans, Latin America, the Caribbean, and North America, emphasizing community water resources, human rights, refugee resettlement, and humanitarian intervention. He is a noted author, journal editor, and former president of the National Association for the Practice of Anthropology and known analytically for his “tree of rights” and his “theory of obligation.” He is co-founder of The Denver Hospice, and co-discoverer in 1974 of a band of previously uncontacted Citak people in Indonesian New Guinea. Since 1979, he has been a fellow of The Explorers Club. He currently serves as Affiliate Faculty Member (pro bono) at Regis University. Since 2006, his book Forced to Flee has been a best-seller in the refugee field.

== Career ==
With a background in psychology, Van Arsdale earned his doctorate in applied and cultural anthropology from the University of Colorado - Boulder. His doctoral research was conducted in Irian Jaya (now Papua), Indonesia, in 1973/1974 on issues of socio-economic and socio-political change. His dissertation was published as a book in 1975. During that period of field work, he also co-led the Citak expedition.

On both a full- and part-time basis, he worked at the University of Denver through 2020. He served first in the Department of Anthropology (one year as chair), and from 1980 through 2020 at the Graduate School of International Studies (now Josef Korbel School of International Studies). There, he was co-developer of both the Program in Humanitarian Assistance and the Project Bosnia service learning program. Van Arsdale has twice served as Editor-in-Chief of the peer-reviewed journal The Applied Anthropologist. From 2008 to 2010 he was the chair of the Committee on Human Rights & Social Justice of the Society for Applied Anthropology.

Outside of academe, from 1986 through 1994 he served as program specialist for Refugee, Immigrant, and American Indian Issues at the Colorado Division of Mental Health; immediately thereafter, he served as head of Program Evaluation for the Colorado Mental Health Institute - Fort Logan. During this period, he was co-developer of the division’s refugee and immigrant program; co-developer of the World Federation for Mental Health’s national plan for collaborative refugee and immigrant resource centers; and co-developer of the National Association for the Practice of Anthropology/Society for Applied Anthropology’s national training guidelines for applied anthropologists.

In 1978, Van Arsdale co-founded the Hospice of Metro Denver (now The Denver Hospice), which has grown into the largest hospice in the Rocky Mountain region. He also co-founded the region’s first institution specializing in psychological, legal and social service care for asylum seekers and other refugees: the Rocky Mountain Survivors Center (which provided services to traumatized persons through 2009). He has served as an expert witness/analyst in cases involving Sudanese, Ethiopian and Bosnian asylum seekers, and, as a consultant on related human rights abuses. Independently, he co-founded the Axum (Ethiopia) - Denver (Colorado) Sister City Program.

He has worked in a number of countries worldwide: Indonesia, Timor-Leste, Sudan, South Sudan, Ethiopia, Kenya, Tanzania, Bosnia, Romania, Israel, Palestine, Peru, Chile, Guyana, El Salvador, Haiti and the United States. Often featuring refugee issues, his applied research and community outreach have engaged topics involving resource development, human rights, mental health, and humanitarianism. More recently, he has worked on humanitarian issues at the military-civilian interface. In 2016, through LTG Associates, he assisted in evaluating a human-centered design program for NASA. Several current projects, through Rotary International, involve East Africa. His most recent book (2022) is Encounters: 50 Fascinating Strangers from My Life on the Road.

== Awards ==
In 1995, Van Arsdale was recognized as the Outstanding Professor at what is now called the Josef Korbel School. In 2002, he was recipient of the Omer C. Stewart Memorial Award for contributions to applied anthropology. More recently (in 2013), he was elected to the Arvada West (Colorado) Hall of Fame and (through Rotary International, District 5450) in 2021 was recognized for work on water and sanitation systems. In 2008, Van Arsdale received the "Voice for the Voiceless" award for his work on behalf of refugees, and in 2017 he received the "Kujali" award for his work on behalf of hospice, in the U.S. and Tanzania. In 1965, as a high school senior, he set the Colorado record for the one mile run (4:25.1).

== Publications ==
- Encounters: 50 Fascinating Strangers from My Life on the Road (Amity Bridge Books, 2022).
- "Global Human Rights." In Mark Aldenderfer (ed.), Oxford Research Encyclopedia of Anthropology (Oxford University Press, 2019).
- Global Human Rights: People, Processes, and Principles (Waveland Press, 2017).
- Hazardous Field Operations: Romanian - American Joint Humanitarian Training, in: Robert Albro, George Marcus, Laura McNamara, and Monica Schoch-Spana (eds.), Anthropologists in the SecurityScape: Ethics, Practice, and Professional Identity (Left Coast Press, 2012).
- Humanitarians in Hostile Territory: Expeditionary Diplomacy and Aid outside the Green Zone (Left Coast Press, 2010, co-authored with Derrin R. Smith). Recipient of a CHOICE recognition award and recently ranked 37 on a list of 100 Best Books for Humanitarians. ISBN 9781598744446
- Forced to Flee: Human Rights and Human Wrongs in Refugee Homelands (Lexington, 2006). Recipient of a CHOICE recognition award. ISBN 9780739112342. An excerpt from this book on the Omarska Camp in Bosnia can be found online.
- Refugee Empowerment and Organizational Change: A Systems Perspective (American Anthropological Association, 1993, editor).
- The Biocultural Basis of Health: Expanding Views of Medical Anthropology (Waveland Press, 1980, co-authored with Lorna Moore, JoAnn Glittenberg and Robert Aldrich. Foreword by Jonas Salk).
- Processes of Transition: Vietnamese in Colorado (High Street Press, 1980, co-edited with James A. Pisarowicz).
- Perspectives on Development in Asmat: An Asmat Sketch Book (Crosier Press, 1975).
