= Mappi River =

Coordinates: 7.0°S 139.26667°E

Mapi River Sungai Mapi, Sungai Mappi, Mappi-rivier
- Location of river mouth

Location
- Country: Indonesia

Physical characteristics
- Source
  - location: South Papua
- Mouth: Digul
- Length: 145 km (90 mi)
- Basin size: 8,307 km^{2} (3,207 mi^{2}) 9,581.7 km^{2} (3,699.5 mi^{2})
- Discharge
  - average: (Period: 2002–2011)580 m^{3}/s (20,000 cu ft/s) (Period: 1971–2000)540.7 m^{3}/s (19,090 cu ft/s)

The Mapi River or Mappi River (Indonesian: Sungai Mapi) is a river in South Papua, Indonesia.

== Geography ==
The river flows in South Papua with a predominantly tropical rainforest climate (designated as Af in the Köppen-Geiger climate classification). The annual average temperature in the area is 22 °C. The warmest month is February when the average temperature is around 24 °C, and the coldest is June, at 20 °C. The average annual rainfall is 3143 mm. The wettest month is February, with an average of 403 mm rainfall, and the driest is July, with 66 mm rainfall. The average rainfall for the whole catchment area between 2002 and 2011 was 3577 mm.

== See also ==
- List of drainage basins of Indonesia
- List of rivers of Indonesia
- List of rivers of Western New Guinea
- Mappi River Awyu language
