= Merauke Regency =

Regency in South Papua, Indonesia

Merauke Regency Kabupaten Merauke
- Regency
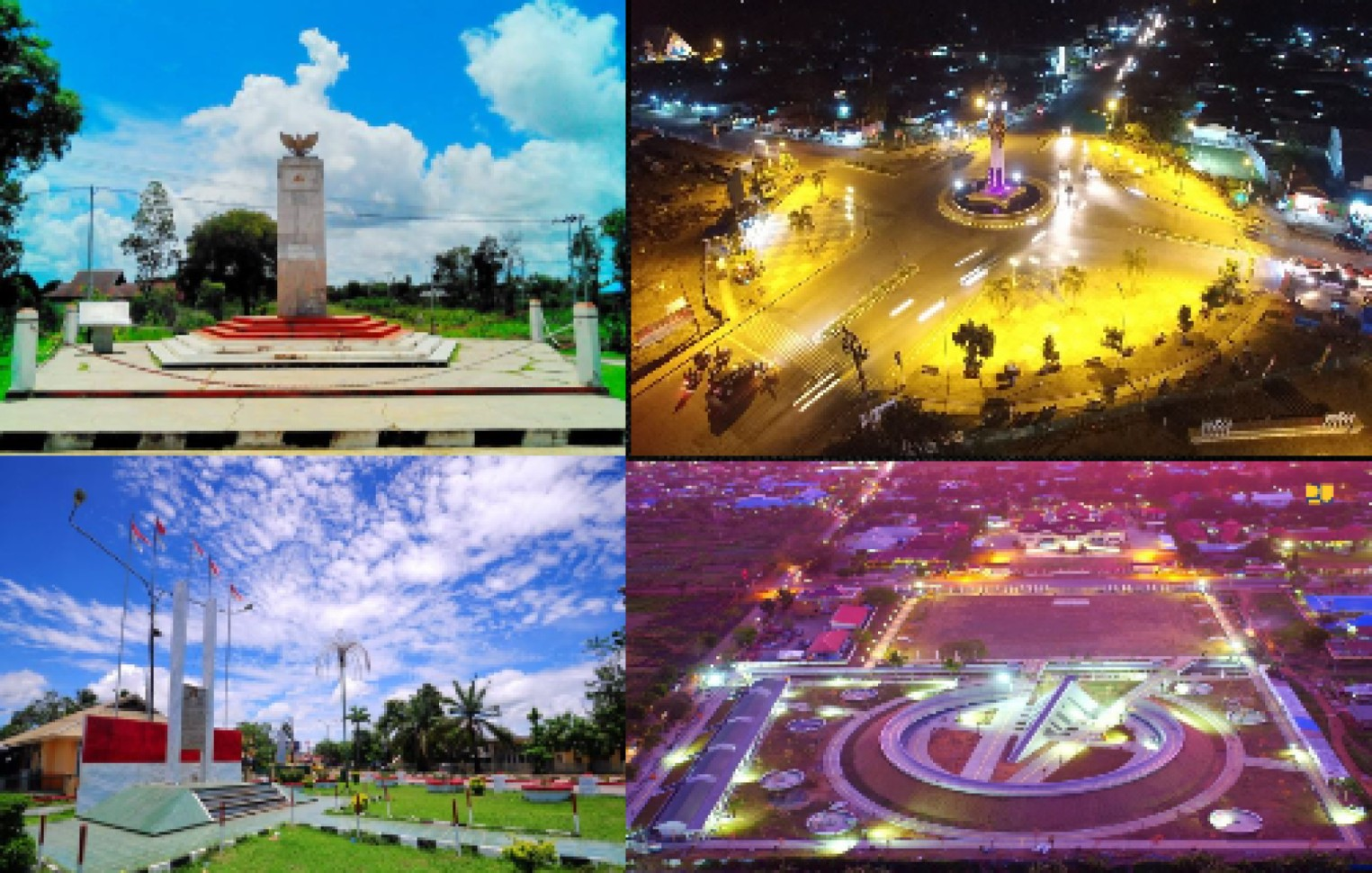
- From top-left clockwise; Sabang-Merauke Monument, Brawijaya Circle Monument at Night, Indonesia Time Capsule Monument, Act of Free Choice Monument.

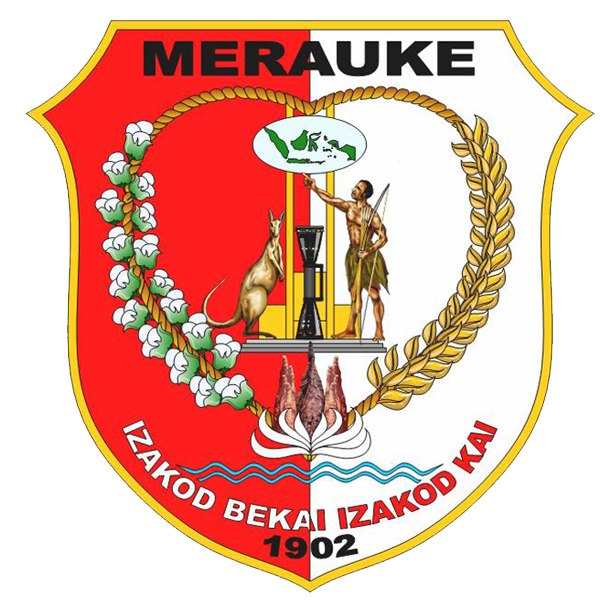
- Coat of arms
- Motto(s): Izakod Bekai Izakod Kai (One Heart, One Goal)

- Location in Western New Guinea and Indonesia Merauke Regency (Indonesia)
- Coordinates: 7.6667°S 139.6667°E
- Country: Indonesia
- Province: South Papua
- Regency seat: Merauke

Government
  - Regent: Yospeh Bladib Gebze (Indp.)
  - Vice Regent: Fauzan Nihayah
  - Legislature: Merauke Regency House of Representatives

Area
  - Total: 45,013.35 km^{2} (17,379.75 sq mi)

Population (mid 2025 estimate)
  - Total: 255,168
  - Density: 5.66872/km^{2} (14.6819/sq mi)

Demographics
  - Religion: Christianity 58,41% –Catholicism 39,65% –Protestantism 18,76% Islam 41,17% Hinduism 0,27% Buddhism 0,15%
- Time zone: UTC+9 (Indonesia Eastern Time)
- Area code: (+62) 971
- Website: merauke.go.id

Merauke Regency is a regency in the far south of the Indonesian province of South Papua. It covers an area of 45,013.35 km^{2}, and had a population of 195,716 at the 2010 Census and 230,932 at the 2020 Census; the official estimate as of mid-2024 was 255,168, comprising 132,601 males and 122,567 females. The administrative centre is the town of Merauke; the town was projected since 2013 to become an independent city (kota) separate from Merauke Regency, but the alteration has been deferred subsequently by the Indonesian Government's moratorium on the creation of new cities and regencies. It is also the provincial capital of the province of South Papua, although this is to be moved to a specially-built new location in Salor located in Kurik District to the northwest of Merauke. Merauke is the largest regency in Indonesia, with an area of 45,013.35 km^{2}, slightly larger than Estonia.

== History ==
Until 2002, the regency covered a much wider area of southern Papua, but much of the area was split off on 12 November 2002 to form the new regencies of Asmat, Mappi, and Boven Digoel. The four regencies were in 2022 re-grouped to form the new South Papua province.

== Demographics ==
=== Ethnicity ===
Several of the ethnic groups originating from Merauke are the Marind (or also called the Marind-Anim) and the Sohoers. There are various sub-clans of the Marind people, such as Kaize, Gebze, Balagaize, Mahuze, Ndiken, and Basik-Basik. Apart from that, there is also half of the population of Merauke who are Merauke Javanese people, transmigrants from the Dutch colonial period who came from Java.

In Dutch colonial period, the local residents lived side by side with the Dutch government employees. After the Western New Guinea integration with Indonesia, the development of the regency then followed by a population increase coming from various regions in the country. As of 2010 Indonesian census male population data, the population of indigenous Papuans in Merauke Regency is 37,731 (36.60%), while non-native Papuans is 65,347 (63.40%).

=== Religion ===
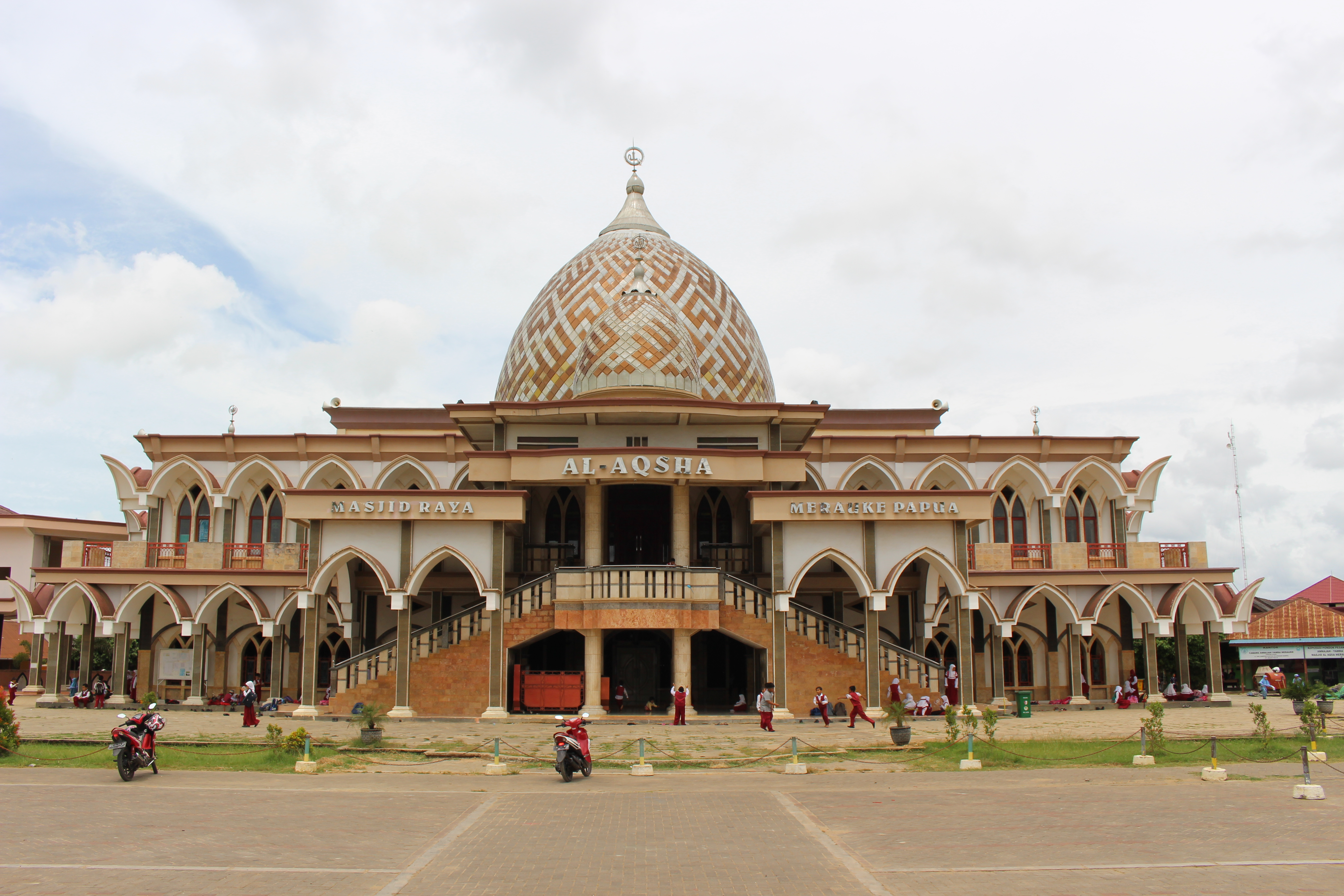
Al-Aqsha Grand Mosque in Merauke

A 2021 data from Central Agency on Statistics of Merauke Regency indicates that the majority of Merauke Regency population adheres to Christianity (52.84%). The Catholics makes up the majority of them (36.61%) and the remainings are Protestants (16.23%). Another significant religions in the regency is Islam (46.56%), followed by Buddhism (0.44%) and Hindu (0.16%).

== Administrative districts ==
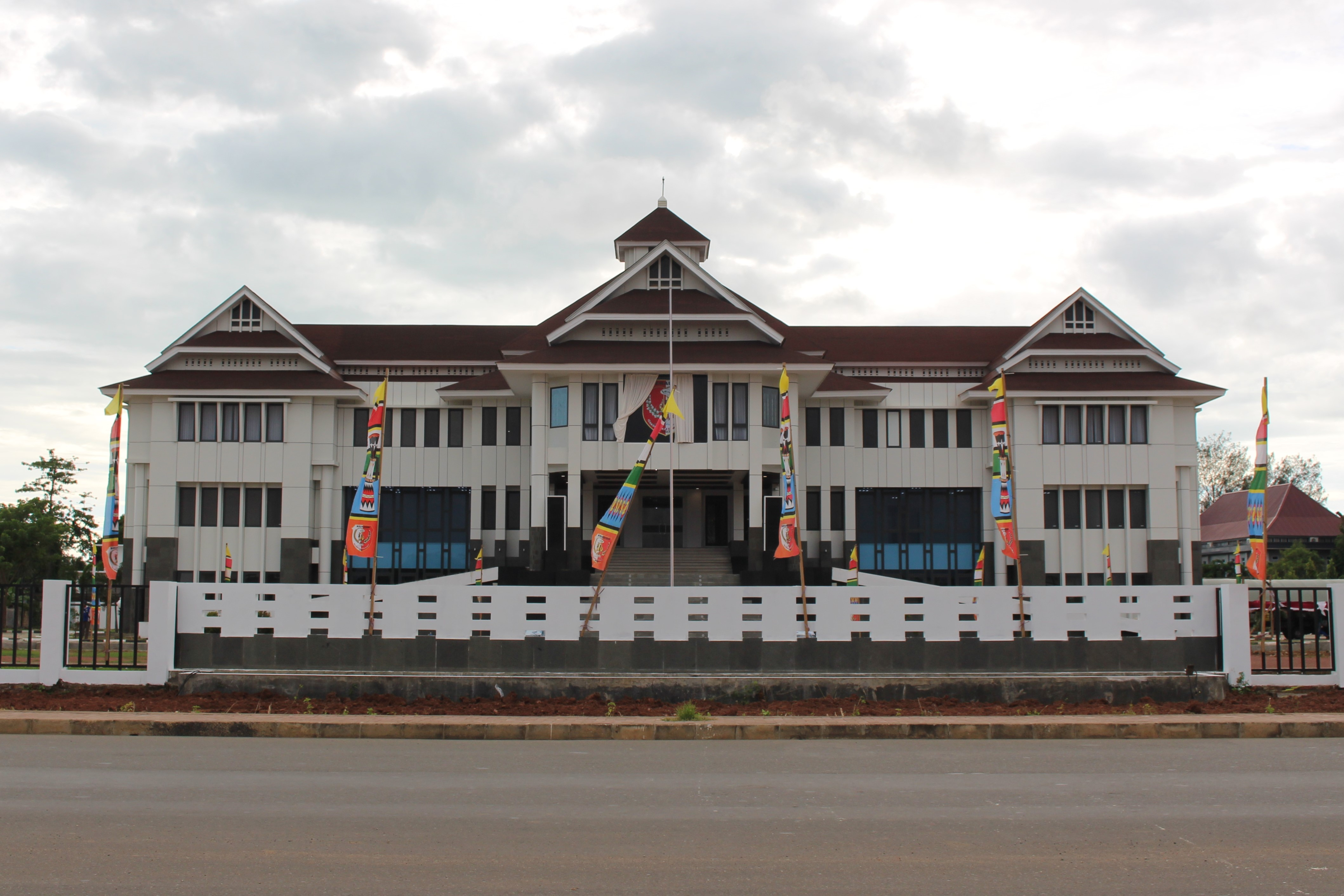
Merauke Regency office

At the 2020 Census, Merauke Regency comprised twenty districts (distrik), listed below with their areas and populations at the 2010 Census and the 2020 Census, together with the official estimates as of mid-2024. Two additional districts have subsequently been created - Kontuar from part of Waan District, and Padua from parts of Kimaam, Tabonji and Ilyawab Districts) - but their population details for the 2010 and 2020 Censuses are included with the districts from which they were cut out. The table also includes the locations of the district administrative centres, the number of administrative villages in each district (totalling 179 rural kampung and 11 urban kelurahan, the latter all in Merauke District) and its post code.

Kode Wilayah	Name of District (distrik)	Area in km^{2}	Pop'n 2010 census	Pop'n 2020 census	Pop'n mid 2024 estimate	Admin center	No. of villages	Post code
93.01.04	Kimaam	4,009.98	5,605	6,024	5,697	Kimaam	13	99641
93.01.19	Waan	2,519.03	4,364	3,413	2,461	Waan	6	99643
93.01.22	Kontuar	2,405.62	^{(a)}	^{(a)}	1,236	Wantarma	5	99643
93.01.17	Tabonji	2,843.74	4,941	3,838	3,167	Tabonji	7	99642
93.01.20	Ilwayab	2,496.20	4,941	3,856	2,679	Wanam	4	99640
93.01.21	Padua	1,447.58	^{(b)}	^{(b)}	2,585	Padua	5	99640: 99642
93.01.03	Okaba	1,812.82	4,752	4,132	4,644	Okaba	9	99638
93.01.15	Tubang	1,881.32	2,169	2,679	2,611	Yowied	6	99639
93.01.16	Ngguti	2,332.46	1,817	3,618	2,626	Po Epe	6	99637
93.01.18	Kaptel	3,446.89	1,681	1,796	1,565	Kaptel	5	99636
93.01.11	Kurik	760.73	13,162	16,235	17,223	Harapan Makmur	13	99646
93.01.14	Malind	549.47	8,753	10,503	11,007	Kaiburse	7	99647
93.01.13	Animha	1,917.67	1,881	2,317	2,426	Wayau	5	99644
93.01.01	Merauke (district)	500.41	87,634	102,351	116,864	Merauke (town)	^{(c)} 16	99604: 99619
93.01.05	Semangga	357.94	12,816	15,811	17,190	Muram Sari	10	99631
93.01.06	Tanah Miring	1,211.81	16,770	19,968	22,164	Hidup Baru	14	99632
93.01.07	Jagebob	1,369.37	6,943	8,001	8,497	Kartini	14	99645
93.01.08	Sota	2,757.29	2,831	3,461	3,717	Sota	5	99648
93.01.12	Naukenjerai	1,770.00	1,830	2,500	2,600	Onggaya	5	99621
93.01.02	Muting	3,352.41	5,036	6,068	7,286	Muting	12	99634
93.01.10	Elikobel	1,627.27	3,748	5,106	6,132	Bupul	12	99633
93.01.09	Ulilin	3,643.34	4,042	9,255	10,791	Kumaaf	11	99635
	Totals	45,013.35	195,716	230,932	255,168	Merauke	190	

Note: (a) the population figures for the new Kontuar District are included with those for Waan District, from part of which it was cut out. (b) the population figures for the new Padua District are included with those for Kimaam, Tabonji and Ilwayab Districts, from parts of which it was cut out. (c) containing all of the regency's 11 kelurahan (urban villages) and 5 kampung.

== Forests ==
Much of the area of Merauke Regency is covered by forests. The Wasur National Park forms part of the largest wetland in the regency.

MIFEE (Merauke Integrated Food and Energy Estate) is a project for use of a big area for industry and also palm oil and food crops agriculture including land grabbing. MIFEE is supported by the national government. There is much indigenous opposition to the MIFEE project. The MIFEE project is expected to cover a 1.2 million hectare area, or a quarter of Merauke. The project threatens conservation areas, such as virgin forests and water catchment areas, as well as the habitat of indigenous peoples in Papua. There were substantial forest fires.

By May 2011, Indonesian government allocated around two million hectares in the regency to 36 national and international corporations for oil palm, timber, and sugarcane enterprises.

== Transportation ==
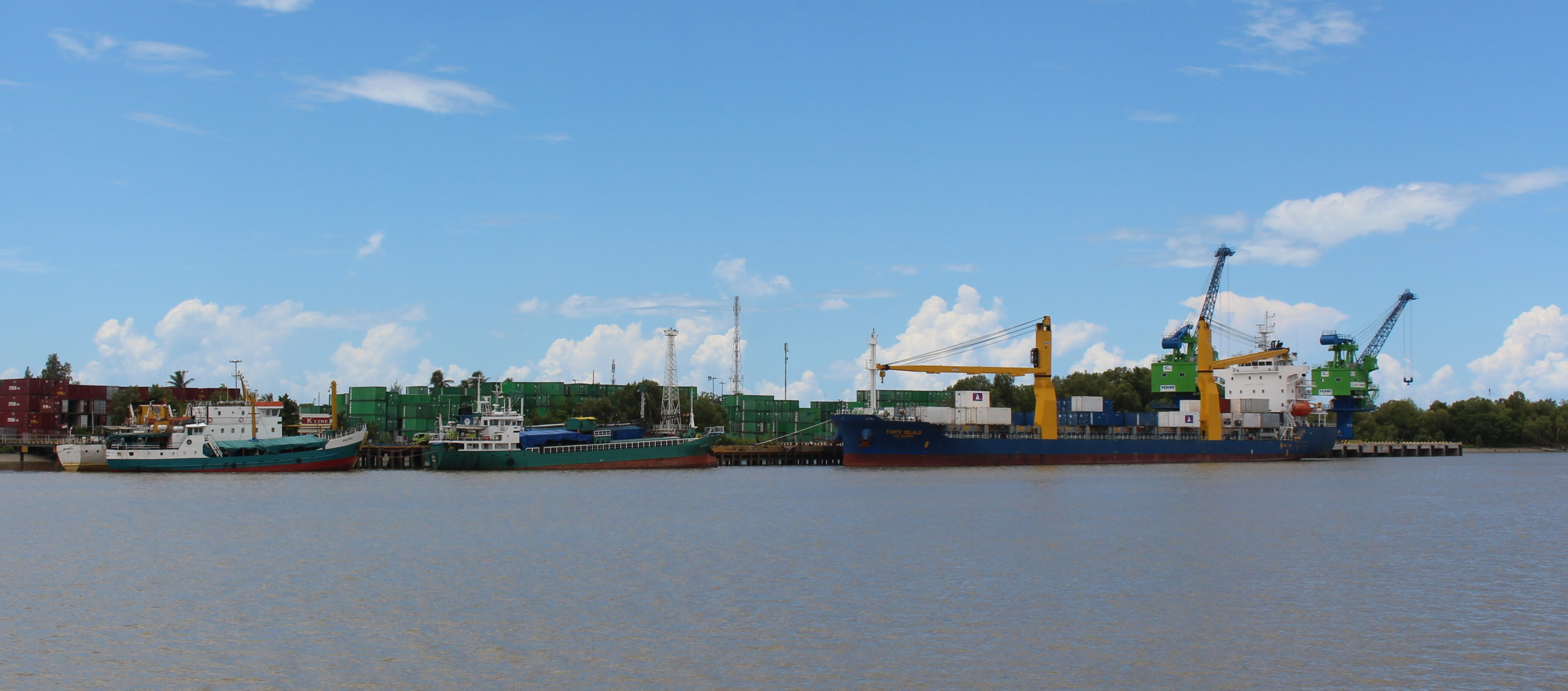
Port of Merauke

Merauke Regency is equipped by a passenger port, serving Pelni ships, as well as Mopah International Airport serving domestic flights.

== See also ==
- Merauke Five
