= Digul =

River in Indonesia

Sungai Digul Oewamba Rivier, Digoel-rivier, Oewimboe, Digoel Oewimboe, Digoel-Kian, Uwimbu, Digul
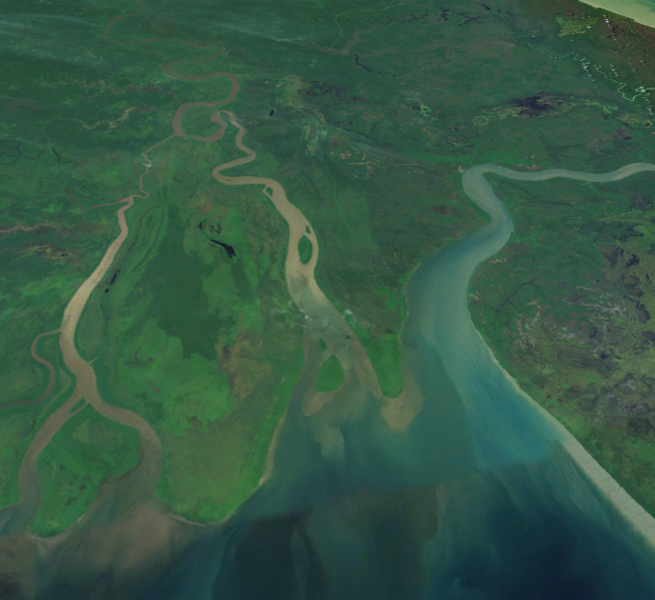
- NASA Landsat image (enhanced) of the Digul Estuary, looking roughly east. Dolak can be seen towards the south.

- Location of river mouth Digul (South Papua)

Location
- Country: Indonesia
- Province: Papua

Physical characteristics
- Source: Maoke Mountains
  - coordinates: 4°53′33.4068″S 140°23′52.9512″E
  - elevation: 3,700 m (12,100 ft)
- Mouth
  - location: Arafura Sea
  - coordinates: 7°7′S 138°42′E
  - elevation: 0 m (0 ft)
- Length: 853 km (530 mi)
- Basin size: 46,947.24 km^{2} (18,126.43 mi^{2})
- Width
  - average: 300–900 m (980–2,950 ft) (Lower Digul)
- Depth
  - minimum: 6 m (20 ft) (Lower Digul)
  - maximum: 28 m (92 ft) (Lower Digul)
- Discharge
  - location: Digul Delta
  - average: 3,867.2 m^{3}/s (136,570 cu ft/s)

Basin features
- Progression: Arafura Sea
- River system: Digul River
- Tributaries
  - left: Digul Timur, Takum, Murup, Anggarap, Mandobo, Uwimmerah
  - right: Arup, Kia, Ederah, Mappi, Uwamba

The Digul River (Dutch: Digoel) is a major river in South Papua province, Indonesia, on the island of New Guinea. It is the fourth longest river in New Guinea after Sepik, Mamberamo, and Fly. With a total length of 853 km (530 mi) and a drainage basin of 47,000 km^{2} (18,000 sq mi).

== Course ==
The river originates in the central part of the island, on the southern side of the Maoke Mountains (Digul or Star Mountains), which rise above sea level at 4,700 m. After leaving the mountainous section, it cuts through lowland swamps in a south-southwest direction and then flows by delta into the Arafura Sea, across Dolak Island. Its marshy, swampy floodplain is lined with reed beds. As there are no accessible and developed roads in the area, the river is still the only transport route across the marshes to the fertile hills and mountains in the interior of the island. It is navigable by larger boats from Tanahmerah (320 km) and by smaller boats from the foot of the mountains. This swampy navigable stretch is often referred to as Boven-Digul. Its length as the crow flies from its source to its mouth is relatively short, but it follows a very winding course over flat land to the sea.

== History ==
The swamplands upstream were known by the name "Boven-Digoel" (Above the Digul, in Dutch) and hosted a penal colony at Tanahmerah (Red Earth) in the early 20th century, when Indonesia was a colony of Holland. As a result of the abortive 1926 revolt by the Communist Party of Indonesia (PKI), the Dutch exiled 823 of the most troublesome revolutionaries here.

== Geography and hydrology ==
Rising on the southern slopes of Maoke Mountains, the Digul flows first south and then west to empty into the Arafura Sea. For much of its length, it travels across a low region of extensive swamps and creates a delta near Dolak (Yos Sudarso Island, formerly Frederik Hendrik) Island. The river has a length of 853 km (530 mi) and is navigable as far as Tanahmerah. Together with the Mappi, which joins its northernmost delta, it collects the waters of an area of about 45,000 square kilometres.

The river flows in the southern area of Papua with predominantly tropical monsoon climate (designated as Am in the Köppen-Geiger climate classification) and tropical rainforest (designated as Af in the Köppen-Geiger climate classification) transitional type, with an annual rainfall of 3,500–4,000 mm.

Sungai Digul

Climate chart (precipitation, max. and min. temperature)
J	F	M	A	M	J	J	A	S	O	N	D
464 25 19	396 22 20	342 23 22	346 24 23	249 24 21	178 22 18	28 22 20	51 24 21	93 25 22	235 25 23	336 25 21	355 25 23
- █ Average max. and min. temperatures in °C
- █ Precipitation totals in mm
Imperial conversion
J	F	M	A	M	J	J	A	S	O	N	D
18 77 66	16 72 68	13 73 72	14 75 73	9.8 75 70	7 72 64	1.1 72 68	2 75 70	3.7 77 72	9.3 77 73	13 77 70	14 77 73
- █ Average max. and min. temperatures in °F
- █ Precipitation totals in inches

The annual average temperature in the area is 22 °C. The warmest month is April, when the average temperature is around 24 °C, and the coldest is June, at 20 °C. The average annual rainfall is 3,072 mm. The wettest month is January, with an average of 464 mm rainfall, and the driest is July, with 28 mm rainfall.

The average rainfall for the whole catchment area between 2002 and 2011 was 3,522 mm.

== Delta ==
Its delta is a relatively new tidal delta in development with wide and deep delta branches and channels. The intermittent tides reach 5–7 metres. The delta is changing rapidly from year to year (new channels and delta branches) due to the high sedimentation process (clay deposits, sedimentary silt) on the banks. The delta is rich in fauna and, although navigable, very sparsely populated.

== Ecology ==
The Digul catchment has a rich and diverse fauna. Around 100 endemic species are found here (Paradisaea apoda, Ptilinopus perlatus, Chelodina novaeguineae, Centropus violaceus, Alcedinidae, etc.). The mud islands of the delta are covered with marsh and forest vegetation. The dominant species are mangrove (Avicenia alba, Rhizophora apiculata), mahogany (Xylocarpus moluccensis), nipa palm (Nypa fruticans), marsh plant (Bruguiera cylindrica) and their hybrids (Rhizphora mucronata).

== Discharge ==
Digul River discharge
Period	Average discharge	Ref
Digul delta
	3,867.2 m^{3}/s (136,570 cu ft/s)*	
1971–2000	3,332.7 m^{3}/s (117,690 cu ft/s)	
2002–2011	2,760 m^{3}/s (97,000 cu ft/s)	
2015–2019	3,027.89 m^{3}/s (106,929 cu ft/s)	
Before delta
1971–2000	2,443.9 m^{3}/s (86,310 cu ft/s)	
1979–2015	69.42 km^{3}/a (2,200 m^{3}/s)	
1996–2005	68.251 km^{3}/a (2,162.7 m^{3}/s)	
2002–2011	2,127 m^{3}/s (75,100 cu ft/s)	
2003–2015	82.6 km^{3}/a (2,620 m^{3}/s)	
2015–2019	1,999.09 m^{3}/s (70,597 cu ft/s)*	
Tanah Merah
1971–2000	1,140.7 m^{3}/s (40,280 cu ft/s)	

*Monthly flow (m^{3}/s):

Month	Before delta	Delta
JAN	2,066.8	4,077.8
FEB	2,401.4	5,137.5
MAR	2,463.6	5,072.1
APR	2,378.9	4,862.5
MAY	2,255.1	4,367.8
JUN	1,793.9	3,244.1
JUL	1,243	1,903.1
AUG	1,149.5	1,766.9
SEP	1,479.3	2,321.5
OCT	1,902.6	3,404.3
NOV	2,426.9	4,944.6
DEC	2,488.2	5,304
Avg.	1,999.1	3,867.2

== Tributaries ==
The main tributaries from the mouth:

Left tributary	Right tributary	Length (km)	Basin size (km^{2})	Average discharge (m^{3}/s)^{*}
Digul		853	42,142.6	3,332.7
	Uwamba		1,268.3	98.8
	Mappi	524.98	9,581.7	540.7
	Ederah	170	2,277.4	113.2
	Kia		1,272.3	68.7
Uwim-merah			6,437.4	777.4
Mandobo			1,397.6	118.9
Anggarap			562.2	55.5
Murup			440.7	50.9
Takum			543.3	60.3
	Arup		1,077.8	104.2
Digul Timur		196.06	3,166	541.2

^{*}Period: 1971–2000

== See also ==
- List of drainage basins of Indonesia
- List of rivers of Oceania
- List of rivers of Indonesia
- List of rivers by discharge
- Southern New Guinea freshwater swamp forests
