= Greater Awyu languages =

Language family in Papua

Greater Awyu
- Digul River
- Geographic distribution: Digul watershed, South Papua, Indonesia
- Linguistic classification: Trans–New Guinea: Central West New Guinea; Awyu–Ok; Greater Awyu
- Proto-language: Proto-Digul River
- Subdivisions: Awyu–Dumut; Becking–Dawi; Sawi

Language codes
- Glottolog: grea1275
- Map: The Awyu–Dumut languages of New Guinea The Awyu–Dumut languages (other languages not shown) Other Trans–New Guinea languages Other Papuan languages Austronesian languages Uninhabited

The Greater Awyu or Digul River languages, known in earlier classifications with more limited scope as Awyu–Dumut (Awyu–Ndumut), are a family of perhaps a dozen Trans–New Guinea languages primarily spoken in South Papua Province, near the Digul River. Six of the languages are sufficiently attested for a basic description; it is not clear how many of the additional names (in parentheses below) may be separate languages.

== History ==
The Awyu (pronounced like English Ow you) and Awyu–Dumut families were identified by Peter Drabbe in the 1950s.

Voorhoeve included them in his proposed Central and South New Guinea group. As part of Central and South New Guinea, they form part of the original proposal for Trans–New Guinea.

== Classification ==
The classification below is based on Usher and de Vries et al. (2012), who used morphological innovations to determine relatedness, which can be obscured by lexical loanwords.

- Sawi (Sawuy)
- Awyu–Dumut (Central Digul River)
  - Awyu languages: Aghu (Jair), Shiaxa (Jenimu, Edera), Pisa (Asuwe)
  - Ndeiram–Ndumut
    - Dumut (Wambon) branch: Mandobo (Kaeti, Dumut), Wambon
    - Ndeiram River: Kombai–Wanggom
- North Digul River
  - Awbono-Bayono
  - Becking–Dawi
    - Dawi River: Komyandaret, Tsaukambo
    - Becking River: Korowai

Sawi is classified on pronominal data, as the morphological data used for the rest of the family is not available.

Pawley and Hammarström (2018) exclude Awbono-Bayono, treating it as a separate family.

Various other languages can be found in the literature. Airo-Sumaxage (Airo-Sumaghage) is listed in Wurm, Foley, etc., but not in the University of Amsterdam survey and has been dropped by Ethnologue. Ethnologue lists a 'Central Awyu', but this is not attested as a distinct language (U. Amsterdam). In general, the names in Ethnologue are quite confused, and older editions speak of names from Wurm (1982), such as Mapi, Kia, Upper Digul, Upper Kaeme, which are names of language surveys along the rivers of those names, and may actually refer to Ok languages rather than to Awyu.

van den Heuvel & Fedden (2014) argue that Greater Awyu and Greater Ok are not genetically related, but that their similarities are due to intensive contact.

== Reconstruction ==
Proto-Digul River
- Reconstruction of: Greater Awyu languages
- Reconstructed ancestors: Proto-Trans–New Guinea: Proto-Awyu–Ok

=== Phonemes ===
Usher (2020) reconstructs "perhaps" 15 consonants and 8 vowels, as follows:

		Bilabial	Alveolar	Palatal	Velar	
		Bilabial	Alveolar	Palatal	plain	labialized
Nasal		*m	*n			
Plosive	plain	*p	*t		*k	*kʷ
Plosive	prenasalized	*ᵐb	*ⁿd	*ⁿdz	*ᵑɡ	*ᵑɡʷ
Fricative			*s			
Semivowel		*w		*j		
Rhotic			*ɾ			

	Front	Central	Back
Close	*i		*u
Close-mid	*e		*o
Open-mid	*ɛ		*ɔ
Open		*a	*ɒ

=== Pronouns ===
Usher (2020) reconstructs the pronouns as:

	sg	pl
1	*nup	
2	*ngup	*ngip
3		

Ross (2005) reconstructs the pronouns of the Awyu–Dumut branch as follows:

	sg	pl
1	*nu-p	*na-gu-p
2	*gu-p	*ga-gu-p
3	*e-p, *[n]ege-p, *yu-p	*ya-gu-p

The suffix *-p and the change of the final TNG *a vowel to *u do not appear in the possessive pronouns: *na, *ga, *ya/wa, *na-ga, *ga-ga, *ya-ga.

=== Basic vocabulary ===
==== Healey (1970) and Voorhoeve (2000) ====
The following selected reconstructions of Proto-Awyu-Dumut, Proto-Awyu, and Proto-Dumut by Voorhoeve are from Healey (1970) and Voorhoeve (2000), as cited in the Trans-New Guinea database:

gloss	Proto-Awyu-Dumut	Proto-Awyu	Proto-Dumut
head	*kɑibɑn; *xaiban	*xaiban; *xɑibɑn	*kɑbiɑn; *kebian
hair	*möxö; *muk; *ron	*mox; *mux; *ron	*mökö-ron; *muk; *ron
ear	*turun	*turun	*turutop; *turu=top
eye	*kerop	*kero	*kerop
nose	*togut		*togut
tongue	*fɔgat; *fɔgɛt; *pogɑt	*fagɛ; *fɑge	*ogat; *pɑgɑt
louse	*gut	*go; *gu; *ɑgu	*gut
dog	*angay; *ɑgɑi; *set	*sɛ; *(y)ange; *(y)angi; *yɑgi	*agay; *ɑgɑi; *tit
pig	*wi	*wi	*uy
bird	*yet	*yi	*yet
egg	*wɑidin	*mugo	*wɑdin
blood	*gom	*gon	*gom
bone		*bogi	*mit
skin	*kɑt; *xa(t)	*xɑ; *xa	*kotay; *kɑtɑy
breast	*ɑm; *om	*om; **om	*om; *ɔm
tree	*yin	*yin	*in
woman	*ran; *rɑn	*ran; *rɑn	*ran; *rɑn
sky	**xuit	*xuito	*kut
sun	*seyɑt		*sɑt
moon	*wɑkot		*wɑkot
water	*ox	*ɔx; *óxo	*ok
fire	*yin	*yin	
stone	*irop	*ero; *iro	*irop
name	*füp; *pip	*fi	*fip; *üp
eat	*ɑde; *en; *ɛn-	*ɑde-; *en; *ɛn-	*ɑde; *en; *en-
two	*rumo; *rumon	*okorumon; **ok=rumɔ(n)	*irumon; *rumo

==== Usher (2020) ====
Some lexical reconstructions of Proto-Digul River and lower-level reconstructions by Usher (2020) are:

gloss	Proto-Digul River	Sawuy	Proto-North Digul	Proto-Central Digul
head	*kamb[e̝]jan		*kabe̝jan	*kambijan
leaf/hair	*mo̝k	moːx	*mo̝k	*mo̝k
tongue	*te̝p	seːp ~ seɸ	*te̝p	
skin/bark			*kat	*kat
breast		aːm	*am	*ɒm
dog	*tit	siːr	*tit	*tit
bird	*ndzeːt	eːr	*dze̝t	*je̝t
egg	*mug[o/ɔ]	mugo		*mugɔ
sun/day	*[a]tap	ataːp		
moon	*wakɔɾ	oxaːr	*wakɔɾ	*wakɔɾ
water		aːx	*[a/ɔ]k	*ɔk

== Evolution ==
Greater Awyu reflexes of proto-Trans-New Guinea (pTNG) etyma are:

Wambon language:

- maŋgot ‘teeth, mouth’ < *maŋgat[a]
- (Wambon S.) kodok ‘leg’ < *k(a,o)ndok[V]
- mok ‘seed’ < *maŋgV
- kotay ‘bark, skin’ < *(ŋg,k)a(nd,t)apu
- kondok ‘bone’ < *kwanjaC
- kim- ‘die’ < *kumV-
- kinum- ‘sleep’ < *kin(i,u)-
- ok ‘water, river’ < *okV
- enop ‘fire’ < *kendop
- (ko)sep ‘ashes’ < *(kambu-)sumbu
- (Wambon N.) kumut ‘thunder’ < *kumut or *tumuk
- ururuk ko- ‘to fly’ < *pululu

Mandobo Atas language:

- am ‘breast’ < *amu
- magot ‘mouth’ < *maŋgat[a]
- koman ‘neck’ < *k(o,u)ma(n,ŋ)[V]
- (a)moka ‘cheek’ < *mVkVm ‘cheek, jaw’
- kere(top) ‘ear’ < *kand(e,i)k(V]
- betit ‘fingernail’ < *mb(i,u)t(i,u)C
- kodok ‘foot, leg’ < *k(a,o)ndok[V]
- otae ‘bark, skin’ < *(ŋg,k)a(nd,t)apu
- kiow ‘wind’ < *kumbutu
- komöt ‘thunder’ < *kumut
- üp ‘name’ < *imbi
- kinum- ‘sleep’ < *kin(i,u)-
- (ko)tep ‘ashes’ < *(kambu-)sumbu
- ok ‘water, river’ < *okV
- apap ‘butterfly’ < *apa(pa)ta

Pisa language:

- mugo ‘egg’ < *maŋgV, kiri
- mogo ‘eye’ < *kiti-maŋgV
- kifi ‘wind’ < *kumbutu
- ise ‘mosquito’ < *kasin
- apero ‘butterfly’ < *apa(pa)ta
- kunu (ri-) ‘sleep’ < *kin(i,u)-
- kekuŋ- ‘carry on the shoulder’ < *kak(i,u)-

Syiaxa language:

- fi ‘name’ < *imbi
- apa ‘butterfly’ < *apa([pa]pata
- boro ‘to fly’ < *pululu
