= Mappi Regency =

Regency in South Papua, Indonesia

Mappi Regency Kabupaten Mappi
- Regency
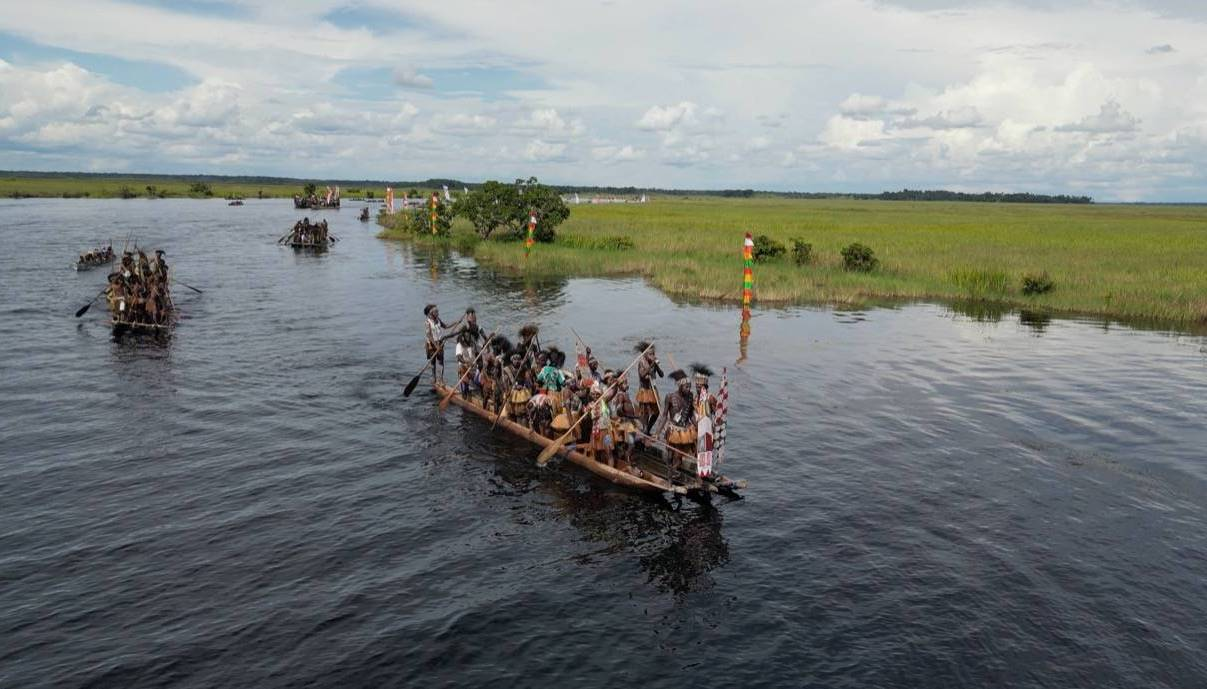
- Festival Sejuta Rawa (Thousand Swamps Festival)

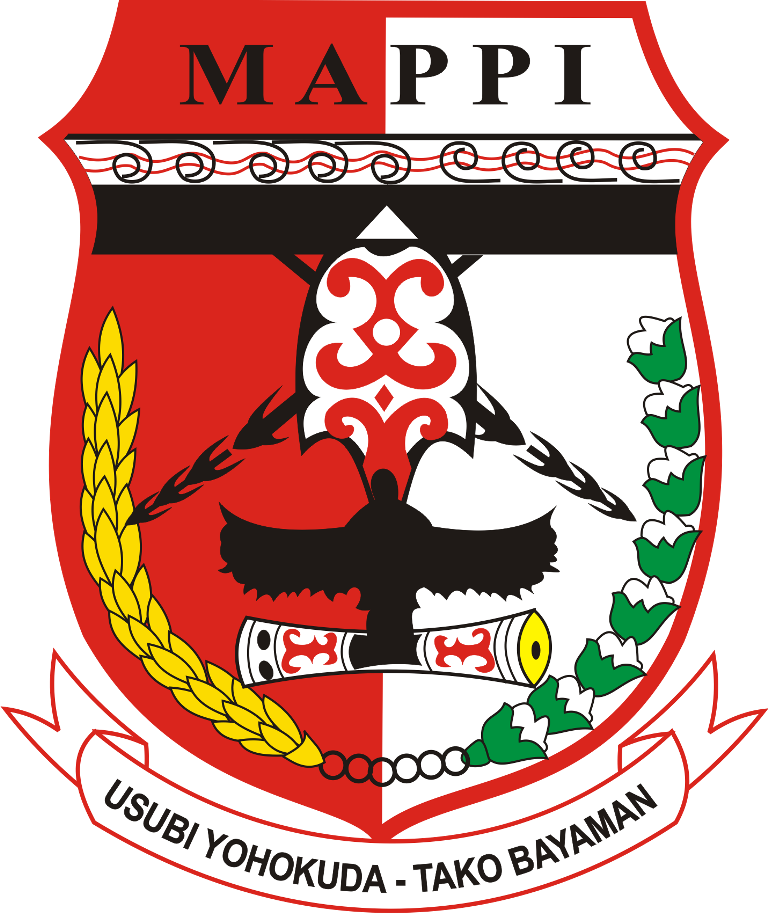
- Coat of arms
- Motto(s): Usubi Yohokuda - Tako Bayaman (Peace in One Heart - Serving Each Other)

- Location in Western New Guinea and Indonesia Mappi Regency (Indonesia)
- Coordinates: 6.4997°S 139.3444°E
- Country: Indonesia
- Province: South Papua
- Capital: Kepi

Government
  - Regent: Kristosimus Agawemu
  - Vice Regent: Ibnu Jaya Suud

Area
  - Total: 25,609.94 km^{2} (9,888.05 sq mi)

Population (mid 2024 estimate)
  - Total: 114,153
  - Density: 4.45737/km^{2} (11.5445/sq mi)
- Time zone: UTC+9 (Indonesia Eastern Time)
- Area code: (+62) 411
- Website: mappikab.go.id

Mappi Regency is a regency (kabupaten) in the Indonesian province of South Papua. It was split off from Merauke Regency (of which it had been a component part) on 12 November 2002. It covers an area of 25,609.94 km^{2}, and had a population of 81,658 at the 2010 Census and 108,295 at the 2020 Census; the official estimate as of mid-2024 was 114,153 (comprising 58,942 males and 55,211 females). The administrative centre is the town of Kepi.

== Administrative districts ==
Mappi Regency in 2010 comprised ten districts (distrik). However, by 2015 the number of districts had been increased to fifteen; the five additional districts that had been created since 2010 comprise Bamgi, Passue Bawah, Syahcame, Ti Zain and Yakomi.

The districts are listed below with their areas and their populations at the 2010 Census and that of 2020, together with the official estimates as of mid-2024. The table also includes the locations of the district administrative centres, the number of administrative villages in each district (totaling 162 rural kampung and 2 urban kelurahan - the latter being the towns of Kepi in Obaa District, and Bade in Edera District), and its post code.

| Kode Wilayah | Name of District (distrik) | Area in km^{2} | Pop'n 2010 Census | Pop'n 2020 Census | Pop'n mid 2024 estimate | Admin centre | No. of villages | Post code |
|---|---|---|---|---|---|---|---|---|
| 93.03.02 | Nambioman Bapai | 5,074.46 | 7,904 | 9,294 | 10,518 | Mur | 15 | 99873 |
| 93.03.09 | Minyamur | 2,433.81 | 4,310 | 5,531 | 5,727 | Kabe | 12 | 99872 |
| 93.03.04 | Edera | 1,392.69 | 12,191 | 8,906 | 8,490 | Bade | 7 | 99852 |
| 93.03.10 | Venaha | 1,705.34 | 3,849 | 2,573 | 2,568 | Sahapikia | 8 | 99854 |
| 93.03.11 | Syahcame | 626.75 | ^{(a)} | 2,856 | 4,358 | Asset | 6 | 99853 |
| 93.03.13 | Bamgi | 747.28 | ^{(a)} | 2,628 | 2,551 | Yeloba | 5 | 99851 |
| 93.03.12 | Yakomi | 1,843.03 | ^{(a)} | 2,090 | 1,965 | Yame | 7 | 99855 |
| 93.03.01 | Obaa | 2,224.21 | 19,454 | 34,956 | 35,287 | Kepi ^{(b)} | 24 | 99870 |
| 93.03.08 | Passue | 1,440.39 | 5,100 | 6,741 | 7,383 | Kotiak | 13 | 99871 |
| 93.03.05 | Haju | 1,180.85 | 8,774 | 9,724 | 11,023 | Yagatsu | 19 | 99881 |
| 93.03.06 | Assue | 2,422.93 | 8,887 | 10,549 | 10,480 | Eci | 18 | 99874 |
| 93.03.03 | Citakmitak | 1,244.82 | 7,211 | 5,279 | 5,648 | Senggo | 7 | 99875 |
| 93.03.07 | Kaibar | 1,499.03 | 3,978 | 2,310 | 2,601 | Amazu | 7 | 99876 |
| 93.03.14 | Passue Bawah | 1,190.40 | ^{(a)} | 2,829 | 3,075 | Wonggi | 8 | 99877 |
| 93.03.15 | Ti Zain | 583.95 | ^{(a)} | 2,029 | 2,479 | Kumaban | 8 | 99878 |
| | Totals | 25,609.94 | 81,658 | 108,295 | 114,153 | Kepi | 164 | |

Note: (a) the 2010 populations of these areas were included in the figures for the original districts from which they were cut out.
(b) the town of Kepi covered 13.6 km^{2} with 8,394 inhabitants at the 2020 Census.
