= Morehead Rural LLG =

Local-level government in Papua New Guinea

- District map of Western Province
- Country: Papua New Guinea
- Province: Western Province
- Time zone: UTC+10 (AEST)

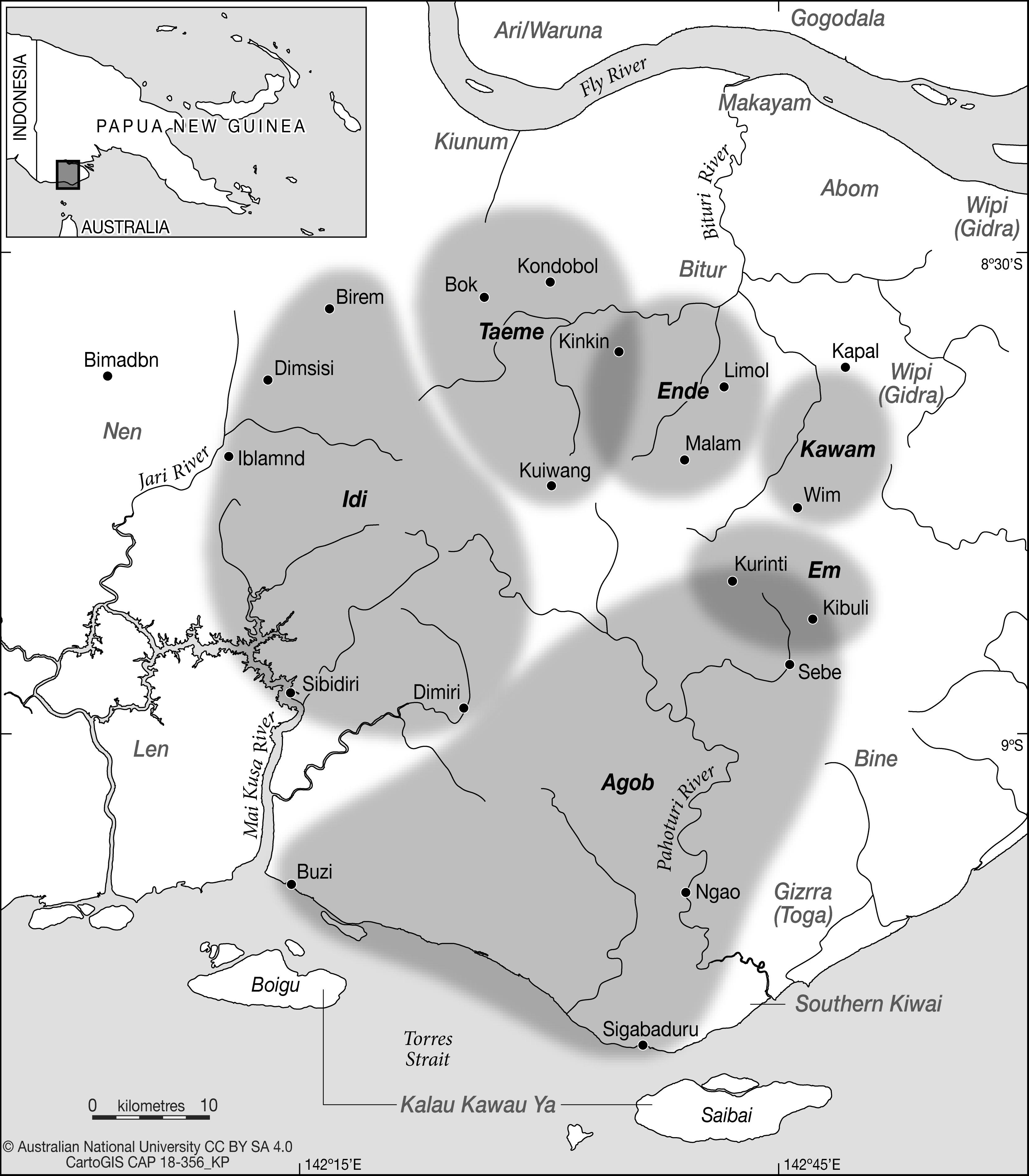
Map of Pahoturi languages

Morehead Rural LLG is a local-level government (LLG) of Western Province, Papua New Guinea. Merauke Regency, Indonesia is located adjacently to the west. Yam, Pahoturi, and Anim languages are spoken in the LLG.

== Wards ==
- 01. Bula (Kánchá language speakers)
- 02. Wereavere (Mblafe language speakers)
- 03. Wemnevere (Kémä language speakers)
- 04. Mibini (Namat language speakers)
- 05. Garaita (Nama language speakers)
- 06. Pongariki (Nambo language (Namna dialect) speakers)
- 07. Dimisisi (Idi language speakers)
- 08. Sibidiri (Idi language speakers)
- 09. Limol (Ende language speakers)
- 10. Keru (Neme language speakers)
- 11. Pukaduka
- 12. Kiriwo (Aramba language speakers)
- 13. Aewe
- 14. Wando (Warta Thuntai language speakers)
- 15. Kandarisa (Ránmo language speakers)
- 16. Rouku (Komnzo language speakers)
- 17. Morehead Station
- 18. Bimadeben (Nen speakers)
- 19. Eniyawa
- 20. Kautru
- 21. Kondobol (Taeme language speakers)
- 22. Malam (Ende language speakers)

== See also ==
- Yam languages
- Pahoturi languages
- Morehead River
