= Nggarna language =

Yam language spoken in Papua New Guinea

Nggarna
- Sota
- Native to: Indonesia
- Region: South Papua
- Ethnicity: Kanum Sota
- Native speakers: (100 cited 1996)
- Language family: Trans-Fly – Bulaka River?: Yam; Tonda; Nggarna

Language codes
- ISO 639-3: krz
- Glottolog: sota1242
- ELP: Sota Kanum

Nggarna (Ngar), or Sota (Sota Kanum), is a Yam language of in the village of Sota in Merauke Regency, Indonesia. Located in western which borders with Morehead Rural LLG, Western Province, Papua New Guinea. Despite identifying as Kanum, the language is closer to Rema across the border in Indonesia than it is to other Kanum languages of Papua New Guinea.
