= Yei people =

Yei
Yei-Nan
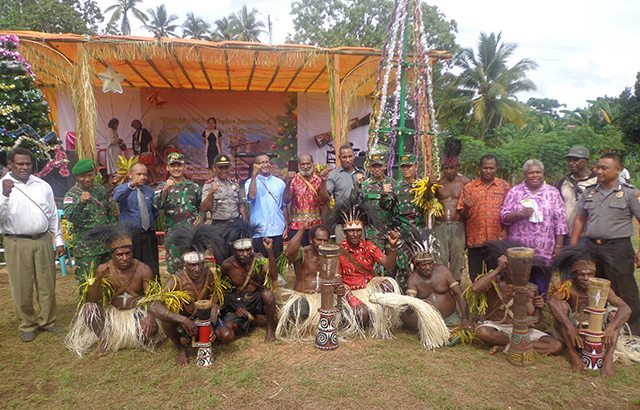
- Yei people with the Indonesian soldiers.

Total population
- 2,000

Regions with significant populations
- Indonesia (South Papua)

Languages
- Yei

Religion
- Christianity (majority) and indigenous belief

Related ethnic groups
- Marind, Kanum

Yei (Yey, Yeinan, or Yei Nan) is an ethnic group residing near the Indonesia–Papua New Guinea border in Merauke Regency, South Papua. The Yei is a sub-tribe of the Marind. The Yei have their own language, known as the Yei, which is divided into two dialects: Upper Yei and Lower Yei. The Yei language is part of the Yam or Morehead-Maro language family, making it closer to languages in Morehead, Papua New Guinea, rather than the language of the Marind, the majority tribe in Merauke Regency.

== Geography ==
Yei people are spread across several villages in the eastern part of Merauke Regency, near the border with Papua New Guinea. Yei is divided into two groups based on their dialect: Upper Yei and Lower Yei. The Upper Yei live in Tanas, Bupul, and Kweel in Elikobal District, while the Lower Yei reside in the Erambu and Toray in Sota District and Poo in Jagebob District.

Geographically, the Yei live in lowland areas consisting of forests, savannahs, and swamps. The Yei territory is easily accessible due to the presence of roads. Yei people make their living by fishing, hunting deer, wallabies, and wild boars, and gathering forest products, especially sago. The Yei also manage small-scale gardens where they grow bananas, coconuts, tubers, and vegetables. Yei villages are predominantly inhabited by the Yei themselves, but nearby areas have many transmigrant settlements and oil palm plantations.

== History ==
Yei people originally came from around the Fly River area in Papua New Guinea. They have long interacted with other tribes, such as the Buazi in Papua New Guinea and the Marind. Yei then moved westward to what is now Indonesian territory and established new settlements. In 1915, Christian missionaries arrived to spread their faith. Yei people who embraced Catholicism formed the village of Bupul, while Protestant Christians established Tanas. Other clans scattered across the region agreed to form a new village named Yelambui. Later, Yelambui was relocated further south to become the village now known as Erambu.

== Clans ==
Some clans of the Yei Nan include Kosnan, Jeraket, Mejai, Awaniter, Nekeljai, Pursa, Gubajai, Gebjai, Kabujai, Bejai, Waliter, Wanjai, Yebse, Kecanter, Murnan, Gemter, and Karegar.
