= Yey =

Yey may refer to:

- Yey!, a television channel broadcasting in the Philippines
- YEY, IATA code for the Amos/Magny Airport of Canada
- Yei language, or Yey, a Papuan language of Papua New Guinea

== See also ==
- Yei (disambiguation)
- Yay (disambiguation)
