= Tamer language =

Yam language

Tamer
- Smerki
- Kanum
- Region: Yanggandur in southeast Merauke Regency, Indonesia
- Ethnicity: Kanum
- Native speakers: 120 (2018)
- Language family: Trans-Fly – Bulaka River?: Yam; Tonda; Tamer

Language codes
- ISO 639-3: None (mis)
- Glottolog: None

Tamer (Tämer) is a Yam language of Yanggandur in southeast Merauke Regency, Indonesia. It forms a dialect continuum with Smerki (Smärki), and indeed goes by that name.
