= Blafe language =

Papuan language of New Guinea

Blafe
- Tonda
- Region: Western Province, Papua New Guinea
- Native speakers: 670 (2003)
- Language family: Trans-Fly – Bulaka River?: Yam; Tonda; Blafe
- Dialects: Blafe; Ranmo

Language codes
- ISO 639-3: bfh
- Glottolog: blaf1238

Blafe (Mblafe), also known as Tonda or Indorodoro/Yendorador, is a Papuan language of New Guinea. Dialects are Mblafe and Ránmo. It is centered in Indorodoro village (8.59196°S 141.29677°E) of Kandarisa ward (8.621418°S 141.2194°E), Morehead Rural LLG, Western Province, Papua New Guinea. Mblafe-speaking villages are located along eastern banks of the Bensbach River and inland areas to the east of the river.
