= Pahoturi =

Pahoturi may refer to:

- Pahoturi languages, a group of languages in Papua New Guinea
- Pahoturi River, a river south of the Fly River in Papua New Guinea
