= Nambu languages =

Papuan language cluster

Nambu
- East Morehead River
- Geographic distribution: New Guinea
- Native speakers: (3,000 cited 2000–2003)
- Linguistic classification: Trans-Fly – Bulaka River?: Yam; Nambu

Language codes
- Glottolog: namb1292

Nambu is a cluster of Papuan languages spoken in the Morehead River region of Papua New Guinea.

== Languages ==
Varieties are distinct but have some mutually intelligibility with their neighbors. Usher (2020) lists the following languages, with Nambo and Namna considered dialects of a single language.

East Morehead River

- Neme–Ndre: Ndre (Dre, Ndré-di), Neme (Karigari, Dorro, Moi-e, Moive)
- Upper Wassi Kussa: Nen (Nenium, Wekamara), Nambo–Namna (Nmbo, Nombuio, Tanjuamu, Keraki; Tendavi)
- Central East Morehead River
  - Namo–Län: Län (Len, Dapo, Dungerwab, Parb, Tuj), Namo (Kaunje)
  - Nama–Namat: Nama (Noraia), Namat (Potoia)
