= Nen language =

Nen language may refer to:

- Nen language (Cameroon) or Tunen or Banen, a Southern Bantoid language
- Nen language (Papuan) or Nen Zi, a Trans-Fly–Bulaka River language

== See also ==
- Nen (disambiguation)
