= Yelmek language =

Bulaka River language spoken in Indonesia

Yelmek
- Jab, Yabega
- Native to: Indonesia
- Region: Merauke Regency, South Papua
- Native speakers: (400 cited 1978)
- Language family: Bulaka River: Yelmek
- Dialects: Yelmek proper; Yab (Jab); Nggarum (Galum); Dib (Dibga)

Language codes
- ISO 639-3: jel
- Glottolog: jelm1234

Yelmek, also rendered Jelmek or Jelmik, is a language of the proposed Trans-Fly – Bulaka River family in West Papua.

Yelmek is spoken west of Merauke Regency, between the Digul River and Mbian River. Notable villages are (from north to south) Wanam Village on the Wanam River and Bibikem in Ilwayab District; Woboyo and Dodalim (Dudaling) Village in Tubang District. In the same district, related Maklew is spoken in Welbuti Village.

The Wanam variety might be a distinct language.

Petabahasa by Indonesian Ministry of Education, Culture, Research, and Technology used the name Yelmek for the variety of Mek languages used by the Yalimek people in Wanam Village in Abenaho District, Yalimo Regency, while this language is called Yabega.

== Phonology ==
Consonants
		Labial	Alveolar	Velar
Plosive	voiceless	p	t	k
Plosive	voiced	b	d	ɡ
Fricative			(s)	(h)
Nasal		m	n	ŋ
Approximant		w	l	j

The fricative phonemes are both marginal. /s/ appears in only a small number of words, most of which are known to be loans. Speakers are not consistent either between each other or themselves in which words contain /h/, with many words claimed to have it being pronounced without it, and words that lack it surfacing with it, in an apparent case of hypercorrection. While Gregor includes /h/ in her 2020 thesis, she does not in her 2021 book chapter.

Vowels
	Front	Central	Back
Close	i	ʉ	u
Mid	e	ə	o
Open	a		

== Grammar ==
Nouns in Yelmek are not morphologically complex. They have gender and number, but these are not marked on the noun itself, but on other parts of the sentence; number and gender are marked on the verb, and number is also marked on attributive modifiers of the noun. Modifiers in Yelmek occur in their underived root form when functioning as the predicate of a clause, but to serve as an attributive modifier within a noun phrase, must take an attributive suffix, which agrees in number with the head noun. Case marking occurs at the level of the noun phrase, not the noun, with the final element of the noun phrase being followed by a case assigning clitic or postposition.
