= Aramba language =

Papuan language of Papua New Guinea

Aramba
- Region: New Guinea
- Native speakers: 970 (2003)
- Language family: Trans-Fly – Bulaka River?: Yam; Tonda; Aramba

Language codes
- ISO 639-3: stk
- Glottolog: aram1253

Aramba (formerly spelled Arammba) is a Papuan language of Papua New Guinea. It is spoken to the south of Western Province in the Trans Fly region. Aramba belongs to the Tonda Sub-Family, which is next to the Nambu Sub-Family region and the Suki language. Alternative names for the language include Upper Morehead (a name shared with the Upper Morehead language), Rouku, Kamindjo and Tjokwasi.

== Background ==
The Aramba language is spoken in five main villages by approximately 2000 people. Children learn how to read and write the Aramba language in preschool, before entering primary school which is conducted in English.

The Aramba people are semi nomadic, and live off the animals and plants in the surrounding rainforest and savannah. They also have gardens in which primarily yams are grown, but this depends on the season (Boevé & Boevé, 1999). There is no cash economy and few basic services. Aid posts for healthcare services are usually understaffed and have no supplies. While elementary school in the vernacular language is available, most do not have reading and writing materials. It is rare for students to go to secondary school as there are no secondary schools around. The Aramba region could be accessed by airplane, or by boat from the provincial capital, Daru island, though this could take up to a week.

== Phonology ==
The following tables lists the phonemes of Aramba. Graphemes are included in ⟨brackets⟩ where different from phonemic representation.

		Bilabial	Dental	Alveolar	Palatal	Velar	Uvular
Plosive/ Affricate	voiceless	(p)		t		k	
Plosive/ Affricate	voiced	b		d	d͡ʒ ⟨dj⟩	g	
Plosive/ Affricate	prenasal	ᵐb ⟨mb⟩		ⁿd ⟨nd⟩	ⁿd͡ʒ ⟨ndj⟩	ᵑg ⟨ñg⟩	
Nasal		m		n		ŋ ⟨ng⟩	
Fricative		ɸ ⟨f⟩	ð ⟨th⟩	s			χ ⟨x⟩
Trill				r			
Approximant		w			j ⟨y⟩		

Vowels
	Front		Central	Back	
	unrounded	rounded	unrounded	unrounded	rounded
High	i		ʉ ⟨ú⟩		u
Mid	ɛ ⟨e⟩	ø ⟨ó⟩	ə̆ ⟨è⟩	ʌ ⟨a⟩	ɔ ⟨o⟩
Low	æ ⟨é⟩ a ⟨á⟩		ɐ̆ ⟨à⟩		

== Major word classes ==
=== Verbs ===
Alongside with nouns, verbs constitute the only open word class in Aramba. Syntactically, they fall into three subtypes: transitive verbs, (inherently) intransitive verbs and derived intransitive verbs. Transitive verbs like -dren- 'pound' are inflected with a so-called absolutive prefix (which denotes the Undergoer of an action) and an appropriate nominative suffix (denoting the Actor of an action). (For more details on absolutive and nominative affixes) Intransitive verbs like -om- 'live' are also inflected with an absolutive prefix and nominative suffix; however, here it is the prefix that denotes the Actor of the action (S), whereas the nominative suffix remains invariant (i.e. it invariantly marks for third person singular). Derived intransitive verbs like ngadenóg- 'learn' are derived from transitive roots (here: < denóg- 'teach'); they carry a detransitiviser prefix (e.g. nga-) and are suffixed by the same set of nominative suffixes as their transitive counterparts (the only difference being of course that these suffixes now mark for S and not A function). Examples (1)-(3) below illustrate each verbal subtype as outlined above.

thà- dren -ox
it- pound_sago -I
3M.SG.AB- V.C -D.NM.1SG
'I am pounding sago.' (Boevé & Boevé, 1999: 48)

bi thà- om -nda
he he- live -
PN.AB 3M.SG.AB- V.C -D
'He is (living) there.' (Boevé & Boevé, 1999: 49)

gye nga- denóg -óg
I I learn -?
AB.1SG DT.I V.C -D.NM.1SG
'I am learning.' (Boevé & Boevé, 1999: 48)

In addition to subject/object marking, Aramba verb affixes also mark for a complex set of tense/aspect categories as will be outlined in. Furthermore, all verbs occur in two forms referred to as "common root" (C) and "limited action root" (L) (Boevé and Boevé, 1999: 49). For instance, the verb meaning 'pound' has a common root form -dren- 'pound' as well as a limited action root form -dreñg- 'pound'. (The possible differences in meaning will be discussed.) The common root form of most verbs can be used to derive nouns by adding to it the nominal suffix -djó/-dó; e.g. -dren- 'pound' can be nominalized to drendjó meaning 'the act of pounding'.

=== Nouns ===
Just like verbs, Aramba nouns present an open word class. With regard to morphology, nouns may optionally inflect for number, taking the plural suffix -a (e.g. yám-a 'thing-s', táy-a 'ancestor-s'). However, there are a few suppletive plural forms (ewesbe 'women' < ewesba 'woman'; nañgabe 'children/boys' < nañgba 'child/boy'; yemenbe 'girls' < yàmànba 'girl'), and the plural suffix can also not be used on verbal nouns like drendjó (< -dren- 'pound').

Reduplication is used on some (underived) nouns to indicate smallness or definiteness; e.g. the reduplicated form of meñg 'house' is meñg-meñg and means 'small house', reduplication of tày 'cassowary nail' yields tày tày 'finger nail', and the reduplicated form of dúme 'yam house' is dúme-dúme or dúdúme '(this/that) yam house'. Compare this with the reduplication effect on derived (verbal) nouns: fàrdjór 'making noise' > fàfàrdjór 'making much noise'; màryadjór 'walking, going' > màmàryadjór 'strolling around'.

Syntactically, nouns can make up an entire NP and they can be marked by a long list of 'postpositional clitics' (Boevé & Boevé, 1999: 53). Some of these clitics have derivational function (e.g. adjectiviser -dje/-sa 'with the quality of'; genitive -ni 'of') while most others carry case-marking functions (e.g. ergative -o; instrumental -m 'with'; comitative -s 'together with'; human comitative -ro 'together with' benefactive -n 'to, for'; locative -ye 'in'; non-human allative -fo 'towards, to, at the place of, into'; human allative -nmbo 'towards, to'; non-human ablative -fá 'from, away from, from the side of'; human ablative -mba 'from, away from'; purposive -r 'for, (in order) to' etc.).

For examples of adjectivising -dje/-sa. For a discussion of alienable and inalienable possession in Aramba.

=== Adjectives ===
Aramba is one of those languages with a very limited set of underived adjectives. Boevé & Boevé (1999: 61) give the following list of 13 adjectival forms: xanda 'big', ndamba 'small', tefye 'old', dóbne 'young, new', dermber 'long', negwe 'short', denxa 'far', xexa 'close by', gafu 'good', tútéf 'straight', tofo 'first', górye 'after' and wàrfo 'up'.

Compare: In his famous article 'Where have all the adjectives gone?' (Dixon, 1977), Bob Dixon presented the results of a survey carried out on 20 different languages (among them were African, Australian, Mesoamerican and Papuan languages). 17 languages had only small adjective classes and three had morphologically determined subsets within the larger class of adjectives. The size of the classes/subsets in the 20 languages ranged from 7 to 24, with an average of 13. The following adjectival meanings turned out to be (among) the most frequent: 'large' (found in all 20 languages), 'small' (19), 'long' (14), 'short' (15), 'new' (15), 'old' (14), 'good' (13), 'bad' (14), 'black' (13), 'white' (14), 'red' (8), 'raw, green, unripe' (7) (cf. Dixon, 1982: 7).

Based on Boevé & Boevé (1999)'s list of adjectives, Aramba shares 7 out of the 12 cross-linguistically most frequent adjectival meanings, though it lacks 5 of the other most frequent meanings. At the same time, it has 6 adjectives which have different meanings from the ones (by Dixon) listed above, predominantly in the domain of locational and temporal qualification ('far', 'close by', 'up', 'after', 'first').

The Aramba adjectives can generally be distinguished from other word classes in that they do not exhibit any nominal or verbal morphology. Unlike nouns, they cannot make up an entire NP on their own and they cannot be used with the adjectiviser suffix -dje/-sa. It seems that adjectivised nouns often make up for the limited repertoire of underived adjectives:

gye fànye me xuf- rye -endeg xanda sember -dje ngare
1SG there FC - be -P.PG big jealous -ADJR woman
PN.AB ADV PRT 1SG.AB.P.CP- V.IT -NM.SG ADJ N.RD -PP N
'There I was a very jealous woman.' (Boevé & Boevé, 1999: 88)

nda- -ni finam -sa semndjó
us- -GEN. wish -ADJR food
IP.1PL- -PP N -PP N
'Our favorite food.' (Boevé & Boevé, 1999: 88)

=== Pronouns ===
In Aramba, free personal pronouns exhibit the ergative-absolutive case marking pattern, i.e. the unmarked (absolutive) forms are used in intransitive subject (S) and transitive object (O) function (cf. third column in Table 3), while the marked (ergative) form is used in transitive subject (A) function (cf. second column in Table 3). (cf. Boevé & Boevé, 1999: 54)

	Ergative	Absolutive
1sg.	gène	gye
2	bène	be
3	binó/nafo	bi
1pl.	nine	ni
2	bène	be
3	bine/nafa	bi

Table 3: Personal pronouns in Aramba.

gye ya xra- me -g
I will {} go {}
PN-AB ADV DT.FT- V -NOM.SG
'I will go.' (Boevé & Boevé, 1999: 55)

Ñgàw -o tó gye xuf- igen -endeg.
father {} {} me {} carry {}
N -ERG ADV PN.AB 1SG.AB.CP- V -P.CT.SG
'Father carried me.' (Boevé & Boevé, 1999: 55)

gene tó we- yñg -áx
I-ERG. P her- trick -DP.SG
'I tricked her.' (Boevé & Boevé, 1999: 54)

Pronouns can also take the postpositional clitic -we which either functions as intensifier (emphasis) or as reflexive (Actor acting upon himself), e.g. benewe 'you (A) yourselves' or bewe 'you (S) yourselves'. Note that this use of pronouns in context with intensification and reflexivity is analogous to English and its set of pronominal self-forms: He himself had baked the cake (intesifying self-form) vs. He hit himself on the head (reflexive self-form).

=== Demonstratives ===
Aramba has three demonstrative forms: proximal ne 'this', medial fàn 'that' and distal mbe 'that over there'. They can function as demonstrative pronoun (example (9); in example (10), fàn is used with the 'locative' postpositional clitic -ye) or as demonstrative determiner (see example (11)):

naf- bán -o fàn ta- mndj -áx
her son -ERG that - marry -DP
IP.3SG N -ERG DM.AB DT.PF- V -NM.SG
'Her son married that (girl).' (Boevé & Boevé, 1999: 60)

gene tó fàn -ye thàfa- rameñg -endeg agya
I past that -in - watch_over - crocodile
ERG.1ST ADV DM. PP AB.3SG.M.P.CP- V -NM.SG.P.PG N.AB
'There (in that place) I was watching over the crocodile.' (Boevé & Boevé, 1999: 60)

fàn ewesba tó fàn xanda-xanda -o de- rid -áx
that woman p that old_man -ERG she- pass_by -DP
DM N ADV DM N -ERG AB.3F.SG- V.L -NM.SG
'That old man had passed by that old woman.' (Boevé & Boevé, 1999: 60)

=== Quantifiers ===
This class includes numeral and non-numeral expressions. The numeral system takes the base 6 and involves the following forms:

ngámbi	'one'
yànbaru	'two'
yenówe	'three'
asàr	'four'
tambnoy	'five'
nimbo	'six'
feté	'36'
tarumba	'6x36'
ndamno	'6x tarumba'
wermeke}}	'6x ndamno'

There is also (a more English-oriented way of) counting with the base of five, involving the composite form ngámbi mbày brú 'five (lit. one hand part)'. Thus, for 'ten' you get yànbaru mbày brú '(lit.) two hands parts', for 'fifteen' you get yenówe mbày brú '(lit.) three hands parts', or for '24' you get asàr mbày brú asàr '(lit.) four hands parts (and) four'. Non-numeral quantifiers include nga 'one, some, another', xàyo xusi / bedjidjó meme 'uncountable', yeyenówe 'not much', brámwe 'all', ñgówe 'many', dof-dof 'many' and tús 'plenty'. (cf. Boevé and Boevé, 1999: 63)

=== Adverbs ===
Adverbs are uninflected forms which are never governed by a postposition, and do not function as arguments or predicates in single clauses. In addition to degree adverbs like xanda 'very', ndamba 'somewhat' and fefe}} 'really, very', there are also a number of adverbs indicating tense, aspect or mood: tó 'past tense', ya 'future tense', wàrye 'still', xut 'again', añgu 'no matter', mo 'irrealis', wamo 'as if', yamo 'would, should', manamo 'counterfactual', xaxe 'negative' and úró 'prohibitive'. (cf. Boevé and Boevé, 1999: 64)

=== Conjunctions ===
Aramba has coordinate conjunctions and subordinate conjunctions (complementizers). Coordinate conjunctions functioning at noun phrase as well as clause/sentence level are e 'and' and o 'or'; the expressions mba 'and/then', bi 'but', wati 'and' and xa 'and/then', on the other hand, only function on clause/sentence level. The subclass of complementizers includes mánà 'when, if', mbàndámàr 'until', and interrogative pronouns me 'whichever', mende 'like what', muma 'from where', manda 'wherever', mumba 'whatever' and múme 'how big'. (Boevé and Boevé, 1999: 65–69)

=== Possession ===
Aramba makes a formal distinction between alienable and inalienable possession. The possessive relationship holding between a possessor noun and a possessed noun is commonly marked by the postpositional clitic -ni. Consider the examples below.

ngámbi nañgba -ni mám wàdji tror
one child -GEN. wallaby bush_string vine
Qt N -pp N N N
'One boy's wallaby bush string.' (Boevé & Boevé, 1999: 63)

fàn yànmbaru ngarú -ni djó
that two man -GEN. name
DM QT N -PP N
'The names of those two men.' (Boevé & Boevé, 1999: 111)

Abram -ni màran, Abram muma thra- m -áx
Abram -GEN. family, Abram from_where it- go -DP
NPR -PP N NPR DM 3SG.M.AB.FT- V -NM
'Abram's family where Abram came from.' (Boevé & Boevé, 1999: 59)

In addition, Boevé and Boevé (1999: 59) observe the following subset of so-called inalienable nouns in the language: -ngam 'mother', -ngàwa 'father', -tabú 'father', -tér 'friend', -bidj 'husband', -begend 'wife', -for 'daughter, -bán 'son', -gasi 'name sake'. These nouns obligatorily take the inalienable noun prefix (see Tab. 4) without the possessive postpositional clitic -ni, which is used with alienable nouns.

1sg.	2	3	1pl.	2	3
ndu-	mbu-	naf-	nda-	mba-	nafa-

Table 4: Inalienable noun prefixes varying according to person and number.

xaxexa naf- ñgam -n dúwe- fes -áx
not his- mother -to she- tell -DP
NEG_CJ IP.3SG- N -PP AB.3F.SG.ST.PF- V.L -NM.SG
'He did not tell it to his mother.' (Boevé & Boevé, 1999: 59)

ara, ndu- nñgán gafu wàrye nà- rye
? my friend good still you- be
Q IP.PP N ADJ ADV 2SG.AB- V.C.IT
'(Say) My friend, are you still okay?' (Boevé & Boevé, 1999: 69)

The list of inalienable nouns suggests that the formal marking of inalienable possession is restricted to nouns denoting social (and biological) kinship relations. Nevertheless, the examples below demonstrate that by no means all semantically inalienable nouns are formally marked as such.

nga ngarú -ni yàmanba togye
one man -GEN. girl little
QT N -PP N ADJ
'Somebody's little daughter.' Boevé & Boevé, 1999: 62)

nduni nañgàn -a yamo ye- sàr -àx
my younger_sibling -PL {} - hit -PT
IP.1SG N -PL PT-IR 2/3PL.ABS- V -NM.1SG
'I used to hit my small brothers and sisters.' (Boevé & Boevé, 1999: 132)

Yet another way of marking possessive relationships is demonstrated by the following example (19); here the otherwise locative postpositional clitic -ye is employed as possessive marker. Note that the possessed noun bidj 'husband' belongs to our above list of (formally marked) inalienable nouns.

Yúryé -ye bidj be xa- n- mbraxend
yúryé {} husband you - {} this_way-say_loud
NPR -PP N 2ABS DT.IMP- DIR- V.L
'Yúrye's husband, you say it aloud (towards me)!' (Boevé & Boevé, 1999: 77)

== Verbal morphology ==
As already indicated in, Aramba verbs occur in two forms: 'common root' (C) and 'limited action root' (L) (cf. §5.1). To these roots, obligatory prefixes and suffixes are attached. The verb morphology is unusual in that it displays a mixture of ergative-absolutive marking and nominative-accusative marking. Tense/Aspect marking in Aramba is rather complex (cf. §5.2).

=== Common root vs. Limited action root ===
The limited action root of a verb is used when there is only one instance of the action, when the action implied is restricted in time, intensity or amount or when the number of participants in the event is limited. The common root, on the other hand, implies no such restrictions. Consider examples (20) and (21) involving the limited action root -fes- and the common root -fex- of the verb meaning 'tell':

maf -o mba -n sa- fes ∅
who? {} you -to you- tell {}
{} -ERG IP -PP 2PL.PF.ST- V-L 3SG.NM
'Who told you two?' (Boevé & Boevé, 1999: 15)

maf -o mba -n safa- fex -o
who? {} you -to you- tell {}
{} -ERG IP -PP 2PL.P.CP.ST V-C -3SG.NM
'Who told you (many)?' (Boevé & Boevé, 1999: 16)

The limited action root also serves as a stylistic device in certain discourse contexts, e.g. when issuing a command or directive. Compare example (22) with the limited action root -yaf- 'help' with (23) where the common root -yax- 'help' is being used.

ndu -n xwa- yaf
me -for - help
IP.1SG -PP 1SG.FT.ST- V-L
'Help me please!' (polite, with small thing) (Boevé & Boevé, 1999: 16)

ndu -n xwa- yax -àx
me -for - help -POS
IP.1SG -PP 1SG.FT.ST- V-C -IMP.ST
'Help me!' (strong command) (Boevé & Boevé, 1999: 16)

Unlike the common verb root, the limited action root is not compatible with the (optional) intensifier suffix -or and the suffix encoding progressive or durative aspect (-endeg / -ox) (more in). Examples (24)-(27) again demonstrate the different uses of limited action root and common root, including the use of the intensifier suffix -or in (27).

thà- djib -áx
it- throw -DP
3M.SG.AB- V-L -NM.SG
'He threw it (one thing) away.'

sa- djib -áx
- throw -DP
2/3PL.AB- V-L -NM.SG
'He threw them (two things) away.'

ye- djibr -áx
- throw -DP
2/3PL.AB- V-C -NM.SG
'He threw them (more than two) away.'

ye- djibr -or -áx
- throw -INT -DP
2/3PL.AB- V-C -SFX -NM.SG
'He threw them (many things) away.' (Boevé & Boevé, 1999: 19)

=== Undergoer/Actor and Tense/Aspect marking on the verb ===
In construction, a verb is always prefixed and suffixed by Subject and Object (agreement) markers, which respectively mark the Undergoer and Actor of the action referred to by the verb. In the case of transitive verbs, the subject markers are suffixed to the verb root (cf. nominative suffixes), while the object markers are prefixed (cf. absolutive prefixes). In the case of intransitive verbs, the subject is marked via the same set of prefixes which serve as object markers with transitive verbs (i.e. the Undergoer of the transitive verb is specified by the same set of prefixes as the Actor of the intransitive verb; ergo 'absolutive prefixes'); in addition, an invariant nominative suffix is attached to the verb root. Another marking pattern is observed with derived intransitive verbs. Here a detransitivising prefix is added to the transitive verb root and the transitive subject markers are also used as intransitive subject markers (i.e. the Actors of transitive and derived intransitive verbs are marked by the same set of suffixes; ergo 'nominative suffixes'). Hence Boevé & Boevé (1999: 15)'s remark on the hybrid nature of (what they call) "the verbal case-marking system": when tracing the A/O and S marking of transitive and (inherently) intransitive verbs, the marking pattern is ergative-absolutive; when comparing the marking pattern of transitive and derived intransitive verbs, the pattern is nominative-accusative.

The Undergoer/Actor affixes carry information about Person (1, 2, 3), Number (sg., pl.), sometimes Gender (3.sg.m/3.sg.f), Tense (distant past, present, future), Aspect (perfective, imperfective, progressive) and, in some cases, spatial deixis (locative 'over there'). When talking about events as being located in the past, present or future (tense) and when talking about these events from different viewpoints (aspect), different combinatorics between Undergoer prefixes and Actor suffixes apply. Table 5 below is a very simplified version of this combined Undergoer/Actor- and Tense/Aspect-marking verb inflection system. It is representative of the inflections on transitive and intransitive verbs. The prefix and suffix slots in Table 5 are the appropriate forms for third person singular referents (note: the prefixes are also specified for gender, here: masculine). Note that for intransitive verbs, the Actor is always indicated via the verbal prefix set; the suffixes are invariant but morphologically they correspond to the third person singular Actor suffix of transitive verbs. The suffix slots that are zero-marked for the person/number value 'third person singular' (e.g. No. 3 and 5) are not necessarily zero-marked for all other person/number values (of course, this only applies to transitive verbs); e.g. for 'third person plural' you get -a for both suffix slots in No. 3 and 5. Also note that the verb root may occur in two different forms: 'common root' (C) or 'limited action root' (L). In particular, the selection of verb root has an effect on the durative vs. non-durative reading of the action referred to. And finally, note that whenever we have past tense or future tense reference, the inflected verb form may be preceded by a time adverb: tó 'past' or yá 'future'.

No.	Adverb	Prefix	Root	Suffix	T/A Translation	Comment
1	tó	thà-	C	-áx	X happened	Distant Past
2	tó	thàf-	C	-endeg	X was happening	Distant Past Progressive
3	(tó/yá)	thà-	C	-ø	X happens, X just happened, X is about to happen	Present, Recent Past: today, Near Future
4		thà-	C	-o	X is happening	Present Progressive
5	yá	thrà-	C	-ø	X will happen	Future
6	yá	thrà-	C	-o	X will be happening	Future Progressive: between now and distant future
7	tó	thàf-	C	-or -ox	X happened over there	Locative Distant Past
8		thà-	C	-or-o	X happens over there	Locative Present
9	yá	thrà-	C	-or-o	X will happen over there	Locative Future
10	tó	thà-	L	-áx	X has happened	Distant Past Perfect: between a few weeks and a long time ago
11	tó	thà-	L	-ø	X has finished happening	Recent Past Perfect: between a few weeks ago and now
12	yá	thrà-	L	-ø	X will have happened	Future Perfect
13	tó	thà-	L	-ox	X has happened over there	Locative Distant Past Perfect
14		thà-	L	-o	X has just happened over there	Locative Recent Past Perfect
15	yá	thrà-	L	-o	X will have happened over there	Locative Future Perfect

Table 5: Tense/Aspect marking on transitive and intransitive verb roots. (B & B, 1999: Appendix A, B)

Some further remarks on the verb forms in Table 5. Altogether, there does not seem to be an easy way of generalizing over the different tense/aspect markings in Arammba. Nevertheless, some tendencies can be stated:

- Future Tense is always indicated through the Future prefix set including thrà- (cf. No. 5, 6, 9, 12 and 15); except for Near Future where the future time reference is solely carried by the time adverb yá.
- The set of prefixes that include thà- (referred to as Imperfective by Boevé & Boevé, 1999: 32) is almost always used in context with Present Tense (cf. No. 3, 4 and 8; note that thà- also occurs in No. 10, 11, 13 and 14 in construction with the limited action root; however, Boevé & Boevé (1999: 36) show that it is part of a different prefix paradigm from the one used on common verb roots; they refer to this prefix set as Perfect), but it also occurs on the C-root in context with Distant Past (cf. No. 1), perhaps with the implication that the action is still relevant to the present.
- The set of prefixes that include thàf- always have past reference (cf. No. 2 and 7) and Boevé and Boevé (1999: 33) refer to this prefix set as Past Completive.
- The suffix set including -áx (cf. No. 1 and 10) always has Distant Past reference (i.e. the -áx set is identical to C and L verb roots). Boevé & Boevé (1999: 37) refer to this suffix set as Distant Past.
- The set of suffixes that is zero-marked for third person singular (cf. No. 3, 5, 11 and 12) is always related to recent aast, present or future. In this context, the differences in meaning with the same pre- and suffixes occurring on either the common root or the limited action root: compare the C-forms in No. 3 and 5 with the L-forms in No. 11 and 12. The C-forms allow a durative, non-completive reading, while the L-forms always imply non-duration and completion.
- There are two sets of suffixes which never occur with the limited action root; namely the set including -endeg (No. 2) and the one including -o (No. 4 and 6). Both are used on common verb roots in connection with Progressive Aspect (Past and Present Progressive; hence (Boevé & Boevé, 1999: Appendix A) refer to them as Past Progressive and Durative suffixes, respectively). This incompatibility again underlines the non-durative semantics of the limited action root.
- For the Locative Tenses, both C- and L-roots are inflected with suffix sets including -ox and -o, respectively (cf. No. 7-9 and 13–15). However, only the C-root can take the intensifier suffix -or- which is inserted between verb root and locative suffix (cf. No. 7-9).
- And finally, the prefix sets on transitive verbs (marking the Undergoer) are divided into two classes: weak and strong. The weak prefix forms mark the arguments as being singular or paucal in number, whereas the strong prefix form is either used to indicate plurality ('many') or to mark the semantic role of the object referent as Recipient or Beneficiary. The third person singular prefixes given in Table 5 are of the weak form (i.e. singular).

In the following, we provide some examples of transitive and intransitive verb forms in complete sentences. All of the verb forms below have Distant Past reference. The person/number values for the Actor referents vary in some cases, but nevertheless the suffix form is always -áx since it specifies for all three persons in the singular (however, it would be -áxe for first person plural and -áy for second/third person plural). On the other hand, the Undergoer/Actor prefixes are different for each person/number specification. Table 6 provides the relevant prefix set from which they are taken (again, Boevé & Boevé call them Imperfective prefixes; also see Table 5, No. 1).

		Weak	Strong
Sg.	1	wà-	wa-
	2	nà-	na-
	3m	thà-/thè-	tha-/the-
	3f	we-	wé-
Pl.	1	ne-	né-
	2/3	ya-/ye-	yá-/yé-
Intr			we-

Table 6: Imperfective verb prefixes for O and S function. (Boevé & Boevé, 1999: 33)

Distant Past with transitive verb root:

tó ñgànd ñgànd -fa tó thà- s -or -áx
PAST mud mud -from PAST it- take -INT -DP
ADV N N -PP ADV 3M.SG.AB- V.C -INT -NM.SG
'I dragged it out of the mud.' (Boevé & Boevé, 1999: 38)

ye- djibr -áx
- throw -DP
2/3PL.AB- V-C -NM.SG
'He threw them away.' (Boevé & Boevé, 1999: 19)

fànye tó yawàn -o ne- n- saxurax -áx
there past canoo -ERG us- here- leave -DP
ADV ADV N -ERG 1PL.AB- DIR.- V-C -NM.SG
'There the car left us.' (Boevé & Boevé, 1999: 26)

gene tó we- iñg -áx fànsa
I past she- trick -DP thus
ERG.1SG ADV 3F.SG.AB- V.C -NM.SG ADV
'I tricked her as follows: ...' (Boevé & Boevé, 1999: 32)

Distant Past with (inherently) intransitive verb root:

nda -ni táy -a mana ye- om -áx
us -GEN. ancestor -SUF when - live -DP
IP.1PL -PP N -PL CJS 3PL.AB- V.C -NM
'When our ancestors lived...' (Boevé & Boevé, 1999: 52)

ngarú fàn we- ya -wáx Muwa -r
man those plenty- go -DP Muwa -to/for
N DM 3.AB- V -NM.SG. N.PRO -PP
'Those (many) men went to Muwa.' (Boevé & Boevé, 1999: 43)

As the examples above also show, the subject referent is sometimes expressed only by the subject marker on the verb (e.g. example (28) and (29)), whereas in other cases it is additionally expressed by a free Noun Phrase (see bracketed NPs in examples (30) to (33)).

== Bibliography ==
- Boevé, Alma, Boevé, Marco. 1999. Grammar Essentials of the Arammba Language. [unpublished manuscript].
- Boevé, Alma and Marco Boevé. 2003. Arammba Grammar. Unpublished m.s.
- Dixon, R.M.W. 1977. Where have all the adjectives gone? In: R.M.W. Dixon Where have all the adjectives gone? and other essays in Semantics and Syntax. (1982). Berlin: Mouton de Gruyter. 1-62.
