= Nama language (disambiguation) =

The Nama language is a variety of the Khoekhoe language of Namibia, spoken by the Nama people.

Nama may also refer to:

- The Nama language (Papuan) variety of the Nambu languages of Papua New Guinea
- The Nama/Dama dialect of the Tigon language of Cameroon

== See also ==
- Litzlitz language of Vanuatu, also known as Naman
