= Trans-Fly =

Trans-Fly may refer to:

== Linguistics ==
- Trans-Fly languages
- Eastern Trans-Fly languages
- Trans-Fly–Bulaka River languages

== Geography ==
- Trans-Fly savanna and grasslands

== See also ==
- Fly River
- Western Province (Papua New Guinea)
- Merauke Regency
