= Maklew language =

Language in Papua

Maklew
- Makleunga
- Region: South Papua
- Native speakers: (undated figure of 120)
- Language family: Bulaka River: Maklew

Language codes
- ISO 639-3: mgf
- Glottolog: makl1246
- ELP: Maklew

Maklew (alternative names include Maklèw, Makleu, and Makaleo) is a language of the proposed Trans-Fly – Bulaka River family in South Papua, Indonesia. It is known to be spoken in Welbuti village, Merauke Regency. It is thought to be closely related to the Yelmek Language.

The Maklew language is thought to be spoken in the Woboyo (Woboyu) and Dodalim villages, but this is unconfirmed. Some Maklew-speaking Welbuti villagers claim that the language is also spoken with exactly the same dialect in the villages of Bibikem and Wanam, although these villages are notably listed as Yelmek-speaking by linguistics who have studied the two languages. According to surveyors, few people still speak the Maklew language. Adults in the Welbuti village claim that while the children can still understand Maklew, they speak Indonesian and make fun of adults for using Maklew. This has caused concern among the village adults who are worried that the language could soon die out. The language also faces outside threats such as heavy influence from the Marind Language, as does Yelmek. Again, this is of great concern to the adults, who are reportedly interested in pursuing the idea of preserving their language, although it is still unknown if enough educated people can be found to help start a language program.

== Phonology ==
Drabbe (1950: 549) gives 15 consonants and 8 vowels for Maklèw as follows:

Consonants
		Labial	Alveolar	Palatal	Velar	Glottal
Nasal		m	n		ŋ	
Plosive	voiceless	p	t		k	
Plosive	prenasalized	ᵐb	ⁿd		ᵑɡ	
Fricative		f	s			h
Approximant		w	l	j		

Vowels
	Front	Central	Back
Close	i	y*	u
Close-Mid	e		o
Open-Mid	ɛ	ə**	
Open		a	

⠀*It is unclear if "y" on the chart is the fronted /y/, central /ʉ/, or even close-mid /ø/.

⠀**/ə/ is sometimes used to break up consonant clusters.
