= Guntai language =

Yam language spoken in New Guinea

Guntai
- Warta Thuntai
- Region: Western Province, Papua New Guinea
- Native speakers: 350 (2003)
- Language family: Trans-Fly – Bulaka River?: Yam; Tonda; Guntai

Language codes
- ISO 639-3: gnt
- Glottolog: gunt1241

Guntai, or Warta Thuntai, is a Papuan language of New Guinea. Guntai-speaking villages are located along eastern banks of the Bensbach River.
