= Yei (disambiguation) =

Yei is a city in South Sudan.

YEI or Yei may also refer to:

- Yei or yeii, is a Navajo or Zuni deity-like spirit often portrayed in artworks such as sandpaintings or weavings
- Yei River State, a state in South Sudan
- Yei language, a Papuan language of Papua New Guinea
- YEI, the IATA airport code for Yenişehir Airport
- Quasipaa yei, a species of frog in the family Ranidae
- Yei Theodora Ozaki, an early 20th-century translator of Japanese short stories and fairy tales

== See also ==
- Yey (disambiguation)
