= Ngkolmpu Kanum language =

Language

Ngkolmpu
- Ngkontar
- Region: New Guinea
- Ethnicity: Kanum
- Native speakers: 100 (2018)
- Language family: Trans-Fly – Bulaka River?: Yam; Tonda; Ngkolmpu
- Dialects: Ngkâlmpw (Ngkontar); Bädi

Language codes
- ISO 639-3: Either: kcd – Ngkâlmpw Kanum khd – Bädi Kanum
- Glottolog: ngka1236

Ngkolmpu Kanum, or Ngkontar, is part of a dialect chain in the Yam family spoken by the Kanum people of New Guinea. The Ngkâlmpw (Ngkontar) and moribund Bädi varieties have limited mutual intelligibility may be considered distinct languages.

== Dialects ==
Languages spoken by the Kanum have variously been referred to as Ngkâlmpw Kanum, Enkelembu, Kenume, and Knwne. Carroll describes three varieties forming a dialect chain. Ngkolmpu is divided into Ngkontar and the moribund variety Baedi (Bädi).

== Phonology ==
=== Consonants ===
Ngkolmpu Kanum has 15 consonant phonemes (plus two marginal phonemes) at three points of articulation: bilabial, coronal, and velar. Prenasalized voiceless stops and fricatives contrast with voiceless and nasal realizations, which is typologically unusual. The orthography is enclosed in angle brackets.

		Bilabial	Coronal	Velar
Nasal		m ⟨m⟩	n ⟨n⟩	
Plosive	voiceless	p ⟨p⟩	t ⟨t⟩	k ⟨k⟩
Plosive	prenasal	ᵐp ⟨mp⟩	ⁿt ⟨nt⟩	ᵑk ⟨ngk⟩
Plosive	voiced	b ⟨b⟩		(ɡ) ⟨g⟩
Fricative	plain		s ⟨s⟩	
Fricative	prenasal		ⁿs ⟨ns⟩,⟨nc⟩	
Trill			r ⟨r⟩	
Liquid			l ⟨l⟩	
Glide		w ⟨w⟩	j ⟨y⟩	

== Grammar ==
The Ngkolmpu (Ngkâlmpw) Kanum variety is notable for its complex verbal inflection and tendency to distribute grammatical features throughout an utterance, referred to as distributed exponence.
