= Bulaka River languages =

Papuan languages

Bulaka River
- Yelmek–Maklew; Jabga
- Geographic distribution: Tubang and Ilwayab subdistricts, Bulaka River watershed, Merauke Regency, South Papua
- Ethnicity: Jab (Yab)
- Linguistic classification: One of the world's primary language families
- Subdivisions: Yelmek; Maklew

Language codes
- ISO 639-3: –
- Glottolog: bula1259
- Map: The Bulaka River languages of New Guinea The Bulaka River languages Trans–New Guinea languages Other Papuan languages Austronesian languages Uninhabited

The Bulaka River languages are a pair of closely related Papuan languages, Yelmek and Maklew, on the Bulaka River in Indonesian South Papua. They are ethnically Yab (Jab); their speech is Yabga (Jabga).

== Languages ==
Yelmek is spoken west of Merauke Regency, between the Digul River and Mbian River, (from north to south) in the villages of Wanam, Bibikem, Woboyo, and Dodalim.

Maklew is spoken in Welbuti village. The former two villages are located in Ilwayab district, and the latter three in Tubang district.

== Classification ==
The two languages are transparently related.

Ross (2005) tentatively included them in the proposed Trans-Fly – Bulaka River family, but Usher, who reconstructs that family, does not connect Bulaka River to any other language family.

== Proto-language ==
=== Phonology ===
Usher (2014) reconstructs the consonant inventory as follows. Although the modern inventories of Yelmek and Maklew are nearly identical, they lack a one-to-one correspondence. Maklew in particular has been heavily influenced by Marind, and participates in a number of sound changes that occurred in that language. Usher posits:

- j for Yelmek j ~ Maklew s (→ [z] in the Jab dialect of Yelmek; also found in loans from Marind /j/, which in some dialects is [hʲ])
- w for Yelmek w ~ Maklew h (also found in loans from Marind /w/, which in some dialects is [hʷ])
- ɣ for Yelmek ŋ ~ Maklew h (→ [g] in the Jab dialect of Yelmek; Makelew /h/ also found in loans from Marind /ɣ/, which in the central dialects becomes [h])

and, in loan words, mostly from Marind,

- s for Yelmek t ~ Maklew s (→ [ts] is Jab).

In addition, there is a set of correspondences between alveolars in Yelmek and velars in Maklew (n~ŋ, t~k, d~g). Usher transcribes these as a series of palatal consonants (*ɲ *c *ɟ), but this is merely a typographic convenience. The phonetic forms are not easily recoverable, but most instances (8 out of 10) are followed by *e, suggesting that there was a vocal component. Usher suggests that *ɲ *c *ɟ might actually have been *niV *tiV *diV or *ŋiV *kiV *giV, none of which occur in the reconstructions despite the high frequency of the sequence *iV otherwise. The expected sequences *itV and *ikV also do not occur, so it's possible that *ɲ *c *ɟ reflect all three of these series, rather than a fourth place of articulation.

*m	*n	*ɲ (= *{n|ŋ}i/_V?)	*ŋ
*p	*t	*c (= *{t|k}i/_V?)	*k
*b	*d	*ɟ (= *{d|g}i/_V?)	*g
	[*s]		
*w	*l	*j	*ɣ

*i		*u
*e	(*ə)	*o
	*a	

The reconstruction of *ə is not firm, at least partly because the transcribed data is often unreliable.

There are vowel sequences of *iV and *uV. These might have been reconstructed as **jV and **wV, with no vowel sequences in the proto-language, but that analysis would require changing *w and *j in the consonant table above to **β and **ʝ, distinct from **w and **j, resulting in a larger set of consonants and an odd inventory of fricatives.

=== Pronouns ===
Usher (2020) reconstructs the pronouns as:

	sg	pl
1	*ŋ[e]l	*ŋag
2	*au (?)	*ale (?)
3	*eb	*em[e]l

=== Lexicon ===
Proto-Bulaka River lexical reconstructions by Usher (2014) are:

gloss	Proto-Bulaka River
afraid	*oio
ankle	*boto
ant	*kani[a/e]
ashes	*kab
ask about	*lig(-)
ask for	*liw
back	*uele
bamboo	*biol
banana	*okal
bandicoot	*jowoli
bathe	*jale
be (future)	*ŋaiak
be hungry	*ɣi
beach	*uelo
big	*bala-
bitter	*ipa
blood	*ewlek[e]
blunt/dull	*map
body/chest	*agal
bone/shin	*pu
branch	*kaka
breadfruit	*joko
break (rope)	*[a]ŋeme
break (wood)	*maɣe
breast	*momo
breath	*waku
bush/forest	*golu
canoe	*imo
cassowary	*owi
child/offspring	*iaŋ
coconut	*mi[a/o]
coconut shell	*apina
cold	*ioɣ[a]
cough/sneeze	*ŋot[o]
crocodile	*iaua[ŋ]
crooked/turn	*meŋ
dark/black	*ɟewi
(day)light	*owo
deep	*dam
dig	*k[o]uak
dog	*num
dream	*ŋeɣe
drink/suck	*[a]ŋ[e]
dry	*ua-
ear	*opo-kolo
earthquake	*ŋ[a/o]ɣum[o]
enemy	*kui
excrement	*de, *gauo
eye/face	*opo
feather	*papa
fence	*molo
fire	*ace
fish	*dem, *dam
fly (n.)	*uoli
fly (v.)	*mu
foot/leg	*uodo
forehead	*cule
fruit	*noma
go up	*ukal
good/true	*ŋama-
grab/hold	*[a]ɣep[e]
grandparent	*kaga
hard	*kakeie
hear	*[i]ŋe
hit/smash	*pliaɣ
hole	*kolo
hot/sharp	*dimo
house	*ebi
husband	*ebVwe
imperative	*ia-
intransitive	*ŋo-
kill	*gul-
knowledge	*uowka
kunai grass	*uoka
laugh	*ŋuw
leaf	*op
lie down/sleep	*ku
light (weight)	*popu-
lightning	*melVm
lime/white	*mVlino
long	*tipu-
louse	*dobuna
mountain	*uomal
mouth/door	*uwo
mucus	*em
name	*ŋaɟel[e]
neck	*ua[n/l]
negative	*ma
net	*apija
new	*ŋaluo-
night	*ui
now/today	*ŋop[i]
oblique	*el ~ *ol
old (thing)	*poto-
older sibling	*ɲena
one	*ŋuka
path	*came
penis	*mu
person	*ŋuwa
pig	*milom
plait	*ɣo
plant (v.)	*[e]ule
possessive	*a[u]-
rain	*maŋ
rib(s)	*mel
ripe	*ŋewe
rope	*del
run/run away	*jeme
sago stems	*buka
saliva	*wVlo
see	*[a]b[e]
shoot	*to
short	*tama-
sick/ill	*dogo
sit	*ma[n/d]
sleep	*opula
small	*wVti-
smoke	*acaja
snake	*gumolo
soft/weak	*ieg(ieg)
sole	*mulo
sour	*[a]bowol
speech	*gaga
spine	*ieŋo
steal	*ɟepe
stone	*mat[e]
stone axe	*iebu
straight	*amom
suffix on adj.	*pa-
sugarcane	*belam
sun/sky	*[a/o]limu
swim	*ce
tame/orphan	*ŋomo-
taro	*muj
tendon	*ouo
testicle	*oko
thigh	*c[a]pe, *cepe
throat	*bila
thumb/big toe	*ege-
tongue	*nepla
tooth	*kal
torch	*ual[e]no
tree/wood	*doio
upright	*daŋ
urine	*oŋo
voice	*wai[a]
wait	*[a]lpo
wallaby	*doki
wash	*uw
water	*iu
weep/cry	*ŋom
widow	*boi
wife	*kepi[ŋ/ɣ][e]
wing	*mama
woman/female	*iowa-
younger sibling	*uobia
