= Kanum people =

Kanum
Kanume
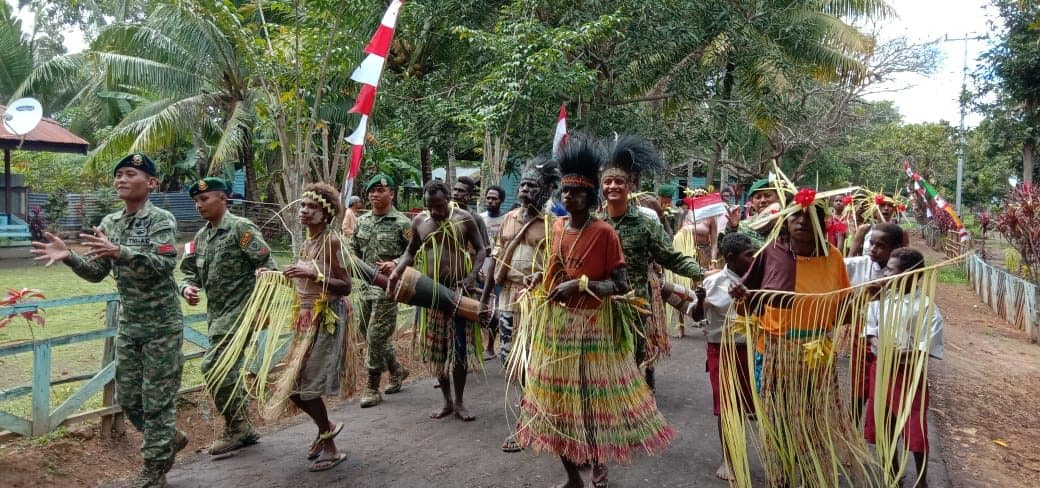
- Kanum people with TNI soldiers at the Indonesia–Papua New Guinea border.

Total population
- ~1.000

Regions with significant populations
- Indonesia (South Papua), Papua New Guinea (Western Province)

Languages
- Smerki, Nggarna, Ngkolmpu Kanum, Barkari dialect, Bädi dialect, Indonesian, Tok Pisin, English

Religion
- Christianity (majority), Indigenous beliefs

Related ethnic groups
- Marind and Yei

Kanum people (Kanume) are an ethnic group that inhabit the border area of Merauke Regency in South Papua and Western Province in Papua New Guinea. The Kanum are considered a subgroup of the Marind, but they have their own language, Kanum, that belongs to the Yam language family. This language is closer to the Yei language and other tribes in Papua New Guinea than to the Marind language, which is spoken by the largest ethnic group in Merauke.

The Kanum are one of the tribes living in the Wasur National Park area. Within the Kanum people, there are several clans, including: Mbanggu, Ndimar, Ndiken, Sanggra, Mayuwa, Gelambu, and Kul.

== People ==
The Kanum people are spread across several villages along the Indonesia-Papua New Guinea border, particularly in Merauke Regency. In Indonesia, the Kanum tribe has a vast indigenous territory within the Wasur National Park with a topography of swamps, forests, and savanna plains. The Kanum people hunt animals like wild boars, deer, and wallabies using traditional methods with bows and arrows, spears, and machetes.

The Kanum people also collect plants from nature, such as sago palms, and cultivate tubers like lesser yams (Kanum called it nai); these two plants serve as their staple foods. Additionally, Kanum utilizes eucalyptus wood, which is abundant in the Wasur National Park. They distill the plant for oil and then sell it to other regions to boost their economy.

The Kanum people are scattered throughout the Sota and Naukenjerai districts in Merauke Regency. The Kanum people can be divided into smaller groups based on their languages. For example, speakers of the Kanum Smarky live in Rawa Biru, speakers of the Kanum Sota live in Sota, speakers of the Ngkâlmpw or Ngkalembu/Ngkolmpu live in Yanggandur, and speakers of the Barkari live in Kondo. The Kanum languages are classified as endangered because there are only few speakers. In 2024, only 80 people spoke the Smarky, while 100 people spoke the Kanum Sota. There is also the Kanum Badi language, with only 10 remaining speakers.

The Kanum people also live in Papua New Guinea and still maintain frequent contact with the Kanum tribe in Indonesia. They often visit the Sota Border Crossing Post (PLBN) on foot or by bicycle for tens of kilometers from their villages to buy groceries and sell agricultural products such as fish and hunted game. They can easily enter Indonesian territory with cross-border documents. The Kanum people from Papua New Guinea are also frequently invited to participate in certain celebrations in Sota.

== See also ==
- Marind people
