= NQN =

NQN or nqn may refer to:

- NQN, the IATA code for Presidente Perón International Airport, Argentina
- nqn, the ISO 639-3 code for Nen language (Papuan), Western Province, Papua New Guinea
