= Taeme language =

Pahoturi language

Taeme
- Tame
- Region: Morehead Rural LLG, Western Province, Papua New Guinea
- Native speakers: 834 (2018)
- Language family: Trans-Fly: Pahoturi; Taeme

Language codes
- ISO 639-3: –
- Glottolog: tame1238

Taeme (or Tame) is a Pahoturi language spoken in Kondobol ward, northeast Morehead Rural LLG, Western Province, Papua New Guinea. It is spoken by 834 people in Taeme village (8.046723°S 141.525347°E), Kondobol ward, Morehead Rural LLG.

Taeme is most closely related to Idi.
