= Smerki language =

Yam language spoken in Indonesia

Smerki
- Kanum
- Region: Southeast Merauke Regency, Indonesia
- Ethnicity: Kanum Smarky
- Native speakers: 150 (2018)
- Language family: Trans-Fly – Bulaka River?: Yam; Tonda; Smerki
- Dialects: Bârkâli; Smärki

Language codes
- ISO 639-3: kxq
- Glottolog: smar1235
- ELP: Smärky Kanum

Smerki is a Yam language spoken in Rawu Biru, Tomer, Tomerau, and Yakiw in southeast Merauke Regency, Indonesia. Bârkâli (Barkari) and Smärki may be distinct enough to count as separate languages. The Tamer language is closely related.
