= Namat =

Namat may refer to:

- Namat language
- Namat Abdullah
