= Agob languages =

Pahoturi language group of Papua New Guinea

Agöb
- Dabu
- Native to: Papua New Guinea
- Region: Morehead Rural LLG, Western Province
- Native speakers: (2,400 cited 2000 census)
- Language family: Trans-Fly: Pahoturi; Agöb
- Dialects: Agob; Ende; Kawam

Language codes
- ISO 639-3: kit
- Glottolog: agob1244
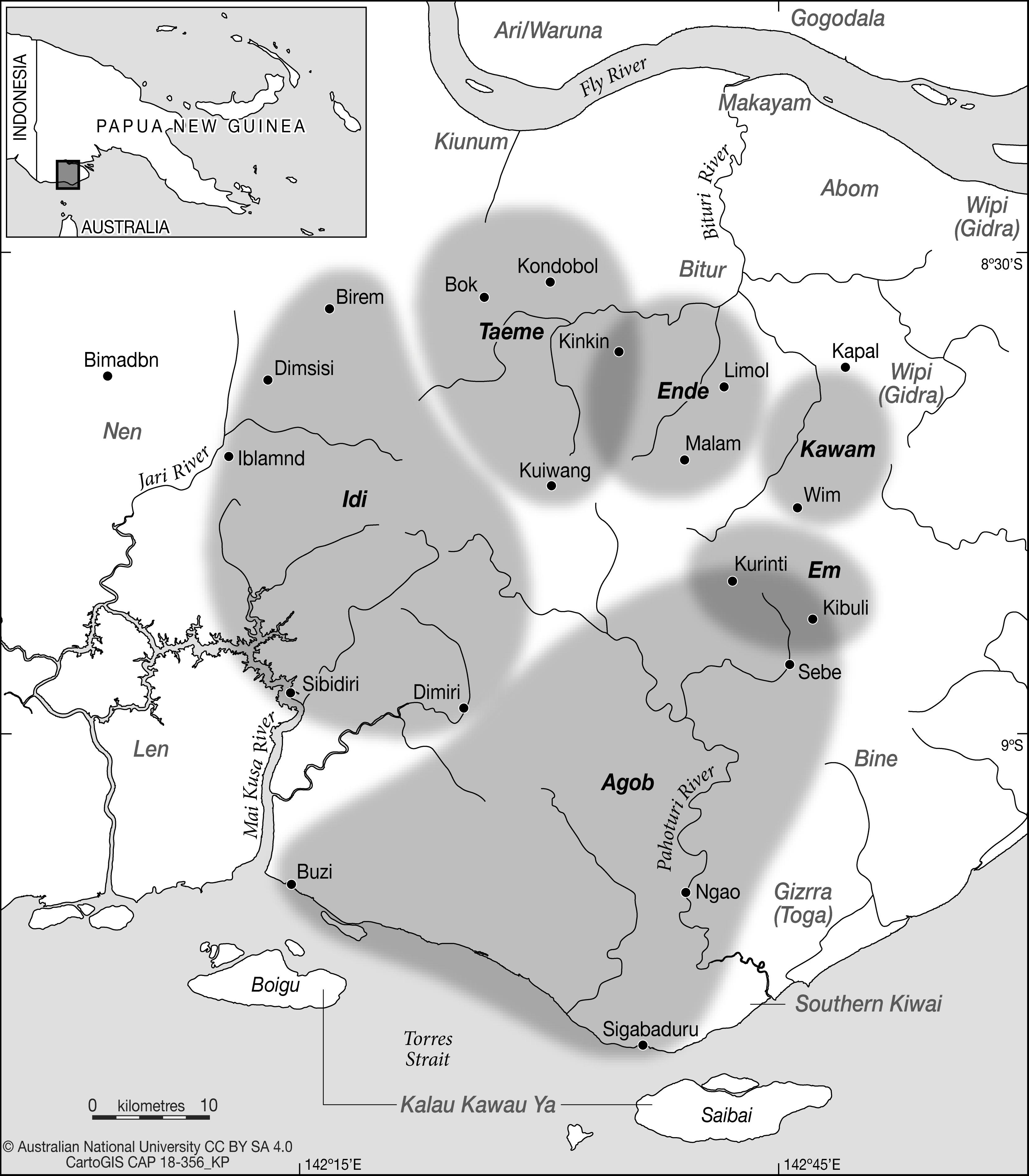
- Map: The Pahoturi languages of Papua New Guinea

The Agöb languages are a group of Pahoturi languages spoken in eastern Morehead Rural LLG, Western Province, Papua New Guinea. The language varieties include Agöb (or Dabu), Ende, and Kawam. Languages in this group, along with the Idi language, form a dialect chain with the Idi and Agob dialects proper at the ends of the chain.

== Phonology ==
The following phonology is of the Ende dialect. Ende is a language spoken primarily in the villages of Kinkin, Limol, and Malam by 600 to 1000 speakers. Ende's phoneme inventory includes 19 consonants and 7 vowels.

Ende Consonant inventory
	Bilabial	Alveolar	Retroflex	Palatal	Velar
Plosive/Affricate	p b	t d	ʈʂ ɖʐ		k g
Nasal	m	n		ɲ	ŋ
Fricative		s z			
Rhotic		ɾ~r	ɽ		
Approximant				j	w
Lateral		l			

Ende/Agob Vowel inventory
	Front	Central	Back
Close	i		u
Near-close		ɪ̈	
Mid	e	ə	o
Near-open	æ		
Open		a	

== See also ==
- Idi language

== Bibliography ==
- Kate Lynn Lindsey and Bernard Comrie. 2020. Ende (Papua New Guinea) dictionary. In: Key, Mary Ritchie & Comrie, Bernard (eds.) The Intercontinental Dictionary Series. Leipzig: Max Planck Institute for Evolutionary Anthropology. (CLDF dataset)
