= Nen =

NEN or Nen may refer to:

== Acronym ==
- Near Earth Network (formerly Ground Network), a NASA network of ground stations to support space flight missions
- NEN (TV station), an Australian television station licensed to, and serving northern New South Wales
- NEN (National Entrepreneurship Network), a Wadhwani Foundation initiative for building institutional capacity for entrepreneur support.
- Royal Netherlands Standardization Institute

== People ==
- Dick Nen (born 1939), former Major League first baseman
- Nicolas Le Nen, French army officer
- Robb Nen (born 1969), former right-handed relief pitcher in Major League Baseball
- Nen Sothearoth (born 1995), Cambodian footballer
- Trần Văn Nên (born 1927), former Vietnamese cyclist

== Other uses ==
- Nen language (Cameroon), a Bantoid language of Cameroon
- Nen language (Papuan), a language of Papua New Guinea
- Nen River, a river in China
- Nen, a form of magic from the anime Hunter x Hunter

== See also ==
- Nela (name)
