= Ndre language =

Yam language of Papua New Guinea

Ndre
- Dre
- Region: Western Province (Papua New Guinea)
- Language family: Yam: Nambu; Ndre

Language codes
- ISO 639-3: None (mis)
- Glottolog: dree1234

Ndre (Dre) is a nearly extinct Yam language spoken in Western Province, Papua New Guinea. As of 2017, only one elderly speaker remained in the village of Ramar.
