= Namo language =

Yam language of Papua New Guinea

Namo
- Region: Western Province, Papua New Guinea
- Native speakers: 370 (2018)
- Language family: Yam: Nambu; Namo

Language codes
- ISO 639-3: mxw
- Glottolog: namo1246
- ELP: Namo

Namo (or Kaunje, Mari, Na, or Dorro) is a Yam language spoken in Western Province, Papua New Guinea.
