= Rema language =

Papuan language of New Guinea

Rema
- Region: Western Province, Papua New Guinea
- Native speakers: 12 (2012)
- Language family: Trans-Fly – Bulaka River?: Yam; Tonda; Rema

Language codes
- ISO 639-3: bow
- Glottolog: rema1238
- ELP: Rema
- Rema is classified as Severely Endangered by the UNESCO Atlas of the World's Languages in Danger.

Rema, also known as Bothar, is a nearly extinct Papuan language of New Guinea.
