= Yam languages =

Family of Papuan languages

Yam
- Morehead River
- Geographic distribution: Morehead River watershed, New Guinea
- Linguistic classification: A primary language family: Yam
- Subdivisions: Yey; Nambu; Tonda

Language codes
- Glottolog: more1255
- Map: The Yam languages of New Guinea Yam languages Trans–New Guinea languages Other Papuan languages Austronesian languages Australian languages Uninhabited

The Yam languages, also known as the Morehead River languages, are a family of Papuan languages. They include many of the languages south and west of the Fly River in Papua New Guinea and Indonesian Western New Guinea (South Papua).

== Name ==
The name Morehead and Upper Maro River, or Morehead–Maro, refers to the area around the Morehead and Maro rivers. Most of the languages are found between these rivers, but the Nambu subgroup is spoken east of the Morehead. Evans (2012) refers to the family instead with the more compact name Yam. This name is motivated by a number of linguistic and cultural items of significance: yam (and cognates) means "custom, tradition"; yəm (and cognates) means "is"; and yam tubers are the local staple and of central cultural importance.

== External relationships ==
Ross (2005) tentatively includes the Yam languages in the proposed Trans-Fly – Bulaka River family. More recently (Evans 2012) has argued that this is not justified and more data has to be gathered. Evans (2018) classifies the Pahoturi River languages as an independent language family.

Yam languages have also been in intensive contact with Marind and Suki speakers, who had historically expanded into Yam-speaking territories via headhunting raids and other expansionary migrations.

== Classification ==
Internal classification of the Yam languages:

- Yei
- Tonda languages (a dialect chain)
- Nambu languages (a dialect chain)

Wichmann (2013) did not find a connection between the branches in his automated comparison.

== Languages ==
Yam languages are spoken by up to 3,000 people on both sides of the border in Papua New Guinea and Indonesia. In Papua New Guinea, Yam languages are spoken in Morehead Rural LLG, Western Province. In Papua, Indonesia, Yam languages are spoken in Merauke Regency.

Yam languages and respective demographic information listed by Evans (2018) are provided below. Geographical coordinates are also provided for some villages.

List of Yam languages
| Language | Alternative names | Subgroup | Speakers | Villages or hamlets |
|---|---|---|---|---|
| Anta | Tokwe, Upper Morehead, Thamnga | Tonda | 150 | Ufarua (8.635484°S 141.633236°E), Forzitho, Thamgakar (8.626232°S 141.611057°E) in central Morehead Rural LLG, PNG |
| Komnzo | Kamundjo, Upper Morehead, (Mema, Ranzér), Zókwasi, Farem | Tonda | 200 | Rouku (8.701793°S 141.598485°E), Gunana, Morehead (8.708915°S 141.634593°E), Firra, Masu, Kanathér in central Morehead Rural LLG, PNG |
| Wára | Tjokwe, Upper Morehead, Wära, Mät | Tonda | 350 | Yokwa (8.700472°S 141.523053°E), (Mäwsa, Kwaikér, Zäzér Ménz) in central Morehead Rural LLG, PNG |
| Wérè | Tokwe, Upper Morehead, Wórä | Tonda | 100 | Tokwa (8.643291°S 141.436129°E), Kanfok in central Morehead Rural LLG, PNG |
| Kémä | Upper Morehead | Tonda | 130 | Wämnefér (8.74137°S 141.415826°E) in central Morehead Rural LLG, PNG |
| Kánchá | Kunja, Lower Morehead, Peremka, Kénzä | Tonda | 350* | Bondobol (8.929521°S 141.338469°E), Bula (9.128337°S 141.340513°E), Jarai (9.196839°S 141.584426°E) in southeast Morehead Rural LLG, PNG |
| Ránmo | Tonda, Renmo, Blafe | Tonda | 200* | Yéndorodoro (8.59196°S 141.29677°E), Mengete (8.657045°S 141.284029°E) in west Morehead Rural LLG, PNG |
| Mblafe | Blafe, Blafe Wonana, Tonda | Tonda | 350* | Weam (8.618919°S 141.134728°E), Kandarisa (8.621418°S 141.2194°E), Wereaver (8.596603°S 141.123567°E) (only recently in Wereaver) in west Morehead Rural LLG, PNG |
| Warta Thuntai | Guntai, Kan | Tonda | 430 | Wando (8.885893°S 141.258528°E), Bensbach (8.8493°S 141.249855°E), Balamuk, Korombo 1, Korombo 2 (8.754213°S 141.265672°E) in mid southwest Morehead Rural LLG, PNG |
| Arammba | None | Tonda | 2000 | Fwasam, Gowi, Kiriwa (8.437511°S 141.515843°E), Meru (8.471963°S 141.466349°E), Sedefi (8.514592°S 141.610694°E), Serki (8.250688°S 141.766022°E) in north central Morehead Rural LLG, PNG |
| Nggarna | Ngar, Kanum, Sota | Tonda | unknown | Vicinity of Sota in west Morehead Rural LLG, PNG |
| Rema | | Tonda | 10? (moribund or extinct) | Wereaver (8.596603°S 141.123567°E) in west Morehead Rural LLG, PNG |
| Smerki | Smärki, Kanum, Barkari | Tonda | 150 | Rawu Biru, Tomer, Tomerau, Yakiw in southeast Merauke Regency, Indonesia |
| Tamer | Smerki, Smärki, Kanum | Tonda | 120 | Yanggandur (recently moved there) in southeast Merauke Regency, Indonesia |
| Ngkontar | Ngkontar, Ngkolmpu | Tonda | 100 | Yanggandur in southeast Merauke Regency, Indonesia and into PNG |
| Ngkolmpu | Kiki, Ngkntra Kiki, Kanum, Enkelembu, Kenume, Knwne | Tonda | | east Merauke Regency, Indonesia and into PNG |
| Bedi Ngkolmpu | Kanum, Enkelembu, Kenume, Knwne | Tonda | 5 (moribund or extinct) | Onggaya in south central Merauke Regency, Indonesia |
| Yei | | Yei | 1278 | Po, Torai, Bupul, Tanas, Kwel in east Merauke Regency, Indonesia |
| Nen | | Nambu | 350 | Bimadeben (8.701793°S 141.598485°E) in central Morehead Rural LLG, PNG |
| Nama | | Nambu | 1200 | Daraia (8.61637°S 141.733576°E), Mata (8.674546°S 141.743133°E), Ngaraita (8.599511°S 141.714869°E) in central Morehead Rural LLG, PNG |
| Namat | Mibini | Nambu | 170* | Mibini (8.838849°S 141.637931°E) in central Morehead Rural LLG, PNG |
| Nambo | Nmbo, Keraki; Namna, Yarne | Nambu | 710 | Nambo variety: Gubam (8.619428°S 141.922509°E), Bebdeben (8.667668°S 141.925772°E), Arufi (8.760576°S 141.913707°E) in central Morehead Rural LLG, PNG; Namna variety: Pongarki (8.664295°S 141.827064°E), Derideri (8.686837°S 141.85624°E) in central Morehead Rural LLG, PNG |
| Neme | | Nambu | 200 | Keru (8.483752°S 141.788348°E), Mitere in central Morehead Rural LLG, PNG |
| Dre | Ndre | Nambu | 1 | Ramar in central Morehead Rural LLG, PNG |
| Namo | Nä | Nambu | 374* | Tais (9.167526°S 141.905733°E), Mari (9.193532°S 141.70247°E) in south Morehead Rural LLG, PNG |
| Len | Lä | Nambu | 8–10 | Now living in Tais (9.167526°S 141.905733°E), original village was Yaoga in south Morehead Rural LLG, PNG |

See also: Districts of Papua (Indonesian Wikipedia)

== Pronouns ==
The pronouns Ross (2005) reconstructs for the family are,

Proto-Yam (Proto–Morehead – Upper Maro)

| I/we | *ni |
| you | *bu |
| s/he/they | *be |

== Typology ==
Many Yam languages display vowel harmony, including in Nambu and Tonda languages.

== Vocabulary comparison ==
The following basic vocabulary words are from McElhanon & Voorhoeve (1970) and Voorhoeve (1975), as cited in the Trans-New Guinea database.

The words cited constitute translation equivalents, whether they are cognate (e.g. tor, ter for "tooth") or not (e.g. sento, yarmaker for "bird").

| gloss | Kanum | Yei |
|---|---|---|
| head | mel | kilpel |
| hair | mel-kata | peab |
| eye | si | cur |
| tooth | tor | ter |
| leg | tegu | cere |
| louse | neːmpin | nim |
| dog | krar | jeu |
| pig | kwer | becek |
| bird | sento | yarmaker |
| egg | bel | mekur |
| blood | mbel | gul |
| bone | mbaːr | gor |
| skin | keikei | paːr |
| tree | per | per |
| man | ire | el-lu |
| sun | koŋko | mir |
| water | ataka | kao |
| fire | mens | benj |
| stone | melle | mejer |
| name | iu | ore |
| eat | anaŋ | cenye |
| one | namper | nampei |
| two | yempoka | yetapae |
