= Torasi Estuary =

Indonesian/Papua New Guinean Estuary

- Bensbach Estuary
- Muara Torasi (Indonesian)
- Location within South Papua
- Location: Merauke Regency, South Papua, Indonesia; South Fly, Western Province, Papua New Guinea
- Coordinates: 9°07′43″S 141°01′10″E
- Part of: Bensbach River
- Primary outflows: Arafura Sea
- Basin countries: Indonesia; Papua New Guinea
- Frozen: Never
- Settlements: Kondo hamlet, Indonesia

Torasi Estuary is the estuary of Bensbach River, located at the southern end of the Indonesia–Papua New Guinea border. It empties into the Arafura Sea. The mouth of the estuary is administered by Indonesia with Papua New Guinean ships given right of passage to pass the mouth. There is an Indonesian Navy outpost at the west bank which also operates as a border control to regulate immigration between citizens of the two countries.
