= Län language =

Yam language of Papua New Guinea

Län
- Len
- Region: Western Province (Papua New Guinea)
- Language family: Yam: Nambu; Län

Language codes
- ISO 639-3: None (mis)
- Glottolog: lenn1234

Län (Len, or Dapo, Dungerwab, Parb, Tuj) is a Yam language spoken in Western Province, Papua New Guinea.
