= Upper Morehead language =

Language of Papua New Guinea

Upper Morehead
- Wára
- Region: Western Province, Papua New Guinea
- Native speakers: 350 Wára proper (2018); 930 Anta-Komnzo-Wára-Wérè-Kémä (2018)
- Language family: Trans-Fly – Bulaka River?: Yam; Tonda; Upper Morehead
- Dialects: Wára; Kómnjo; Anta; Wèré

Language codes
- ISO 639-3: tci
- Glottolog: wara1294

Upper Morehead, also known as Wára, is a Papuan language of New Guinea. Varieties are Wára (Vara), Kómnjo (Rouku), Anta, and Wèré (Wärä); these are divergent enough to sometimes be listed as distinct languages.
