= Yay =

Yay may refer to:

- St. Anthony Airport, Newfoundland and Labrador, Canada, by IATA code
- Gwune language, by ISO 639-3 code
- Yay!, 2023 album by Motorpsycho
- Yay language, an alternate name for Bouyei, in southern Guizhou Province in mainland China
- Youth Assisting Youth, a volunteer-based peer mentoring program based in Toronto, Ontario, Canada

== See also ==
- "Yay Yay", a 2013 song by Schoolboy Q
- Jay (disambiguation)
- Yea (disambiguation)
