= Morehead River =

River in Papua New Guinea

- Location in Papua New Guinea

Location
- Country: Papua New Guinea
- Region: Western Province

Physical characteristics
- Source
  - location: Papua New Guinea
- Mouth: Arafura Sea
  - location: Morehead Rural LLG in southwestern Western Province
  - coordinates: 9°08′19″S 141°20′31″E
- Length: 175 km (109 mi)
- Basin size: 3,555.8 km^{2} (1,372.9 mi^{2})
- Discharge
  - location: Near mouth
  - average: 95.1 m^{3}/s (3,360 cu ft/s)

The Morehead River is a river in southwestern Papua New Guinea. It is located just to the east of the Bensbach River, and to the west of the Fly River. The river flows through the Trans-Fly savanna and grasslands.

The mouth of the river is located at the southern end of Morehead Rural LLG and discharges at the head of Heath Bay.

The Morehead River was named after Boyd Dunlop Morehead, 10th Premier of Queensland by Sir William MacGregor.

Yam languages, also known as the Morehead-Wasur languages, are spoken in the Morehead River area.

== See also ==
- List of rivers of Papua New Guinea
- Western Province (Papua New Guinea)
- Tonda Wildlife Management Area
- Trans-Fly savanna and grasslands
- Bensbach River
