= Yei language =

Yam language spoken in South Papua, Indonesia

Yei
- Yey
- Region: South Papua
- Ethnicity: Yei
- Native speakers: (2,400 cited 2001)
- Language family: Trans-Fly – Bulaka River?: Yam; Yei
- Dialects: Upper; Lower

Language codes
- ISO 639-3: jei
- Glottolog: yeii1239

Yei (Yey, Jei, Je, Yei-Nan) is a Papuan language spoken along the upper reaches of the Maro River, in the Merauke, South Papua, Indonesia. The Upper and Lower Yey dialects are only mutually intelligible with difficulty.

== Distribution ==
According to Merauke local government, Yei people live in multiple villages spread between four districts in eastern Merauke Regency, a finding corroborated by Evans (2018):

- Distrik Ulilin (Upper Yei): Belbeland, Kireli, Baidup
- Distrik Elikobel (Upper Yei): Bupul, Bupul Indah, Tanas, Kweel, Sipias, Metaat Makmur, Gerisar, Bunggay, Bouwer, Enggal Jaya, Tof Tof, Bumun
- Distrik Sota (Lower Yei): Erambu, Toray
- Distrik Jagebob (Lower Yei): Poo, Nalkin, Blandinkakayu, Obattrauw, Melimmegikar, Yamunan Jaya, Makartin Jaya, Kartini, Anggerpermagi, Wenda Asri, Mimi Baru, Gurinda Jaya, Kamnau Sari
