= Neme language =

Yam language of Papua New Guinea

Neme
- Region: Western Province (Papua New Guinea)
- Native speakers: 200 (2018)
- Language family: Yam: Nambu; Neme

Language codes
- ISO 639-3: nex
- Glottolog: neme1244
- Neme is classified as Severely Endangered by the UNESCO Atlas of the World's Languages in Danger.

Neme (or Dorro, Karigari, Moi-e ~ Moive) is a Yam language spoken in Western Province, Papua New Guinea.
