= Nama language (Papuan) =

Yam language of Papua New Guinea

Nama
- Region: Western Province (Papua New Guinea)
- Native speakers: 1,200 (2018)
- Language family: Yam: Nambu; Nama

Language codes
- ISO 639-3: nmx
- Glottolog: nama1266

Nama (pronounced [ˈnəmə], or Noraia) is a Yam language spoken in Western Province, Papua New Guinea.

== Phonology ==
=== Consonants ===
		Labial		Alveolar	Post- alveolar	Palatal	Velar	
		plain	lab.	Alveolar	Post- alveolar	Palatal	plain	lab.
Nasal		m	mʷ	n		ɲ	ŋ	
Plosive/ Affricate	voiceless	(p)		t			k	kʷ
Plosive/ Affricate	voiced	b		d	d͡ʒ		ɡ	(ɡʷ)
Plosive/ Affricate	prenasal	ᵐb	ᵐbʷ	ⁿd	ⁿd͡ʒ		ᵑɡ	ᵑɡʷ
Fricative		ɸ	ɸʷ	s			ɣ	
Rhotic				r				
Lateral				l				
Approximant						j	w	

- Sounds /p/ and /ɡʷ/ only occur marginally^{[elaboration needed]}.
- Sounds /t, d, ⁿd/ may range in articulation, varying from dental [t̪, d̪, ⁿd̪] to alveolar [t, d, ⁿd].
- /r/ can be heard as a tap [ɾ] when in rapid speech and in consonant clusters.
- /ɸ/ can become voiced as [β] when intervocalically or word-finally.
- /ɣ/ can also be heard as [ɰ] in some contexts^{[what contexts?]}.
- Sounds /n, r/ can occur as geminates [nː, rː].

=== Vowels ===
	Front		Central	Back
Close	i	y		u
Near-close	ɪ			
Mid	e	ø	ə	o
Near-open	æ			
Open			a	

- Sounds /i, o, u/ can be heard as [ɪ], [ɔ], [ʊ, ʉ] within diphthongs.
