= Kómnzo language =

Yam language of Papua New Guinea

Komnzo
- Rouku
- Region: Papua New Guinea
- Native speakers: 150–250 (2018)
- Language family: Yam: Tonda; Upper Morehead; Komnzo

Language codes
- ISO 639-3: None (mis)
- Glottolog: komn1238
- ELP: Komnzo
- Location within Papua New Guinea Location within Oceania
- Coordinates: 8.701793°S 141.598485°E

Komnzo (also Kómnzo, Kómnjo, Kamundjo) is a Yam language of Papua New Guinea spoken by 150–250 people in the village of Rouku (8.701793°S 141.598485°E) and the town of Morehead.

== Phonology ==
=== Consonants ===
The consonant inventory comprises 18 phonemes (ᵐb, t, ⁿd, k, ᵑɡ, kʷ, ᵑɡʷ, m, n, ŋ, ɸ, ʦ, ⁿʣ, ð, s, r, w, j). The system consists of a series of obstruents (oral and prenasalized plosives and affricates), fricatives, nasals and semivowels. Consonants occurring only in loanwords are: b, g, d, l.

		Bilabial	Coronal			Palatal	Velar	
		Bilabial	Dental	Alveolar	Post-alveolar	Palatal	Plain	Labialized
Nasal		m ⟨m⟩		n ⟨n⟩			ŋ ⟨ŋ⟩	
Plosive	Voiceless		t̪~t ⟨t⟩				k ⟨k⟩	kʷ ⟨kw⟩
Plosive	Prenasal	ᵐb ⟨b⟩		ⁿd ⟨d⟩			ᵑɡ ⟨g⟩	ᵑɡʷ ⟨gw⟩
Affricate	Voiceles			ts~tʃ ⟨z⟩				
Affricate	Prenasal			ⁿdz~ⁿdʒ ⟨nz⟩				
Fricative		ɸ ⟨f⟩	ð ⟨th⟩	s ⟨s⟩				
Rhotic				r~ɾ ⟨r⟩				
Semivowels						j ⟨y⟩		w ⟨w⟩

=== Vowels ===
The vowel inventory consists of eight phonemes (i, e, æ, a, ʏ, ø, u, o) and one epenthetic vowel (ə̆).

	Front		Central	Back
	Unrounded	Rounded	Central	Back
Close	i ⟨i⟩	y ⟨ü⟩		u ⟨u⟩
Mid	e ⟨e⟩	œ ⟨ö⟩	ə̆ ⟨é⟩	o ⟨o⟩
Near-open	æ ⟨ä⟩			
Open			a ⟨a⟩	

=== Epenthesis ===
Komnzo phonology exhibits widespread vowel epenthesis. The epenthetic vowel is usually a short schwa (ə̆), sometimes a short high front or high back vowel. Many syllables and many words in Komnzo lack a specified vowel, e.g. mnz 'house' [mə̆nts] or gwth 'nest' [ᵑɡʷə̆θ].

=== Orthography ===
In the tables above, graphemes are indicated by <angle brackets>. The current orthography of Komnzo does not represent the epenthetic vowel because it can be predicted by the rules of syllabification. This leads to orthographic representations which untrained users might find hard to pronounce, for example: zfth 'reason' is pronounced [tsə̆ɸə̆θ] or fta '36' is pronounced [ɸə̆ta].

== Numeral system ==
Komnzo number words use a senary numeral system, with the following powers: nibo (6^{1}), fta (6^{2}), taruba (6^{3}), damno (6^{4}), wärämäkä (6^{5}) and wi (6^{6}). Counting in larger quantities is restricted to a ritualized counting procedure, whereby yam tubers are counted publicly for exchange feasts. Traditionally, damno is the number of yams one should store to feed a family for a year. For everyday counting above six, English numerals are borrowed.

Komnzo	English	value
näbi	‘one’	1
eda ~ yda	‘two’	2
etha ~ ytho	‘three’	3
asar	‘four’	4
tabuthui	‘five’	5
nibo	‘six’	6
nibo a näbi	'seven'	6 and 1
nibo a eda	'eight'	6 and 2
fta	‘36’	6^{2}
taruba	‘216’	6^{3}
damno	‘1296’	6^{4}
wärämäkä	‘7776’	6^{5}
wi	'46656'	6^{6}
