= Pahoturi River =

River in Papua New Guinea

Pahoturi River Paho river
- Location within Papua New Guinea

Location
- Country: Papua New Guinea
- Region: Western Province

Physical characteristics
- Source
  - location: Papua New Guinea
- Mouth: Arafura Sea
  - coordinates: 9°16′38″S 142°44′50″E
- Length: 80 km (50 mi)
- Basin size: 1,431.5 km^{2} (552.7 mi^{2})
- Discharge
  - location: Near mouth
  - average: 27.7 m^{3}/s (980 cu ft/s)

The Pahoturi, or Paho River, is a river in southwestern Papua New Guinea.

== See also ==
- List of rivers of Papua New Guinea
- Pahoturi languages
