= Idi language =

Pahoturi language of Papua New Guinea

Idi
- Region: New Guinea
- Native speakers: (1,600 cited 2000 census)
- Language family: Trans-Fly: Pahoturi; Idi
- Dialects: Idi; Tame

Language codes
- ISO 639-3: idi
- Glottolog: idii1243
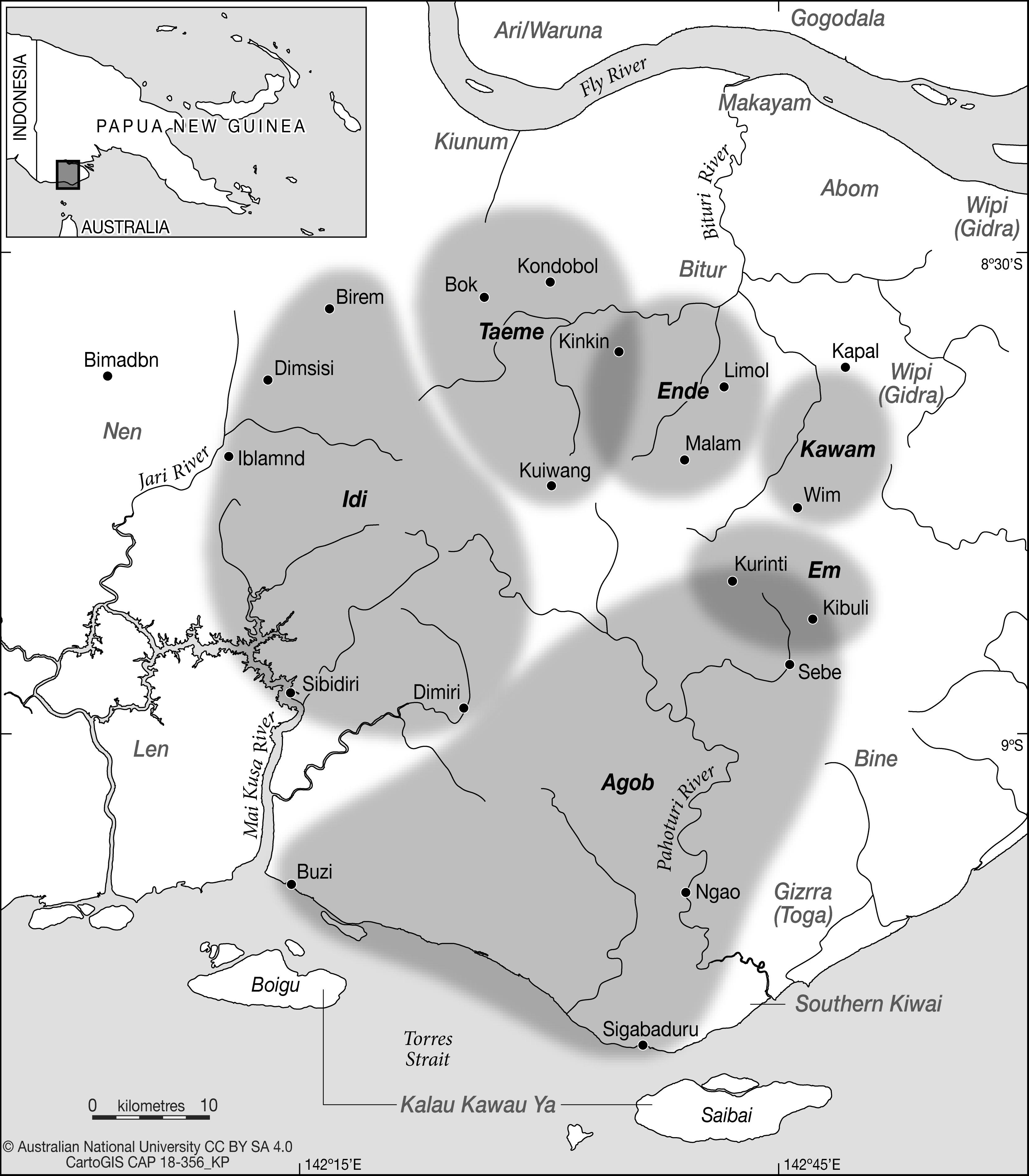
- Map: The Pahoturi languages of Papua New Guinea

Idi is a Pahoturi language spoken in Western Province, Papua New Guinea. The so-called Pahoturi dialects form a dialect chain with Idi proper at one end and Agob proper at the other.

== Name ==
The language has been also known as Diblaeg, Dibolug, Dimisi, Dimsisi. Taeme is a dialect distinct from Idi.

== Social context ==
Idi is in contact with other Papuan languages of different families, including Nen, Nambo, and the closely related Agob.

== Phonology ==
Idi phonemic inventory:

Consonants
		Bilabial	Alveolar	Post- alveolar	Retroflex	Palatal	Velar	Labio- velar
Stop/ Affricate	voiceless	p	t		ʈ		k	kʷ
Stop/ Affricate	voiced	b	d	dʒ	ɖ		g	gʷ
Stop/ Affricate	prenasalized	ᵐb	ⁿd	ⁿdʒ	ᶯɖ		ᵑɡ	ᵑɡʷ
Nasal		m	n			ɲ	ŋ	
Fricative	voiceless		s					
Fricative	voiced		z					
Approximant	liquid		l			ʎ		
Approximant	semivowel					j	w	
Trill			r					

/z/ may also freely be realized as affricates [dʒ, dz].

Vowels
	Front	Central	Back
Close	i		u
Near-close		ɪ	
Mid	e	ə	o
Near-open	æ		
Open		a	

/ə/ may also be heard as [ɐ].

== Grammar ==
Idi has elaborate verbal morphology, including complex marking of verbal number. Other noteworthy features, which it shares with other Pahoturi River languages, are the high frequency of analytic constructions (consisting of an uninflecting form plus an inflected auxiliary) in addition to directly inflected verbs, and an elaborate inventory of copulas.

== See also ==
- Agob language
