= Tonda languages =

Branch of the Yam language family of southern New Guinea

Tonda
- West Morehead River
- Geographic distribution: Southern New Guinea
- Linguistic classification: Yam: Tonda

Language codes
- Glottolog: tond1250
- Map: The Yam languages of New Guinea Yam languages Trans–New Guinea languages Other Papuan languages Austronesian languages Australian languages Uninhabited

The Tonda languages form a branch of the Yam language family of southern New Guinea. There are over 10 languages.

Tonda languages share some areal features are shared with the Kolopom languages.

== Languages ==
The Tonda languages are:

Tonda / West Morehead River

- Arammba
- Central Morehead River: Anta, Kómnzo, Wára, Wérè, Kémä, Kánchá
- Warta Thuntai
- Bensbach River
  - Upper Bensbach River
    - Mblafe–Ránmo
    - Ngarna–Rema
      - Nggarna (Sota)
      - Rema
  - Kanum
    - Ngkolmpu: Ngkâlmpw/Ngkontar, Bädi
    - South Kanum: Bârkâli-Smärki, Tämer

Notes (see Evans 2018: 681):

- Each terminal bullet point lists a different dialect chain.
- Ránmo is linguistically a dialect of Mblafe, but Ránmo speakers consider their language to be a separate, distinct language.
- Wérè is linguistically a dialect of Wára, but Wèré speakers consider their language to be a separate, distinct language.

== Numeral typology ==
Tonda languages are unique for their base-6 numeral systems, which likely originated from counting yams (rather than fingers or body parts as with most other languages).
