= Namat language =

Yam language spoken in Papua New Guinea

Namat
- Region: Western Province (Papua New Guinea)
- Native speakers: 170 (2018)
- Language family: Yam: Nambu; Namat

Language codes
- ISO 639-3: nkm
- Glottolog: nama1267
- ELP: Namat

Namat (or Potaia) is a Yam language spoken in Western Province, Papua New Guinea.
