= Bulaka River =

Bulaka River Boelaka-rivier
- Location of river mouth Bulaka River (Indonesia)

Location
- Country: Indonesia

Physical characteristics
- Source
  - location: Western Papua
- Mouth: Arafura Sea
  - coordinates: 8.1°S 139.2°E

The Bulaka River is a river in South Papua province, Indonesia.

== Geography ==
The river flows in the southern area of Papua with a predominantly tropical monsoon climate (designated as Am in the Köppen-Geiger climate classification). The annual average temperature in the area is 23 °C. The warmest month is October when the average temperature is around 26 °C, and the coldest is June, at 20 °C. The average annual rainfall is 2155 mm. The wettest month is February, with an average of 356 mm of rainfall, and the driest is August, with 16 mm of rainfall.

== See also ==
- List of drainage basins of Indonesia
- List of rivers of Indonesia
- List of rivers of Western New Guinea
