= Indonesia–Papua New Guinea border =

International border

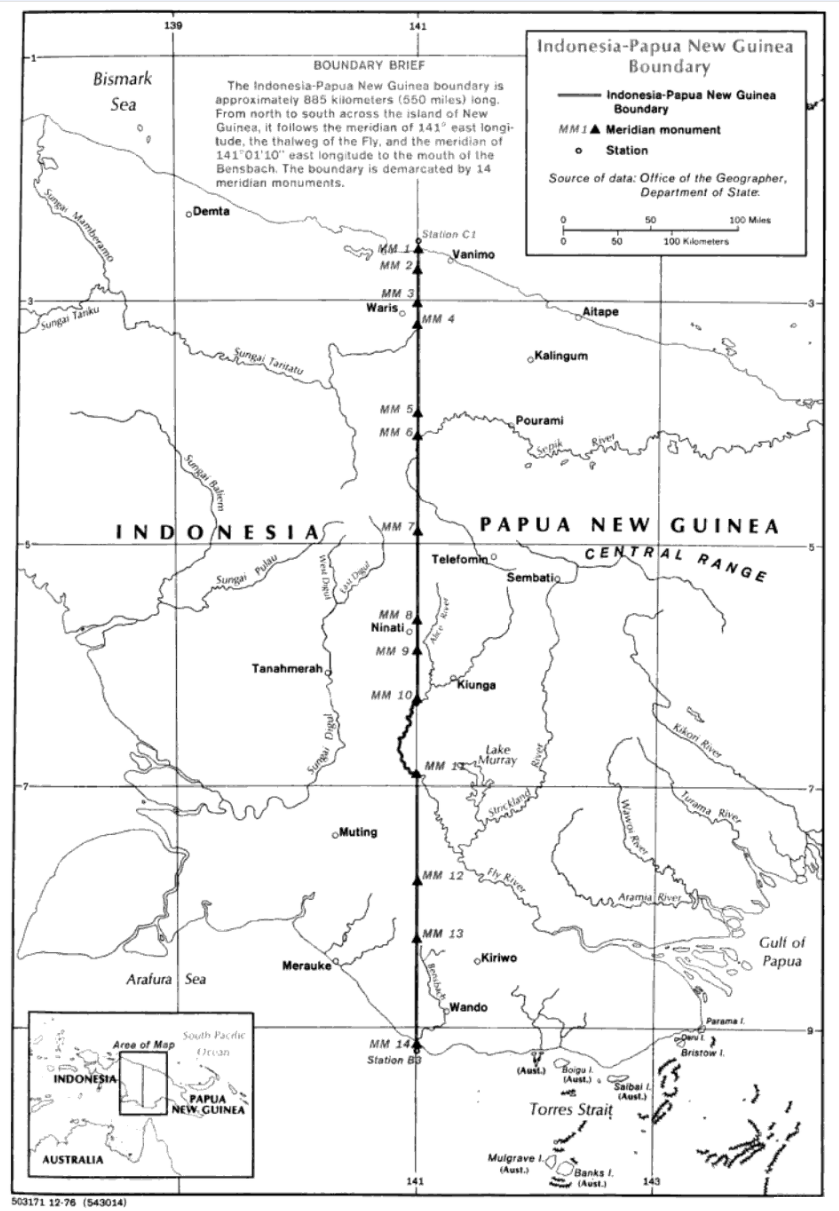
- Map of the Indonesia–Papua New Guinea border

Characteristics
- Entities: Indonesia Papua New Guinea
- Length: 824 km (512 mi)

History
- Established: 1895; Great Britain–Netherlands Convention
- Current shape: 1975; Independence of Papua New Guinea

The Indonesia–Papua New Guinea border separates the Papua, Highland Papua, and South Papua provinces of Indonesia from the Sandaun and Western provinces of Papua New Guinea. The border, which divides the island of New Guinea in half, consists of two straight north–south lines connected by a short section running along the Fly River, totalling 824 km (512 mi).

== Description ==
The border starts in the north at northern coast of New Guinea, immediately west of the Papuan village of Wutung and Mount Bougainville. It then proceeds in a straight longitudinal line to the south along the 141st meridian east, cutting across the Oenake Range, the Kohari Hills, the Bewani Mountains, the Border Mountains and the Central Highlands. Upon reaching the Fly River it then follows this in a C-shaped curve, before continuing in a N-S line at 141º 01'10" meridian east, cutting across the Kai Lagoon, down to the estuary of the Bensbach River with the Torres Strait on the southern coast of New Guinea.

== History ==
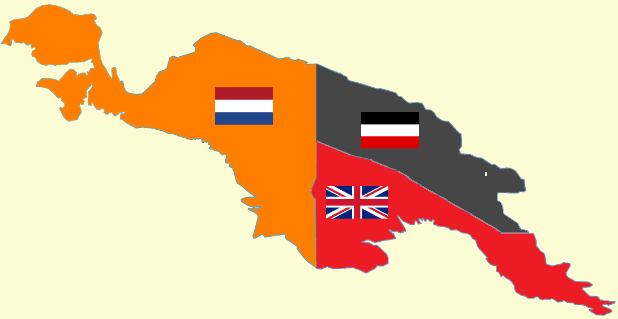
The colonial partition of New Guinea from 1884 to 1919

Under the 1529 Treaty of Zaragoza New Guinea had been divided between Spain and Portugal very roughly at the 147°E meridian. The Netherlands began colonising the area of modern Indonesia (then called the Dutch East Indies) in the 17th century, and extended their rule eastwards. In 1828 they claimed the north-west coast of New Guinea as far as the 140th meridian east in 1828, as part of the traditional lands of the Sultan of Tidore. In 1884 the north-eastern quarter of New Guinea was claimed by German Empire as Kaiser-Wilhelmsland and the south-eastern corner became a protectorate of British Empire, later reorganised as the Crown colony of British New Guinea in 1888. The two empires agreed a border between their respective territories in 1885. In 1895 Britain and the Netherlands signed a border treaty which delimited their common boundary on the island at its current location.

British New Guinea was transferred to Australian control in 1902 and reorganised as the Territory of Papua in 1906. German New Guinea was occupied by Australian forces in 1914 and became a League of Nations mandate administered by Australia after the war's end. Following a period of Japanese occupation during World War II, the New Guinea mandate was unified with Papua in 1949 as the Territory of Papua and New Guinea. Indonesia gained recognized independence in 1949, however Dutch New Guinea was kept under Dutch rule owing to its unique character, sparking a dispute with Indonesia, which claimed the territory. The territory was later transferred to Indonesia in 1963, with some locals opposed to Indonesian rule and began an insurgency that continues today. The eastern half of the island was renamed Papua New Guinea in 1973 and gained independence in 1975. The border was based on an Australian-Indonesia treaty signed on 13 February 1973 which fixed the border at its current position.

Tensions between Indonesia and Papua New Guinea grew, as the ongoing West Papuan conflict destabilised the border region, causing flows of refugees and cross-border incursions by Indonesia's military. Over 10,000 Papuans from the Indonesian side crossed the border in 1984, fleeing crackdowns in the aftermath of an uprising. In 1986 a friendship treaty between the two countries was signed, by which both sides agreed to settle any issues they had peacefully. The treaty was renewed in 1990.

In 2020, due to the COVID-19 pandemic, the border was officially closed, but in practice people continued to pass through the porous borders. It was reopened in September 2021, but then was once more closed by November.

== Border crossings ==
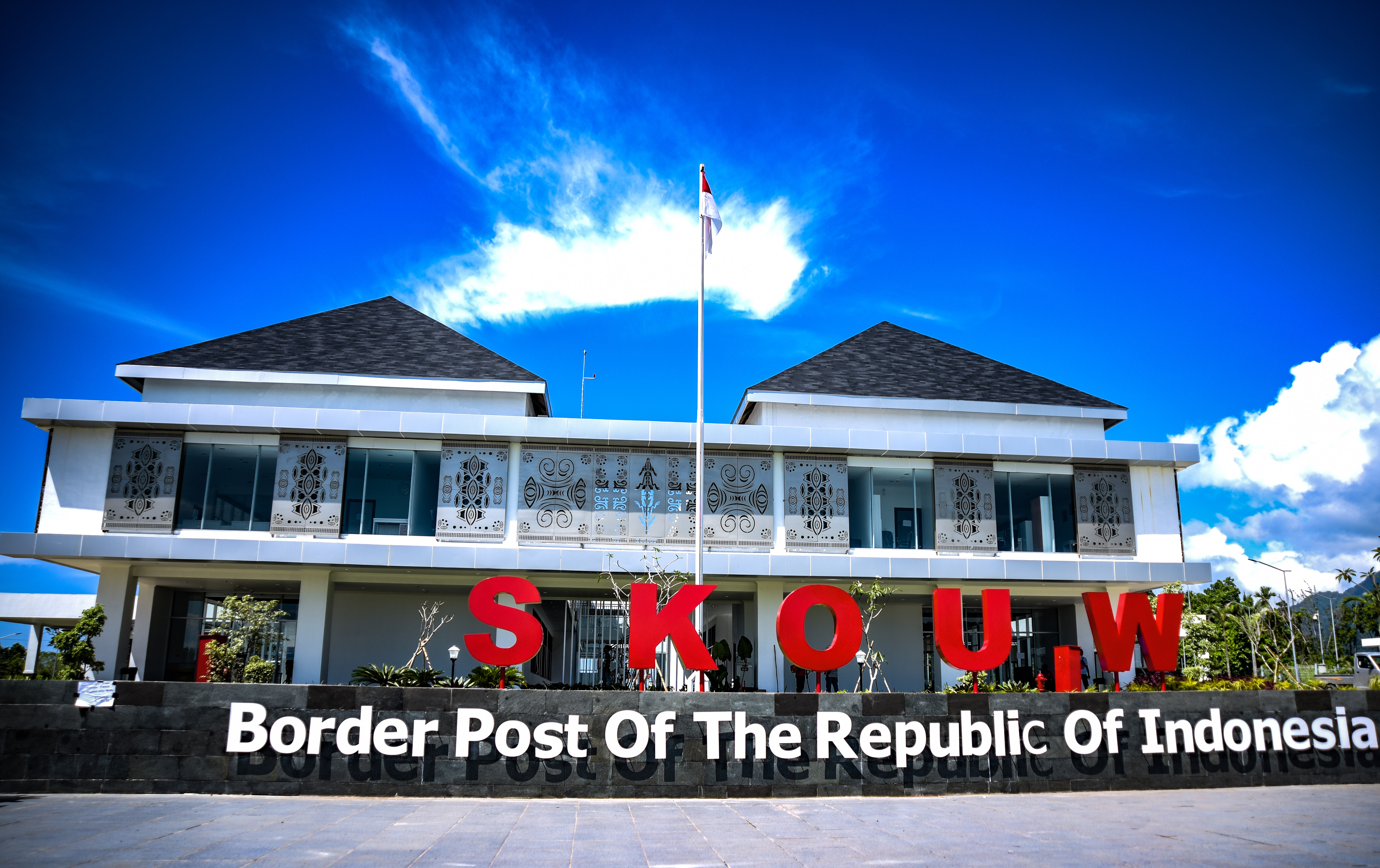
Skouw border post in Jayapura

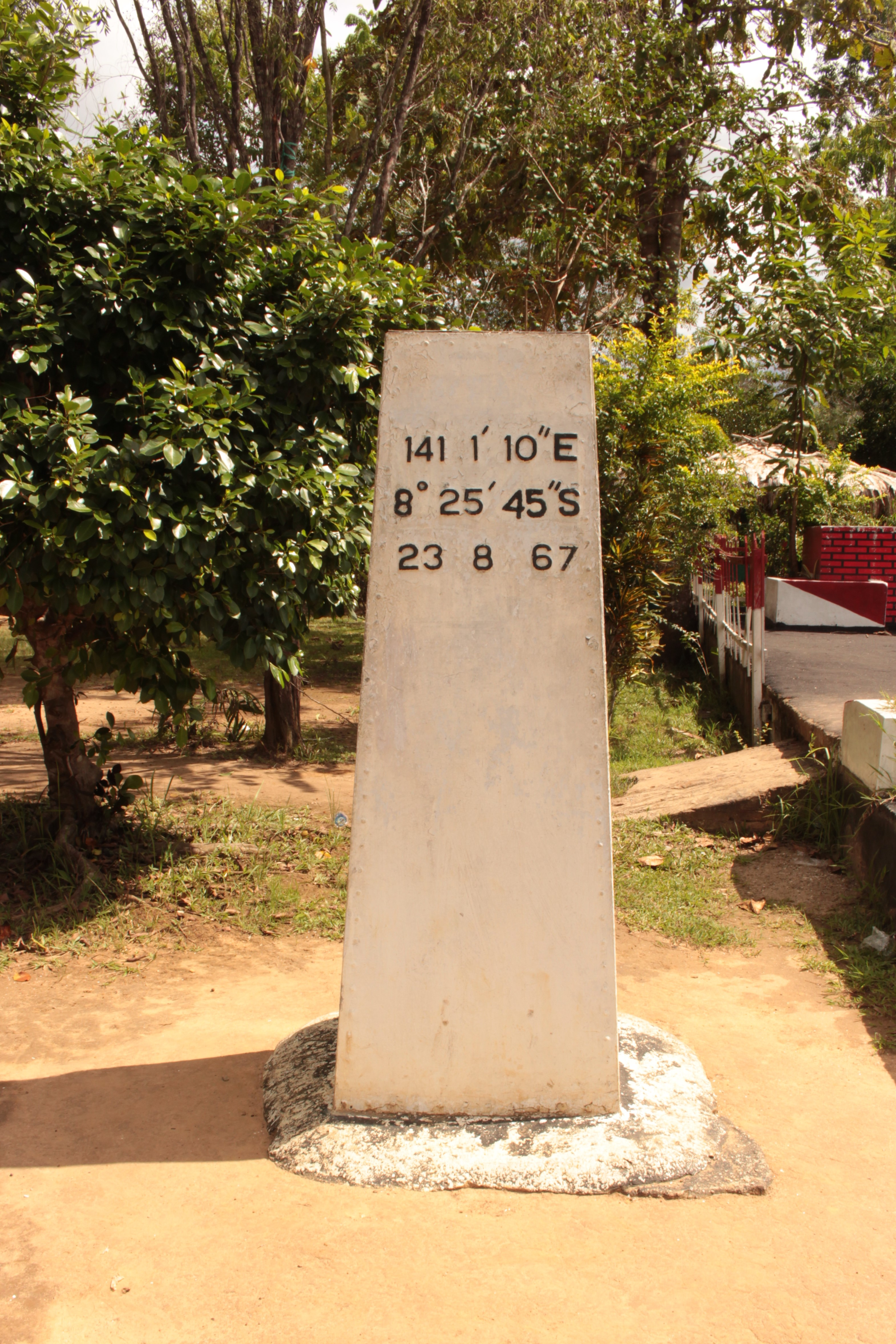
Border pillar MM13 near border post of Sota

There is currently just one binational, official crossing point, between Jayapura (Indonesia, at Skouw) and Vanimo (Papua New Guinea). However Indonesia had established another border post in Waris, Keerom Regency, Sota and Torasi, Merauke Regency, as well as a border post in construction in Yetetkun, Boven Digoel Regency.

== See also ==
- Indonesia–Papua New Guinea relations
