= Bensbach River =

River in Papua New Guinea

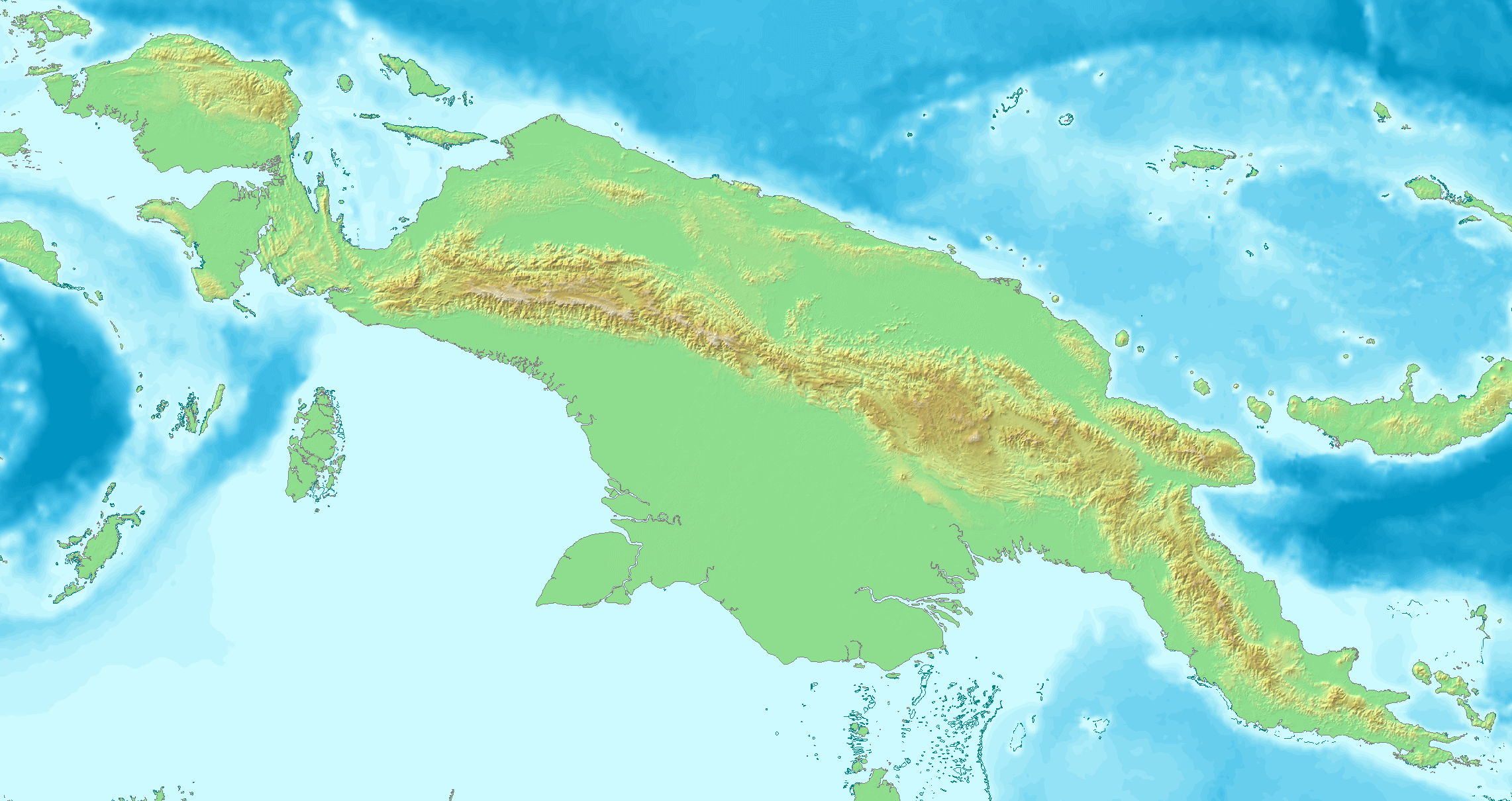
- Location in Western New Guinea Location in Papua New Guinea Location in New Guinea

Location
- Country: Papua New Guinea
- Region: Western Province

Physical characteristics
- Source
  - location: Papua New Guinea
- Mouth: Arafura Sea
  - location: Torasi Estuary, southwestern Western Province, near the Indonesian border
  - coordinates: 9°07′43″S 141°01′09″E
- Length: 242 km (150 mi)
- Basin size: 2,516.7 km^{2} (971.7 mi^{2})
- Discharge
  - location: Near mouth
  - average: 88.74 m^{3}/s (3,134 cu ft/s)

The Bensbach River is a river in southwestern Papua New Guinea. It is located just to the east of the Maro River in Merauke Regency, Indonesia, and just to the west of the Morehead River in Papua New Guinea.

The mouth of the river, Torasi Estuary, marks part of the extreme southern boundary between Papua New Guinea and Indonesia.

The river is strongly meandering and rather narrow. From the rivermouth, it stretches in a roughly northeasterly direction, and so is entirely located in PNG territory. It flows through the Trans-Fly savanna and grasslands, including the Tonda Wildlife Management Area.

Europeans first discovered the river on 27 February 1893, and it was named after Jacob Bensbach, Dutch Resident at Ternate, by Sir William MacGregor. The local people call it the Torassi (sometimes spelled Torasi).

Tonda languages are spoken in the Bensbach River area.

== See also ==
- List of rivers of Papua New Guinea
- Western Province (Papua New Guinea)
- Tonda Wildlife Management Area
- Trans-Fly savanna and grasslands
- Morehead River
