= Pahoturi languages =

Family of language in New Guinea

Pahoturi
- Paho River
- Geographic distribution: Pahoturi River, New Guinea
- Linguistic classification: Trans-Fly or independent language family: Pahoturi
- Subdivisions: Agöb; Idi

Language codes
- Glottolog: paho1240
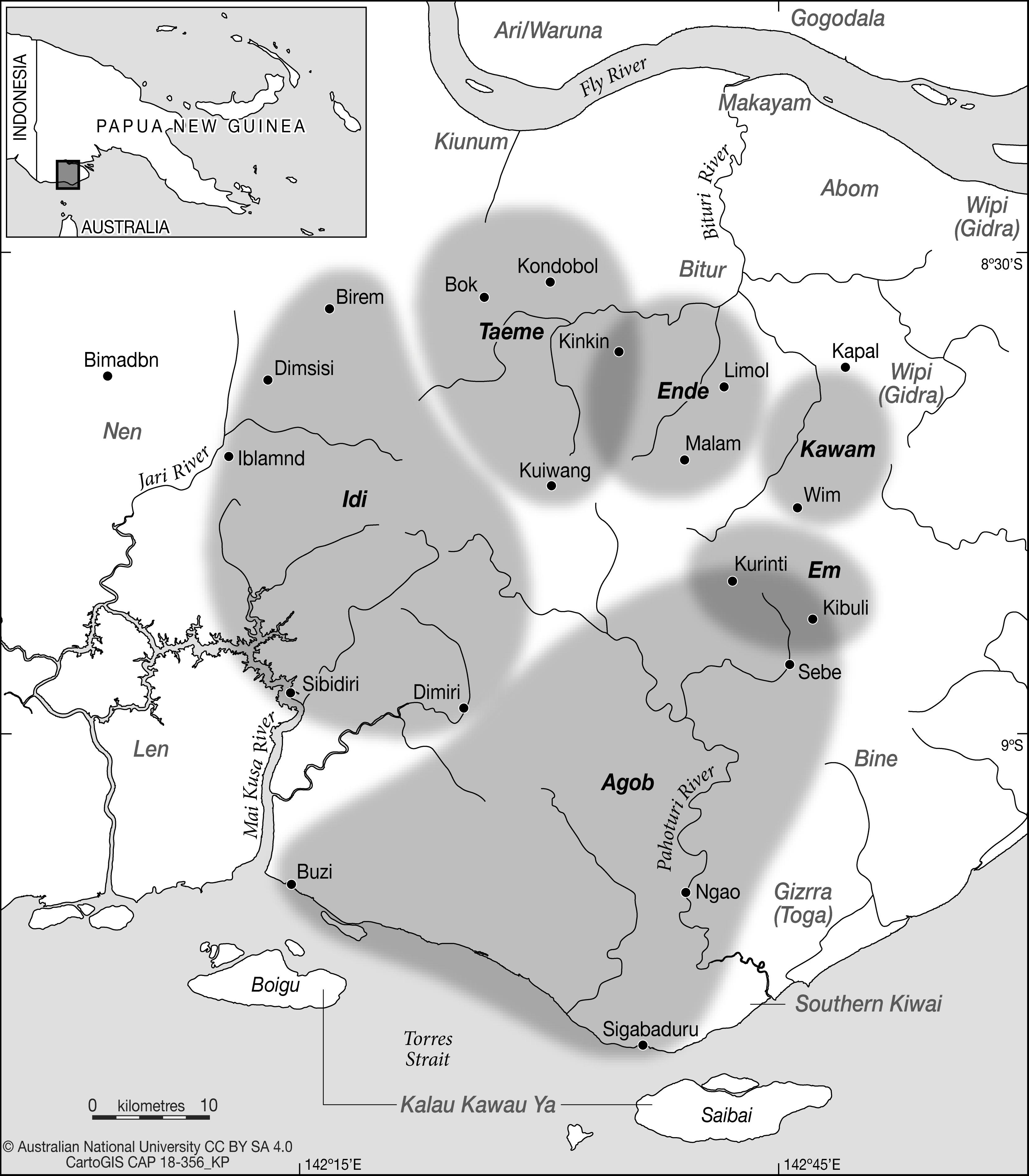
- Map: The Pahoturi languages of New Guinea

The Pahoturi River languages are a small family of Papuan languages spoken around the Pahoturi (Paho River). This family includes eight language varieties including Agöb (Dabu), Em, Ende, Idan, Idi, Idzuwe, Kawam, and Taeme, which are spoken in the Pahoturi River area south of the Fly River, just west of the Eastern Trans-Fly languages. Idzuwe is no longer spoken. Ross (2005) tentatively includes them in the proposed Trans-Fly – Bulaka River family, though more recent work has classified Pahoturi River as an independent family within the region.

Some Pahoturi River speakers were originally hunter-gatherers, but have recently shifted to becoming gardeners.

== Classification ==
Wurm (1975) and Ross (2005) suggest that the Pahoturi languages may be related to the Tabo (Waia) language just north of the Fly delta. However, they present no evidence, and the pronouns do not match.

Evans and colleagues (2018) classify the Pahoturi River languages as an independent language family.

== Languages ==
Five of the varieties have traditionally been grouped into the following two language groups:

1. Agöb (Dabu), Ende, and Kawam
2. Idi and Taeme

Preliminary work on the language family suggests that these varieties form a dialect chain. It is assumed that Em is more closely related to Agob and Ende, while Idan and Idzuwe are more closely related to Idi and Taeme.

Pahoturi River languages and respective demographic information listed by Evans (2018) are provided below.

List of Pahoturi River languages
Language	Location	Population	Alternate names
Idi	central-east Morehead Rural LLG	774	
Taeme	northeast Morehead Rural LLG	834	Tame, Kondobol, Yao
Agob	southeast Morehead Rural LLG	1,437	Bugi, Dabu
Ende	east Morehead Rural LLG	542	
Kawam	east Morehead Rural LLG and west Oriomo-Bituri Rural LLG	457	Wipim

== Phonemes ==
Usher (2020) reconstructs the consonant inventory as follows:

*m	*mʷ	*n			*ŋ	[*ŋʷ]
*p	*pʷ	*t	*ʈ	*ts	*k	*kʷ
*b	*bʷ	*d	*ɖ	*dz	*g	*gʷ
*mb	*mbʷ	*nd	*ɳɖ	*ndz	*ŋg	*ŋgʷ
		*l	*ɭ			
	*w	*r	*ɽ	*j		

== Pronouns ==
The pronouns Ross reconstructs for the family are:

Proto-Pahoturi River

I	*ŋa-na	we	?
thou	*ba or *be	you	*-bi
s/he	*bo	they	?

Lindsey lists the following pronouns for each of the language varieties in the family.

Pahoturi River pronouns
Case	English	Agob	Em	Ende	Kawam	Idi	Taeme
Nominative	I (1sg)	ŋəna	ŋəna	ŋəna	ŋəna	ŋən	ŋən
Nominative	thou (2sg)	boŋo	boŋo	boŋo	buŋo	bæ	bæ
Nominative	s/he (3sg)	bo	bogo	bogo	bo	bo	bo
Nominative	we exclusive (1.nsg.excl)	ŋumi	ŋumi	ŋəmi	ŋəmi	ŋəmi/bi	bi
Nominative	we inclusive (1.nsg.incl)	ibi	ibi	ibi	ibi	jɪbi	jəbi
Nominative	you (2nsg)	bibi	bibi	bibi	bibi	bæ	bæ
Nominative	they (3nsg)	ubi	ubi	ubi	ubi	bo/wɪbi	bo/ubi
Accusative	I (1sg)	ŋənam	ŋənam	ŋənəm	ŋonom	bom	ŋənəm
Accusative	thou (2sg)	bæm	bæm	bam	bæm	babom	babom
Accusative	s/he (3sg)	obom	obom	obom	obom	obom	obom
Accusative	we exclusive (1.nsg.excl)	ŋənam	ŋumim	ŋəmim	ŋəmim	bim	ŋəmim
Accusative	we inclusive (1.nsg.incl)	ibom	ibam	ibim	ibim	jəbim	jɪbim
Accusative	you (2nsg)	bæm	bæm	bibim	bibim	bibim	bibim
Accusative	they (3nsg)	obam	obæm	ubim	ubim	ubim/wəbim	ubim
Dative	I (1sg)	ŋɵmɽe	ŋəmɽe	ŋəmɽe	ŋəmre	blæ	ŋəmʎæ
Dative	thou (2sg)	bæɽe	babɽe	babɽe	bæbre	bæblæ	bæbʎe
Dative	s/he (3sg)	obɽe	obɽe	obɽe	obo	oblæ	obʎe
Dative	we exclusive (1.nsg.excl)	ŋɵmra	ŋumra	ŋəmira	ŋəmira	bli	ŋəmʎi
Dative	we inclusive (1.nsg.incl)	ibra	ibra	ibra	ibra	jəbli	jɪbʎi
Dative	you (2nsg)	bæra	babra	bibra	bibra	bibli	bibʎi
Dative	they (3nsg)	obra	obra	ubira	ubira	ubli	ubʎi
Possessive	I (1sg)	ŋɵmo	ŋəmo	ŋəmo	ŋomo	bo/bænæ	ŋəmo
Possessive	thou (2sg)	bəne	bəne	bəne	bəne	bənæ	bənæ
Possessive	s/he (3sg)	obo	obo	obo	obo	obo/obænæ	obo
Possessive	we exclusive (1.nsg.excl)	ŋəma	ŋəma	ŋəma	ŋəma	ba	ŋəma
Possessive	we inclusive (1.nsg.incl)	iba	iba	iba	iba	jəba	jəba
Possessive	you (2nsg)	bina	bina	bina	bina	bəna	bəna
Possessive	they (3nsg)	oba	oba	oba	oba	oba	wəba

== Documentation status ==
The Pahoturi River languages are all under various states of documentation. The following table lists some general lexical, grammatical, textual, and typological resources that have been identified for each of the currently spoken Pahoturi River languages.

Lexical resources
Resource	Agob	Em	Ende	Idan	Idi	Kawam	Taeme
Yamfinder wordlist	1	1	4	N	2	3	1
Swadesh list	Y	N	N	N	Y	N	N
Dictionary	N	N	Y	N	Y	N	N

Textual resources
Resource	Agob	Em	Ende	Idan	Idi	Kawam	Taeme
Language data corpus (any)	Y	Y	Y	N	Y	Y	Y
North Wind and the Sun text	N	N	Y	N	Y	N	N
The Pear Story	N	N	N	N	N	N	N
Bible translation	N	N	Y (Mark)	N	N	Y (Mark)	Y (Luke)
Bible stories/Words of Life	Y	N	Y	N	Y	N	Y

Typological resources
Resource	Agob	Em	Ende	Idan	Idi	Kawam	Taeme
Leipzig Valency Questionnaire	N	N	Elicited the verbs in the Q, not online	N	Elicited the verbs in the Q, not online	N	N
Social Cognition Parallax Interview Corpus	N	N	5	N	Y	N	N
Grambank	N	N	Y	N	Y	N	N
Intercontinental Dictionary Series	N	N	Y	N	N	N	N
Numeral Systems of the World's Languages	N	N	Y	N	Y	N	Y
PR Verbal Number questionnaire	N	N	Y	N	Y	N	N
