= Nen language (Papuan) =

Yam language of Papua New Guinea

Nen
- Region: Western Province (Papua New Guinea)
- Native speakers: 350 (2018)
- Language family: Yam: Nambu; Nen

Language codes
- ISO 639-3: nqn
- Glottolog: nenn1238
- ELP: Nen

Nen (Nen Zi, Nenium, Wekamara) is a Yam language spoken in the Bimadbn village in the Western Province of Papua New Guinea, with 250 speakers as of a 2002 SIL survey. It is situated between the speech communities of Nambu and Idi.

Nen has unusual lexicalization patterns in its verbs. It has very few intransitive verbs, and where some verbs would be intransitive in most other languages, Nen has a class of morphologically "middle" verbs in their place. Many of the few intransitive verbs that Nen does have are positional verbs, which refer to spatial positions and postures.

== Phonology ==
The Nen phonemic inventory includes 22 consonants:

		Bilabial	Alveolar	Palatal	Velar	Labial-velar
Stop	voiceless	p	t		k	k͡p
Stop	voiced	b	d		ɡ	g͡b
Stop	prenasalized	ᵐb	ⁿd		ᵑɡ	
Nasal		m	n	ɲ		ŋ͡m
Fricative	voiceless		s			
Fricative	voiced		z			
Fricative	prenasalized		ⁿz			
Approximant	liquid		r l			
Approximant	semivowel			j		w

- /h/ occurs rarely in a few interactional and deictic words.

Vowels

	Front	Central	Back
Close	i		u
Near-close	ɪ		
Mid	e	(ə)	o
Near-open	æ		
Open		a	

- /ã, ẽ/ occur rarely in a few interactional and deictic words.

== Morphology ==
=== Number ===
The realization of different grammatical meanings of Number in the noun depends on the syntactic function and case marking. The noun in the dative overtly differentiates 4 grammatical meaning of number: singular, dual, paucal and plural; the noun in the oblique shows singular ~ dual ~ paucal/plural opposition, while the ergative − singular ~ dual/paucal ~ plural, and the noun in absolutive cannot be distinguished according to number.

=== Direction ===
The verb expresses three grammatical meaning of motion: neutral − /Ø-/, towards speaker /n-/, and away from speaker /ng-/: n-Ø-armbte '(s)he is ascending' ~ n-n-armbte '(s)he is coming up (towards speaker) ~ n-ng-armbte '(s)he is going up (away from speaker).

== Syntax ==
The constituent order in clause is SOV. Case marking shows ergative/absolutive alignment.

=== Argument structure and valency ===
According to indexing, the verbs can be either prefixing (an undergoer argument is cross-referenced by a prefix) or ambifixing (arguments are cross-referenced by both prefix and suffix in the verb). In the transitive predicate, a verbal prefix expresses patient and a verbal suffix − actor. There are several types of valency pattern in Nen:

1. Basically monovalent pattern

- Basic intransitive − NP_{abs} U-V
- Intrinsic middle − NP_{abs} M-V-A
- Middle with cognate object − NP_{abs} + NP_{abs} M-V-A

2. Basically divalent pattern

- Basic transitive − NP_{erg} + NP_{abs} U-V-A
- Experiencer object construction − NP_{abs} > NP_{erg} U-V-A_{3sg}
- Transitive verbs with deponent middle verbal morphology − N_{perg} + NP_{abs} M-V-A
- Semi-transitive verb registering oblique on undergoer slot − NP_{erg} + NP_{obl} U-V-A

3. Trivalent pattern

The arguments get the following case marking: the subject − ergative, the direct object − absolutive, and the indirect object − dative. In a trivalent predicate, the indirect object argument (semantically, recipient) is cross-referenced in the verb by the undergoer prefix.

=== Causative ===
Middle verbs form their causative using a prefix /wa-/, which may be glossed 'to cause (motion/trajectory) through sustained contact (carrying, leading etc.)'. The resulting form follows ergative syntax.

=== Benefactive ===
Beneficiary is expressed by the undergoer prefix.
