= Nambo-Namna language =

Yam language spoken in Papua New Guinea

Nambo-Namna
- Nambu
- Region: Western Province (Papua New Guinea)
- Native speakers: 710 (2018)
- Language family: Yam: Nambu; Nambo-Namna
- Dialects: Nambo; Namna

Language codes
- ISO 639-3: ncm
- Glottolog: namb1293

Nambo-Namna is a Yam language spoken in Western Province, Papua New Guinea. The two varieties are mutually intelligible. They are,

- Nambo (Nmbo, Nambu, Nombuio, Tanjuamu, Keraki)
- Namna (Tendavi)
