= Trans-Fly–Bulaka River languages =

Hypothetical family of Papuan languages

Trans-Fly–Bulaka River
- South-Central Papuan
- Geographic distribution: New Guinea
- Linguistic classification: Proposed language family
- Subdivisions: Bulaka River; Waia; Pahoturi; Yam

Language codes
- Glottolog: None
- Map: The Trans-Fly–Bulaka River languages of New Guinea The Trans-Fly–Bulaka River languages Trans–New Guinea languages Other Papuan languages Austronesian languages Australian languages Uninhabited

The Trans-Fly–Bulaka River aka South-Central Papuan languages form a hypothetical family of Papuan languages. They include many of the languages west of the Fly River in southern Papua New Guinea into southern Indonesian West Papua, plus a pair of languages on the Bulaka River a hundred km further west.

The family was posited by Stephen Wurm as a branch of his 1975 Trans–New Guinea proposal. Wurm thought it likely that many of these languages would prove not to belong to Trans–New Guinea, but rather to have been heavily influenced by Trans–New Guinea languages. Malcolm Ross (2005) concurred, and removed most of them.

== Classification ==
None of the families are closely related; indeed, it is difficult to demonstrate a link between any of them. Wurm's 1975 TNG branch included the following eight demonstrated families:

- Kiwaian, on the banks and east of the Fly River
- Waia, north of the Fly delta
- Tirio, on the western bank of the Fly River
- Eastern Trans-Fly languages, south of the Fly delta
- Pahoturi, west of the Eastern languages
- Yam, up to and just across the Indonesian border
- Moraori, between Upper Maro and the Marind language
- Bulaka River, west of Marind

Ross (2005) accepted the TNG identity of Tirio, Moraori, and, tentatively, Kiwaian. He split off the four Eastern Trans-Fly languages as an independent family. The remainder of the family, which he calls South-Central Papuan, is only tentatively retained: their pronouns are suggestive of a relationship, but this has not been demonstrated.

- Trans-Fly–Bulaka River (South-Central Papuan)
  - Bulaka River family
  - - Pahoturi family
    - Waia isolate
  - Yam (Morehead – Upper Maro) family

A more conservative approach would break up Wurm's Trans-Fly–Bulaka River entirely, with two or three of the families remaining within Trans–New Guinea, and five or six being independent. Evans (2012), for example, argues that the inclusion of the Yam language at least is not justified on present evidence. Timothy Usher treats the Bulaka River and Yam languages as separate families, and links the Pahoturi– clade to the Eastern Trans-Fly languages.

=== Southern New Guinea linguistic area ===
A Southern New Guinea linguistic area, which spans both Indonesia and Papua New Guinea, consisting of the following families is mentioned in Evans (2018).

- Yelmek-Maklew - 500 speakers
- Yam (Morehead-Upper Maro) - 3,000 speakers
- Pahoturi River - just over 4,000 speakers
- Oriomo (Eastern Trans-Fly) - 6,500 speakers
- Trans-New Guinea (TNG)
  - Kolopom - just over 7,000 speakers
  - Marori - fewer than 20 elderly speakers
  - Gogodala-Suki - 30,000 speakers
  - Kiwaian - 37,000 speakers
  - Anim
    - Marindic - 10,000 speakers
    - Tirio (Lower Fly)
    - Ipiko (Inland Gulf)

Languages within the Southern New Guinea linguistic area generally share these typological features.

- lack of tone (except Kuni-Boazi, possibly Marind, and some Kiwai dialects)
- complex verb morphology
- limited or no gender (except for the four-way gender system in Anim languages, and the masculine vs. feminine contrast on undergoer-prefixes in the Tonda languages and some Oriomo languages)
- lack of verb chaining or switch-reference
- single-word verbs form an open class

== Pronouns ==
The pronouns Ross reconstructs for the three families he keeps together are suggestively similar, but it has not been possible to reconstruct common forms:

Proto-Yam (Proto–Morehead – Upper Maro)

I/we	*ni
you	*bu
s/he/they	*be

Proto-Pahoturi

I	*ŋa-na	we	?
thou	*ba or *be	you	*-bi
s/he	*bo	they	?

Proto-Bulaka River

I	*ŋöl	we	*ŋag
thou	*ob	you	*el
s/he	*ib	they	*im

== See also ==
- Trans-Fly languages
