= Indigenous people of New Guinea =

Melanesian inhabitants of New Guinea

Papuans
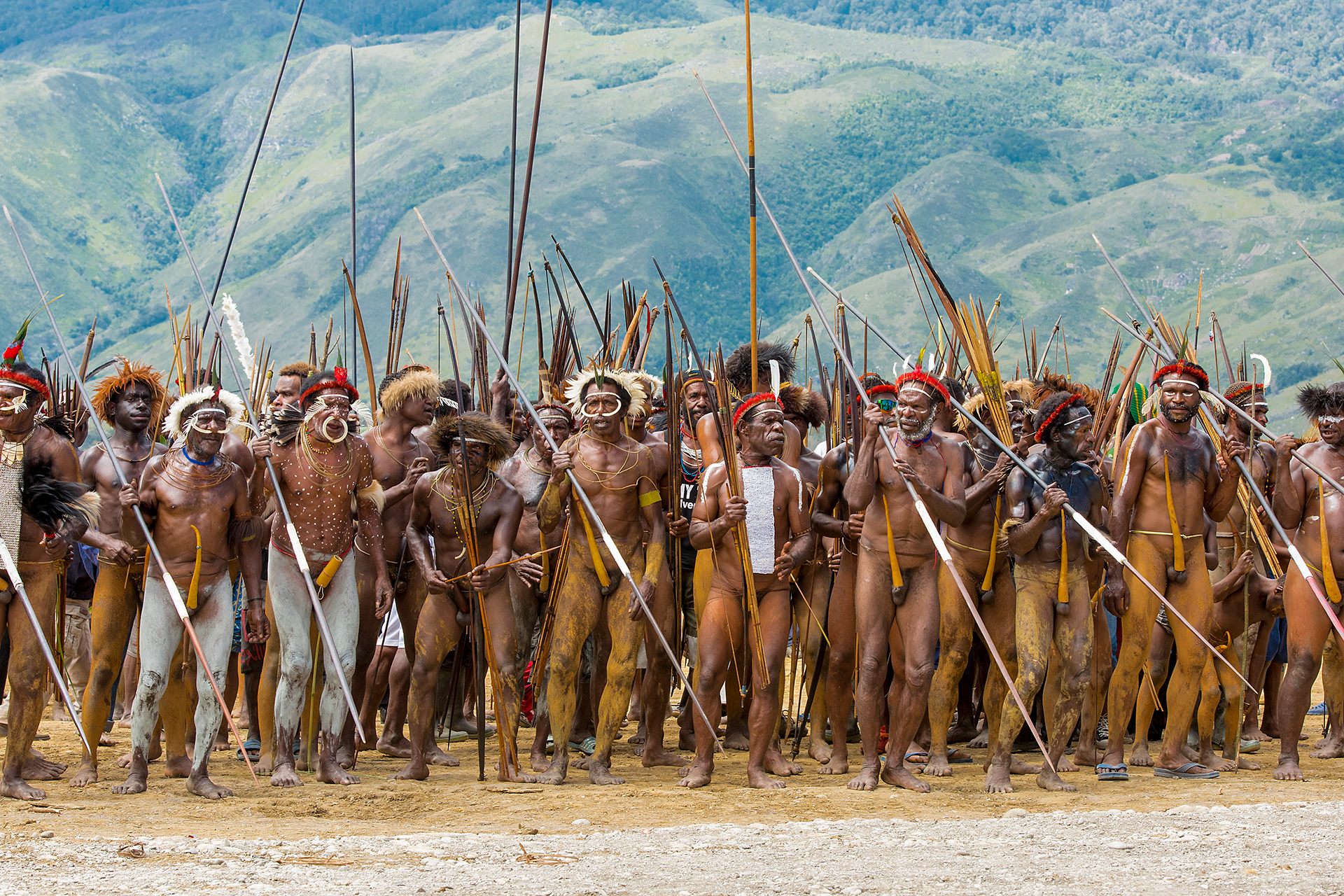
- Dani people from the central highlands of Western New Guinea, Indonesia.

Total population
- 14,800,000

Regions with significant populations
- New Guinea (Papua): Papua New Guinea (Indonesia) Western New Guinea; Diaspora: Australia; United States; Canada; Netherlands; Singapore

Languages
- Languages of Papua: Native Papuan languages and Austronesian languages Lingua francas (in Papua New Guinea): English, Tok Pisin, Hiri Motu, and Unserdeutsch; Lingua francas (in Indonesian Papua): Indonesian and Papuan Malay

Religion
- Christianity, Islam, and native Papuan religions

Related ethnic groups
- Other Melanesians, Ambonese, Moluccans, Aboriginal Australians

The Indigenous peoples of Papua New Guinea and of Western New Guinea in Indonesia, commonly called Papuans, are Melanesians. There is genetic evidence for two major historical lineages in New Guinea and neighboring islands: a first wave from the Malay Archipelago perhaps 50,000 years ago when New Guinea and Australia were a single landmass called Sahul and, much later, a wave of Austronesian people from the north who introduced Austronesian languages and pigs about 3,500 years ago. They also left a small but significant genetic trace in many coastal Papuan peoples.

Linguistically, Papuans speak languages from the many families of non-Austronesian languages that are found only on New Guinea and neighboring islands, as well as Austronesian languages along parts of the coast, and recently developed creoles such as Tok Pisin, Hiri Motu, Unserdeutsch, and Papuan Malay.

The term "Papuan" is used in a wider sense in linguistics and anthropology. In linguistics, "Papuan languages" is a cover term for the diverse, mutually unrelated, non-Austronesian language families spoken in Melanesia, the Torres Strait Islands, and parts of Wallacea. In anthropology, "Papuan" is often used to denote the highly diverse aboriginal populations of Melanesia and Wallacea prior to the arrival of Austronesian-speakers, and the dominant genetic traces of these populations in the current ethnic groups of these areas.

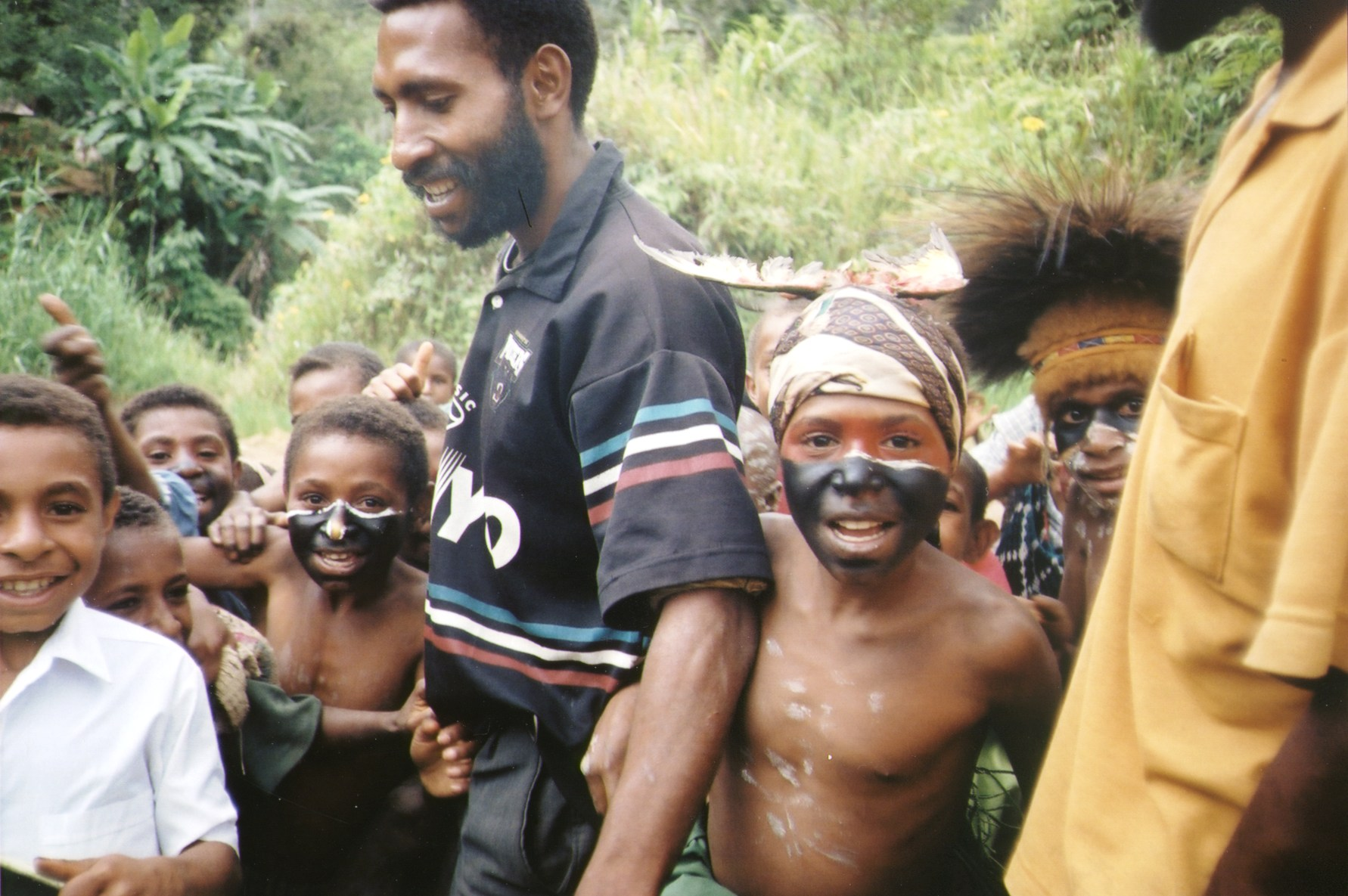
Children dressed up for sing‑sing in Papua New Guinea.

== Languages ==
The language families in Ross's conception of the Trans-New Guinea language family.

Ethnologue's 14th edition lists 826 languages of Papua New Guinea and 257 languages of Western New Guinea, a total of 1083 languages, with 12 languages overlapping. If we adopt the figure proposed by Glottolog for Papua New Guinea, namely 928 languages, the total is even higher. This corresponds to 15% of the world's 7700 languages.

In terms of linguistic families, the indigenous languages of New Guinea can be divided into two groups: 283 languages belong to the Austronesian family, and the other 858 are non-Austronesian—a grouping commonly described as "Papuan languages" for convenience.

The term Papuan languages refers to an areal grouping, rather than a linguistic one. So-called "Papuan" languages are distributed into as many as eighty unrelated linguistic phyla, including 43 families and 37 isolates.

== Origin and genetics ==
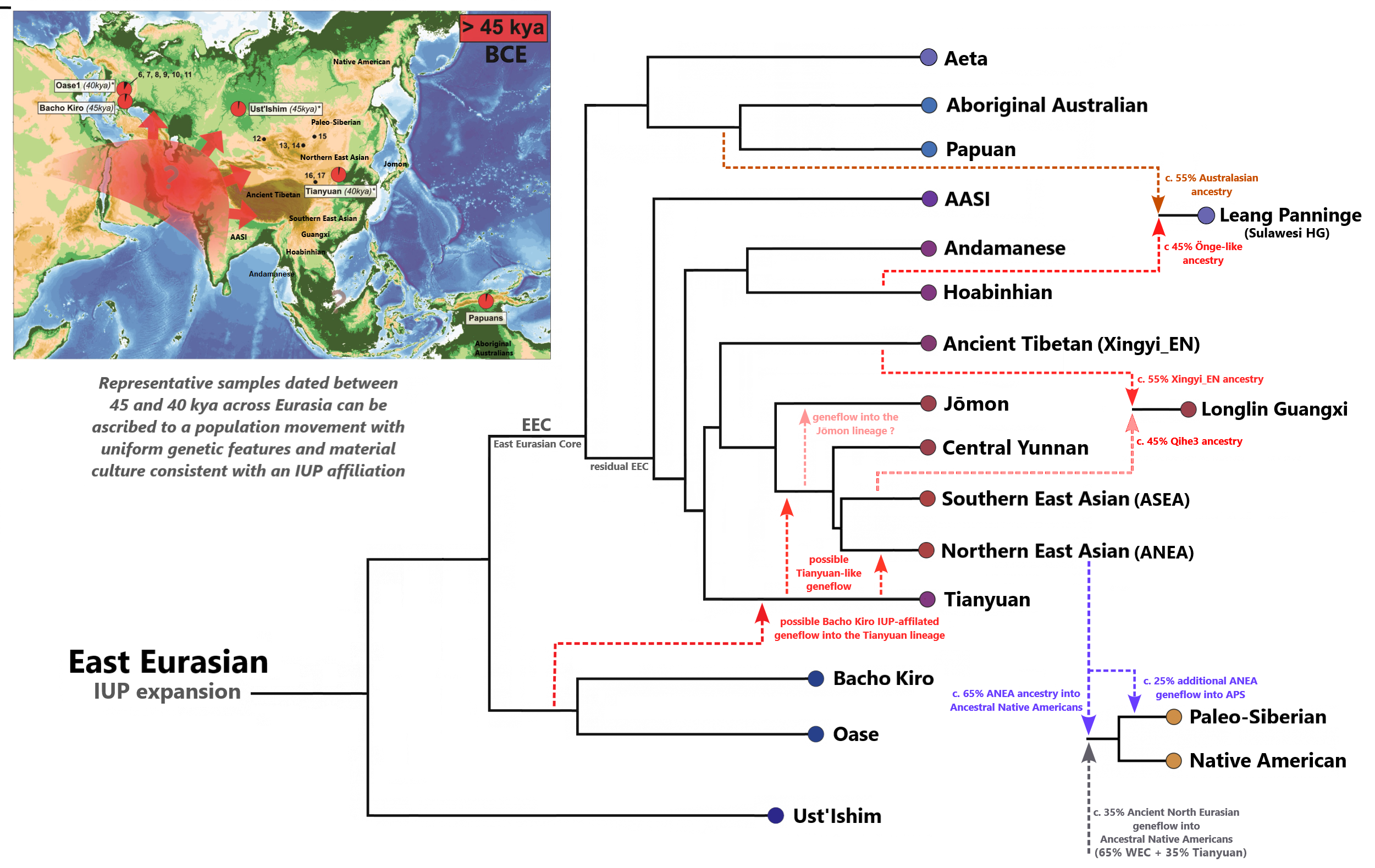
Phylogenetic position of the Papuan lineage among other East Eurasians.

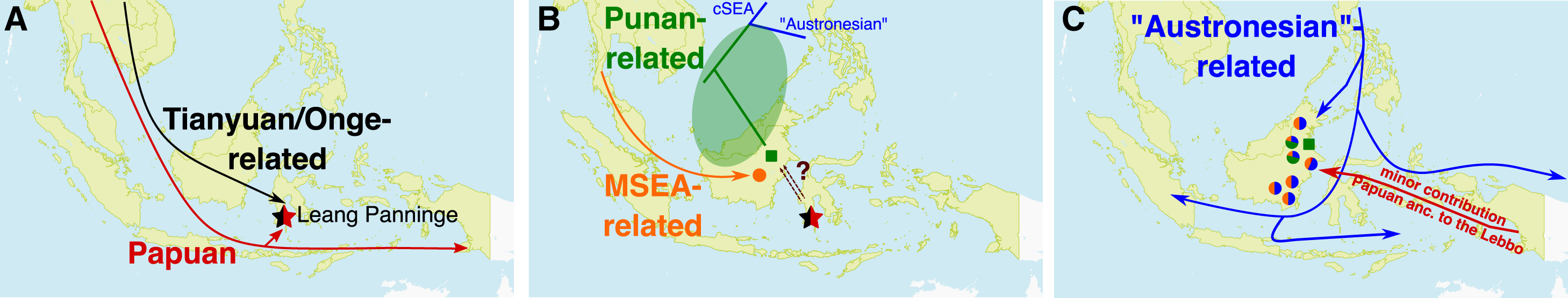
Schematic summary of population settlement in Insular Southeast Asia, involving several East Eurasian lineages: (A) Initial occupation of Sunda and Sahul by ancestry related to modern New Guinean and Australian Aboriginal populations, followed by deep mainland Asian (Tianyuan- or Onge-related) ancestry. (B) Dispersals of ancestries associated with ancient Mainland Southeast Asian and ancestral Punan-related components predating the coastal South Chinese, and hence Austronesian-related, ancestries. (C) Austronesian expansion leading to Austronesian (Ami- and Kankanaey-related) ancestry observed in NE and SE Borneans and subsequent specific Papuan ancestry admixture observed in the Lebbo population in East Borneo.

The origin of Papuans is generally associated with the first settlement of Australasia by a lineage dubbed "Australasians" or "Australo-Papuans" during the Initial Upper Paleolithic, which is "ascribed to a population movement with uniform genetic features and material culture" (Ancient East Eurasians), and sharing deep ancestry with modern East Asian peoples and other Asia-Pacific groups. It is estimated that people reached Sahul (the geological continent consisting of Australia and New Guinea) between 37,000 and 50,000 years ago. Rising sea levels separated New Guinea from Australia about 10,000 years ago. However, Aboriginal Australians and Papuans had diverged genetically much earlier, around 40,000 years BP. Papuans are more closely related to Melanesians than to Aboriginal Australians.

=== Haplogroups ===
The majority of Papuan Y-DNA haplogroups belong to subclades of haplogroup MS, and haplogroup C1b2a. The frequency of each haplogroup varies along geographic clines.

=== Autosomal DNA ===
The genetic makeup of Papuans is primarily derived from Ancient East Eurasians, which relates them to other mainland Asian groups such as the Ancient Ancestral South Indians (AASI), Andamanese, as well as East and Southeast Asians, although there is possible gene flow from an earlier Out-of-Africa (xOoA) group, around 2%, next to additional archaic Denisovan admixture in the Sahul region. Papuans may harbor varying degrees of deep admixture from "a lineage basal to West and East Asians occurred sometimes between 45 and 38 ka," although they are generally regarded "as a simple sister group of Tianyuan" ("Basal East Asians"). They are also closely related to Andamanese Onge and East Asians and mainly differ due to their Denisovan admixture. One study states that the Papuans diverged from other East Eurasians before Tianyuan-related populations. It is suggested that Papuans may have undergone a secondary admixture event with Altai-related Denisovan populations after they diverged from the ancestors of East Asians, who already mixed with Denisovans. This event was separate from the admixture event experienced by Filipino Negritos, explaining why Papuans have relatively lower Denisovan ancestry. Potential genetic input from a "super-archaic" human lineage, which diverged from the ancestors of modern humans and the ancestor of Neanderthals and Denisovans, may also found within the Denisovan ancestry of Papuans. According to a 2025 study, Papuans are a sister group to East Asians with no genetic input from earlier Out-of-African populations. They diverged from Europeans about 51,200 years ago, from East Asians about 46,200 years ago, and mixed with Denisovans about 31,200 years ago, contributing to about 3.23% of their genetic makeup. Compared to Europeans and East Asians, Papuans also experienced severe bottlenecking.

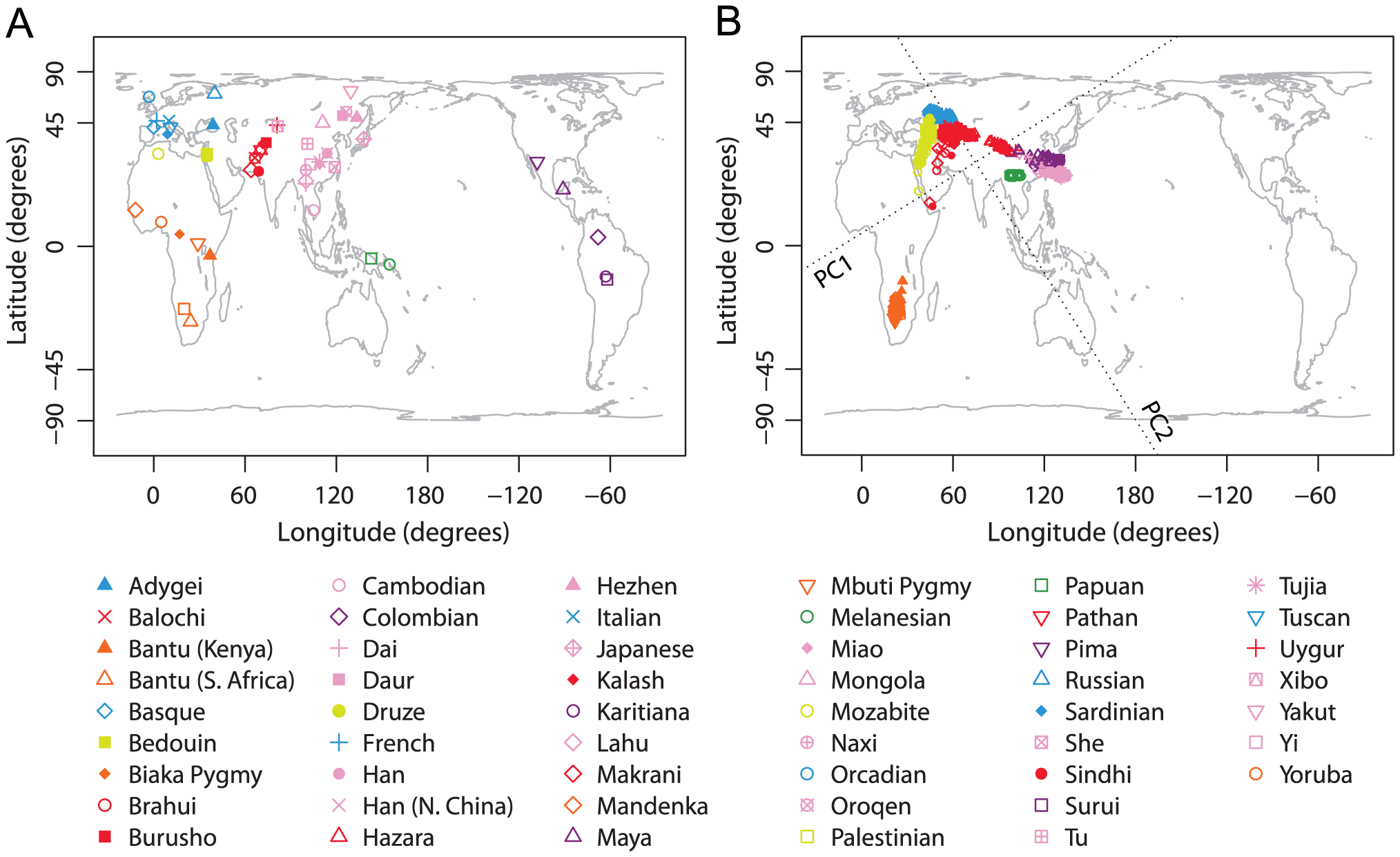
PCA plot of genetic variation of worldwide populations. Papuans (green) cluster relative close to other East Eurasians, such as East and Southeast Asians.

Papuans display pronounced genetic diversity, explained through isolation and drift between different subgroups after the settlement of New Guinea. The most notable differentiation was found to be between Highlanders and Lowlanders. Papuan Highlanders fall into three clusters, but form a single clade compared against Lowlanders. The Highlanders underwent a population bottleneck around 10,000 years ago, associated with the adoption of Neolithic lifestyles. Papuan Lowlanders display increased diversity and can be broadly differentiated into a Southern Lowlander cluster and a Northern Lowlander cluster. The genetic differentiation among Papuans is suggested to date back at least 20,000 years ago, while the sub-structure among Highlanders dates back around 10,000 years ago, with higher diversity among western Highlanders than Eastern ones. The genetic diversity is paralleled by linguistic and cultural diversity. East Asian-related admixture is also observed in some modern Papuans, especially coastal Papuan groups.

Based on a reevaluation of mitogenomes, Gandini et al. 2025 proposed a "long chronology," which suggested an earlier settlement of Sahul by two migration routes around 60,000 years ago. One route came from northern Sunda via the Philippine archipelago whilst the other came from southern Sunda via Mainland Southeast Asia, with both routes ultimately tracing back to South Asia. The settlers that undertook these routes were ancestral to populations indigenous to Australia, New Guinea and Oceania, and related to other East Eurasians instead of belonging to a separate wave. The genetic divergence between the indigenous inhabitants of Sahul and Sunda was also believed to be ancient and rapid.

=== Archaic introgression ===
Based on his genetic studies of the Denisova hominin, an ancient human species discovered in 2010, Svante Pääbo claims that ancient human ancestors of the Papuans interbred in Asia with these humans. He has found that people of New Guinea share 4–7% of their genome with the Denisovans, indicating this exchange. Denisovan introgressions may have influenced the immune system of present-day Papuans and potentially favoured "variants to immune-related phenotypes" and "adaptation to the local environment."

=== ASPM gene ===
In a 2005 study of Abnormal Spindle-like, Microcephaly (ASPM) gene variants, Nitzan Mekel-Bobrov et al. found that the Papuan people have among the highest rate of the newly evolved ASPM Haplogroup D, at 59.4% occurrence of the approximately 6,000-year-old allele. While it is not yet known exactly what selective advantage is provided by this gene variant, the haplogroup D allele is thought to be positively selected in populations and to confer some substantial advantage that has caused its frequency to rapidly increase.

== Papuan ethnic groups ==
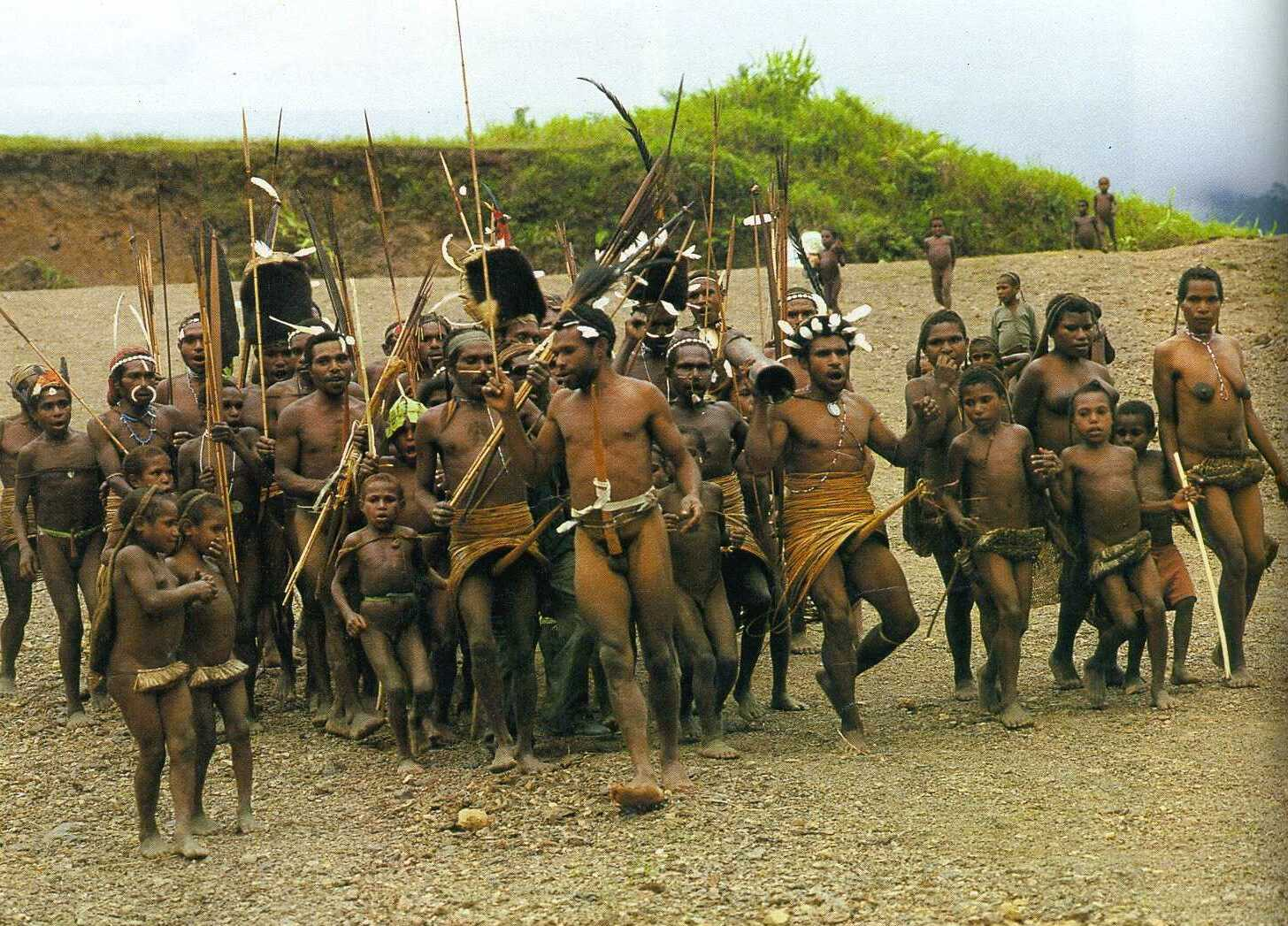
Yali in the Yahukimo Regency, Indonesia

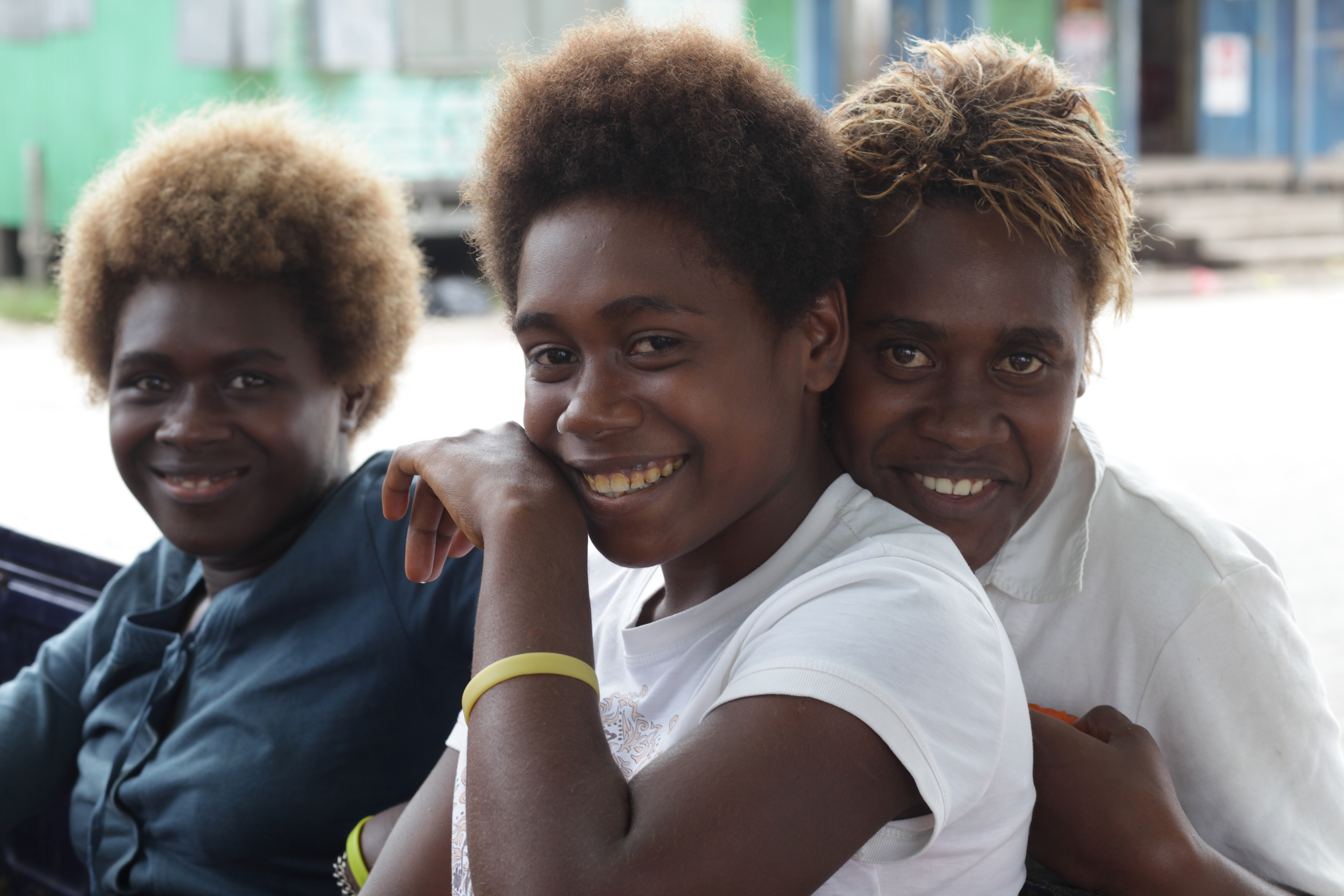
Melanesian girls from Papua New Guinea

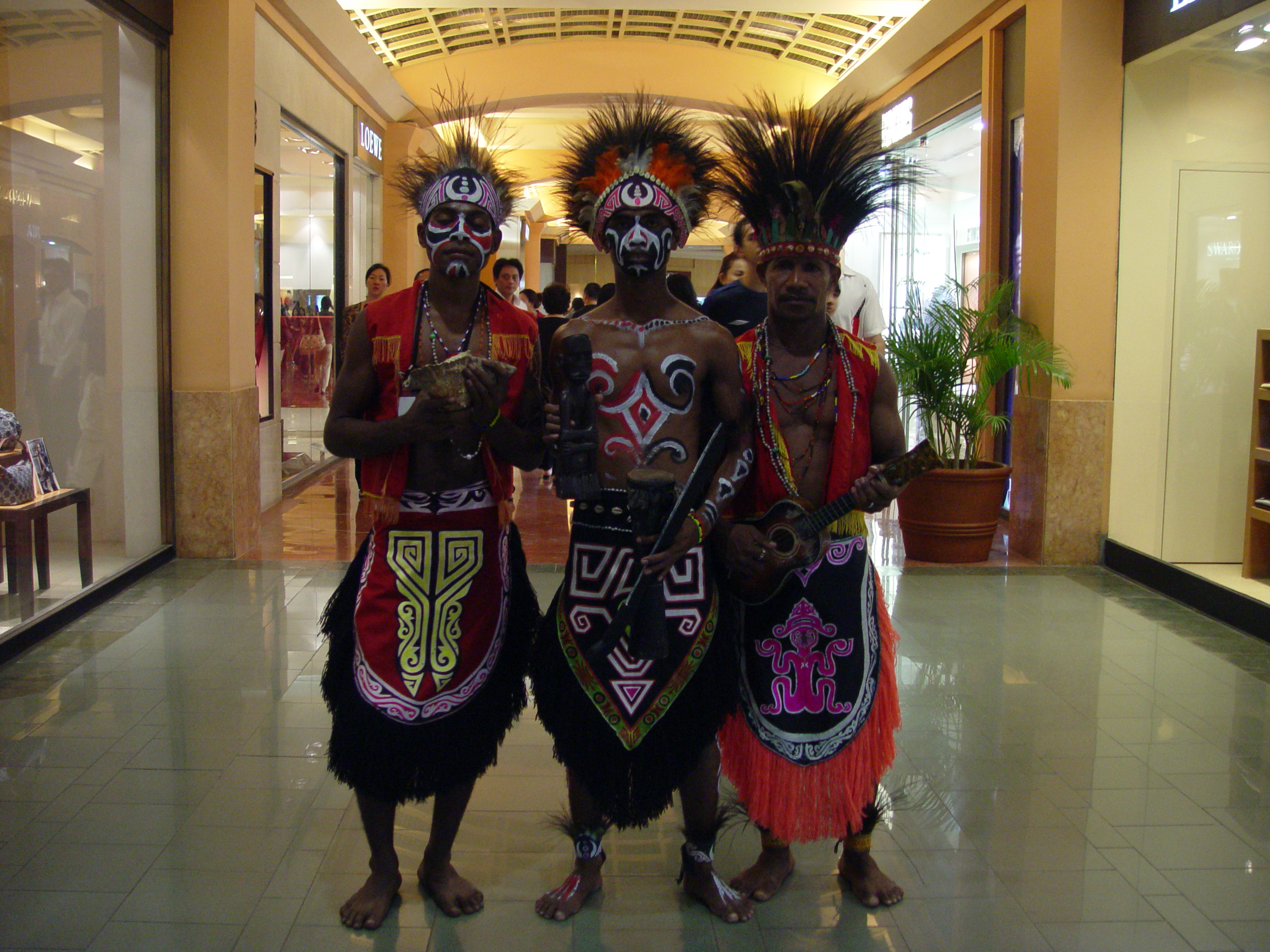
Papuan people in folk dress in Jakarta

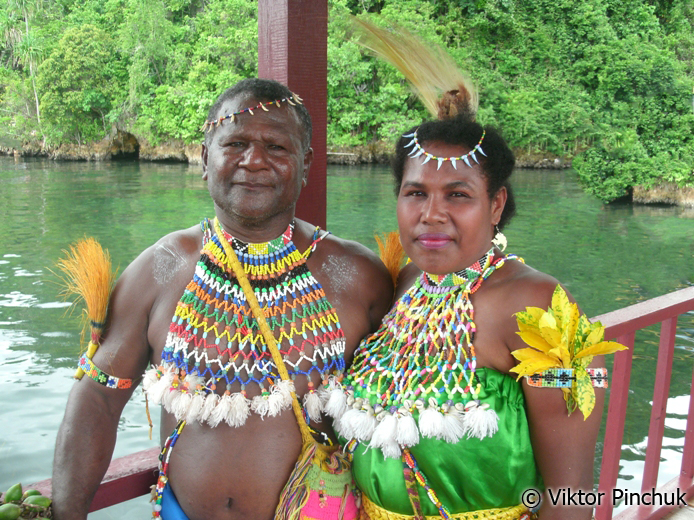
Newly married Kayu Batu couple in Jayapura, Indonesia

The following indigenous peoples live within the modern borders of Indonesia and Papua New Guinea. Austronesian-speaking (AN) groups are given in italics.

=== Indonesia ===
==== West Papua ====
Papuan ethnic groups/tribes in the Indonesian province of West Papua include: Arfak (Hatam, Meyah, Moile, dan Sougb), Borai, Numfor-Doreri, Irarutu, Koiwai, Kuri, Madewana, Mairasi, Maniwak, Mbaham-Matta, Miere, Moru, Moskona, Napiti, Oburauw, Roon, Roswar, Sebyar (Damban-Kimbaran), Soviar, Sumuri, Wamesa, Warumba, Waruri, Wondama.

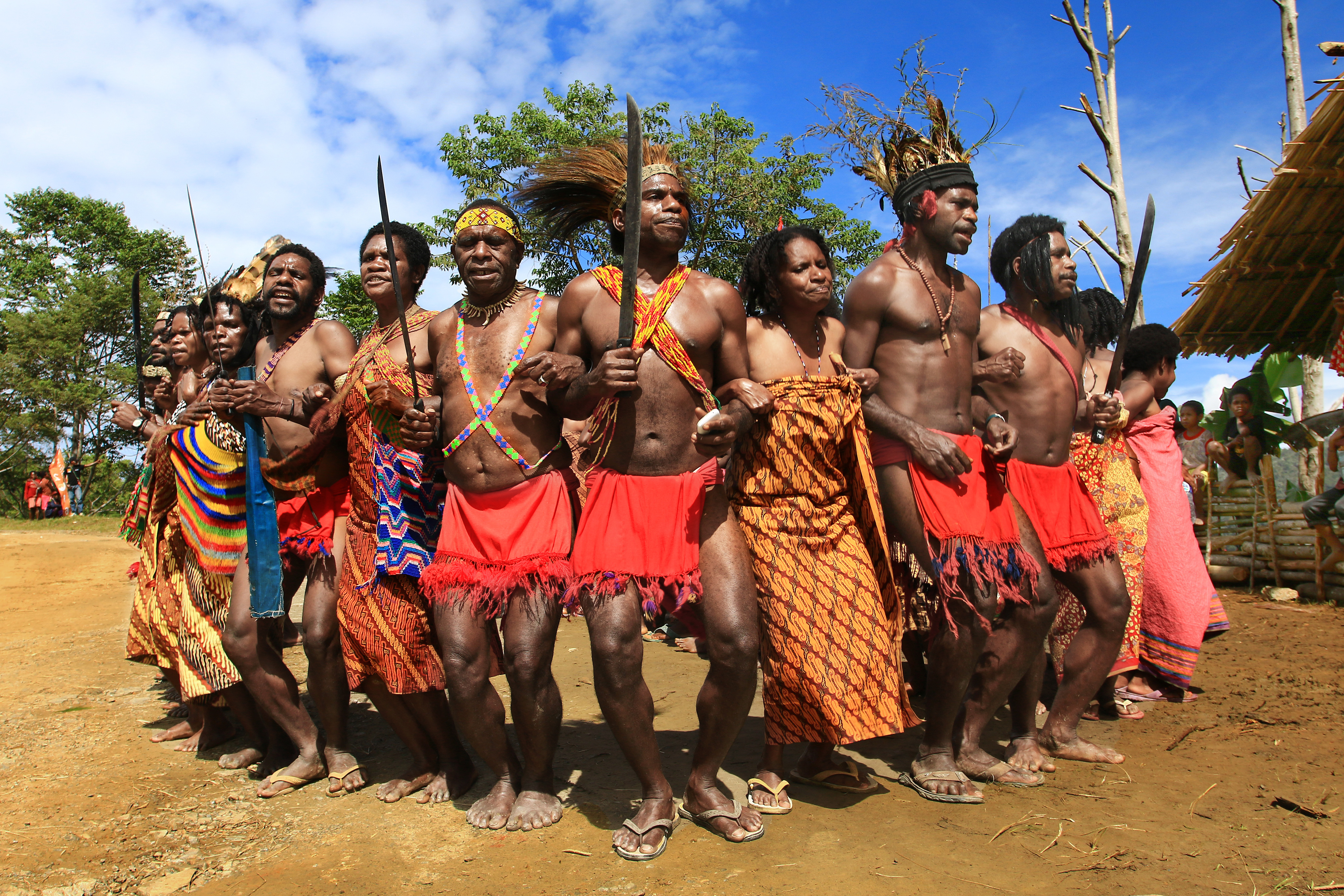
Magasa dance of the Arfak people

==== Southwest Papua ====
Papuan ethnic groups/tribes in the Indonesian province of Southwest Papua include Abun, Ambel, Batanta, Biak (Betew, Kafdaron, Karon, Usba, Wardo), Biga, Butlih, Domu, Duriankere, Gebe (Gag), Fiawat, Imekko (Inanwatan-Bira, Matemani-Iwaro, Kais, Awe, Kokoda-Emeyode), Irires, Ma'ya (Kawe, Laganyan, Wawiyai), Matbat-Matlow, Maybrat (Ayamaru, Mare, Karon Dori-Miyah, Aifat, Aitinyo, Wayer), Moi-Ma'ya, Moi, Mpur, Nerigo, Tehit, Tepin, Yahadian, Yaben-Konda.

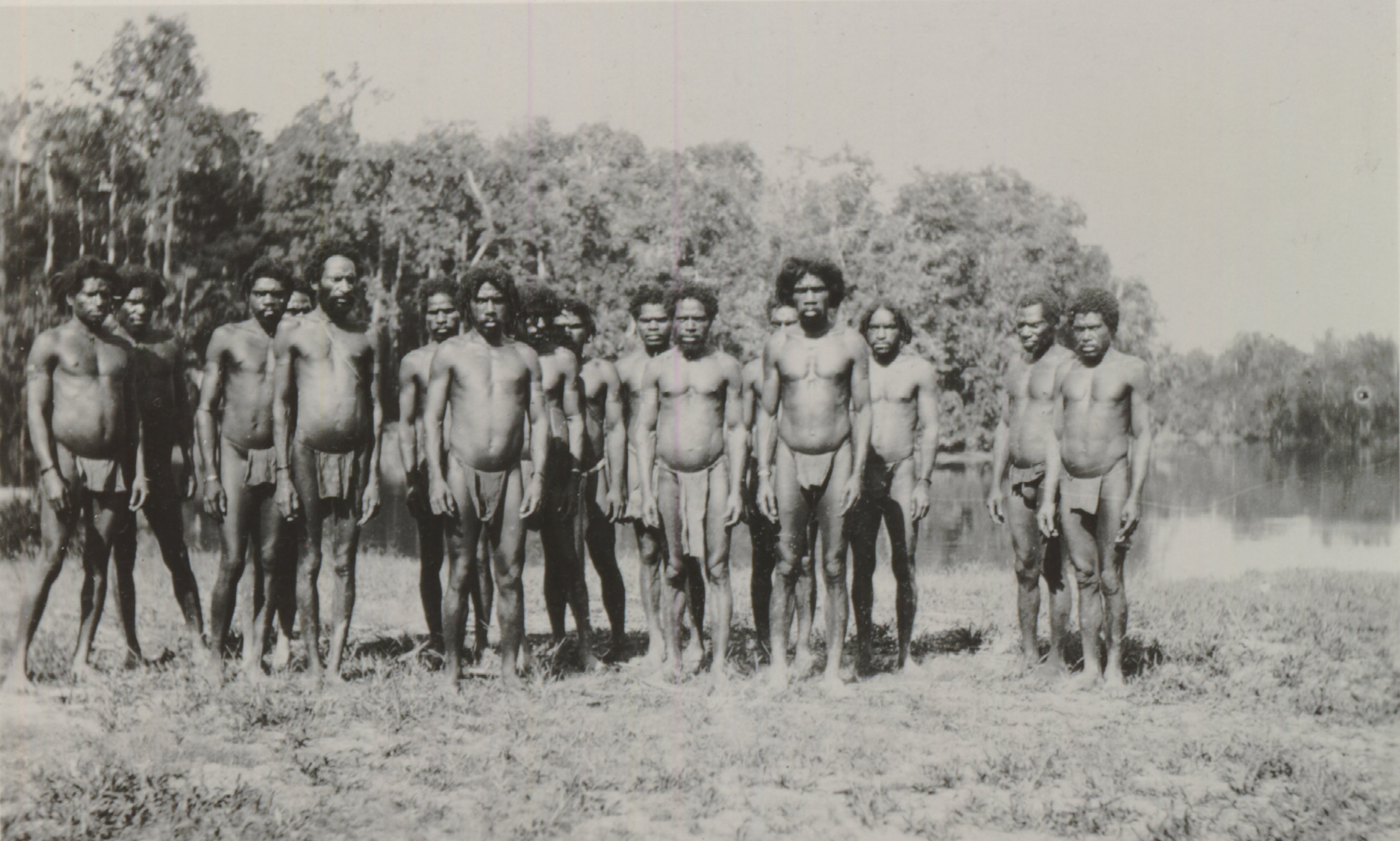
The Maybrat people near Lake Ayamaru, 1930s

==== Papua ====
Papuan ethnic groups/tribes in the Indonesian province of Papua include:

Jayapura City	Kayu Batu/Kayu Pulau; Tobati; Enggros; Nafri; Skouw; Sentani; Wutung
Jayapura Regency	Demta; Kaureh; Kemtuk; Kawamsu; Mekwei; Narau; Gresi; Nimboran; Oria; Ormu; Kapori; Foya; Sauso; Tabla; Tarpia; Taworfa; Yansu; Yamna; Kendate; Tofamna; Bauwi; Sentani
Sarmi Regency	Aikwaikai; Airoran; Anus; Baburiwa; Bagusa; Yarsun; Bapu; Bonerif; Lairawa; Kauweraweo; Mander; Papasena; Wakde; Baso; Bonggo; Itik; Keder; Maremgi; Podena; Marembori; Babe; Kabera; Kwerba; Masimasi; Samarokena; Wares; Berik; Dabra; Kwesten; Massep; Sobei; Warotai; Betaf; Foau; Kapitiauw; Liki; Nopuk
Keerom Regency	Awibyakwa; Awyi; Dera; Dubu; Emem; Fermanggem; Janggu; Taikat; Yafi; Manem; Sowei; Molof; Usku; Emumu; Sangke; Waina; Senggi; Waris; Walsa; Yetfa
Biak Numfor Regency	Borapasi; Bonefa; Kofei; Sauri; Siromi; Tafaro; Waropen; Wairata; Burate; Sedasi; Otodema; Demisa; Demba; Biak
Waropen Regency	Amabi; Ansus; Busami; Karema; Kurudu; Marau; Munggui; Nisa; Papuma; Pom; Arui; Woi; Anate; Nakabui; Waropen
Yapen Islands Regency	Borapasi; Bonefa; Kofei; Kurudu; Kaipuri; Sauri; Siromi; Tafaro; Waropen; Wairata; Burate; Sedasi; Otodema; Demisa; Demba
Mamberamo Raya Regency	Bauzi; Duvle; Tauraf

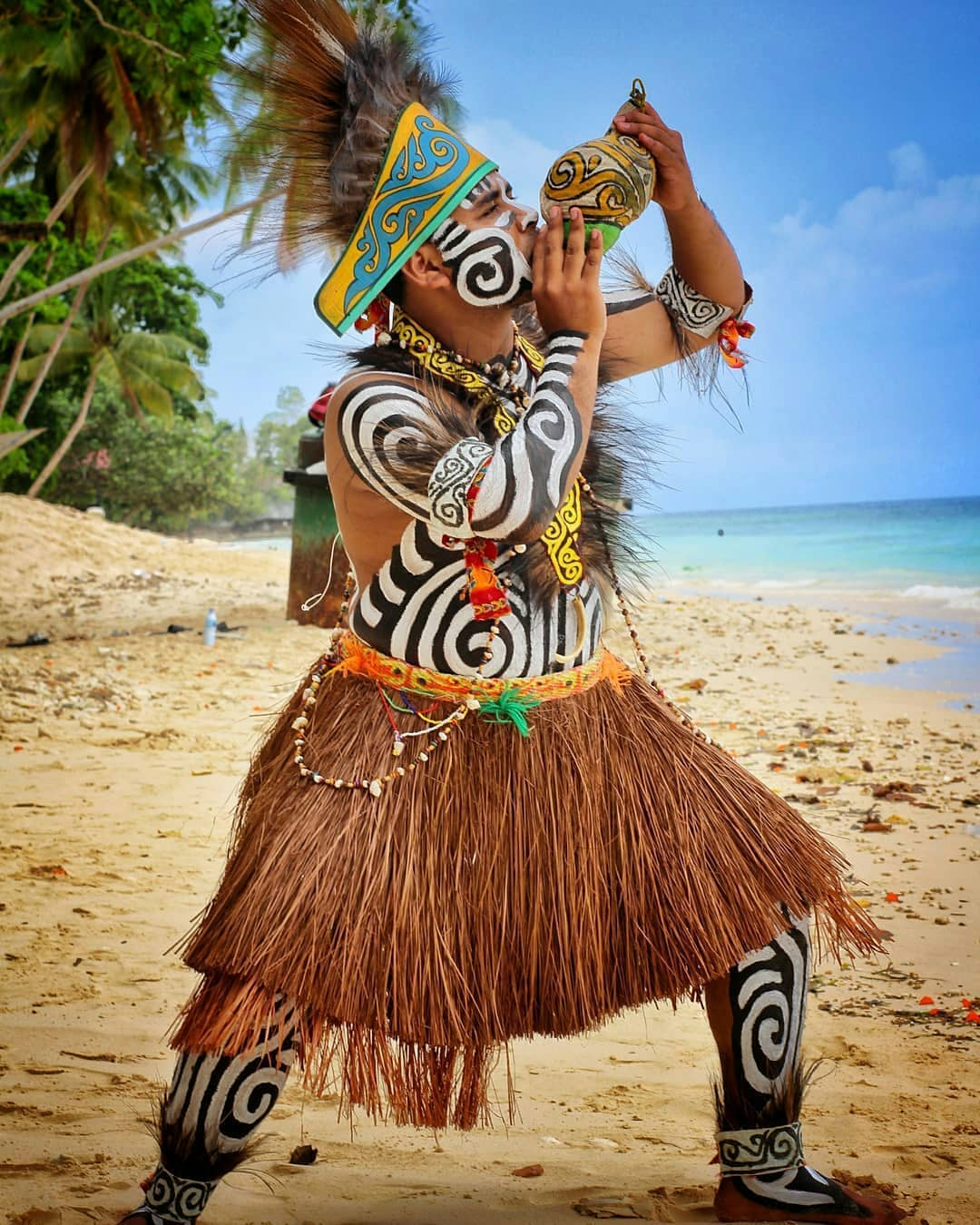
A Biak man wearing his traditional clothes

==== Highland Papua ====
Papuan ethnic groups/tribes in the Indonesian province of Highland Papua include:

Jayawijaya Regency	Nduga; Walak; Dani (Hugula · Hubula · Huwula/Huwulra · Hubla)
Nduga Regency	Nduga
Yalimo Regency	Yali (Apahapsili · Abenaho · Gilika)
Pegunungan Bintang Regency	Arintap; Biksi; Eipomek; Mek; Ngalum; Ketengban; Yetfa; Lepki; Murop; Kimki; Pyu; Una
Tolikara Regency	Taori; Kwerisa; Toarikei; Turu; Lani
Yahukimo Regency	Yali (Yalimek/Inlom · Angguruk · Ninia); Hupla (Soba); Kimyal (Korupun-Sela); Momuna (Samboga · Intamaja); Una; Mek (Nalca/Hmanggona · Nipsan · Kosarek); Ngalik (Silimo); Obini; Korowai (Arubkor · Klufo); Obukain (Diuwe); Kopkaka (Seredala · Kwer · Tokuni/Dajub · Burumakok); Awban (Bese)

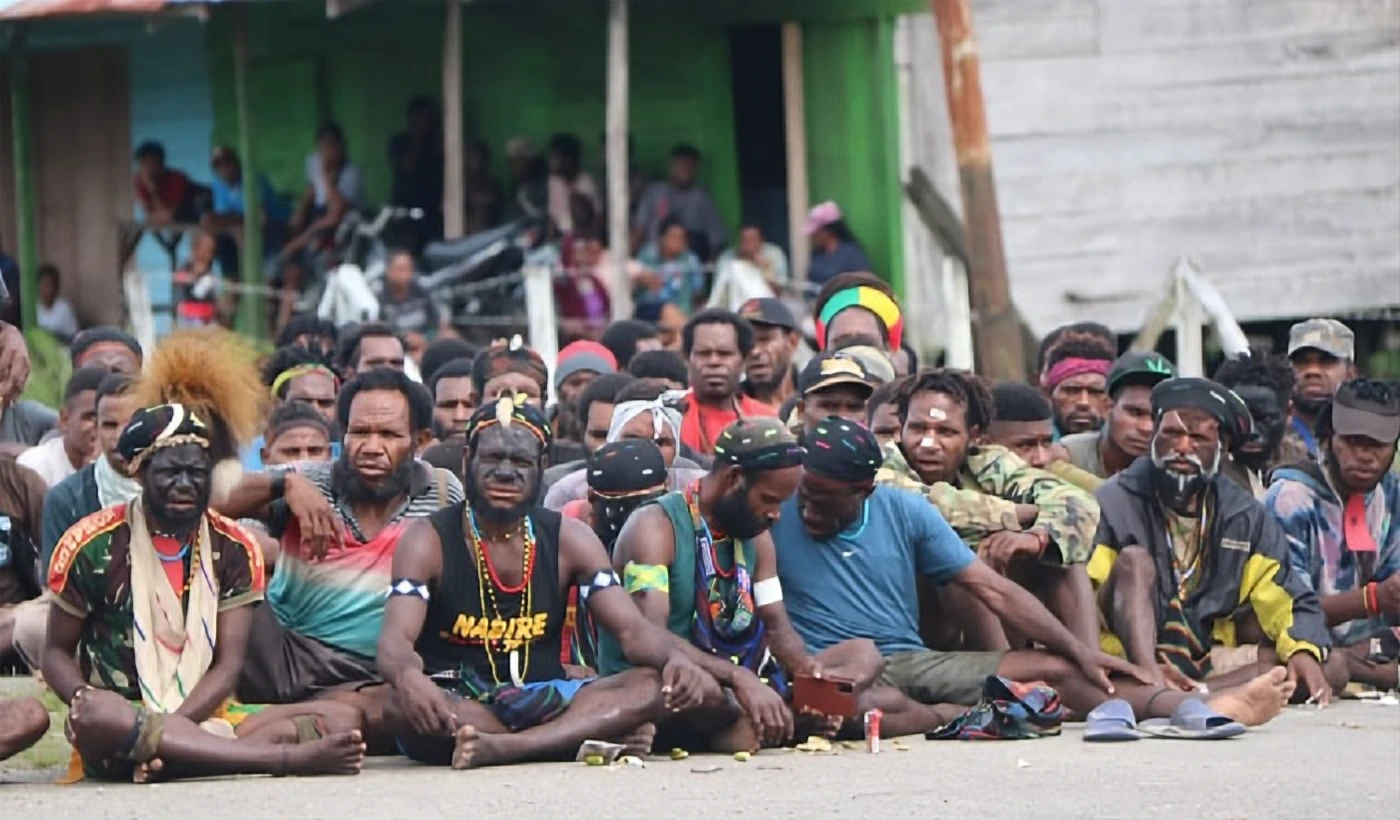
Nduga people gather in Kenyam for peace in ethnic conflict.

==== Central Papua ====
Papuan ethnic groups/tribes in the Indonesian province of Central Papua include:

Deiyai Regency	Mee; Kamoro
Dogiyai Regency	Mee
Intan Jaya Regency	Dao (Auye); Moni; Wolani; Nduga
Mimika Regency	Kamoro; Sempan; Damal; Amungme
Nabire Regency	Yerisiam Gua; Wate; Mora; Yaur; Umari; Mee; Napan (Auye)
Paniai Regency	Dao (Auye); Mee; Moni; Wolani
Puncak Regency	Amungme; Dou (Edopi); Damal; Dani Atas; Dem; Fayu; Nduga; Kirikiri; Lani; Tause; Turu; Wano
Puncak Jaya Regency	Dani Atas; Dem; Duvle; Lani; Nduga; Turu; Wano

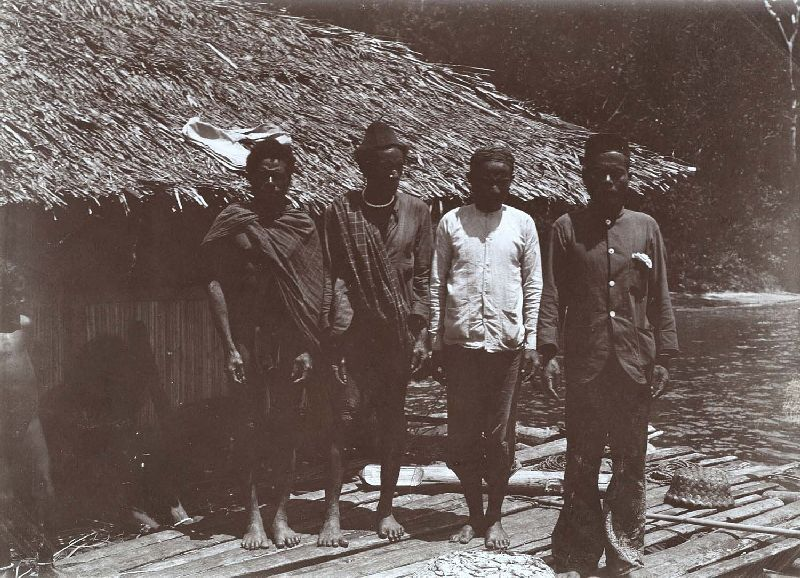
Four Yaur men, including one korano (village head) in Kwatisore

==== South Papua ====
Papuan ethnic groups/tribes in the Indonesian province of South Papua include:

Merauke Regency	Bian Marind; Kanum; Kimaam; Maklew; Marind Dek (Hulu); Marind Laut (Muara); Mombum; Marori; Yab (Yelmek); Yei
Asmat Regency	Asmat; Citak; Pisa; Sawi; Tamnim (Citak); Warkai; Biplim
Mappi Regency	Airo-Sumaghaghe; Awyu; Kayagar; Muyu; Siagha; Tamagario; Yaghai; Yenimu
Boven Digoel Regency	Aghu; Iwur (Murop); Muyu (Are · Kakaib · Kamindip · Kasaut · Kawiyet · Ningrum · Okpari · Yonggom); Kauwol; Kombai; Korowai; Kotogut; Wambon (Mandobo); Wanggom; Yair

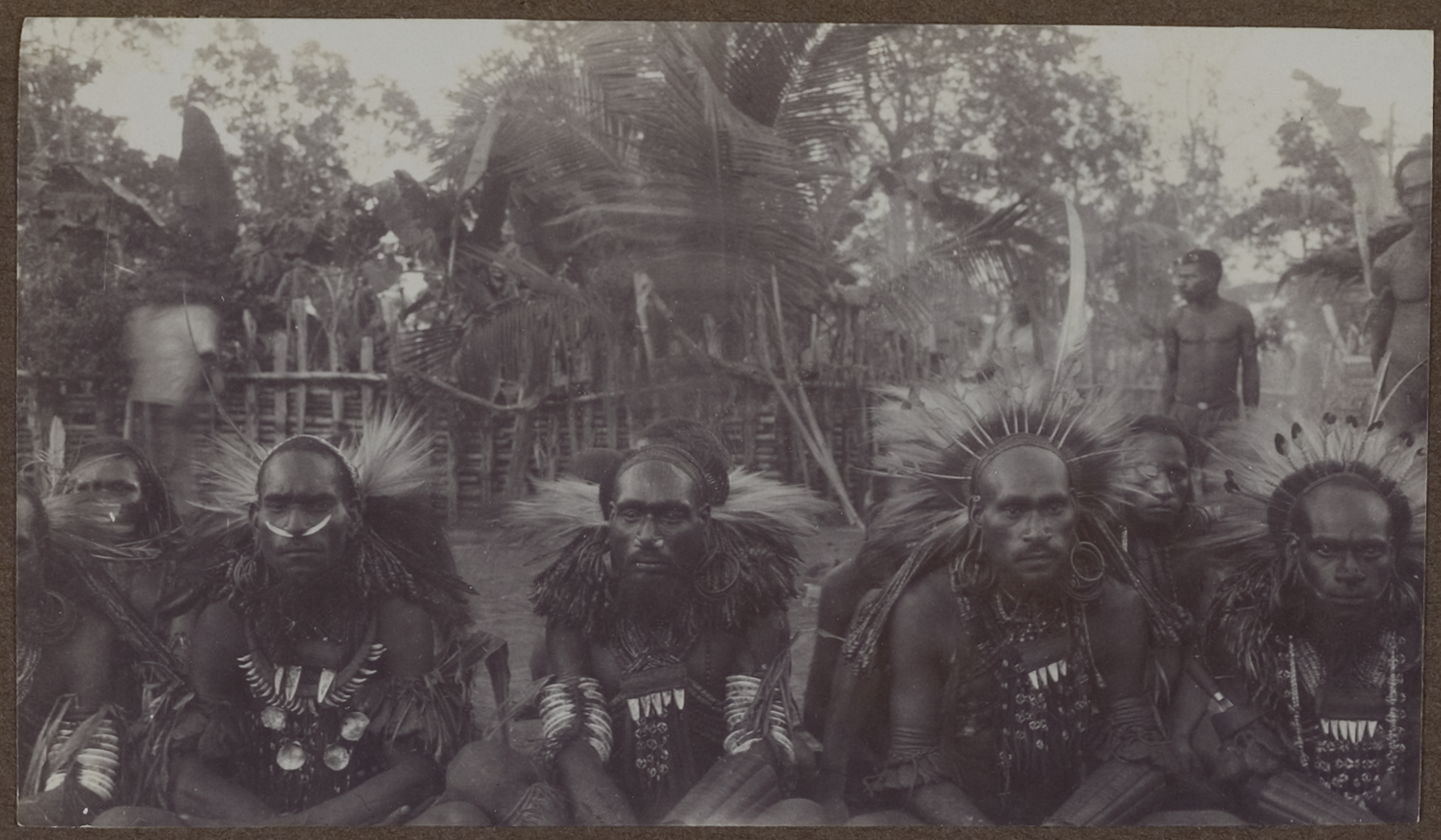
Marind men in Merauke, c. 1930

=== Papua New Guinea ===
- Abelam
- Angu
- Baruya
- Biangai
- Bilibil
- Chambri
- Duna
- Etoro
- Fore
- Gadsup
- Gogodala
- Haroli
- Hewa
- Huli
- Iatmul
- Kaluli
- Kwoma
- Koteka
- Maisin (AN with many non-AN elements)
- Melpa
- Mian
- Morkai
- Motu
- Min
- Mundugumor
- Ogea
- Orokaiva
- Sambia
- Swagap
- Tairora
- Tanga
- Telefol
- Tsembaga
- Urapmin
- Wiru
- Wola
- Wopkaimin
- Yaifo
- Zia

==== Bismarck Archipelago ====
- Baining
- Tolai
- Trobriand

== See also ==
- Aboriginal Australians
- Indigenous Australians
- Koteka Tribal Assembly
- List of ethnic groups of West Papua
- Malagasy people (Africa)
- Moluccans (to the west of New Guinea)
- Negrito (Southeast Asia)
- Papua conflict
- Proto-Australoid
- Stéphane Breton (filmmaker)
- Torres Strait Islanders between New Guinea and mainland Australia (including the Meriam people, whose language family is otherwise found in New Guinea)
