= Awyu people =

Ethnic group in Indonesia

Awyu
Auyu or Awya
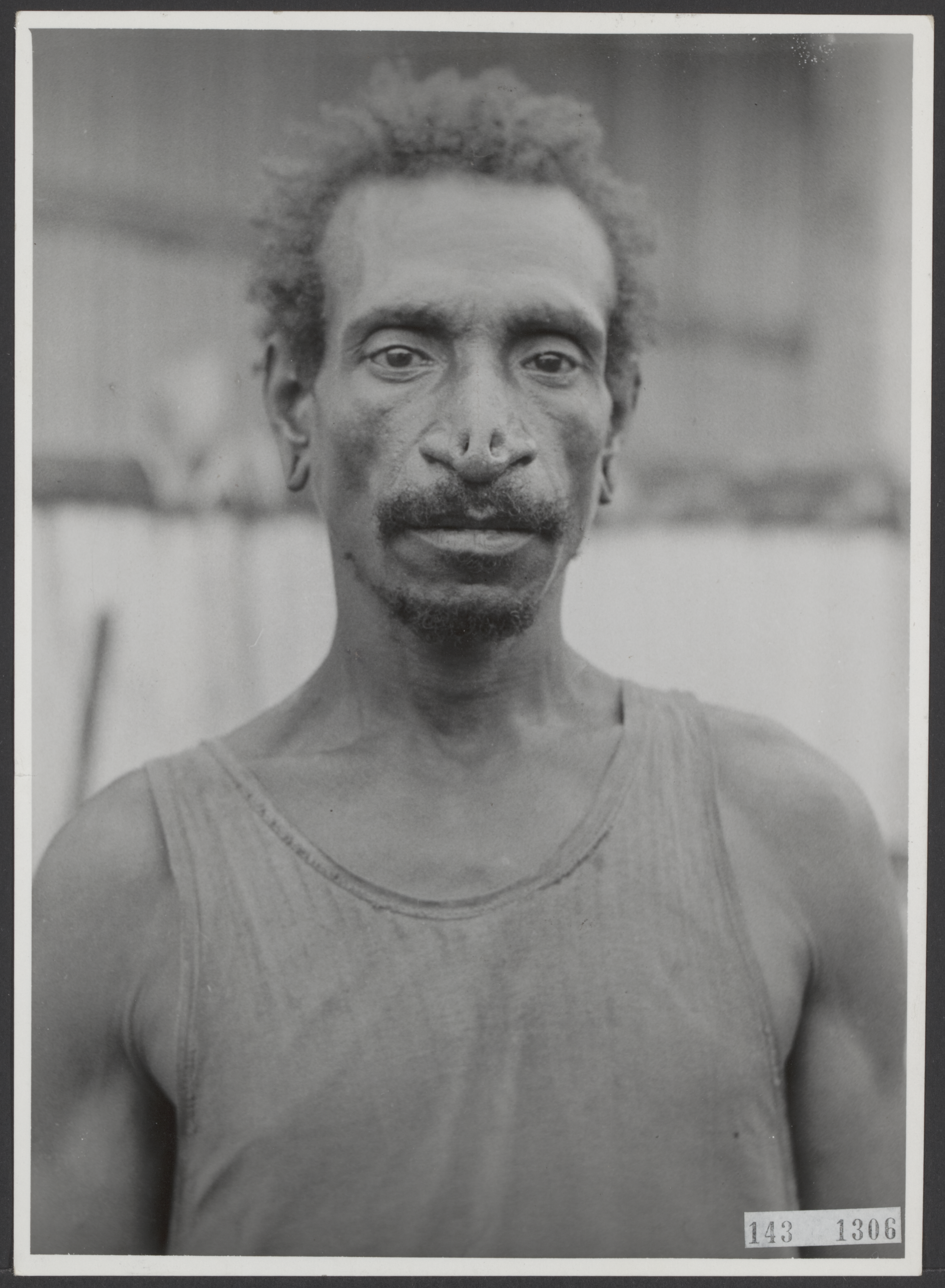
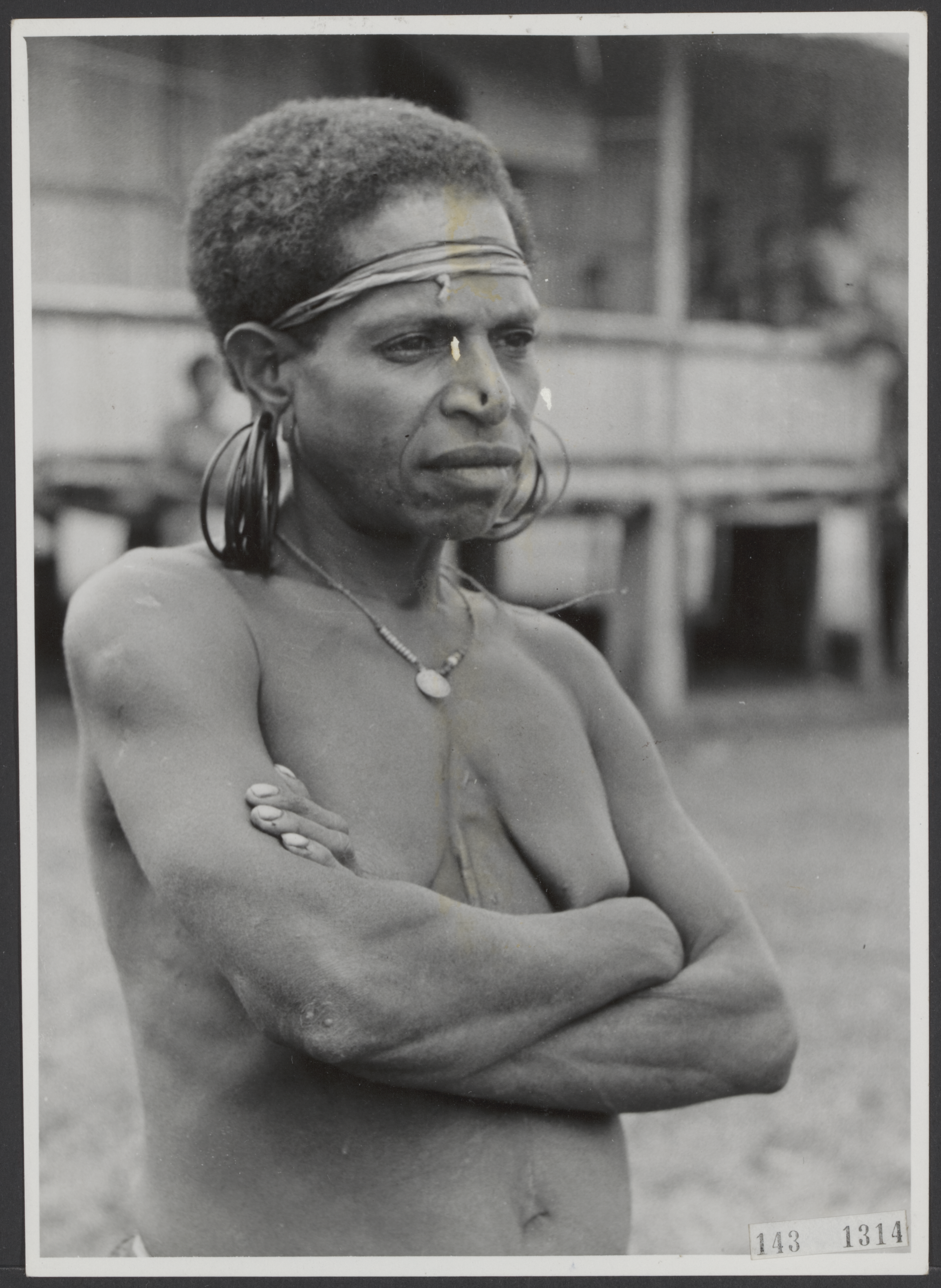
- Awyu man and woman, 1955

Total population
- 27,300

Regions with significant populations
- Indonesia (South Papua)

Languages
- Awyu

Religion
- Christianity (predominantly Catholicism)

Related ethnic groups
- Asmat • Citak • Korowai • Kombai

The Awyu people, also known as Auyu or Awya, are an ethnic group inhabiting the Digul River basin along the coast of South Papua, Indonesia. The area is also inhabited by the Yahrai (Yaghai), and to the west by the Muyu. Their population is approximately 27,300 people. The Awyu primarily live as gatherers and hunters. Their staple foods include sago, fish, and river shrimp.

According to Joshua Project, the Awyu are divided into several subgroups: Aghu, Nohon, Pisa, Asue, Jair, and South Awyu.

== Language ==
The Awyu speak Awyu languages, part of the Papuan language family, which includes 5–11 dialects, among them: Asue, Pisa, Pasue, Aghu, Jair (Edera River, Upper Kia, Lower Kia), Yenimu (Oser), and Shiaxa (Siagha).

Awyu Darat Kotiak is spoken by communities in Kampung Kotiak, Passue District, Mappi Regency. Northern Kampung Kotiak is Gayu, north is Taim, and south is RT 03 Nohon. Parts of Kotiak, including Kampung Kotup, speak Yaghai. Dialectometric studies show Awyu Darat Kotiak has 90.75% to 100% similarity compared with other Awyu dialects, such as Awyu Darat Yagatsu and Awyu Darat Kiki.

== Society ==
Awyu communities traditionally trace their ancestry to a cave and migrated eastward along rivers, settling in an area called Yehundakai. Elders teach children and grandchildren local customs. Some live along the Digul River, others along the Mappi River to the upper Gondu River. They rely on forests for hunting, gathering, and fishing. The Awyu maintain peaceful relations with neighboring groups, including the Jair, Muyu, and Mandobo. Traditional headhunting practices are no longer observed.

The Awyu respect nature as a source of life and pass down ecological knowledge orally. Rituals and signs guide hunting and gathering practices. Certain animals and trees are considered sacred, and respect for nature is expressed through prayers and offerings before entering the forest.

== Modern challenges ==
In recent years, Awyu communities face deforestation and land conflicts due to international market demands. Expansion of oil palm plantations threatens local forests. Customary forest rights are transmitted orally, making it difficult to assert legal protections and maintain traditional governance.

Some communities are affected by the planned expansion of company PT Indo Asiana Lestari's oil palm plantations, which have covered 39,190 hectares since 2017; previously, the land was managed by PT Energy Samudera Kencana. The concessions are in the Mandobo and Fofi Districts of Boven Digoel Regency, sparking both support and opposition among Awyu communities.

== Notable people ==
- Mathius Fakhiri, Indonesian politician
