= Kombai =

Kombai may be referring to:

- Kombai dog, a hound breed from the region of Kombai.
- Kombai people, an indigenous people in western New Guinea
- Kombai, Tamil Nadu
- Kombai language a Papuan language
