= Wambon people =

Ethnic group in Indonesia

Wambon
Mandup Wambon
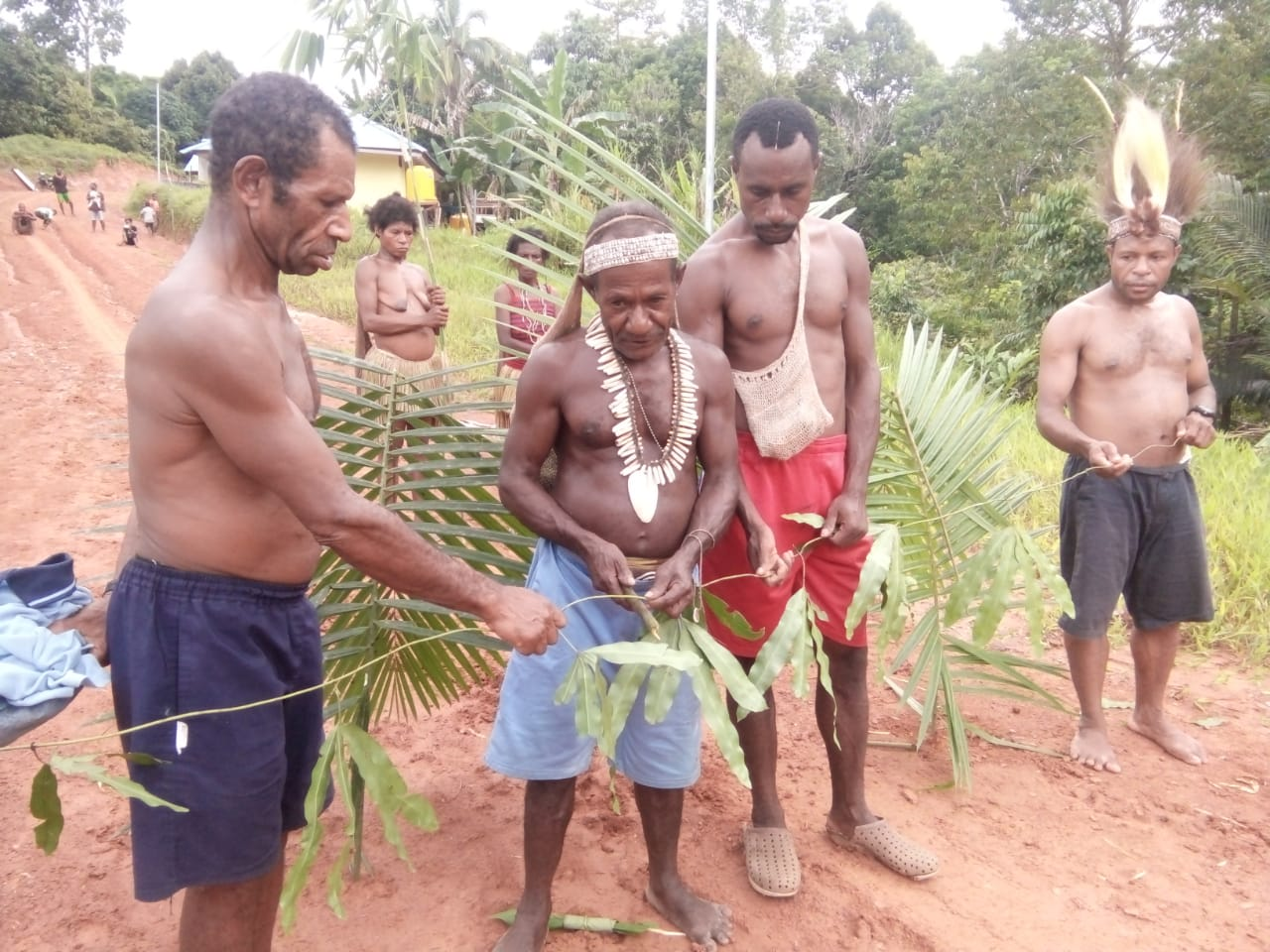
- The Wambon people in Boven Digoel, Indonesia.

Regions with significant populations
- Indonesia (South Papua)

Languages
- Wambon, Mandobo, and Indonesian

Religion
- Christianity (majority); Islam, folk religion (minority)

Related ethnic groups
- Kombai • Wanggom • Muyu

The Wambon people (Wambon: Mandup Wambon) are an ethnic group inhabiting the lowlands of southern Papua, Indonesia. The Wambon are the largest ethnic group in Boven Digoel Regency.

== Language ==
The Wambon people speak various languages and dialects, though they belong to the same ethnic group. Broadly, the Ndumut language family is divided into several branches: Ketum [ktt] and Wambon [wms], which are closely related, compared to Upper Mandobo [aax] and Lower Mandobo [bwp].

The Wambon language is divided into three groups:

- Ketum Wambon (Kitum)
  - Arimbit
  - Kuken
  - Bayanggop
  - Ater
- Northern Wambon (Wambon Kenondik, Wambon Digul)
- Southern Wambon (Wambon Kenyam, Wambon Yonggom; not Yonggom)

The Mandobo language group is traditionally divided into three groups before further subdividing into several dialects. This traditional classification differs from that of Jang (2003) as reported in Ethnologue.

- Upper Wambon (Mandobo Atas) [aax]
  - Kokenop/Kohonope
  - Agayop
- Coastal Wambon (Mandobo Tengah)
  - Ulugela or Lugerah (meaning "speech" or "language") / Iwammup / Kenerame (meaning "what")
- Lower Wambon (Mandobo Bawah) [bwp]
  - Tekamerop/Thegamonok

== Mythology ==
In the beliefs of inland southern Papua communities, a figure known as Tumolop exists. For the Wambon, Tumolop is their deity, and is said to have sent his child in an inexplicable form. This child, named Beten, became the progenitor of a large ethnic group from the wilderness, later spreading across Papua. According to Wambon legend, this creation occurred at Mount Koreyom (Wambon Kogonop: Koleyombin), a sacred site where traditional customs are still observed. Wambon theology and that of the Auyu people is similar to the process of the Torah to the Bible in Christian beliefs, beginning with the Word, and the Word being God who created.

== Notable people ==
- Benediktus Tambonop, regent of Boven Digoel Regency
- Kornelis Jowayup, Wambon tribal chief
