= Tunji Oyelana =

Nigerian musician and actor (born 1939)

- Born: 4 July 1939 (age 86)
- Occupations: Singer, actor, lecturer

Tunji Oyelana (born 4 October 1939) is a Nigerian musician, actor, folk singer, composer and once a lecturer at the University of Ibadan, Nigeria. Tunji Oyelana is of the Yoruba ethnic group and is a native of Nigeria. Most of Tunji Oyelana's songs are in Yoruba. In the early 1980s, he teamed up with Nigeria's first and only winner of the Nobel Prize for Literature, Wole Soyinka, to record a musical album that satirized the corruption of the Nigerian political elite. He was the musician for Stéphane Breton's 1994 film Un dieu au bord de la route. Oyelana is credited with having sold the most albums by a Nigerian High Life musicians. In 2012 he released A Nigerian Retrospective 1966-79, an album from Soundway Records. Apart from Fela Kuti and King Sunny Ade, Oyelana is regarded as one of the most played Yoruba musicians. He and Soyinka composed I Love My Country and, in 1996, were both charged with treason and forced into exile by Sani Abacha while touring internationally with Soyinka's play The Beatification of Area Boy. Oyelana, the leader of The Benders currently lives in the United Kingdom.

== Music and film career ==
Orisun Masks

In the 1960s, Tunji Oyelana was one of the original members of Wole Soyinka's 1960 Orisun Masks. He calls Soyinka "Ọ̀gá", meaning "boss" in Yoruba. He was one of the original Soyinka actors travelling all over the world to interpret roles in such plays as Kongi's Harvest, The Road, Madmen and Specialists and Opera Wonyosi, to the delight of audiences.

The Benders

He later burst out on his own as an ethnomusicologist, producing folk music which ruled the airwaves in the 70s and 80s with a group famously known as Tunji Oyelana and The Benders. Many of his albums would qualify as classics in their genre, deploying native wisdom, folklore and wit, mixed with sparse syncopation and antiphony, relying heavily on the human voice and its inflections to lift the spirit. Radio stations loved to play his music and listeners derived much pleasure from them.

Sura the Tailor

In the 1980s, Oyelana also acted on television (NTA Ibadan particularly), perhaps the most famous of his engagements in this regard is a sitcom titled Sura de Tailor in which he played the lead role. Many would recall the theme song of that programme which soon caught on with viewers: "Sura de tailor, oko Adunni, the friend of Major, expert in Toro, danshiki, and buba, also English coat and trouser o.... Sura de Tailor is your frie-n-d."

University of Ibadan

In the 1980s at the University of Ibadan, he was an artist in residence in music at the Department of Theatre Arts. As a professional artist, he helped to provide practical instruction in music. He was the music director for many of the departmental productions, scoring lyrics to beat and putting young students through; he was also a great collaborator in the production process.

== Selected discography ==
Year	Album	Song title	Notes
1976	Double Face	Ifa	topped playing charts in Nigeria.
1976	Double Face	I wo ko lo dami	has been used as a soundtrack in various Nigerian movie.
1976	Double Face	Okete	---
1976	Double Face	Alakowe	topped playing charts in Nigeria.
1976	Double Face	Enia bi aparo	topped playing charts in Nigeria.
1976	Double Face	Pambola Mbola	congas by Tunde Daudu saxophone by Eji Oyewole
1976	–	Mo lo so ko	his most played song, guest appeared in Thunderbolt (Magun) a film written by Adebayo Faleti, directed by Tunde Kelani.
2012	A Nigerian Retrospective 1966–79	Which Way Africa?	an album with a throwback of his songs.
2012	A Nigerian Retrospective 1966–79	Alaru T'onje Buredi	originally composed in the 70's.
2012	A Nigerian Retrospective 1966–79	Which Way Africa?	–
2012	A Nigerian Retrospective 1966–79	Ipasan	–

== Selected filmography ==
Year	Title	Role	Notes
1977	All You Need Is Love	Tunji Oyelana (Himself)	a music documentary
1994	Un dieu au bord de la route	Musician	with Stéphane Breton as director and Wole Soyinka as narrator
