= Stéphane Breton =

Stéphane Breton may refer to:

- Stéphane Breton (actor), Canadian actor
- Stéphane Breton (filmmaker) (born 1959), French filmmaker, photographer and anthropologist
