= 1984 West Papuan refugee crisis =

Throughout 1984, over 10,000 Papuans from Indonesian Papua fled as refugees across the border into neighboring Papua New Guinea (PNG). The exodus had been caused by a crackdown by Indonesian authorities following a failed uprising in February 1984 by the Free Papua Movement in Jayapura, although many of the refugees originated south of the initial uprising.

The refugees initially suffered from a lack of aid from the Papua New Guinean government. Within several years, some refugees had been relocated to UNHCR camps, and some repatriated to Indonesian Papua, but a large number remained in unofficial border camps near the border. Since the fall of Suharto, more had repatriated and the PNG government had engaged in a naturalization program for the refugees, but almost 10,000 refugees remained in PNG.

== Background ==
The former Dutch colony of West Papua was annexed by Indonesia in 1963, and international recognition was given in 1969 following the Act of Free Choice, a controversial referendum with an electorate of less than 1% of the local population. The Free Papua Movement (Indonesian: Organisasi Papua Merdeka/OPM) was established in response, aimed at achieving independence from Indonesia. The movement began fighting in an armed struggle, primarily against the Indonesian Army, in 1965 following the Arfai incident. Around Jayapura, the region's capital, an Indonesian military operation in 1976 severely weakened OPM's military capabilities, limiting the movement to small-scale guerilla action and fracturing its leadership. Throughout the 1970s, as the Indonesian government's control of the region strengthened, security agencies such as Kopkamtib began to play a more active role in the region, engaging in intimidation, killings, and disappearances of local leaders whose loyalties were questioned. OPM increased its activities with small-scale attacks in the early 1980s.

== Events ==
A large number of Javanese transmigrant settlers to Papua were announced in late 1983, who would begin arriving in April 1984. Some prominent West Papuan cultural figures and activists were also arrested, such as Arnold Ap. On 13 February 1984, Elias Warsey, a corporal in the Papuan military command (Kodam Cenderawasih) with sympathies for Papuan independence attempted to fly the Morning Star flag in Jayapura, in front of the provincial parliament building. He was spotted by a group of policemen, who shot him dead. An unrelated Papuan janitor was also shot dead, mistaken as an OPM member. Around 100 soldiers of Papuan origin deserted in the aftermath of the incident, seizing weapons and ammunition in the process.

The deserters began launching attacks on Indonesian military positions in the vicinity of Jayapura, and the Indonesian Army launched a counterinsurgency campaign involving house-to-house searches for the captured weapons. 70 of the some 100 deserting soldiers eventually surrendered. Due to the shootouts between OPM and the Indonesian Army, several thousand refugees – around 8,000 by May 1984 – crossed the border into Papua New Guinea (PNG). As fighting and army crackdowns spread from Jayapura, more refugees crossed the border from present-day South Papua. OPM guerillas had also encouraged villagers to leave, citing the inability of the Indonesian Army to differentiate between civilians and the guerillas. Another 2,000 refugees crossed the border between May and August. Most of the refugees formed camps close to the border, on the PNG side.

Initial refugees were from tribes and peoples living in the vicinity of Jayapura, Biak, and Serui. Later refugees were primarily the Muyu people, with an estimated 9,500 Muyu crossing the border. The total number of refugees have been cited between 10,000 and 13,000 (including other, smaller waves of refugees).

== Aftermath ==
While there was widespread sympathy among Papua New Guineans for the refugees, who were seen as fellow Melanesians escaping oppression, PNG's government under Michael Somare intended to avoid a dispute with the Indonesian government, and thus limited aid to the refugees. By September 1984, 92 refugees had died of starvation in a single camp, triggering public outcry which caused PNG's government to allow more aid and international observers to the refugee camps.

PNG acceded to the Convention Relating to the Status of Refugees in 1986 and a refugee settlement was established in Western Province, named East Awin. In the late 1990s, the settlement consisted of 17 camps and was populated by 3,500 refugees. The refugees remain as of 2024, with concentrations primarily in Sandaun and Western provinces along with in Port Moresby. A large number of refugees had refused to relocate to the UNHCR camps, citing the desire to engage in West Papuan independence activism hence forfeiting official refugee status and basic services. According to the Jesuit Refugee Service, there were still over 9,000 refugees in Western Province in 2024, with many being second-generation. The PNG government had since 2015 engaged in a registration and voluntary naturalization program for the refugees.

=== Repatriation ===
Some refugees were repatriated in 1984 and 1985 voluntarily, and the PNG government deported 12 refugees in October 1985 under charges of firearms offenses. The October deportations caused an uproar and political fracture in the PNG government, and the Somare government was ousted in a non-confidence vote the following month. Some of the refugees have returned to Indonesia after the fall of Suharto, in some cases with the encouragement of the Indonesian government.
