= Fofi =

District in South Papua, Indonesia

- District
- Location of the district in South Papua Location of the district in Western New Guinea
- Coordinates: 6°8′19.5227″S 139°56′43.5282″E
- Country: Indonesia
- Province: South Papua
- Regency: Boven Digoel
- District seat: Makmur

Area
  - Total: 2,466.70 km^{2} (952.40 sq mi)

Population (2020)
  - Total: 2,690
  - Density: 1.09/km^{2} (2.82/sq mi)
- Time zone: UTC+09:00 (EIT)
- Postal code: 99673
- Regional code: 93.02.10
- Villages: 8

Fofi is a district in Boven Digoel Regency, South Papua, Indonesia. The formation of Fofi District is regulated in Boven Digoel Regency Regional Regulation Number 25 of 2005, which stipulates the formation of nine new districts in the region. This regulation came into effect on November 30, 2005. The district covers an area of 2,466.70 km2, and had a population of 2,690 at the 2020 Census.

== Geography ==
Administratively, Fofi District consists of eight villages (kampung), namely:

- Sadar
- Bangun
- Makmur
- Sohokanggo
- Domo
- Hamkhu
- Hello
- Navini
