= Kombai language =

Language in Indonesia

Kombai
- Khobaye-lu
- Region: Boven Digoel Regency, South Papua
- Ethnicity: Kombai & Wanggom
- Native speakers: (5,000 cited 1991–2002)
- Language family: Trans–New Guinea: Greater Awyu; Awyu–Dumut; Kombai

Language codes
- ISO 639-3: Either: tyn – Kombai wng – Wanggom
- Glottolog: ndei1235 Ndeiram komb1274 Kombai

Kombai (Komboy) is a Papuan language of Boven Digoel Regency in South Papua, Indonesia. It is spoken by the Kombai, including the Kombai Kali or River Kombai, who spoke Tayan dialect.

Ethnologue records a Wanggom language which is similar to Kombai, spoken by the Wanggom people. However, their language has not been attested as a distinct language.
