= Wanggom people =

Papuan ethnic group

Wanggom

Regions with significant populations
- Indonesia (South Papua)

Languages
- Wanggom, Indonesian

Related ethnic groups
- Kombai, Korowai, Wambon

The Wanggom are a minor tribe who live in Boven Digoel, specifically in Firiwage, Kawagit, and the surrounding districts. Its tribal area is bordered by the Korowai and Tsakwambo in the north, Wambon and Mandobo in the east, and Kombai in the west and south. The Wanggom itself is considered a sub-tribe of the Kombai, speaking a dialect of their language called Wanggom, though it is sometimes classified as a different language.

== Etymology ==
The name wanggom means 'my child', this relates to the origin of the tribe which considered itself to be the youngest and smallest to be created from mud and soil after the Kolufo (Korowai) and Wambon.

== Traditional houses ==
The traditional houses of the Wanggom are separated into two categories; both are types of stilt houses. The first, called Anggulu, is built on top of a large tree after it was pruned to form the central pillar, forming a tree house. The second is called Juro, which is built at a height more similar to a typical stilt house.

The beams and columns are made of agathis (ndalu), sundacarpus (ura), and bamboos (holu). They are lashed together using rattan (wangri) and tali mangkok or tali merah ('red rope') made from a certain plant, named such because after drying the rope's colour will turn red.
