= Muyu people =

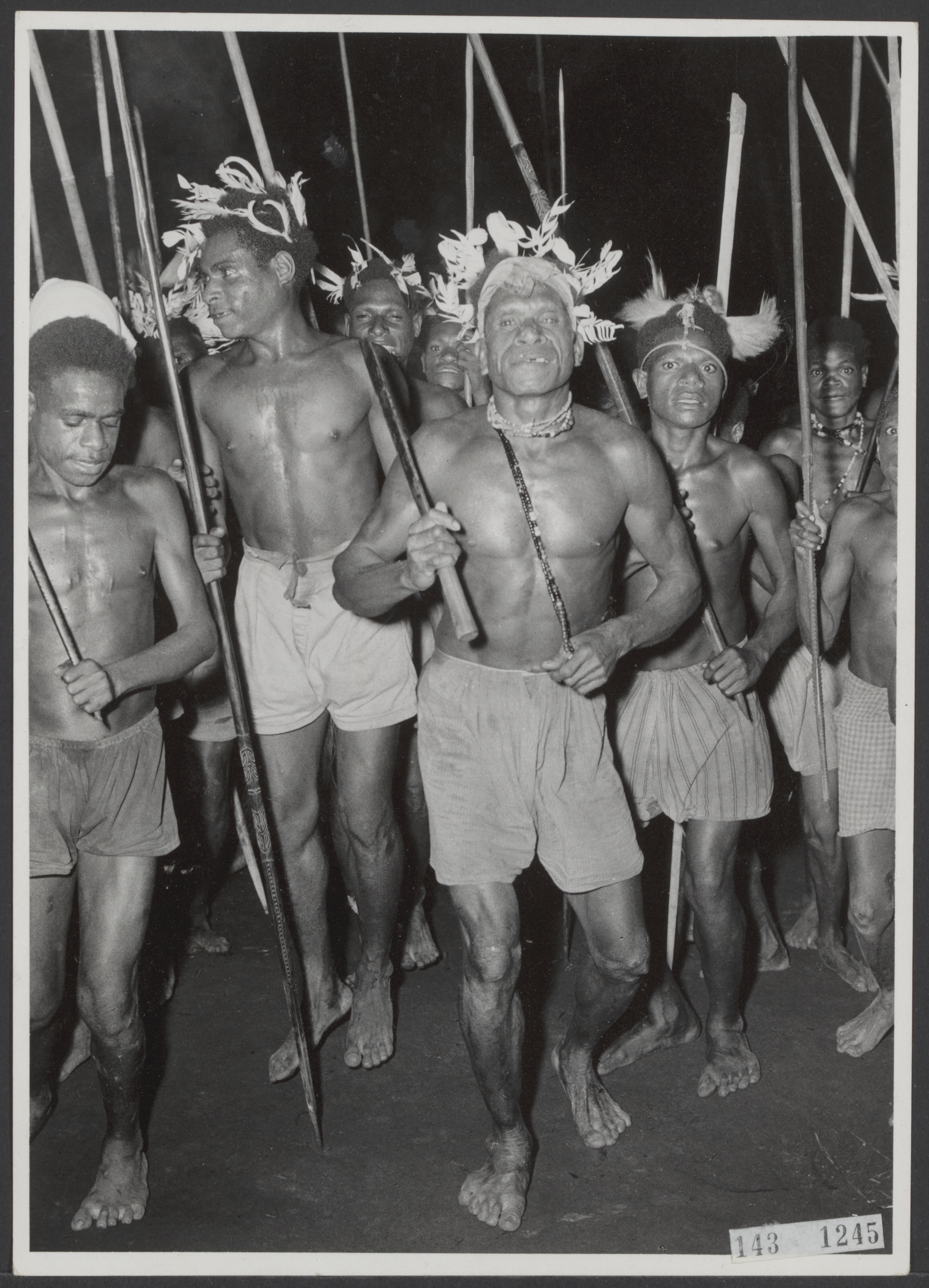
- Muyu people men's dance in Katan, 1955

Total population
- 17.269

Regions with significant populations
- Indonesia (Boven Digoel, South Papua); Papua New Guinea (Western Province)

Languages
- Muyu (North Muyu and South Muyu), Ninggerum

Related ethnic groups
- Ningrum • Yonggom • Wambon

The Muyu people is one of the ethnic groups originating around the Muyu River, which lies in the northeast of Merauke, South Papua, Indonesia. They speak Muyu.

== Etymology ==
The term "Muyu" emerged from two possibilities: first, it appeared along with the arrival of the Catholic missions and Father Petrus Hoeboer, a Dutch national, in 1933. The term "Muyu" originated from the local residents referring to the western and eastern parts of the river as "ok Mui," meaning "Mui River," which they regularly conveyed to the Dutch. This term eventually evolved into Muyu.

Secondly, the term originated from the first contact between the Muyu and Dutch explorers in 1909. They were traveling upstream of Digul River to Kao River, when they met with a group of people from a sub-tribe of the Muyu, the Kamindip tribe, specifically the Muyan clan. The Muyan introduced themselves as "neto muyannano" ('we are Muyan people'). The name Muyan is the one that was later recorded as Muyu for the name for the whole tribe.

== Distribution ==
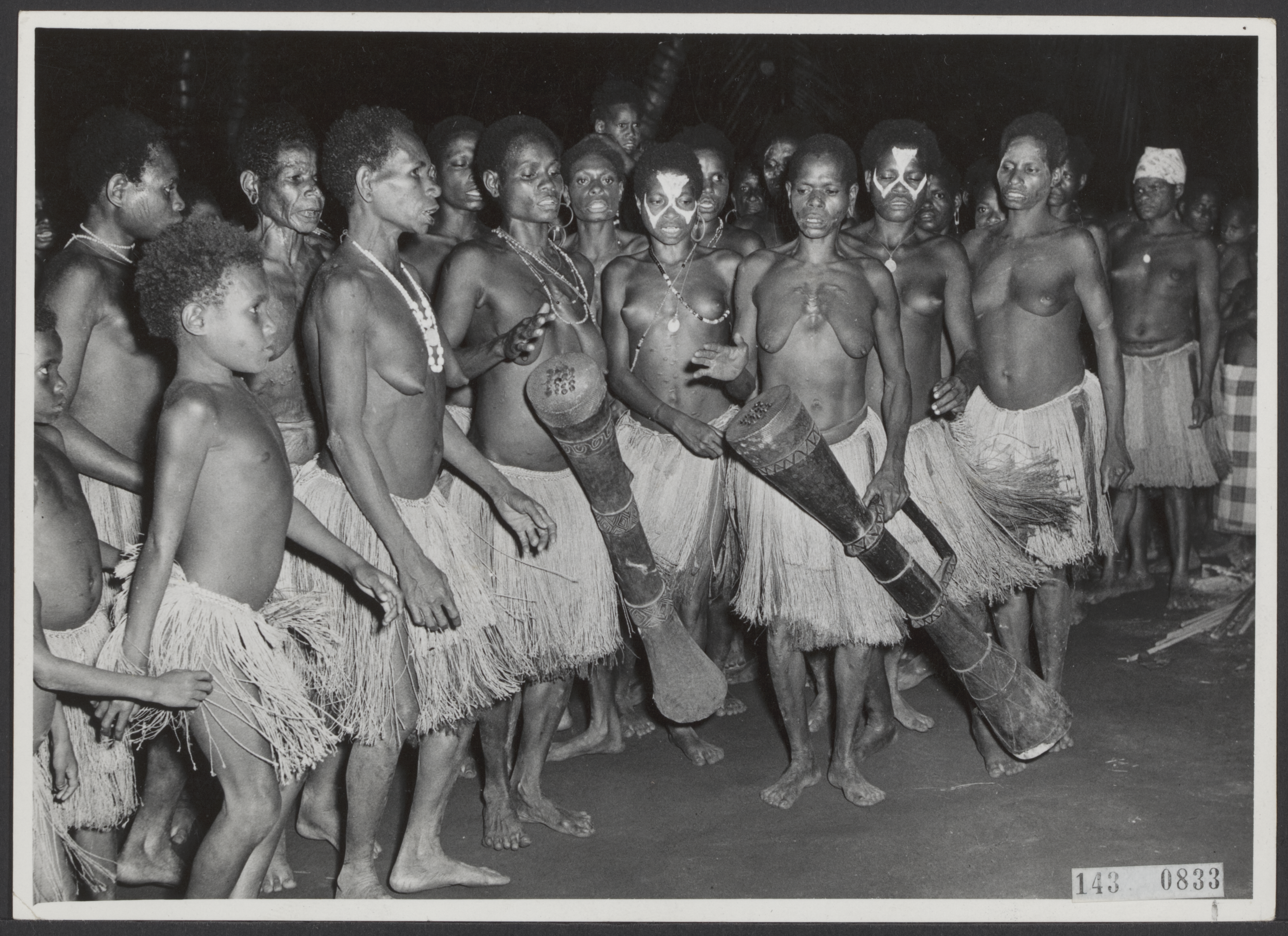
Muyu people women's dance in Katan, 1955

Muyu people can be found in the interior region of Papua Island, which borders Papua New Guinea. To the east, it is bordered by Papua New Guinea. To the south, it is bordered by the Kao River, the Digul River, and Merauke Regency. To the north, it is bordered by the Star Mountains, and to the west, it is bordered by Boven Digoel Regency.

The Muyu area stretches 180 km in length, covers an area of 7,860 km^{2}, and has a width of 40–45 km. Data from 1956 mentions that the Muyu had a population of 17,269 people living in 59 villages. The Muyu speak Muyu languages, which traditionally are divided into multiple dialects according to Muyu sub-tribes. Linguists initially classified them as either North Muyu (Ninati) and South Muyu (Metomka), along with Yonggom and Ningrum languages. However, this classification is outdated as Metomka village no longer exists, and the dialect spoken in Ninati village is called Yonggom in local classification. Traditionally Muyu uses ot (shells) and mindit (dog teeth) as a transaction currency.

The Muyu region is generally hilly, with elevations ranging from 100 to 700 meters above sea level. The soil is relatively infertile, with a slightly reddish-brown color, which often leads to food shortages among the Muyu people, resulting in a high mortality rate in the area. The main livelihoods of the Muyu people are hunting, raising pigs and dogs, fishing, and producing sago.

A large number of Muyu reside in neighboring Western Province of Papua New Guinea as refugees, primarily displaced during the 1984 West Papuan refugee crisis.

== Sub-ethnic group ==
The Muyu itself is divided into several sub-ethnic groups, each with its own territory and dialect.

- The Kamindip sub-ethnic group, located in Amburan, Anggamburan, Kanggup, Sesnuk, Umap, and Yomkondo.
- The Okpari sub-ethnic group, located in Amuan, Imko, Kakuna, Mindiptana, and Wanggatkibi.
- The Kakaib sub-ethnic group, located in the eastern part of Mindiptana District. They inhabit Kombut, Mokbiran, Namas, and part of Kawangtet.
- The Are sub-ethnic group, located in the northern part, directly borders the Ngalum people and the Waropko District. They inhabit Benkim, Deto, Tembutka, and Wametkapa.
- The Kasaut sub-ethnic group, in the northern part, settles in Ikcan, Upkim, and Waropko.
- The Jonggom sub-ethnic group, inhabiting the northeastern area in the Inggembit, Kawaktembut, Kunkim, Ninati, Timka, and Yetetkun.
- The Ninggrum sub-ethnic group numbered around 1,000 people in Indonesia in 1975. The Ninggrum dialect is divided into three subdialects: Ningrum, Kasuwa, and Daupka/Tedi Atas. They inhabit the northeastern area from Ninggrum and Yetetkun to the territory of Papua New Guinea.
- The Kawibtet/Kawiyet sub-ethnic group, from the phrase kaduk wip (“people from the center”). The Kawiyet dialect itself is divided into three subdialects: Komoyan, Medewan, and Metawan. They inhabit Kanggewot, part of Kawangtet, Upyetetko, and Wanggatkibi.

== Family system ==
Within the Muyu tribe, there is a chief or high leader who holds authority in social and religious life. Additionally, the tribe has influential and respected figures, known as keyepak and Tomkot (big man). The distinction between the two lies in the amount of tukon (valuable items) such as ot they possess and their knowledge of mystical powers. While Tomkot has inadequate knowledge of mystical powers and does not own many valuable items, he lives a simple life and holds influence within his lineage. On the other hand, Kayapak is someone who possesses many valuable items and has mastery over mystical powers.

These figures hold authority within the patrilineal kinship groups (lineages) of nuclear families. Most of their homes are treehouses or stilt houses. These houses are divided into several rooms, including rooms for adult women, men, and children. Members of a nuclear family may live together in the same house or build homes close to each other to protect themselves from enemy attacks. In the Muyu society, polygamy is permitted, so it is not uncommon for a man to have more than one wife.

The nuclear family plays a role in managing the methods of controlling assets and land, ways of obtaining food, organizing settlement patterns, and having authority over territories larger than the lineage, as well as passing on supernatural knowledge. The nuclear family forms patrilineal kinship groups, which can further develop into broader kinship networks.

== Traditional costume ==
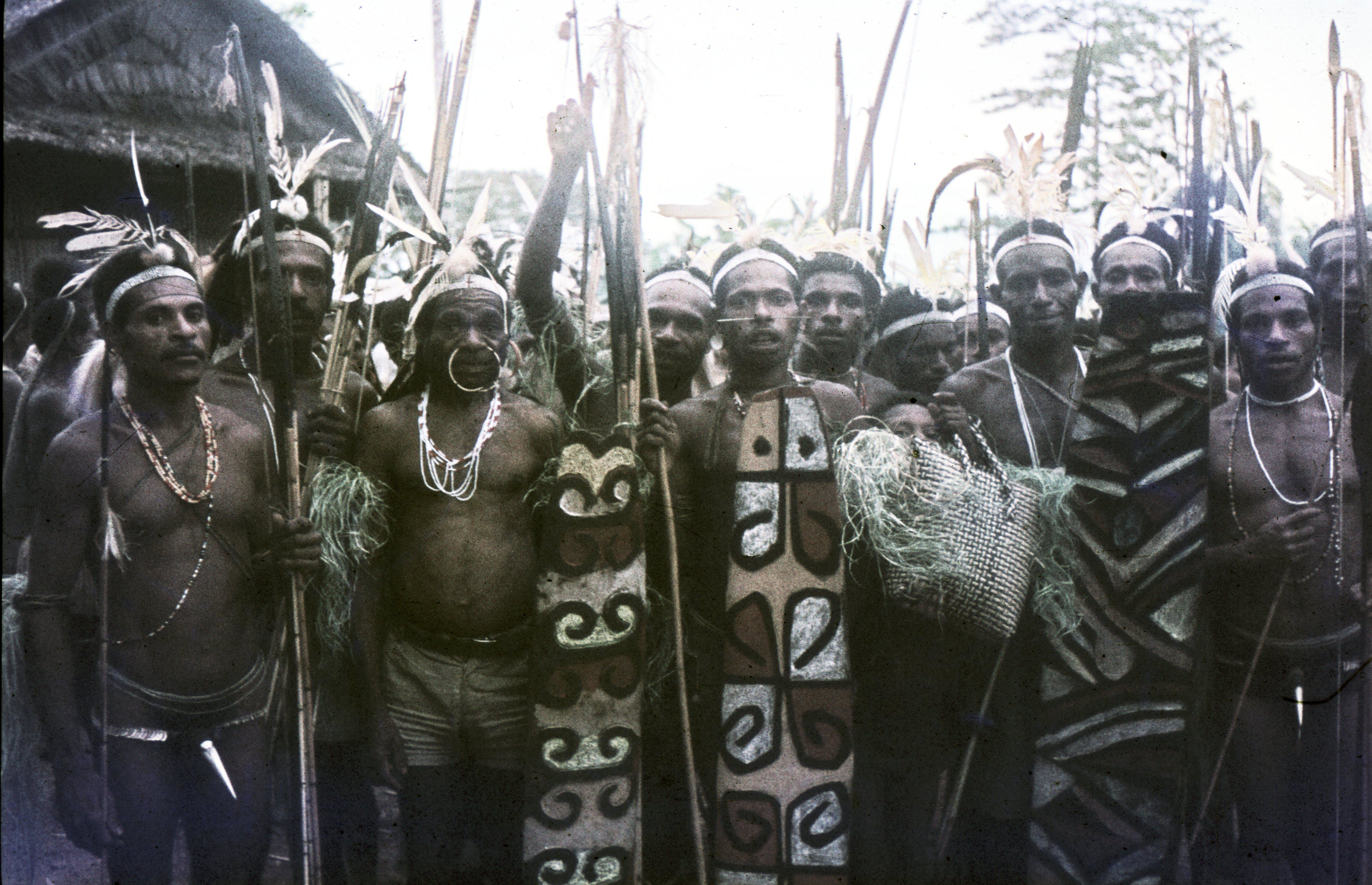
A Muyu (Yonggom) man from Ninati in traditional costume

Muyu men wear a koteka called kawet karuk, which is made from the beak of the blyth's hornbill (on kewet). After being separated from the bird’s head, the beak is dried over a fireplace before holes are made to insert a cord tied around the waist. Usually, it is worn during feasts or dances such as amewop, urumanop, and ketmom by young men. In addition, there is also a koteka made from a gourd (wabot), which is long and slightly curved, measuring around 35 cm. Its tip is decorated with yellow and white fur from the common spotted cuscus (bandep).

For daily life, Muyu men use a genital covering other than the koteka, which only covers the tip of the penis (similar to the nega used by the Lepki and other tribes in the Star Mountains region). There are two types of genital covering. The first is orom yop and it is made from a wild mango seed, oval-shaped and slightly flattened. The second type is mamundin yop and it comes from a kind of forest palm (possibly pandanus), which is round in shape. These penile caps are small, with a diameter of around 2.5–3.5 cm.

Meanwhile, Muyu women wear a fringed skirt made from bulrush, a long grass or water reed (ampet) from the swamps called wonom. On their bodies, they wear a rattan corset called yirim nong.

== Traditional house ==
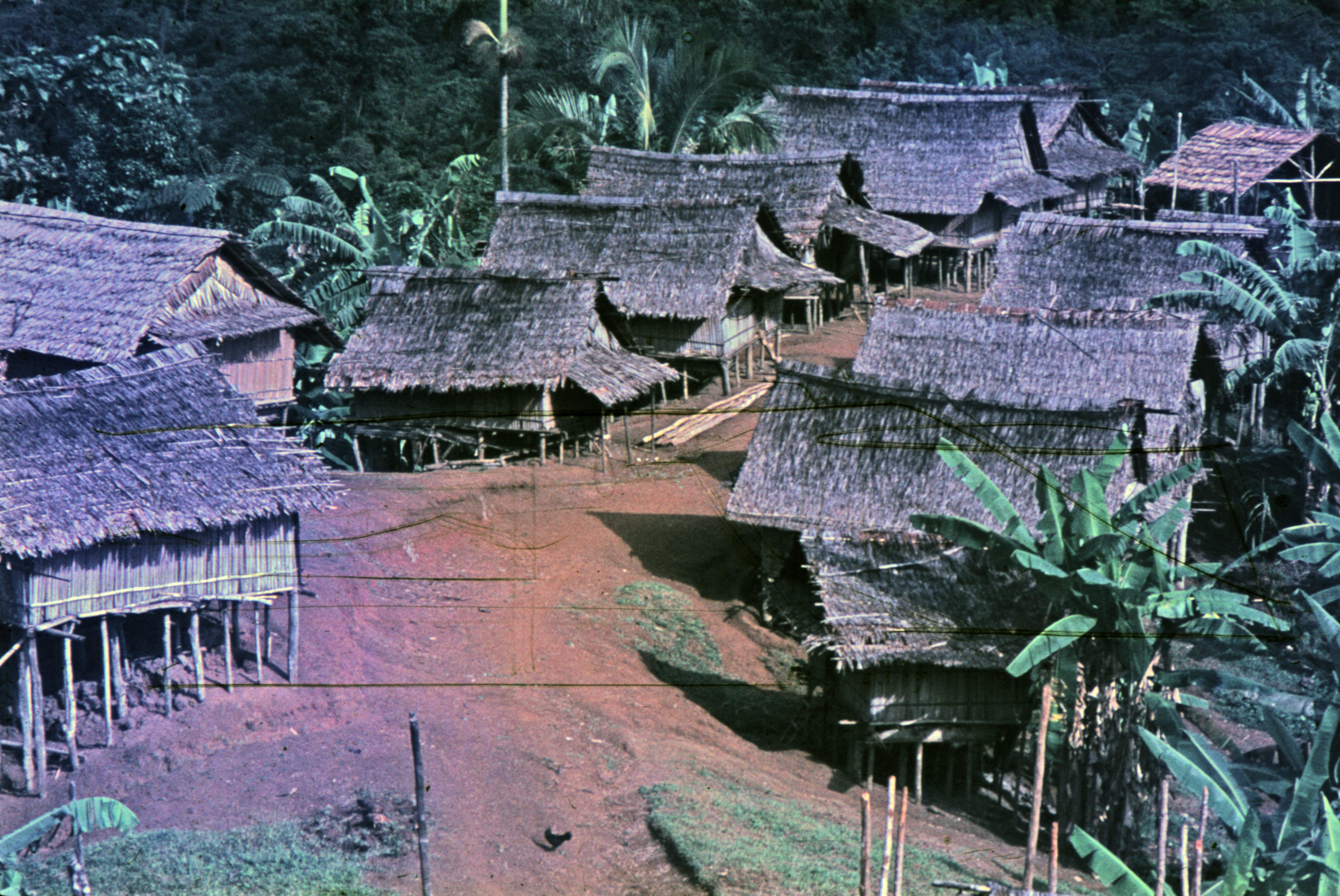
The Ambip houses in Waropko

Ambip is the traditional house of the Muyu people. It is a stilt house supported by several columns made of tree trunks and a central tree trunk post, forming a treehouse-like structure. Today, it is generally built at a height of 3–8 meters, although in the past it could reach up to 20 meters above the ground, with a floor area of 4–8 square meters. There is also an even taller house called Ayomru, which can reach heights of more than 30 meters. This treehouse serves as a watchtower or lookout house.

The houses are built from the leaves and trunks of the nibong palm. The women’s and men’s rooms are separated by partitions made of nibong leaves, and usually the women’s chamber is smaller than the men’s chamber. Inside, there are several amkotep (hearths), typically two for women and men. Women, except for small children, are forbidden from approaching the men’s hearth; therefore, when a child reaches adolescence, they are given their own hearth.
