= Zia people (Papua New Guinea) =

Ethnic group

The Zia are a people of about 4,000 people living in the lower Waria Valley in Morobe Province, Papua New Guinea.

The Zia are divided into four clans, Bego (hornbill), Sakia (white cockatoo), Wapo (eagle) and Yewa (bird of paradise), with each animal as the clan's symbol. Each clan also carries specific responsibilities to the nation at large, in part through the maintenance of specialized field of knowledge. The clans are matrilineal, with children inheriting their mother's clan membership and disallowing marriage between two members of the same clan.

National decisions are made by chiefs representing the four clans and as such, require a majority of represented support to proceed. 2 The Zia tribal area covers the lower reaches of the Waria river, and extends along the Solomon Sea north and south of the river mouth. Communities include Zare, Ainse, Siu, Popoe, Dona, Saigara, Pema, Siu, Bau and Eu.

Only the communities of Eu, Pema and Zare have schools with instruction above the third year. There is also a school (with dorms) at Toyare, at the mouth of Waria river. Because of the distance involved, parents who wish to send their children to higher grades must send their children to live in other communities for extended periods of time. The cost is quite expensive—for many families, prohibitively so. Upper level students in the Waria valley have two high school options. The first is a technical high school located near Toyare. The nearest traditional high school is four hours away north along the coast by boat.

The region's current Minister in Parliament is Sasa Zibe, who is from the area.
