= Stéphane Breton (filmmaker) =

French filmmaker, photographer and anthropologist

- Born: 1959; Paris, France
- Occupations: Filmmaker, photographer, anthropologist
- Website: stephane-breton-films.weebly.com

Stéphane Breton (born 1959) is a French filmmaker, photographer and anthropologist.

He shoots his films alone, taking care of the cinematography, the sound, and everything else himself. This allows him to get close to things and people and, most of all, to give a presence to his own gaze in his film.

Breton's non-fiction films are produced by Serge Lalou, Les Films d'Ici.

== Biography ==
Breton lived several years in the New Guinea Highlands, in the Indonesian province of Papua, where he did an anthropological fieldwork for many years.

There, he filmed Them and Me (Eux et moi, 63 min, 2001). Shot behind the scenes, from the point of view of a subjective camera, the film shows his ambiguous relations and negotiations with the people of this small village lost in the mountains.

His second film in New Guinea, Heaven in a Garden (Le ciel dans un jardin, 62 min, 2003), follows the last journey, reflective and nostalgic, of the ethnographer. One's gaze is attracted to the poetry of small things. It is a film about the stream of time and remembrance.

He directed A Silent Summer (Un été silencieux, 52 min, 2005), a film that takes place on the summer pastures of Kyrgyzstan, in the Tian Shan Mountains, not far from China. Through the attention it pays to ordinary moments, the film describes the solitude and arguments of shepherds living in the same tent, as well as that of the filmmaker, present but unnoticed, remote from their gazes.

He shot The Outside World (Le monde extérieur, 54 min, 2007) in the streets of Paris. This cinematic essay is a dreamlike straddling of worlds as well as a poetical and nonsensical, lilliputian ethnography. In a way, it is Them and Me in reverse: the filmmaker now turns his camera on the people who live in his "village", whom he observes through the candid eye of a fictitious, foreign friend, who is unaware of crowds and cities, and to whom he talks about the most insignificant things.

With Night Rising on Clouds (Nuages apportant la nuit, 30 min, 2007), he develops an experimental narrative using still, black-and-white pictures. It is the mysterious and eerie tale of a journey through an unknown, dark forest, with a musical score composed by Karol Beffa.

He directed The Empty House (La maison vide, 52 min, 2008). Shot like a western without a gun, at a drunkard's distance, the film takes place in New Mexico among an ancient Spanish community eaten to rack and ruin by rust, beer, and dust storms.

He shot Ascent to the Sky (La montée au ciel, 52 min, 2009): in a small valley in Nepal, at the end of a path worn out by so many feet and so many centuries, two old shepherds escape from their village to climb the mountains: shit everywhere, purity of heart, bedazzlement.

He shot in a train, in the middle of Russia, A Few Days Together (Quelques jours ensemble, 90 min, 2013): sixty thousand kilometres in the overheated third-class wagon of a train crossing the winter at the speed of a galloping donkey, in the company of an ex-serviceman of the Red Army with whom the filmmaker has been travelling for some time. The most unexpected characters get on and off, eat a bit, chat, lose themselves in their thoughts, snort, and most of all tell the story of their broken lives.

He is editing The Departed (20 min, 2013), a video installation about people sleeping in a Russian train.

He is currently preparing the shooting of Before Me, Dark Forests (Devant moi, les forêts sombres, 52 min, 2013), a film about a small Tatarian people in the Altay Mountains, in Russia.

An anthropologist specialized in Melanesia, Breton is a member of the Laboratoire d'anthropologie sociale at the Collège de France. He is associate professor at the École des Hautes Études en Sciences Sociales, where he teaches anthropology, semiotics and film.

== Filmography ==
- 1994: A God on the Side of the Road (Un dieu au bord de la route) – documentary film broadcast by Arte (52 min – shot in Nigeria).
- 2001: Them and Me (Eux et moi) – documentary film broadcast by Arte (63 min – shot in New Guinea).
- 2003: Heaven in a Garden (Le ciel dans un jardin) – documentary film broadcast by Arte (62 min – shot in New Guinea).
- 2005: A Silent Summer (Un été silencieux) – documentary film broadcast by Arte (52 min – shot in Kyrgyzstan).
- 2007: The Outside World (Le monde extérieur) – documentary film broadcast by Arte (54 min – shot in Paris).
- 2007: Night Rising on Clouds (Nuages apportant la nuit) – documentary film broadcast by Voyages (30 min – shot in New Guinea).
- 2008: The Empty House (La maison vide) – documentary film broadcast by Arte (52 min – shot in New Mexico).
- 2009: Ascent to the Sky (La montée au ciel) – documentary film broadcast by Arte (52 min – shot in Nepal).
- 2013: A Few Days Together (Quelques jours ensemble) – documentary film broadcast by Arte (90 min – shot in Russia).
- 2013: The Departed – video installation (20 min – shot in Russia).
- 2013: Before Me, Dark Forests (Devant moi, les forêts sombres) – documentary film broadcast by France 5 (52 min – to be shot in Russia) – in preparation.

== Film production ==
Breton founded and supervised a non-fiction film series for the Musée du quai Branly in Paris, France entitled The Ways of the World (L'usage du monde), co-produced by Les Films d'Ici, Arte and the Musée du quai Branly. He was its artistic director.

This six-film series is a record of local humanity at the dawning of the 21st century, in the same way as Albert Kahn had undertaken at the beginning of last century with Archives of the Planet (Les archives de la planète) by sending photographers and filmmakers around the world.

- 2007: The Men from Forest 21 (Les hommes de la forêt 21) – a 52 min film by Julien Samani broadcast by Arte (shot in Gabon).
- 2008: Northern Light (Lumière du Nord) – a 52 min film by Sergey Loznitsa broadcast by Arte (shot in Russia).
- 2008: Coal Money (L'argent du charbon) – a 52 min film by Wang Bing broadcast by Arte (shot in China).
- 2008: The Empty House (La maison vide) – a 52 min film by Stéphane Breton broadcast by Arte (shot in New Mexico).
- 2009: Ascent to the Sky (La montée au ciel) – a 52 min film by Stéphane Breton broadcast by Arte (shot in Nepal).
- 2010: We need Happiness (Il nous faut du bonheur) – a 47 min film by Alexander Sokurov and Aleksey Jankowsky broadcast by Arte (shot in Kurdistan).

== Prizes ==
In 2005, Breton received the prize for "best documentary of the year" awarded by the French Société Civile des Auteurs Multimédia for Heaven in a Garden (Le ciel dans un jardin).

== Exhibitions ==
- 2006–2007: curator of What is a Body? (Qu'est-ce qu'un corps ?), an exhibition of anthropology at the Musée du quai Branly (with the collaboration of Michèle Coquet, Michael Houseman, Jean-Marie Schaeffer, Anne-Christine Taylor and Eduardo Viveiros de Castro).
- 2010–2011: curator of Dans le blanc des yeux, masques primitifs du Népal, an exhibition of anthropology at the Musée du quai Branly (with the collaboration of Marc Petit).

== Publications ==
Stéphane Breton writes articles in anthropology and the philosophy of the social sciences (Esprit, L'Homme, American Ethnologist, Social Anthropology, Current Anthropology).

He published:

- 1989: La mascarade des sexes, Calmann-Lévy, (an essay in anthropology) – ISBN 2702118313.
- 1991: Les fleuves immobiles, Calmann-Lévy, (travel narrative in New Guinea) – ISBN 2702120334.
- 1991: Des hommes nommés brume (with Jean-Louis Motte), Arthaud, (photo book and travel narrative in New Guinea) – ISBN 2700309596.
- 2005: Télévision, Grasset, (a semiotic essay about film and television) – ISBN 2012792901.
- 2006: Qu'est-ce qu'un corps ? Musée du quai Branly & Flammarion, (an essay in anthropology, exhibition catalogue, with the collaboration of Michèle Coquet, Michael Houseman, Jean-Marie Schaeffer, Anne-Christine Taylor and Eduardo Viveiros de Castro) – ISBN 2915133174.
