= Kombai people =

Papuan ethnic group

Khoba

Total population
- 5,650

Regions with significant populations
- Indonesia (South Papua)

Languages
- Kombai language, Indonesian language

Related ethnic groups
- Korowai, Wanggom

The Kombai are a Papuan people living in the Indonesian province of South Papua, more specifically in Mappi Regency. Their total population is about 5,650.

== Etymology ==
The name kombay comes from the word khoba, meaning 'people', and their language is called khobaye-lu meaning 'human language'.

== Way of life ==
The Kombai people live in clans, each clan having its own territory called mburu (cognate with Korowai's boluf). The boundaries of mburu with the uninhabited forests are called rerikho. Areas inside the mburu are considered the source for food for the clans, which include: yards called yarimo and are cultivated to produce vegetables, sweet potatoes, bananas, tobacco, and to raise poultry. Swampy areas are cultivated to grow sago, and fields become places for women to collect leaves for ingredients or medicinal purposes.

Usually, the center of the mburu will be the ramo dumo, the central and sacred tree house belonging to the eldest member of the patriclan and his immediate family. This sacred treehouse is thought to act as a defense from enemy attacks, and is closely guarded by men with bows and arrows. As his sons mature and get married, they will move out and form their own treehouses near the primary tree house.

Kombai created three types of houses inside their clan area. Most of these houses are stilt house with the central pillar being a large tree pruned forming a tree house. The tree houses for residence are called guoro, usually built around 3–15 meters above ground. A taller treehouse is called walina, usually built 15 meters or more above ground and used as a lookout for men. The shortest is called ibena, built near ground level, and is used by women when giving birth or during their menstrual cycles. Large ibena are used for sago grub festivals.

Like many other Papuan ethnic tribes, the Kombai people are hunter-gatherers. They hunt pigs and other forest animals, using small dogs to track down and kill their prey. In order to fish, the Kombai build small dams in the stream and pour a poison from a toxic root into the water. This forces the fish to come to the surface, making them easy to catch. Food is cooked using stones previously heated in a fire placed on top of meat wrapped in large leaves. As food is abundant in the forest, none is stored.

The Kombai also eat the larvae of the capricorn beetle, called sago grub, which is considered a delicacy. To harvest them, a sago tree is cut down and left for a month, then wrapped in leaves and left to rot for three months, after which time the larvae are collected. This traditional food is used in festivities with neighboring clans and tribes to strengthen social ties.

== Documentaries ==
British adventurer and TV presenter Bruce Parry lived with the Kombai in season 1, episode 3 of his documentary series, Tribe (2005).

A television series on The Discovery Channel entitled Living with the Kombai in the US, and on both the National Geographic Channel and The Discovery Channel, named World's Lost Tribes in the United Kingdom, was shown in January 2007. In the series, two men travelled to Papua and spent several months living with an extended Kombai family. Their adventures included hunting for a large lizard and a wild pig, and fishing by constructing a rudimentary dam on a stream. They also helped chop down large trees with a stone axe, made sago from the sago palm tree, and used its fibres to build a treehouse nearly 80 feet off the ground.

The Kombai were also featured in the 2007 season of the series Mark & Olly: Living with the Tribes.

The Kombai people also appeared in Going to Extremes series 2: 'Surviving Extremes' (2003) in the Swamp episode. The host, Nick Middleton, stays with the tribe and climbs the treehouses.

Finnish TV show Madventures has done an episode involving Kombai and Korowai tribes in West-Papua in season 2 episode 6.

== See also ==
- Indigenous people of New Guinea
