= Boven Digoel Regency =

Regency in South Papua, Indonesia

Boven Digoel Regency Kabupaten Boven Digoel
- Regency
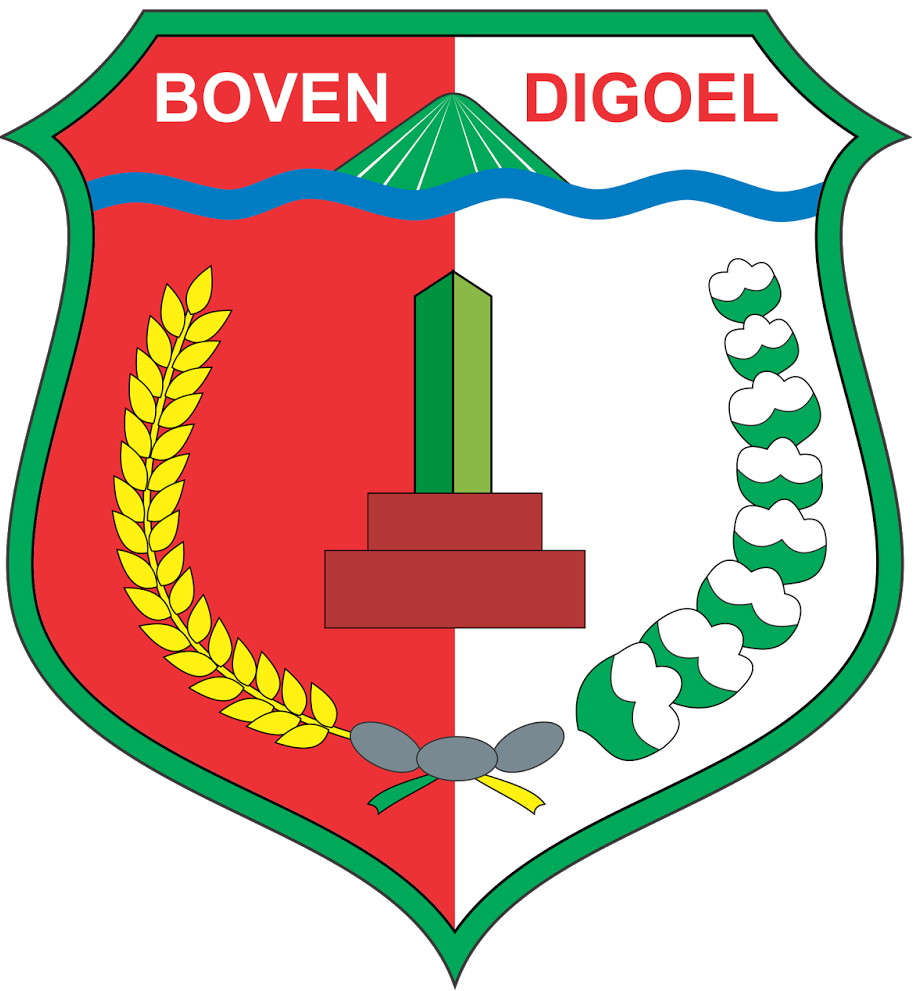
- Coat of arms
- Motto: Nup Bagen Ngup Bagenep (I Am Because You Are)

- Location in Western New Guinea and Indonesia Boven Digoel Regency (Indonesia)
- Coordinates: 5.7400°S 140.3482°E
- Country: Indonesia
- Province: South Papua
- Regency seat: Tanah Merah

Government
  - Regent: Roni Omba
  - Vice Regent: Marlinus

Area
  - Total: 27,108.29 km^{2} (10,466.57 sq mi)

Population (mid 2024 estimate)
  - Total: 71,997
  - Density: 2.6559/km^{2} (6.8788/sq mi)
- Time zone: UTC+9 (Indonesia Eastern Time)
- Area code: (+62) 975
- Website: bovendigoelkab.go.id

Boven Digoel Regency is an inland regency (kabupaten) in the northeastern part of the Indonesian province of South Papua. It was split off from Merauke Regency (of which it used to be a part) on 12 November 2002. It is bordered to the south by the residual Merauke Regency, to the west by Mappi Regency, and to the north by the province of Highland Papua. At the same time, to the east lies the international border with Papua New Guinea.

The regency covers an area of 27,108.29 km^{2} (10,466.57 sq mi), and the total population was 55,784 at the 2010 Census and 64,285 at the 2020 Census; the official estimate as of mid-2024 was 71,997 (comprising 38,130 males and 33,867 females). The administrative centre is the town of Tanah Merah (or Persatuan kampung) in the Mandobo District.

== Administrative districts ==
The regency comprises twenty districts (distrik), tabulated below with their areas and their populations at the 2010 Census and the 2020 Census, together with the official estimates as of mid-2024. The table also includes the locations of the district administrative centres, the number of administrative villages (kampung) in each district, and their postcode.

Regional Code	Name of District (distrik)	Area in km^{2}	Pop'n 2010 Census	Pop'n 2020 Census	Pop'n mid-2024 Estimate	Admin centre	No. of villages	Post code
93.02.05	Jair	3,061.73	17,482	18,179	16,461	Getentiri	5	99651
93.02.15	Subur	2,660.09	1,224	1,470	1,730	Subur	5	99653
93.02.19	Ki	2,050.60	1,701	1,729	2,172	Ujungkia	4	99652
93.02.02	Mindiptana	448.17	3,622	3,799	4,481	Mindiptana	13	99663
93.02.08	Iniyandit	379.65	833	1,006	1,220	Langgoan	5	99661
93.02.07	Kombut	660.93	691	1,135	1,371	Kombut	4	99662
93.02.18	Sesnuk	1,306.63	2,102	918	1,055	Sesnuk	5	99664
93.02.01	Mandobo	2,699.51	12,840	20,027	23,222	Tanah Merah	5	99674
93.02.10	Fofi	2,466.70	1,987	2,690	3,128	Makmur/Ikisi	8	99673
93.02.09	Arimop	1,311.77	1,270	1,631	2,327	Maju	7	99671
93.02.04	Kouh	467.25	1,186	1,093	1,123	Kouh	3	99655
93.02.06	Bomakia	1,082.95	2,196	2,475	2,954	Bomakia I	5	99672
93.02.13	Firiwage	1,219.97	1,088	845	1,307	Firiwage	4	99691
93.02.12	Manggelum	1,289.65	1,188	836	1,166	Manggelum	6	99692
93.02.14	Yaniruma	1,611.04	866	1,025	1,358	Yaniruma	3	99685
93.02.20	Kawagit	904.23	1,001	1,139	1,445	Kawagit	6	99654
93.02.16	Kombay	830.91	1,263	1,028	1,267	Wanggemalo	5	99682
93.02.03	Waropko	1,086.97	1,910	1,993	2,472	Woropko	9	99684
93.02.11	Ambatkwi	1,282.38	743	449	770	Kuken	5	99681
93.02.17	Ninati	287.07	591	818	968	Ninati	5	99683
	Totals	27,108.29	55,784	64,285	71,997	Tanah Merah	112	

== History ==
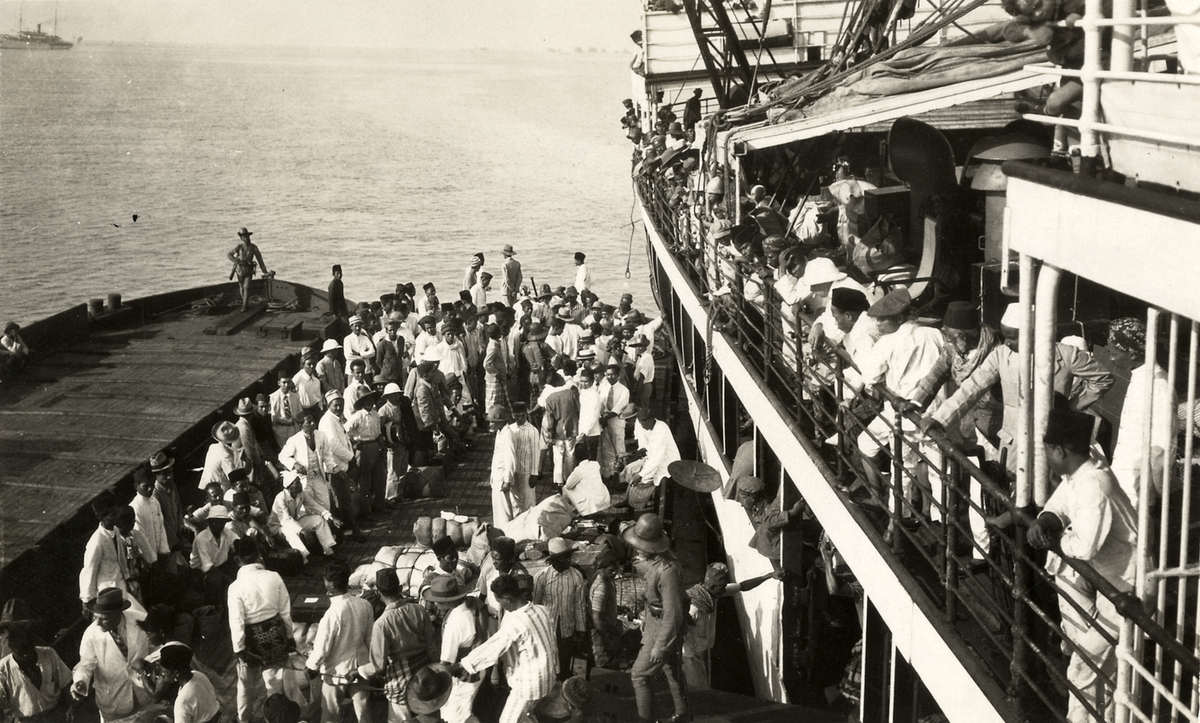
Communist prisoners to Boven Digoel in 1927; 99 years ago

In the Dutch East Indies era, the present Boven Digoel Regency was known as Digul Atas (Upper Digul), located on the banks of the Digul River.

Boven-Digoel was a Dutch prison camp in the Dutch East Indies at the headwaters of the Digul River, where Indonesian nationalists and communists were interned between 1928 and 1942. Initially set to accommodate prisoners of the 1926 revolt led by the Communist Party of Indonesia, Boven-Digoel later was used as an exile for the national movement figures with a recorded number of prisoners of 1,308 people. Among the figures exiled, were Mohammad Hatta, Sutan Sjahrir, Sayuti Melik, and Marco Kartodikromo.

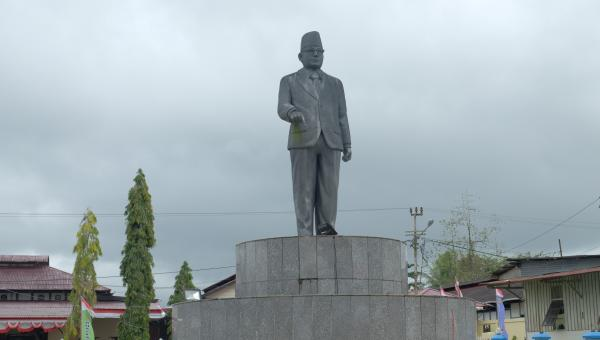
Statue in rememberence of Mohammad Hatta near the airport and former prison building.

When the Pacific War broke out and Japan occupied Indonesia, Boven-Digoel prisoners were evacuated by the Dutch to Australia. The transfer was based on concerns that the prisoners would rebel if they remained at Boven-Digoel. It was hoped that the Indonesians brought to Australia would help the Dutch. It turned out that these political prisoners influenced the Australian trade union to boycott the Dutch ships that landed in the country. After the Allies won, the prisoners were returned to their original places in Indonesia.

The camp was reused to imprison Indonesian nationalists from Papua during the West New Guinea dispute such as J.A. Dimara, Petrus Korwa, and Hanoch Rumbrar.
