= Telefol language =

Language spoken in Papua New Guinea

Telefol
- Native to: Papua New Guinea
- Region: Sandaun Province, Telefomin District
- Ethnicity: Telefol people
- Native speakers: (5,400 cited 1994)
- Language family: Trans–New Guinea: Central & South New Guinea ?; Ok; Mountain; Telefol

Language codes
- ISO 639-3: tlf
- Glottolog: tele1256
- ELP: Telefol

Telefol is a language spoken by the Telefol people in Papua New Guinea, notable for possessing a base-27 numeral system.

== History ==
The Iligimin people also spoke Telefol, but they were defeated by the Telefol proper.

== Orthography ==
Telefol alphabet
| Phonemic | ɑ | ɑː | e | eː | i | iː | o | oː | u | uː | b | d̪ | ɸ | k | kʷ | l | m | n̪ | ŋ | s̪ | t̪ | w | j |
| Lowercase | a | aa | e | e | i | ii | o | o | u | uu | b, p | d, g | f | k, g | kw | l | m | n | ng | s | t | w | y |
| Uppercase | A | Aa | E | | I | Ii | O | | U | Uu | B | D | F | K | Kw | | M | N | | S | T | W | Y |

Single ⟨e⟩ and ⟨o⟩ represent both their single and long vowels, since they rarely contrast.

/b/ is written ⟨p⟩ pre-consonantally and word-finally.

Single /k/ is written ⟨g⟩ intervocalically, and /kk/ is written ⟨k⟩ intervocalically.

/kd/ and /ŋd/ are written ⟨kg⟩ and ⟨ngg⟩ (since they're pronounced [ɡ] and [ŋɡ] respectively).

Initial /ɡ/ is also written with ⟨g⟩ in loan words, e.g., Got 'God'.

== Phonology ==
=== Consonants ===
Consonants
| | Labial | Dental | Alveolar | Palatal | Velar | (Glottal) |
|---|---|---|---|---|---|---|
| Nasal | m | n̪ | | | ŋ | |
| Plosive | (p) b | t̪ d̪ | | | k kʷ (ɡ) | (ʔ) |
| Fricative | f | s̪ | | | | (h) |
| Lateral | | | l | | | |
| Semivowel | w | | | j | | |

/ʔ/ and /h/ only appear in a few particles and some exclamations. /p/ and /ɡ/ only appear in a few loans.

Allophones
| Phoneme(s) | Condition | Allophone |
|---|---|---|
| /b/ | intervocalic | [b~β] |
| /b/ | syllable-final | [pʰ] |
| /f/ | free-variation | [f~ɸ] |
| /k/ | intervocalic | [ɣ] |
| /l/ | intervocalic | [ɾ] |
| /kd/ | (everywhere) | [ɡ] |
| /ŋd/ | (everywhere) | [ŋɡ] |

=== Vowels ===
Vowels
| | Front | Central | Back |
|---|---|---|---|
| Close | i iː | | u uː |
| Mid | e eː | | o oː |
| Open | | ɑ ɑː | |

There are two contrastive phonemic tones in Telefol, high and low. For example, ùlín 'club' vs. úlìn 'planted'.

/e/ and /eː/, /o/ and /oː/, are nearly in complementary distribution. Also, single /e/ and /o/ don't occur in one-syllable words or in terminal syllables.

Vowel length only contrasts in initial syllables. However, in initial syllables single /u/ and /o/, and /i/ and /e/, don't contrast.

=== Phonotactics ===
Syllable structure is (C)V(ː)(C).

/l/ does not occur word-initially.

/ŋ/ is allowed in medial, but not word-initial, onsets.

== Grammar ==
Telefol is a subject–object–verb language.

=== Verbal aspect ===
Telefol has a rich aspectual system. Telefol verbs have "punctiliar" (momentary/completed) and "continuative" stems.

=== Counting system ===
Telefol uses a base-27 counting system. This is mapped onto the body by counting each of the following: the left pinky to the left thumb (1–5); the wrist, lower arm, elbow, upper arm, and shoulder (6–10); the side of the neck, ear, and left eye (11–13); the nose (14); and similarly on the right side in reverse order, from the right eye to the right pinky (15–27).

=== Kinship ===
Telefol has dyadic kinship terms (terms referring to the relationship two or more people have to each other), which are uncommon in the world's languages and not prevalent in Papua New Guinea. However, they are a salient feature of the Ok languages. Related terms are found in Oksapmin, Mian, and Tifal.

== Evolution ==
Below are some reflexes of proto-Trans-New Guinea proposed by Pawley (2012):

| proto-Trans-New Guinea | Telefol |
|---|---|
| *m(o,u)k ‘milk, sap, breast’ | müük, mɔk ‘spittle’ |
| *maŋgat[a] ‘teeth, mouth’ | (Faiwol makat-kalim ‘whiskers’) |
| *maŋgV ‘compact round object’ | magap ‘round object, fruit, seed, etc’’ |
| *m(i,u)ndu ‘nose’ | mutu ‘nose’ |
| *k(o,u)ma(n,ŋ)[V] ‘neck, nape’ | kum ‘left side of neck’ |
| *kumut, *tumuk ‘thunder’ | tumuun ‘thunder’ |
| *niman ‘louse’ | tim ‘louse’ |
| *kal(a,i)m ‘moon’ | kaliim ‘moon’ |
| *k(i,u)tuma ‘night, morning’ | kutim ‘morning’ |
| *na ‘1SG’ | na- |
| *ni, *nu ‘1PL’ | nu |
| *mbena ‘arm’ | ban ‘forearm’ |
| *[w]ani ‘who?’ | wan(tap), waan(ta) ‘who?’ |
| *pVnum ‘wind’ | inim |
| *kinV ‘shoulder’ | tiŋ (Faiwal kiiŋ) |
| *mbilaŋ ‘tongue’ | fɔŋ (cf. Faiwol falaŋ, Tifal filaŋ) |
| *mbena ‘arm’ | ban ‘forearm’ |
| *amba ‘sibling’ | baab |
| *(kambu)-sumbu ‘ashes’ | (ku)-tab |
| *mbilaŋ ‘tongue’ | foŋ (Tifal filaŋ) |
| *(mb,p)ututu- ‘to fly’ | (?) fúlúluú (+ V.) |
| *pVnum ‘wind’ | (?) inim |
| *m(i,u)ndu ‘nose’ | mutuum |
| *kumut, *tumuk ‘thunder’ | tumuun |
| *k(i,u)tuma ‘night, morning’ | kutim |
| *ŋgatu(k,n) ‘knee’ | katuun |
| *k(a,e)(nd,t)ak ‘neck’ | ditak (Faiwal getak) |
| *saŋ ‘story, song’ | saŋ ‘myth, story’ |
| *sumbu ‘ashes’ | (ku-)tab |
| *maŋgV ‘compact round object’ | (úún) makáb ‘egg’ |
| *maŋgat[a] ‘teeth, mouth’ | (Faiwal makat-kalim ‘whiskers (lit. chin-hair)’) |
| *kal(a,i)m ‘moon’ | kaliim |
| *k(o,u)ma(n,ŋ)[V] ‘neck, nape’ | kum ‘left side of neck’ |
| *k(o,u)ndVC ‘bone’ | kun |
| *kutV(mb,p)(a,u)[C] ‘long’ | (Kati M. kudub) |
| *kinV ‘shoulder’ | tiŋ- |
| *m(o,u)k ‘milk, sap, breast’ | múúk |
| *ok[V] ‘water’ | óók |
| *(ŋg,k)a(nd,t)apu ‘skin, bark’ | káál |
| *kal(a,i)m ‘moon’ | *kaliim |

== See also ==
- Ok languages

== Bibliography ==
- Foley, William A. (1986). The Papuan Languages of New Guinea. Cambridge: Cambridge University Press. ISBN 0-521-28621-2. OCLC 13004531.
- Healey, Alan (September 1992). "Telefol Organised Phonology Data" (PDF). Archived from the original (PDF) on 22 October 2012.
- Healey, Alan (1974). "A problem of Telefol verb classification". In Loving, Richard (ed.). Studies in languages of the Ok family. Workpapers in Papua New Guinea Languages. Vol. 7. Ukarumpa: Summer Institute of Linguistics. pp. 167–175.
- Healey, Alan (1964). Telefol phonology. Pacific Linguistics, Series B. Vol. 3. Canberra: Australian National University. doi:10.15144/PL-B3.
