= Bimin language =

Ok language spoken in New Guinea

Bimin
- Region: Papua New Guinea
- Native speakers: 2,300 (2003)
- Language family: Trans–New Guinea: Central & South New Guinea ?; Ok; Mountain Ok; Bimin

Language codes
- ISO 639-3: bhl
- Glottolog: bimi1240
- ELP: Bimin
- OK-Oksapmin Languages

Bim or Bimin is one of the Ok languages of New Guinea. It is spoken in Sandaun and Western Provinces in the region between the Murray and Strickland Rivers. The language is related to Faiwol but there is also "much intermarriage and cultural exchange with Oksapmin".

== Phonology ==
=== Consonants ===
Consonants
		Labial	Alveolar	Velar
Plosive	Voiceless		t	k
Plosive	Voiced	b	d	g
Nasal		m	n	ŋ
Lateral			l	
Fricative		f	s	

- /k/ can be pronounced [kχ]~[χ]~[gχ]~[ɣ].
- /g/ is [g] in syllable onsets and [ŋ] in syllable codas.
- Intervocalic /b/ is "almost like" /w/ or [β].
- /f/ is [w] syllable initially and intervocalically and [p] syllable finally.
- /l/ is [l]~[ɾ] and never occurs word initially.

=== Vowels ===
Vowels
	Front	Central	Back
High	i		u
Mid	e		o
Low		a	

- Weber (2003) uses [ɐ] instead of [a].
