= Yonggom language =

Ok language spoken in Indonesia and Papua New Guinea

Yonggom
- Yongkom
- Native to: Indonesia, Papua New Guinea
- Region: Western Province, Papua New Guinea; South Papua; Boven Digoel
- Native speakers: (6,000 cited 1999)
- Language family: Trans–New Guinea: Central & South New Guinea ?; Ok; Lowland Ok; Yonggom

Language codes
- ISO 639-3: yon
- Glottolog: yong1280
- ELP: Yonggom

Yonggom is one of the Ok languages of Indonesia and Papua New Guinea. According to its speakers, it is part of a continuum of 9 mutually intelligible dialects of Muyu languages which also includes Muyu, North Muyu (Kadi), South Muyu, and Ningrum. Petabahasa by Indonesian Ministry of Education classified this language as Yonggom/Yongkom (BPS:1158 6) spoken in Kampung Ninati, although another name recorded for South Muyu (BPS:0917 2) is Yongon.

== Phonology ==
=== Consonants ===
		Labial	Alveolar	Palatal	Velar
Nasal		m	n		ŋ
Plosive	voiceless	p	t		k kʷ
Plosive	voiced	b	d		ɡ
Fricative			s		
Tap			ɾ		
Approximant		w	(l)	j	

- /b, d/ can become fricatives [β, ð] intervocalically in fast speech.
- /k/ can be heard as a fricative [ɣ] in fast speech.
- /ɾ/ becomes [l] in word-initial position.
- /j/ is heard as an affricate [dʒ] when following a plosive.

=== Vowels ===
	Front	Central	Back
Close	i iː		u uː
Mid	ɛ ɛː		o oː
Open		a aː	

- /i/ becomes [ɪ] when before /s/ or a word-final /n/.
- /ɛ/ becomes more close as [e] when before a sonorant back consonant.
