= Tifal language =

Ok language spoken in Papua New Guinea

Tifal
- Tifalmin
- Native to: Papua New Guinea
- Region: Sandaun Province, Telefomin District
- Ethnicity: incl. Urapmin
- Native speakers: 4,000 (2003)
- Language family: Trans–New Guinea: Central & South New Guinea ?; Ok; Mountain; Tifal
- Dialects: Tifal–Urap; Atbal

Language codes
- ISO 639-3: tif – inclusive code Individual code: urm – Urap
- Glottolog: tifa1245 Tifal urap1239 Urapmin
- ELP: Tifal; Urapmin

Tifal is an Ok language spoken in Papua New Guinea. Dialects are Tifal (Tifalmin), Urap (Urapmin) and Atbal (Atbalmin).

== Geography ==
The Tifal language is bounded by the border with Irian Jaya to the west, Papuan speakers to the south, the Telefomin valley in the east, and the Sepik river to the north.

== Orthography ==
Phonemic	ɑ	ɑː	b	d	eː	f	i	iː	k	l	m	n	ŋ	o	oː	s	t	u	uː	w	j
Lowercase	a	aa	b, p	d	e	f	i	ii	k	l	m	n	ng	o	oo	s	t	u	uu	w	y
Uppercase	A	Aa	B	D	E	F	I	Ii	K	L	M	N		O	Oo	S	T	U	Uu	W	Y

== Phonology ==
=== Consonants ===
Consonants
	Labial	Alveolar	Dorsal
Plosive	b	t d	k
Nasal	m	n	ŋ
Fricative	f	s	
Approximant	w	l	j

/b/ is realized as [pʰ] word finally, as [p] in syllable-coda position before a consonant, and [b] elsewhere.
/t/ is realized as [t] in syllable coda before a consonant and [tʰ] elsewhere.
/d/ is realized as [ɾ] intervocalically, e.g. /didab/: [dɪˈɾʌpʰ] 'water container'.
/k/ is [ɣ] intervocalically, [k] in syllable coda before consonants, and [kʰ] elsewhere.
/s/ is realized as [ʂ] before /u/.
/l/ is alveolar adjacent to back vowels and alveodental elsewhere. One dialect realizes /l/ as [r] intervocalically.

=== Vowels ===
Vowels
	Front	Central	Back
Close	i iː		u uː
Mid	eː		o oː
Open		ɑ ɑː	

/o/ and /oː/ rarely contrast.

Vowel allophones
Phoneme	Condition	Allophone	Realization elsewhere
/i/	word-initially and finally	[i]	[ɪ]
/a/	word-initially and finally	[a]	[ʌ]
/u/	word-initially and finally	[u]	[ʊ]
/eː/	in open syllables, before /m/, and between /j/ and /p/	[eː]	[ɛː]
/o/	before /n/ or /ŋ/; between /t/ and /k/	[ɔ]	[o]

=== Phonotactics ===
Syllable structure is (C)V(ː)(C). The expression kwiin takan 'oh my!' may be an exception.

/d/ only occurs word-initially. /f/ only occurs syllable-initially. /ŋ/ is always syllable-final.

Initial /l/ only occurs in some dialects. Initial /kw/ occurs in two dialects, and may usually be interpreted as C+V.

/w/ and /j/ occur syllable-initially. Only one dialect allows syllable-coda /j/.

=== Stress ===
In inflected words stress lies on the last syllable of the verb stem. If there are long vowels stress falls on the first syllable in the word. If all vowels are short, stress falls on the last syllable. If it is closed stress falls on the first syllable.

== Grammar ==
=== Nouns ===
Nouns are not inflected but may mark possession. Body parts and kinship terms are obligatorily possessed, and some kinship terms require affixing. On other nouns possession is optional, except for proper names which are never possessed.

=== Pronouns ===
Pronoun stems
Person			Basic	Emphatic
1	singular		ni-/na-	nala-/nalal-/-nila
1	plural		nuu-/no-	nuulu-/nulul-
2	singular	m	kab-	kaltab-/kalab-
2	singular	f	kub-	kultub-/kulub-
2	plural		kib-	kiltib-
3	singular	m	a-	ala-/alal-/al-
3	singular	f	u-	ulu-/ulul-/ul-
3	plural		ib-/i-	iltib-/ilib-/ilal-/il-

Non-emphatic pronouns
Suffix meaning:	Poss.	Subj.	Definitive	Inst.	First	with, and, also
Suffix:	-mi~ni	-i~-di	-yo	ta	-siik/-siin	soo/soono

Emphatic pronouns
Suffix meaning:	Poss.	Inst.	'only'	'like, simile'
Suffix:	-mi~ni	ta	-kal	tab

== Verbs ==
Tifal has a rich aspectual system. Verbs may be separated into four groups based on how they transform from continuative to punctiliar aspect. Some only have vowel and/or simple stem changes, some have suppletive stems, some change compound-final stems, and some which have allomorphs which add -(a)laa-min (or rarely -daa-laa-min) to the stem.

Verbs also can be divided based on transitivity. Some require direct objects, some with optional objects, some with optional locational objects, and a few intransitive verbs.

Order of verb suffixes
verb	ben.	ben.	-laa	tense	person	mood	statement-final marker

=== Tense and aspect ===
Most final verbs mark tense, mood, and person, but most verbs can mark aspect and not tense and still be a final verb.

Tense-aspect suffixes
	Continuative	Punctiliar
pres	-b/m^{1}	-d
yesterday past	^{1}-m-som/-a-som	-b
dist. past	-a-s	
very remote past	-bis	-s
abilitative	^{1}-m-am	^{1}-d-am
near future	^{1}-m-okom	^{1}-d-okom
dist. future	^{1}-m-okob	^{1}-d-okob

1. "initial consonant of the customary or class changing marker is retained"

Tifal sentences are contain inflected verb-root-chains, often with a final fully conjugated verb. One must inflect for the amount of time between one verb in the chain and the next.

=== Deixis ===
Marking spatial relation between verbs and their objects is obligatory. "up" must be clarified as either "upslope" or "upstream", "down" as "downslope" or "downstream", and "across" as "across land" or "across a river".

=== Kinship ===
Tifal has dyadic kinship terms (terms referring to the relationship two or more people have to each other), which are present in less than 10 languages and not prevalent in Papua New Guinea. However, they are a salient feature of the Ok languages. Related terms are found in Oksapmin, Mian, and Telefol.

== See also ==
- Urapmin language

== Bibliography ==
- Boush, Al; Boush, Susan (1974), Tifal phonology (Manuscript), archived from the original on 2012-10-11
- Boush, Al (1975), Tifal grammar essentials (Manuscript), archived from the original on 2012-10-11
- Boush, Al (1979), Aspect on Tifal final and medial verbs (Manuscript), archived from the original on 2012-10-11
- Tifal Organised Phonology Data (Manuscript), Boush, Al (compiler), 1994, archived from the original on 2012-10-11
