= TKX =

TKX may refer to:

- tkx, the ISO 639-3 code for Tangko language
- Takaroa Airport, the IATA code TKX
- Kennett Memorial Airport, the FAA LID code TKX
- Tilkan railway station, the station code TKX
- Prototype for the Japanese Type 10 main battle tank, see Type 10 § Development history
