= Muyu language =

Ok language of Western New Guinea

Muyu
- Kati
- Native to: Indonesia
- Region: South Papua; Boven Digoel
- Ethnicity: Muyu
- Native speakers: 22,000 (2002)
- Language family: Trans–New Guinea: Central & South New Guinea ?; Ok; Lowland Ok; Muyu

Language codes
- ISO 639-3: Either: kti – North Muyu (Niinati) kts – South Muyu (Metomka)
- Glottolog: nort2916 North sout2940 South

Muyu, Moyu, is one of the Ok languages of South Papua, Indonesia.

Based on available resources, linguists divided it to two varieties Kadi (North Muyu) and South Muyu. However, according to native speakers, it may be a dialect continuum of 9 mutually intelligible dialects which also include Ningrum and Yonggom. Petabahasa by Indonesia Ministry of Education classified it to three languages, Kadi spoken in Kampung Woropko, South Muyu spoken in Kampung Anggumbit, and Muyu in Kampung Kamka.

== Phonology ==
Consonants
	Labial	Alveolar	Palatal	Velar
Plosive	b	t		k
Nasal	m	n		ŋ
Liquid		l		
Approximant	w		j	

Vowels
	Front	Back
Close	i	u
Mid	e	o
Open	a, (a:)	

The stop consonants are represented orthographically as either voiceless ⟨p, t, k⟩ or voiced ⟨b, d, g⟩ consonants, reflecting the language's allophonic rules.

== Grammar ==
=== Overview ===
The typical constituent order of a clause in Muyu is verb final. Role marking of core arguments is largely done through subject agreement on finite verbs, with a small number of verbs also indexing their object, and some verbs displaying verbal number alternations. Nouns lack bound morphology; postpositions, relational nouns, and a multipurpose oblique clitic serve to mark peripheral roles, while core arguments are unmarked by default. Verbs are morphologically complex; in addition to indexing their participants, they also take suffixes indicating aspect and mood, they may be marked for switch-reference, and there are a number of non-finite forms. Complex predicates are frequent in Muyu, including light verb constructions, auxiliary verbs, and multi-verb constructions, where each verb contributes its lexical meaning to express a complex event. Chains of multiple clauses in a row, where all but the final are marked for switch-reference, are frequently used to link multiple events together.

=== Nouns, their modifiers, and the noun phrase ===
==== Nouns and pronouns ====
Nouns are morphologically simple. There is a grammatical gender system, in which the two genders are masculine and feminine. Gender agreement surfaces on the verb, where subject and object indexes distinguish masculine and feminine in the third person singular, and on pronouns, where the second person singular also makes a gender distinction. Grammatical gender assignment for humans or animals is based on their sex/gender, while there seems to be no clear pattern for inanimates, and often masculine agreement is used as default even for a feminine inanimate noun. Kin terms behave differently to other nouns; they are the only nouns able to take morphology, a plural -a suffix, and many have two seemingly unrelated forms, based on whether the kin is discussed in relation to a 3rd person, or a 1st or 2nd person; when discussing "his/her/their father", one would use adi, while for "my/your father", emba is used. The infinitive form of the verb, produced with the suffix -i, can be used as a verbal noun.

Personal pronouns distinguish all three persons, and the number singular and plural, while the second and third person pronouns also make a gender distinction. The pronouns may not be used when referring to inanimates.

==== Common modifiers of nouns ====
Adjectives follow the head noun in the noun phrase, or can head a nonverbal predicate, and be intensified by the word kai following them. They can be derived to form inchoative verbs meaning "become (adjective)" with either the suffix -n or -teleb, the first producing a singular verb, the latter a plural verb.

Quantifiers follow the noun, and include numerals and non-numeral quantifiers. Numerals above alopmin "three" are rarely used, and often are also words for body parts, indicative of a body-tally counting system. The quantifiers kadap and timung both indicate a large quantity, "many" or "much", while kumun means "all".

There are a large number of demonstratives in Muyu, built on the bound forms e- and o-, which are analysed as proximal and unspecified for deixis, respectively, as well as elevational demonstratives which also include specification for height, with the consonants d and n in the forms used for high and low elevation, such as eyadi, eyani "up here, down here". The forms edo, odo, and ege, ogo can both function as adnominal (following the head noun) or pronominal demonstratives for subjects and direct objects, and mark a relative clause, while only the -do forms can be used identificationally, and only the -g(e/o) forms can be used adnominally in indirect object or adjunct noun phrases. The forms eya, oya have adverbial function, like English here, there. Other forms include other kinds of information, such as marking a referent as nonvisible, marking it as the boundary of space or movement as in "until", or as contrastive with another referent.

==== Role-marking ====
The noun phrase can be followed by the oblique clitic =bet, which has diverse functions, its exact interpretation often depending on syntactic position, or context. It can express the location of an event, or the goal or source of a movement; the instrument used to carry out an action, the time an event takes place, or the items/substance from which only some is affected in sentences like "they took some of the dogs". It can even be used to mark the subject of a verb, emphasising it in some way, such as when the object is placed before the subject in the clause, to contrast the subject with other possible subjects, to indicate that an inanimate referent is the subject, along with other functions.

There are spatial relation nouns which can be possessed and head a noun phrase, like yondem "behind", or bun "outside, and postpositions, such as tap "under, and ya "at", which cannot be possessed or head a noun phrase, but both word types fulfill similar functions of expressing location. Other postpositions mark different functions too, such as adep "like", or yeman "for", and some postpositions may have a clause as their complement as well.

==== The noun phrase ====
In the noun phrase, the head slot (which may be empty) has one slot before it, which can be filled by a possessor or a relative clause. Following the head is a slot for modifiers, both adjectives and relative clauses; then quantifiers; and then finally determiners. Postpositions generally come after all other elements, but in order to modify a noun with both a postposition and a demonstrative, the demonstrative must come after the postposition, however. Pronominal possessors directly precede the possessed noun, while a third person pronoun indexing the possessor may separate a nominal possessor from the possessum. Similarly, a pronoun separates a prenominal relative clause from the head noun, though it is obligatory, and fixed in the third person singular masculine form. Postnominal relative clauses, on the other hand, are obligatorily followed by a demonstrative in the determiner slot.

Noun phrases can be coordinated by juxtaposition, or by yom, or yanop, which otherwise function as a comitative postposition, or both a comitative postposition and an existential particle, respectively, following each coordinand.

=== Verbs and predicates ===
Verbs are morphologically complex. What exactly is marked on a verb is dependent on both syntactic position, and lexical specification, but indexing the person, number, and gender of their subject, and their objects (obligatory for some verbs, optional for most), marking aspect and mood, taking switch-reference markers, having distinct stems based on verbal number/pluractionality, and a few non-finite forms, are all possibilities.

A verbal predicate may consist of multiple words, a Complex Predicate, in the form of auxiliary verb constructions, light verb constructions, and multi-verb constructions. Auxiliary verbs have grammatical meaning and do not generally occur alone, while light verbs allow nouns or adjectives to function like a verbal predicate (e.g. umkan "blood" can be followed by the light verb wai, to mean "bleed"), while in multi verb constructions, all the verbs involved use their lexical meaning.

Muyu has a system of verbal number, in which some verbs have two stems, based on whether their subject if intransitive, their object if transitive, or the number of times the event occurred, is singular or plural. These stems may be related to each other; the stems may start the same but have different endings, or one may be a suffixed version of the other, or they may bear no resemblance and likely be suppletive, such as kale "throw (one)" vs namo "throw (multiple)".

==== Verb morphology ====
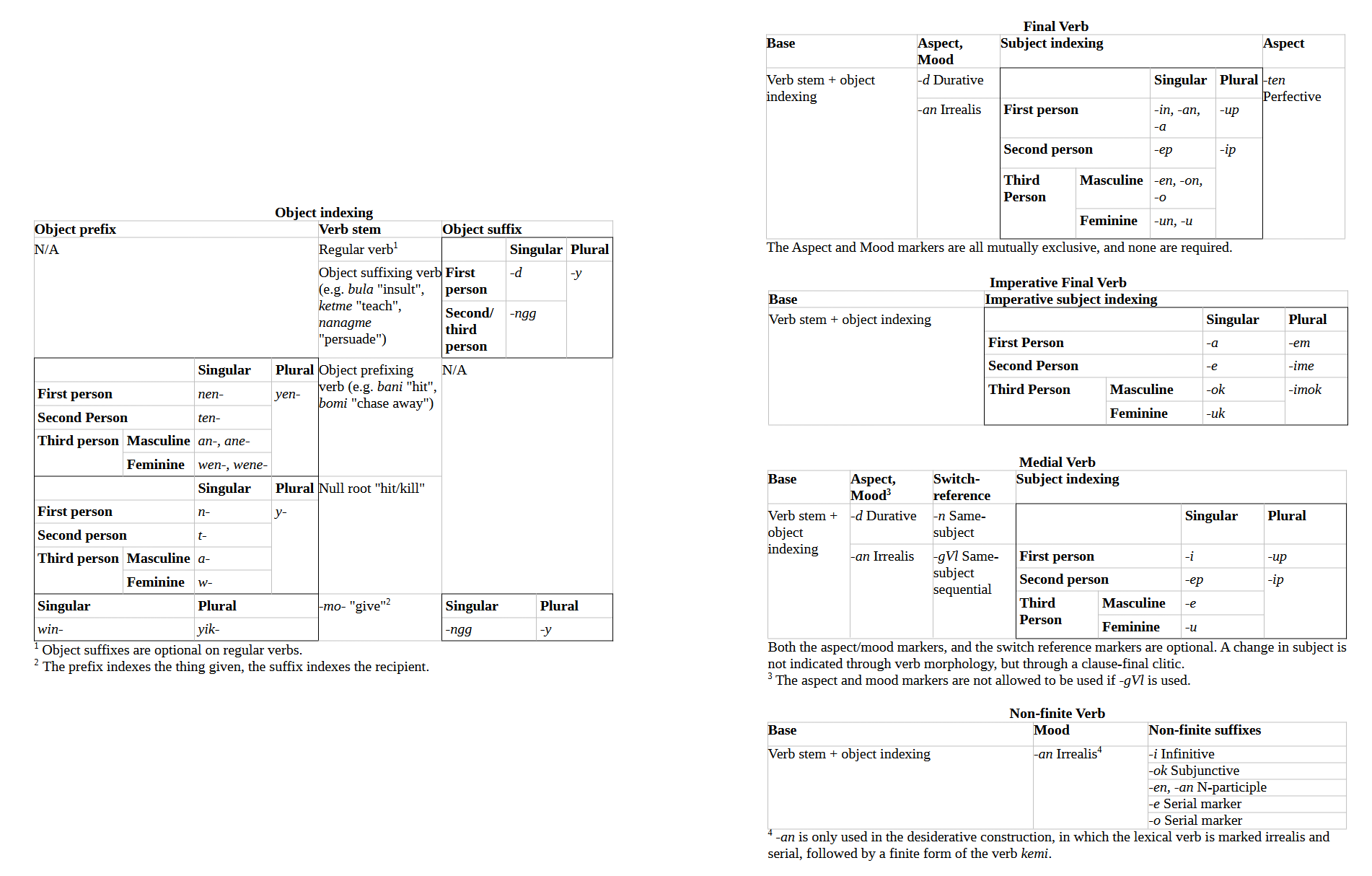
A chart showing Muyu verb morphology, on the left it displays the system of object indexing, and on the right, possible sets of suffixes that come after that.

Regular verbs have a vowel at the end of their stem, either o, e, or a, which is dropped when combining with certain suffixes, though there are irregular verb stems which never lose their final vowel, those in which the vowel of the stem harmonises with a following suffix, and those which display a final -n or -bVl with a harmonising vowel in some forms but not others.

Verbs come in three main inflectional patterns based on their clausal position. Final verbs have access to the full range of Aspect and Mood morphology, and person/number/gender indexing morphemes. Medial verbs occur in non-final clauses of a clause chain, take a distinct set of indexing morphemes, have limited possibilities for Aspect and Mood inflection, and take switch-reference markers. Both final and medial verbs are finite. Non-finite verbs are unable to index subjects, or be marked for switch-reference; they occur with a Mood marker in just a single construction.

===== Participant indexing =====
Subject indexing is obligatory on finite verbs, with final, medial, and imperative verbs all taking distinct subject affixes. All three persons are distinguished in the singular, with the third person also making a masculine/feminine distinction (though inanimate subjects often occur with the third person singular masculine form), while in the plural, only first versus non-first person is distinguished. In the imperative however, all three persons are distinguished in the plural.

Object indexing is obligatory on a small number of irregular verbs, some take prefixes (the only prefixes found on verbs), others suffixes. Both sets of object indexing morphemes have only a single form for all plural objects; the prefixes make a 3-way person distinction in the singular, with gender distinguished in the third person, while the suffixes only distinguish between first and non-first person in the singular. The object suffixes, unlike the object prefixes may occur on other transitive verbs rarely, sometimes indexing the expected object, sometimes a beneficiary. Two verbs have more divergent behaviour, there is a verb meaning "hit/kill" which has no stem: truncated variants of the object prefixes are simply directly followed by verbal suffixes. The other, -mo- "give", takes both an object prefix, indexing the item given, and an object suffix, indexing the recipient. These object markers distinguish number only. There is also a verb, kombi, which is ambitransitive, either taking an object prefix meaning "hit/kill", or an intransitive verb meaning "fall", which, unlike other verbs, indexes its subject with the prefixes otherwise used for objects, while the subject suffix is frozen in the third-person singular masculine form.

===== Aspect and Modality =====
Aspect and mood markers appear in multiple slots in the verb, and are all mutually exclusive; they cannot cooccur. The durative -d, and the irrealis -an occur between following object suffixes, if present, and before subject or switch-reference suffixes. The durative marks an event as ongoing at the time of speech or relative to some other event. The irrealis is used in a variety of situations, all united in referring to things that are not "real" at the present. This includes possible, future, and habitual events, and it's also used in expressing desired and prohibited events, either in combination with an auxiliary kemi, or with a prohibitive anggayom, respectively. A verb with the non-finite serial marker -e is marked for the irrealis in the Desiderative construction, accompanied by an auxiliary verb. This is the only situation in which a non-finite verb can take Aspect or Mood morphology. The Perfective -ten is the final suffix which can attach to a verb, though it may only attach to verbs with an e stem vowel, and cannot attach to verbs marked for switch-reference. It marks an event as complete, though a verb without an aspect marker may also be interpreted this way. Aspect and mood may also be expressed through periphrastic constructions where a non-finite verb is followed by a finite auxiliary.

===== Medial and non-finite morphology =====
Medial verbs are marked for switch-reference before the subject index by either -n Same-subject or -gVl (with a harmonising vowel) Same-subject sequential. The lack of either on a medial verb indicates the next verb has a different subject, in combination with a clause final different-subject clitic.

Non-finite forms include the serial markers -e and -o, which mark all verbs but the last in multi-verb constructions, though -e is by far more frequent; the infinitive, formed with -i, which functions as a verbal noun; the subjunctive, formed by -ok, which is used in both purpose clauses, and negated main clauses which aren't irrealis; and the N-participle -en/an, which is either used along with auxiliary wini "go" to form the inchoative, or followed by the adverbial clitic =mo to derive an adverb.

==== Complex Predicates ====
===== Light-verb constructions =====
Light-verb constructions are built from a verb, allowing the construction to function as a verbal predicate, and a noun or adjective, which carries much of the meaning of the construction. The precise meaning of a given example is not predictable; umkan wai (lit. blood do) "bleed" was mentioned earlier, but others include konoduk moni (lit. toetip ???) "stumble", and olok tani (lit. longing die) "miss". Most of the verbs used in these constructions have functions outside of them, but two, moni and wai, do not. This pair may alternate for a change in meaning, moni used for a single event viewed in whole, and wai for multiple events or an event spread over time, though for some other non-verbal elements, the use of wai is fixed and doesn't carry aspectual meaning. This same aspectual contrast is seen in light-verb constructions expressing motion using the verbs wini "go", and bomi "walk, respectively. Another pair, this time with a verbal number contrast, though only found in transitive light verb constructions, is kombi "put (one)", and yali "put (multiple)". The noun/adjective and verb form a single unit, rather than the non-verbal element being an argument of the verb, though an adverb may intervene between them. While the non-verbal element always carries most of the semantics, there are patterns of meanings in the light verbs; for example, tani "die" is used in light verb constructions expressing some kind of negative experience.

===== Auxiliary verb constructions =====
Auxiliary verb constructions appear similar to multi-verb constructions, though the initial verb may take non-finite forms other than just the serial markers -e, -o, and the finite verb conveys solely aspectual or mood information. The initial verb carries the lexical meaning of the predicate. The auxiliary verb kemi is used in two different constructions. If the lexical verb takes the serial marker, or the infinitive marker -i followed by the clitic =mo, the meaning is habitual, but if the lexical verb takes the irrealis -an, then the serial marker, the meaning is desiderative. This is the only circumstance where a non-finite verb can take a suffix of aspect or mood. Serial marking on the lexical verb also appears with the "keep/continue" auxiliary bini, while it receives the N-participle -en/-an with auxiliary wini "go", to mean "start VERBing".

===== Multi-verb constructions =====
Multi-verb constructions are made up of multiple verbs, all but the last receiving one of the serial markers -e or -o. They function together as a predicate within a single clause, and must share a subject, though they don't always share objects, and can be separated by intervening arguments, clitics, or coordinators, one example being a noun marked with =bet after a serial marked verb is interpreted as the goal of motion. They can be distinguished from auxiliary verb constructions, in that any verb may be involved, and they retain much of their lexical meaning, while in an auxiliary construction, the last verb only carries grammatical meaning, and is restricted to a few options. Multi-verb constructions are very similar in function to what are often called serial verb constructions in other languages, but they don't fit the criteria due to the serial markers, while a canonical serial verb construction has no explicit marker on the verbs involved.

Their functions are diverse, and correspond to various different structures in English, from single verbs, to the use of adverbs, or even multiple clauses. For example, concepts like bringing or taking away are expressed with a multi-verb construction: a verb like kani/bi "take (one/multiple), or nini "hold (one)" followed by a verb of motion, like mini "come", or kabani "run". The use of kani/bi as the first verb in a construction is also seen with verbs like kali/nami "throw one/many", or ka- "give" as the last. Verbs of motion may also be used to add motion semantics to a predicate; wini "go" preceding another verb results in the meaning "go and VERB/go to VERB", while when following a verb, the construction means "go (while) VERBing". There are demonstrative verbs ekuni, okuni " (do) like this, like that", which may occur alone, but are also frequently serial marked and followed by another verb in a multi-verb construction. There are also those with a final verb marking completion, like koli "stop". Some appear to be lexicalised, with the meaning unpredictable from the component verbs, such as be kani (lit. take (multiple) take (one)) "collect", or toke tebi (lit. slide down, move) "become full", while others contain a verb not found alone, like wane wini (lit. ??? go) "fly". While there are these various specific types, in theory, any verbs can be combined into a multi-verb construction, which will take a more general meaning, indicating both verbs are seen as parts of a single complex event, either simultaneously or in sequence.

=== Clause structure ===
Clausal arguments are often dropped if clear from context. In fact, clauses with two or more overt arguments are uncommon in natural speech. The typical order for an intransitive clause is for the subject to precede the verb, while the typical order is Agent, Object, Verb in a transitive clause.

A locational argument of a motion verb will come between a directional word, a distinct word class used in this construction, and the motion verb. If the location is unmarked, it is the goal of the movement, but if marked with the multifunctional Oblique clitic =bet, it is the source. This is unlike the function of =bet within multi-verb construction, where it does mark goal.

Reflexive forms of the personal pronouns, formed with a -ka suffix, are used to form reflexive clauses, though they may also be used for emphasis. Reciprocity is expressed in a construction where the verb expressing the reciprocal action is stated twice, each verb indexing one of the participants as subject, then followed by the auxiliary kemi which indexes both participants as subject.

The clitic =ko is used frequently; its meaning is vague, but it attaches to full constituents rather than midway through a phrase, and signals that the speaker has more they want to say.

==== Non-verbal clauses ====
Non-verbal clauses are commonly expressed through juxtaposition of the subject and predicate, or with the copula clitic =an attached to the predicate, though the verb keli "become" may also be used, often to allow aspect or mood marking. These clauses are used for expressing identity with a noun as predicate; attribution with an adjective; possession where the possessed noun is the predicate, quantity with a quantifier or numeral; similarity or purpose using a noun marked by the postposition adep "like", or yeman "for", respectively. These postpositions may also follow a verb marked with the infinitive -i, indicating similarity to an event, or that an event is a goal. A noun marked by the Oblique clitic =bet may be the predicate, with the same diverse set of functions it displays when not the predicate. The existential particles aip and yanop follow a referent whose existence is predicated, optionally followed by either of the copula elements. Possession can be predicated either with a possessed noun being expressed in an existential clause, or an identificational one, equivalent to "there is my brother", and "he is my brother", respectively. There are also demonstrative copulas eyen, oyen, built from the demonstrative roots and the copula clitic. They either take no free subject, or the demonstrative pronouns edo/odo as subject.

==== Non-declarative clauses ====
Polar questions can be marked by a final clitic =e, the clitic =ko, or the particle nea (ko), which may also form disjunctive questions. The clitics =e and =ko may also occur on content questions, which require the use of a content interrogative word. There are three roots with this function, medep, kanema, kede "what, who, where", which remain in situ, rather than being fronted like in English. They can be combined with postpositions and conjunctions to produce questions with other meanings (e.g. kedep adep lit. "where like", meaning "why").

Imperative clauses are marked by a distinct set of subject suffixes on the final verb. The exact meaning of an imperative verb differs depending on the subject. With a second person subject, they are commands. With a first person plural subject, they are hortatives, while with a first person singular subject, they may express desires, often in quoted speech. The subject of the speech may be non-first person, such that "He wants to go" might be expressed with the quoting verb in the third person, and the verb go as a quote in the first person singular. Third person imperatives may express what the speaker desires that third person do, or express that the addressee should allow the third person to perform the action.

==== Negation ====
Clauses are negated by a final particle balin. If the clause is verbal, the final verb must either be in the Irrealis mood, for negative future, potential, or habitual events, or appear in the Subjunctive non-finite form. The particle balin is also used to negate non-verbal clauses, but it cannot be used alongside the copula =an. the particle balin follows an infinitive verb to express a prohibited action (though an irrealis verb plus anggayom may also express this), or there may be a sequence of an infinitive verb, the postposition adep, and balin, to express lack of ability. The indefinite pronouns nowan may also be used as a negator. It may express non-existence of a referent, occurring as the predicate of a non-verbal clause, or it may be followed by the verb keli "become", to indicate that the referent will disappear. It may also stand alone, with various possible meanings determined by context, including "there was nothing", or "nothing happened".

=== Clause combining ===
==== Medial clauses ====
Muyu verbs can take medial forms, which are finite verbs which host a distinct set of subject-indexing suffixes, take switch-reference markers, and are followed by a final verb in a different clause. Switch reference marking is not solely found in verbal morphology however; a medial verb can take a switch-reference clitic instead of or in addition to a suffix. Multiple medial clauses can appear in a row, in each, the switch reference marking is controlled by its relationship to the following clause, not the final clause, though occasionally, a following medial clause may be ignored if it expresses background information. If the clause following a medial clause has the same subject, the medial verb will take either -n, or -gVl as a suffix; the latter specifies that the event in the next clause happens after the one it marks, while the former does not; the events may either happen at once, or in sequence. Adding the clitic =ket to the medial verb also marks same subject-sequentiality, and it may occur with either switch reference suffix. If the subject of the clause following the medial clause is different, the verb won't take a switch reference suffix, instead it will take either the different-subject sequential clitic =e, or =kot, which unlike =e may also occur independently to join clauses, without switch reference function.

A verb marked by either the same-subject suffix -n, or the different-subject clitic=e may take the Durative aspect suffix, then indicating the events overlapped, overriding =e's default interpretation of sequentiality. The perfective aspect suffix is not allowed on medial verbs, but the irrealis mood suffix is, though only in different subject clauses; same subject medial clauses are not marked for irrealis when the final clause is. Clauses with a medial verb cannot be negated, negation with balin in the final clause negates only that clause and not any preceding medial clauses.

==== Clause coordination ====
Clauses may be coordinated through juxtaposition, through the particle ta "and", and onet "but" appearing between them, and the clitic =ko may also attach to the first clause for this purpose.

==== Adverbial clauses ====
Adverbial conjunctions come at the end of the adverbial clause they mark, which takes a final verb. Conditional clauses are marked by either kanet, used for conditions which are likely or expected to occur, while kaden marks those which are counterfactual or seen as unlikely. Cause is marked with kole "because". Demonstratives are also used in the same position for clause linking, locational demonstratives placed finally make a clause referring to the location of an event, while oblique marked demonstratives refer to when the event happened. Purpose can be marked by the postposition yeman "for" following an infinitive marked verb, or through a verb marked with the subjunctive suffix.

==== Relative clauses ====
Relative clauses may come before or after the head noun. If before, the third-person singular masculine pronoun ye separates them, while if it comes after, it is marked with a final demonstrative. The head noun is attested as the subject, object, and possessor within a relative clause. Relative clauses may also have no head noun, these always take a final demonstrative, and often correspond to English structure like "the one that...]" or "the fact that...]"

==== Quoted clauses ====
A clitic =o marks quoted speech; if multiple clauses are quoted, it may occur on each, or just on the last one. The clause or sequence of quoted clauses is then followed by the speech verb enggi, though it may sometimes precede the quote. enggi often occurs with a serial marker in a multi-verb construction, followed by a more specific verb like monkani "report" or even okoni "think", to refer to what someone thought. Another situation in which the quotative construction is not used for what someone literally said, is when the verb of the quoted clause is in the first-person singular imperative form, which is used to express the desire of the subject of the speech verb. Quotes are generally direct; pronominals and demonstratives will take the forms the original speaker would have used, though this may not be the case for object indexing.

=== Example sentences ===
This sentence demonstrates a postnominal relative clause wangga menen ogo "who is coming there", marked with a final demonstrative and a multi-verb construction with serial marked wene "go (and)", and final imperative marked teme "(you) see".

Ogo kep, anggotmi wangga men-en ogo wen-e tem-e
DEM 2SG friend there come-3SG.M DEM go-SM see-2SG.IMP
"You there, go and see the friend who is coming there."

There are two medial verbs here. The first, bodobone, is marked for different subject with a final clitic, while the latter, yumunene, is marked for same subject with a suffix preceding the person marker. This also shows the verb stem nombel- "(many) fall", which is plural, having the corresponding singular stem kok- "(one) fall". Despite the verb stem marking plurality, the subject-indexing suffix is in the third-person singular masculine form, which is standard for inanimate subjects.

Bodob-on=e wen-e wen-e kelega-un=go wen-e yumune-n-e, nombel-en
bear.fruit-3SG.M=DS.SEQ go-SM go-SM watch-3SG.F=PTC go-SM become.ripe-SS-3SG.M fall:PL.SBJ-3SG.M
"It bore fruit so she waited until they were ripe and fell down."

This example has two multi-verb constructions, the first terminating in a medial verb marked for same subject, and the latter terminating in a final verb. The oblique marked noun apbet, within the first multi-verb construction, references the goal. The second illustrates a caused motion multi-verb construction, with both verbs taking their singular stem form. Then the final clause is negated, which triggers the use of the non-finite subjunctive suffix on the verb.

Jadi wen-e ap=bet kawen-e alo-n-i kedo adutbop kan-e kal-an, teb-ok balin.
so(IL) go-SM tree=OBL climb-SM stand-SS-1SG then rotten.wood take:SG.OBJ-SM throw:SG.OBJ-1SG, wake.up-SBJV NEG
"So I climbed a tree and stood on it, and threw a piece of rotten wood(at the pig), but it did not wake up."

The first person possessor directly precedes the possessum without an explicit marker. The content interrogative word appears in-situ, and the verb is marked for perfective aspect.

Kep=ko medepkot ne aninggo kabademn-ep-ten?
2SG.M=PTC why 1.SG name forget-2SG.PFV
"Why did you forget my name?"

Nimi- is an object indexing verb, here it is inflected with the first person singular object suffix, the durative aspect, and the second or third person plural subject suffix. The particle/clitic ko is used twice, in its latter use it helps mark the sentence as a question.

Kip ko (ne) nimi-d-o-d-ip ko?
2PL PTC (1SG) hate-1SG.OBJ-EP-DUR-2/3PL QST
"Do you hate me?"

The light verb construction ok tan-, literally "water die", means "be hit by floods". It is marked irrealis, which combined with the final negator, marks a lack of possibility. The subjunctive form of the verb is not used if it is marked irrealis.

Nup ambip=ko ok tan-an-un balin.
1PL house=PTC water die.LV-IRR-3SG.F NEG.
"Our area cannot be hit by floods."

Both clauses here use the habitual auxiliary construction, in which the lexical verb takes the serial marker, and is followed by a finite form of the verb kem- "do".

Om alum-e kem-ep=ko wedambel-e kem-in.
sago chop.sago-SM do-2SG=PTC hear-SM do-1SG
"I usually hear it when you make sago."

Gole marks the preceding discourse as the cause of the following clause. The first clause chain uses a medial same-subject marked verb, then a final light verb construction. The stem wa- is never used as a verb outside of light verb constructions. The second clause displays the variant form =to of the particle =ko, found in souther varieties.

Kedo-n-u adut wa-un gole, om=to yal-e kol-on.
turn.to-SS-3SG.F prohibition LV-3SG.F CONJ, sago=PTC lay.down:PL.OBJ-SM leave-3SG.M
"Since she turned to him and she forbade (him to eat it), he left the sago"

Here, a quoted speech construction is used to express desire. "Ombet teka", enggon literally means "He said, let me pull with it.", but it may indicate the subject's desire rather than something they said.

"Ombet tek-a”, engg-on kole.
OBL.DEM pull-1SG.IMP say-3SG.M CONJ
"Because he wanted to pull (the car) with it."

There are two verbless clauses here, the first is existential, the latter uses the copula with an adjectival predicate. They are linked with a conjunction.

Tit yanop onet beng~beng=an
product there.is but small~RED=COP
"There will be some products but they are small."

== Bibliography ==
- Zahrer, Alexander (23 Jun 2023). A Grammar of Muyu: A Lowland Ok language of Western New Guinea (Thesis).
- Zahrer, Alexander (2025a). A grammar of Muyu. University of Münster. p. 753. doi:10.17879/33908461355.
- Zahrer A (2025b). Children of the sago: Muyu texts (pdf). Berlin: Language Science Press. doi:10.5281/zenodo.15781820. ISBN 9783961105328.
