= Kovojab language =

Papuan language

Kovojab
- Kovojap, Kvolyab, Kopoyap
- Region: Papua Province, Indonesia
- Language family: Bayono–Awbono: Kovojab

Language codes
- ISO 639-3: None (mis)
- Glottolog: None

Kovojab (Kovojap, Kvolyab, Kopoyap) is a Bayono–Awbono language spoken in the highlands of Papua Province, Indonesia.

All that is known of Kovojab is a few hundred words recorded in Wilbrink (2004). The Kovojab word list in Wilbrink (2004) was originally recorded by Peter Jan de Vries.

== Names ==
Ethnologue gives the name Kvolyab as an alternative name for Awbono. However, Glottolog classifies Kovojab with Bayono rather than with Awbono.

The name Kopoyap is given by Hischier (2006).
