= Bayono–Awbono languages =

Awyu–Ok language spoken in Indonesia

Bayono–Awbono
- Geographic distribution: Papua Province, Indonesia
- Linguistic classification: Trans–New Guinea: Central West New Guinea; Awyu–Ok; Greater Awyu; Becking–Dawi; Bayono–Awbono
- Subdivisions: Bayono; Awbono; Densar; Kovojab

Language codes
- Glottolog: bayo1259

Bayono–Awbono is a Papuan language cluster spoken in Papua Province, Indonesia, to the south of the Somahai languages. All that is known of them is a few hundred words recorded in first-contact situations recorded in Wilbrink (2004) and Hischier (2006).

== Languages ==
Wilbrink (2004) lists 4 distinct language varieties.

- Bayono (Enamesi, Swesu), Kovojab (Kvolyab, Kopoyap)
- Awbono, Densar

== Classification ==
Noting insufficient evidence, Pawley and Hammarström (2018) leave Bayono–Awbono as unclassified rather than as part of Trans-New Guinea. However, according to Dryer (2022), based on a preliminary quantitative analysis of data from the ASJP database, Bayono–Awbono is likely to be a subgroup of Trans–New Guinea.

Timothy Usher finds enough evidence to classify Awbono–Bayono within the Greater Awyu (Digul River) family.

Wilbrink (2004) notes limited similarity with the neighboring Ok languages, and does not classify Bayono–Awbono with Ok.

== Pronouns ==
The pronouns demonstrate resemblances to the neighboring Ok and Greater Awyu languages, and the pronouns are consistent with Bayono-Awbono belonging to the Trans–New Guinea family:

Lect	1SG	2SG
Awbono	nɛ	ɡu
Bayono	ne	ɡwe
proto-Awyu–Dumut	*nu-p	*gu-p
proto-Ok	*na-	*ka-b-/*ku-b-
proto-TNG	*na	*ga
