= Urapmin =

Urapmin may refer to:

- Urapmin people
- Urapmin language
