= Awyu–Ok languages =

Language group in central New Guinea

Awyu–Ok
- Digul River – Ok
- Geographic distribution: central New Guinea
- Linguistic classification: Trans–New Guinea: Central West New Guinea; Awyu–Ok
- Proto-language: Proto-Awyu–Ok
- Subdivisions: Digul River (Greater Awyu); Kamula–Elevala; Ok

Language codes
- Glottolog: awyu1265

The Awyu–Ok languages are a group of Trans–New Guinea families in central New Guinea established by Timothy Usher, though with precedents in earlier studies.

== Languages ==
The three language families in Awyu–Ok are as follows:

- Digul River (Greater Awyu)
- Kamula–Elevala
- Ok

The Oksapmin language is sometimes classified as the nearest relative of Ok. However, it's unclear whether the similarities are due to relationship or to contact between Oksapmin and Mountain Ok (or both).

== Reconstruction ==
Proto-Awyu–Ok
- Reconstruction of: Awyu–Ok languages
- Reconstructed ancestor: Proto-Trans–New Guinea
- Lower-order reconstructions: Proto-Digul River; Proto-Kamula–Elevala; Proto-Ok

=== Phonemes ===
Usher (2020) reconstructs the consonant inventory as follows:

		Bilabial	Alveolar	Palatal	Velar	
		Bilabial	Alveolar	Palatal	plain	labialized
Nasal		*m	*n			
Plosive	plain	*p	*t		*k	*kʷ
Plosive	prenasalized	*ᵐb	*ⁿd	*ⁿdz	*ᵑɡ	*ᵑɡʷ
Fricative			*s			
Semivowel		*w		*j		
Rhotic			*ɾ			

=== Pronouns ===
Usher (2020) reconstructs the pronouns as:

	sg	pl
1excl	*ne	*nu
1incl	*ne	*nup
2m	*ŋgep	*ŋgip
2f	*ŋgup	*ŋgip
3m	*eː	*i
3f	*u	*i

The third-person pronouns are an innovation shared with the neighboring branch of Trans–New Guinea, Anim. The Awyu–Ok second-person pronouns show the same vowel ablaut for gender as well.

=== Basic vocabulary ===
Some lexical reconstructions of Proto-Digul River-Ok, Proto-Digul River, and Proto-Ok by Usher (2020) are:

gloss	Proto-Digul River-Ok	Proto-Digul River	Proto-Ok
eye	*kiːn(-roːp)	*kin-rop	*kiːn(-roːp)
mouth/tooth	*maŋgoːt	*maŋgot	*maŋgoːt
tongue	*poːŋg	*pon-kat	*poːŋg
blood/men's house	*kaim	*kaim	*kaim
bone	*kundoːR	*kundor	*kundoːR
skin/bark	*kaːnd	*ka[ː]t	*kaːnd
breast	*[aː/oː]m; *noːn	*[a/o]m; *non	
dog	*majaːn; *t[i/eː]nd	*m[a]jan; *t[i/e]t	*majaːn; *tind
egg	*w[ai]ndin	*w[ai]ndin	*windin
sun/day	*[a]taːp	*[a]ta[ː]p	*[a]taːp
moon	*wakoːr	*wakor	*wakoːr
water	*[aː/oː]k	*[a/o][ː]k	*oːk
