= Iworo =

Iworo may refer to:

- Iwur language or Morop, one of the Ok languages of West Papua
- Mountain Koiali language, a language of Papua New Guinea, not very close to similarly named Grass Koiari

== See also ==
- Internal Western Outlands Revolutionary Organization
