= Burumakok language =

Language

Burumakok
- Burupmakot
- Native to: Indonesia
- Region: Highland Papua
- Native speakers: (40 cited 1994)
- Language family: Trans–New Guinea: Central & South New Guinea ?; Ok; Western; Burumakok

Language codes
- ISO 639-3: aip
- Glottolog: buru1307
- ELP: Burumakok

Burupmakot is a minor Ok language of Highland Papua. Despite having just forty speakers, there is limited bilingualism and the language is not considered endangered.

It is spoken in Burupmakot village, Seradala District, Yahukimo Regency.
