= Kamula–Elevala languages =

Family of Trans–New Guinea languages

Kamula–Elevala
- Kamula–Elevala River
- Geographic distribution: northern Western Province, Papua New Guinea
- Native speakers: c. 28,700 (2000)
- Linguistic classification: Trans–New Guinea: Central West New Guinea; Awyu–Ok; Kamula–Elevala
- Proto-language: Proto-Kamula–Elevala
- Subdivisions: Awin–Pa (Awin–Pare); Kamula

Language codes
- Glottolog: kamu1264
- The Awin–Pa–Kamula languages of New Guinea The Awin–Pa and Kamula languages Other Trans–New Guinea languages Other Papuan languages Austronesian languages Uninhabited

The Kamula–Elevala languages, also called the Kamula–Elevala River languages, are a small family of Papuan languages spoken in northern Western Province, Papua New Guinea, in the region of the Elevala River. The family has three languages: Kamula, and the more closely related Aekyom (Awin) and Pa (Pare), which together make up the Awin–Pa, or Elevala, subgroup. They had about 28,700 speakers in 2000.

The link between Kamula and the Awin–Pa languages was established by Edgar Suter and Timothy Usher (2017), who reconstructed Proto-Kamula–Elevala. Within the Trans–New Guinea family, Kamula–Elevala is placed in the Awyu–Ok branch.

== Languages ==
There are three languages, namely Aekyowm (Awin), Pare (Pa), and Kamula. They are not obviously related to each other, but Aekyowm and Pare are closer to each other than to Kamula.

- Kamula
- Awin–Pa (Elevala River)
  - Aekyowm (Awin)
  - Pare (Pa)

A more in-depth classification by Suter and Usher (2017) is as follows.

Kamula–Elevala family

- Kamula [1,100 speakers in 2000]
- Elevala (= Awin–Pare) family
  - Pa (= Pare, Ba, Debepare) [6,500 speakers in 2000]
  - Aekyom (= Awin, Akium) [21,100 speakers in 2000]
    - Northeastern (= Aekyom–Skai)
    - North Central
    - Southeastern (= Aekyom–Pare)
    - Western

== Classification ==
Stephen Wurm (1975) added Awin and Pa to an expanded Central and South New Guinea branch of TNG, a position reversed by Ross (2005). The connection between Awin–Pa and Kamula was established by Suter & Usher. Timothy Usher's New Guinea World places the family within the Awyu–Ok branch of Trans–New Guinea.

== Reconstruction ==
Proto-Kamula–Elevala
- Reconstruction of: Kamula–Elevala languages
- Reconstructed ancestors: Proto-Trans–New Guinea: Proto-Awyu–Ok

=== Phonology ===
Usher (2020) reconstructs the consonant and vowel inventories as follows:

Proto-Kamula–Elevala consonants
		Bilabial	Alveolar	Palatal	Velar
Nasal		*m	*n		
Plosive	voiceless	*p (or *h)	*t		*k
Plosive	voiced	*b (or *p)	*d		*g
Fricative			*s		
Semivowel		*w		*j	

Proto-Kamula–Elevala vowels
	Front	Central	Back
Close	*i		*u
Close-mid	*e		*o
Open-mid			*ɔ
Open	*æ	*a	

There is also the diphthong *ai.

=== Pronouns ===
Usher (2020) reconstructs the Awin–Pa pronouns as:

Awin–Pa pronouns
	sg	du	pl
1	*nɔ	*ni, *ki	
2	*go	*gi	
3	*jɔ		

In the 1du, Awin has /ki/ and Pare /ni/, /niki/, /nigi/. The Kamula singular forms are quite similar (na, wa, je), but it does not have the dual.

=== Vocabulary ===
Some Proto-Kamula–Elevala lexical reconstructions by Usher (2020) are:

Proto-Kamula–Elevala basic vocabulary (Usher)
gloss	Proto-Kamula–Elevala
head	*ke̝ba
ear	*m[ɔ/o̝]d[ɔ/o̝]
eye	*kinɔ
nose	*kine̝
tusk/tooth	*bate̝
tongue/flame	*taⁱ
knee/leg	*tama
bone	*ke̝dɔ
louse	*awV
dog	*ti
pig	*m₂aⁱnæ
bird	*te̝ja
egg/fruit/seed	*m[ɔ/o̝]k[ɔ/o̝]
tree	*je̝
man	*k[ɔ/o̝]b[a/ɔ]
sun/day	*gani
stone	*ike̝
name	*pi
eat/drink	*de̝-
one	*tV[n/d]o̝

Below are all of the lexical reconstructions of Proto-Kamula–Elevala from Suter and Usher (2017):

Proto-Kamula–Elevala reconstructions (Suter & Usher)
gloss	Proto-Kamula–Elevala
house	*aja
mushroom	*ap(ɔ,o)
hear	*dade-
where?	*dai
sago	*daja
eat, drink	*de-
burn, cook	*du-
middle	*dunu
brother	*ei
sun, day	*gani
belly, bowels	*gene
leech	*gimada
hold	*hamV-
upright	*hane
name	*hi
light (in weight)	*hodoka
stand, stay	*hV-
sago thatch	*jeme
hit	*jV-
bone	*kedɔ
man	*kopo
now, today	*kwa-
thigh	*madina
shoulder	*makæ
know	*maN(æ,a)-
teeth, mouth	*mat(e,i)
kindle	*mi-
son, child	*mi
body	*mot(e,i)
joint	*mu
tusk	*patæ
skin disease	*peseni
die	*po-
tie, wrap	*podi
pierce, burst	*poko-
heart, pity	*pɔdɔw(e,a)
be soft	*pɔpɔtæ-
close eyes	*pudi-
sit	*pV-
speech	*sa
rafter	*saka
paddle	*sode
tongue	*tai
afternoon	*tamide
make, do	*ti-
embers	*tine
bow (for arrows)	*tɔ
upstream	*t(ɔ,o)t(ɔ,o)
thorn	*tu
banana	*tuma
go	*tV-
one	*tVdo
illicit	*u
scar	*ud(e,i)
urine	*ute
grub	*wæja
left (hand)	*weke

=== Proto-Elevala ===
Proto-Elevala reconstructions from Suter and Usher (2017):

Proto-Elevala reconstructions
gloss	Proto-Elevala
hand, arm	*a
lie down	*æ-
sand	*daNi
give	*dæ-
flea	*dideme
meat	*dinæ
testicles	*dipɔ
crocodile	*dope
sap, juice	*dɔdæ
fingernail	*d(ɔ,a)kæ
see	*dV-
sugarcane	*ga
beak	*ga
sing	*gi-
gums	*gine
younger brother	*gɔmɔde
cut	*gu
stick	*gum(ɔ,a)
count	*hiakV-
breath	*hine
do, make	*hɔmV-
carry on head	*i-
stone	*ike
song	*jɔkæ
set on fire	*kamV-
leg	*kate
beetle	*kiame
thunder	*kima(ti)
nose	*kine
face	*kiNɔ-namæ58
white	*kɔnV-kaina59
coconut	*kɔpɔkæ
pig	*mainæ
head	*mini
below	*moka
fish	*mone
stem	*moNæ
what?	*na
cane mail shirt	*napo
charcoal	*o
drum	*pi
heavy	*piena
buttocks	*po
smell	*pɔmæ
bride price	*puNe
goanna	*sɔNɔmæ
yesterday	*te
sago thatch	*temæ
rattan	*tike
ground, earth	*tɔ
wild	*tɔna

== Vocabulary comparison ==
The following basic vocabulary words are from McElhanon & Voorhoeve (1970), Shaw (1973), and Shaw (1986), as cited in the Trans-New Guinea database.

The words cited constitute translation equivalents, whether they are cognate (e.g. kɔ, kro for 'bone') or not (e.g. mɔgɔ, kɛndɔkɛ for 'ear'). Notice the very low number of cognate pairs between the two languages.

Pare and Aekyom basic vocabulary
gloss	Pare	Aekyom
head	keba; kiba	pɔƀe
hair	osɛ; ouse	tɛnɛ
ear	mogamɛ; mogo; mɔgɔ	kɛndɔkɛ
eye	kere-mo; kinemo; kinemɔ	krO-ŋɛ
nose	kene; kine	koe
tooth	male; marɛ; pɛrɛ	pʰɛtɛ
tongue	tɛ	tiː
leg	tamakali	
louse	kiba ʔo; kiba ʔɔ; ɔ	huɔlɛ
dog	ti; til	psane
pig	mele	
bird	tie; tiye	
egg	moʔo; mɔʔɔ	
blood	sowo; sɔwɔ	
bone	ko; kɔ	kro
skin	sia; siga; siya	kare
breast	bu	tutɛ
tree	i̧; ĩ	de; doe
man	kobo	
woman	wigi	
sun	gẽnɛ̃; gine	toe
moon	abi	
water	mɔa; omɛ; ɔmɔɛ; ume	waɛ
fire	ne; nɛ	de; doe
stone	iebɔ; iyebo	
road, path	utigi	tɛnɛ
name	hi	hi
eat	da; denu; de-nu	də
one	oteso; ɔtesɔ	
two	diyabo; diyabɔ	
String Bag	dissa; disaɔ	

== Evolution ==
Proposed Awin–Pa reflexes of proto-Trans-New Guinea (pTNG) etyma:

Aekyom language:

- kendoke 'ear' < *kand(e,i)k[V]
- khatike 'leg' < *k(a,o)
- ndok[V], kare 'skin' < *(ŋg,k)a(nd,t)apu
- di 'firewood, fire' < *inda

Pa language:

- keba 'head' < *kV(mb,p)(i,u)tu
- ama 'mother < *am(a,i)
- di- 'burn' < *nj(a,e,i)

== Loanwords ==
=== Kamula and Doso ===
Loanwords between Kamula and Doso:

Kamula–Doso loanwords
No.	Kamula	Doso	Turumsa
1	'father'	[a:] 'father'	[a:] 'father'
2	'mother'	['wai] 'mother'	['wai] 'mother'
3	'older brother'	['bapa] 'older brother'	
4	'older sister'	['nana] 'older sister'	
5	'blood'	['omari] 'blood'	
6	'stomach'		[kù'ko] 'belly (outside)'
7	'wallaby'	[ka'pia] 'wallaby'	[kapia] 'wallaby'
8	'cassowary'	[wa:taɾa] 'cassowary'	[wa:taɾa] 'cassowary'
9	'cloud'	['waɾa] 'cloud'	
10	'sand'	['asiɾa] 'sand'	

=== Aekyom and Ok ===
Aekyom loanwords from Ok languages:

Aekyom loanwords from Ok
No.	Aekyom	Mountain Ok	Lowland Ok
1	[mon] 'rubbish'	*mɔːn 'rubbish, compost'	
2	[ɺoŋ] 'garden newly felled'	*ɾaŋg 'garden'	*joŋg 'garden'
3	[khno] 'canoe'		*kono 'canoe'
4	[ambum(e)] 'turtle'	*ambɔːm 'turtle species'	*ambom 'turtle'
5	[khwiɺe] 'hornbill'	*kaweːɾ 'Papuan hornbill'	*kaweɾ 'hornbill'
6	[ubine] 'rhinoceros beetle'	*umiːn 'rhinoceros beetle'	
7	[mom] 'nephew, maternal'	*mɔːm 'mother's brother'	*mom 'mother's brother'
8	[ahwoe] 'grandmother'	*ap(e,o)ːk 'grandmother'	*apok 'grandmother'
9	[khendoke] 'outer ear'	*kindɔːŋg 'inner ear'	*kende 'ear'
10	[mgat-ɺam] 'in the mouth'	*maŋgat 'mouth, chin'	*maŋgot 'mouth'

=== Kamula and Aramia River ===
Kamula loanwords from Aramia River languages:

Kamula loanwords from Aramia River
No.	Kamula	Waruna	Gogodala
1	'taro'	[bibi] 'taro'	[bibi] 'taro'
2	'yam'		[waisa] 'yam'
3	'canoe'	[gwawa] 'canoe'	[gawa] 'canoe'
4	'paddle, oar'	[keari] 'paddle'	[keari] 'paddle'
5	'chicken'	[kakaba] 'fowl'	
6	'breadfruit'	[kawaki] 'breadfruit'	

=== Kamula–Elevala and Awyu–Dumut ===
Potential cognates between Kamula–Elevala and Awyu–Dumut (Healey 1970):

Abbreviations

- pAD = proto-Awyu–Dumut
- pA = proto-Awyu
- pD = proto-Dumut
- pKE = proto-Kamula–Elevala
- pK = proto-Kamula
- pE = proto-Elevala

Kamula–Elevala and Awyu–Dumut potential cognates
Awyu–Dumut (Healey 1970)	Kamula–Elevala
pAD *dat- 'hear'	pKE *dade- 'hear'
pAD *do- 'be cooked'	pKE *du- 'burn, cook'
pAD *ɛdex- 'give'	pE *dæ- 'give'
pAD *füp 'name'	pKE *hi 'name'
pAD *göp 'you (sg.)'	pE *go 'you (sg.)'
pAD *ket 'flower'	Pa [ke] 'blossom'
pAD *mak 'shoulder'	pKE *makæ 'shoulder'
pAD *nop 'I'	pE *nɔ 'I'
pAD *or 'excreta, intestines'	Kamula /o/ 'abdomen, belly'
pAD *xaiban 'head'	Pa [keba] 'head'
pAD *xop 'male, man'	pKE *kopo 'man'
pAD *yin 'tree, wood, fire'	Pa [ẽ] 'tree'
pA *bu 'buttocks'	pE *po 'buttocks'
pA *dübe, *dübi 'island'	Aekyom [dupi] 'island'
pA *düb(-ro) 'heart'	Kamula 'heart'
pA *makan, *mokan 'low, beneath'	pE *moka 'below'
pA *midi(n) 'thigh'	pKE *madina 'thigh'
pA *wün 'liver'	Pa [wumɛ] 'liver'
pA *xui(-to) 'sky'	Aekyom [khwoe] 'sky, heaven'
pD *ba- 'sit'	pKE *pV- 'sit'
pD *kumöt 'thunder'	pE *kima(ti) 'thunder'
