= Kopka language =

Ok language spoken in Indonesia

Kopkaka
- Native to: Indonesia
- Region: Highland Papua: Yahukimo Regency
- Native speakers: (500 cited 1998–2002)
- Language family: Trans–New Guinea: Central & South New Guinea ?; Ok; Western; Kopkaka
- Dialects: Tokuni; Marub; Kwer

Language codes
- ISO 639-3: Either: opk – Kopkaka kwr – Kwer
- Glottolog: kopk1238 Kopkaka kwer1265 Kwer
- ELP: Kopkaka
- Kwer

Kopkaka (Kopka) is an Ok language spoken in Seredala District, Yahukimo Regency, Highland Papua. The villages that speak this language are Seredala, Moruf, Mosomduba, Burupmakot, and others.
