= Ngalum language =

Language in Indonesia

Ngalum
- Sibil, Ngalum Weng
- Region: Highland Papua, Sandaun
- Ethnicity: Ngalum
- Native speakers: (20,000 cited 1981–1987)
- Language family: Trans–New Guinea: Central & South New Guinea ?; Ok; Ngalum languages; Ngalum

Language codes
- ISO 639-3: szb
- Glottolog: ngal1298
- ELP: Ngalum

Ngalum is the most populous of the Ok languages in Highland Papua and Papua New Guinea.

== Phonology ==
=== Consonants ===
		Labial	Alveolar	Palatal	Velar
Nasal		m	n		ŋ
Plosive	voiceless	p	t		k
Plosive	voiced	b	d		
Fricative			s		
Trill			r		
Lateral			l		
Approximant		w		j	

- /k/ can also be heard as [ɡ] in word-medial position.

=== Vowels ===
	Front	Central	Back
Close	i		u
Mid	e		o
Open		a	
