= Nakai language =

Ok language of Highland Papua, Indonesia

Nakai
- Native to: Indonesia
- Region: Highland Papua
- Native speakers: (700 cited 1999)
- Language family: Trans–New Guinea: Central & South New Guinea ?; Ok; Tangko–Nakai; Nakai

Language codes
- ISO 639-3: nkj
- Glottolog: naka1265
- ELP: Nakai

Nakai [na'ʁaj] is an Ok language of Highland Papua. Two of the three dialects, which pronounce the ethnonym Nagi, may be a distinct language.
