= Central West New Guinea languages =

Language group

Central West New Guinea
- Geographic distribution: central New Guinea
- Linguistic classification: Trans–New Guinea: Central West New Guinea
- Subdivisions: Awyu–Ok; Momuna–Mek

Language codes
- Glottolog: None
- Map: The Central West New Guinea languages The CWNG families Other Trans–New Guinea families Other Papuan languages Austronesian languages Uninhabited

The Central West New Guinea languages are a group of Trans–New Guinea families in central New Guinea established by Timothy Usher, though with precedents in earlier studies.

== Languages ==
The languages are as follows:

- Awyu–Ok
  - Digul River (Greater Awyu)
  - Kamula–Elevala
  - Ok
- Momuna–Mek
  - Mek
  - Momuna (Somahai)

Voorhoeve (1975) noted a connection between Somahai and the Ok and Dumut languages, but did not consider Mek. (See Central and South New Guinea languages.)

The Oksapmin language is sometimes classified as the nearest relative of Ok. However, it's unclear whether the similarities are due to relationship or to contact between Oksapmin and Mountain Ok (or both).

Proto-Anim is reconstructed with similar pronouns to Proto-Awyu–Ok.
