= NXR =

NXR or nxr may refer to:

- Postal code for Naxxar, Malta
- Nitrite oxidoreductase, an enzyme
- ISO 639-3 code for the Ninggerum language, an Ok language spoken in Indonesia and Papua New Guinea

== See also ==
- Reva NXR, an electric car model
