= Iwur language =

Ok language spoken in Indonesia

Iwur
- Murop
- Native to: Indonesia
- Region: Papua
- Native speakers: 6,900 (2011)
- Language family: Trans–New Guinea: Central & South New Guinea ?; Ok; Lowland Ok; Iwur
- Dialects: Dintere; Komanarepket

Language codes
- ISO 639-3: iwo
- Glottolog: iwur1240
- ELP: Iwur

Iwur or Murop is one of the Ok languages of West Papua. Komanarepket may be a distinct language.
