= Elevala River =

River in Papua New Guinea

- Location within Papua New Guinea

Location
- Country: Papua New Guinea
- Region: Western Province

Physical characteristics
- Source
  - location: Papua New Guinea
- Mouth
  - coordinates: 6°04′00″S 141°24′48″E

The Elevala River is a river in southwestern Papua New Guinea. It flows into the Fly River.

== See also ==
- List of rivers of Papua New Guinea
- Kamula–Elevala languages
