= Awin language =

Papuan language of Papua New Guinea

Aekyom
- Awin
- Region: Kiunga District, Western (Fly) Province, Papua New Guinea
- Native speakers: (20,000 cited 2000)
- Language family: Trans–New Guinea: Awin–Pa; Aekyom

Language codes
- ISO 639-3: awi
- Glottolog: aeky1238

Aekyom (Akium), also known as Awin (Aiwin), is a Papuan language of Papua New Guinea.

== Phonology ==
The following table details the consonants of Aekyom.

=== Consonants ===
| | | Bilabial | Alveolar | Palatal | Velar | Glottal |
|---|---|---|---|---|---|---|
| Nasal | | m | n | | ŋ | |
| Plosive | voiceless | p | t | | k | |
| Plosive | aspirated | pʰ | tʰ | | kʰ | |
| Plosive | voiced | b | d | | ɡ | |
| Fricative | | | s | | | h |
| Approximant | | w | ɺ | j | | |

=== Vowels ===
| | Front | Central | Back |
|---|---|---|---|
| Close | i | | u |
| Mid | e | | o |
| Open | æ | a | |
