= Densar language =

Language of Indonesia

Densar
- Region: Papua Province, Indonesia
- Language family: Bayono–Awbono: Densar

Language codes
- ISO 639-3: None (mis)
- Glottolog: None

Densar is a poorly attested Bayono–Awbono language spoken in the highlands of Papua Province, Indonesia. Glottolog tentatively groups it with Awbono.

All that is known of Densar is a few dozen words given in Wilbrink (2004). The language had been recorded by Wilbrink during a sago grub festival in Seradela District, Yahukimo Regency in April 2001.

== Vocabulary ==
A 42-word list of Densar is provided by Wilbrink (2004).

no.	gloss	Densar
1	head	ˈbabi
2	hair	babaˈmina
3	eye	s̪uˈki
4	ear	kɔbuˈka
5	nose	bɔnteˈmɔn
6	mouth	bɔʰɔmˈka
8	tooth	iˈbi
9	tongue	ˈkibʏn
10	upper arm	ˈdimɾʏ
11	elbow	dɪˈdamu
12	finger	dɪˈdja
13	fingernail	dɪˈɾa
14	breast	ʔaˈma
15	stomach	s̪ɪŋˈkɛ
16	liver	guˈmɔ
17	leg	neˈqa
20	skin	[digjɔ]qa
21	blood	t̪ɵˈɾɔ
22	bone	kuˈɾa/[dɪˈba]kɵˈɾu
23	flesh	ˈjabe
97	stone	tuum
101	water	ɒ
103	river	ɒ
104	lake	ɒkuɾɪŋjæn
112	star	qaniˈni
113	fire	ni
114	smoke	tiŋˈgɔ
154	one	jã
155	two	ˈjãmɾʏ
156	three	bɾʊmˈɾʊ/ˈbɾʊmɾʊ
157	four	ʔɔˈtɛɛmɾʊ
158	five	ʔɔˈtɔgwa
159	six	gɔˈtɔŋwa
160	seven	gɔˈgɔga
161	eight	ˈogbenugwa
162	nine	mɔˈtuʷga
163	ten	ɵˈmɪŋga
179	wet	ɒt̪aɾiˈɾi
222	burn (intr.)	aɾudɪhɪnjã
240	heart	guˈmɔ
253	heavy	kɔ̃n
269	sick	tuˈkɾu
