= Tangko language =

Ok language spoken in Indonesia

Tangko
- Okdamor
- Native to: Indonesia
- Region: Kawemaot village, Highland Papua
- Native speakers: (100 cited 2000)
- Language family: Trans–New Guinea: Central & South New Guinea ?; Ok; Tangko–Nakai; Tangko

Language codes
- ISO 639-3: tkx
- Glottolog: tang1353
- ELP: Tangko

Tangko is a somewhat divergent Ok language of Kawemaot village, Pegunungan Bintang Regency, Highland Papua, Indonesia.
