= Oksapmin Rural LLG =

Local-level government in Papua New Guinea

- Location within Papua New Guinea
- Coordinates: 5.224504°S 142.221617°E
- Country: Papua New Guinea
- Province: Sandaun Province

Languages
  - Main languages: Oksapmin
- Time zone: UTC+10 (AEST)

Oksapmin Rural LLG is a local-level government (LLG) of Sandaun Province, Papua New Guinea. The Oksapmin language is spoken in the LLG.

== Wards ==
- 01. Ranimap
- 02. Betianap
- 03. Divanap
- 04. Kuiva
- 05. Kusanap
- 06. Mitaganap
- 07. Tekap
- 08. Teranap
- 09. Tomianap
- 10. Seremty
- 11. Oksapmin
- 12. Bimin
- 13. Daburap
- 14. Duban
- 15. Kweptanap
- 16. Sungtem
- 17. Umanap
- 18. Akiapmin
- 19. Lembana
- 20. Monduban
- 21. Tomware

== See also ==
- Oksapmin language
