= Bayono language =

Papuan language

Bayono
- Enamesi, Swesu; Densar
- Region: Papua Province, Indonesia: Eilanden-Steenboom River area
- Native speakers: 300 (2020)
- Language family: Bayono–Awbono: Bayono

Language codes
- ISO 639-3: byl
- Glottolog: bayo1260
- ELP: Bayono

Bayono (Enamesi, Swesu) is a Papuan language spoken in the highlands of Papua Province, Indonesia. All that is known of Bayono is a few hundred words recorded in first-contact situations recorded in Wilbrink (2004) and Hischier (2006).

A Bayono word list from Jacky Menanti is published in Wilbrink (2004).

Kovojab may be closely related.
