= Momuna–Mek languages =

Trans–New Guinea language grouping

Momuna–Mek
- Geographic distribution: central New Guinea
- Linguistic classification: Trans–New Guinea: Central West New Guinea; Momuna–Mek
- Proto-language: Proto-Momuna–Mek
- Subdivisions: Mek; Momuna

Language codes
- ISO 639-3: –
- Glottolog: None

The Momuna–Mek languages are a group of Trans–New Guinea families in central New Guinea established by Timothy Usher, though with precedents in earlier studies.

== Languages ==
The languages of Momuna–Mek are the Mek language family and the Momuna (Somahai) language.

== Reconstruction ==
Usher (2020) reconstructs the consonant and vowel inventories as follows:

m	n			
p	t		k	kʷ
b	d		g	gʷ
	s			
w	l	j		

i		u
e		o
ɛ		ɔ
	a	ɒ

ei	ou
ɛi	ɔu
ai	au
aɛ	aɔ

Only a few of the pronouns have been reconstructed:

	sg	pl
1	*na	
2	*kɒn	
3		*tun
