= Pa language =

Papuan language of Papua New Guinea

Pa
- Pare
- Region: Western (Fly) Province, Papua New Guinea
- Native speakers: ≈5,900
- Language family: Trans–New Guinea: Awin–Pa; Pa

Language codes
- ISO 639-3: ppt
- Glottolog: pare1271

Pa, also known as Pare or Akium-Pare, is a Papuan language belonging to the Trans–New Guinea language family. It is spoken by approximately 5,900 people in the Western Province.
