= Dyadic kinship term =

Kinship terms

Dyadic kinship terms (abbreviated DY or DYAD) are kinship terms in a few languages that express the relationship between individuals as they relate one to the other. In English, there are a few set phrases for such situations, such as "they are father and son", but there is not a single dyadic term that can be used the way "they are cousins" can; even the latter is not truly dyadic, as it does not necessarily mean that they are cousins to each other. The few, and uncommon, English dyadic terms involve in-laws: co-mothers-in-law, co-fathers-in-law, co-brothers-in-law, co-sisters-in-law, co-grandmothers, and co-grandfathers.

Examples of dyadic terms for blood kin include Kayardild (Australian) ngamathu-ngarrba "mother and child", derived from ngamathu "mother", and kularrin-ngarrba "brother and sister", from kularrin "cross-sibling", with the dyadic suffix -ngarrba. Not all such terms are derived; the Ok language Mian has a single unanalysable root lum for "father and child".

Dyadic blood-kin terms are rare in Indo-European languages. Examples are Icelandic and Faroese, which have the terms feðgar "father and son", feðgin "father and daughter", mæðgin "mother and son", mæðgur "mother and daughter".

Chinese and Japanese use compound nouns to make dyadic terms, such as (in Japanese) 親子 oyako "parent and child", 兄弟 kyōdai "brothers; siblings", 姉妹 shimai "sisters", and 夫婦 fūfu "husband and wife".

The languages which have such terms are concentrated in the western Pacific. There are at least ten in New Guinea, including Oksapmin, Menya, and the Ok languages; fifteen or more Austronesian languages, from Taiwan to New Caledonia; and at least sixty in Australia, such as Kayardild above. There are sporadic examples in Northern Eurasia, including a few Turkic and Uralic languages, Yukaghir, and Ainu; depending on definitions, the Yi languages of Southeast Asia may also be said to have such terms. Elsewhere they are rare, or at least have not been described. Known languages include Athabaskan (Koyukon and Carrier), Pomo, and Southern Paiute in North America, Quechua, Paezan (Nasa Yuwe), and Cariban (Tiriyo) in South America, Adyghe in the Caucasus, and Khoe (Kxoe, Gǀwi) in southern Africa.
