= Ngalum people =

Ngalum
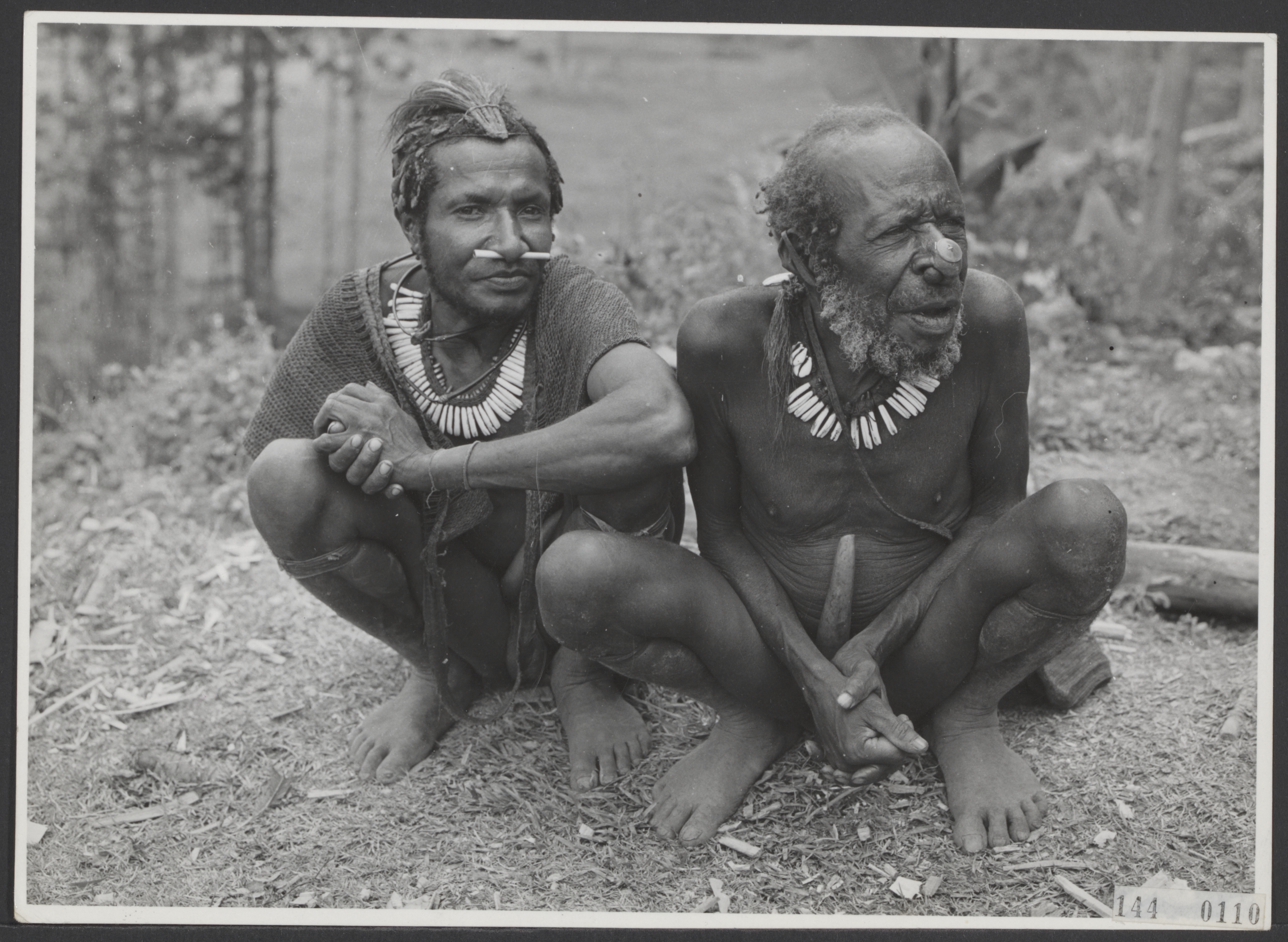
- Sibil men, 1959

Total population
- 53.116

Regions with significant populations
- Indonesia (Highland Papua): 29.116
- Papua New Guinea (Sandaun): 24.000

Languages
- Ngalum

Religion
- Christianity 84,63%

Related ethnic groups
- Murop, Kupel, Lepki

Ngalum people are an ethnic group primiarly inhabiting the eastern part of Highland Papua. In Indonesia, they reside in the Bintang Mountain Regency, while in Papua New Guinea, they live in Sandaun and Western Provinces.

== Identity ==
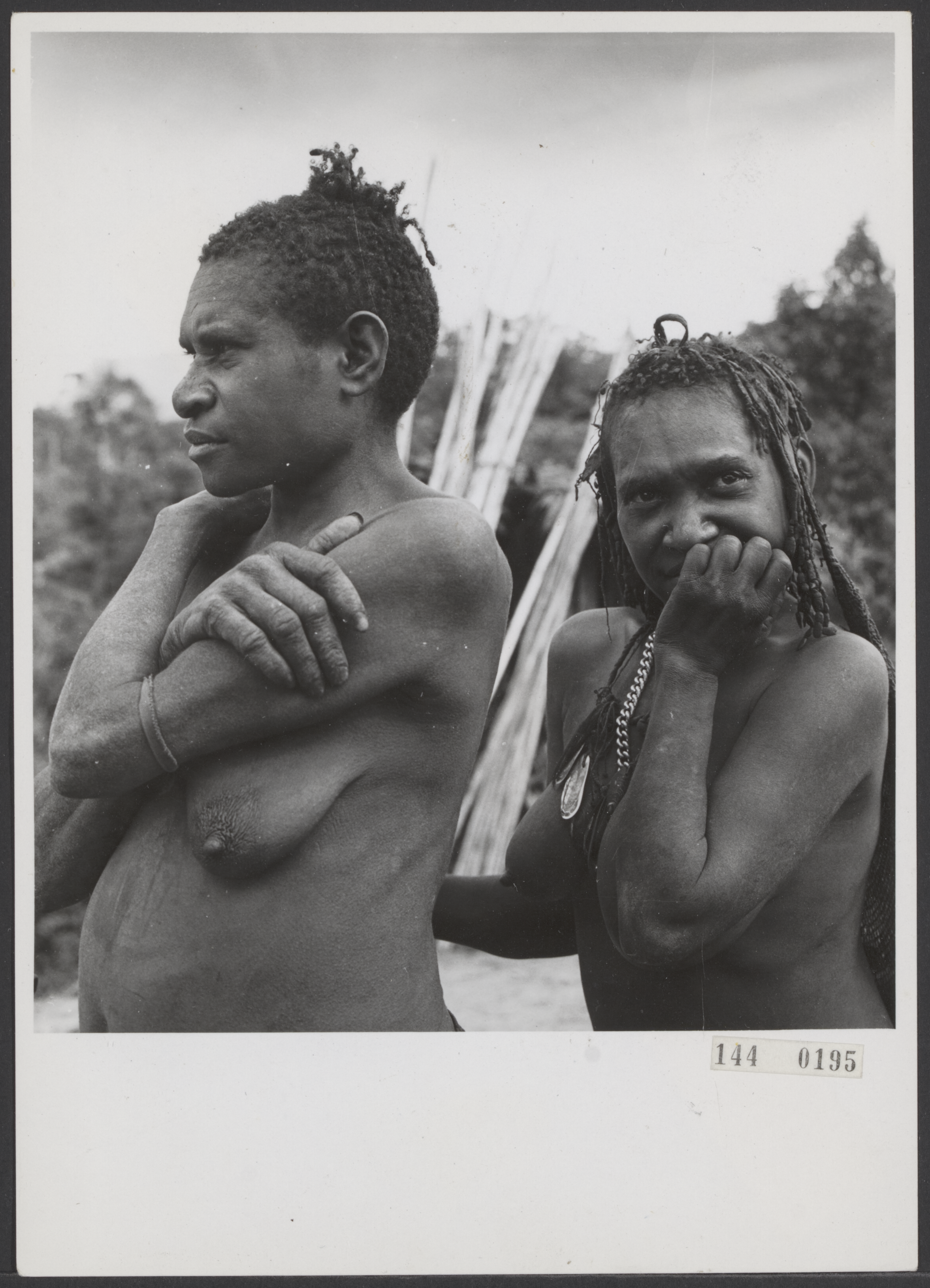
Sibil women

The name 'Ngalum' refers to the community group that resides between the slopes of Puncak Mandala and Telefomin District in Papua New Guinea. Another term used by anthropologists is "Ok," which means water in the Ngalum language. This is because the Ngalum people always live near water sources such as rivers. Many places in the Bintang Mountains are named with the prefix "Ok." Ngalum is the majority ethnic group of the Bintang Mountains, making up 42.61% of the total population.According to the myth of Aplim Apom Sibilki (the child of Aplim Apom), the ancestors of the Ngalum, known as Kaka I Onkora and Kaka I Ase, were created by Atangki (the creator) on Puncak Mandala. This caused the mountain to be sacred to them. The term Aplim Apom comes from several words: Ap means house, Lim means blood or fire, and Om means taro. Males are symbolized by Aplim, while females are symbolized by Apom. Atangki is believed to be a spirit that lives in harmony with nature and the living beings around it. Several other tribes in Bintang Mountain also believe in this myth. Today, Atangki is equated with God in Christianity.

== Belief ==
Ngalum's indigenous belief centers on the creation of humans by Aplim Apom, which carries philosophical and ideological values as the foundation of their way of life. They have sacred objects that are kept in iwol. Religious ceremonies are also conducted in iwol. They believe in the presence of a creator (Atangki), protectors (Onkor and Kakalakonaki), and malevolent spirits (Kaseng).

Today, the majority of the Ngalum people adhere to Catholicism, with a small portion following Protestantism. This began with the Catholic mission entering their region in 1956. There are no official records of the religion followed by all members of the tribe, but in Oksibil, where the Ngalum is the majority, 80% of the population is Catholic.

== Social life ==
The Ngalum follows the iwolmai system, a patrilineal clan structure. An iwolmai consists of several families within a village and is led by an iwolmai ngolki. An iwol (village) is made up of multiple iwolmai. Currently, there are 417 recorded iwolmai in Bintang Mountains.

In traditional ceremonies, leadership roles (ngolki) are divided as follows:

- Oksangki is responsible for dances
- Om bonengki manages agriculture and food supplies.
- Ap iwol ngolki leads the men's traditional house (bokam).
- Barki is a customary figure who plays sacred roles in ceremonies or rituals.
- Kaka nalkonki is the leader in warfare.
- Jebulki is responsible for preserving ancestral heirlooms.

These roles are obtained through a series of processes that begin with a traditional initiation (tena kamil). Those who have undergone this initiation are called tukon.

There are three social classes in Ngalum society: the ngolki (leaders), common people, and non-Ngalum individuals. This classification becomes apparent during traditional ceremonies. If a member of the community commits a violation, they are judged by the tribal elders under the leadership of the Iwolmai-ngolki. Punishments can be severe, such as hand amputation for thieves. As a result, the crime rate in Ngalum-inhabited areas is low.

== Houses and villages ==
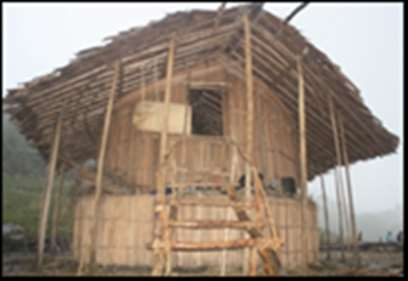
Ap Iwol house

The traditional villages of the Ngalum people are circular or round in shape and are located on hillsides. These houses are called Ap Iwol. The walls of the house are made from branches, tree limbs, and pine wood planks arranged in a circular pattern. The floor is made from the bark of the nipa palm tree. The house has no windows, but there are doors at the front and back entrances. The doors are built about half a meter above the floor, so the inhabitants inside cannot be seen from the outside, and a ladder is provided for access. The roof slopes to the sides, not in a conical shape, and is supported by a frame and stakes surrounding the walls of the house.

There are several types of houses, including the house for men, called bokam iwol (a house for men who have undergone the bokam initiation ceremony), and the house for women, called abib or jingilabib (the core house). The jingilabib house is often inhabited by a nuclear family. There is also the sukam house, which is designated for women who are menstruating or giving birth. In general, traditional houses have only one door and no windows. Today, this village layout is being abandoned, and houses are now built in a row, following the pattern of the roads.

== Livelihoods ==
The main livelihood of the Ngalum people is farming. The crops they commonly cultivate include taro, sweet potatoes, yam, palmgrass, yamen leaves, and aibika. Later, they grew red beans, soybeans, carrots, cabbage, and tomatoes after the missionaries introduced those plants.

== Culture ==
=== Trade ===
In the past, trade activities in the mountainous areas of Papua were difficult to carry out due to limited access. It was not until the early 20th century that the Ngalum tribe began engaging in trade with coastal tribes. The Ngalum used shell money as currency and they called it siwol. They obtained siwol from the southern coast of Papua in the Merauke. The value of siwol depended on its color and size.

The commodities traded with the populations around the Papua New Guinea border, as well as those near the upper reaches of the Digul River include pigs (kang), arrows (ara), bows (ebon), stone axes (papie), dog teeth (anoniji), baskets (noken), bird-of-paradise feathers (kulep), and garden produce. In addition to obtaining siwol in the southern regions like Mindiptana and Merauke, they also acquired salt.

The economic system and the modern currency were introduced to the Ngalum people after the Catholic mission entered their territories in 1956.

=== Marriage ===
In traditional marriage, the process begins with a proposal. The proposal can be made either through a direct request by the parents, a request from the man’s family, or using a figurative question, "Mena puka yepki nek ne nere," which means "That young basket is beautiful, will you give it to me?" The basket (noken) symbolizes women because women always carry it when working or traveling. If the proposal is accepted, the man’s side will gather a dowry to be paid to the woman’s side. In the past, items that could be accepted as dowry were dog teeth (anon ningil), stone axes (takol papi), pigs (kang), baskets (noken), and shell money (siwol wan). The dowry payment continues when a child is born. This dowry is called tena sibi and must be given every time a child is born. Couples who wish to marry without parental coercion may also elope (namal). The process involves men dancing, with women watching and choosing the dancer they like, then following him home after the dance is over. Namal is commonly done during dances such as oksang, yimne, bar, and jambir.

=== Medicine ===
The Ngalum people use natural materials for medicinal purposes. Materials that are utilized for medicine are yamen leaves, West Indian wood nettle, and red fruits. These medicines have various functions, such as aiding the birth process, treating fever, alleviating discomfort, and also enhancing body immunity and fertility.

=== Pig as a status symbol ===
In the Papua region, the pig is commonly known as a status symbol. The more pigs a person or a village owns, the higher their status. The slaughtering and serving of pigs are commonly done during traditional ceremonies. Pigs are also one of the dowries. In Oksibil, the price of a live pig ranges from Rp10 to 40 million per head, with the price per kilogram around Rp100,000.

=== Death and burial ===
Ngalum's death ceremonies are differentiated for ngolki and common people. A ngolki who passed away was placed inside the bokam iwol building, which could only be entered by certain individuals. The bokam iwol could not be entered by women or young people who have not undergone initiation. After the mourning period, a pig feast was held, and the family and community provided it. One pig’s head was then placed in the body, along with the taro. The pig's head was placed on the right side of the body, and the taro was on the left side. The entire community present at the ceremony formed a procession to the burial site. Along the way, they mourned and sang the death songs. The day after the burial, taro seedlings were planted in the family’s garden. The planting was done by a family member, usually an older brother or the eldest son.

The burial for ordinary people did not involve placing a pig's head and taro beside the body. The mourning was expressed by shaving or taking a few strands of hair from the deceased, which were then kept in a special place. The mourning period lasts for three days after the burial.

In the past, Ngalum people disposed of a body by wrapping markon leaves, then covering it with woven tree bark, and tying it with rattan cords. After some time, the body decayed so it only left the skeleton of the deceased lying on the floor of a cave. The use of wooden coffins commenced when missionaries entered the region around 1956 and has continued to the present day.

== Bibliography ==
- Ananta, Aris; Utami, Dwi Retno Wilujeng Wahyu; Handayani, Nur Budi (2016). "Statistics on Ethnic Diversity in the Land of Papua, Indonesia". Asia & the Pacific Policy Studies. 3 (3): 458–474. doi:10.1002/app5.143. ISSN 2050-2680.
- Hylkema, S. (1974). Mannen in het draagnet (in Dutch). Internet Archive. 's-Gravenhage: M. Nijhoff.
- Kurniawan, Aan; Ayomi, Ivon; et al. (2012). Buku Seri Etnografi Kesehatan Ibu dan Anak 2012 Etnik Ngalum Distrik Oksibil Kabupaten Pegunungan Bintang, Provinsi Papua. Jakarta: Badan Penelitian dan Pengembangan Kesehatan, Kementerian Kesehatan RI. ISBN 978-602-235-228-0.
- Maryone, Rini (2010). "FUNGSI SIWOL BAGI KEHIDUPAN SUKU NGALUM". Jurnal Penelitian Arkeologi Papua Dan Papua Barat. 2 (1): 45–53. ISSN 2580-9237. Archived from the original on 2023-02-04.
- Maryone, Rini (2012). "TRADISI PENGUBURAN PRASEJARAH SUKU NGALUM DI KABUPATEN PEGUNUNGAN BINTANG". Jurnal Penelitian Arkeologi Papua Dan Papua Barat. 4 (1): 9–17. ISSN 2580-9237. Archived from the original on 2023-02-04.
- Melalatoa, M. Junus (1995). Ensiklopedi Suku Bangsa di Indonesia Jilid L-Z. Jakarta: Departemen Pendidikan dan Kebudayaan RI. p. 632.
- Mimin, Imanuel H. (8 June 2019). "Mengenal Suku Ngalum Ok di Pegunungan Bintang". suarapapua.com.
- Na’im, Akhsan; Syaputra, Hendry (2010). Kewarganegaraan, Suku Bangsa, Agama, dan Bahasa Sehari-hari Penduduk Indonesia. Jakarta: Badan Pusat Statistik. p. 27. ISBN 978-979-064-417-5.
- Papua, Peghubung. "Kabupaten Pegunungan Bintang". Badan Penghubung Daerah Provinsi Papua. Archived from the original on 2020-06-09.
- Project, Joshua. "Ngalum | Joshua Project". joshuaproject.net.
- Sitokdana, Melkior N.N; Hiktaop, Kristianus; et al. (2020). Perdamaian Pegunungan Bintang [Untuk Membangun Peradaban Manusia Aplim Apom]. Salatiga: Satya Wacana University Press. ISBN 978-602-5881-68-8.
