= Faiwol language =

Ok language of Papua New Guinea and Indonesia

Faiwol
- Region: Western Province, Papua New Guinea & South Papua, Indonesia
- Native speakers: (4,500 cited 1987)
- Language family: Trans–New Guinea: Central & South New Guinea ?; Ok; Mountain Ok; Faiwol

Language codes
- ISO 639-3: fai – inclusive code Individual code: stm – Setaman
- Glottolog: faiw1243 Faiwol seta1246 Setaman
- ELP: Faiwol
- Setaman

Faiwol is one of the Ok languages of Papua New Guinea and Indonesia. It is spoken at the headwaters of the Fly, Palmer, and Murray rivers in Western Province. There are numerous dialects, including Faiwol proper, Angkiyak, Wopkei, Setaman, Selbang, Dimtikin, and Kauwol on the Indonesian border.
