= Awbono language =

Papuan language of Indonesia

Awbono
- Awban
- Region: Modera River area in Kampung Awban, Kolf Brazza District, Asmat Regency, South Papua, Indonesia
- Native speakers: (100 cited 1999)
- Language family: Bayono–Awbono: Awbono

Language codes
- ISO 639-3: awh
- Glottolog: awbo1238
- ELP: Awbono

Awbono or Awban is a Papuan language spoken in the south of Jayawijaya Mountains, specifically in Awban Village, Kolf Brazza District, Asmat Regency, South Papua, Indonesia. All that is known of Awbono is a few hundred words recorded in first-contact situations recorded in Wilbrink (2004) and Hischier (2006).

An Awbono word list from Jacky Menanti is published in Wilbrink (2004).

Densar, which is poorly attested, may be closely related.
