= Ninggerum language =

Ok language of Indonesia and Papua New Guinea

Ninggerum
- Ningrum, Muyu
- Region: Western Province; South Papua; Boven Digoel Regency
- Native speakers: 4,950 (2001)
- Language family: Trans–New Guinea: Central & South New Guinea ?; Ok; Lowland Ok; Ninggerum

Language codes
- ISO 639-3: nxr
- Glottolog: ning1274
- ELP: Ninggerum

Ninggerum is one of the Ok languages of Papua New Guinea and South Papua, Indonesia. In Indonesia, the language is called Ningrum and is spoken in Kampung Jetetkun (Ninati District), Kampung Binkauk, and Kampung Detaw in Boven Digoel Regency.

It is one of several related languages called Muyu.

== Phonology ==
=== Consonants ===
Consonants
	Labial	Alveolar	Palatal	Velar	Glottal
Nasal	m	n		ŋ	
Plosive	p	t d		k ɡ	
Fricative	β	s			h
Approximant	w		j		
Tap/Flap		ɾ			
Lateral Flap		ɺ			

Vowels
	Front	Central	Back
Close	i		u
Mid	ɛ		ɔ
Open		ɐ	
