= Pluractionality =

Grammatical aspect denoting verbal plural

In linguistics, pluractionality, or verbal number, if not used in its aspectual sense, is a grammatical aspect that indicates that the action or participants of a verb is, or are, plural. This differs from frequentative or iterative aspects in that the latter have no implication for the number of participants of the verb.

Often a pluractional transitive verb indicates that the object is plural, whereas in a pluractional intransitive verb the subject is plural. This is sometimes taken as an element of ergativity in the language. However, the essence of pluractionality is that the action of the verb is plural, whether because several people perform the action, it is performed on several objects, or it is performed several times. The exact interpretation may depend on the semantics of the verb as well as the context in which it is used. The lack of verbal number does not generally mean that the action and participants are singular, but rather that there is no particularly notable plurality; thus it may be better described as paucal vs. multiple rather than singular vs. plural.

Although English does not have verbal number as a grammatical device, many English verbs such as stampede and massacre are used when one of the participants involves a large number. English also has a number of verbs (often ending in -le, such as nibble) which indicate repetitive actions, and this is similar to some types of grammatically-marked pluractionality in other languages.

== In Ainu ==
The Ainu language of Japan has a closed class of 'count verbs'. The majority of these end in -pa, an iterative suffix that has become lexicalized on some verbs. For example, kor means 'to have something or a few things', and kor-pa 'to have many things'; there are also causative forms of the latter, kor-pa-re 'to give (one person) many things', kor-pa-yar 'to give (several people) many things'. The -pa may occur more than once; this may be a case of the pluractional verb in its iterative aspect:

hosip-pa-pa "everyone came back"

There are also suppletive forms:

Ainu suppletive pluractionals
Paucal	Multiple	Trans.
an	oka(y)	to be
as	roski	to stand
a	rok	to sit
arpa, oman	paye	to go
ek	arki	to come
rayke	ronnu	to kill
uk	uyna	to take

In addition to literal number, pluractionality can be used for politeness, much as plural pronouns are in many languages. (See T–V distinction.)

== In Georgian ==
Georgian shows an illuminating distinction between verbal and nominal number. Georgian verbs may be suppletive for tense and animacy as well as number. When a noun occurs with a numeral in Georgian, it takes the singular form regardless of its semantic number. Verbal agreement is syntactic, and therefore is also singular. However, the pluractionality of the verbal root remains plural. Thus,

Singular participant, singular verb:

ivane da-ǧd-a
John(SG) PFV-sit(SG)-3SG
"John sat down"

Plural participant, plural verb:

čem-i mšobl-eb-i da-sxd-nen
my-NOM parent-PL-NOM PFV-sit(PL)-3PL
"My parents sat down"

Grammatically singular but semantically plural participant, mixed verb:

čem-i sam-i megobar-i da-sxd-a
my-NOM three-NOM friend(SG)-NOM PFV-sit(PL)-3SG
"My three friends sat down"

(See Interlinear gloss to explain the format of these examples.)

== In Mongolic ==
The Mongolian verb has no personal conjugation, but three different voices requiring a plural subject – reciprocal, cooperative and pluritative –, of which the pluritative may be seen as a true verbal plural. Cognate forms are found in other Mongolic languages and can be reconstructed to Proto-Mongolic.

== In Muskogean ==
Muskogean languages such as Koasati have a three-way distinction, with singular, dual, and plural verbs. However, it is not clear if this is pluractionality or simply suppletive verbal agreement for number. See Koasati language for details.

== In Hopi ==
In Hopi, dual nouns as subjects take the suffix -vit and singular verbs. Hopi does not have dual pronouns, but the plural pronouns may be used with singular verbs with a dual meaning. However, it is not clear if this is pluractionality or simply number agreement on the verb. See Hopi language for details.

== In Central Pomo ==
The Central Pomo language of California distinguishes ʔčʰá·w 'sit, stay' and pluractional napʰów for more than one person. The perfective suffix -w on these verbs may be replaced with -t for a plural object:

háyu š-čé-w
dog hook-catch-PFV
"He tied up the dog."

háyu š-čé-t
dog hook-catch-PFV.PL
"He tied up the dogs."

As in Ainu, pluractionality may be used for politeness.

== In Hausa ==
Chadic languages such as Hausa use reduplicated verbs with "a general meaning of a repeated action, an action simultaneously performed by several agents, and action performed on more than one object, or various combinations of these 'plural' meanings" (Eulenberg 1971). There are also derived forms:

- naa aikee su 'I sent them'
- naa a”aikee su 'I sent(pl) them'

The first implies that I sent them all together, whereas the second means that I sent them at different times or to different places.

== In Papuan languages ==
Pluractionality is not uncommon in New Guinea. The Koiarian language Barai has suppletive forms:

fi	'one sits'	kari	'many sit'
abe	'take one'	ke	'take many'

== In Slavic languages ==
The Slavic verb can express pluractionality as part of its morphological equipment besides iterativity. In Slovak and Czech, it is often formed by the prefix po- + iterative form, cf Slovak:

- išla 'she went' - chodila (iterative) 'she went (often, to many places); walked (about); wandered; circulated'
- pochodila (pluractional) 'she went (to all possible places); visited (all possible people)'

Prefixation generally produces perfective meaning in Slavic verb, so due to the po- prefixation, the pluractional form is aspectually perfective while the iterative is imperfective. That is why, morphologically, this pluractional form may seem as just a perfective counterpart to iterative (chodila - pochodila), yet there is a difference. The pluractional form differs in valency from the iterative form. While the iterative retains the valency of the original verb, the pluractional takes a direct object. So, whereas išla and its iterative chodila requires a directional preposition (išla (chodila) do Malej Fatry / k doktorovi 'she went (often/regularly went) to the Malá Fatra mountains / to (see) a doctor'), the pluractional pochodila takes a direct object: pochodila (celú) Malú Fatru; pochodila (všetkých možných) doktorov 'she wandered the whole of the Malá Fatra mountains; she went to / consulted (all possible) doctors'. (Alternatively, the accusative direct object can be replaced by the preposition po + locative: pochodila po (celej) Malej Fatre; pochodila po (všetkých možných) doktoroch, which has a nuance of a weaker, less expressive perhaps, extent of the action. This construction is also possible with iterative, but then the pluractional meaning is lost.) The change in valency raises the question whether Slavic pluractional forms are lexical, rather than grammatical, derivations; a question similar to the case of Ainu and its suppletive forms.

== In American Sign Language ==
In American Sign Language, verbal number is expressed through reduplication. There are several verbal aspects using modified reduplication that indicate frequent or iterative action; these are unusual cross-linguistically in that transitive verbs lose their transitivity. In addition, transitive verbs may be reduplicated to show plurality of their object; the motion of the verb is either extended or repeated to cover the spatial locations of multiple objects or recipients. These are true duals and plurals, and so may be best thought of as object incorporation rather than pluractionality. For example, ask someone a question is signed by flexing the index finger of an upright G hand in the direction of that person; the dual involves flexing it at both object loci (sequentially with one hand or simultaneously with both), the simple plural involves a single flexing, which spans the object group while the hand arcs across it, and an individuated plural involves multiple rapid flexings while the hand arcs.
