= Somahai language =

Trans–New Guinea language spoken in Indonesia

Momuna
- Somahai
- Native to: Indonesia
- Region: Highland Papua: Yahukimo Regency; South Papua: western Asmat Regency
- Native speakers: (2,200 cited 1998–2000)
- Language family: Trans–New Guinea: Central West New Guinea; Momuna–Mek; Momuna
- Dialects: Momuna; Momina

Language codes
- ISO 639-3: Either: mqf – Momuna mmb – Momina
- Glottolog: soma1242

Momuna (Momina), also known as Somahai (Somage, Sumohai), is a Papuan language spoken in Yahukimo Regency, Highland Papua and Asmat Regency, South Papua, Indonesia.

== Varieties ==
Reimer notes two dialects, one on the Balim River and one on the Rekai. One of the differences is that when /u/ follows an /u/ or /o/ in the Balim dialect, it is /i/ in the Rekai dialect. Thus the ethnonym 'Momuna' is pronounced 'Momina' in Rekai dialect.

== Classification ==
The Somahai pronouns, singular *na, *ka, *mo, are typical of Trans–New Guinea languages. They were placed in the Central and South New Guinea branch of that family by Wurm. Ross could not locate enough evidence to classify them. Usher found them to be closest to the Mek languages, in the Central West New Guinea, which partially overlaps with Wurm's C&SNG.

== Phonology ==
Consonants
	Labial	Alveolar	Velar
Plosive	b	t	k
Fricative		s	
Nasal	m	n	
Approximant	w	r	j

Vowels
	Front	Central	Back
High	i		u
Mid-high	e		o
Mid-low	ɛ		ɔ
Low		a	

Additionally, there are at most three tones: high, low, and mid. The mid tone only occurs on monosyllabic words.

== Vocabulary ==
The following basic vocabulary words of Momuna are from Voorhoeve (1975), as cited in the Trans-New Guinea database:

gloss	Momuna
head	toko
hair	toko-ate
eye	otu
tooth	ija
leg	i jo-ku
louse	amega
dog	kwoka
pig	uwo
egg	magisaga
blood	janɨ
bone	toko
skin	ke
tree	kwo
man	mogo-mearu
sun	ɨkɨ
water	iŋga
fire	kukwa
stone	kɨ
eat	nowa-
