= Mian language =

Trans–New Guinea language spoken in Papua New Guinea

Mian
- Native to: Papua New Guinea
- Region: Sandaun province, Telefomin district
- Ethnicity: Mianmin
- Native speakers: (from 1,400 cited 2000 census) to 3,500 (2007)
- Language family: Trans–New Guinea: Central & South New Guinea ?; Ok; Mountain; Mian

Language codes
- ISO 639-3: mpt – inclusive code Individual code: sug – Suganga
- Glottolog: mian1255
- ELP: Mian
- Suganga

Mian is an Ok language spoken in the Telefomin district of the Sandaun province in Papua New Guinea by the Mian people. It has some 3,500 speakers spread across two dialects: West Mian (a.k.a. Suganga), with approximately 1,000 speakers in around Yapsiei, and East Mian, with approximately 2,500 speakers in and around Timeilmin, Temsakmin, Sokamin, Gubil, Fiak and Hotmin.

== Phonology ==
Phonologically, Mian is very similar to other Papuan languages in the size of its phoneme inventory, but it nevertheless has some peculiarities, such as its contrast between a plain [a] and a pharyngealized [aˤ]. It is also a tonal language.

=== Vowels ===
Mian has six vowels, including the pharyngealized open front vowel.

Mian vowels
	Front	Back
	Unrounded	Rounded
Close	i /i/	u /u/
Close-mid		o /o/
Open-mid	e /ɛ/	
Open	a /a/ aa /aˤ/	

Mian also has four diphthongs:

Mian diphthongs
Ending with /i/	Ending with /u/
ai /a͡i/	au /a͡u/
ei /ɛ͡i/	ou /o͡u/

/ɛ/ is realized as [ə] in word-initial low-tone syllables, [ɛ] elsewhere.

/a/ is realized as [ɐ] in unaccented syllables, [ə] in word-initial low-tone syllables beginning with a consonant, [a] elsewhere.

/o/ is realized as [ɔ] in word-initial low-tone syllables and in syllables ending in a voiceless plosive or [ŋ], [o] elsewhere.

/u/ is realized as [ʊ] in word-initial low-tone syllables, [u] elsewhere.

=== Consonants ===
Mian has 16 consonants:

Mian consonants
		Labial	Alveolar	Palatal	Velar		Glottal
		Labial	Alveolar	Palatal	Plain	Labialized	Glottal
Plosive	Voiceless		t ⟨t⟩		k ⟨k⟩	kʷ ⟨kw⟩	
Plosive	Voiced	b ⟨b⟩	d ⟨d⟩		ɡ ⟨g⟩	ɡʷ ⟨gw⟩	
Nasal		m ⟨m⟩	n ⟨n⟩		ŋ ⟨ng⟩		
Fricative		f ⟨f⟩	s ⟨s⟩				h ⟨h⟩
Approximant			l ⟨l⟩	j ⟨y⟩		w ⟨w⟩	

/b/ is realized as [ᵐb] word-initially, [pʰ] or [p̚] syllable-finally, [b] elsewhere.

Examples: banǒn [ᵐbànǒn] lower arm, mǎab [mǎˤːp̚] frog, teběl [tʰɛ̀bɛ̌l] ant

/t/ is realized as [tʰ] before vowels, [tʰ] or [t̚] syllable-finally.

Examples: tam [tʰàm] temple, mát [mát̚] gall bladder

/k/ is realized as [kʰ] before vowels, [kʰ] or [k̚] syllable-finally, sometimes [x] between vowels, [qʰ] before [aˤ].

Examples: kemin [kʰèmìn] to do, manggěk [màŋgɛ̌k̚] bee, okok [òxòk̚] work, kaawá [qʰàˤwá] steel axe

/ɡ/ is realized as [ᵑɡ] word-initially, [ɡ] elsewhere.

Examples: gát [ᵑɡát̚] mole, manggěk [màŋɡɛ̌k̚] bee

/ɡʷ/ is realized as [ᵑɡʷ] word-initially, [ɡʷ] elsewhere.

Examples: gwaán [ᵑɡʷàán] spider, gwalgwal [ᵑɡʷàlɡʷàl] twins

=== Tones ===
Mian has five tonemes, which apply at the word-stem level:

Mian tones
Tone	Example
Low	am [àm] house
High	án [án] arrow
Low-High	ǎam [ǎˤːm] Pandanus species
High-Low	hâs [hâs] hat
Low-High-Low	aam [àˤːm̂] older sister

The tones of Mian are very complex, as they are subject to various phonological processes, and furthermore, they can be used for indicating various grammatical aspects, especially in connection with verbs, where the tones are crucial for understanding.

Consider the two verb forms below, being non-hodiernal and imperfective respectively:

dolâbībe [dòlábíbè] I wrote
dolâbibe [dòlábìbè] I am writing

== Nouns ==
Large objects in Mian are feminine, while small objects are masculine.

imen-e
taro-M
'small/one taro'

imen-o
taro-F
'large taro/large quantity of taro'

== Digital resources ==
- Fedden, Sebastian; Timothy Feist; Matthew Baerman; Greville G. Corbett; Gunter Senft (2015). Mian and Kilivila Collection. University of Surrey. doi:10.15126/SMG.30/1.
