= Ok languages =

Trans–New Guinea language family

Ok
- Geographic distribution: New Guinea
- Linguistic classification: Trans–New Guinea: Central West New Guinea; Awyu–Ok; Ok
- Proto-language: Proto-Ok

Language codes
- Glottolog: okok1235
- Map: The Ok languages of New Guinea The Oksapmin languages Other Trans–New Guinea languages Other Papuan languages Austronesian languages Uninhabited

The Ok languages are a family of about a dozen related Trans–New Guinea languages spoken in a contiguous area of eastern Irian Jaya and western Papua New Guinea. The most numerous language is Ngalum, with some 20,000 speakers; the best known is probably Telefol.

The Ok languages have dyadic kinship terms.

== History of classification ==
The Ok languages are clearly related. Alan Healey identified them as a family in 1962. He later noted connections with the Asmat languages and Awyu–Dumut families (Healey 1970).

Voorhoeve developed this into a Central and South New Guinea (CSNG) proposal. As part of CSNG, the Ok languages form part of the original proposal for Trans–New Guinea, a position tentatively maintained by Malcolm Ross, though reduced nearly to Healey's original conception. Ross states that he cannot tell if the similarities in CSNG are shared innovations or retentions from proto-TNG. Voorhoeve argues specifically for an Awyu–Ok relationship, and Foley believes that these two families may be closest to Asmat among the TNG languages.

Loughnane and Fedden (2011) claim to have demonstrated that the erstwhile TNG isolate Oksapmin is related to the Ok family. However, this has not been generally accepted because loans from Mountain Ok have not been accounted for.

Van den Heuvel & Fedden (2014) argue that Greater Awyu and Greater Ok are not genetically related, but that their similarities are due to intensive contact.

== Languages ==
The languages are:

- Ok
  - West Ok: Kopkaka (incl. Kwer–Burumakok)
  - Ngalum
  - Central Ok: Tangko, Nakai–Naki
  - Lowland Ok: Iwur–Koma, Muyu–Yonggom, Ninggerum
  - Mountain Ok (Min)
    - Mian (incl. Suganga)
    - Central Mountain Ok: Tifal, Telefol (incl. Urap)
    - South Mountain Ok: Bin, Faiwol (incl. Kauwol, Setaman)

== Reconstruction ==
Proto-Ok
- Reconstruction of: Ok languages
- Reconstructed ancestors: Proto-Trans–New Guinea: Proto-Awyu–Ok

=== Phonology ===
The following are consonants of Proto-Ok:

Consonants
		Bilabial	Alveolar	Palatal	Velar	
		Bilabial	Alveolar	Palatal	plain	labialized
Nasal		*m	*n			
Plosive	plain	*p	*t		*k	*kʷ
Plosive	prenasalized	*ᵐb	*ⁿd	*ⁿdz	*ᵑɡ	*ᵑɡʷ
Fricative			*s			
Semivowel		*w		*j		
Rhotic			*ɾ			

Vowels may be /*iː *ʉ *uː *e *a *o/, but this reconstruction may be biased toward Telefol.

=== Pronouns ===
Healey & Ross reconstruct the pronouns of proto-Ok are as follows:

	m.sg	f.sg	pl
1	*na-		*nu[b], *ni[b]
2	*ka-b-	*ku-b-	*ki[b]
3	*ya	*yu	*[y]i

Usher (2020) reconstructs the independent pronouns as,

	m.sg	f.sg	pl
1ex	*ne		*nu
1in	*ne		*nu-p
2	*ke-p	*ku-p	*ki-p
3	*e	*u	*i [3pl.in *i-p]

and the subject suffixes as,

	m.sg	f.sg	pl
1	*-i		*-up
2	*-ep		*-ip
3	*-e/*-o	*-u	*-ip

=== Evolution ===
Proto-Mountain Ok reflexes of proto-Trans-New Guinea (pTNG) etyma, as quoted by Pawley & Hammarström (2018) from Healey (1964):

- *beːn ‘arm’ < *mbena
- *mburuŋ ‘fingernail’ < *mb(i,u)t(i,u)C
- *katuun ‘knee’ < *(ng,k)atVk
- *maŋkat ‘mouth’ < *maŋgat[a]
- *gitak ‘neck’ < *k(a,e)ndak
- *kum ‘side of neck’ < *kuma(n,ŋ)
- *mutuum ‘nose’ < *mundu
- *falaŋ ‘tongue’ < *mbilaŋ
- *kaliim ‘moon’ < *kal(a,i)m

=== Lexicon ===
==== Usher (2020) ====
Some lexical reconstructions by Usher (2020) are:

gloss	Proto-Ok	Proto-West Ok	Ngalum	Proto-Central Ok	Proto-Lowland Ok	Proto-Mountain Ok
head	*ambo[t]			*amb[o/u][t]	*ambo	*ŋgambɔːm
hair/feather	*kam[y][ː]R	*kamu	kamil	*kep	*kami	? *karíːm (metathesis)
ear	*kindoːŋg	*kireŋg	siroŋ	*kiroŋg	*kende	*kìroːŋ
eye	*kiː[n/nd][i]	*k[i]ri	sir	*kit	*kin(-jop)	*kìːn
nose	*mitoR	*mete	misol	*m[i]t[o]	*mitu	*mít
tooth	*niːŋgiR		niŋil	*niŋgi	*niŋgi	*níːŋg
tongue	*poːŋg; *pir[a/o]ŋg	*[p]iraŋg	aploŋ	*poŋg	*poŋg	*póːŋg; *piráŋg
foot/leg	*j[aː/oː]n	*jan	jon	*jon	*jon	*jàːn
blood/red	*r[aː/eː]m		lam		*jam	*rèːm
bone	*kundo[ː]R	*kuro	kulol	*koro	*kondo	*kún
skin	*kaːnd	*kat	kal	*kat	*kar	*kàːr
breast	*muːk	*muk	muk	*muk	*muk	*múːk
louse	*kuwimb	*k[uwi]p	sip	*kuwip	*kuwim	*kìm
dog	*ano[ː]n	*anan	anon	*anon	*anon	*majaːn
pig	*kowaŋg	*kuwoŋg	kaŋ	*koŋg	*kowaŋg	*k[àː/òː]ŋg
bird	*n[a/o][ː]r[t]	*no[r]t	nal	*noe	*on	*awɔːn
egg	*windin	*win	wirin	*wirin	*windi	*wín
tree/fire	*andz	*a	a	*a	*ar (? *andz)	*às
man					*ka-tup	
woman	*wVnVŋg		wanaŋ	*kur 'woman/wife'	*w[o]noŋg	*wàn[é/á]ŋg
sun	*at[aː/oː]n	*atan	aton	*at[a/o]n	*aton	*átàːn
moon	*wakor	*ukot	ukol	*ukoe	*w[o]kor	*wàkár
water	*oːk	*ok	ok	*ok	*ok	*òːk
fire/spark	*asi[n/ŋg]	*asin	asiŋg	*asi[n/ŋg]	*awop	*weⁱŋg 'fire'
stone	*tuːm	*tum	tum	*tum	*tum	*túːm
path				*[nd/j][y]jip		*ɾeⁱp
name	*[a]niŋg[o]R; *wini	*iniŋg	niŋil	*wini	*[a]niŋgo	*wín
eat				*en- 'eat/drink'	*ane-	*wan 'eat/drink'
one				*muwim 'one/all'	*mowim	
two					*pajop, *[p]aɾop	*asʉ; *aɾe̞ːp

==== Loughnane and Fedden (2011) ====
Proto-Ok-Oksapmin reconstructions from Loughnane and Fedden (2011):

gloss	proto-Ok-Oksapmin
appetizer	*imin
arrow type	*(w)Vn; *xanaat
ashes	*kip
ask	*daxa
at (place)	*kal
and, with	*soo
bandicoot variety	*kajaal
bat variety	*jVwVm
be, stay	*p(iː); *(i)n
bird-of-paradise	*xoloom
bird variety	*aleem; *ilnem
blood	*xeim
blunt (of e.g. knife)	*fiim
break, dislocate (bone)	*doxo
burn / light fire	*xVl
casuarina tree	*dVtVp
chest (bone)	*tVVb
cockroach	*tanoom
cold	*giil
collar bone	*kʷiŋ
crumbs	*bVVl
cucumber	*kimVd
cut (hair), shave (hair)	*pida-
dirty (of water)	*miim
do / make	*xV-
dog	*mVjaan
domestic pig	*kVŋ
down, below	*daak
dry	*xV(V)x
eagle, eagle variety	*boxVl
emphatic pronoun marker	*-xVp
enemy	*maxaw
enough	*kii
excrement	*Vl
eye	*kiin
fern	*abal
fish	*aniiŋ
frog variety	*siilsiil
fruit	*dVm
garden	*(i)laŋ
greedy, selfish	*ilek
headman, leader	*kVmoxVm
heart	*bVpVl
heavy	*iluum
hornbill	*xawel
house post	*(V)bVk
husk (of nut)	*(w)VVm
in, hole	*tem
itchy	*abaalabaal
kidney	*gV(V)l(V)(p)
knee	*katVVn
kookaburra	*k(V)lVx
light (weight)	*fVVŋ
little finger	*xatxat
magic	*kusem
molar / tooth	*aga(k)
moon	*kajoop
mosquito	*gimgim
name	*win
nasal mucus	*iin
neck, throat	*gʷel
needle	*sVl
nettle variety	*waan
nose	*(mu)duum
no!	*bV(V)s(V)
old	*pVsel
pancreas	*kʷVVn
part of floor	*dixim
penis	*eit
point, tip	*puut
poor	*bVlVp
possum variety	*sopim
pregnant	*gVpVn
pronged bird arrow	*geim
pus	*isax
rain shower	*sox
roundworm	*kasen
salt (traded from Oksapmin)	*eip
same as, like	*tap
seedling / plant / container	*san
sharp	*atVl
fed up with	*gaal
sit with feet and legs together	*goptV(V)
small mammal	*nVVg
snake / snake variety	*inap
sorcery	*kimon
spark	*tVtup
squash	*sof(l)it; *sVko
story	*saŋ
sugarcane	*kʷeit
sun	*ataan
sweet, tasty	*xabaal
taboo	*awem
temporary	*(ka)kuun
thin	*daŋ
tobacco	*suux
tongue	*fV(lV)ŋ
top / bottom of taro	*dVm
trap	*abil
self, reflexive	*xol
urine	*imaan
vein	*mamel
vomit	*usaan
warm	*mVmVn
wasp	*VVm
white cockatoo	*nama
wild pig	*saamVVn
wind	*inim
yellow	*xop; *kitax
child	*mVVn
father.1POSS1	*at(umon)
father.3POSS	*VVlap
in-law.1POSS	*baad
man's sister	*bVVp
uncle.1POSS	*mV(V)m(ein)
younger brother	*VnVVŋ
husband and wife	*agam
mother and children	*Vbdil
