= Oksapmin language =

Trans–New Guinea language spoken in Papua New Guinea

Oksapmin
- Oksap
- nuxule meŋ 'our language'
- Native to: Papua New Guinea
- Region: Oksapmin Rural LLG, Telefomin District, Sandaun
- Native speakers: 12,000 (2005)
- Language family: Trans–New Guinea: Oksapmin
- Dialects: Upper Oksapmin; Lower Oksapmin
- Writing system: Latin

Language codes
- ISO 639-3: opm
- Glottolog: oksa1245
- ELP: Oksapmin
- Map: The Oksapmin language of New Guinea The Oksapmin language Other Trans–New Guinea languages Other Papuan languages Austronesian languages Uninhabited

Oksapmin is a Trans–New Guinea language spoken in Oksapmin Rural LLG, Telefomin District, Sandaun, Papua New Guinea. The two principal dialects are distinct enough to cause some problems with mutual intelligibility.

Oksapmin has dyadic kinship terms and a body-part counting system that goes up to 27. Notable ethnographic research by Geoffrey B. Saxe at UC Berkeley has documented the encounter between pre-contact uses of number and its cultural evolution under conditions of monetization and exposure to schooling and the formal economy among the Oksapmin.

== Classification ==
Oksapmin has been influenced by the Mountain Ok languages (the name "Oksapmin" is from Telefol), and the similarities with those languages were attributed to borrowing in the classifications of both Stephen Wurm (1975) and Malcolm Ross (2005), where Oksapmin was placed as an independent branch of Trans–New Guinea. Loughnane (2009) and Loughnane and Fedden (2011) conclude that it is related to the Ok languages, though those languages share innovative features not found in Oksapmin. Usher finds Oksapmin is not related to the Ok languages specifically, though it is related at some level to the southwestern branches of Trans–New Guinea.

== Phonology ==
=== Vowels ===
There are six monophthongs, /i e ə a o u/, and one diphthong, /ai/.

=== Consonants ===
		Bilabial	Alveolar	Palatal	Velar	
		Bilabial	Alveolar	Palatal	unrounded	rounded
Nasal		m	n		ŋ	
Stop	voiceless		t		k	kʷ
Stop	prenasal	ᵐb	ⁿd		ᵑɡ	ᵑɡʷ
Fricative		ɸ	s		x	xʷ
Lateral			l			
Semivowel				j		w

Phoneme	Allophone
/t/	[t], [tʰ]
/k/	[k], [kʰ]
/ᵐb/	[ᵐb], [m]
/ⁿd/	[ⁿd], [n]
/ᵑɡ/	[ᵑɡ], [ŋ]
/ɸ/	[ɸ], [β], [p], [pɸ~pʰ]
/s/	[s], [z]
/x/	[x], [ɣ], [ç], [ʝ]

=== Tone ===
Oksapmin contrasts two tones: high and low.
