= Central and South New Guinea languages =

Proposed Trans–New Guinea language family

Central and South New Guinea
- Asmat–Ok
- Geographic distribution: Indonesia and Papua New Guinea (New Guinea)
- Linguistic classification: Trans–New Guinea: Central and South New Guinea
- Subdivisions: Asmat–Kamoro; Greater Awyu; Mombum; Ok–Oksapmin; Bayono-Awbono?; Somahai?

Language codes
- ISO 639-3: –
- Glottolog: cent2116
- Map: The Central and South New Guinea languages of New Guinea The Central and South New Guinea languages Other Trans–New Guinea languages Other Papuan languages Austronesian languages Uninhabited

The Central and South New Guinea languages (CSNG) are a proposed family of Trans–New Guinea languages (TNG). They were part of Voorhoeve & McElhanon's original TNG proposal, but have been reduced in scope by half (nine families to four) in the classification of Malcolm Ross. According to Ross, it is not clear if the pronoun similarities between the four remaining branches of Central and South New Guinea are retentions for proto-TNG forms or shared innovations defining a single branch of TNG. Voorhoeve argues independently for an Awyu–Ok relationship, and Foley echoes that Asmat may be closest to Awyu and Ok of the TNG languages. Regardless, the four individual branches of reduced Central and South New Guinea are themselves clearly valid families.

- Central and South New Guinea (Asmat–Ok)
  - Asmat–Kamoro family [a recent expansion along the south coast]
  - Greater Awyu family
  - Mombum family
  - Ok–Oksapmin family

Ethnologue (2009) retains only Awyu–Dumut and Ok, calling the branch Ok–Awyu, and places Asmat and Mombum as independent branches of TNG. Loughnane & Fedden (2011) link Ok to the Oksapmin language. However, van den Heuvel & Fedden (2014) argue that Greater Awyu and Greater Ok are not genetically related, but that their similarities are due to intensive contact.

The Somahai languages and Bayono-Awbono may also belong here, but there is little data to go on.

== History ==
In the mid 1960s, Alan Healey, a colleague of Laycock, noted connections between the Ok, Asmat, and Awyu–Dumut families. Voorhoeve (1968) expanded on this and coined the name CSNG; his proposal added Trans-Fly and Marind to the mix. Collaboration with McElhanon and his Finisterre–Huon family in 1970 found a connection between them, which was named Trans–New Guinea. Wurm's 1975 expansion of TNG also expanded CSNG, with the addition of Awin–Pa, Bosavi, Duna–Pogaya, East Strickland, Mombum, and Momuna. Ross's recension in 2005 retained nothing from Voorhoeve and only Mombum from Wurm, though the Momuna languages were too sparsely attested for him to classify.

== See also ==
- Central West New Guinea languages
