= Indo-Pacific languages =

Rejected language macrofamily

Indo-Pacific
- (Widely rejected)
- Geographic distribution: Oceania, Southeast Asia, South Asia, Australia
- Linguistic classification: Proposed language family
- Subdivisions: Andamanese; Papuan; Tasmanian; Kusunda; Nihali; Vedda (?); various Negrito languages (?)

Language codes
- Glottolog: None

Indo-Pacific is a hypothetical language macrofamily proposed in 1971 by Joseph Greenberg and now believed to be spurious. It grouped together the Papuan languages of New Guinea and Melanesia with the languages of the Andaman Islands (or at least Great Andamanese) and, tentatively, the languages of Tasmania, both of which are remote from New Guinea. The valid cognates Greenberg found turned out to be reflexes of the less extensive Trans–New Guinea family. Recently the Kusunda language (and possibly other unclassificated languages), which is generally seen as a language isolate, is also included in the Indo-Pacific proposal. Greenberg did not include "Australian" in his original 1971 proposal.

== Proposal ==
The Indo-Pacific proposal, grouping the non-Austronesian languages of New Guinea with certain languages spoken on islands to the east and west of New Guinea, was first made by Greenberg in 1971. Greenberg's supporter Merritt Ruhlen considers Indo-Pacific an extremely diverse and ancient family, far older than Austronesian, which reflects a migration from southeast Asia that began only 6,000 years ago; he notes that New Guinea was inhabited by modern humans at least 40,000 years ago, and possibly 10,000 to 15,000 years earlier than that. Luigi Luca Cavalli-Sforza sees Indo-Pacific as a very heterogenous family of 700 languages and suggests that it may be more than 40,000 years old.

== Reception ==
Greenberg's proposal was based on rough estimation of lexical similarity and typological similarity and has not reached a stage where it can be confirmed by the standard comparative method, including the reconstruction of a protolanguage. The languages of Tasmania are extinct and so poorly attested that many historical linguists regard them as unclassifiable. Roger Blench has dismissed the Indo-Pacific proposal as improbable, observing that while it "purported to be a purely linguistic exercise...it conveniently swept up all the languages of the crinklyhaired populations in the region that were not clearly Austronesian." He writes that despite decades of further research into Papuan languages and prehistory, Indo-Pacific is still not accepted by specialists and that it "only exists in the eye of the believer." George van Driem (2001) responds as follows:

Racial notions have continued to be uncritically applied to language groupings. As late as 1971, Joseph Greenberg resurrected the old idea that "the bulk of non-Austronesian languages of Oceania from the Andaman Islands on the west of the Bay of Bengal to Tasmania in the Southeast form a single group of genetically related languages for which the name Indo-Pacific is proposed." This hypothesis is identical to Finck's 1909 family of "Sprachen der ozeanischen Neger", a group for which indeed the name "Indo-Pacific" had already been in use, with its roots in the "Pan-Negrito Theory" of physical anthropologists (cf. Skeat and Blagden 1906: 25–28). Appropriately, Roger Blench has described the Indo-Pacific hypothesis as "essentially a crinkly hair hypothesis". The linguistic evidence which Greenberg adduced for Indo-Pacific is unconvincing, and lexical look-alikes and superficial typological similarities in languages cannot convincingly demonstrate a theory of linguistic relationships conceived solely on the basis of the physical attributes of the speakers.

Since Greenberg's work, the languages of New Guinea have been intensively studied by Stephen Wurm. Wurm's Trans–New Guinea languages family includes about 70 percent of the languages Greenberg included in Indo-Pacific, though the internal classification is entirely different. Wurm states that the lexical similarities between Great Andamanese, West Papuan (which is not part of Trans–New Guinea), and certain languages of Timor "are quite striking and amount to virtual formal identity [...] in a number of instances", but considers this to be due to a linguistic substratum rather than a direct relationship.

Pawley (2008) is the only thorough review of the proposal. He found that all branches of Indo-Pacific except Tasmanian and Andamanese include languages from Trans–New Guinea, and that this explains the more reasonable cognates that Greenberg proposed, but because these Trans–New Guinea languages are mixed in with languages from other families in those branches, cognates linking the branches do not provide support for Greenberg's proposal that all Papuan languages are related.

== Subdivision ==
According to Greenberg, Indo-Pacific consists of fourteen families, not counting a few which he could not classify. He suggested a tentative sub-classification into seven groups, listed in bold below. Some languages have not been identified.

- **Tasmanian**
- Great Andamanese: (Note: Southern Andamanese languages not addressed) Southern: Chariar, Puchikwar, Kede, Kol, Juwoi; Northern: Beada, Bogijiab, Bale, Biada
- **Nuclear**
  - Central
    - Kapauku–Baliem
      - Kapauku (Ekari, Ekagi), Moni, Jabi, Simori, Wolani [= TNG Paniai Lakes family]
      - Dem [= TNG Dem]
      - Uhunduni, Enggipilu [= TNG Uhunduni]
      - Dani (Ndani) [→ Dani]
      - Northern Ngalik, Oeringoep, Sawuri-Hablifuri, Southern Ngalik, Peseghem [= TNG Dani + Isirawa (probably Kwerba)]
    - Highland
      - Wurm & Laycock's Gadsup–Auyana–Awa–Tairoa + Erima, Tsinyaji [= TNG Kainantu + Madang]
      - Wurm & Laycock's Gende–Siane–Gahuku–Kamano–Fore [= TNG Goroka]
      - Wurm & Laycock's Hagen–Wahgi–Jimi–Chumbu [= Chimbu–Wahgi]
      - Wurm & Laycock's Enga–Huli–Pole–Wiru [= Engan + Wiru (probably Teberan–Pawaian)]
      - Karam (Aförö) [= Madang]
      - Kutubu, Fasu [= Kutubuan]
    - McElhanon's Huon languages + Matap, Jupna Valley, Kandomin, Wantoat [= TNG Finisterre–Huon]
  - Northern
    - Murik: Murik, Angoram (Tjimundo), Tshamberi, Kambot
      [= Nor–Pondo + Kambot]
    - Tami: Sko (Seko), Sangke, Arso, Njao, Wembi, Skofro, Ampas, Waris, Vanimo, Kilmeri, Amanab
      [= non-TNG Border + Skou families + unclassified Molof (Cowan's proposal)]
    - Arapeshan: Arapesh, Kombio, Mountain Arapesh, Torricelli, Bambita, Wam, Yambes, Kavu, Valman
      [= non-TNG Torricelli family]
    - Ndu–Kwoma: Mayo, Kwoma, Wongamusin, Iwam + Abau, Laycock's Ndu + "Tombenam", (Note: not the Tombenam in Northeastern) "Malu" (Note: Multitree ID as [mlu] is an error)
      [= non-TNG Sepik family]
    - Sentani: Sentani, Nafri, Tanahmerah, Nimboran, Gresik, Kemtuk, Kuangsu, Waibron Bano-Demenggong, Demta, Mekei, Boven Tor, Kwesten, Mawes, Kaure, Sause
      [= non-TNG Sentani + Nimboran + Tor–Kwerba + (possibly TNG) Kaure families]
    - Monumbo: Monumbo, Lilau, Bosngun, Nubia, Makarob, Igom, Gamai, Watam, Tanggum, Murusapa, Anaberg, Atemble, Gapun
      [= non-TNG Monumbo (branch of Torricelli) + Ramu & Gapun families]
    - Unclassified: Siaute (Olo, Torricelli); Nori (Skou); Apris (Southern Adelbert)
  - Southern (Kiwaiic)
    - Peremka, Bangu, Wandatokwe, Jiminakana, Nausaku, Kebanagara, Mani
      [= non-TNG Tonda family + TNG Suki]
    - Parb, Sanana, (Note: Multitree ID as [szn] is an error) Dungerwab, Dorro, Dapo, Nombuio, Noraia, Potaia, Tunjuamu, Nenium (Wakamara), Karigari, Moi-e
      [= Kunja (Tonda family) + related Nambu + Mekwei (Nimboran family), none TNG]
    - Bugi, (Note: Multitree ID as Bugis is an error) Dabu, Dibolug, Kibuli, Ngamai-iki (Tupadidi), Mbayaka (Jindabira), Agöb
      [= non-TNG Pahoturi family]
    - Jei, Toro, (Note: Supposedly Wartha (Tonda), but the few words do not match.) Ngowugar, (Note: Identified with Biangai (Goilalan family) by Glottolog, but this makes little sense geographically.) Kanum, Moraori, Komelom (Mombum), Koneraw, Kimaghama, Riantana, Keladdar, Teri-Kawalsch, Ndom, Jab (Jelmek), Makleu
      [= non-TNG Morehead & Bulaka River families + TNG Mombum, Kolopom, & Morori families]
    - Kiwai, Ipikoi, Hibaradai, Hiwi, Urama, Iwainu, Goaribari, Kerewa, Turama, Era River, Mawata, Domori, Wabuda, Sisiame, Pirupiru, Dibiri, Karami, Eme-eme (Pepeha), Mahigi, Tureture, Tapapi (Tapari), Buniki
      [= TNG Inland Gulf + possibly TNG Kiwaian + non-TNG Waia]
    - Barika [probably Barikewa], Dugeme, Karima, Foraba, Ro (Keai, Worugi), Sesa, Tumu (Dumu, Kibiri)
      [= TNG Turama–Kikorian family + possibly TNG Folopa]
    - Kunini, Masingara, Oriomo, Jibu, Miriam, Gijara (Note: not Agob, pace Glottolog)
      [= non-TNG Eastern Trans-Fly family]
  - Southwestern (Marind–Ok)
    - Awju: Awju Sjiagha, Awju Jenimu (Oser), Awju Pisa [= TNG Awyu–Dumut family]
    - Kukukuku: Kukukuku, Ashavi, Madinava [= TNG Angan]
    - Tirio: Tirio, Tagota, Pisirami, Arama, Anima [= TNG Tirio family]
    - Ok [= TNG Ok + Awin–Pa + Awyu–Dumut families]
      - Digul, Aran, Niinati, Metomka, Lower Muiu, Muju, Kandam, Iongom, Upper Tedi, Awin, Eastern Tedi, Western Donaldson, Upper Fly, Upper Muju, Marapka
      - Telefol, Unkia, "Plain Country" [= Awin]
      - Mandobo, Dumut, Kaeti, Wambon
    - Marind [= TNG Marind + perhaps non-TNG Bulaka River families (Note: Jabga is not Marind, but no words from it appear in Greenberg's proposal.)]
      - Marind (Tugeri, incl. Gawir & Boven Mbian)
      - Jaqai, Sohur
      - Boazi, Dea, Konmak (village Y), Lake Murray, Jabga, Babwa (village Z), Gabgab, Biak (village X) (Note: Multitree ID as [bhu] is an error)
- **West**
  - Western
    - Yava (Mantembu & Saweroe) [= non-TNG, possible isolate]
    - Kapaur (Iha), Baham (Patimuni), Karas [= TNG West Bomberai family]
    - Ajamaru, Asli-Sidi, Maibrat, Aitinjo [= non-TNG Mai Brat family]
    - Madik, Karon, Waipu, Moi, Seget, Kalabra, Moraid, Tehit, Waliem [= non-TNG Bird's Head family]
    - Meninggo (Meax), Mansibaber, Manikion, Mantion, Amberbaken, Faranjao, Mairasi, Etna Bay, Mogetemin [misidentified], (Note: The name Mogetemin is used for both Maibrat and Konda (Ogit). Archived 2012-10-17 at the Wayback Machine The vocabulary in Greenberg is clearly Maibrat, but the placement here looks to be an inherited classification for Konda.) Konda, Jahadian, Puragi, Kampong-Baru, Solowat, Itigo, Bira, Najarago, Tarof, Barau, Arandai, Mor
      [= non-TNG East Bird's Head + Amberbaken + Mairasi families + Maibrat (spurious) + TNG South Bird's Head + Mor families]
  - North Halmahera: Loda, Tobelo, Tabaru, Isam, Pagu, Tololiku, Wai (Waioli), Sau, Modole, Galela, Ternate, Tidore
    [= non-TNG North Halmahera family]
  - Timor–Alor: Bunak, Abui, Makasai, Oirata
    [= TNG Timorese languages]
- **Eastern**
  - Afoa: Afoa, Tauata, Goilala, Ambo, Deba (Note: Multitree ID as Yidiny an error)
    [= Goilalan family]
  - Kovio: Kovio, Kuepa, Oru-Lopiko, Kunimaipa, Sini, Biaru, Goiefu
    [= Goilalan family]
  - Fuyuge: Fuyuge (Mafulu), Kambesi (Tauada), Sikube (Kambana), Korona, Onunge, Agita, Vovoi, Gomali
    [= Goilalan family]
  - Koita: Biagi, Uabari, Iarumi, Karukaru, Mogoni, Agi, Isurara [typo for Isurava], Suku (Amaseba), Minjori, Kagi, Favele, Wowonga, Kokila, Eikiri, Koiari, Uberi, Koita, Iworo, Maiari, Gosisi (Tobiri), Itu, (Note: Multitree ID as Hitu an error) Hagari, Neneba, Barai (Managalaski), Seramina, Suambe [= Numba], Wamai, Nigubaiba, Kotoi
    [= Koiarian + Manubaran families]
  - Mailu: Mailu (Magi), Domara, Nemea, Dom (Domu), Merani, Morawa, Magori, Binahari, Monomor, (Note: Multitree ID as Nalca is an error) Keveri, Moikoidi, Bauwaki, Kororo, Neme, Boli, Doriaidi, Buari, Okaudi, Bori, Saroa, Yabura, Avini, Lauwa, O'oku, Lauuna, Gebi, Orai-iu
    [= Mailuan + Manubaran + Yareban families, maybe Baruga, and crypto-Austronesian Magori & Keapara]
  - Elema: Elema (Haira), Kairi-Kaura, Uaripi, Toaripi (Motumotu), Milareipi, Orokolo
    [= Eleman family]
  - Dimuga: Dimuga (Nawp), Tevi, Kanamara, Gwoiden, Makiara
    [= Dagan family]
  - Binandere: Binandere, Mambare [ambiguous], Musa River, Aiga, Yoda [Yǒda/Koriri, geographically Hunjara], Berepo [presumably Binandere], Amara [presumably Binandere], Adaua [possibly Baruga], Yema-Yarawa, Mawai, Yega, Tain-Daware, Jegasa-Sarau, Jauwa (Dobodura), Hunjara, Tsia, Giumu, Tahari (incl. Aru & Duvera dialects), Maiheari, Upper Musa, Bargua, Totore
    [= Binanderean family + Akoye]
  - Mulaha: Mulaha (Iaibu), Manukolu (Lakume), Garia, Kwale
    [= Kwalean family]
  - Namau (Maipua) [an isolate, perhaps Eleman]
- **Northeast** (Madang): Langtub, Panim, Mis, Bongu, Gorendu, Bogadjim, Sungumana (Sungum), Wuong, Wenke, Uom, Jimjam [geographically Anjam], (Note: Identified with Jimajima (Dagan family) by Glottolog, but this contradicts the location in Ray.) Burumana, Koliku, Kaliko, Male, Damun, Shongu, Banara (Moando), Tombenam (also in Ndu), Dagoi, Bonaputa-Mapu, Bunubun, Ulingan, Vanembere, Bunu (Saker), Rempin (A'e), Englam, Em, Ate, Kemba, Bawaipa, Misdao, Maragum, Nupanob (Botelkude), Matepi
  [= Madang family]
- **Pacific**
  - Bougainville
    - Uasi [isolate]
    - KKRE: Rotokas, Konua, Eivo, Keriaka [= North Bougainville family]
    - NNSB: Buin, NKK (Nasioi, Koianu, Koromira), STB (Telei, Siwai, Baitsi) [= South Bougainville family]
  - New Britain
    - Sulka [unclassified]
    - Idne [AN]
    - New Ireland: Letatan–Limalua, Panaras [isolate]
    - Baining
    - Taulil–Butam [= Baining family]
  - Central Melanesian
    - Central Solomons: Bilua, Baniata, Laumbe, Savo [= Central Solomons family]
    - Santa Cruz: Reef, Ndeni (Noole, Banua, Nea, Nabalue) [= AN]

The following were left unclassified:

- [various languages suspected to be in Northern]: Senagi & Komberatoro; Busa; Urim; Kwanga (Kwanga); Yuri; Fas; Amto
  [= Senagi, Torricelli, Sepik, Pauwasi, Fas, Amto–Musan, and Busa families]
- Arare [possibly Western] [= TNG Kayagar]
- Kamoro [possibly Western]: Kajakaja, Asmat, Mimika, Asienara, Nagramandu, Sempan, Kamoro, Iria, Angandi
  [= TNG Asmat–Kamoro family]
- Tori [possibly Western]: "South River" (Südfluss) [likely Duvle], Tori, Pauwi II, Tori Aikwakai, Sidjuai, Pauwi I, Borumessu
  [= Lakes Plain family + Yoke + Burmeso]
- Kauwerawet: Kauwerawet, Koassa [= Kwerba family]
- Gogodala [probably in Southern New Guinea]: Gogodala, Gaima, Waruna, Adiba, Girara
  [= TNG Gogodala family]
- Tanahmerah [TNG]; Rossel Island [isolate]; Aurama–Huaruha [possibly TNG]; Mumeng I–Mumeng II [AN]; Tate [TNG Eleman]; "Williams River" [evidently Weri: Goilalan, possibly TNG]; Ondoro [TNG Koiarian]

=== Comparison ===
This classification was never widely accepted, and was largely passed over for that of Stephen Wurm. They do not agree well. For example,

- Greenberg's North New Guinea family corresponds to four of Wurm's families: Sko, Sepik–Ramu, Torricelli, and the Northern branch of Trans–New Guinea;
- Greenberg's West New Guinea family corresponds to four of Wurm's: East Bird's Head, Geelvink Bay, the South Bird's Head and West Bomberai branches of Trans–New Guinea, and the Bird's Head branch of West Papuan.

The few similarities are retentions from earlier linguists' work:

- Greenberg's Northeast New Guinea family and Wurm's Madang–Adelbert Range branch of Trans–New Guinea reflect John Z'graggen's Madang–Adelbert Range,
- Greenberg's Eastern New Guinea family and Wurm's Eastern Main-Section branch of Trans–New Guinea both preserve Tom Dutton's Southeast New Guinea family.
