= Gogodala =

Gogodala may refer to:

- Gogodala people, a people of Papua New Guinea
- Gogodala languages or Gogodala–Suki languages, Papuan languages
  - Gogodala language
- Gogodala Rural LLG, Papua New Guinea
