= Kerema =

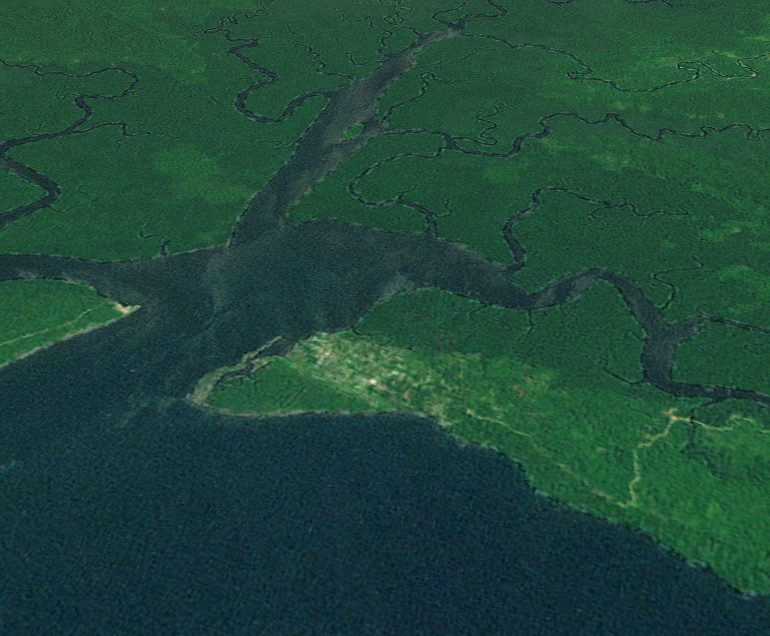
- Satellite image

- Location within Gulf Province
- Coordinates: 7°58′S 145°46′E
- Country: Papua New Guinea
- Province: Gulf Province
- District: Kerema District
- LLG: Kerema Urban LLG
- Elevation: 6 m (20 ft)

Population (2013)
  - Total: 6,551
  - Rank: 25th

Languages
  - Main languages: Kakiae, Opao, Keuru, Tairuma, Toaripi
- Time zone: UTC+10 (AEST)
- Postcode: 311
- Location: 229 km (142 mi) NW of Port Moresby
- Climate: Af

Kerema is the capital of Gulf Province, Papua New Guinea. It is located on the coast of Gulf of Papua. The Gulf region is aptly named for its concave coastline with large deltas. The Gulf area is a riparian region where many rivers from the southern slopes of the highlands drain into.

== Culture and tradition ==
There are more than twenty languages spoken in Gulf Province. Languages spoken in the Kerema area include Toaripi, Kakiae, Opae, Moivo Hivi and Tairuma. The villages towards the east of Kerema from Hamuhamu, Miaru to Iokea and inland to Moveave all speak Toaripi. The Gulf's traditional culture and knowledge was one of the first to be exposed to the outside world. Thus it was one of the first cultures to change, as outsiders, mainly Christian missionaries have visited many of the coastal people and encouraged them to abandon much of their native culture.

== History ==
James Chalmers, or 'Tamate' as the locals of Toaripi called him, was the first white man to land in the province. He first landed in Iokea in 1885.

== Industry ==
The Gulf area is blessed with many natural resources such as abundant marine life, rich jungle, sago, betelnut (buai), and many others. Rubber plantations were established in the 1930s, mainly by Australians. Currently oil and gas explorations are showing positive results and it will be major income earner to the province. The Interoil Gas Field has proven huge reserves. Fishing, logging and oil are the main industries, although betelnut and sago are the major cash crop for the local people. Gulf people supply 15% of the betelnut and sago to Port Moresby markets for cash.

== Climate ==
Kerema has a tropical rainforest climate (Köppen Af) with heavy rainfall year-round.

Climate data for Kerema
Month	Jan	Feb	Mar	Apr	May	Jun	Jul	Aug	Sep	Oct	Nov	Dec	Year
Mean daily maximum °C (°F)	31.6 (88.9)	31.5 (88.7)	31.3 (88.3)	30.9 (87.6)	30.1 (86.2)	29.0 (84.2)	28.2 (82.8)	28.3 (82.9)	29.0 (84.2)	29.9 (85.8)	31.0 (87.8)	31.5 (88.7)	30.2 (86.3)
Daily mean °C (°F)	27.3 (81.1)	27.3 (81.1)	27.2 (81.0)	26.9 (80.4)	26.6 (79.9)	25.7 (78.3)	25.1 (77.2)	25.0 (77.0)	25.6 (78.1)	26.3 (79.3)	26.8 (80.2)	27.2 (81.0)	26.4 (79.6)
Mean daily minimum °C (°F)	23.0 (73.4)	23.1 (73.6)	23.1 (73.6)	22.9 (73.2)	23.1 (73.6)	22.4 (72.3)	22.0 (71.6)	21.8 (71.2)	22.3 (72.1)	22.7 (72.9)	22.7 (72.9)	23.0 (73.4)	22.7 (72.8)
Average rainfall mm (inches)	228 (9.0)	232 (9.1)	260 (10.2)	260 (10.2)	437 (17.2)	383 (15.1)	329 (13.0)	282 (11.1)	289 (11.4)	279 (11.0)	188 (7.4)	217 (8.5)	3,384 (133.2)
