= TQO =

TQO may refer to:

- Thiosulfate dehydrogenase (quinone), an enzyme
- Toaripi language of Papua New Guinea (ISO 639-3 code: tqo)
- The Queensland Orchestra, now Queensland Symphony Orchestra, in Australia
- Tulum International Airport in Mexico
