= Kerema language =

Kerema may be

- Tairuma language
- Nisa language
