= Bauzi =

Bauzi may refer to:

- Bauzi people, a people of the Indonesian province of Papua
- Bauzi language, the language of the Bauzi people
