= Tirio language =

Tirio language may refer to:

- Tiriyó language (Brazil)
- Tirio language (New Guinea) (New Guinea)
- Auyokawa (Nigeria), also called Tirio

== See also ==
- Tirio languages, a family of Trans–New Guinea languages
