= WRV =

WRV or wrv may refer to:

- Waruna language (ISO 639-3: wrv), a Papuan language of the New Guinea
- Wildlands Restoration Volunteers, an American non-profit volunteer-centered organization that organizes high-quality ecological restoration projects on public lands
