= Orokolo language =

Trans–New Guinea language spoken in Papua New Guinea

Orokolo
- Native to: Papua New Guinea
- Region: Ihu Rural LLG, Gulf Province
- Native speakers: (7,500 cited 1986)
- Language family: Trans–New Guinea: Eleman; nuclear Eleman; Western; Orokolo

Language codes
- ISO 639-3: oro
- Glottolog: orok1267

Orokolo is a Trans–New Guinea language of the Eleman branch spoken in Ihu Rural LLG, Gulf Province, Papua New Guinea by about 50,000 people (2010). Alternate names are Bailala, Haira, Kaipi, Kairu-Kaura, Muro, Muru, Vailala, and West Elema. It is spoken in various villages, including Vailala (7.945571°S 145.427676°E). It is notable for having a very small consonant inventory.

== Literature ==
This first New Testament (Pupu Oharo Āre) was translated by the Rev. S. H. Dewdney, a Congregational missionary with the London Missionary Society, and Lavako Maika, an evangelist. It was published by the British and Foreign Bible Society in 1963. Genesis, called Genese, was published by the British and Foreign Bible Society in Australia in 1970. Ruth, called Rute, was published by the Bible Society in Australia, in 1972.

== Phonology ==
Orokolo has six consonant phonemes.

Orokolo consonant phonemes
	Bilabial	Alveolar	Velar	Glottal
Obstruent	p	t	k	
Continuant	m	l		h

/m l/ are nasal [m n] word-initially and oral [β l] intervocalically. The alveolar plosive /t/ is about 10 times rarer than it is in the related language Toaripi. Most instances of historical /t/ shifted to /k/ in Orokolo, as shown by the cognates below. The exception to this is when */t/ followed /i/ and preceded /a/, in which case it was retained in Orokolo and the Sepoe dialect of Toaripi, but shifted to /s/ in Toaripi proper.

Orokolo	Toaripi	Sepoe	English
/uki/	/uti/		"bone"
/keke/	/tete/		"fishscale"
/kukululu/	/tutululu/		"thundering"
/harita/	/farisa/	/farita/	"arrow"
/haita/	/saesa/	/saita/	"dish"

However, since original /k/ still appears in this position (e.g. /heaikapo/ "long"), /t/ and /k/ are distinct phonemes and not allophones. The other major sound change which characterises Orokolo is the shift of */f/ and */s/ to /h/, reducing the fricative inventory to one member; compare for instance Orokolo /hapa/ "open" and /ahe/ "sugarcane" with Toaripi /fapai/, /ase/.

Orokolo also has six vowels, giving it an unusually low consonant-vowel ratio of 1.

Orokolo vowel phonemes
	Front	Central	Back
Close	i		u
Close-mid	e		o
Open-mid	e		ɔ
Open		a	

/a/ may be pronounced as [ə] when preceding a long stressed vowel. In other unstressed positions, it can be pronounced as [æ].

/o/ and /ɔ/ are not distinguished orthographically, both being written <o>.
