= Maiwa language =

Maiwa language may refer to:

- Maiwa language (Papuan)
- Maiwa language (Sulawesi)
