= GGW =

GGW may refer to:

- Girls Gone Wild (franchise), an adult entertainment company
- Glasgow station (Montana), a train station
- Glasgow Airport (Montana)
- Gogodala language
- Great Green Wall (Africa)
- Great Green Wall (China)
