= AOB =

AOB may refer to:

- Accessory olfactory bulb, the dorsal-posterior region of the main olfactory bulb
- Ace of Base, a Swedish pop group
- Ammonia-oxidizing bacteria, a type of nitrifying bacteria
- Angle of bank, in aviation
- Angle On the Bow, a variable in nautical rangekeeping
- open bite, in dentistry
- Antioxidant of bamboo leaves
- Antyfaszystowska Organizacja Bojowa
- Assignment of Benefits, healthcare terminology
- Any Other Business, an agenda item for free miscellaneous points
- Austin O'Brien Catholic High School, a Catholic Senior High School in Edmonton, Alberta, Canada
- Atomic Ownership Blockchains, blockchain technology

AoB may refer to:

- Array of Bytes

aob may refer to:

- Abom language, a nearly extinct language spoken in Papua New Guinea (ISO 639-3 code)
