= Demisa =

Demisa may be,

- Demisa language
- Shure Demisa
