= Wamai language =

Wamai language may be:

- A dialect of the Ashkun language, a language spoken in Afghanistan
- Mountain Koiali language, a language spoken in Papua New Guinea
