= Toaripi =

Toaripi may be,

- Toaripi language
- Toaripi Lauti
