= Maiari =

Maiari may refer to:

- Maiani language, a Papuan language complex of Madang Province, Papua New Guinea, of which the northern and southern varieties appear to be distinct languages
- Favele language, also known as Grass Koiari or Koiali, a language of Papua New Guinea
