= Kunja language =

Kunja may be:

- Kunja language (Papuan)
- Kunja language (Australian)
