= Bongu =

Bongu may refer to:

- Bongu language, a Rai Coast language spoken in Madang Province, Papua New Guinea
- Bongu, tribe in Zungeru, Nigeria
- Bongu (film), 2017 Tamil film
