= Keveri =

Keveri may refer to either of two Papuan languages of New Guinea:

- Bauwaki language
- Nawaru language
