= Tagota language =

Tagota may be:

- A dialect of the Meriam language, the language of the people of the small islands of Mer (Murray Island), Waier and Dauar, Erub (Darnley Island), and Ugar (Stephens Island) in the eastern Torres Strait, Queensland, Australia; the only Papuan language on Australian territory
- The Were language or Kiunum, a Papuan language of Papua New Guinea
