= Maragum language =

Maragum may refer to either of two languages of Papua New Guinea:

- Mara-Gomu language
- Maragam language
