= Sona language =

Sona may refer to:

- Sona language (Papua New Guinea)
- Sona (constructed language)
