= Mailuan languages =

Language family of New Guinea

Mailuan
- Cloudy Bay
- Geographic distribution: Southeastern peninsula of Papua New Guinea: Central Province
- Linguistic classification: Trans–New Guinea: Papuan Peninsula; Owen Stanley Range; Mailu–Yareban; Mailuan

Language codes
- Glottolog: mail1249

The Mailuan or Cloudy Bay languages are a small family of Trans–New Guinea languages spoken around Cloudy Bay in the "Bird's Tail" (southeastern peninsula) of New Guinea. They are classified within the Southeast Papuan branch of Trans–New Guinea.

== Languages ==
The languages, which all share about half of their vocabulary, are,

- Domu, Binahari–Binahari-Ma, Morawa, Mailu (Magi), Laua

Bauwaki–O'oku is closely related to the Mailuan languages.

== Classification ==
Dutton (1971) said Bauwaki was a link to the Yareban languages. It has greater lexical similarity with Aneme Wake (Yareban) than the closest Mailuan language, Domu. Usher (2020) classifies Mailuan, Bauwaki and Yareban together.

Magi shows evidence of language shift from an Oceanic language in many Oceanic words.

== Pronouns ==
Usher (2020) reconstructs the proto-Mailuan–Yareban pronouns as:

	sg	du	pl
1excl	*na		*ge
1incl	*na	*gu	*i
2	*ga		*ja
3	*e		*ema

Ross (1995) reconstructs the Mailuan pronouns as:

	sg	du	pl
1	*i	*gu-	*ge
2	*ga	*[j]a	*[j]a, *mee
3		*emu	

== Vocabulary comparison ==
The following basic vocabulary words are from Thomson (1975) and various SIL field notes, as cited in the Trans-New Guinea database.

The words cited constitute translation equivalents, whether they are cognate (e.g. kuma, uma, tuma for “louse”) or not (e.g. baka, ulim, muruu for “egg”).

gloss	Bauwaki	Binahari	Mailu	Mailu (Delebai d.)	Mailu (Asiaoro d.)	Mailu (Baibara d.)	Mailu (Geagea d.)	Mailu (Ilai d.)	Mailu (Domara d.)	Morawa
head	awara	sol	moru; uru	moru	moru	moru	ioru	ilolo	moru	din
hair	i'iri	git	limuu	ʔuru	liʔimu	limuʔu	ʔuru	liʔimu	ʔuru	bo
ear	ome	ofi	ope	ʔope	ʔope	ʔope	ʔope	ʔope	ʔope	ope
eye	ni'aba	ni	ini	ini	ini	ini	ini	ini	ini	nikaba
nose	iru	lilim	durumu	durumu	durumu	durumu	durumu	durumu	durumu	dunun
tooth	ni'o	maʔa	gagina; maa	maʔa	maʔa	maʔa	maʔa	maʔa	maʔa	ma'akisa
tongue	meana	koba	goba	goba	goba	goba	goba	goba	goba	goba
leg	doboro	aᵘ		ʔau	ʔau	ʔau	ʔau	ʔau	ʔau	au
louse	kuma	uma	tuma	tuma	tuma	tuma	tuma	tuma	tuma	tuma
dog	wa'ai	waʔaⁱ	waai	waʔai	dari	waʔai	dari	dari	dari	va'ai
pig	boro	boro		boraʔa	boraʔa	boraʔa	boraʔa	talae	natu	
bird	adau	adaᵘ	manu	manu	manu	manu	manu	manu	manu	adau
egg	baka	ulim	muruu	muruʔu	muruʔu	muruʔu	muruʔu	muruʔu	muruʔu	unimi
blood	dana	lala	lala	lala	lala			lala	lala	
bone	i sa	gisa	kisa	kisa	tara	kisa	kisa	kisa	iriga	
skin	ofe	ofi	opi	ʔopi	ʔopi	ʔopi	ʔopi	ʔopi	ʔopi	ubu
breast	ama	ⁱama	hama	ama	ama	ama	ama	ama	ama	ama
tree	ana	ʔana		ana	ana	ana	ana	ana	ana	ana
man	eme	ɛmɛkʰ	egi	egi	egi	egi	egi	egi	egi	emegi
woman	aveka	aveha		avesa	avesa	avesa	avesa	avesa	avesa	aveha
sky			nogara	nogara	nogara	nogara	nogara	nogara	nogara	
sun	evaka	budiwa		nina	nina	nina	nina	nina	nina	rina
moon	manabe	debaʔaʰ	dovele		dovele		dovele	dovele	dovele	deveni
water	ya'a	yaʔah	aʔaʔma; mami	ʔaʔama	ʔaʔama	ʔaʔama	ʔaʔama	ʔaʔama	ʔaʔama	ya'ama
fire	yo	kɛu	eu	eu	eu	eu	eu	eu	badau	eu
stone	oma	bagᵃ	budi; nabua; gomagomana	gomana		gomana	gomana	gomana	korau	korao
road, path	da'aba	legaʰ	laea	laea	laea	laea	laea	laea	laea	nara
name	ibi	im	omu	omu	omu	omu	omu	omu	omu	
eat	isi	kihi	isiisi	isiisi	isiisi	isiisi	isiisi	isiisi	ʔiʔa	isi
one	dim dai	opmigau	omu	ʔomu	ʔomu	ʔomu	ʔomu	ʔomu	ʔomu	obumiya
two	yara	haᵘřa	ava	ʔava	ʔava	ʔava	ʔava	ʔava	ʔava	hauna

Additional word lists can be found in Ray (1938).

== Evolution ==
Mailuan reflexes of proto-Trans-New Guinea (pTNG) etyma are:

Mailu language:

- ama ‘breast’ < *amu
- maa ‘mouth’ < *maŋgat[a]
- kisa ‘bone’ < *kondaC
- tupa ‘short’ < *tu(p,mb)a(C)
- guia ‘cassowary’ < *ku(y)a

Bauwaki language:

- baba ‘father’ < *mbapa
- idi ‘hair’ < *iti[C]
- (ine) ibi ‘name’ < *imbi
- iini- ‘sleep’ < *kin(i,u)-
