= Sanana language =

Sanana may be:

- Kunja language (Papuan)
- Sula language
