= Rabaraba =

- Location within Papua New Guinea
- Coordinates: 9°58′4″S 149°50′9″E
- Country: Papua New Guinea
- Province: Milne Bay Province

Languages
  - Main languages: Dagan languages
- Time zone: UTC+10 (AEST)

Rabaraba is a coastal village in Milne Bay Province on the southeastern coast of Papua New Guinea. It overlooks Goodenough Bay, and the Uga River flows into the bay to the south of the village.

== History ==
In Papua mythology, Rabaraba was a feather with magical powers. The name means "far, far away".

Rabaraba and the surrounding area was affected by Cyclone Guba in November 2007, which caused flooding, destroying about 30 houses and forcing over 100 people to evacuate their homes.

== Demographics ==
Eight Dagan languages, classified as non-Austronesian, are spoken in the mountains of the region. The largest is the Gwedena language, which was spoken by about 2100 people in 1990.

== Economy ==
Agriculture is predominant in the area, with Rabaraba being well irrigated. large alluvial fans along streams divert the water into ditches. The locals around Milne Bay are adept at woodcarving, with abstract designs of birds particularly common.

Milne Bay Highway, connecting Rabaraba with Alotau, Dogura, and Agaun commenced construction in April 1973. By the end of 1973, 11 kilometres (6.8 mi) of the road had been built in the northwest around Giligili.

== Landmarks ==
A rural health centre was in place in Rabaraba by the mid 1960s. The village is served by Rabaraba Airport, which offers flights to Gurney.
