= Musa River language =

Musa River may refer to either of two languages of Papua New Guinea:

- Yareba language
- Baruga language
