= SNX =

SNX or snx may refer to:

- SNX, the IATA code for Semnan Municipal Airport, Iran
- SNX, the NYSE symbol for TD Synnex, an American IT distribution company
- snx, the ISO 639-3 code for Sam language, Papua New Guinea
