= Eleman languages =

Language family of Papua New Guinea

Eleman
- Kaki Ae – Kerema Bay
- Geographic distribution: Kerema Bay, Papua New Guinea
- Linguistic classification: a primary language family
- Subdivisions: Eleman proper; Kaki Ae

Language codes
- Glottolog: nucl1580 (Eleman proper)
- Map: The Eleman languages of New Guinea The Eleman languages Trans–New Guinea languages Other Papuan languages Austronesian languages Uninhabited

The Eleman languages are a family spoken around Kerema Bay, Papua New Guinea.

== Languages and classification ==
The five languages of Eleman proper are clearly related. They were identified as a family by Sidney Herbert Ray in 1907, and would later be incorporated in the Trans–New Guinea classifications of Stephen Wurm (1975) and of Malcolm Ross (2005).

- ? Kaki Ae (Tate)
- Eleman family
  - West: Keuru, Opao, Orokolo
  - East: Toaripi, Tairuma (Uaripi)

Purari was included by Brown (1968), but the only evidence is the 1sg pronoun nai, which might simply be a reflection of TNG *na.

The purported evidence for including Eleman in the Trans–New Guinea family lies in Kaki Ae. Franklin (1995) shows regular sound correspondences between Kaki Ae and Eleman, including Kaki Ae n to Eleman *r, so Kaki Ae nao 1sg appears to be cognate with Eleman *ara, both perhaps descending from proto-TNG *na. Likewise, Kaki Ae nu'u may reflect pTNG *nu, and the forms of the 2sg pronouns, ao and *a, are common in TNG languages.

Ross states that the Kaki Ae isolate links Eleman proper within TNG. However, Glottolog notes that the sound correspondences are just what one would expect from loans, given the different phonologies of the languages: Eleman has no n/l/r distinction, and Kaki Ae has no t/k distinction.

Pawley and Hammarström (2018) classify Kaki Ae as a language isolate rather than as part of Eleman, noting that similarities with Eleman are mostly because of borrowing.

== Pronouns ==
The pronouns are as follows:

Eleman proper
	sg	pl
1	*ara	*ela
2	*a	*e(u)
3	*are	*ere(u)

Kaki Ae
	sg	pl
1	nao	nu'u
2	ao	ofe
3	era	era-he
