= Kaki Ae language =

Language isolate of Papua New Guinea

Kaki Ae
- Tate
- Region: New Guinea
- Ethnicity: 660 ethnic population (2015)
- Native speakers: 630 (2015)
- Language family: language isolate or Eleman: Kaki Ae

Language codes
- ISO 639-3: tbd
- Glottolog: kaki1249
- ELP: Kaki Ae
- Kaki Ae is classified as Vulnerable by the UNESCO Atlas of the World's Languages in Danger.

Kaki Ae, or Tate, is a language spoken by about 500 people, half the ethnic population, near Kerema, in Papua New Guinea. It was previously known by the foreign designation Raeta Tati.

== Classification ==
Kaki Ae has been proposed to be related to the Eleman languages, but the connections appear to be loans. Søren Wichmann (2013) tentatively considers it to be a separate, independent group. Pawley and Hammarström (2018) treat Kaki Ae as a language isolate due to low cognacy rates with Eleman, and consider the few similarities shared with Eleman to be due to borrowed loanwords.

== Distribution ==
Kaki Ae is spoken in Auri, Kupiano, Kupla (7.990545°S 145.790882°E), Lou (8.015988°S 145.813268°E), Ovorio (7.987255°S 145.809446°E), and Uriri (7.978345°S 145.794638°E) villages in Central Kerema Rural LLG, Gulf Province.

== Pronouns ==
The Kaki Ae pronouns are:

	sg	pl
1	nao	nu'u
2	ao	ofe
3	era	era-he

== Phonology ==
Consonants
	Labial	Alveolar	Velar	Glottal
Plosive	p		k	ʔ
Nasal	m	n		
Fricative	f v	s		h
Approximant	w	l		

Kaki Ae has no distinction between /t/ and /k/. (The forms kaki and tate of the name both derive from the rather pejorative Toaripi name for the people, Tati.)

Vowels
	Front	Central	Back
High	i ĩ		u ũ
Mid	e ẽ		o õ
Low		a ã	

== Vocabulary ==
The following basic vocabulary words are from Brown (1973), as cited in the Trans-New Guinea database:

gloss	Kaki Ae
head	aro
hair	uʔumo
ear	oʔi
eye	ere
nose	noʔi
tooth	huʔu
tongue	anara
leg	fera
louse	saruta
dog	evera
bird	mini
egg	mini umu
blood	ivare
bone	uki
breast	ame
tree	oproro
man	aru
woman	aʔu
sun	lare
moon	fuiya
water	haime
fire	aiyeʔi
stone	ere
name	iru
eat	muake
one	okiao
two	uʔungka
