= Tarunggare language =

East Geelvink Bay language spoken in Indonesia

Tarunggare
- Native to: Indonesia
- Region: Papua
- Native speakers: (500 cited 1993)
- Language family: East Geelvink Bay: Tarunggare

Language codes
- ISO 639-3: trt
- Glottolog: tung1293

Tarunggare (also called Tunggare, Tarunggareh, Turunggare) is a language spoken in Papua, Indonesia. Wate is a dialect.
