= Ari language (New Guinea) =

Gogodala language of Papua New Guinea

Ari
- Native to: Papua New Guinea
- Region: Ari and Serea villages, Aramia River area, Western Province.
- Native speakers: (50 cited 2000)
- Language family: Papuan Gulf ?: Gogodala–Suki; Gogodala; Ari

Language codes
- ISO 639-3: aac
- Glottolog: arii1243
- ELP: Ari
- Ari is classified as Severely Endangered by the UNESCO Atlas of the World's Languages in Danger.
- Coordinates: 7°57′S 142°24′E

The Ari language is a Papuan language of the Trans–New Guinea family. According to the 2000 census, there were only 50 Ari speakers, living in the two villages of Ari and Serea in Gogodala Rural LLG.

The language that most resembles Ari is the Gogodala language.

== Phonology ==
Consonant sounds
		Labial	Alveolar	Velar
Plosive	voiceless	p	t	k
Plosive	voiced	b	d	g
Plosive	prenasal	ᵐb	ⁿd	ᵑɡ
Nasal		m	n	
Fricative			s	
Rhotic			ɾ	
Glide		w		j

Vowel sounds
	Front	Central	Back
High	i		u
Mid	e		o
Mid	ɛ		ɔ
Low		a	

== Sources ==
- Reesink, Ger P. 1976. Languages of the Aramia River area. In: Ger P. Reesink, L. Fleischmann, S. Turpeinen, Peter Lincoln. (eds.), Papers in New Guinea Linguistics No. 19, 1–37. Canberra: Pacific Linguistics.
- Pawley, Andrew; Hammarström, Harald (2017-12-04), "The Trans New Guinea family", in Palmer, Bill (ed.), The Languages and Linguistics of the New Guinea Area, De Gruyter, ISBN 978-3-11-029525-2
