= Central Kerema Rural LLG =

Local-level government in Papua New Guinea

- Country: Papua New Guinea
- Province: Gulf Province
- Time zone: UTC+10 (AEST)

Central Kerema Rural LLG is a local-level government (LLG) of Gulf Province, Papua New Guinea.

== Wards ==
- 01. Uaripi (Tairuma language speakers)
- 02. Mei'i
- 03. Lapari
- 04. Mirakere
- 05. Didimaua
- 06. Uriri (Kaki Ae language speakers)
- 07. Silo
- 08. Uamai No. 1
- 09. Uamai No. 2
- 10. Karama
- 11. Pukari
- 12. Koaru
- 13. Meporo
- 14. Mamavu
