= Tefaro language =

Papuan language spoken in Indonesia

Tefaro
- Native to: Indonesia
- Region: Demba District, Waropen Regency, Papua
- Native speakers: (100 cited 1987)
- Language family: East Geelvink Bay?: Tefaro

Language codes
- ISO 639-3: tfo
- Glottolog: tefa1238
- ELP: Tefaro
- Coordinates: 2.35042°S 136.753°E

Tefaro is a Papuan language of the Indonesian province of Papua, on the eastern shore of Cenderawasih Bay. It is spoken in Demba and Tefaro villages of Waropen Regency.

Tefaro is lexically similar to the East Geelvink Bay languages and presumably belongs in that family, but is too poorly attested to be sure.
