= Mindjim languages =

Central Madang languages of Papua New Guinea

Mindjim
- Mindjim River
- Geographic distribution: Mindjim River, Papua New Guinea
- Linguistic classification: Madang: Central Madang; Mindjim

Language codes
- Glottolog: mind1258

The Mindjim languages are a small family of closely related languages spoken in the Mindjim River area of Papua New Guinea. They were linked with the Rai Coast languages in 1951 by Arthur Capell in his Madang family, but separated out again by Timothy Usher.

== Languages ==
The languages are,

- Anjam (Bom)
- Bongu
- Soq (Male)
- Sam (Songum)
