= Mindjim River =

River in Papua New Guinea

Mindjim River Minchim River, Mindiim River
- Location within Papua New Guinea

Location
- Country: Papua New Guinea

Physical characteristics
- Source
  - location: Papua New Guinea
- Mouth
  - coordinates: 5°27′44″S 145°45′10″E

The Mindjim River is a river in northern Papua New Guinea.

== See also ==
- List of rivers of Papua New Guinea
- Mindjim River languages
