= Daga language =

Trans–New Guinea language spoken in Papua New Guinea

Daga
- Native to: Papua New Guinea
- Region: Milne Bay Province
- Native speakers: 9,000 (2007)
- Language family: Trans–New Guinea: Dagan; Daga–Mapena?; Daga

Language codes
- ISO 639-3: dgz
- Glottolog: daga1275

Daga (Dimuga, Nawp) is a non-Austronesian language of Papua New Guinea. Daga is spoken by about 9,000 people as of 2007. The peoples that speak Daga are located in the Rabaraba subdistrict of Milne Bay district, and in the Abau subdistrict of the Central district of Papua New Guinea.

== Speakers ==
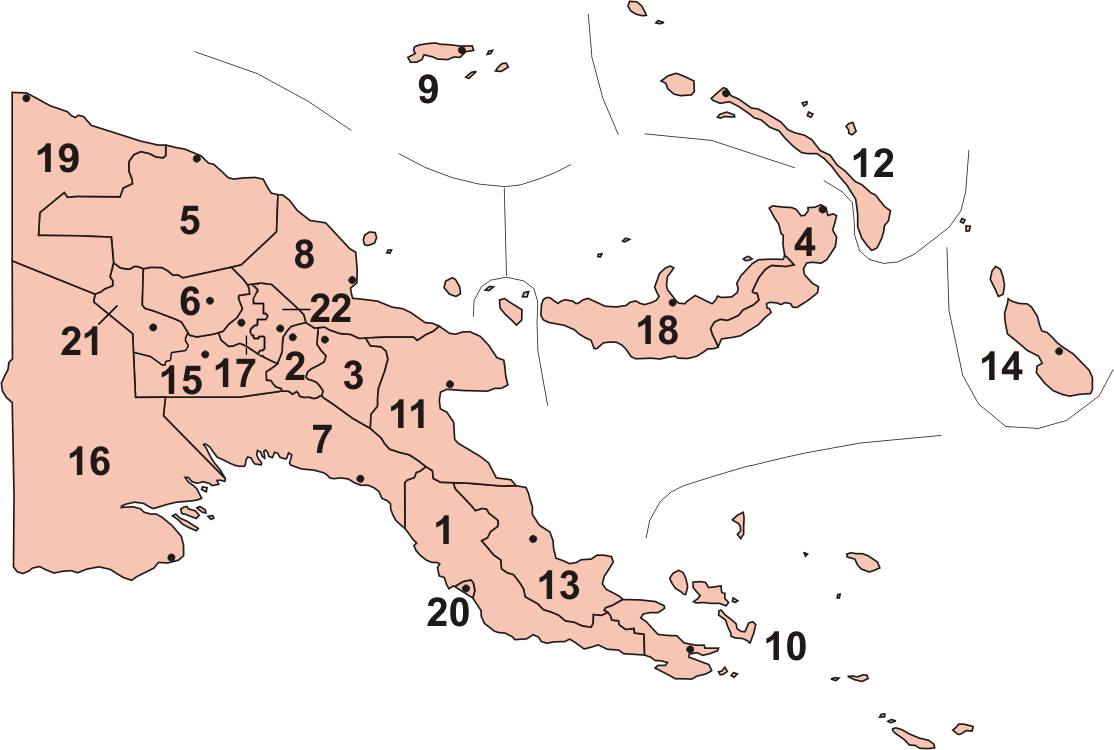
The Milne Bay Province is illustrated in section 10.

The people who speak Daga live in the Rabaraba subdistrict of the Milne Bay Province on Papua New Guinea. This province is about 5,405.4 sq mi (14,000 km^{2}) with a population of 209,054 people. The economy of the province is supported by tourism, palm oil, and gold mining on Misima Island.

During World War II, the Battle of Milne Bay took place in the province giving it some other significance.

The Massim, the people of Milne Bay, have exchanged culture with nearby islands and gained many rituals from nearby including the Kula ring. The people of the Massim are characterized by matrilineal descent.

The people of Milne Bay while distinct from, are still in culture sync with Papua New Guinea.

== Phonology ==
Daga has thirteen consonants and five vowels.

Vowel Phonemes
	Front	Back
Close	i	u
Mid	e	o
Open	ɑ	

Consonant Phonemes
	Labial	Alveolar	Palatal	Velar
Nasal	m	n		
Plosive	p b	t d		k g
Fricative	v	s		
Tap/flap		ɾ		
Approximant	w	(l)	j	

Sounds /ɾ, v/ may also range to a lateral [l, β].

== Grammar ==
=== Morphemes ===
In Daga, there are some rules for how to make morphemes. some include, the ending of stems other than G, R, S, and W add /a/ if the next suffix is a consonant-initial suffix. If the final consonant of a prefix is before a consonant-initial stem, the manner of articulation of the final consonant of the prefix is changed to match the manner of articulation of the initial consonant of the stem. When the morpheme has initial phoneme /w/ is comes before the vowel /o/ or /u/, the /w/ is lost in the final word. When the final phoneme of a preceding morpheme and the initial phoneme of a following morpheme are both vowels, the initial-vowel of the following morpheme is lost unless that phoneme is /i/, in which case it is left as is. For all nouns, the final vowel is -e.

=== Morphophonology ===
When the consonants G, R, S, and W end a stem or suffix they have a phoneme change based on the following phoneme.

Morpheme	Followed by /i/ or /e/	Followed by /a/, /o/, or /u/	Followed by Consonant	Word Final
g	g	g	---	k
r	r	r	ra	t
s	s	t	---	t
w	v	w	wa	o

This rule has exceptions for these three words:

unuG	-nege	-en	ununegen
yagiR	-nege	-iwan	yaginegiwan
ewaS	-nege	-en	ewanegen

=== Stems ===
In Daga, word stems are the part of the word that gives the word meaning. Compound word stems are often a verb stem followed by a combination of the verb yaw ("see") .

wa ('say') + yaw ('see') = wayaw ('ask')

This works with all verb stems and completely changes the meaning of the verb stem. Prefix-derived verb stems are verb stems that follow one of four prefixes, wa-, to-, en-, and a-. These prefixes are used to classify the verb stem to identify a certain thing or group of thing. The prefix wa- on a verb stem makes the verb stem only apply to one subject. The prefix to- means that the verb will be changed to involve hitting a singular subject. The prefix en- means the action depicted by the verb is changed to match an action that involves sticking into an object. The prefix a- also adjusts the verb stem to involve biting. Adjective-derived verb stems are verbs that are created by using an adjective stem and verbalization to create a verb out of an adjective. For example, the word tama ('straight') followed by the verbalization -am creates an outcome of the word tamanam ('correct'). There are also noun-derived verb stems which like adjective-derived verb stems use a verbalization and a noun stem to create a verb from a noun. An example of this is when the word ago ('servant') with the verbalization -at becomes agat ('help'). This concept of deriving words from other stems of other classifications also carries across to nouns and adjectives, where Daga has verb-derived noun stems which is when a verb can be nominalized by the suffix -at and becomes a noun. Although the stems give meaning to the word, the word isn't complete without a suffix.

=== Words ===
In Daga, like many other languages has many different classifications of words. Clitics in Daga is a classification of word which can then be classified again down into 3 more classes, location clitics which describe are used to illustrate location of a noun, substantive clitics which are the last word in a substantive clause or a nominalized clause, and included-clause clitics are used to complete clauses using homophuous medical suffixes. Postpositions are a classification of words that are similar in their manner of usage as that of a clitic in which it is used to mark location, accompaniment, comparison, and temporal construction. Positionals can also be used with personal markers to give location or demonstrate accompaniment alongside a person.

Person Markers
	Singular	Plural
1	-ma	-nu
2	-ga	-ya
3	#	-mu

=== Phrases ===
Long phrases are extremely uncommon in Daga.

In Daga, there are two intensifiers, di which is used with any phrase to add emphasis, and iren is used after a noun, adjective, and positional to add specificity. Conjunctions are used to join phrases, clauses, and sentences. The conjunctions that do these things can be considered different classifications.

Conjunctions
Phrase	Clause	Temporal	English
ge	e/si/di		and
go/o	go/o		or
	menan/gapan/anega		therefore
	iwa		because
	go/ae		but
	mini/umap		like
	anega		likewise
		boge	immediately
		gatawan	later
		amba	then
		evi	later

=== Interrogatives ===
Daga uses ya as a prefix to illustrate negative tagmeme of the normal verb phrases, and uon to illustrate negative tagmeme of a summary, sentence, conversational, response, or interrogative. Interrogatives in Daga are illustrated by the elongation of the final syllable along with an initial word to start the clause:

Interrogatives
dime	why
dim	what
ansena	which
anena	how
andi	when
amba	where
animpo	how many
da	who

=== Numbers ===
Numeral roots in Daga are created using an odd system. Daga only has the numbers 1, 2, 3, 4, and 10 and use the convention of using body-parts to represent numbers. For example, the word nani ('hand') means five and the word apen ('man') means 20 counting all the fingers and toes attached to that entity. These words along with the word yamu ('other') creates the phrases that illustrate numbers.

Numbers and Numerical phrases
Number	Daga	English
1	da	one
2	de	two
3	yampo	three
4	degede	four
10	aonugaet	ten
	iravi	all
	aruga	many
	da de	few (one or two)
