= Baropasi language =

East Geelvink Bay language of Indonesia

Baropasi
- Region: Upper Waropen District, Mamberamo Raya Regency, Papua, Indonesia
- Native speakers: (2,500 cited 1995)
- Language family: East Geelvink Bay: Baropasi

Language codes
- ISO 639-3: brp
- Glottolog: bara1375

The Baropasi or Barapasi language is a member of the East Geelvink Bay languages. It is spoken in Upper Waropen District, Mamberamo Raya Regency, Papua, Indonesia. It has about 1,000 speakers.

== Phonology ==
Consonants
		Labial	Alveolar	Velar	Glottal
Plosive	voiceless	p	t	k	ʔ
Plosive	voiced	b	d	ɡ	
Affricate			d͡z		
Fricative		v	s		h
Nasal		m	n		
Lateral			l		

Vowels
	Front	Central	Back
High	i		u
Mid	e		o
Low		a	

Barapasi is tonal, with a high tone and low tone.

== Sources ==
- Moseley, Christopher and R. E. Asher, ed. Atlas of the World's Languages (New York: Routelage, 1994) p. 111
