= Baramu language =

Papuan language of Western Province, Papua New Guinea

Baramu
- Native to: Papua New Guinea
- Native speakers: (850 cited 2000 census)
- Language family: Trans–New Guinea: Fly River (Anim); Tirio; Baramu

Language codes
- ISO 639-3: bmz
- Glottolog: bara1378

Baramu is a Papuan language of Western Province, Papua New Guinea.

Baramu is spoken in Baramura (8.447322°S 142.979563°E), Tapila (8.425835°S 142.934712°E), Tirio, and Tirio 2 villages of Gogodala Rural LLG.
