= Waruna language =

Papuan language of Gogodala-Suki family

Waruna
- Native to: Papua New Guinea
- Region: north bank, Fly River
- Native speakers: (600 cited 1991)
- Language family: Papuan Gulf ?: Gogodala–Suki; Gogodala; Waruna

Language codes
- ISO 639-3: wrv
- Glottolog: waru1267

The Waruna language is a Papuan language of the New Guinea, spoken in a bend of the Fly River. It has 50% lexical similarity with Ari, its closest relative. It is spoken in the single village of Waruna in Gogodala Rural LLG.

== Bibliography ==
Word lists

- Ray, Sidney H. 1923. The languages of the Western Division of Papua. Journal of the Royal Anthropological Institute of Great Britain and Ireland 53: 332–360.
- Riley, E. Baxter and Sidney H. Ray. 1930–1931. Sixteen vocabularies from the Fly River, Papua. Anthropos 25: 173–193, 831–850, 26: 171–192.
