= Kofei language =

Papuan language of Indonesia

Kofei
- Region: Indonesian Papua
- Native speakers: (100 cited 2000)
- Language family: East Geelvink Bay?: (disputed); Kofei–Sauri; Kofei

Language codes
- ISO 639-3: kpi
- Glottolog: kofe1239
- ELP: Kofei
- Kofei is classified as Severely Endangered by the UNESCO Atlas of the World's Languages in Danger.

Kofei is a Papuan language of the Indonesian province of Papua, on the eastern shore of Cenderawasih Bay.

Kofei is lexically similar to the East Geelvink Bay languages and presumably belongs in that family, but is too poorly attested to be sure.
