= Kerema Bay =

Bay in Papua New Guinea

- Interactive map of Kerema Bay
- Location: Gulf Province, Papua New Guinea
- Coordinates: 7°56′53″S 145°46′18″E
- Surface elevation: 1 m (3 ft 3 in)
- Settlements: Kerema

Kerema Bay is a bay in Papua New Guinea. It is located in the Gulf Province next to the capital city Kerema, 230 km northwest of Port Moresby. The climate in the region is tropical.

Location of Kerema Bay within Papua New Guinea
