= Bauwaki language =

Trans–New Guinea language spoken in Papua New Guinea

Bauwaki
- Region: Papua New Guinea
- Native speakers: (520 cited 2000 census)
- Language family: Trans–New Guinea: Papuan Peninsula; Owen Stanley Range; Mailu–Yareban; Bauwaki
- Dialects: Bauwaki; O'oku

Language codes
- ISO 639-3: bwk
- Glottolog: bauw1241

Bauwaki (Bawaki) is a Papuan language of New Guinea, sometimes classified as a member of the Mailuan family. It is 70% lexically similar to Abia of the Yareban family. Dutton (1971) proposed it to be a 'bridge' between the Mailuan and Yareban language families. O'oku, either a dialect or a closely related language, is similarly lexically 60% Yareban.
