= Astrolabe Bay Rural LLG =

Local-level government in Papua New Guinea

- Location within Papua New Guinea
- Coordinates: 5.493599°S 145.799783°E
- Country: Papua New Guinea
- Province: Madang Province
- District: Rai Coast District

Area
  - Total: 1,690 km^{2} (650 sq mi)

Population (2021 Estimate)
  - Total: 39,226
  - Density: 23.2/km^{2} (60.1/sq mi)
- Time zone: UTC+10 (AEST)

Astrolabe Bay Rural LLG is a local-level government (LLG) of Madang Province, Papua New Guinea.

== Wards ==
- 01. Kul (Siroi language speakers)
- 02. Bangri
- 03. Bang (Sam language speakers)
- 04. Bongu
- 05. Boram
- 06. Male
- 07. Lalok
- 08. Kulel
- 09. Saipa
- 10. Bom
- 11. Jamjam
- 12. Kwato
- 13. Erima
- 14. Ato
- 15. Ileg
