= Sauri language =

Papuan language of Indonesia

Sauri
- Native to: Indonesia
- Region: Sauri-Sirami village, Masirei District, Waropen Regency, Papua
- Native speakers: (100 cited 1987)
- Language family: East Geelvink Bay?: (disputed); Kofei–Sauri; Sauri

Language codes
- ISO 639-3: srt
- Glottolog: saur1251
- ELP: Sauri

Sauri is a Papuan language of the Indonesian province of Papua, on the eastern shore of Cenderawasih Bay. It is spoken in Sauri-Sirami village, Masirei District, Waropen Regency.

Sauri is lexically similar to the East Geelvink Bay languages and presumably belongs in that family, but is too poorly attested to be sure.
