= Mapena language =

Dagan language spoken in Papua New Guinea

Mapena
- Native to: Papua New Guinea
- Region: Milne Bay Province
- Native speakers: (270 cited 1973)
- Language family: Trans–New Guinea: Dagan; Daga–Mapena?; Mapena

Language codes
- ISO 639-3: mnm
- Glottolog: mape1250

Mapena is a language of Papua New Guinea.
