= Suki language =

Gogodala-Suki language of Papua New Guinea

Suki
- Native to: Papua New Guinea
- Region: Western Province
- Native speakers: 7,500 (2022)
- Language family: Papuan Gulf ?: Gogodala–Suki; Suki

Language codes
- ISO 639-3: sui
- Glottolog: suki1245

Suki is a Gogodala-Suki language spoken by about 7,500 people several miles inland along the Fly River in southwestern Papua New Guinea.

== Overview ==
Suki is primarily spoken in six villages of the Western Province: Gwaku (8.046723°S 141.525347°E), Iwewi, Ewe, Gwibaku (8.048408°S 141.733935°E), Duru (8.086882°S 141.776141°E), and Isala.

Suki is genetically related to the three other languages of the Gogodala–Suki stock, Gogodala, Ali, and Walua, but is considered a family-level isolate within this group.

As with many Papuan languages, there are very few published materials on Suki. The literacy rate in Suki is 5-15%, English is the language of instruction in schools and Hiri Motu is also spoken.

== Alternate names ==
Suki is also known as Wiram and was earlier known as Nausaku, after one of the villages where Suki was spoken. The village no longer exists, but was located near present-day Isala.

== Phonology ==
The phonology of Suki is relatively simple. It has a five-vowel system, much like many of the non-Austronesian languages of Papua New Guinea. The consonant system is also fairly simple, containing 13 phonemes. The tables below list the phonemes and their allophones; allophones are given in parentheses.

=== Consonants ===
	Labial	Alveolar	Palatal	Velar
Stops	p b (β)	t (tʰ) d		k (kʰ) ɡ (ɣ)
Fricatives		s z		
Nasals	m	n		
Approximants	w	ɾ (l)	j	

=== Vowels ===
i (ɪ) (e)		u (ʊ)
ɛ (æ)		o (ɔ)
	a (ɑ)	

=== Orthography ===
Suki is written using the Latin script without diacritics. It follows English conventions of capitalizing proper names and the first words of sentences. Punctuation is mostly as in English, though question marks and exclamation points are not used. The following letters are used to write Suki: a b d e g i k m n o p r s t u w y z. The letters w and y are used both as consonants and vowels.

== Morphology ==
Suki is an agglutinating language primarily via suffixing, though a small number of prefixes have been attested. Both nouns and verbs can take a large number of suffixes. The verbal structure is as follows, where items in parentheses are optional: verb root + (causative suffix) + (person-object suffix) + (transitive suffix) + tense suffix + person-number suffix. The person suffixes are as follows:

	Person-Object	Person-Number
1st singular	-ne	-aru
2nd/3rd singular	-ø	-eru
1st plural	-iye	-erimu
2nd/3rd plural	-de	-eru

=== Pronouns ===
The pronoun system of Suki is somewhat unusual in the world, though quite typical for a language of New Guinea, in that the pronouns for 2nd singular and 1st plural are homophonous. Just like the nouns, the pronouns can also take most case affixes.

	Singular	Plural
1st person	ne	e
2nd person	e	de
3rd person	u	i

=== Numerals ===
There are four numerals native to Suki, though only two morphemes to express these and perhaps only one of them is original to the language. Voorhoeve states that Suki seems to have borrowed menes (two) from the neighboring Zimakani people. Numerals can also take a limited number of case affixes.

1	nimap
2	menes
3	menes nimap
4	menes menes

In writing, numerals one through four are spelled out, while numerals above four are written with Arabic numerals.

== Syntax ==
Suki is a subject–object–verb (SOV) language.

== Bibliography ==
- Capell, A. A Survey of New Guinea Languages. Sydney: Sydney University Press, 1969, SBN 424054205
- Capell, Arthur. A Linguistic Survey of the South-Western Pacific. South Pacific Commission. Technical Paper No. 136. Nouméa: South Pacific Commission, 1962.
- McElhanon, K.A., and C.L. Voorhoeve, eds. The Trans–New Guinea Phylum: Explorations in Deep-Level Genetic Relationships. Vol. B #16. Sydney: The Australian National University, 1970.
- Ross, Malcolm (2005). "Pronouns as a preliminary diagnostic for grouping Papuan languages". in Andrew Pawley, Robert Attenborough, Robin Hide, Jack Golson, eds.. Papuan pasts: cultural, linguistic and biological histories of Papuan-speaking peoples. Canberra: Pacific Linguistics. pp. 15–66. ISBN 0-85883-562-2. OCLC 67292782
- The New Testament in Suki / Godte Gi Amkari Titrum Ine. Port Moresby: The Bible Society of Papua New Guinea 1981, ISBN 0-647-04755-1
- Voorhoeve, C.L., “Some Notes on the Suki-Gogodala Subgroup of the Central and South New Guinea Phylum.” in Wurm, S.A., and D.C. Laycock, eds. Pacific Linguistic Studies in Honour of Arthur Capell. Vol. Series C #13: The Australian National University, 1970, ISBN 0-85883-005-1
- Wurm, S.A., ed. New Guinea Area Languages and Language Study. Vol. 1. Canberra: Australian National University, 1977, ISBN 0-85883-132-5
