= Ginuman language =

Papuan language of Papua New Guinea

Ginuman
- Native to: Papua New Guinea
- Region: Milne Bay Province
- Native speakers: (1,400 cited 2000)
- Language family: Trans–New Guinea: Dagan; Kanasi–Ginuman?; Ginuman

Language codes
- ISO 639-3: gnm
- Glottolog: ginu1240

Ginuman is a Papuan language of New Guinea.
