= Turaka language =

Papuan language of New Guinea

Turaka
- Native to: Papua New Guinea
- Region: Milne Bay Province
- Native speakers: (25 cited 2000)
- Language family: Trans–New Guinea: Dagan; Turaka

Language codes
- ISO 639-3: trh
- Glottolog: tura1265
- ELP: Turaka
- Turaka is classified as Critically Endangered by the UNESCO Atlas of the World's Languages in Danger.

Turaka is a possibly extinct Papuan language of New Guinea.
