= Burate language =

Papuan language spoken in Indonesia

Burate
- Region: Indonesian Papua
- Native speakers: (100 cited 2000)
- Language family: East Geelvink Bay: Burate

Language codes
- ISO 639-3: bti
- Glottolog: bura1276
- ELP: Burate
- Burate is classified as Severely Endangered by the UNESCO Atlas of the World's Languages in Danger.

Burate is a Papuan language of the Indonesian province of Papua, on the eastern shore of Cenderawasih Bay. The specific areas that the Burate language is spoken in include the Papua Provence, the Wapoga river mouth, one village of the Waropen Bawah subdistrict, and the Yapen Waropen regency.

Burate is lexically similar to the East Geelvink Bay languages and presumably belongs in that family, but is too poorly attested to be sure.
