= Aga Bereho language =

Papuan language

Aga Bereho
- Bariji
- Native to: Papua New Guinea
- Region: Oro Province
- Native speakers: (460 cited 2000)
- Language family: Trans–New Guinea: Yareban; Aga Bereho

Language codes
- ISO 639-3: bjc
- Glottolog: bari1290

Aga Bereho, or ambiguously Bareji (Bariji), is a Papuan language spoken in Oro Province, in the "tail" of Papua New Guinea.
