= Doromu language =

Manubaran language of Papua New Guinea

Doromu
- Doromu-Koki
- Native to: Papua New Guinea
- Region: Central Province
- Native speakers: 2000 (2018)
- Language family: Trans–New Guinea: Manubaran; Doromu
- Dialects: Doromu; Koki

Language codes
- ISO 639-3: kqc
- Glottolog: doro1266

Doromu, or Doromu-Koki, is a Manubaran language spoken in the Papuan Peninsula in Papua New Guinea. Doromu has about 1,500 native speakers with half of them living in the capital, Port Moresby. It has three varieties: Koki, Kokila and Koriko.

== Phonology ==
Doromu has 17 phonemes: 12 are consonants and 5 are vowels.

=== Consonants ===
Below is a chart of Doromu consonants.

	Labial	Coronal	Velar
Stop	b	tʰ d	kʰ q g
Nasal	m	n	
Fricative	f β	s	
Tap		ɾ	
Approximant		j	

=== Vowels ===
Below is a chart of Doromu vowels.

	Front	Back
High	i	u
Mid	ɛ [ɛ] [e]	o
Low		a

== Orthography ==
From March 18 to March 25 of 2002 in Kasonomu village the current orthography was developed during the Doromu Alphabet Design Workshop. The orthography developed from this workshop were discussed with various areas in the language group and were agreed upon. One problem was how borrowed words with letters not contained in the Doromu orthography would be dealt with. The proposed solution from the native speakers was to spell the loan words as they are spelled in their original language.

Uppercase letters	A	B	D	E	F	G	I	K	M	N	O	R	S	T	U	V	Y
Lowercase letters	a	b	d	e	f	g	i	k	m	n	o	r	s	t	u	v	y
IPA	/a/	/b/	/d/	/ɛ/	/f/	/ɡ/	/i/	/k/	/m/	/n/	/o/	/ɾ/	/s/	/t/	/u/	/ʋ/	/j/

== Verbs ==
In Doromu verbs may have suffixes, which affect tense, aspect, mood, or switch reference.

=== Tense affixes ===
Past tense

- First person singular is indicated by -(y)aka
- Second and Third person singular are indicated by -(y)o
- First person plural is indicated by -(y)afa
- Second and Third person plural are indicated by -(y)adi

Present tense

- First person singular is indicated by -da
- Second person singular is indicated by -sa
- Third person singular is indicated by -do
- First person plural is indicated by -sifa
- Second and Third person plural are indicated by -dedi

Past tense

- First person singular is indicated by -gida
- Second person singular is indicated by -giya
- Third person singular is indicated by -go
- First person plural is indicated by -gifa
- Second and Third person plural are indicated by -gedi

== Colors ==
Below is a table of the names of different colors in Doromu.

Doromu	English
blu	blue
bora	yellow, orange
braun	brown
feo	white
gabu	black, blue, brown
kaka	red, purple
vegu	green

The words 'blu' and 'braun' are borrowed from another language. The word 'kaka' can also mean ripe. While 'vegu' is also a noun which means 'life'. 'Kamaidaforo' is the word meaning 'colorful, attractive, glittery, sparkling'.

== Numbers ==
English	Doromu	Literal Meaning
one	yokoi	
two	remanu	
three	regode	
four	vana raro	hand line
five	vana berou autu	hand side empty
six	vana berou autu yokoi maka	hand side empty one only
seven	vana berou autu remanu	hand side empty two
eight	vana berou autu regode	hand side empty three
nine	vana berou autu vana raro	hand side empty hand line
ten	vana ufo	hand clap (two hands together)
