= Soq language =

Madang language spoken in Papua New Guinea

Soq
- Male
- Native to: Papua New Guinea
- Region: Madang Province
- Native speakers: (970 cited 2000 census)
- Language family: Trans–New Guinea?: Madang; Mindjim; Soq

Language codes
- ISO 639-3: mdc
- Glottolog: male1291

Soq or Male is a Madang language spoken in Madang Province, Papua New Guinea by approximately 970 native speakers, according to the 2000 census.
