= Maiwa language (Papuan) =

Papuan language of New Guinea

Maiwa
- Native to: Papua New Guinea
- Region: Milne Bay Province
- Native speakers: (1,500 cited 2001)
- Language family: Trans–New Guinea: Dagan; Maiwa

Language codes
- ISO 639-3: mti
- Glottolog: maiw1251

Maiwa is a Papuan language of New Guinea.
