= Manubaran languages =

Language Family

Manubaran
- Mount Brown
- Geographic distribution: Mount Brown, southeastern peninsula of Papua New Guinea: Central Province
- Linguistic classification: Trans–New Guinea: Papuan Peninsula; Owen Stanley Range; Manubaran

Language codes
- Glottolog: manu1261

The Manubaran languages are a small family of Trans–New Guinea languages spoken around Mount Brown in the "Bird's Tail" (southeastern peninsula) of New Guinea. They are classified within the Southeast Papuan branch of Trans–New Guinea.

== Languages ==
The languages are Doromu and Maria, and are 63% lexically similar.

== Proto-language ==
=== Phonemes ===
Usher (2020) reconstructs the consonant inventory as follows:

*m	*n			
*p	*t		*k	*ʔ
*b	*d		*g	
	*s			[*h]
*w	*ɾ	*j		

Vowels are *a *e *i *o *u.

=== Pronouns ===
Usher (2020) reconstructs the pronouns as:

	sg	pl
1	*na	*[o/u]na
2	*ja	
3	*ina	

=== Basic vocabulary ===
==== Usher (2020) ====
Some lexical reconstructions of Proto-Mount Brown and Proto-Doromu-Koki, as well as Proto-Gebi and Proto-Maria, by Usher (2020) are:

gloss	Proto-Mount Brown	Proto-Doromu-Koki	Proto-Gebi	Proto-Maria
head	*ada	*ada	ada	*ada
hair/feather(s)	*u[w]e[t/k]a	*u[w]eta	uweta	*u[w]eʔa
ear	*anema	*anema	anema	*anema
eye	*ne	*ne	ne-una	ne[ʔ]una
nose	*uɾuma	*uɾuma	uruma	*uɾuma
tooth	*gade	*gade	gadi	*gade
tongue	*api[j]e	*aɸi[j]e	api	*aɸi[j]e
blood	*daweʔa	*dawaʔa	dawa	*daweʔa
bone	*nena	*nena	nena	*nena
skin/bark	*ɾoʔo	*ɾoʔo	lo-o	*ɾoʔo
breast	*sisu	*sisu	sisu	*hihu
louse	*gu[w]e	*gu[w]e	gu-e	*gu[w]e
dog	*auna	*auna	auna	*auna
pig	*dona	*dona	dona	*dona
bird	*eɾena	*eɾena	eerma	*eɾena
egg	*unema	*unema	unema	*unema
tree	*jabo	*jabo	iabo	*jabo
man/husband	*ami[j]e	*ami[j]e	amie	*ami[j]e
woman/wife	*ɾema	*ɾema	lema	
sun	*me[i]daʔa	*me[i]daʔa	meda	*me[i]daʔa
moon	*ejoʔa	*ejoʔo	e-io	*ejoʔa
water/river	*koɾu	*koɾu	oru ≈ koro-	*ʔoɾu
fire	*ita	*ita	ita	*iha
stone	*waʔiga		waiga	*waʔiga
path	*ida	*ida	ida	
name	*ɾoka	*ɾoka		*ɾoʔa
eat/drink	*iɾi-	*iɾi-		*iɾi-
one	*jokohi	*jokoi	jokio	*joʔohi
two	*[ɾ/j]ema	*[ɾ]ema	lema	*jema

==== Ross (2014) ====
The following basic vocabulary words of Proto-Manubaran and lower-level reconstructions by Malcolm Ross (2014) are from the Trans-New Guinea database:

gloss	Proto-Manubaran	Proto-Doromu	Proto-Maria
head	*ada	*ada	*ada
hair	*weʔia	*ue-ta	*ueʔa
ear	*ane-ma	*ane-ma	*ane-ma
eye	*ne(u)	*ne(-)	*ne-
nose	*uru-ma	*uru-ma	*uru-ma
tooth	*gade	*gade	*gade
tongue	*afie	*afie	*ahie
leg	*[n,y]u-ka	*yu-ka	*nu-ʔa; *one-ʔa
louse	*gue	*gue	*gue
dog	*auna	*auna	*auna
pig	*Dona	*dona	*tona
bird	*erena	*erena	*erena
egg	*une-ma	*une-ma	*une-ma
blood		*tava	*tae(k,ʔ)a
bone	*nena	*nena	*nena
skin	*roʔ(o,a)	*ro(a)	*roʔ(o,a)
tree	*yabo	*yabo	*yabo
man	*amie	*amie	*amie
woman		*rema	*oue
sky	*gure	*gure	*gure
sun	*maida(ka)	*meida(ka)	*maidaʔa
moon	*e(y)oʔa; *mohe- (?)		*eoʔa
water	*koru	*koru	*ʔoru
fire	*ita	*ita	*ita
stone		*fore	*vaʔiga
name	*roka	*roka	*roʔa-ba
eat	*iri-	*iri	*iri-
one	*yokohi	*yokoima	*yoʔohi
two	*(ye)(ka)ma[nu]	*re-manu	*ye-ma

== Evolution ==
Maria reflexes of proto-Trans-New Guinea (pTNG) etyma are:

- ama ‘mother’ < *am(a,i)
- baba(e) ‘father’ < *mbapa
- kuyau ‘cassowary’ < *ku(y)a
- ita(isa) ‘tree’ < *inda
