= Demisa language =

Papuan language of Indonesia

Demisa
- Region: Indonesian Papua
- Native speakers: (400 cited 2000)
- Language family: East Geelvink Bay: Bauzi–Demisa; Demisa

Language codes
- ISO 639-3: dei
- Glottolog: demi1242
- ELP: Demisa

Demisa is a Papuan language of the Indonesian province of Papua, on the eastern shore of Cenderawasih Bay. It is spoken in Botawa, Desawa, and Muyere villages.
