= Anjam language =

Madang language spoken in Papua New Guinea

Anjam
- Bom
- Native to: Papua New Guinea
- Region: Madang Province
- Native speakers: 2,000 (2003)
- Language family: Trans–New Guinea?: Madang; Mindjim; Anjam

Language codes
- ISO 639-3: boj
- Glottolog: anja1238

Anjam or Bom is a Madang language spoken in Madang Province, Papua New Guinea.

Other names include Bogadjim, Bogajim, Bogati, and Lalok. It is spoken in villages such as Bogadjim (5.456579°S 145.736607°E).

== Orthography ==
Anjam is written in the Latin script. The alphabet has 22 letters.

Letters (uppercase)	A	B	D	E	G	I	J	K	L	M	N	Ñ	Ŋ	O	P	Q	R	S	T	U	W	Y
Letters (lowercase)	a	b	d	e	g	i	j	k	l	m	n	ñ	ŋ	o	p	q	r	s	t	u	w	y
IPA	/ɑ/	/b/	/d/	/e/	/g/	/i/	/dʑ/	/k/	/l/	/m/	/n/	/ɲ/	/ŋ/	/o/	/p/	/q/	/r/	/s/	/t/	/u/	/w/	/j/
