= Wildlands Restoration Volunteers =

U.S. non-profit organization

- Abbreviation: WRV
- Formation: March 20, 1999; 27 years ago
- Founder: Ed Self
- Type: Nonprofit
- Tax ID no.: 46-0505155
- Legal status: 501(c)(3)
- Headquarters: Longmont, Colorado
- Region served: Colorado
- Board Chair: Ashley Vander Meeden
- Executive Director: Dave Elmore
- Website: https://www.wrv.org/

Wildlands Restoration Volunteers (WRV) is a non-profit volunteer-centered organization, established in 1999, that organizes high-quality ecological restoration projects on public lands in the United States. The WRV mission is to foster a community spirit of shared responsibility for the stewardship and restoration of public and protected lands. WRV organizes more than 200 volunteer projects per year, completing a wide variety of important habitat restoration and conservation work. Some projects are completed in a single day, while others may last a weekend or longer. Projects lasting more than one day allow for camping opportunities in mountain settings. Attendance ranges from 10 to over 100, depending on the project type. During overnight projects, the group provides meals to its volunteers.

WRV has offices in Longmont and Fort Collins and works primarily across Colorado and southern Wyoming.
