= Ihu Rural LLG =

Local-level government in Papua New Guinea

- Location within Papua New Guinea
- Coordinates: 7.904516°S 145.400674°E
- Country: Papua New Guinea
- Province: Gulf Province
- Time zone: UTC+10 (AEST)

Ihu Rural LLG is a local-level government (LLG) of Gulf Province, Papua New Guinea.

== Wards ==
- 01. Avavu
- 02. Harevavo
- 03. Kaivukavu
- 04. Arehava
- 05. Kavava
- 06. Harilarewa
- 07. Lariau
- 08. Pakovavu
- 09. Haruape
- 11. Lovehoho
- 12. Ovahuhu
- 13. Vailala
- 14. Karokaro
- 15. Herehere
- 16. Koialahu
- 17. Lepokela
- 18. Akapiru
- 19. Hepa
- 20. Heawa
- 21. Maelava
- 22. Belepa
- 84. Ihu Station
