= East Geelvink Bay languages =

Papuan language family of Indonesia

East Geelvink Bay
- East Cenderawasih
- Geographic distribution: Papua Province, Indonesia
- Linguistic classification: One of the world's primary language families

Language codes
- Glottolog: geel1240
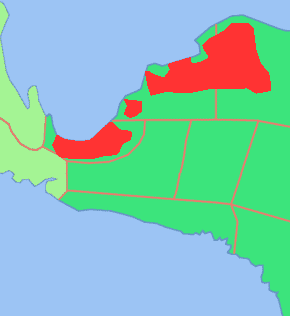

The East Geelvink Bay or East Cenderawasih languages are a language family of a dozen Papuan languages along the eastern coast of Geelvink Bay in Indonesian Papua, which is also known as Sarera Bay or Cenderawasih.

== Languages ==
- East Geelvink Bay
  - Turunggare, Burate
  - Barapasi
  - Bauzi–Demisa, Nisa-Anasi (Bapu)
  - Central
    - Sirami River: Kofei–Sauri, Tefaro
    - Woria

Of these, only Turunggare, Barapasi, and Bauzi are known well enough to demonstrate a relationship, though they are all lexically similar (> 60%). The unclassified Kehu language, spoken between Turunggare and Burate, may turn out to be East Geelvink Bay as well.

Bauzi is the best documented East Geelvink Bay language, but may or may not be representative of the Geelvink Bay family as a whole.

== Classification ==
A relationship between Yawa, spoken on Yapen Island, and the East Geelvink Bay languages was tentatively proposed by C. L. Voorhoeve in 1975 in a proposal he called Geelvink Bay. The hypothesis was taken up by Stephen Wurm, who developed it as part of an initial attempt to classify the Papuan languages; however, the relationship would be a distant one, and later linguists such as Mark Donohue considered Yawa to be a language isolate.

Clouse (1997) removed the Lakes Plain languages of the upper Mamberamo River in the interior of Papua from Trans–New Guinea, where Würm had placed them, and by comparison with Bauzi and Demisa proposes them to be a sister family of the East Geelvink Bay languages. Basic vocabulary cognates that Clouse suggests to connect the two stocks include:

meaning	Proto-Lakes Plain	Bauzi	Demisa
'eye'	*kudatiCV	(faxo)	halukwa
'muscle'	*tV	nubu	(betinukwa)
'water'	*deida	vaɔ	wɔte
'fire'	*kudaide	vua	gwa
'tree'	*kuCV	uto	
'black'	*kVCa	gihot	giho
'child'	*tau-bri	data	dataβi
'we'	*ai	i	
'go, walk'	*kidia	la	
'blow'	*pudV	fɛu	
'feces'	*pade	haɛ	
'arrow'	*poka	fɔ	
'bad'	Proto-Tariku: *ɸVra	fait	

However, in his 2005 classification based on comparative evidence from pronouns, Malcolm Ross treats all three groups as separate families, with Yawa tentatively placed in an extended West Papuan family.

== Typology ==
Verbal morphology in the East Geelvink Bay family is less complex than that of Tor-Kwerba languages, but is more complex than that of the Lakes Plain languages.

== Pronouns ==
The pronouns Ross reconstructs for Proto–East Geelvink Bay are,

I	*e	we	*i
thou	*o	you	*u
s/he	*a	they	?

== Basic vocabulary ==
Basic vocabulary of selected East Cenderawasih languages (Barapasi, Bauzi, Demisa, Tunggare) listed in Foley (2018). These are not necessarily cognate.

East Cenderawasih family basic vocabulary
gloss	Barapasi	Bauzi	Demisa	Tunggare
'bird'	de	bume	bijana	dinarate
'blood'	nosi	vasɛa	nahabi	nahavei
'bone'	para	fa	heta	ha
'eat'	ai	æ		ɣayo
'egg'	moʔa	ɔɔ	mwa	ʔoʔo
'eye'	aronua	faxo	halukwa	hanua
'fire'	awa	vua	gwa	urehe
'give'	wai	lɔ		nore
'ground'	deta	bake	bæi	baʔe
'hair'	nawa	ohuta	ohutai	ohitaʔi
'head'	osi	ohula	ohuda	ʔohaha
'I'	emi	e	emdə	ei
'leg'	naro	naɔ	naro	nal
'louse'	woa	vɔa	yo	ʔua
'man'	doro	dam	damateha	date
'name'	here	ɛ		ʔe
'one'	orari	væmtɛa	natudüe	duaʔa
'see'	ute	aa		maʔai
'stone'	aea	kɛ	ɛdu	hahia
'sun'	wapao	ala	arɔ	au
'tooth'	moru	mo	molu	mou
'tree'	auma	uto		uto-me
'two'	apimi	bɛhæsu	utahu	amaite
'water'	waro	vaɔ	wɔte	mana
'we'	i-me	i		i
'you (pl)'	u-mi	u		wi

The following basic vocabulary words are from Clouse (1997) and Voorhoeve (1975), as cited in the Trans-New Guinea database:

gloss	Bauzi	Demisa	Barapasi	Tunggare
head	dauha; ohula	ohuda	osi	ʔohaha
hair	ohuta	ohutai	nəwa	ohitaʔi
ear	dogoi	hema		
eye	fako; faxo	halukwa	aronua	hanua
nose	ɔmtɔ	omata		
tooth	mõ		moru	mou
tongue	iso	itsa		
leg	nabaː; nao	naɾo	naro	nal
louse	vɔa; vwa	yo	woa	ʔua
dog	vɛm; veme	nimi		weme
pig	doho; dɔhɔ	beiji		doho
bird	bume; bumɛ	bijana	de	dinarate
egg	ʔo; ɔɔ	mwa	moʔa	ʔoʔo
blood	vasɛa; veiso	nahabi	nosi	nahavei
bone	fa; oveha	heta	para	ha
skin	sogoba; sɔkɔba	hiɔ	terebaʔa	isaʔa
breast	ahudɛ	ubɾa		
tree	uto		auma	uto-me
man	data		doro	date
sky	asum	asunawa		
sun	ala; ala(meoho)	aɾɔ	wapao	au
moon	ala	aɾo		
water	valo; vaɔ	wɔte	waro	mana
fire	üwa; vua	gwa	awa	urehe
stone	kɛ; khe	ɛdu	aea	hahia
name	ɛ; ele		here	ʔe
eat	æ; udeʔa		aire	ghayo
one	væmtɛa; vamtia	natudüe	orari	duaʔa
two	beasu; bɛhæsu	utahu	apimi	amaite

== See also ==
- Papuan languages
- Districts of Papua for a list of districts and villages with respective languages
