= Bauzi language =

East Geelvink language of Papua, Indonesia

Bauzi
- Native to: Indonesia
- Region: Papua (Mamberamo Raya)
- Ethnicity: Bauzi
- Native speakers: (1,500 cited 1991)
- Language family: East Geelvink Bay: Bauzi–Demisa; Bauzi

Language codes
- ISO 639-3: bvz
- Glottolog: bauz1241

Bauzi (also written Baudi, Baudji, Baudzi, Bauri) is a Papuan language of the East Geelvink Bay family spoken in the Indonesian province of Papua.

Dialects are Gesda Dae, Neao, and Aumenefa. Villages are Danau Bira, Itaba, Kustera, Neao, Noiadi, Solom, and Vakiadi. It is reported to use a mode of whistled speech.

Bauzi is the best documented East Geelvink Bay language, but may or may not be representative of the Geelvink Bay family as a whole.

== Phonology ==
=== Consonants ===
Here are the consonants of Bauzi:

		Bilabial	Alveolar	Velar	Glottal
Plosive	voiceless		t	k	
Plosive	voiced	b	d	ɡ	
Affricate			ʣ		
Fricative	voiceless	f	s		h
Fricative	voiced	v			
Nasal		m	n		
Lateral			l		

=== Vowels ===
Here are the vowels of Bauzi:

	Front	Back
High	i	u
Mid	e	o
Near-low	æ	
Low	a	

== Pronouns ==
Bauzi pronoun roots are:

	sg	pl
1	e-	i-
2	o-	u-
3	a-	

== Morphology ==
The two directional suffixes are:

- -su ‘toward’
- -to ‘away’

Aspectual suffixes are:

- imperfective -da
- perfective -ho
- prospective -lo (homophonous with the verb ‘give’)
- inceptive -le (homophonous with the verb ‘come’)
- conative -so
- resultative/stative -de
- iterative -dete ~ -ia

== Verbs ==
Bauzi verbs that have number agreement for singular and plural:

- faito ‘cut down [SG.OBJ]’, fikboa ‘cut down [PL.OBJ]’
- valo ‘pull out [SG.OBJ]’, vaomoa ‘pull out [PL.OBJ]’
- esu ‘put [SG.OBJ]’, vahe ‘put [PL.OBJ]’
- ai ‘stay [SG.SBJ], esi ‘stay [PL.SBJ]’
- ita ‘flee [SG.SBJ]’, ili ‘flee [PL.OBJ]’
