= Kanasi language =

Papuan language of Papua New Guinea

Kanasi
- Sona
- Native to: Papua New Guinea
- Region: Milne Bay Province
- Native speakers: (2,500 cited 2000)
- Language family: Trans–New Guinea: Dagan; Kanasi–Ginuman?; Kanasi

Language codes
- ISO 639-3: soq
- Glottolog: kana1288

Kanasi (or Sona) is the easternmost Papuan language of New Guinea.

== Phonology ==
=== Vowels ===
	Front	Central	Back
Close	i		u
Mid	e		o
Open		ɑ <a>	

=== Consonants ===
	Bilabial	Alveolar	Velar	Glottal
Voiceless stop	p	t	k	ʔ (unwritten)
Voiced stop	b	d	g	
Nasal	m	n		
Trill		r		
Fricative		s		(h)
Approximant	w		ɰ <l>	
