= Wantoat language =

Finisterre language spoken in Papua New Guinea

Wantoat
- Taap
- Native to: Papua New Guinea
- Region: Morobe Province
- Native speakers: (8,200 cited 1978)
- Language family: Trans–New Guinea: Finisterre–Huon; Finisterre; Wantoat languages; Wantoat

Language codes
- ISO 639-3: wnc
- Glottolog: want1252
- ELP: Wantoat
- Wantoat is classified as Critically Endangered by the UNESCO Atlas of the World's Languages in Danger.

Wantoat, named after the Wantoat River, is one of the Finisterre languages of Papua New Guinea. Dialects are Wapu (Leron), Central Wantoat, Bam, Yagawak (Kandomin), continuing on to Awara, though the last is only 60–70% lexically similar to Wantoat and Wapu. Major Wantoat villages are Gwabogwat, Mamabam, Matap, Ginonga, Kupung.

== Phonology ==
Consonants
		Bilabial	Alveolar	Palatal	Velar	
		Bilabial	Alveolar	Palatal	plain	lab.
Nasal		m	n		ŋ	ŋʷ
Stop	plain	p	t		k	kʷ
Stop	pre.	ᵐb	ⁿd		ᵑɡ	ᵑɡʷ
Fricative	plain		s			
Fricative	pre.		ⁿz			
Approximant				j		w

Consonants clusters with mixed voicing occur within words:

okᵑɡa 'your uncle', kaotⁿdu 'half', ɡeᵐbikᵐbik 'lip', temⁿzin 'they will shoot it', kapⁿza 'strong'

i				u
e				o
		ə		
	æ			
			ɑ	

Vowel sequences are /ie iə iɑ iu, ee eə eɑ eu, əə, ææ æə, ɑɑ ɑo ɑu, oi oə oɑ, uu/.

Syllables are minimally V and maximally CVVC. Stress is distinctive but has a low functional load.

== Sample texts ==
Sample text in Wantoat

1. Buyambam tapa, gata kakuya na nanduyuayak kapanin. Unzingge nata sanga tapatue dapnanga dua.
2. Ita na tasiwan zongazonga kaya noman komune pekgat. Siwan ita na yangga mateknga kuma zipmakaingune nanitakuwan nata tangoke yuwa takanggak.
3. Sike ita nae kekeknga kayuk namunggak. Namuke ita na kepi noman tapaapane nanitake kunggak. Unzing ita tupa tasinangge yakut taknga tawake tasinggak.
4. Anutu, nata damene zikaa dakaatang kuke ngana gata gatangami akumnanga akngae nata dua gwaumbit. Dasingge? Ga naat gatake yuamak. Nata ga gandupa gusou sipsipde kakuya tasikaingga pakaing kapaapa apanggayak. Unzing kake natane musipma kwikwikngata yuwit. Nata wai sinanga dua.
5. Gata natane nanama take siknga keu aanggaman komune pandaknganggayak. Siwan natane iwanata moo nanduke sanga takngatu tasinanga dua. Ge, gata naat nasimde apbakngake naninggayak. Gata nanamu nae kwaapzang siknga pewi dopan namunggayak.
6. Gata nae banip gwaang natake sanga take akngakan tasingamunggayakge tapduk bamu nata kayuk yuwawa gata nae musip kwikwiu asinggan natangamuya. Unzingge nata yotdane asinggan asinggan yuwit.

Translation

1. The LORD is my shepherd, I lack nothing.
2. He makes me lie down in green pastures, he leads me beside quiet waters,
3. He refreshes my soul. He guides me along the right paths for his name’s sake.
4. Even though I walk through the darkest valley, I will fear no evil, for you are with me; your rod and your staff, comfort me.
5. You prepare a table before me in the presence of my enemies. You anoint my head with oil; my cup overflows.
6. Surely your goodness and love will follow me all the days of my life, and I will dwell in the house of the LORD forever.
