= Bauzi people =

Ethnic group in Indonesia

Baudi, Baudji, Baudzi, Bauri

Total population
- 1,500 (1991)

Regions with significant populations
- Indonesia (Papua)

Languages
- Bauzi, Indonesian

Religion
- Christianity (60%), animism (40%)

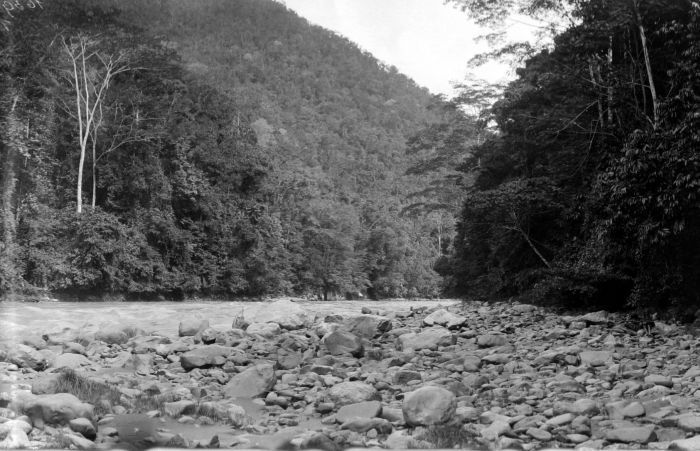
The Mamberamo River, the traditional residential area of the Bauzi people.

The Bauzi or Baudi is an ethnic group living in the north-central part of the Indonesian province of Papua (formerly Irian Jaya). The Bauzi area consists of much of the west side of lower Mamberamo River area in northern Papua. The Bauzi people lived on hunting and gathering in the jungle. While the Bauzi people were historically an animistic people group, they are now 60% Christian. In general, inter-tribal warfare is no longer a major part of Bauzi culture. In recent years, linguists have been studying their language and translating various literature, including the Bible, into the Bauzi language.

By the mission and language institute, Summer Institute of Linguistics (SIL), the Bauzi people are included in the list of 14 isolated ethnic groups in the world. However, nowadays most of them live in villages that can be accessed by boat, ship, and airplane, although they are still isolated by land access. They are known as an ethnic group of crocodile hunters. They consume crocodile and snake meat, which they consider the finest food. The meat is cooked by grilling it over a fire and eaten with sago, grilled banana, or breadfruit.

== See also ==
- Indigenous people of New Guinea
