= Moikodi language =

Papuan language of Papua New Guinea

Moikodi
- Doriri
- Native to: Papua New Guinea
- Region: Oro Province
- Native speakers: (570 cited 1981)
- Language family: Trans–New Guinea: Yareban; Moikodi–Abia; Moikodi

Language codes
- ISO 639-3: mkp
- Glottolog: moik1239

Moikodi, or Doriri, is a Papuan language spoken in Oro Province, in the "tail" of Papua New Guinea. Half of speakers are monolingual.
