= Morawa language =

Papuan language of New Guinea

Morawa
- Region: Papua New Guinea
- Native speakers: (1,100 cited 2000 census)
- Language family: Trans–New Guinea: Mailuan; Morawa

Language codes
- ISO 639-3: mze
- Glottolog: mora1273

Morawa is a Papuan language of New Guinea.
