= Thiosulfate dehydrogenase (quinone) =

thiosulfate dehydrogenase (quinone)

Identifiers
- EC no.: 1.8.5.2

Databases
- IntEnz: IntEnz view
- BRENDA: BRENDA entry
- ExPASy: NiceZyme view
- KEGG: KEGG entry
- MetaCyc: metabolic pathway
- PRIAM: profile
- PDB structures: RCSB PDB PDBe PDBsum
- Gene Ontology: AmiGO / QuickGO
Search
- PMC: articles
- PubMed: articles
- NCBI: proteins

In enzymology, a thiosulfate dehydrogenase (quinone) (EC 1.8.5.2) is an enzyme that catalyzes the chemical reaction

2 thiosulfate + 2 6-decylubiquinone $\rightleftharpoons$ tetrathionate + 2 6-decylubiquinol

Thus, the two substrates of this enzyme are thiosulfate and 6-decylubiquinone, whereas its two products are tetrathionate and 6-decylubiquinol.

This enzyme belongs to the family of oxidoreductases, specifically those acting on a sulfur group of donors with a quinone or similar compound as acceptor. The systematic name of this enzyme class is thiosulfate:6-decylubiquinone oxidoreductase. Other names in common use include thiosulfate:quinone oxidoreductase, thiosulphate:quinone oxidoreductase, thiosulfate oxidoreductase, tetrathionate-forming, and TQO.
