= Maria language (Papua New Guinea) =

Manubaran language spoken in Papua New Guinea

Maria
- Native to: Papua New Guinea
- Region: Central Province
- Native speakers: (1,400 cited 2000 census)
- Language family: Trans–New Guinea: Manubaran; Maria

Language codes
- ISO 639-3: mds
- Glottolog: mari1438

Maria is a Manubaran language spoken in the "Bird's Tail" of Papua New Guinea by approximately 1,350 people in Central Province. It is alternatively known as Gebi and Manubara.
