= Santa Cruz language =

Santa Cruz language may refer to:

- Natügu language, formerly known as Santa Cruz language, in reference to Santa Cruz island in the Solomon Islands
  - Nalögo language, formerly thought to be a dialect of the same Santa Cruz language
- Awaswas language, also known as Santa Cruz language, in reference to Santa Cruz County, in central California
- Cruzeño language, also known as Santa Cruz Costanoan language, in reference to Santa Cruz Island in southern California.

== See also ==
- Santa Cruz
