= Opao language =

Language

Opao
- Native to: Papua New Guinea
- Region: Gulf Province: Orokolo and Keuru area
- Native speakers: 2,000 (2005)
- Language family: Trans–New Guinea: Eleman; nuclear Eleman; Western; Opao

Language codes
- ISO 639-3: opo
- Glottolog: opao1240

Opao is a Trans–New Guinea language of Papua New Guinea.
