= Mala language =

Mala language may refer to:

- Mala language (Papua New Guinea)
- Mala language (Nigeria)
