= Gogodala people =

Papua New Guinean group

Gogodala is the name of an ethnic/language group from the Middle Fly District of the Western Province of Papua New Guinea. They speak the Gogodala language, which belongs to the Trans-New Guinea language family. It is one of about a thousand distinct ethnic groups in the country, each which has its own language and culture.

== Overview ==
The Gogodala are a tribe of approximately 25,000, located in 33 villages in Papua New Guinea. Their territory extends from the Aramia River to the lower Fly River, and it is the most populous Local-Level Government area in the province. Their territory is divided into West, East and Fly areas. The Gogodala occupy mostly the flat terrain and the floodplain areas. (Wilde 2004)

== Culture ==
Canoes are a very important part of the Gogodala culture. "The Gogodala use of dugout canoes for everyday activities such as fishing, collecting firewood, carrying house posts, transporting sago and garden produce, people also characterize themselves as metaphorically 'being inside', or standing inside, their clan canoe." (Wilde 2004) Canoes are an important means of transport and an aid to hunting. The tribe is located along a river in order to have access to this transportation, in addition to fishing and using the river for water. The network of rivers and water channels enable the Gogodola to have access to a wide area.

Their origin story says that the Gogodala ancestors traveled to this area in large canoes. The Gogodala trace their lineage to the original members of clans who settled in the area at the time. They also trace their lineage to the canoes which their ancestors used to travel there. (Wilde 2004)

Until the mid-twentieth century, Gogodala villages typically consisted of a single communal thatched-roof longhouse, often more than 100 m. in length. The longhouse at Isago, constructed in the 1950s, was three stories tall and 127.7 m. long. It was pulled down in 1979. The Gogodala now live in smaller one- or two-room thatched huts scattered about the village site. (Baldwin 1989)

The Gogodala have a clan-based kinship system. They trace their origins to the eight clans said to originate from Ibali, the father of the Gogodala. It is said that he gave a powerful canoe to each of his eight sons, who were the patriarchs of eight clans. "Within each of the eight clans, people are further divided into several sub-clans, or canoes, which trace their lineage back to the primary ancestor and clan canoe. The premise of this clan and canoe system is a marriage practice that continues to be organized along the lines of a prescribed clan exchange system, referred to elsewhere as 'sister-exchange'." (Wilde 2004)

For males in the Gogodala tribe, their lives are determined by their power or strength, which they call kamali. "An entity that resides in blood, kamali is the substance responsible for bodily efficacy and health." (Wilde 2004) From this notion the Gogodala derived that a person's kamali is seen through his work. Villagers are characterized by how they work in activities such as house-building, sago making, hunting and gardening.

== Economy ==
In the Gogodala tribes, work is divided along gender lines, with responsibilities based around extended families. Both men and women work and provide assistance when it is needed. Work for men ranges from paid employment in Balimo to hunting, making gardens, building houses, constructing canoes, clearing land, and cutting grass. Jobs for women include rearing children, "cooking, fishing, making sago, sago bags, grass mats and fishing baskets, collecting firewood and other bush materials for use in the house, caring for animals and maintaining the house." (Wilde 2004) Although the Gogodala "desire the benefits of money, clothes, food, houses, water tanks, electricity and store goods that town people enjoy, town people lament the loss of freedom afforded by the village lifestyle". (Wilde 2004)

The production and preparation of sago, for which women are normally responsible, is important work. Since Gogodala villages are normally near swamps and lagoons, they have access to the proper conditions for growing sago palms. The women often have to travel distances to reach their areas for cultivating the palms. "Women are primarily responsible for the production and preparation of sago, from cutting down the palm, to cooking and preparing the sago flour for eating." (Dundon 2002) According to the oral history of the people, a male ancestor brought the original sago with him and cultivated it in certain areas for others to collect. If eaten correctly, Sago gives energy. It is very important in Gogodala culture to consume sago. (Dundon 2002)

== Law and religion ==
Since the Gogodala are a part of Papua New Guinea, they are governed by a Parliament that follows English common Law. The main goal of the courts was to determine certain customs that could be established throughout the whole country but that at the same time would not infringe on the many cultures. Because of the many different cultures in Papua New Guinea, it is extremely difficult to properly enforce the law.

Since the law remains tough to enforce, cultures rely mainly on religion to establish norms and customs. While originally there was a very strong opposition to the establishment of the churches, because of missionaries and the creation of the Evangelical Church of Papua, in 2003 over 90% of the 25,000 Gogodala claimed to be Christian. Ever since its establishment, Christianity has caused immense changes on the Gogodala.

As Christianity became established, missionaries banned smoking tobacco and drinking of kava, which were grown locally. Missionaries also determined that objects and dances that were associated with male initiatory processes, mainly those associated with Aida ceremonies, were not suitable for Christianity. Thus, missionaries and Gogodala Christians traveled to neighboring villages and emphasized that these traditions and objects be banned and destroyed. (Dundon 2002)

Some Gogodala have identified as one of the Ten Lost Tribes of Israel.
