= Umanakaina language =

Papuan language of New Guinea

Umanakaina
- Gwedena
- Native to: Papua New Guinea
- Region: Milne Bay Province
- Native speakers: (2,400 cited 1987)
- Language family: Trans–New Guinea: Dagan; Umanakaina

Language codes
- ISO 639-3: gdn
- Glottolog: uman1240

Umanakaina, or Gwedena, is a Papuan language of New Guinea. It is a rather divergent member of the Dagan family.

== Bibliography ==
Word lists

- Anonymous. 1914. Vocabularies of languages spoken by the people of the Gwoiru mountains, and the Kanamara people on the main range and from Paiwa, Goodenough Bay, N. E. D. Papua Annual Report 1913–1914: 184–184.
- Ray, Sidney H. 1938. The languages of the Eastern and South-Eastern Division of Papua. Journal of the Royal Anthropological Institute of Great Britain and Ireland 68: 153–208. (Also includes word lists of Dima and other languages)
