= Keoru language =

Language

Moivo Hivi
- Lower Ahia - Kouri
- Native to: Papua New Guinea
- Region: Gulf Province
- Native speakers: (6,000 cited 2000 census)
- Language family: Trans–New Guinea: Eleman; nuclear Eleman; Western; Moivo Hivi
- Dialects: Kouri Miri; Lower Ahia

Language codes
- ISO 639-3: xeu
- Glottolog: keor1235

Keuru, or Keoru-Ahia after two of its dialects, is a Trans–New Guinea language of Papua New Guinea. Roughly 6,000 people speak Keoru.
