= Nisa-Anasi language =

Language

Anasi
- Nisa-Anasi
- Bapu
- Native to: Indonesia
- Region: Sawai District, Mamberamo Raya Regency, Papua
- Native speakers: (2,500 cited 1987–1993)
- Language family: East Geelvink Bay?: Anasi
- Dialects: Anasi; Nisa

Language codes
- ISO 639-3: Either: bpo – Anasi njs – Nisa
- Glottolog: nisa1239

Nisa (Bonefa, Kerema) and Anasi (Bapu), are dialects of a Papuan language of the Indonesian province of Papua, on the eastern shore of Cenderawasih Bay in Sawai District, Mamberamo Raya Regency. Language use is vigorous.

Nisa-Anasi is lexically similar to the East Geelvink Bay languages and presumably belongs in that family.
