= Abom language =

Nearly-extinct language spoken in Papua New Guinea

Abom
- Region: Papua New Guinea
- Native speakers: 3 (2018)
- Language family: Trans–New Guinea: Abom

Language codes
- ISO 639-3: aob
- Glottolog: abom1238
- ELP: Abom
- Map of the Abom language in relation to other Papuan languages. The Abom language (located bottom center, to the west of the gulf) Other Trans–New Guinea languages Other Papuan languages Austronesian languages Uninhabited

- Abom is classified as Critically Endangered by the UNESCO Atlas of the World's Languages in Danger

Abom is a nearly extinct language spoken in the Western Province of Papua New Guinea. According to a 2002 census, only 15 people still speak this language. All of the speakers are older adults. Middle-aged adults have some understanding of it, but no children speak or understand Abom.

Abom is spoken in the villages of Lewada (8.335225°S 142.780449°E), Mutam (8.424996°S 142.930364°E), and Tewara (8.374194°S 142.45638°E) in Gogodala Rural LLG.

== Classification ==
Abom is not close to other languages. Pawley and Hammarström (2018) classify Abom as a divergent Tirio language on the basis of morphological evidence; Abom shares the same gender ablaut pattern as other Tirio languages. Evans (2018), however, lists Abom as a separate branch of Trans-New Guinea. Suter & Usher find that it is not an Anim language (the Trans–New Guinea family that includes the Tirio languages), but does appear to be divergent Trans–New Guinea. Part of the problem lies in the fact that many recorded Abom words are loans from the Inland Gulf languages, reducing the material needed for comparison.

== Pronouns ==
Jore and Alemán (2002: 48) give pronouns for Abom as follows:

	sg.	pl.
1	nɛ:	gɛ:
2	gɛ:	
3	ete	dzi

== Bibliography ==
- "Sociolinguistic survey of the Tirio language family", Tim Jore and Laura Aleman. Unpublished Manuscript.
- "Endangered languages listing: ABOM [aob]" (PDF). Archived from the original (PDF) on 2015-07-24.
