= Domu language =

Trans–New Guinea language spoken in Papua New Guinea

Domu
- Dom
- Region: Papua New Guinea
- Native speakers: (950 cited 2000)
- Language family: Trans–New Guinea: Mailuan; Domu

Language codes
- ISO 639-3: dof
- Glottolog: domu1245

Domu (Dom) is a Papuan language of New Guinea.
