= Binahari language =

Papuan language of New Guinea

Binahari
- Region: Papua New Guinea
- Native speakers: (630 cited 2000 census)
- Language family: Trans–New Guinea: Mailuan; Binahari
- Dialects: Binahari-Neme; Binahari-Ma

Language codes
- ISO 639-3: bxz
- Glottolog: bina1273

Binahari is a Papuan language of New Guinea. Binahari-Ma is a dialect or a closely related language.
