= Laua language =

Extinct language of Papua New Guinea

Laua
- Native to: Papua New Guinea
- Region: Central Province (Papua New Guinea)
- Extinct: 1990s
- Language family: Trans–New Guinea: Mailuan; Laua

Language codes
- ISO 639-3: luf
- Glottolog: laua1245
- ELP: Laua
- Laua is classified as Critically Endangered by the UNESCO Atlas of the World's Languages in Danger.

Laua, also known as Labu, is an extinct Mailuan language of Papua New Guinea. It was spoken in the Central Province, north and west of Laua according to Ethnologue. Laua had only one remaining speaker in 1987, and became extinct shortly after.
