= Bongu language =

Madang language of Papua New Guinea

Bongu
- Native to: Papua New Guinea
- Region: Madang Province
- Native speakers: (850 cited 2000 census)
- Language family: Trans–New Guinea?: Madang; Mindjim; Bongu

Language codes
- ISO 639-3: bpu
- Glottolog: bong1291

Bongu is a Madang language spoken in Madang Province, Papua New Guinea.

== Examples of words ==
=== Russian loan words ===
Unlike other indigenous languages of Oceania, the Bongu language has several loan words from Russian.

Bongu	English	Russian
arbuz	watermelon	арбуз
kukuruza	corn	кукуруза
topor	axe	топор
