= Dagan languages =

Language family of Papua New Guinea

Dagan
- Meneao Range
- Geographic distribution: Meneao Range, southeastern peninsula of Papua New Guinea: Central Province and Milne Bay Province
- Linguistic classification: Trans–New Guinea: Papuan Peninsula; Dagan

Language codes
- Glottolog: daga1274

The Dagan or Meneao Range languages are a small family of Trans–New Guinea languages spoken in the Meneao Range of the "Bird's Tail" (southeastern peninsula) of New Guinea, the easternmost Papuan languages on the mainland. They are the most divergent of the several small families within the Southeast Papuan branch of Trans–New Guinea.

== Languages ==
The languages are:

- Onjob
- Southwest
  - Daga
  - Maiwa language, Mapena
- East
  - Southeast: Ginuman, Kanasi (Sona)
  - Northeast: Dima (Jimajima), Umanakaina (Gwedena), and the nearly extinct Turaka

Although clearly related, they are not particularly close. Umanakaina and Ginuman, for example, are only 23% lexically similar.

== Pronouns ==
Usher (2020) reconstructs the pronouns as:

	sg	pl
1	*n[e/a]	*nu
2	*g[e/a]	*j[e/a]
3	*me	*mV

== Vocabulary comparison ==
The following basic vocabulary words are from SIL field notes (1965, 1967, 1973), as cited in the Trans-New Guinea database.

The words cited constitute translation equivalents, whether they are cognate (e.g. giana, ginewa, ginawa for “nose”) or not (e.g. iyawa, neigin, ɛbu for “road”).

gloss	Dima	Daga	Maiwa
head	una	iwa	k^{w}i'.unwa; kuiyunwa
hair	deba	igumewa	gu'mawa; ^{h}uiawa
ear	taii(na)	darinewa	na^{u}'nawa; naunáwa
eye	yamana	yamewa	yaŋganwa; yaŋ'ganwa
nose	giana	ginewa	ginawa; gi'nunwa
tooth	wari(na)	nodonewa	do'nawa; donáwa
tongue	pepa(na)	mɛriwa	p^{h}ed'nawa; ped^{t} nawa
leg	wana		ai'raniwa; beawa
louse	igu	kuisin	k^{wh}i'sin; nagam; usiwa
dog	kwegawa	eao	k^{wh}e'.a^{u}; kueyao
pig	boro	tuan	'bui
bird	midiwari	nɛnip	nenip; ve'k^{h}æt^{h}u
egg	dodopi	bagua	ba'giwa; gat toda; kokorek bagiwa
blood	tawayana	dɛnip	di
bone	(e)regura	kaemewa	mařɛt'nawa
skin	etona	ɛpiwa	koápiwa; p^{h}a'p^{h}unwa
breast	ama	amewa	am
tree	na	oma	i; ioma
man	apana	apan	apan; a'p^{h}an
woman	wawina	oaen	ve'sin; wɛsin
sun	gabudara	oam	kum; k^{h}um
moon	dede	siragam	dut; dut^{h}
water	oa	kaum	ioi; yo^{i}
fire	iarema	oma	íam; yaŋ'gawa
stone	akima	agim	agim; 'agim
road, path	iyawa	neigin	ɛbu; 'ɛbu
name	ewani	yaoa	i'vi wa
eat		naiwan	mɛ 'nane; naiwi
one	daiida	daiton	desi'řoe; désirom
two	uri	dɛrɛ	dúam; duːʌm

== Evolution ==
Dagan reflexes of proto-Trans-New Guinea (pTNG) etyma:

Daga language:

- ama 'breast' < *amu
- meri (nawa) 'tongue' < *me(l,n)e
- ira 'tree' < *inda

Kanasi language:

- asi 'ear' < *kand(e,i)k(V]
- etepa 'bark' < *(ŋg,k)a(nd,t)apu 'skin'
- obosa 'wind' < *kumbutu
- oman 'stone' < *ka(m,mb)u[CV]
- nene 'bird' < *n(e)i
