= Dima language =

Papuan language of New Guinea

Dima
- Jimajima
- Native to: Papua New Guinea
- Region: Milne Bay Province
- Native speakers: (750 cited 2001)
- Language family: Trans–New Guinea: Dagan; Dima

Language codes
- ISO 639-3: jma
- Glottolog: dima1252

Dima is a Papuan language of New Guinea.

== Vocabulary ==
A word list of Dima can be found in Ray (1938).
