= Makayam language =

Trans–New Guinea language spoken in Papua New Guinea

Makayam
- Tirio
- Aturu
- Native to: Papua New Guinea
- Native speakers: 1,300 (2003)
- Language family: Trans–New Guinea: Fly River (Anim); Tirio; Makayam
- Dialects: Giribam

Language codes
- ISO 639-3: aup
- Glottolog: maka1315

Tirio (a.k.a. Makayam [Makaeyam] and Aturu [Adulu, Atura]) is a Papuan language of Western Province, Papua New Guinea. The Giribam 'dialect' may be a distinct language.

Makayam is spoken in Aduru (8.388034°S 143.011167°E), Lewada (8.335225°S 142.780449°E), Suame (8.352359°S 142.554118°E), and Sumogi Island villages of Gogodala Rural LLG. The Giribam dialect is spoken in Janor village (8.431915°S 142.678616°E) of Oriomo-Bituri Rural LLG.

== Pronouns ==
Pronouns are:

	sg	pl
1	no-gao	gai-ga
2	o-gao	zo-gao
3	igi	i-ga

No-, o-, zo-, i- may reflect proto-Trans–New Guinea *na, *ga, *ja, *i.
