= Tirio languages =

Family of Trans–New Guinea languages

Tirio
- Lower Fly River
- Geographic distribution: New Guinea
- Linguistic classification: Trans–New Guinea: Anim (Fly River); Tirio

Language codes
- ISO 639-3: –
- Glottolog: tiri1259
- Map: The Tirio languages of New Guinea The Tirio languages Other Trans–New Guinea languages Other Papuan languages Austronesian languages Uninhabited

The Tirio languages are a family of Trans–New Guinea languages in the classification of Malcolm Ross. The Tirio languages have about 40% of their lexicon in common.

== Languages ==
- Baramu
- Bitur (Mutum)
- Tirio (Makayam, Aturu)
- Were (Kiunum)

Evans (2018) lists the Tirio languages as:

- Tirio (Makayam)
- Bitur (Paswam, Mutum)
- Lewada-Dewara, spoken on Dewala village on Sumogi Island
- Adulu (Aturu), also spoken on Sumogi Island

Baramu is somewhat more divergent in vocabulary, but this may reflect language contact rather than divergence in its position within the family. Pronouns are only available for Tirio itself (Makayam).

The moribund language Abom was once classified as a divergent Tirio language, sharing only an eighth of its lexicon with the others, but it turns out to not belong to the family at all, nor to the Anim family that Tirio is a branch of.

A survey of the Tirio languages can be found in Jore and Alemán (2002).

== Phonemes ==
Usher (2020) reconstructs the consonant inventory as follows:

*m	*n		
*p	*t		*k
*mb	*nd		*ŋg
	*s		
*w	*ɾ	*j	*ɣ

Vowels are *a *e *i *o *u.

== Pronouns ==
The pronouns are:

	sg	pl
1	*naoɣ	*naoj
2	*ɣaoɣ	*jaoɣ
3m	*igi	*jiɣ
3f	–	*jiɣ

== Evolution ==
Lower Fly River (Makayam and Baramu) reflexes of proto-Trans-New Guinea (pTNG) etyma:

- Makayam makoːth, Baramu mangoːt ‘chin’ < *maŋgat[a] ‘mouth, teeth’
- Makayam (Giribam dialect) Bitur, Baramu moːm ‘seed’ < *maŋgV ‘fruit, seed, round’
- Makayam sakoa ‘lower arm’, Baramu saga ‘arm’ < *sa(ŋg,k)(a,i)l ‘hand, claw’
