= Siroi language =

Language of Papua New Guinea

Siroi
- Native to: Papua New Guinea
- Region: Madang Province
- Native speakers: 1,300 (2003)
- Language family: Trans–New Guinea: Madang; Rai Coast; Kabenau; Siroi

Language codes
- ISO 639-3: ssd
- Glottolog: siro1249

Siroi (Suroi) is a Rai Coast language spoken in Madang Province, Papua New Guinea, and a local trade language. It is spoken in Kumisanger village (5.49683°S 145.997999°E), Astrolabe Bay Rural LLG, Madang Province.
