= Yareba language =

Language of Papua New Guinea

Yareba
- Region: Papua New Guinea: Ijitivari and Popondetta districts
- Native speakers: (1,200 cited 2000)
- Language family: Trans–New Guinea: Yareban; Nawaru–Yareba; Yareba

Language codes
- ISO 639-3: yrb
- Glottolog: yare1248

Yareba, or Middle Musa, is a language of Papua New Guinea.

== Phonology ==
Yareba has 15 phonemic consonants and 5 monophthongs.

Consonants
| | | Labial | Coronal | Dorsal |
|---|---|---|---|---|
| Nasal | | m | n | |
| Stop | Voiceless | | t | k |
| Stop | Voiced | b | d | g |
| Affricate | | | dz | |
| Fricative | | ɸ | s | |
| Glide | | w | | j |
| Flap | | | ɾ | |

| | Front | Central | Back |
|---|---|---|---|
| Close | i | | u |
| Mid | e̞ | | o̞ |
| Open | | ä | |

- /t/ and /k/ are aspirated.
- /dz/ can be pronounced [dz], [dʒ], and [z].
- /ɾ/ can be pronounced [ɾ] or [ɺ].
- /w/ is [β] next to /i/ and /e/, [w] between [a] and [ai], and [v] elsewhere.

Yareba allows for the diphthongs ai, au, oi, ou, ei, ui, ua, ue.
