= Mountain Koiali language =

Koiarian language spoken in Papua New Guinea

Mountain Koiari
- Region: Oro Province, Papua New Guinea
- Ethnicity: Koiari people
- Native speakers: (Mountain Koiari: 4,000? cited 2000 census); Biage: 1,100
- Language family: Trans–New Guinea: Koiarian; Koiaric; Mountain Koiari

Language codes
- ISO 639-3: Either: kpx – Mountain Koiali bdf – Biage
- Glottolog: moun1252 Mountain Koiali

Mountain Koiari (Koiali) is a language of Oro Province and Central Province, Papua New Guinea. It is not very similar to the other language which shares its name, Grass Koiari. Half of its speakers are monolingual.

It is spoken in Barai, Efogi (9.156234°S 147.665661°E), and Koiari villages of Koiari Rural LLG, as well as in Hiri Rural LLG.

== Phonology ==
=== Consonants ===
	Labial	Alveolar	Velar
Plosive	b	t d	k ɡ
Fricative	ɸ	s	x
Nasal	m	n	
Approximant		l	

- /ɸ, x/ can be voiced as [β, ɣ] in word-medial position.
- /t, l/ can be lenited as [ɾ, z] in word-medial position.

=== Vowels ===
	Front	Central	Back
High	i		u
Mid	e		o
Low		a	
