= Were language =

Trans–New Guinea language spoken in Papua New Guinea

Were
- Kiunum
- Weredai
- Native to: Papua New Guinea
- Native speakers: 700 (2002)
- Language family: Trans–New Guinea: Fly River (Anim); Tirio; Tirio–Bitur–Were; Were

Language codes
- ISO 639-3: wei
- Glottolog: were1244

Were (Weredai), or Kiunum, is a Papuan language spoken in Dewara village (8.374194°S 142.45638°E), Gogodala Rural LLG, Western Province, Papua New Guinea.
