= Grass Koiari language =

Papuan language

Grass Koiari
- Region: Papua New Guinea
- Ethnicity: Koiari people
- Native speakers: (1,700 cited 2000)
- Language family: Trans–New Guinea: Koiarian; Koiaric; Koita-Koirari; Grass Koiari

Language codes
- ISO 639-3: kbk
- Glottolog: gras1249
- ELP: Grass Koiari
- Grass Koiari is classified as Vulnerable by the UNESCO Atlas of the World's Languages in Danger.

Grass Koiari (Koiali) is a Papuan language of Papua New Guinea spoken in the inland Port Moresby area. It is not very close to the other language which shares its name, Mountain Koiali. It is considered a threatened language.

Most speakers are located in the north-eastern portion of Port Moresby, others present in the headwaters of Hunter River and Musgrave River as well as in the Motu villages of Tubuseleia, Barakau, and Gaile.

== Dialects ==
Koiari has two main dialects, the Western dialect and the Eastern dialect, which is also split into two sub-dialects, the north-eastern and south-eastern dialects.

The dialects share phonology and vocabulary with a few minor differences.

== Phonology ==
The phonology of Grass Koiari can be described as simple; it has all open syllables, and lacks unusual vowels and consonants and complex consonant clusters.

=== Phonemes ===
==== Vowels ====
	front	central	back
high	i		u
mid	e		o
low		a	

==== Consonants ====
		Bilabial	Alveolar	Velar	Glottal
Stop	voiceless		t	k	
Stop	voiced	b	d	ɡ	
Fricative	voiceless	ɸ	s		h
Fricative	voiced	β			
Nasal		m	n		
Vibrant			ɾ		
Semivowel			j		

=== Syllable structure ===
The two types of syllables that occur are V (vowel) and CV (consonant-vowel). Sequences of vowels are interpreted as glides rather than diphthongs. No closed syllables or consonant clusters are present.

=== Morphophonemics ===
Morphophonemic alternations are missing from the language, although there are morphophonemic and metrical production rules present when suffixes are added.

The morphophonemic rules are compulsory and are as follows:

1. In verbs with suffixes beginning with a consonant, the final vowel changes to /i/; the exception being if the final vowel is /u/ or the suffixes begin with /n/ or /r/. In the latter case there is no change.
2. When a stem precedes a suffix beginning with a vowel, the final vowel of the stem is omitted, excluding certain cases.

The metrical production rules are non-compulsory, circumstantial rules used to speakers discretion.

1. In cases where word boundaries are crossed, final vowels are omitted before initial vowels. This is most commonly applied when demonstratives, personal pronouns, certain specifiers, and reduplications are used. Does not apply to monosyllabic words or when the final and initial vowels are the same.
  - e.g. 'ata 'eke (that man) becomes a'teke.
2. In certain words or environments, voiced bilabial consonants and /r/ are omitted.
  - e.g. gurama (sit down) becomes guama..

=== Stress and rhythm ===
Stress is phonemic but placement rules can vary from word to word.

Verbs have different stressing rules compared to other word classes; they are stressed depending on whether they are a true or derived verb and which suffixes are present. Generally, the stress is placed in their root's initial syllable then the syllable containing the penultimate consonant.

In mono or disyllabic roots, stress is placed on the first syllable. In trisyllabic roots, stress is placed on the syllable in the penultimate consonant, or if not present, the first syllable. In roots containing four or more syllables, stress is placed on both the first syllable and the syllable in the penultimate consonant.

The rhythm of sentences is affected by the speaker; the two factors being tentative pauses and the application of metrical production rules.

=== Intonation ===
There are six contrastive patterns of intonation, and their contour can be described through prenuclear and nuclear contour and 4 levels of pitch; with 1 being the highest and 4 being the lowest.

1. Listing pattern
  - high prenuclear; drop to level 3; nuclear contour
2. Question pattern
  - level 2 prenuclear; drop to level 3
3. Statements and answers to questions - pattern
  - 2/3 repeated prenuclear contour; 2-3/4 nuclear
4. Imperative contour
  - level 2 OR; level 2 - level 3 - level 4
5. Continuation contour
  - level 1
6. Arresting imperative contour
  - initial high level 2; step down level 2;

== Grammar ==
=== Morphology ===
==== Specifiers ====
Koiari specifiers act as a set of morphemes that draws focus to the constituents on which they occur, and that occur on the constituents only when certain conditions are met.

Specifier forms can be singular or plural and be applied to declarative or question sentences. E represents a morphophoneme that is depending on the word class.

	Singular	Plural
Declarative	-rE	-yabE
Declarative	-varE	-yabE
Declarative	-vahE	-yabE
Declarative	-gE	-yabE
Declarative	-ikE	-ikE
Question	-nE	-yanE
Question	-vanE	-yanE
Question	vahenE	-yanE
Question	-genE	-yanE
Question	-ikenE	-ikenE

The morphophoneme <rE> is applied to disyllabic nouns, proper nouns, possessive nouns, and some descriptive words; <varE> is applied to polysyllabic nouns greater than two; <vahE> to adjectives and partially possessive nouns; <gE> to adverbs, propositions, and certain numerals; <ikE> to pronouns.

Specifiers occur on all basic sentences and discourse connectives and are always placed on a constituent's last element. In the case of questions, they are placed on the questioned element, and in verbal sentences their placement and abundance relying on word order.

Specifiers do not occur on certain negatives, modal particles, honorifics, conjunctions, interjections, short answers, and certain verb suffixes.

==== Derivational morphology ====
There are three derivational suffixes, -te, -va, and -ra, that are applied to the roots of verbs to synthesize new roots that express states.

- e.g. bokovanu ([x] broke it) to bokoravanu (it is broken) to bokoraruhanua (they're broken).

==== Word classes ====
Word classes are divided in Grass Koiari into verbs and non-verbs. Non-verbs are then divided further into categories such as nouns, adjectives, adverbs, etc. The division between verbs and non-verbs is based on formal grounds, rather than semantic grounds.

===== Verbs =====
Verbs are morphologically the most complex constituents in Grass Koiari. They function as the predicate in clauses and must occur with a subject; a verb alone cannot serve as a sentence. Inflection occurs more commonly on verbs than any other word class. Inflection manifests as a suffix, and verbal inflection suffixes depend on the position of the verb; medial position, which relates the preceding and following clauses, or final position, which indicates tenses and numbers.

===== Non-verbs =====
- Nouns
- Adjectives
- Adverbs
- Modals
- Demonstratives
- Pronouns
- Postpositions
- Quantifiers
- Intensifiers
- Limiters
- Negatives
- Question Tags
- Honorifics
- Conjunctions
- Discourse Connectives
- Interjections

=== Syntax ===
==== Noun phrases ====
In Grass Koiari, noun phrases are simple, complex or compound.

===== Simple noun phrases =====
Simple noun phrases are created by adding a post or prenominal modifier to a noun head. Prenominal modifiers consist of pronouns, certain adjectives, participial and relative clause modifiers, and other nouns. Post nominal modifiers consist of most adjectives, demonstratives, quantifiers, and limiters. The post nominal modifiers must be in the listed order in the case that more than one is present.

===== Complex noun phrases =====
If a noun phrase involves relative clauses embedded in possessive noun phrases, it may be complex.

===== Compound noun phrases =====
Complex and simple noun phrases may be joined by the -gE specifier to form compound noun phrases.

==== Clauses ====
Grass Koirari is a SOV (subject object verb) language, with the verb being the morphological reflector of the number of core arguments and postpositions being the reflector of the peripheral arguments. The basic structure is a subject argument, which must be explicitly stated, a subject pronoun at a minimum, and a verb.

subjects precede objects and may be separated from each other and the verb by peripheral arguments and other constituents such as negatives and modals which have locations they need to be in

Subjects precede objects, and peripheral arguments and other constituents, such as modals and negatives may separate them from both the verb and each other. The peripheral arguments and constituents are usually placed in certain favored locations in the clause.

===== Independent and dependent clauses =====
There are two types of clauses in grass koiari and are differentiated by their ability to stand alone as self-contained structures.

===== Clause chaining =====
Clauses can be connected together to form long chains, the Papuan language equivalent of a paragraph. The participants in these chains are tracked using suffixes.
