= Sam language =

Mandang language spoken in Papua Ne Guinea

Sam
- Songum
- Native to: Papua New Guinea
- Region: Madang Province
- Native speakers: 700 (2003)
- Language family: Trans–New Guinea?: Madang; Mindjim; Sam

Language codes
- ISO 639-3: snx
- Glottolog: samm1244

Sam, or Songum, is a Madang language spoken in Madang Province, Papua New Guinea.

It is spoken in Songum (5.50779°S 145.851042°E), Buan, and Wongbe villages in Astrolabe Bay Rural LLG.

'Sam' is the word for 'language'. 'Songum' is a village name.

== Phonology ==
=== Consonants ===
	Bilabial	Alveolar	Palatal	Velar	Glottal
Plosive	p b	t d		k ɡ	ʔ <x>
Nasal	m	n	ɲ <ɳ>	ŋ	
Trill		r <rr>			
Tap/flap		ɾ <r>			
Fricative		s			h
Approximant			j <y>		
Lateral approx.		l			

=== Vowels ===
	Front	Central	Back
Close	i		u
Mid	e		o
Open		a	
