= Gogodala–Suki languages =

Papuan language family

Gogodala–Suki
- Suki – Aramia River
- Geographic distribution: Aramia River region, Western Province, Papua New Guinea
- Linguistic classification: Papuan Gulf ?: Gogodala–Suki
- Subdivisions: Gogodala; Suki

Language codes
- Glottolog: suki1244
- Map: The Gogodala–Suki languages of New Guinea The Gogodala–Suki languages Trans–New Guinea languages Other Papuan languages Austronesian languages Uninhabited

The Gogodala–Suki or Suki – Aramia River languages are a small language family of Papua New Guinea, spoken in the region of the Aramia River.

== Languages ==
The languages are:

- Gogodala–Suki family
  - Suki language
  - Gogodala (Aramia River) branch:
    - Gogodala
    - Ari
    - Waruna

Gogodala–Suki languages and respective demographic information listed by Evans (2018) are provided below.

List of Gogodala–Suki languages
Language	Location	Population
Suki	north-central Morehead Rural LLG	3,500
Gogodala	Gogodala Rural LLG	26,000
Ari	Gogodala Rural LLG	?
Waruna	Gogodala Rural LLG	?

== Proto-language ==
=== Phonology ===
The reconstructed sound system is,

*m	*n	
*p	*t	*k
*b	*d	*g
	*s	
	?*r	

It is unclear if there were phonemes *w or *j distinct from *u and *i.

*i		*u
*e		*o
*ɛ		
	*a	

=== Pronouns ===
Free pronouns
	singular	plural
1st person	*nɛ	*sɛ
2nd person	*ɛ	*dɛ
3rd person	*o(-b)	?

Object prefixes
	singular	plural
1st person	*n-	*s-
2nd person	*-	*d-
3rd person	*-	*d-

(2SG and 3SG is zero.)

=== Lexicon ===
Proto-Suki–Aramia (i.e., Proto-Gogodala–Suki) lexical reconstructions by Usher (2020) are:

gloss	Proto-Suki-Aramia
1SG	*nɛ
2SG	*ɛ
3SG	*o(-b)
1PL	*sɛ
2PL	*dɛ
again	*goarma
and/with	*da
animate ref.	*-te
be/live	*e[r]
breast	*bu
eat	*na
fat/grease	*sap[e/ɛ]
fire	*ir[a]
garden	*ega[d]
girl	*sua
give to 3SG	*ata
heavy	*mene
know	*it[a/o]ua
language	*gi
leaf	*bagu
locative	*-m
louse	*amu
man	*dar[o/a]
mouth	*magat
night	*is[ɛ/a]
nose	*min
other	*et[a/o]
path	*na...
penis	*o
see	*ti
skin/bark	*kakar
stative	*-[V]taka
tail	*uani
this/here	*mɛ-m
tooth	*poso
tree	*[e]i
wallaby/meat	*[u]kapu
what?/who?	*p[a]oa
where?/to	*bɛ
wing	*it[e/a]
woman	*ato
yesterday/tomorrow	*[ɛ/a]n[ɛ/a]p

== Vocabulary comparison ==
The following basic vocabulary words are from McElhanon & Voorhoeve (1970), Voorhoeve (1970), and Reesink (1976), as cited in the Trans-New Guinea database.

The words cited constitute translation equivalents, whether they are cognate (e.g. atogi, ato, atu for “woman”) or not (e.g. mɛnəpila, poso, tamki for “tooth”).

gloss	Ari	Gogodala	Suki
head	gabi	ganabi	tibodu
hair	tiːta	tita	nigbagu
ear	etubada; kɛso	igibi	iakadgu
eye	tokodaba	tao	itumku
nose	ndogu	mina	umuku
tooth	mɛnəpila	poso	tamki
tongue		mɛlɛpila	
leg	gupi		
louse	ikami	ami	daka
dog	sokɛ	soke	ebme
pig		uai	kuainu
bird	soma		
egg	momona		
blood	dede		
bone	mboige	gosa	budu
skin	kakala; puka	kaka	kaka
breast	omo	omo	
tree	yei		riku
man	dalagi	dala; dalagi	daru; guargia
woman	atogi	ato; susɛgi	atu
sun	gadepa	kadɛpa	kamgu
moon	tɔkɔ		
water	ogo	wi	
fire	awa	ila	araka
stone	-nadi		
road, path	nape	nabidi	napru; rapru
name	enoma	gagi	yaka
eat	na-	na	
one	maitaia		
two	saki		

== Evolution ==
Gogodalic-Suki formed a branch of Trans–New Guinea languages in the classification of Malcolm Ross. Possible reflexes of proto-Trans-New Guinea (pTNG) etyma are:

Gogodala language:

- omo ‘breast’ < *amu
- magata ‘mouth, jaw’ < *maŋgat[a]
- mele-pila ‘tongue’ < *mele-mbilaŋ
- imu ‘eye’ < *(ŋg,k)amu
- mi ‘louse’ < *iman, *niman
- kadepa ‘sun’ < *kand(a,e)pa
- ila ‘tree, fire’ < *inda
- na- ‘eat’ < *na-
- mana- ‘sit, stay’ < *mVna-

Suki language:

- gigoa ‘cassowary’ < *ku(y)a
- na- ‘eat’ < *na-
