= Gogodala Rural LLG =

Local-level government in Papua New Guinea

- District map of Western Province

- Location within Papua New Guinea
- Coordinates: 8.06°S 142.69°E
- Country: Papua New Guinea
- Province: Western Province
- Time zone: UTC+10 (AEST)

Gogodala Rural LLG is a local-level government (LLG) of Western Province, Papua New Guinea. The Gogodala-Suki languages, Dibiyaso, and Turumsa are mostly spoken within this LLG.

== Wards ==
- 01. Ali
- 02. Makapa (Turumsa language and Dibiyaso language speakers)
- 03. Isago
- 04. Pikiwa (Dibiyaso language speakers)
- 05. Wasapea (Kamula language speakers)
- 06. Pisi
- 07. Semabo
- 08. Awaba
- 09. Dadi
- 10. Aketa
- 11. Kawito Station
- 12. Kotale
- 13. Kewa
- 14. Tai
- 15. Dogona
- 16. Adiba
- 17. Yau
- 18. Ike
- 19. Kini
- 20. Waligi
- 21. Kimama
- 22. Bamutsa (Dibiyaso language speakers)
- 23. Uladu
- 24. Ugu
- 25. Kenewa
- 26. Waya
- 27. Kubu
- 28. Duaba
- 29. Konedobu
- 30. Pagona
- 31. Dede
- 32. Sialoa
- 33. Kawiyapo
- 34. Uric
- 35. Aduru (Makayam language speakers)
- 36. Baramula (Baramu language speakers)
- 37. Tapila (Abom language and Baramu language speakers)
- 38. Lewada (Abom language and Makayam language speakers)
- 39. Dewara (Abom language and Were language speakers)
