= Kunja language (Papuan) =

Papuan language of New Guinea

Kunja
- Peremka
- Lower Morehead
- Region: Western Province, Papua New Guinea
- Ethnicity: 400 (2000 census)
- Native speakers: 350 (2018)
- Language family: Trans-Fly – Bulaka River?: Yam; Tonda; Kunja
- Dialects: Kémä; Kánchá

Language codes
- ISO 639-3: pep
- Glottolog: kunj1246

Kunja (Kánchá), also known as Lower Morehead or Peremka, is a Papuan language of New Guinea.
