= Yareban languages =

Trans–New Guinea language group

Yareban
- Musa River
- Geographic distribution: Southeastern peninsula of Papua New Guinea: Oro Province
- Linguistic classification: Trans–New Guinea: Papuan Peninsula; Owen Stanley Range; Mailu–Yareban; Yareban

Language codes
- Glottolog: yare1250

The Yareban or Musa River languages are a small family of Trans–New Guinea languages spoken near the Musa River in the "Bird's Tail" (southeastern peninsula) of New Guinea. They are classified within the Southeast Papuan branch of Trans–New Guinea.

== Languages ==
The languages are,

- Moikodi (Doriri)
- Aneme Wake (Abia)
- Barijian: Bariji, Nawaru (Sirio)
- Yareba

Barijian is suggested by lexicostatistics in Dutton (1971).

The only pronouns which are known in enough languages to reconstruct are na 1sg and a 2sg, which are common to all Yareban languages.

== Proto-language ==
=== Phonemes ===
Usher (2020) reconstructs the consonant inventory as follows:

*m	*n			
*pʰ	*tʰ	[*s]	*kʰ	*ʔ
*b	*d	[*dz]	[*g]	
*w	*ɾ	*j		

*s and *dz were acquired through loans, but may have already been present in the protolanguage. *ʔ and *g may have been allophones.

Vowels are *a *e *i *o *u.

=== Pronouns ===
Usher (2020) reconstructs the pronouns as:

	sg	du	pl
1excl	*na		*ewa
1incl	*na	*uwa	*i[j]a
2	*a		*ja
3	*dawa		*ema(wa)

=== Basic vocabulary ===
Some lexical reconstructions by Usher (2020) are:

gloss	Proto-Musa River
head	*bo-tai
hair/feather	*idi
ear	*ome
eye	*nai-tai
nose	*iboʔo
tooth	*ni[ʔ]o
tongue	*meana
foot/leg	*buɾi
blood/salt	*iwa
bone	*tai
skin/bark	*ope
breast	*ama
louse	*uʔa
dog	*kua
pig	*boɾo
bird	*gasiɾa; *ada
egg	*baka; *uɾimi
tree	*ana
man/person	*e[ʔe]me
woman/wife	*aweta
sun	*eweaka
moon	*maɾabe; *sakaɾa
water	*adua
fire	*inaʔa
stone	*oma; *gebiɾo
path	*daʔaba
name	*ibi
eat/drink	*it-
one	*demu

== Evolution ==
Yareban reflexes of proto-Trans-New Guinea (pTNG) etyma are:

Yareba language:

- ama ‘breast’ < *amu
- uyau ‘cassowary’ < *ku(y)a
- rarara ‘dry’ < *(ŋg,k)atata
- baba ‘father’ < *mbapa
- iji ‘hair’ < *iti[C]
- ifu ‘name’ < *imbi
- kofiti ‘head’ < *kV(mb,p)(i,u)tu
- ogo ‘water’ < *ok[V]
- eme ‘man’ < *ambi

Abia language:

- amai ‘mother’ < *am(a,i)
- sagai ‘sand’ < *sa(ŋg,k)asiŋ
