= Aneme Wake language =

Papuan language of Papua New Guinea

Aneme Wake
- Abia
- Native to: Papua New Guinea
- Region: Oro Province
- Native speakers: (650 cited 1990)
- Language family: Trans–New Guinea: Yareban; Moikodi–Abia; Aneme Wake

Language codes
- ISO 639-3: aby
- Glottolog: anem1248

Aneme Wake, or Abia, is a Papuan language spoken in Oro Province, in the Papuan Peninsula.
