= Tairuma language =

Eleman language spoken in Papua New Guinea

Tairuma
- Uaripi
- Native to: Papua New Guinea
- Region: Gulf Province
- Native speakers: 4,500 (2004)
- Language family: Trans–New Guinea: Eleman; nuclear Eleman; Eastern; Tairuma

Language codes
- ISO 639-3: uar
- Glottolog: tair1256

Tairuma, also known as Uaripi after its location, is a Trans–New Guinea language spoken in Uaripi (07°57′00″S 145°44′06″E) in Central Kerema Rural LLG, Gulf Province, Papua New Guinea.

A grammar of Tairuma was written by Ikamu and Jo in 2014.
