= Gogodala language =

Papuan language of Papua New Guinea

Gogodala
- Native to: Papua New Guinea
- Region: Western Province, north bank of Fly River, Aramia River. 301 villages.
- Ethnicity: Gogodala
- Native speakers: 22,000 (2004)
- Language family: Papuan Gulf ?: Gogodala–Suki; Gogodala; Gogodala

Language codes
- ISO 639-3: ggw
- Glottolog: gogo1265
- Coordinates: 8°5′S 142°52′E

Gogodala is a Papuan language of Papua New Guinea. Its closest relative is the Ari language.

== Phonology ==
Consonants
		Labial	Alveolar	Dorsal
Plosive	voiceless	p	t	k
Plosive	voiced	b	d	g
Nasal		m	n	
Fricative			s	
Liquid			l (ɾ)	
Glide		w		j

/k, s, l/ can have allophones [x, ᵗs, ɾ].

Vowels
	Front	Central	Back
High	i		u
Mid	e		o
Mid	ɛ		
Low		a	

/o, e, a/ can have allophones [ɔ, æ, ɑ].
