= Toaripi language =

Eleman language spoken in Papua New Guinea

Toaripi
- East Elema
- Native to: Papua New Guinea
- Region: Gulf Province
- Native speakers: (23,000 cited 1977)
- Language family: Trans–New Guinea: Eleman; nuclear Eleman; Eastern; Toaripi
- Dialects: Kaipi (Melaripi); Toaripi (Moripi-Iokea, Moveave); Sepoe

Language codes
- ISO 639-3: tqo
- Glottolog: toar1246

Toaripi, or East Elema, is a Trans–New Guinea language of Papua New Guinea.

== Phonology ==
=== Consonants ===
		Labial	Alveolar	Velar	Glottal
Nasal		m	n		
Plosive		p	t	k	
Fricative	voiceless	f	s		h
Fricative	voiced	v			
Rhotic			r		
Lateral			l		

=== Vowels ===
	Front	Central	Back
High	i		u
High-mid	e		o
Low-mid			ɔ
Low		a	
