= Proto-Trans–New Guinea language =

Reconstructed ancestor of the Trans–New Guinea languages

Proto-Trans–New Guinea
- PTNG
- Reconstruction of: Trans–New Guinea languages
- Region: New Guinea Highlands
- Lower-order reconstructions: Proto-Anim; Proto-Awyu–Ok; Proto-Momuna–Mek

Proto-Trans–New Guinea is the reconstructed proto-language ancestral to the Trans–New Guinea languages. Reconstructions have been proposed by Malcolm Ross and Andrew Pawley.

== Phonology ==
The symbols for particular proto-phonemes should not be taken to have constant phonetic values, as many modern TNG languages show considerable allophonic variation, especially in obstruents.

=== Consonants ===
The following consonant phonemes are reconstructed:

		Bilabial	Apical	Palatal	Velar
Nasal		*m	*n	*ɲ ⟨ñ⟩	*ŋ
Plosive/ Affricate	oral	*p	*t		*k
Plosive/ Affricate	prenasal	*ᵐb	*ⁿd	*ᶮdʒ ⟨ñj⟩	*ᵑg
Fricative			*s		
Approximant		*w	*l	*j ⟨y⟩	

- The precise phonetic realization of /*ᶮdʒ/ is unknown.

=== Vowels ===
The following vowel phonemes are reconstructed:

	Front	Central	Back
Close	*i		*u
Mid	*e		*o
Open		*a	

=== Phonotactics ===
It is likely that syllables had the shape (C)V initially, CV medially, and CV(C) finally. Consonant and vowel clusters were probably not allowed.

=== Suprasegmentals ===
The phonemic status of prosodic features (tone, pitch-accent, stress) remains uncertain.

== Pronouns ==
Ross reconstructs the following pronominal paradigm for Trans–New Guinea, with *a~*i ablaut for singular~non-singular:

I	*na	we	*ni
thou	*ga	you	*gi
s/he	*(y)a, *ua	they	*i

There is a related but less commonly attested form for 'we', *nu, as well as a *ja for 'you', which Ross speculates may have been a polite form. In addition, there were dual suffixes *-li and *-t, and a plural suffix *-nV, (i.e. n plus a vowel) as well as collective number suffixes *-pi- (dual) and *-m- (plural) that functioned as inclusive we when used in the first person. (Reflexes of the collective suffixes, however, are limited geographically to the central and eastern highlands, and so might not be as old as proto-Trans–New Guinea.)

== Morphology ==
Studies group Madang, Finisterre-Huon, and Kainantu-Goroka together as part of a larger Northeast New Guinea (NENG) group on the basis of morphological evidence, such as mutually reconstructable verbal suffixes that mark subject:

Proto-Northeast New Guinea subject-marking verbal suffixes

	singular	dual	plural
1st person	*-Vn	*-u(l,t)	*-un, *-i
2nd person	*-an	*-i(l,t)	*-ai, *-i, *-a
3rd person	*-a, *-i	*-i(l,t)	*-ai

Comparison of reconstructions of subject-marking verbal suffixes

	proto-Northeast New Guinea	proto-Madang	proto-Finisterre-Huon	proto-Kainantu-Goroka	Proto-Trans–New Guinea (tentative)
1sg	*-Vn	*-in	?	*-u	*-Vn
2sg	*-an	*-an,*-i	*-an	*-an	*-Vn
3sg	*-a,*-i	*-a,*-an	*-a,*-i	*-ai,*-i	*-a,*-i
1du	*-u(l,t)	-*-u(l,t)	*-u(l,t)	*-ur	*-u(l,t)
2/3du	*-i(l,t)	*-i(l,t)	*-i(l,t)	?	*-i(l,t)
1pl	*-un,*-i	*-un	*-un	*-un	
2/3pl	*-ai,*-i,*-a	*-ai,*-i	*-e,*-i	*-a	

== Lexicon ==
Lexical words, such as *niman 'louse', may also be reconstructed:

Reflexes of *niman 'louse', which attest to an intermediate *iman in the east:

Chimbu–Wahgi: Mid/Nuclear Wahgi numan
Engan: Enga & Kewa lema
Finisterre–Huon: Kâte imeŋ, Selepet imen
Gogodala mi
Kainantu–Goroka: Awa nu, Tairora nume, Fore numaa, Gende (tu)nima
Southern Kiwai nimo
Koiarian: Managalasi uma
Kolopom: Kimaghama nome, Riantana nome
Kwale nomone
Madang: Kalam yman, Watiwa (Rai Coast) im, Sirva (Adelbert) iima
Mek: Kosarek ami
Marori nemeŋk
Paniai Lakes: Ekari yame (metathesis?)
Timor–Alor–Pantar: Western Pantar (h)amiŋ, Oirata amin (metathesis?)
Wiru nomo

Questionable branches:

Pauwasi: Yafi yemar
Central Sentani mi

The Proto-Trans–New Guinea negative is reconstructed as *ma-. Negatives in Trans–New Guinea languages usually have either an mV- or nV- form.

- *mV (often *ma): Angaatɨha (Angan); Apalɨ, Waskia, Kalam (Madang); Kâte, Kombe (Finisterre-Huon)
- *na ~ *naa: Awara (Finisterre-Huon); Enga, Ku Waru, Middle Wahgi (Chimbu-Wahgi); Oksapmin

== Reconstructions ==
Proto-Trans-New Guinea reconstructions
body parts
arm, forearm	*mbena
belly, internal organs	*mundun
blood	*ke(nj,s)a
bone	*kondaC
brain	*muk[V]
breast	*amu
buttocks	*simbi + modifier
cheek	*mVkVm
claw, hand	*sikal or *sakil
ear	*kand(i,e)k[V]
excrement 1	[same as 'guts']
excrement 2	*ata
eye 1 (cf. egg 2)	*(ŋg,k)iti-maŋgV
eye 2	*ŋg(a,u)mu
eye 3	*nVpV
fingernail	*(mb,p)(i,u)t(iu)C
foot, lower leg	*k(a,o)nd(a,o)[C]
forehead, head	*mVtVna
guts, intestines, bowels	*sim(i,u), *simbi
hair 1	*(nd,s)umu(n,t)[V]
hair 2, leaf	*iti
head 1	*kV(mb,p)utu
head 2	*mVtVna
heart 1 (cf. belly, egg 2)	*mundu-maŋgV
heart 2	*simu
heart 3	*kamu
knee	*(ŋg,k)atuk
leg 1	*k(a,o)nd(a,o)[C]
leg 2, calf	*kitu
liver	*[ma]pVn
milk, sap	*muk
mouth, teeth	*maŋgat[a]
navel	*simu + modifier
neck 1	*k(a,e)(nd,t)ak
neck 2, nape, side of	*kuma(n,ŋ)[V]
nose	*mundu
penis	*mo
saliva	*si(mb,p)at[V]
shoulder	*kinV
skin	*(ŋg,k)a(nd,t)apu
testicles	*walaka
tongue 1	*mbilaŋ
tongue 2	*me(l,n)e
tooth 1	(see mouth)
tooth 2	*titi
urine	*[si]si, *siti, *pisi
kin terms
brother, older	*[mb]amba
father	*apa, *mbapa
grandparent	*apus[i]
husband, man	*ambi
mother, free form	*am(a,i,u)
mother, bound form	*na-
sibling, older	*nan(a,i)
sibling, older same sex	*[mb]amba
sister	*aya
age-gender and other social categories
baby	*ŋaŋa
boy	*nV
man, husband	*ambi
orphan, widow & child	*mbeŋga-masi
woman, female	*panV
birds, bird parts
bird 1	*n[e]i
bird 2	*yaka[i]
cassowary	*ku[y]a
egg 1	*mun(a,e,i)ka
egg 2, fruit, seed	*maŋgV
tail	*a(mb,m)u
wing	*mbutu
insects
butterfly	*apa[pa]ta
fly	*ŋgambu
louse	*niman, *iman
mosquito	*kasin
plants, plant parts
bark	*ka(nd,t)ap[u]
casuarina	*kal(a,i)pV
fruit, seed (cf. egg 2)	*maŋgV
leaf 1, hair	*iti
leaf 2	*sasak
root	*kindil
sap, milk	*muk
taro	*mV
tree, wood	*inda
inanimate world
ashes 1	*sumbu
ashes 2	*kambu-sumbu
ashes 3	*la(ŋg,k)a
cloud 1, sky	*samb[V]
cloud 2	*ka(mb,p)utu
fire 1	*k(a,o)nd(a,u)p
fire 2	*inda
fire 3	*kambu
flame	*mbalaŋ
ground 1	*man[a]
ground 2	*maka[n]
lightning, light	*(mb,m)elak
moon 1	*takVn[V]
moon 2	*kal(a,i)m
morning	*k(i,u)tuma + X
night	*k(i,u)tuma
sand	*sa(ŋg,k)asiŋ
sky 1, cloud	*samb[V]
thunder, sky 2	*kumut, *tumuk
smoke 1	*kambu(s,t)(a,u)
smoke 2	*kambu-la(ŋg,k)a
stone 1	*kamb(a,u)na
stone 2	*[na]muna
sun 1	*kamali
sun 2	*ketane
water 1	*ok[V]
water 2	*nok
wind 1	*kumbutu
wind 2, breeze	*pinVm
artefacts
axe	*tu
fence	*wati
netbag 1	*kun
netbag 2	*at(i,u)
string, rope	*asi
intangible cultural concepts
instructions, language, word, speech	*mana
mind, thought	*n(o,u)man
name 1	*imbi
name 2, who	*wani
shadow, spirit	*k(aw,o)nan
song, type of	*saŋ
witchcraft	*kum
independent pronouns (for subject, object, possessor)
1 singular	*na
2 singular	*ŋga
3 singular	*ya
3 singular	*wa
1 plural	*ni, *nu
1 plural	*ni
2 plural	*ŋgi, *ki
1 dual	*niLi, *nuLi
2 dual	*ŋgiLi, *kiLi
3 dual	*iLi
verbal suffixes marking person-number of subject
1 singular	*-Vn
2 singular	*-an
1 dual	*-uL
2/3 dual	*-iL
1 plural	*-un
1 singular different subject	*-pa
verbs
be (live, stay, sit)	*mVna-
bite	*s(i,u)-
blow	*pu + verb
break	*pa(ŋg,k)-
burn	*nd(a,e,i)-
burn, light a fire	*ki-
carry (on back, shoulder)	*kak(i,u)-
come	*me-
cook	*andu-
cut, chop	*tVk-
die	*kumV-
do, make	*ti-
dream	*kina(mb,p)-
eat, drink	*na-
fly, flutter	*putu(putu)-
give	*mV-
go 1	*pu-
go 2	*yata-
hit	*tu-
know, hear, see	*nVŋg-
laugh	*ŋgiti (+ verb)
live, be, sit	see 'be'
put	*(m,p)a(l,t)V-
say, speak	*nde-
see, know, perceive	*nVŋg-
shoot	*tVmV-
sleep 1, lie down	*kin(i,u)[m]
sleep 2	*p(e,i)t(e,i)o-
speak, talk	*nde-
spit	*kasipa-
stand	*t(a,e,i)k[V]-
swell	*su + verb
take	*(nd,t)a-
tie	*ndiŋga-, *ndaŋgi
turn (oneself)	*mbuli[ki] + verb
urinate	*X + *si- (urine + verb)
vomit	*mVŋ[g]V ti-
adjectives
blue	*muk[V]
cold	*kukam(o,u)
dry	*ŋgatata
full	*t(o,u)k(i,u) ti-
heavy	*kenda
long	*k(o,u)t(u,i)p
new	*kVtak
short	*tumba
straight	*tutu[tu]ku
conjunctions
and	*ito
negatives
not	*ma- (+ verb)
numerals
two	*ta(l,t)(a,e)

== Lexical comparison ==
Lexical comparison between Trans-New Guinean languages

Body parts
family	language	head	hair	ear	eye	nose	tooth	tongue	leg	blood	bone	skin	breast
Trans–New Guinea	Proto-Trans–New Guinea	*kobutu; *kV(mb,p)utu; *mUtUna; *mVtVna	*iti; *(nd,s)umu(n,t)[V]; *zumun	*ka(nd,t)(i,e)C; *kat(i,e)C; *tVmV(d)	*g(a,u)mu; *ŋg(a,u)mu; *(ŋg,k)iti [maŋgV]; *nVpV	*mundu; *mutu	*magata; *maŋgat[a]; *titi	*balaŋ; *mbilaŋ; *me(l,n)e; *me(n,l)e	*kani(n); *k(a,o)ond(a,o)C; *kitu	*ke(ñj,s)a; *kesa	*kondaC; *kwata(l,n)	*gatapu; *(ŋg,k)a(nd,t)apu	*amu
West Bomberai	Proto-Mbaham–Iha	*kaˈnda		*kʷⁱɛr						*wⁱɛk	*ˈtɔkar	*pak	*sɔn
Asmat–Kamoro	Proto-Asmat–Kamrau	*uɸu	*ɸini	*jiɸ[a/o]ne	*manaN	*miC	*siC	*komane	*mawu	*ese	*eake		*awo
Ok–Oksapmin	Proto-Ok-Oksapmin				*kiin	*(mu)duum		*fV(lV)ŋ		*xeim			
Greater Awyu	Proto-Awyu-Dumut	*kɑibɑn; *xaiban	*möxö; *muk; *ron	*turun	*kerop	*togut		*fɔgat; *fɔgɛt; *pogɑt		*gom		*kɑt; *xa(t)	*ɑm; *om
Kayagaric	Proto-Gondu River	*toxom	*upm	*itipaːm	*sakam	*jup	*o[x/ɣ]om	*maetap	*apit	*jes	*nomop	*pip	*etum
Kolopom	Proto-Kolopom	*tipV; *mVrV[w]	*muen[a]	? *mVrVk; *[ndz][o/u]an	*VnV	*ŋgon	*t[e]r[a]k	*mepreŋg		*iendz			*mam
Anim	Proto-Fly River				*kindV[C]		*kam	*sas			*mbai[a]ŋg; *ɸia[u]		
Anim	Proto-Inland Gulf	*gia		*tu; *jeja	*kuɸino	*dasi	*ta; *bese	*koda; *sasa	*idini		*ɸia	*nikopi; *ko[j]ipo	*jono
Anim	Proto-Lower Fly River		*duɾumə; *duɾum	*towap	*baɾid	*miw	*suwə; *kam; *su	*jimə; *jim		*nauɾə	*naɾak(ə); *baig		*bub
Anim	Proto-Marind	*pa		*kembet, *kambet	*kind	*aŋgi₂p	*maŋgat	*inum	*tegu	*do	*haiau, *hiau	*ugu	*bub
Marori	Morori	merao	pu		ayix		terox		tegu	ŋgorom	ŋgwar	par	
Gogodala-Suki	Gogodala	ganabi	tita	igibi	tao	mina	poso	mɛlɛpila			gosa	kaka	omo
Kiwaian	Proto-Kiwai	*kepuɾu	*mus[ua]	*gaɾe	*idomaɾi	*wodi	*ibo(-nVɾV)	*uototoɾo[p/b]e	*sakiɾo	*kaɾima; *sa[w]i	*soɾo	*tama	*amo
Paniai Lakes	Ekari (Paniai Lake dialect)	migo	iyo		peka	juma	egó	etá		emo	mitoo	kadó	ama
Dani	Dani, Lower Grand Valley (Tangma dialect)	mʋkkʋl-oak	nesi	nesakko	neil-ekken	namisaŋ	naik	namili		mep	noak	nakap	neilak
Somahai	Momuna	toko	toko-ate		otu		ija		i jo-ku	janɨ	toko	ke	
Mek	Proto-Mek		*p[ɔ]t[ɔ]ŋ	*aᵓ	*atiŋ		*jo̝	*se̝l[ija]mu	*jan	*e̝ne̝ŋ	*jɔk		*mɔᵘm
Awin-Pa	Proto-Kamula-Elevala	*ke̝ba		*m[ɔ/o̝]d[ɔ/o̝]	*kinɔ	*kine̝	*bate̝	*taⁱ	*tama		*ke̝dɔ		
East Strickland	Gobasi	ulʌkib	o dɔsɔ	dulo	hiɔ̃	mina	mɔi	ili	hɔma	sõho	kib	kɔlɔf	tɔnu
Duna-Bogaya	Duna	kuni	hini	kɔhane; konane	le	kuma	ne; nee	ogone; ɔgɔne	tia	kuyila	kuni	pulu	abu; adu; amu
Duna-Bogaya	Bogaya	yeľʌ; yela	heepi; yeľʌ eľika	hona; hɔnʌn	kina; ki:nʌn	kuuma; pfouľu	yagai; yʌkʌi	iki; ɩkin	yehei; yehʌi	sokoya; yesʌ	hakale; hʌv̧ʌľe	hugwa; hukuʌn	alu; ʌľu
Bosavi	Kaluli	mise; misẽ	misẽ fɔ̃; mise foon	kenẽ; malo	si	migi	beso; bis	eʌn; sano	gidaafoo; gip	hɔbɔ; hooboo	ki	dɔgɔf; toogoof}	bo; bu
Kutubu	Proto-Lake Kutubu	*uni	*iti		*hʲĩ	*sabe	*mete	*atu	*kotage		*kigi	*ga[o/u]	*hʲokõ
Enga-Kewa-Huli	Enga (Sari dialect)	aiyomba	iri	kale	lenge	lya	neŋge		moko	taiyoko	kuli	yoŋge	andu
Wiru	Wiru	tobou	pine; píne	kabidi	lene	timini	kime	keke; keké	kawa	kamate	tono	kepene	adu
Chimbu-Wahgi	Kuman	bit-na; bɩtiɩno	iŋguno; yungo	kina-na; kunano	gumutino; ongomit-na	guma-ne; gumano	siŋguno	dirambino	kati; kat-na	borɔmai; bořumai; maiam	yambiřo; yombura	gaŋgino	amu-na; amuno
Madang	Proto-Madang	*gat(a,i)(m)	*imunu	*kaun(i)	*amu	*mutu(gu)	*make	*mele	*kani(n)	*ka(d,r)a; *kara	*kwaten	*ga(n,r)a	*amu(na)
Finisterre	Mungkip	kʰige	sɨsa; sɪsa	maget; magitnɛ	dae; da·ge	miminɛ; mimiŋge	ma	mabɛm; mabim	kada	we·q	kwadi; kwadzi	girim	nom
Huon	Selepet	kun; kun-	somot; somot-	âdâp-; ɔndɔp	sen; sen-	hâme-; hɔme	sât-; sot	nibilam-; nimbilam		hep-	haǥit; hahit-	hâk-; hɔk	nam; nam-
Kainantu-Goroka	Proto-Eastern Kainantu-Goroka	*-'no-N; *pia-		*ä-Q-ra-N		*-hi-Q		*-mäpi-V		*nade-V			*nä-N
Kainantu-Goroka	Proto-Eastern Kainantu	*piᵄtɐ	*jɐᵘsi	*ɑːtoː	*wu	*ipi	*wɐⁱ	*m₂ɑːpiɾi	*ipu	*wi[ʔt]ipɐ	*muʔjɑːni		*nɑːNmɐ
Kainantu-Goroka	Proto-Northern Kainantu	*noːN	*jɐᵘ	*ɑːʔ	*u	*siʔ	*wɐj	*[m/n][ɐⁱ]piɾ	*tɐɾ	*nɑːɾeː	*(ɐ-)jɐNpɐ		*nɑːN
Angan	Simbari	minta	mindata	kaantɨka	sɨmta	sɨmputa	maanka	kwaavlɨlɨ	sɨwla	mɨnjaaka	yankinta	kɨlaaka	aamɨnta
Turama-Kikori	Proto-Rumu-Omati	*mab	*b[au]t	*go̝	*isĩ	*ju	*magu		*tãᵋ		*tab		*sõ̝
Goilalan	Fuyug	hul ha; ondobe	are; hul haluma	gadolo	hul li; im	hul hunga; unge	hul usi	hul asese	soga	tana	hude	hul hoda; ode	hul duda
Goilalan	Tauade	kɔrɔtɔ	awutu	kepapaí	tavai	ki:tʰ	nɔtɔvai	aivi	lɔ'vai	il'iví	keniví	kɔtipai	data
Greater Binanderean	Proto-Binandere	*ciro; *giti	*tu		*dibe; *diti		*di	*VwVwV		*ju; *or{a,o}rә	*bobo; *wetu	*tamә	*ami
Koiarian	Proto-Koiarian		*fómo		*ni	*uri				*taɣo		*vata	*amu
Kwalean	Proto-Kwalean (Ross)		*iku(va)		*(u)bu(i)vi(ma)	*ʒaʒore	*vono(ne); *wano(ne)			*ruu	*esi(ne)	*ahiri	*n(a)u(ne)
Kwalean	Proto-Humene-Uare (Usher)		*igu		*ubuma	*jajɔɾɛ	*ɣɔnɔnɛ	*majanɛ	*ɔda	*ɾɔo̝	*e̝tinɛ	*ahe̝ɾe̝	*nuunɛ
Manubaran	Proto-Manubaran (Ross)	*ada	*weʔia	*ane-ma	*ne(u)	*uru-ma	*gade	*afie	*[n,y]u-ka		*nena	*roʔ(o,a)	
Manubaran	Proto-Mount Brown (Usher)	*ada	*u[w]e[t/k]a	*anema	*ne	*uɾuma	*gade	*api[j]e		*daweʔa	*nena	*ɾoʔo	*sisu
Yareban	Proto-Musa River	*bo-tai	*idi	*ome	*nai-tai	*iboʔo	*ni[ʔ]o	*meana	*buɾi	*iwa	*tai	*ope	*ama
Mailuan	Mailu (Ilai dialect)	ilolo	liʔimu	ʔope	ini	durumu	maʔa	goba	ʔau	lala	kisa	ʔopi	ama
Dagan	Daga	iwa	igumewa	darinewa	yamewa	ginewa	nodonewa	mɛriwa		dɛnip	kaemewa	ɛpiwa	amewa

Nature
family	language	louse	dog	pig	bird	egg	tree	sun	moon	water	fire	stone	path
Trans-New Guinea	Proto-Trans-New Guinea	*niman			*n(e,i); *n(e)i; *n[e]i; *yak; *yaka[i]; *yanem	*maŋgV; *munaka; *mun(a,u)ka	*ida; *inda ~ *iñja	*kamali; *kamuli; *ketana	*kal(a,i)m; *kamali; *takVn; *takVn[V]	*nok; *(n)ok; *ok(u); *ok[V]	*inda; *k(a,e)dap; *k(a,e)(n,d)ap; *kambu; *k(a,o)nd(a,u)p	*kamb(a,u)na; *(na)muna; *[na]muna	
West Bomberai	Proto-Mbaham–Iha	*mɛⁱn	*jaˈmbar	*[ku]ˈndur		*wun	*wiˈra	*kaˈminV	*kaˈpas	*kiˈra		*war	
Asmat-Kamoro	Proto-Asmat-Kamrau	*amo	*juwuɾi	*oɸo		*[a]sa	*ose	*jawu	*buɾa	*m[oi/ui]	*usa	*jeta	
Ok-Oksapmin	Proto-Ok-Oksapmin		*mVjaan	*kVŋ; *saamVVn	*aleem; *ilnem			*ataan	*kajoop				
Greater Awyu	Proto-Awyu-Dumut	*gut	*angay; *ɑgɑi; *set	*wi	*yet	*wɑidin	*yin	*seyɑt	*wɑkot	*ox	*yin	*irop	
Kayagaric	Proto-Gondu River	*num	*epe	*wakum	*suopam	*map-jaxam	*wom	*taːm	*xa[x/ɣ]atam	*o[x/ɣ]om	*atu	*maitn	*kamein
Kolopom	Proto-Kolopom	*nemeŋg	*n[ia]	*k[o/u][a]		*uak	*nd[ua]t		*kumbanV	*ndzu		*mete	
Anim	Proto-Fly River	*n[u]m[u]ŋg		*mbasik		*kanV	*nde				*tae		
Anim	Proto-Inland Gulf	*uani	*gaso	*maɸa	*ewesa	*ɸutu; *usu	*de	*nowumu; *siwio	*bubei	*ogo	*maɸi; *ta[j]e		*jigei
Anim	Proto-Lower Fly River	*oɾ[eae]n	*s[eae]; *diɾean	*m[i/e]nawə	*dawod	*sVɣaɾə	*naukə	*manom	*manom	*mau[g/k]ə	*j[i]au	*didigə	*ewean
Anim	Proto-Marind	*nahun; *mba[m/mb]	*ŋgat	*basik	*ujub	*magaw	*de	*katane	*mandou	*adeka	*tekaw	*ketaɾ; *seŋga	*isas
Marori	Morori	nemeŋk	koro	bosik	ujif	vi	kwi	kum		deke	sir	mere	
Gogodala-Suki	Gogodala	ami	soke	uai				kadɛpa		wi	ila		nabidi
Kiwaian	Proto-Kiwai	*nimo	*[k]umu		*wowogo	*kikopu	*nuk₂a; *kota	*saɾik₂i; *si[w]io	*sagomi; *owe	*kobo	*keɾa	*(nok₂oɾa-)kopi	*gabo
Paniai Lakes	Ekari (Paniai Lake dialect)	uka	dodi	ekina	bedo	nipo	pija	meuka; tani	agoo	uwo	bodija	mogo	itá
Dani	Dani, Lower Grand Valley (Tangma dialect)	napɩ	jekke	wam	sʋe	sʋe-kken	e	mo	tuki	i	ettu	helep	kwe
Somahai	Momuna	amega	kwoka	uwo		magisaga	kwo	ɨkɨ		iŋga	kukwa	kɨ	
Mek	Proto-Mek	*ami	*gam	*be̝sam	*mak, *mag	*do̝[k]	*gal	*k[ɛ]t[e̝]ŋ	*wal	*m[ɛ/a]g	*o̝ᵘg	*gɛⁱl; *gidig	*bi[t/s]ig
Awin-Pa	Proto-Kamula-Elevala	*awV	*ti	*m₂aⁱnæ	*te̝ja	*m[ɔ/o̝]k[ɔ/o̝]	*je̝	*gani				*ike̝	
East Strickland	Gobasi	om	sɔf	bɔi	sigɔ	wigɔ hɔlɔ	hɔmɔ̃n	õs	ogɔ	hõ	dɔbu	yo	
Duna-Bogaya	Duna	tete	yawi	isa	heka	hapa	lowa; lɔwa	hewa	eke	yu	lɔwa kiliana; lowa puru	kana; kuna	
Duna-Bogaya	Bogaya	fando; fiľʌ	ɔv̧ɔpi; yau	ʌpʌn	aka; pitʌkʌ	oondi; pitʌkʌ ɔ̃udi	dowa; tɔuʌ	owa; ɔwa	kaiyuu; kʌiu	paiyuku; pʌiuku	dowada; tɔun	haana; hʌnʌ	
Bosavi	Kaluli	fe; fẽ	gasa; kasʌ	kabɔ	ɔ̃bẽ; oloone; oobaa	ɔ̃bẽ uš; us	i	of; ɔf	ili	hɔ̃n; hoon	de; di	u	
Kutubu	Proto-Lake Kutubu		*g[e/ẽ/a]s[a/ã]	*mena	*hʲaka	*kapa	*ita		*he̝ge̝	*hẽ	*ita	*kana	*ig[i]a
Enga-Kewa-Huli	Enga (Sari dialect)	tilya	yana	mena	yaka	yaka tuku	ita	niki; nira	kana	indaki	ira	kan	kait
Wiru	Wiru	nomo; nomò	tue	kaì	ini; inì	mu̧	yomo; yomò	lou; loú	tokene	ue; uè	toe	kue; kué	
Chimbu-Wahgi	Kuman	numan	aʝg; agi; akɬ̥	bogla; bugɬa	kua	mugɬo; muɬo	endi	ande; andesuŋgua	ba	nigl; nikɬ̥	baugl; doŋga	kombuglo; kombugɬo	konbo; konumbo
Madang	Proto-Madang	*[n]iman			*kVbara	*munaka	*tari	*kamali	*kalam; *takun	*yag(V)	*k(a,e)dap	*namanu	
Finisterre	Mungkip	mi; mīŋ	sap	kare	jāŋ	qiliq	bɛm	maim; male	jaʁip	ime; imɛ	kuduk; kugup	qawade	tɛlɛ; tɛrɛpmēŋ
Huon	Selepet	imen	soso		nâi; nɔi		nak	dewutâ; dewutɔ	emesenŋe	to	kɔlɔp	kât; kɔt	giop
Kainantu-Goroka	Proto-Eastern Kainantu-Goroka	*nu-N	*iya-N	*poe-V			*yë-V			*no-N	*ida-V		*ä-N
Kainantu-Goroka	Proto-Eastern Kainantu	*numɐ	*w₂ɐⁱni	*p₂uᵄɾɐ	*inɑːmɐ; *uwini	*uɾu	*jɐtɐɾi	*j₂uᵄni	*[u]toːnɐ	*noːni	*iʔjɐ	*oːni	*ɑːni
Kainantu-Goroka	Proto-Northern Kainantu	*nuN	*ijɐN	*poːɾ	*nuN	*uɾ	*jɑːj	*ɑːʔ	*wi[ɾ]oːN	*noːN	*itɐ	*oː[ɾ/j]	*ɑːj
Angan	Simbari	ila	njɨlɨka		ntaqatɨ	pantapta	ika	kwɨnja; nilya	lampaaka	aalya; wanya	ntɨka	sɨla	
Turama-Kikori	Proto-Rumu-Omati	*gutɔm	*gas	*gɔ[u]n	*gaᵋ	*d[ɔ]um	*i	*ɛsɔa		*wẽ̝	*i		*dɛⁱ
Goilalan	Fuyug	hi	ho; oi	ovo	Nemba; nembe	hulombo	i'i	evuli	hama	ʒu	oki	zo	enamba; inambe
Goilalan	Tauade	dautʰ	kɔveřa	pɔřu	kide	mutuwu	eata	vatava	ɔne	ipi	e'na·m	evi'ti	bɔřiƀařa
Greater Binanderean	Proto-Binandere		*sinә	*pu		*munju	*i	*iji; *waeko	*inua		*awo	*g{o,e}mb{a,i}(ro)	*begata; *esa; *ndai
Koiarian	Proto-Koiarian	*ʔumu			*ugu[fa]	*uni	*idí				*vené	*muni	
Kwalean	Proto-Kwalean (Ross)	*(n)omo(ne)	*ɣuni	*aba	*teboare	*ma(va)		*mada	*bato	*vou; *wara	*ire	*hadi	
Kwalean	Proto-Humene-Uare (Usher)	*nɔmɔnɛ	*ɣo̝ni	*aba	*ne̝ni; *t[e̝]b[o̝]ɾ[e̝]	*maɣa		*maˈda	*batɔ	*wɔu	*iɾɛ	*hadi	*e̝bi
Manubaran	Proto-Manubaran (Ross)	*gue	*auna	*Dona	*erena	*une-ma	*yabo	*maida(ka)	*e(y)oʔa; *mohe- (?)	*koru	*ita		
Manubaran	Proto-Mount Brown (Usher)	*gu[w]e	*auna	*dona	*eɾena	*unema	*jabo	*me[i]daʔa	*ejoʔa	*koɾu	*ita	*waʔiga	*ida
Yareban	Proto-Musa River	*uʔa	*kua	*boɾo	*gasiɾa; *ada	*baka; *uɾimi	*ana	*eweaka	*maɾabe; *sakaɾa	*adua	*inaʔa	*oma; *gebiɾo	*daʔaba
Mailuan	Mailu (Ilai dialect)	tuma	dari	talae	manu	muruʔu	ana	nina	dovele	ʔaʔama	eu	gomana	laea
Dagan	Daga	kuisin	eao	tuan	nɛnip	bagua	oma	oam	siragam	kaum	om		

Miscellaneous
family	language	man	woman	name	eat	one	two
Trans-New Guinea	Proto-Trans-New Guinea	*abV; *ambi	*panV; *pan(V)	*ibi; *imbi; *wani	*na; *na-		*ta(l,t)(a,e)
West Bomberai	Proto-Mbaham–Iha	*nami-sar	*t[ɔ/u]mb[ɔ/u]r	*nⁱɛ	*nawa	*ɔkʷɔ[nɔ]	
Asmat-Kamoro	Proto-Asmat-Kamrau		*ɟawoɟa	*uwase	*n[a]-	*ɟawa[kV]	*kaboma
Ok-Oksapmin	Proto-Ok-Oksapmin			*win			
Greater Awyu	Proto-Awyu-Dumut		*ran; *rɑn	*füp; *pip	*ɑde; *en; *ɛn-		*rumo; *rumon
Kayagaric	Proto-Gondu River	*jo[k]	*enop	*na[k]	*xapti	*pa[x/ɣ]amo[x/k]	*tousiki
Kolopom	Proto-Kolopom	*ndz[ia]p	*jowa[k]	*n[e/a][k/ŋg]			*[j]enapa; *sVp
Anim	Proto-Fly River	*anem	*anum			*ija (?)	*meas[i]
Anim	Proto-Inland Gulf	*aneme	*anumu	*jiga		*jaigio	*measi
Anim	Proto-Lower Fly River	*anem(ə)	*anum(ə)	*gag	*tamu	*ɣoɾ[e]a[u][k]	*mis
Anim	Proto-Marind	*anem	*anum	*igij	*ɣawi[ɣ]	*ijako[d]; *ijakod	*inah
Marori	Morori	yexri		nex	kef	sekodu	yenadu
Gogodala-Suki	Gogodala	dala; dalagi	ato; susɛgi	gagi	na		
Kiwaian	Proto-Kiwai	*dubu	*oɾobo; *upi	*paini, *paina	*oɾuso (sg.), *iɾiso (pl.)	*nak[o/u]	*netoa
Paniai Lakes	Ekari (Paniai Lake dialect)	jame		eka	nai	ena; kate	wijá
Dani	Dani, Lower Grand Valley (Tangma dialect)	ap	he; hʋmɩ	ettake		oppakke-at	p:ie
Somahai	Momuna	mogo-mearu			nowa-		
Mek	Proto-Mek		*ge̝l	*si	*de̝-(b)	*[na]tɔn	*b[e̝/ɛ]te̝ne̝
Awin-Pa	Proto-Kamula-Elevala	*k[ɔ/o̝]b[a/ɔ]		*pi	*de̝-	*tV[n/d]o̝	
East Strickland	Gobasi	os	uliʌ	hũni	nɔwalaga	hele	bihinɔ̃n
Duna-Bogaya	Duna	anoa; anɔa	ima	yaka	nai-; neyana	du	yapa
Duna-Bogaya	Bogaya	ami; ʌmĩ	ĩmiʌ; imya	ʌmĩn; yaga	nã; nosii	mɔsʌ kɔmʌ; moso	efʌn; yeefa
Bosavi	Kaluli	kalu	ga; kesali; kesari	wi	maya	ãgel; angel	a̧dep; ãdip
Kutubu	Proto-Lake Kutubu				*ne-	*hʲaga	
Enga-Kewa-Huli	Enga (Sari dialect)	akali	eŋda	keŋge	neŋge	mendai	lapoma
Wiru	Wiru	ali	atoa; atòa	ibini; ibíni	nakò; one ne nako	odene	takuta; ta kutà
Chimbu-Wahgi	Kuman	yagl; yakɬ̥	ambu	kaŋgin; kangi-ne	neuŋgua	suařa	suo
Madang	Proto-Madang		*na-gali(k)	*ibi; *wañim	*(n,ñ)a	*kati(ŋ,g)a	*arigita
Finisterre	Mungkip	mɛ	tam	buŋām; wow	nʌna	kubugaŋ	lifɛt
Huon	Selepet	lok	apet; ibi	kut; kut-	ne; ni-	konok	yâhâp
Kainantu-Goroka	Proto-Eastern Kainantu-Goroka	*kwe-(t)-V		*-wi-Q		*boda	
Kainantu-Goroka	Proto-Eastern Kainantu	*wɐⁱ-iNti	*ɐnɑːjeː	*utu	*nɐ-	*moːʔjɑː	*tɑːɾɐ
Kainantu-Goroka	Proto-Northern Kainantu	*wɑːⁱNsɐ	*ɐnɑːsi	*wiʔ		*mɐnɑː	*tɑːN
Angan	Simbari	kwala	aampala	yavata	an̲aantapyɨ	pɨrɨ'mɨna	pɨvɨraalna
Turama-Kikori	Proto-Rumu-Omati				*e̝ne̝ne̝n		*t[aⁱ/aᵋ]
Goilalan	Fuyug	A'a; an	Amu; amuri	ifa	huni nene	fida	ʒuvalo
Goilalan	Tauade	baře	iva	ape'te	ɔmei nai	kɔne	kupal'iai
Greater Binanderean	Proto-Binandere	*embә	*bam{u,o}nә	*jajo; *jawә	*ind-; *mind-	*daba	
Koiarian	Proto-Koiarian		*maɣina	*ifí	*i-	*(i,o)gau	
Kwalean	Proto-Kwalean (Ross)	*vaʒe	*no'ɣone	*ni	*anE-	*teba	*aheu
Kwalean	Proto-Humene-Uare (Usher)	*wajɛ	*nɔgɔnɛ	*ni	*an-	*te̝bɔ	*ahɛu
Manubaran	Proto-Manubaran (Ross)	*amie		*roka	*iri-	*yokohi	*(ye)(ka)ma[nu]
Manubaran	Proto-Mount Brown (Usher)	*ami[j]e	*ɾema	*ɾoka	*iɾi-	*jokohi	*[ɾ/j]ema
Yareban	Proto-Musa River	*e[ʔe]me	*aweta	*ibi	*it-	*demu	
Mailuan	Mailu (Ilai dialect)	egi	avesa	omu	isiisi	ʔomu	ʔava
Dagan	Daga	apan	oaen	yaoa	naiwan	daiton	dɛrɛ

For other lexical comparison tables of Papuan languages, see also:

- West Papuan languages#Lexical comparison
- West Bomberai languages#Lexical comparison
- West Papuan Highlands languages#Lexical comparison
- Northwest Papuan languages#Lexical comparison
- Trans-Fly–Bulaka River languages#Lexical comparison
- Papuan Gulf languages#Lexical comparison
- Torricelli languages#Lexical comparison
- Sepik–Ramu languages#Lexical comparison
- East Papuan languages#Lexical comparison

== See also ==
- List of Proto-Trans-New Guinea reconstructions (Wiktionary)

Synchronic reflexes

- Madang languages#Evolution
  - Kalam language#Evolution
  - Apali language#Evolution
- Finisterre–Huon languages#Evolution
  - Kâte language#Evolution
  - Selepet language#Evolution
- Kainantu–Goroka languages#Evolution
- Engan languages#Evolution
- Chimbu–Wahgi languages#Evolution
  - Wahgi language#Evolution
- East Strickland languages#Evolution
- Greater Awyu languages#Evolution
  - Mandobo language#Evolution
- Asmat–Kamrau languages#Evolution
  - Asmat language#Evolution
- Ok languages#Evolution
  - Telefol language#Evolution
- Marind–Yaqai languages#Evolution
- Paniai Lakes languages#Evolution
- Dani languages#Evolution
- Mek languages#Evolution
- Wiru language#Evolution
- Duna–Pogaya languages#Evolution
- Kutubuan languages#Evolution
- Kiwaian languages#Evolution
  - Kiwai language#Evolution
- Tirio languages#Evolution
- Awin–Pa–Kamula languages#Evolution
- Kolopom languages#Evolution
- Morori language#Evolution
- Gogodala–Suki languages#Evolution
- Inland Gulf languages#Evolution
- Greater Binanderean languages#Evolution
  - Binandere language#Evolution
- Mailuan languages#Evolution
- Dagan languages#Evolution
- Goilalan languages#Evolution
- Koiarian languages#Evolution
- Kwalean languages#Evolution
- Yareban languages#Evolution
- Manubaran languages#Evolution
- Timor–Alor–Pantar languages#Evolution

== Bibliography ==
- Pawley, Andrew; Hammarström, Harald (2017). "The Trans New Guinea family". The Languages and Linguistics of the New Guinea Area. De Gruyter. pp. 21–196. doi:10.1515/9783110295252-002. hdl:20.500.12657/23887. ISBN 978-3-11-029525-2.
- Pawley, Andrew (1998). "The Trans New Guinea Phylum hypothesis: A reassessment". In Jelle Miedema; Cecilia Odé; Rien A.C. Dam (eds.). Perspectives on the Bird's Head of Irian Jaya, Indonesia. Amsterdam: Rodopi. pp. 655–90. ISBN 978-90-420-0644-7. OCLC 41025250.
- Pawley, Andrew (2005). "The chequered career of the Trans New Guinea hypothesis: recent research and its implications". In Andrew Pawley; Robert Attenborough; Robin Hide; Jack Golson (eds.). Papuan pasts: cultural, linguistic and biological histories of Papuan-speaking peoples. Canberra: Pacific Linguistics. pp. 67–107. ISBN 0-85883-562-2. OCLC 67292782.

Ross, Malcolm (2005). "Pronouns as a preliminary diagnostic for grouping Papuan languages". In Andrew Pawley; Robert Attenborough; Robin Hide; Jack Golson (eds.). Papuan pasts: cultural, linguistic and biological histories of Papuan-speaking peoples. Canberra: Pacific Linguistics. pp. 15–66. doi:10.15144/PL-572. ISBN 0858835622. OCLC 67292782.

- Wurm, Stephen A., ed. (1975). Papuan languages and the New Guinea linguistic scene: New Guinea area languages and language study 1. Canberra: Dept. of Linguistics, Research School of Pacific Studies, Australian National University. OCLC 37096514. Archived from the original on 2010-06-20.
