= Witu =

Witu may refer to

== Kenya ==
- Wituland or Witu Sultanate
- Witu, Kenya, capital of Wituland

== Papua New Guinea ==
- Vitu language (which is also spelled Witu)
- Wiru (disambiguation) (which is also called Witu):
  - Wiru people
  - Wiru language

== Poland ==
- Military Institute of Armament Technology (Polish: Wojskowy Instytut Techniczny Uzbrojenia)
