= Foi language =

Kutubuan language of Papua New Guinea

Foi
- Region: Papua New Guinea
- Native speakers: 6,000 (2015)
- Language family: Papuan Gulf ?: Kikorian; Kutubuan; East Kutubuan; Foi

Language codes
- ISO 639-3: foi
- Glottolog: foii1241

Foi, also known as Foe or Mubi River, is one of the two East Kutubuan languages of the Trans-New Guinea family spoken along Lake Kutubu and Mubi River, located in the Southern Highlands Province of Papua New Guinea. Dialects of Foi are Ifigi, Kafa, Kutubu, Mubi. A Swadesh list for the Foi language was documented by The Rosetta Project in 2010. The estimated number of Foi speakers as of 2015 is between 6,000 and 8,000.

== Grammar ==
=== Syntax ===
Foi is a subject–object–verb language, similar to most languages in Papua New Guinea.

Foe adopts the usage of focused objects as sentence-initial. In noun phrases, Foi follows the pattern of Noun + Quantifier and Adjective + Noun.

Adverbial phrases are marked postpositionally by clitics in Foi.

Foi also has a series of evidentials to mark the verbal aspect of seen, unseen, deduced, possibility, and mental deduction.

=== Morphology ===
The subject or focus transitive in a sentence is marked with -mo as shown in example (1) below.

no-mo agira nibi'ae
I-FOC sweet.potato eat.did
'I ate the sweet potato'

Where the focus is on the person who is eating the sweet potato.

Subject or Focus Transitive Marking
	Base Form	Marked for Subject or Focus Transitivity
1 sg.	na(no)	no-mo
2 sg.	naʔa	nomaʔa-mo
3 sg.	jo	jo-ø
1 pl. excl.	jia	jia-mo
1 pl. incl.	jija	jija-mo
2 pl.	haʔa	hemaʔa-mo
3 pl.	jaʔa	jaʔa-ø
1 dl. excl.	jage	jage-mo
1 dl. incl.	jaʔa	jaʔa-ø
2 dl.	hagaʔa	hagemaʔa-mo
3 dl.	hagera	hagera-mo

=== Lexical ===
Foi has separate words for today and yesterday, as well as two, three, four and five days prior and hence.

=== Pronouns ===
Singular, dual, and plural are distinguished in personal pronouns. In addition, Foe also marks clusivity for first-person pronouns.

Personal Pronouns of Foi
		singular	dual	plural
1st person	inclusive	na(no)	jaʔa	jija
1st person	exclusive	na(no)	jage	jia
2nd person		naʔa	hagaʔa	haʔa
3rd person		jo	hagera	jaʔa

It was not made clear if a reported minimal distinction in the first-person plural form between the inclusive jia and exclusive jija is real.

== Phonology ==
=== Vowels ===
Foi features 5 vowels.

=== Consonants ===
The 16 consonants including the glottal stop used in Foi are:

		Labial	Alveolar	Dorsal	Glottal
Nasal		m	n	ŋ	
Plosive	voiceless		t	k	ʔ
Plosive	voiced	b	d	ɡ	
Fricative	voiceless	f	s		h
Fricative	voiced	v			
Liquid		w	r	j	

- Allophonic variation of [t, d, r] is common.

/y/ was mentioned as a consonant by Franklin, suggesting that the research was phonetically noted in Americanist phonetic notation. The table above has been amended according to the standards of International Phonetic Alphabet.

== Body-part counting system ==
Foi adopts the body-part counting system. This feature can also be found in approximately 60 Trans-New Guinea Languages such as Fasu and Oksapmin.

Counting typically begins by touching (and usually bending) the fingers of one hand, moves up the arm to the shoulders and neck, and in some systems, to other parts of the upper body or the head. A central point serves as the half-way point. Once this is reached, the counter continues, touching and bending the corresponding points on the other side until the fingers are reached.

Body-part corresponding to number in Foi
Number	Gloss	Translation	Number	Gloss	Translation
1	'little finger'	mena-gi	20	'side of nose'	to
2	'ring finger'	ha-gi	21	'eye'	i
3	'middle finger'	i-gi	22	'cheekbone'	bobo
4	'index finger'	tugu-bu	23	'ear'	kia
5	'thumb'	kaba	24	'upper neck'	fufu
6	'palm'	tama	25	'lower neck'	heno-go
7	'wrist'	bona-gi	26	'collarbone area',	keno
8	forearm'	kwebo	27	'shoulder'	ki
9	'inside elbow'	karo-habo	28	'upper middle arm'	ame-ni
10	'upper middle arm'	ame-ni	29	'inside elbow'	karo-habo
11	'shoulder'	ki	30	forearm'	kwebo
12	'collarbone area',	keno	31	'wrist'	bona-gi
13	'lower neck'	heno-go	32	'palm'	tama
14	'upper neck'	fufu	33	'thumb'	kaba
15	'ear'	kia	34	'index finger'	tugu-bu
16	'cheekbone'	bobo	35	'middle finger'	i-gi
17	'eye'	i	36	'ring finger'	ha-gi
18	'side of nose'	to	37	'little finger'	mena-gi
19	'ridge of nose'	kisi			

== Language status ==
According to Ethnologue, the language status of Foi is '5*', referring to the situation whereby the language is anticipated to be in vigorous use by all, based on the informed guess made by editorial team due to the lack of information. This status is based on Lewis and Smino's (2010) Expanded Graded Intergenerational Disruption Scale (EGIDS).
