= Doso–Turumsa languages =

Languages of New Guinea

Doso–Turumsa
- Soari River
- Geographic distribution: Soari River, Western Province, Papua New Guinea
- Linguistic classification: Papuan Gulf ?: Strickland; Doso–Turumsa
- Subdivisions: Doso; Turumsa

Language codes
- Glottolog: doso1238

The Doso–Turumsa languages are a pair of closely related languages spoken along the Soari River of New Guinea, namely Doso and Turumsa, that appear to be closest to the East Strickland languages.

== Pronouns ==
The pronouns correspond very closely. They are:

	sg	pl
1	*aɾẽ	*aĩ
2	*nã	*nu
3	*õ	*ũ

== See also ==
- Dibiyaso language
