= Pawaia language =

Pawala language spoken in Papua New Guinea

Pawaia
- Region: Papua New Guinea
- Native speakers: (6,000 cited 2000)
- Language family: Papuan Gulf ?: Teberan–Pawaian; Pawaia
- Dialects: Aurama (Turoha, Uri); Hauruha

Language codes
- ISO 639-3: pwa
- Glottolog: pawa1255
- ELP: Pawaia
- Map: The Pawaia language of New Guinea The Pawaia language Trans–New Guinea languages Other Papuan languages Austronesian languages Uninhabited

Pawaia, also known as Sira, Tudahwe, Yasa, is a Papuan language that forms a tentative independent branch of the Trans–New Guinea family in the classification of Malcolm Ross (2005).

== Distribution ==
Pawaia is spoken in:

- Chimbu Province: Karimui District
- Eastern Highlands Province: Lufa District and Okapa District, Lamari River
- Gulf Province: Baimuru Rural LLG, Purari River near Oroi

== Classification ==
Although Pawaia has reflexes of Proto-Trans–New Guinea vocabulary, Ross considers its inclusion questionable on available evidence. Usher classifies it instead with the Teberan languages. Noting insufficient evidence, Pawley and Hammarström (2018) leave it as unclassified rather than as part of Trans-New Guinea.

Pawley and Hammarström (2018) do not consider there to be sufficient evidence for Pawaia to be classified as part of Trans-New Guinea, though they do note the following lexical resemblances between Pawaia and Proto-Trans–New Guinea.

- emi 'breast' < *amu
- in 'tree' < *inda
- su 'tooth' < *(s,t)i(s,t)i

== Phonology ==
Consonants
	Labial	Alveolar	Dorsal
Plosive	p	t	k
Fricative		s	h
Nasal	m	n	
Approximant	w	l	j

Vowels
	Front	Central	Back
High	i ĩ		u ũ
Mid	e ẽ		o õ
Low		a ã	ɔ ɔ̃

Pawaia is also tonal, contrasting high and low tone.

== Vocabulary ==
The following basic vocabulary words are from Macdonald (1973) and Trefry (1969), as cited in the Trans-New Guinea database:

gloss	Pawaia
head	mu
hair	muse; sị
ear	nȩᶦ; nɛ̣i
eye	to; toᵘ
nose	ho; họ
tooth	su
tongue	ha̧pi; hɛmina
leg	hɛ; si̧ʔi̧
louse	po; poř
dog	hạ; hɛ̧
pig	ya
bird	deř; ge
egg	ge džu; yo
blood	sɛni; su̧
bone	džɛmɛ; yɛmi
skin	hɛʔȩ; hɛi
breast	ɛmi
tree	i̧; in
man	džʌʔla; yala
woman	oi; u
sun	ol; olsuɛ; sia
moon	we; wɛ
water	sa
fire	sia
stone	tobu; topu
road, path	sụ
name	hɛʔɛpi; hopi
eat	hatisụɛ; ti haʔayɛ
one	pɛʔɛmi; pomi
two	naʔau; nau
