= Simbu =

Simbu can refer to

- Silambarasan Rajendar, Tamil actor
- Chimbu Province, alternative spelling of the province of Papua New Guinea
- Kuman language (New Guinea), also known as Chimbu or Simbu
- Chimbu River, river in Papua New Guinea

== People with the surname ==
- Alphonce Simbu, Tanzanian runner
