= Teberan–Pawaian languages =

Teberan–Pawaian
- Tua River
- Geographic distribution: Tua River, Papua New Guinea
- Linguistic classification: Papuan Gulf?: Teberan–Pawaian
- Subdivisions: Teberan; Wiru; Pawaia

Language codes
- Glottolog: None

The Teberan–Pawaian languages, or Tua River languages, are a family of Papuan languages, established by Timothy Usher, that are spoken in the region of the Tua River. They are the Teberan languages and the Wiru and Pawaia isolates. Teberan and Pawaian had previously been linked, along with the East Kutubuan languages, in Wurm's 1975 Trans-Murray branch of Trans–New Guinea.
