= Folopa language =

Teberan language spoken in Papua New Guinea

Folopa
- Native to: Papua New Guinea
- Region: Gulf Province: Baimuru District and Kerabi Valley; Southern Highlands Province. 20 villages.
- Native speakers: (3,000 cited 1985)
- Language family: Papuan Gulf ?: Tua River; Teberan; Folopa
- Writing system: Latin

Language codes
- ISO 639-3: ppo
- Glottolog: folo1238

Folopa (also Podopa, Polopa, Podoba, or Foraba) is a language of Papua New Guinea.
