= Omati language =

Papuan language spoken in Papua New Guinea

Omati
- Region: Papua New Guinea
- Native speakers: 770 (2011)
- Language family: Papuan Gulf ?: Kikorian; Turama–Kikorian; Turama; Omati

Language codes
- ISO 639-3: Either: jbk – Barikewa jmw – Mouwase
- Glottolog: bari1298 Barikewa mouw1234 Mouwase

Omati, or Mini, is a Papuan language spoken in the Omati River area of Papua New Guinea. The two varieties, Barikewa and Mouwase, are quite divergent.
