= Doso =

Doso may refer to:

- An alias of Demeter in Greek mythology
- Doso (Buddhism), a lower-ranking "hall monk" in the Japanese Tendai school of Buddhism
- Doso language, an unclassified language spoken in Papua New Guinea
