= DUMU =

Dumu or DUMU may refer to:

- Dumu or Domo, a name for a variety of the Vanimo language, a type of Skou language from Papua New Guinea
- Dumu language, a Papuan language of Papua New Guinea, also known as Tumu, Rumu, Kairiand, and Kibiri
- DUMU, the acronym for the Clerical Board of Ukraine's Muslims, from the organization's Ukrainian name
- DUMU (son Sumerogram), a Sumerian cuneiform logogram, signifying words including son, young, small, or junior
