= Tomu language =

Tomu may be either of two Papuan languages:

- a variety of the Arandai language
- an alternative name for the Odoodee language
