= Duna language =

Language spoken in Papua New Guinea

Duna
- Native to: Papua New Guinea
- Region: Southern Highlands - Hela Province: Koroba-Kopiago District, east from the Strickland River; Enga Province: Paiela-Hewa Rural LLG
- Ethnicity: Duna
- Native speakers: 25,000 (2002)
- Language family: Trans–New Guinea?: Duna–Pogaya?; Duna

Language codes
- ISO 639-3: duc
- Glottolog: duna1248
- Map: The Duna–Pogaya languages of New Guinea The Duna–Pogaya languages Other Trans–New Guinea languages Other Papuan languages Austronesian languages Uninhabited

Duna (also known as Yuna) is a Papuan language of Papua New Guinea. It may belong to the Trans New Guinea language family and is often further classified as a Duna-Pogaya language, for Bogaya appears to be Duna's closest relative, as evidenced by the similar development of the personal pronouns. Estimates for number of speakers range from 11,000 (1991) to 25,000 (2002). (Note: Unless otherwise noted, all information is taken from: San Roque (2008))

== Language context ==
=== Duna people ===
Duna is the native language of the polysemically named Duna people, who live in the north-western area of the Southern Highlands Province. The area lies in a mountainous terrain with altitudes ranging from 900 to 13000 feet. With an even distribution of rainfall (4500mm annually) and temperatures (65 to 83 °F), the environment qualifies for farming and some tree cultivation. This is why most Duna are substance farmers with sweet potatoes being the staple food, alongside other gardened fruit and vegetables. Furthermore, they keep domesticated pigs and trap fish in Lake Kopiago while also hunting smaller game such as possums, bats and little birds. In addition, the diet includes gathered mushrooms, ferns and cresses.

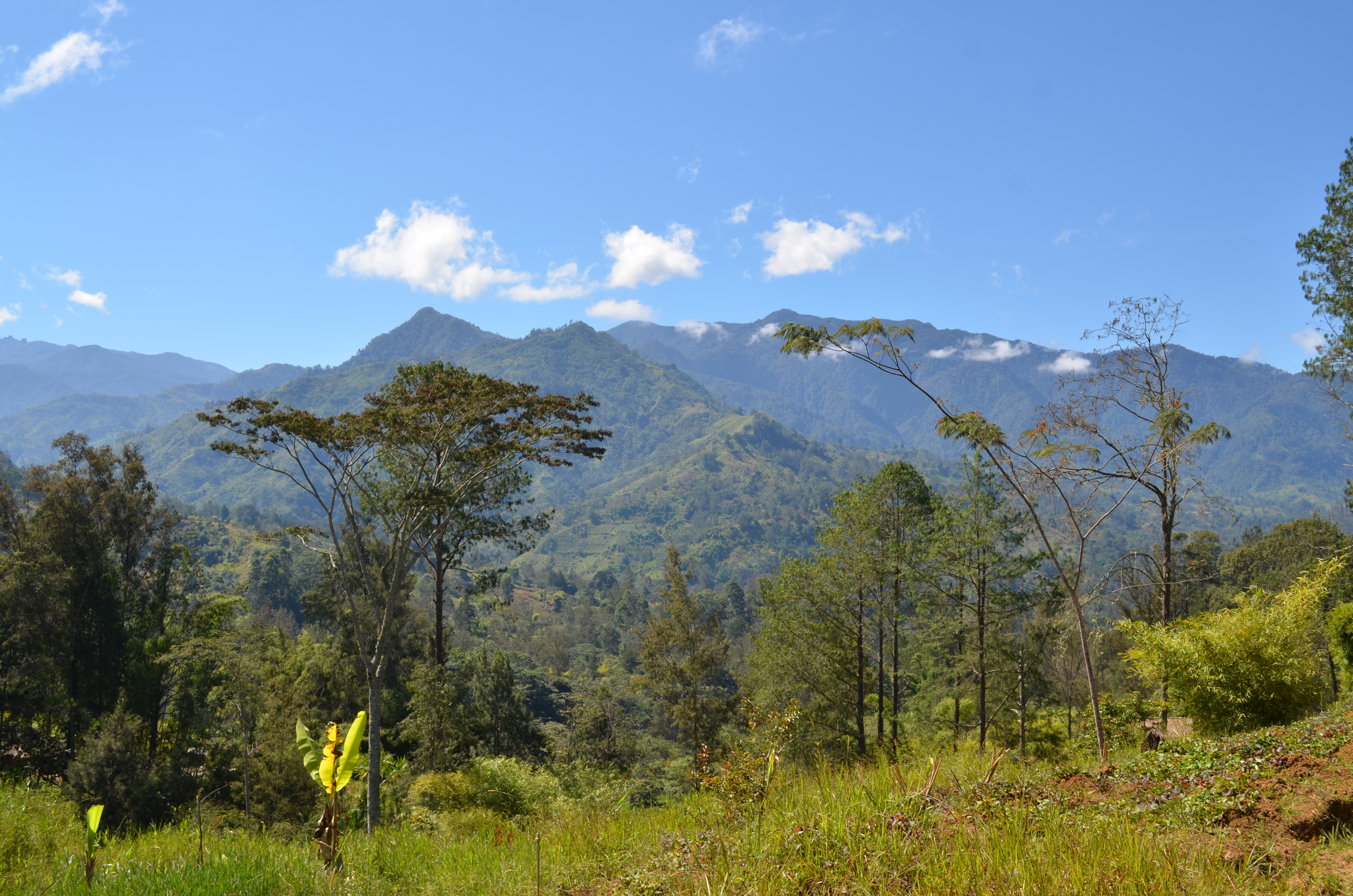
Papua New Guinea Highlands

The Duna are grouped in clans and parishes. Each member shares extensive responsibilities, requiring a substantial social effort for the group. Before the first direct contact with Europeans in the 1930s, their culture maintained a strict separation of males and females. Early on, boys were separately raised and trained into manhood. Other significant themes of pre-contact life included ordered warfare, courting and the potency of ritual sacrifice. Since the establishment of a government station in the 1950s by Australia, the customs and traditions have undergone some significant changes, for instance community schooling etc.

There is only little paid work available in the area and electricity or telecommunication networks are not regularly accessible. The region does have a large health centre near Kopiago and a community school up to 8th grade. The Highland Highway is part of the overland transport network, but it is intermittent and in poor condition, so that most traveling is done on foot. Flights go fairly regularly on a weekly or twice-weekly basis to Kopiago (Note: The airport is operated by the Mission Aviation Fellowship out of Mount Hagen in Western Highlands Province).

=== Language influences ===
Ex. Duna loanwords
Duna	Tok Pisin	English
pʰɛkɛtɛɾi	fekteri	"factory"
t̪ʰukuɺi	skul	"school"
kɔⁿdaɾɛkɛ	kontrek	"contract"
ᵐbuku/a	buk	"book"

The relatively late contact with Europeans means that the impact on the Duna language from English has only been recent. As the cultural changes brought about several new concepts, the lexical vocabulary was enlarged by a variety of loanwords, though it is unclear whether these came from English or the English-related creole language Tok Pisin. The influence of English is increasing, though, as English has been implemented in the school curricula. Teachers have to gradually introduce it up to the 3rd grade and from then on it is supposed to be the main language in teaching (Note: Reports from teachers suggest that English, Tok Pisin as well as Duna are all being used throughout the education.).

Tok Pisin is the official language in the northern mainland region and consequently used by the Duna to communicate with the outside. The ability to speak Tok Pisin varies, with some only being able to passively understand Tok Pisin and others, mainly people having spent time outside of the Duna community, being fluent. The general status of Tok Pisin led to first variations, meaning Tok Pisin-derived words can be used next to Duna equivalents, f.e. people say siriki, meaning "to trick", instead of the Duna verb adjunct ho with the same meaning.

The close contact with the Huli people has had the most influence on the Duna language to the extent that Duna speakers make a clear distinction between the Duna spoken in the north-western region and the one spoken in the south-eastern region, which is closest to the Huli area. The influence can be observed in phonetic and lexical variation. For example, many of the synonym sets of Duna have one variant that is likely derived from Huli words, seen by the similarity to its Huli counterpart: yu and ipa both mean "water, liquid" where /ipa/ is also a Huli word.

== Phonology ==
In Duna phonology, the syllable structure is generally (C)V(V), which means that the coda is always empty. Occupation of the onset is optional, though consonant clusters are not allowed. This is why loanwords that originated from words with consonant clusters as in factory have adjusted to the Duna syllable structure by inserting vowels between consonants.

=== Consonants ===
Duna's consonant system consists of twenty consonant phonemes with some allophonic variation. Stop phonemes are distinguished by aspiration and voicing / prenasalisation in three places of articulation. Only the glottal fricatives appear as distinct phonemes, but the aspirated stops can be realized as allophonic affricates or fricatives word-initially, f.e. in /pʰu/ "blow" which occurs as voiceless stop [pʰu], affricate [pɸu] or fricative [ɸu]. The glottal fricative only appears at the beginning of roots and alternates between a voiceless [h] and a murmured [ɦ] realisation: see /hɔ/ "here it is" with [hɔ] or [ɦɔ]. Allophonic variation also occurs with word-initial prenasalised stops in bilabial or velar place of articulation when preceding the vowel /a/, where the stop can be dropped: [ᵐbapu] vs. [mapu] "(en)circle". Word-initially, the tap has four allophonic realisations: [ɾ], [t], [d], [dɾ], as in /ɾiⁿdi/ "land", while emphatic speech can also lead to a realisation of a trill [r] word-initially or medially. Glides usually do not vary allophonically.

		Bilabial	Apical	Palatal	Velar		Glottal	
Stop	plain	p	t̪		k	kʷ		
Stop	aspirated	pʰ	t̪ʰ		kʰ	kʰʷ		
Stop	prenasalised	ᵐb	ⁿd		ᵑɡ	ᵑɡʷ		
Nasal		m	n					
Liquid	tap		ɾ					
Liquid	lateral flap		ɺ					
Fricative							h	hʷ
Glide		w		j				

=== Vowels ===
There are five phonemically distinct vowels. Following a back vowel, unrounded vowels in final syllables with a palatal glide in the coda are often reduced to an [ɘ] or [ɨ]. Vocalic nasalisation often occurs for sound related words, as in rũ- "whine", and in context of nasal consonants; however, nasalisation seems to be optional in most cases.

	Front	Central	Back
High	i		u
Mid	ɛ		ɔ
Low		a	

In VV sequences, the second V can be a distinct vowel or a glide: /ai/ "who" with [ai] or [aj]. The first V often undergoes assimilation, being reduced to [ɘ] as in the morpheme /-nɔi/ with [-nɘj]. High vowels only occur as the first V when the second V is a low vowel. In word-medial position following a high vowel and preceding a low vowel, the apical nasal and the apical stop will be palatalized as in /it̪a/ "pig" with [it̪a] or [it̪ʲa]; a few other consonants do so, too, but less frequently in this environment. In between rounded vowels and the low vowel, velar stops can also be labialised, seen in /ɾɔka/ "many" with [ɾɔka] or [ɾɔkʷa]. The phonemic status of these labialized velar stops is debatable, but find evidence in CGV syllable structures (G for glide) that could have emerged from underlying labialized phonemes as discussed by San Roque (2008:51).

=== Pitch contrast ===
Ex. monosyllable pitch contrasts
Fall	Rise	Convex	Level
tʰɛ "shore"	–	tʰɛ "origin"	tʰɛ "be leisurely"
kãɔ "spell"	kãɔ "lie"	–	–

Duna uses four contrastive pitch contours on lexical roots to discern lexical items. Thereby, “the word as a whole is more important than the syllable as a domain for the assignment of tones”. A downward movement of the pitch is characteristic for the fall contour and an upward movement for the rise contour. The convex contour shows both upward and downward movement while the level contour shows no change in pitch. Depending on the number of syllables, the pitch will be extended or contracted, meaning for disyllabic words that the convex contour rises on the first syllable and falls on the second. Not all contours are contrastive with respect to each other in every environment. For monosyllabic words, the convex and rise contours do not lead to lexical distinctions whereas the convex and fall contours do not show contrasts for polysyllabic words. Contrasts therefore exist at most between three contours.

== Word classes ==
=== Pronouns ===
There are pronouns for singular and plural as well as dual. The dual seems to be derived from the singular form, adding a prefix, although the third person corresponds to the first person dual form. Duna has syncretism in the first and second person plural. The third person is special in that it is often cliticized to nominal phrases in subject position or possessive constructions. An exclusive identity marker -nga can be added to subject pronouns, signaling that the subject is doing an action by itself or doing a reflexive activity. This exclusivity feature can also be achieved by doubling the pronouns.

Personal pronouns
	Singular	Dual	Plural
1	no	keno	inu
2	ko	nako	inu
3	kho	kheno	khunu

Notice the special forms for contrastive subjects of singular and plural pronouns, which again indicate a close relationship between singular and dual pronouns. These forms differ from the normal pronouns in the vowel, having an a instead of an o. The suffix -ka is the compositional contrastive subject marker used on nouns. Contrastive subjects either designate a kind of focus, thus distinguishing a new or unexpected subject from other clause referents, or has a similar effect as ergative case marking by making the subject stand out from other participants.

Contrastive subject pronouns
	Singular	Dual
1	na	kena(-ka)
2	ka	naka
3	kha	khena(-ka)

=== Nouns ===
Plurality of nouns can be signaled through repetition of the noun, but this is not obligatory. A clause can contain unmarked, indefinite, generic noun phrases containing only a single lexical constituent:

wi kiti-rane
game.animal descend-SW.SEQ
"Game animals came down"

Using the suffix -ne, adjectives can be nominalised (Note: Instead of making an ordinal noun, the combination of -ndu "one" and the nominaliser forms a noun roughly with the meaning of "thing".). Nominals can also be derived from verbs with the nominaliser -ne, but they then need the habitual verbal inflection -na. This composition resembles the meaning of "for the purpose of".

Adjectival nominalisation:	Verbal nominalisation:
kete-ne ramene-na small-TYPE group-SPEC "the group of little bits"	ka na-na-ne peli ndu sa-ta si heya neya 2SG.CS eat-HAB-TYPE good one get-SEQ hold come.IPFV NOT "You have not brought a good thing for eating [i.e., food]."

Possessive relations are established by juxtaposition of nominal phrases or by a phrase containing the postposition -ya "benefactory (BEN)", in particular when the possessor is animate and the possessee alienable and inanimate. The possessee hereby follows the possessor.

Noun phrase possessive:	Postpositional possessive:
no ame hutia 1SG father come.PFV.VIS.P "My father came."	no-ya ndune ndu 1SG-BEN thing one "something of mine"

=== Verbs ===
One can make out three verb classes: "consonantal verbs" are composed of a consonant and the vowel /a/ in the a-base form, typically those are verbs of motion, existentiality and dynamic activities; the "wa-class" verbs generally include the morpheme wa or ua in the a-base form. Contrary to regular verbs, members of both classes undergo vowel changes for various processes such as inflection and are able to take verb adjuncts. Regular roots invariably end in the same vowel to which inflectional affixes attach. Consonantal and wa-class verbs use three base forms for various roles, f.e. both classes take the a-base form for the imperative.

The basic morphological structure of a verb is as follows:

NEG –	Verb root –	Modifiers –	NEG –	Inflectional morphology

Negation is expressed by the circumfix na- -ya, which encloses the verb root (in verb serialisation enclosing all verb roots).

==== Verb Modifiers ====
Adding derivational suffixes or directional demonstratives to the verbal root alters the verbal meaning. Directional demonstratives such as sopa "below" or roma "above" contribute a direction to the portrayed verbal action. Modifiers similar to adverbials add such aspects as exhaustivity (-ku "completeness"), actions involving a circle (-yare "encircling"), reiterativity (-ria "again") or actions towards the speaker (-ku "towards"). Modifiers signaling verbal participants not yet part of the subcategorization of the verb include the causative -ware, which adds a new agent that has permission to do or causes the action, and the benefactive -iwa, signaling a new benefactor for whom the action is played out.

Directional demonstrative:	Adverbial-like modifiers:	Participant modifiers:
phoko-sopa-na jump-below-SPEC "(He) is jumping down."	nei-ku-wei eat-EXHAUST-PROHIB "Don't eat [them all]."	no antia-ya khira-iwa-nda 1SG mother-BEN cook-BNF-INT "I will cook for my mother."

==== Verb adjuncts ====
The irregular verbs can combine with verb adjuncts, which precede the verb root and seem to form a new root as the negation encloses both adjunct and the verb root. The combination of verb root and adjunct is not free, so that often an adjunct only goes with one verb. The verb nga "go" can, for instance, occur with the adjunct aru "be responsible for" to generate the meaning "travel with, escort" and when combined with the adjunct iri "fetch", it denotes "fetch to take away". These constructions might be the result of previous verb serialisations.

==== Inflectional morphology ====
TAM markers	Regular form
Perfective	-o ~ -u
Imperfective	-
Intentive	-nda
Desiderative	-no
Stative	-i
Habitual	-na
Prophetic	-na
Promissive	-wei
Abilitative	-nopo
Imperative	-pa
Prohibitive	-wei
Hortative	-wae
Warning	-wayeni
Suggestion	HORT/INT+kone

Duna's inflectional system includes obligatory and optional morphemes that appear to the very end of a verb's morphological structure. Duna's TAM markers are all obligatory inflections. In addition, some evidential and informational status morphemes encode TAM features in addition to their individual meanings, thus occurring instead of the TAM markers, making them part of the obligatory category. The second kind of evidential and informational status marker is optional and has scope over inflected verbs, requiring prior affixation of TAM markers. They extend the proposition by adding a perspective of how it is being evaluated. Epistemic state markers are always optional and invariably follow obligatory inflections – they provide details about personal opinions.

There are 14 mutually exclusive TAM markers in Duna, specifying temporal relations, including tense and aspect, and event modality, which expresses the view on the actualisation of the event, including matters of ability, intention or obligation and permission. The evidential markers classify the kind of evidence for the event, whether its proposition is justified on a visual, non-visual sensory, resultative or notional basis. The appropriate morpheme is chosen based on its relationship to the TAM features. With information status markers, the information under question is evaluated as being from an individual or shared standpoint, specific, uncertain, dramatic, expective or a potential observation. The epistemic state markers include the particles =pi, which signals personal knowledge, opinion or judgement, =koae/=nokoae, expressing uncertainty about the outcome of a hypothetical event, and =pakapi for probable propositions.

== Clause structure ==
=== Basic clause structure ===
The basic clause structure is SOV. In ditransitive clauses, the object denoting the theme follows the recipient.

hina-ko no {ki nguani} ngua-na=nia.
this-CS 1SG {k.pig fat} give-HAB=ASSERT
Subject Recipient Theme V
"This one would give me pig fat."

For adjuncts, there are two positions in the linearisation. Following the proposal to split adjuncts into those that in some way participate in the event and those that do not, but rather describe the setting or the circumstances, the latter, circumstantial constituents would fill the spot between subject and object while the former, participatory elements follow the object. In structures with intransitive verbs, adjuncts are located after the subject. Markers specify the role of the adjuncts, as for instance the instrumental marker -ka, which inherently indicates a participatory element, or the locational marker -ta, which can be participatory or circumstantial, depending on whether semantically the constituent is part of the verbal action or complementary information.

Participatory + instrumental:

na	uru	ndu	pandu-ka	so-ra.
1SG.CS	rat	one	trap-INSTR	strike-SHRD
Subject	Object		Participatory	V
"I killed a rat with a trap."

Participatory + locational:

Story	paluni	mbatia	inu-ta	ruwa	ngu.
talk	legacy	some	1/2PL-LOC	say	give.PFV
Object			Participatory	V
"[She] gave some final advice to us"

Circumstantial + locational:

Haya	keno	mbou-ta	hina	anda-ya
PSN	1DL	garden-LOC	sw.potato	dig.up-DEP
Subject		Circumstantial	Object	V
"Haya and I dug up sweet potatoes at the garden."

=== Non-verbal clauses ===
When declaring identity of two elements, Duna has no need of a copula. Two noun phrases can simply be juxtaposed to indicate identity or a similarity relation. The same goes for adjectival predicates: juxtaposing subject and adjective results in property attribution.

no hinid Paka.
1SG ground PLN
"My homeland is Paka."

Yuna haka paya.
GPN talk good
"Duna language is good"

=== Interrogative clauses ===
To form a question in Duna, one can use one of three ways. Interrogative words are positioned in canonical position (same place as the answer will go). The interrogative marker -pe attaching to the verb is optional with interrogative words, but necessary for simple yes–no questions. A third possibility are tag questions, for which the speaker combines the interrogative marker and repeats the verb with the negative marker na- -ya.

=== Serialisation ===
To describe cohesive events, verbal roots are adjoined. Only the last root receives inflectional morphology, which is then shared by all verbal roots. The negation circumfix hereby encloses the whole verb root serialisation. Often, the verbs will have at least one shared argument.

Pambo pi kola kuwa-rua.
cucumber LNK pick carry-STAT.VIS.P
"[They] plucked and carried cucumbers.
