= JKO =

JKO may refer to:

- J. K. Organisation, Indian conglomerate
- Jacqueline Kennedy Onassis (1929–1994), First Lady of the United States
- Jacqueline Kennedy Onassis Reservoir in Central Park, New York City
- Junkers, a former German aircraft manufacturer
- Kubo language, a Trans–New Guinea language of New Guinea, spoken in the plains of the Strickland River.
