= Ikobi language =

Papuan Gulf language of Papua New Guinea

Ikobi
- Mena
- Region: Papua New Guinea
- Native speakers: 1,600 (2009)
- Language family: Papuan Gulf ?: Kikorian; Turama–Kikorian; Turama; Ikobi

Language codes
- ISO 639-3: meb
- Glottolog: ikob1240

Ikobi, or Ikobi-Mena after its two varieties, is a Papuan language, or pair of languages, of Papua New Guinea. Wurm and Hattori (1981) treat the two varieties, Ikobi and Mena, as distinct languages, but Ethnologue 16 judges them to be one.
