= Turumsa language =

Papuan language of Papua New Guinea

Turumsa
- Region: Papua New Guinea
- Native speakers: 5 (2002); Possibly extinct (2011)
- Language family: Papuan Gulf ?: Strickland; Doso–Turumsa; Turumsa

Language codes
- ISO 639-3: tqm
- Glottolog: turu1250
- ELP: Turumsa

Turumsa is a possibly extinct Papuan language of Makapa village (7.937872°S 142.576135°E) in Gogodala Rural LLG, Middle Fly District, Papua New Guinea. It has been classified as a Bosavi language, and is 19% lexically similar with Dibiyaso, but this appears to be due to loans. It has a greater (61%) lexical similarity with Doso, its only clear relative.

There were only five elderly speakers found in 2002. Today, most people in Makapa village speak Dibiyaso.
