= FIW =

FIW may refer to:

- Fiwaga language
- The Future Is Wild, a British documentary miniseries
- Wiesloch Feldbahn and Industrial Museum (German: Feldbahn- und Industriemuseum Wiesloch),
- Family interference with work; see Work–family conflict
- Feature Interaction Workshops; see Feature interaction problem § Workshops and conferences
- Friendship Is Witchcraft, an online webseries parodying My Little Pony: Friendship Is Magic.
