= Wiru =

Wiru or Witu may refer to:

- Wiru people
- Wiru language
- Wiru Rural LLG, Papua New Guinea
