= Body-part counting system =

Mathematical concept

Some languages of the world have numeral systems that do not make use of an arithmetic base. One such system is the body-part counting system which make use of further body parts to extend the system beyond the ten fingers.

Counting typically begins by touching (and usually bending) the fingers of one hand, moves up the arm to the shoulders and neck, and in some systems, to other parts of the upper body or the head. A central point serves as the half-way point. Once this is reached, the counter continues, touching and bending the corresponding points on the other side until the fingers are reached.

== Use ==
The body-part counting system is quite typical of a number of languages within the New Guinea Highlands.

=== Oceania ===
- Foi, an East Kutubuan language, features a body-part numeral system that counts up to 37.
- Oksapmin, a Trans–New Guinea language spoken in Sandaun Province, features a body-part counting system that goes up to 27. Geoffrey Saxe, in ethnographic work, has described shifts in form and function of the system in recent history linked to shifts towards a cash economy and the introduction of Western-styled schooling.
- Kobon, a Papuan language spoken in the Madang Province, counts up to 23. The count can then be reversed for larger numbers.

== Reverse counting ==
For example, in Kobon, the body parts on the left-hand side of the body are used in order to count from 1 to 12. The count can then continue down the right-hand side of the body up to 23. It is then possible to reverse the count, starting from the end point on the right as 24 back up to the 12th position on the left as 35, then down again to the end point on the left as 46.

One effect of this is that the names of particular body parts when used as numerals are multiply ambiguous. The same body part can represent multiple numbers depending on the how many passes across the body were made. There are usually means, optional or obligatory depending on the language, to distinguish the second side of the body used in a count from the first, as well as to indicate which pass across the body is being used, but there is no productive means to identify other than a small number of passes across the body.
