= Selepet language =

Papuan language of Papua New Guinea

Selepet
- Native to: Papua New Guinea
- Region: Huon Peninsula, Morobe Province
- Native speakers: (7,200 cited 2000 census)
- Language family: Trans–New Guinea: Finisterre–Huon; Huon; Western Huon; Selepet

Language codes
- ISO 639-3: spl
- Glottolog: sele1250

Selepet (or Selepe) is a Papuan language spoken in Selepet Rural LLG, Morobe Province, Papua New Guinea.

== Evolution ==
Below are some reflexes of proto-Trans-New Guinea proposed by Pawley (2012):

proto-Trans-New Guinea	Selepet
*masi ‘orphan’	madu
*me(n,t)e ‘head’	mete ‘forehead’
*mV(k,ŋ)V[C] + t(e,i)- ‘vomit’	mohat (cf. Nomu mekat ‘spittle’, Timbe mugat ‘be sick’)
*mVn[a]-‘be, live, stay’	man- ‘live, dwell’
*mo ‘penis’	mɔi
*(m,mb)elak ‘light, lightning’	belek
*kumV- ‘die’	(cf. Burum kɔmu-)
*iman ‘louse’	imen
*(s,nd)umu(n,t)[V] ‘hair’	somot
*amu ‘breast’	(n)am ‘breast, milk’
*am(a,i) ‘mother’	(?) (m)ɔmɔ
*na- ‘eat’	ne-
*nVŋg- ‘know, hear, see’	nɔgɔ- ‘hear, know, listen to s.t.’
*ni ‘1PL free pronoun’	ne(n) ‘1PL’, ne(t) ‘1DL’
*n[e]i ‘bird’	nɔi
*kan(a,e)ne ‘left (side)’	kane
*mVn[a]-‘be, live, stay’	man- ‘live, dwell’
*mbena ‘arm’	bɔt
*kani ‘foot’	kɔi
*iman ‘louse’	imen
*-Vn ‘1SGsubj agrmt’	-an ‘1SG, 1PL’
*ŋaŋ[a] ‘baby’	ŋaŋa
*mbalaŋ ‘flame’	balam
*mbilaŋ ‘tongue’	ni-bilam
*sa(ŋg,k)asiŋ ‘sand’	sak
*mbalaŋ ‘flame’	balam
*mbilaŋ ‘tongue’	[ni]bilim
*mbena ‘arm’	(?) bot
*mbulikV ‘turn (oneself)’	purik (sɔ-)
*imbi ‘name’	ibi
*sambV ‘cloud’	hibim ‘sky’
*ambi ‘man’	(?) ibi ‘woman’
*simb(i,u) ‘guts’	tep- ‘stomach, intestines’
*si(mb,p)at[V] ‘saliva’	(Sialum sawat, Migabac sofoʔ, Nomu sowot)
*kutV(mb,p)(a,u)[C] ‘long’	kɔlip
*kambu ‘ashes’	kɔu
*kend(o,u)p ‘fire’	kɔlɔp
*nde- ‘speak’	sɔmedial
*kend(o,u)p ‘fire’	kɔlɔp
*ka(nd,t)(e,i)kV ‘ear’	(?) ɔndɔp (prob. a loanword. Suter (p.c.) reconstructs pHuon Peninsula *kazap ‘ear’)
*tVk- ‘cut, cut off’	tok [yap] ‘snap, break’
*kutV(mb,p)(a,u)[C] ‘long’	kɔlip
*kVtak ‘new’	irak
*(s,nd)umu(n,t)[V] ‘hair’	somot
*sa(ŋg,k)asin ‘sand’	sak
*(s,nd)umu(n,t)[V] ‘hair’	somot
*si(mb,p)at[V] ‘saliva’	(Sialum sawat, Migabac sofoʔ, Nomu sowot)
*simb(i,u) ‘guts’	(?) tep- ‘stomach, intestines’
*sambV ‘cloud’, ‘sky’	hibim ‘sky’
*masi ‘orphan’	madu
*nj(a,e,i)- ‘burn’	si
*ŋga ‘2SG’	ga
*nVŋg- ‘know, hear, see’	nɔgɔ- ‘hear, know, listen to s.t.’
*kend(o,u)p ‘fire’	kɔlɔp
*kakV- ‘carry on shoulder’	kaku-
*kutV(mb,p)(a,u)[C] ‘long’	kalip
*kambu ‘ashes’	kɔu
*kakV- ‘carry on shoulder’	kaku-
*mbulikV ‘turn (oneself)’	purik
*sa(ŋg,k)asin ‘sand’	sak
*mV(k,ŋ)V[C] + t(e,i)- ‘vomit’	mohat (Nomu mekat ‘spittle’, Timbe mugat ‘be sick’)
*kVtak ‘new’	irak
(m,mb)elak ‘light, lightning’	belek ‘lightning’
*ok[V] ‘water’	(?) (gel-)ok ‘rain’
*mbalaŋ ‘flame’	balam
*(m,mb)elak ‘light, lightning’	belek
*mbilaŋ ‘tongue’	ni-bilam
*mbulikV ‘turn (oneself)’	purik
