= Teberan languages =

Papuan language family

Teberan
- Dadibi–Folopa
- Geographic distribution: Papua New Guinea
- Linguistic classification: Papuan Gulf?: Teberan–Pawaian; Teberan
- Subdivisions: Dadibi; Folopa (Podopa)

Language codes
- Glottolog: tebe1251
- Map: The Teberan languages of New Guinea The Teberan languages Trans–New Guinea languages Other Papuan languages Austronesian languages Uninhabited

The Teberan languages are a well established family of Papuan languages that Stephen Wurm (1975) grouped with the Pawaia language as a branch of the Trans–New Guinea phylum.

There are two Teberan languages, Dadibi and Folopa (Podopa). They are spoken in Southern Highlands Province and in adjoining provinces.

== Classification ==
Malcolm Ross (2005) tentatively retains both Teberan and Pawaia within TNG, but sees no other connection between them. Noting insufficient evidence, Pawley and Hammarström (2018) tentatively leave Teberan as unclassified rather than as part of Trans-New Guinea.

Pawley and Hammarström (2018) do not consider there to be sufficient evidence for Teberan to be classified as part of Trans-New Guinea, though they do note the following lexical resemblances between the Teberan languages and proto-Trans-New Guinea.

Dadibi:

- ami ‘breast’ < *amu

Folopa:

- kabu ‘stone’ < *ka(mb,m)u[CV]
- kolemane ‘star’ < *kala(a,i)m ‘moon’
- kile ‘eye’ < *(ŋg,k)iti

According to Dryer (2022), based on a preliminary quantitative analysis of data from the ASJP database, Teberan is likely to be a subgroup of Trans–New Guinea.

== Vocabulary comparison ==
Some lexical reconstructions by Usher (2020) are:

gloss	Proto-Dadibi-Folopa	Dadibi	Folopa
head	*tobo	tobo-lu	tobo
hair/feather	*ni[g]i	nisi	niki
ear/hear	*[w]odzo	olo ~ odo-	woso 'hear'; woseni 'ear'
eye	*ge[...]	ge-du	kele
nose	*gun...	guni	gunumu; kurumu
tongue	*kamina	hamina	
bone	*di[l/r]i	dili	diri
skin/bark	*wadz[i/e]	wali	wase
breast	*ame	ame	ame
dog	*j[o]wi	jowi ~ juwi	juwi
pig	*kibu	kibu	hupu
bird	*ba	ba	ba
egg/seed	*ge	ge	ke
tree/wood	*ni	ni	ni
woman/female	*so	so	so
sun/day	*s[u]g[a]	sogo	suka
water	*wẽi	wẽ	wẽi
fire/sun	*si[a]	sia	si
path/door	*tũ	tũ	tũ ~ tu
eat/drink	*nV-		n-/nuku- (present)
one/another	*me	me	me
