= Rumu language =

Papuan language spoken in Papua New Guinea

Rumu
- Kairi
- Region: Papua New Guinea
- Native speakers: (700 cited 1990)
- Language family: Papuan Gulf ?: Kikorian; Turama–Kikorian; Rumu

Language codes
- ISO 639-3: klq
- Glottolog: rumu1243

Rumu (Rumuwa), or Kairi (Kai-Iri), is a Papuan language of Papua New Guinea. Other names for it are Dumu (Tumu) and Kibiri.

== Phonology ==
Consonants
	Labial	Alveolar	Dorsal
Plosive	p	t	k
Fricative		(s)	h
Nasal	m	n	
Approximant	w	r	j

- /r/ is pronounced [l] when word-initial and before /ɛ a ɔ/.
- /w/ is [β] before /i e ɛ/.
- /s/ only occurs in loanwords.

Vowels
	Front	Central	Back
High	i		u
Mid-high	e ⟨ë⟩		o ⟨ö⟩
Mid-low	ɛ		ɔ
Low		a	

Diphthongs
	-i	-e	-ɛ	-a	-ɔ	-u
i-				ia	iɔ	
e-	(ei)			ea	eɔ	
ɛ-	ɛi			ɛa		ɛu
a-	ai	ae			aɔ	au
o-	(oi)	oe		oa		
ɔ-	ɔi		ɔɛ	ɔa		ɔu
u-	[ui]				uɔ	

- /ei/ has merged to [i] for many speakers.
- /oi/ has shifted to [ui] for many speakers.

Additionally, Rumu is tonal, distinguishing four tones: falling ⟨à⟩, rising ⟨á⟩, peaking ⟨â⟩, and level ⟨ā⟩.
