= Dibiyaso language =

Language spoken in Papua New Guinea

Dibiyaso
- Bainapi
- Region: Western Province, Papua New Guinea
- Native speakers: (2,000 cited 2000 census)
- Language family: Bosavi or unclassified: Dibiyaso

Language codes
- ISO 639-3: dby
- Glottolog: dibi1240
- ELP: Dibiyaso

Dibiyaso a.k.a. Bainapi is a Papuan language of Western Province, Papua New Guinea (Bamustu, Makapa, and Pikiwa villages).

== Classification ==
It is sometimes classified with the Bosavi languages. Søren Wichmann (2013) tentatively considers it to be a separate, independent group. Pawley and Hammarström (2018) note that similarities between Bosavi and Dibiyaso are likely due to loanwords, therefore leaving Dibiyaso as unclassified.

There is 19% lexical cognacy with Turumsa, suggesting contact or perhaps even a genetic relationship with Doso–Turumsa.

== Distribution ==
Dibiyaso is spoken in Bamustu (7.900569°S 142.982551°E), Makapa (7.937872°S 142.576135°E), and Pikiwa (7.905445°S 142.717106°E) villages of Gogodala Rural LLG, Western Province, Papua New Guinea.

== Vocabulary ==
The following basic vocabulary words are from Franklin and Voorhoeve (1973), Reesink (1976), and Shaw (1986), as cited in the Trans-New Guinea database:

| gloss | Dibiyaso |
|---|---|
| head | bisikoki; bisikɔki; dagata; dapokala |
| hair | bisikaka; bisi kaka |
| ear | kosoropa; kosořopa; kɔsɔrɔpa |
| eye | usa |
| nose | deimu; demu |
| tooth | beserepa; beseřepa |
| tongue | metata; mɛtɛtʌ; mɛtɛta |
| leg | tupa |
| louse | pe |
| dog | sapo |
| pig | apo |
| bird | meta; mɛta |
| egg | kwapa; motakapa |
| blood | balipa; baripa; memere |
| bone | ki |
| skin | baua |
| breast | bu; burukopa |
| tree | besa; bosa |
| man | sau |
| woman | tawa͗e; tawoi; tawɔi |
| sun | male; nane |
| moon | iliɛpɛ; irepe |
| water | daia; daiya |
| fire | betate; darau; dařau |
| stone | kaɔ; kɔ |
| road, path | iti |
| name | yo |
| eat | na- |
| one | makate |
| two | ařapa |
