= Duna people =

Duna
Total population
- Approximately 25,000

Regions with significant populations
- Southern Highlands, Papua New Guinea.

Languages
- Duna language

Religion
- Traditional beliefs, Christianity

Related ethnic groups
- Indigenous Papuan peoples of West Papua and Papua New Guinea, other Melanesians

The Duna are an indigenous people of Papua New Guinea (also known as Yuna) who live in the north-western area of the Southern Highlands Province. They number approximately 11,000 (1991) or 25,000 (2002) (Note: Unless otherwise noted, all information refers to: San Roque (2008))

== Society ==
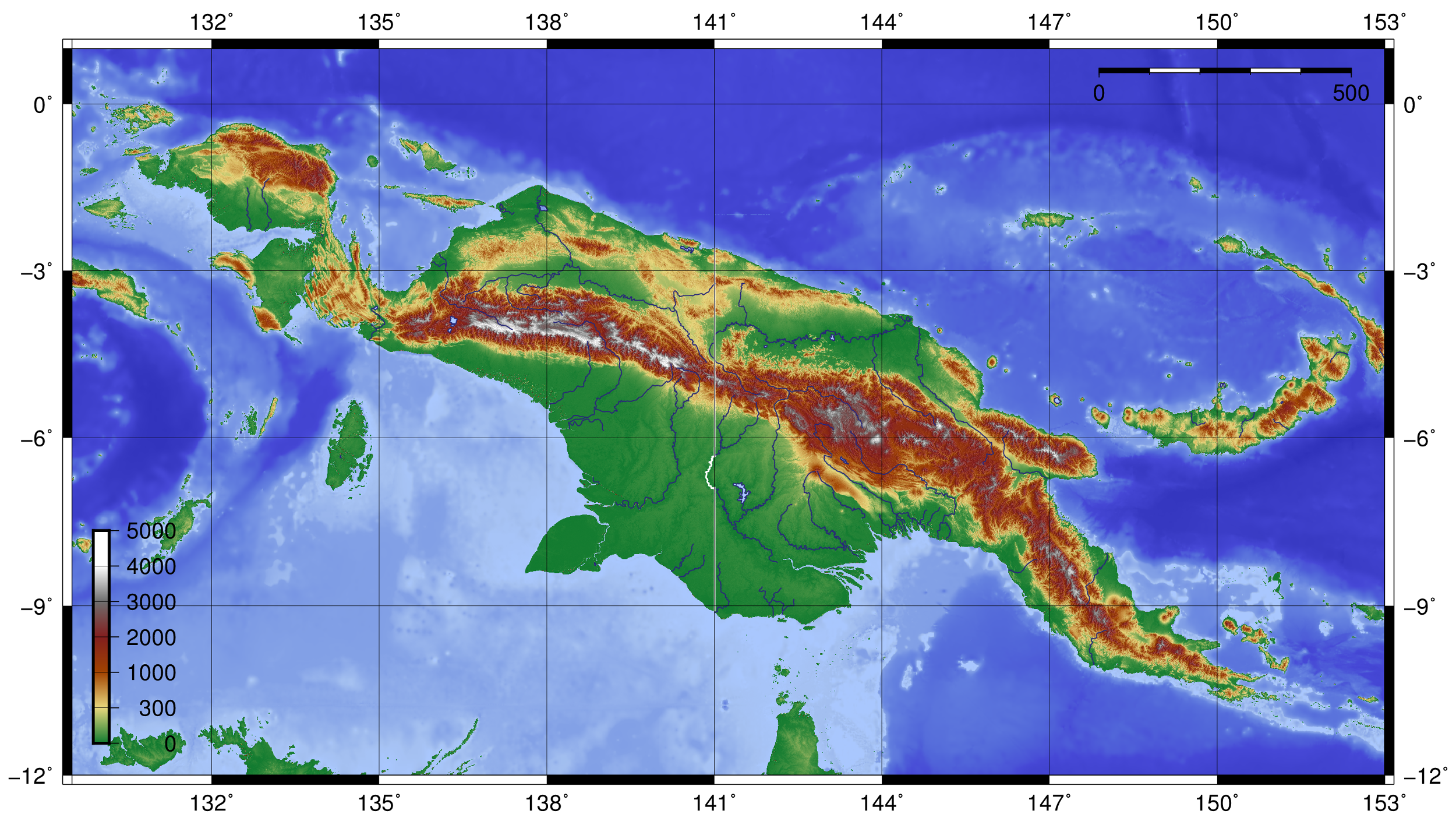
TNG is strongly associated with the New Guinea Highlands (red)

Duna is the native language of the polysemically named Duna people. Their environment lies in a mountainous terrain with altitudes ranging from 400 to 3000 meters. With an even distribution of rainfall (4500mm annually) and temperatures (18.5 to 28 °C), the environment allows farming and some tree cultivation. This is why most Duna are substance farmers with sweet potatoes being the staple food, alongside other gardened fruit and vegetables. Furthermore, they keep domesticated pigs and trap fish in Lake Kopiago while also hunting smaller game such as possums, bats and smaller birds. The diet also includes gathered mushrooms, ferns and cresses.

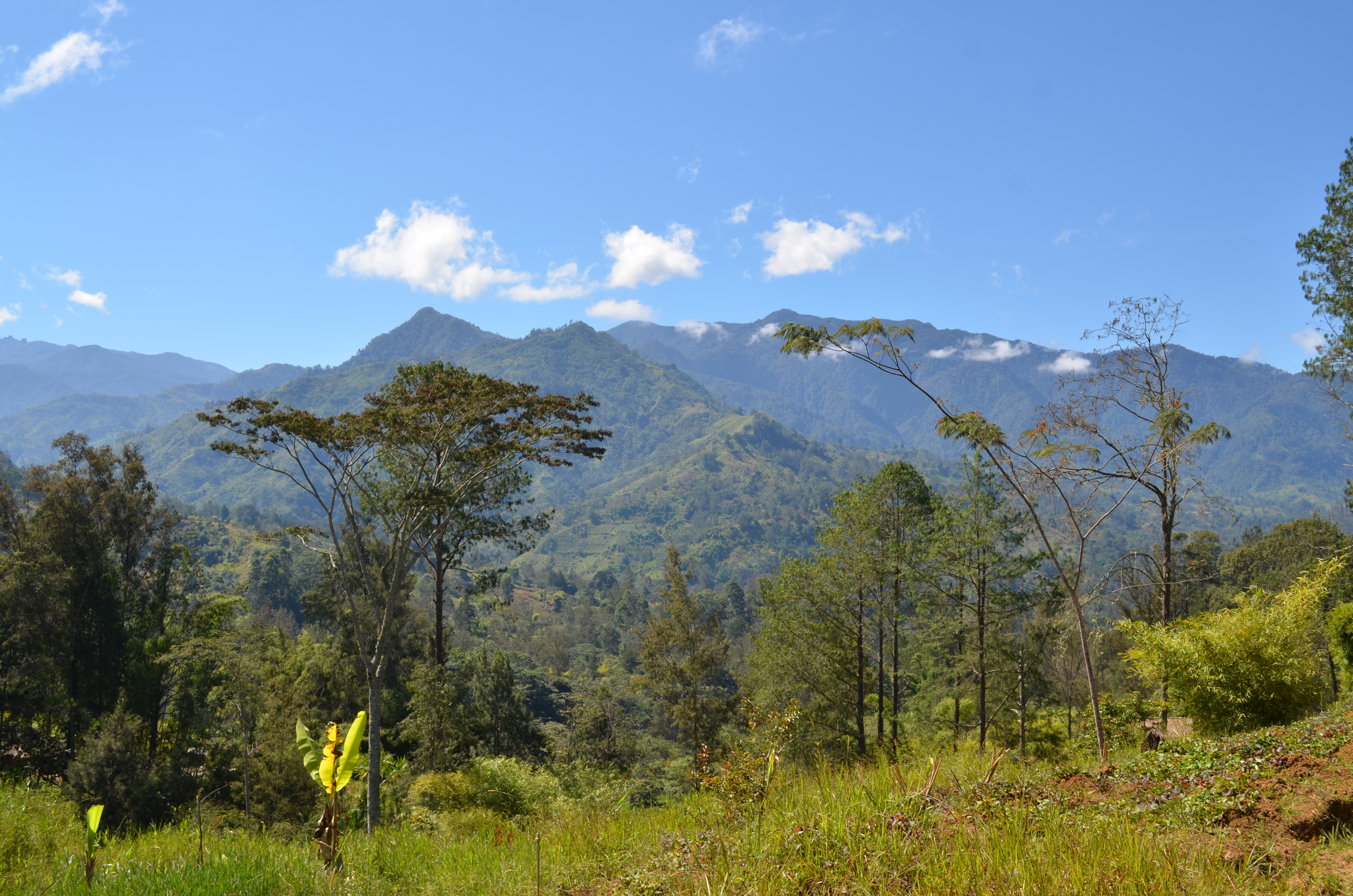
Papua New Guinea Highlands

The Duna are grouped in clans and parishes. Each member shares extensive responsibilities, requiring a substantial social effort for the group. Before the first direct contact with Europeans around the 1930s, their culture involved a strict separation of males and females. Early on, boys are separately raised and trained into manhood. Other significant themes of pre-contact life include ordered warfare, courting and the potency of ritual sacrifice. Since the establishment of a government station in the 1950s by Australia, the customs and traditions have undergone some significant changes, community schooling etc.

== Economy ==
There is only little paid work available in the area and electricity or telecommunication networks are not regularly accessible. The region does have a large health centre near Kopiago and a community school up to 8th grade. The Highland Highway is part of the overland transport network, but it is intermittent and in poor condition, so that most traveling is done on foot. Flights go fairly regular weekly or twice-weekly to Kopiago (Note: The airport is operated by the Mission Aviation Fellowship out of Mount Hagen in Western Highlands Province).
