= Selepet Rural LLG =

Local-level government in Papua New Guinea

- Location within Papua New Guinea
- Coordinates: 6.154741°S 147.189551°E
- Country: Papua New Guinea
- Province: Morobe Province
- Time zone: UTC+10 (AEST)

Selepet Rural LLG is a local-level government (LLG) of Morobe Province, Papua New Guinea. The Selepet language is spoken in the LLG.

== Wards ==
- 02. Nimbako
- 03. Wap
- 04. Sorong/Kusin
- 05. Dengop
- 06. Konimdo
- 07. Selepet
- 08. Indum 2
- 09. Indum 1
- 10. Weke
- 11. Dollo
- 12. Kamandu
- 13. Gilang
- 14. Hupat
- 15. Tipsit
- 16. Dengondo
- 17. Bomu/Gotoro
- 18. Iloko
- 19. Kabwum Station
