= Omati River =

River in Papua New Guinea

Omati River Opuia River
- Location within Papua New Guinea

Location
- Country: Papua New Guinea
- Region: Gulf Province

Physical characteristics
- Source
  - location: Southern Highlands, Papua New Guinea
  - elevation: 600 m (2,000 ft)
- Mouth: Gulf of Papua
  - coordinates: 7°44′07″S 144°11′09″E
  - elevation: 0 m (0 ft)
- Length: 146 km (91 mi)
- Basin size: 1,600 km^{2} (620 mi^{2})
- Discharge
  - location: Near mouth
  - average: 243 m^{3}/s (8,600 cu ft/s)

Basin features
- Progression: Gulf of Papua
- River system: Omati River

The Omati River is a river in southern Papua New Guinea.

== See also ==
- List of rivers of Papua New Guinea
- List of rivers of Oceania
- Southern New Guinea freshwater swamp forests
- Omati language
- Omati River languages
