= Fasu language =

Kutubuan language of New Guinea

Fasu
- West Kutubuan, Namo Me
- Region: New Guinea
- Native speakers: (1,200 cited 1981) (750 Fasu, 300 Namuni, 150 Some)
- Language family: Papuan Gulf ?: Kikorian; Kutubuan; Fasu
- Dialects: Some; Kaibu (Kaipu); Namome (Namumi, Namuni)

Language codes
- ISO 639-3: faa
- Glottolog: fasu1242
- ELP: Fasu
- Map: The Fasu language of New Guinea The Fasu language Trans–New Guinea languages Other Papuan languages Austronesian languages Uninhabited

Fasu, also known as Namo Me, is one of the Kutubuan languages of New Guinea.

== Varieties ==
Wurm and Hattori (1981) considered its three principal dialects, Fasu, Some and Namumi, to be three languages, which they called the West Kutubuan family. However, Glottolog and Usher consider Fasu to be a single language.

== Classification ==
Fasu is not particularly close to the two East Kutubuan languages, though Usher reconfirms a connection.

Although Fasu has proto-TNG vocabulary, Malcolm Ross considers its traditional inclusion in TNG to be somewhat questionable. Other researchers agree.
