= Fembe language =

Trans–New Guinea language spoken in Papua New Guinea

Fembe
- Agala
- Native to: Papua New Guinea
- Native speakers: (350 cited 1986)
- Language family: Trans–New Guinea: East Strickland; Upper East Strickland; Fembe

Language codes
- ISO 639-3: agl
- Glottolog: femb1238
- ELP: Fembe

Fembe, or Agala, is a Trans–New Guinea language of New Guinea, spoken in the plains east of the Strickland River.
