= Kutubuan languages =

Languages families in Papua New Guinea

Kutubuan
- Laku Kutubu
- Geographic distribution: Lake Kutubu region, Southern Highlands Province, Papua New Guinea
- Linguistic classification: Papuan Gulf ?: Kikorian; Kutubuan
- Subdivisions: East Kutubuan; West Kutubuan

Language codes
- Glottolog: None

The Kutubuan languages are a small family of neighboring languages families in Papua New Guinea. They are named after Lake Kutubu in Papua New Guinea.

== Languages ==
There has been some debate over whether they are closer to each other than to other languages, but Usher includes them both in the Kikorian branch of the tentative Papuan Gulf stock. Within the two branches, the lexicostatistical figures are 60–70%. Between the two branches, they are 10–20%.

- East Kutubuan
  - Foe, Fiwaga
- West Kutubuan
  - Fasu, Some, Namumi

== Lexical reconstruction ==
Some lexical reconstructions by Usher (2020) are:

gloss	Proto-Lake Kutubu
head	*uni
hair/feather(s)	*iti
eye/sixteen	*hʲĩ
nose	*sabe
tooth	*mete
tongue	*atu
foot/leg	*kotage
bone	*kigi
skin/bark	*ga[o/u]
breast	*hʲokõ
dog	*g[e/ẽ/a]s[a/ã]
pig/game	*mena
bird	*hʲaka
egg	*kapa
tree	*ita
moon	*he̝ge̝
water	*hẽ
fire	*ita
stone	*kana
path	*ig[i]a
eat/drink	*ne-
one	*hʲaga

== Modern reflexes ==
Proposed Kutubu reflexes of proto-Trans-New Guinea (pTNG) etyma are:

Foi language:

- gage- ‘carry on back’ < *kak(i,u)
- ku- ‘die’ < *kumV-
- na- ‘eat’ < *na-
- korage ‘leg’ < *k(a,o)ondok[V]
- gariko ‘neck’ < *k(a,e)(nd,t)ak
- ira ‘tree’ < *inda
- kuba ‘wind’ < *kumbutu
- ya ‘bird’ < *yaka(i)
- babo ‘mother’s sister’ < *mbamba ‘older same sex sibling’

Fasu language:

- ku- ‘die’ < *kumV-
- na- ‘eat’ < *na-
- reke- ‘stand’ < ta,e,i)k[V]
- ama ‘mother’ < *am(a,i)
- apa ‘father’ < *apa
- himu ‘heart, stomach’ < *simb(i,u)
- iti ‘hair’ < *iti[C]
- korake ‘leg’ < *k(a,o)ndok[V]
- kinu ‘shoulder’ < *kinV
- kau ‘skin’ < *k(a,o)(nd,t)apu
- sikini ‘hand’ < *sa(ŋg,k)(a,i)l
- pisi ‘urine’ < *pisi
- mane(raka) ‘make the law’ < *mana ‘instructions’
- horop ‘long’ < *k(o,u)ti(mb,p)V
- api(a) ‘husband’ < *ambi ‘man’
- papa ‘mother’s sister’ < *mbamba ‘older same sex sibling’
- ira ‘tree’ < *inda
- sakipu ‘sand’ < *sa(ŋg,k)asiŋ
- kupa ‘wind’ < *kumbutu

== Vocabulary comparison ==
The following basic vocabulary words are from Franklin (1975), Franklin & Voorhoeve (1973), McElhanon and Voorhoeve (1970), and Shaw (1986), as cited in the Trans-New Guinea database:

The words cited constitute translation equivalents, whether they are cognate (e.g. auřu, airu, alu for “tongue”) or not (e.g. weḷia, kakusa, yapi for “blood”).

gloss	Foi	Fasu (Namumi dial.)	Fasu
head	a̧řuhai	unahaie	wamo
hair	u̧sæ̧	unahai iti	iti; uni iti
ear	yo ḳʰiyʌ	sinaeki; sinæki	senaki
eye	i̧y	hi̧; hĩ	hi; hi̧; hĩ
nose	s̭abɛi	sapasuma	sape
tooth	ṱi	akai	mere
tongue	auřu	airu	alu; aru
leg	ṱamʌ	kofai; kɔfai	korake
louse	ṱʌbʌľi		yapani
dog	ḳɛsʌ	kasa	kasa
pig		girɔ	saro
bird	yaʔ	minai	mena
egg	hʌ̧ⁱ	hai	mena hai
blood	weḷia	kakusa	yapi
bone	kʰikʰi	kiki	kiki
skin	ḳaḳo	kau	kau
breast	o̧ḳo̧	hotu; hɔtu	hoko
tree	iʔʌ	ira	ira
man	amɛnʌ	abano; abanɔ	aporo
woman	ḳa̧·	hinamu	hinamo
sun	iřiyapo	iya; maiya; maya	maiya; maĩya
moon	hɛḳɛ	hɩki	heke
water	ipu	hi̧; hĩ	hẽ; hȩ; hę
fire	iřʌ	irə kipu; irʌkupi	dufi; ira lufi
stone	kʰa̧nʌ	ɩki	eke
name	yaᵽo	iyanu	yano
eat	niyæi	nesi	anene; na
one	mɛna̧ḳɛ	hakasa; nakasa	meno
two	ha̧ḳɛ	tita	teta
