= Konai language =

Trans–New Guinea language of Papua New Guinea

Konai
- Native to: Papua New Guinea
- Native speakers: (600 cited 1991)
- Language family: Trans–New Guinea: East Strickland; Peripheral; Konai

Language codes
- ISO 639-3: kxw
- Glottolog: kona1242

Konai is a Trans–New Guinea language of New Guinea, spoken on the west bank of the Strickland River.

== Phonology ==
Konai has 6 vowels. All of them can be nasalized. The ou with inverted breve actually has a regular inverted breve centered between the two letters.

Further information about the phonology of Konai can be found in Årsjö & Årsjö (2005).

=== Vowels (orthographic) ===
	Front	Front nas.	Back	Back nas.
Close	i	i̱	u	u̱
Close-mid			o͡u	o͟͡u
Open-mid	e	e̱	o	o̱
Open			a	a̱

=== Consonants (orthographic) ===
	Bilabial	Dental	Alveolar	Retroflex	Palatal	Velar	Glottal
Voiceless plosive	(p)	t				k	
Voiced plosive	b	d				g	
Nasal/liquid	m	n ~ l					
Voiceless fricative	f		s				h
Central approximant	w				j		

== Sample ==
Toguei e̱ hegie degei. E̲ hegie ta mo͟͡uma nalamo͟͡u fima̱i̱. Toguei kaha̱ wai duguo, wai habiya kaha̱ awaimo͡u dugu. Toguei kaha̱ tawai, ke̱me na̱didade tawai. Kelege e̱ wai habiya koko͡u bo͡ufa̱i̱. Wai kaha̱ gofo͟͡u hiyedo degei. Toguei ka̱ha̱ suwa koko͡u gologumo͡u, e̱ toguei wolo saga̱i̱ degei. Na̱ hobo͡u a̱ woda. Sawisie ta hobo͡u a̱ na̱ dogo͡ugulo. Wai kaha̱ ye̱i̱. Yo̱ma mei degeimo͡u tobou, na̱ kugo͡u degeife̱i̱, a̱ na̱ dogo͡uguloyode tobou. Kegemo͡u, toguei e̱ kama fau. Kelege wai e̱me dibiko͡u ile tiei. O bolo̱u̱ dilie suluguali dugu, wai tilamo͡u dugu. Dile wai tageto͡u neke hebele file̱i̱. Wai nekeye̱ tou. Mowi suluguadi o ke̱dilie ho̱ho̱ degele i. Mowi suluguadi o ke̱dilie tiasiei. Wai e̱ tieli mei, gue̱ degeimo͡u.

'The rat was hungry. He thought about his hunger and what to eat. He saw a pig, and he saw the pig's tail moving. The rat thought it could be eaten. So he sunk his teeth into the pig's tail. The pig became very angry. The rat having bitten his tail, he (the pig) wanted to kill him. "You cannot kill me. Another time I can help you." The pig laughed. Having laughed he said, "How can you help me?" So the rat ran away. Then the pig went and slept in the bush. Two men walking around saw him lying there. The two of them threw a net on top of him. The pig was trapped by the net. The two hunters rejoiced. They slept. The pig did not sleep, he was afraid.'
