= Timbuwarra =

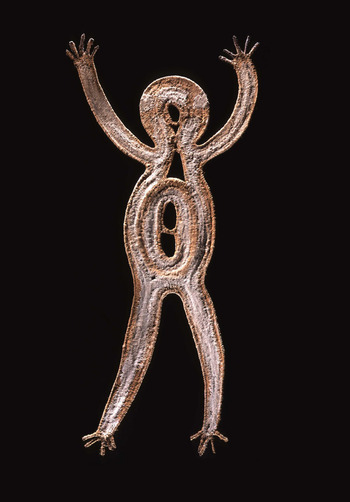
A timbuwarra

The timbuwarra, or timbuwara (tentatively translated as "spirit of the flesh which guards the doors"), is a type of ritual figure produced by the Wiru people of the Southern Highlands Province of Papua New Guinea. Timbuwarra figures are generally made of rattan and painted, and may serve several functions, although they are generally held to be associated with fertility rites and with the spirit world. Few are known to exist, and their purpose is generally poorly understood.

Timbuwarra are flat, woven, and anthropomorphic. Usually they are made of rattan and painted with ochre pigments in earth tones; they may also be further decorated with cassowary feathers and beads. They may sometimes also take the form of animals. The figures are created by elders during times of disaster, such as disease, earthquake, or famine. The uses of the timbuwarra are varied; they are most often seen as guardian figures outside of ceremonial houses, which are constructed at some distance from the village. They would sometimes be used in mourning rituals, and have been described as representations of dead women to which respects may be paid by friends and relatives; the status of the women and their manner of death is not known. Sometimes, timbuwarra would also be used during male initiation rites to teach boys about sexual behavior. One collector has recorded:

One of these that I had had two holes down in the abdomen area – one above the other. I was told that this was used to teach the young men which hole to aim for during sex to avoid pregnancy.

They were also sometimes carried or worn by village men during fertility rites; when worn, they were often attached to a ceremonial wig in a fashion known locally as "female pinned by a penis to the wig".

Once timbuwarra have outlived their purpose, they are buried to refertilize the earth from which they were formed. A small number, however, have found their way into Western collections in more recent years; an example exists in the Art Gallery of New South Wales, while others are held privately. The practice of making them died out with the coming of Catholic missionaries in the 1950s, and few are made today.
