= Samo language (New Guinea) =

Language spoken in Papua New Guinea

Samo
- Region: New Guinea
- Native speakers: (900 cited 2001)
- Language family: Trans–New Guinea: East Strickland; Samo

Language codes
- ISO 639-3: smq
- Glottolog: samo1303

Samo, also known as Daba, Nomad, and Supei, is a Trans–New Guinea language of New Guinea, spoken in the plains east of the Strickland River in Western Province of Papua New Guinea. It has switch-reference marking for the subject of a clause.
