= Tua River (Papua New Guinea) =

Tua
- Location within Papua New Guinea

Physical characteristics
- Mouth
  - location: Purari River basin
  - coordinates: 6°30′00″S 144°28′00″E

Basin features
- Tributaries
  - left: Erave

The Tua River is a tributary of the Purari River of Papua New Guinea. It originates in the Eastern Highlands Province and flows through the highlands of the Simbu Province, where it joins the Pio River, giving rise to the Purari.

== Geography ==
The Tua River has several tributaries, in particular the Erave River, which in turn has the Iaro River as its own tributary. The Waghi River is also a major tributary, which rises in Jiwaka Province and flows through the expansive Waghi Valley. Another tributary is the Chimbu River.

== History ==
During the formation of the volcanoes of Soaru Range and Mount Karimui, the river's course was temporarily blocked, which caused the formation of a short-lived lake.

== See also ==
- Tua River languages
