= Duna–Pogaya languages =

Proposed Trans–New Guinea language branch

Duna–Pogaya
- Duna–Bogaia
- Geographic distribution: Hela Province, Papua New Guinea
- Linguistic classification: Trans–New Guinea: Duna–Pogaya
- Subdivisions: Duna; Bogaya

Language codes
- Glottolog: None
- Map: The Duna–Pogaya languages of New Guinea The Duna–Pogaya languages Other Trans–New Guinea languages Other Papuan languages Austronesian languages Uninhabited

The Duna–Pogaya (Duna–Bogaia) languages are a proposed small family of Trans–New Guinea languages in the classification of Voorhoeve (1975), Ross (2005) and Usher (2018), consisting of two languages, Duna and Bogaya, which in turn form a branch of the larger Trans–New Guinea family. Glottolog, which is based largely on Usher, however finds the connections between the two languages to be tenuous, and the connection to TNG unconvincing.

== Language contact ==
Duna has had significant influence on Bogaya due to the socioeconomic dominance of Duna speakers over the less populous, less influential Bogaya speakers. Duna also has much more influence from Huli (a widely spoken Trans-New Guinea language) at 27–32 percent lexical similarity with Huli, while Duna has only 5–10 percent.

== Pronouns ==
Pronouns are:

	sg	du	pl
1	*nó	*ge-na	*i-nu
2	*gó
3	*kó		*ki-nu

== Vocabulary comparison ==
The following basic vocabulary words are from McElhanon & Voorhoeve (1970), Shaw (1973), and Shaw (1986), as cited in the Trans-New Guinea database.

The words cited constitute translation equivalents, whether they are cognate (e.g. ɔwa, hewa for "sun") or not (e.g. fando, tete for "louse").

gloss	Bogaya	Duna
head	yeľʌ; yela	kuni
hair	heepi; yeľʌ eľika	hini
ear	hona; hɔnʌn	kɔhane; konane
eye	kina; kiːnʌn	le
nose	kuuma; pfouľu	kuma
tooth	yagai; yʌkʌi	ne; nee
tongue	iki; ɩkin	ogone; ɔgɔne
leg	yehei; yehʌi	tia
louse	fando; fiľʌ	tete
dog	ɔv̧ɔpi; yau	yawi
pig	ʌpʌn	isa
bird	aka; pitʌkʌ	heka
egg	oondi; pitʌkʌ ɔ̃udi	hapa
blood	sokoya; yesʌ	kuyila
bone	hakale; hʌv̧ʌľe	kuni
skin	hugwa; hukuʌn	pulu
breast	alu; ʌľu	abu; adu; amu
tree	dowa; tɔuʌ	lowa; lɔwa
man	ami; ʌmĩ	anoa; anɔa
woman	ĩmiʌ; imya	ima
sun	owa; ɔwa	hewa
moon	kaiyuu; kʌiu	eke
water	paiyuku; pʌiuku	yu
fire	dowada; tɔun	lɔwa kiliana; lowa puru
stone	haana; hʌnʌ	kana; kuna
name	ʌmĩn; yaga	yaka
eat	nã; nosii	nai-; neyana
one	mɔsʌ kɔmʌ; moso	du
two	efʌn; yeefa	yapa

== Evolution ==
Duna reflexes of proto-Trans–New Guinea (pTNG) etyma are:

- amu ‘breast’ < *amu
- konane ‘ear’ < *kand(e,i)k(V]
- kuni ‘bone’ < *kondaC
