= Wiru people =

Indigenous people of Papua New Guinea

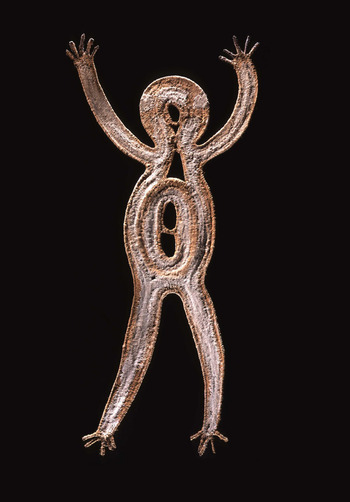

The Wiru are a people of the Southern Highlands Province of Papua New Guinea. They speak the Wiru language. Among their rituals is the production of timbuwarra out of rattan.

Wiru ancestors said to be much taller than modern population and are referred as "giants". It is alleged that bones of these ancestors can be found on mountain tops between Soaru Range and confluence of the Polu and Tua rivers.
