= Doso language =

Language of New Guinea, PNG

Doso
- Native to: Papua New Guinea
- Native speakers: (2,400 cited 2000)
- Language family: Papuan Gulf ?: Strickland; Doso–Turumsa; Doso

Language codes
- ISO 639-3: dol
- Glottolog: doso1239

Doso is a language of New Guinea. It has 61% of its vocabulary in common with the nearly extinct Turumsa language, its only clear relative. It is spoken near Kamula but does not appear to be related to it; not enough is known to tell if it may be related to other languages in the area.

== Vocabulary ==
The following basic vocabulary words are from Shaw (1986), as cited in the Trans-New Guinea database:

gloss	Doso
head	abaki
hair	abuluso
ear	apu
eye	usa
nose	bulu
tooth	da
tongue	ithi
leg	sʌřei
louse	amu
dog	khasa
pig	nɛna
bird	sɩkĩ
egg	wõnõ
blood	omani
bone	khi
skin	bʌli
breast	toka
tree	gu
man	haimo
woman	dobo
sun	khikha
moon	ři
water	umu
fire	dɩki
stone	kɔ
name	samu
eat	nane
