= Fiwaga language =

Language

Fiwaga
- Region: Papua New Guinea
- Native speakers: (300 cited 1981)
- Language family: Papuan Gulf ?: Kikorian; Kutubuan; East Kutubuan; Fiwaga

Language codes
- ISO 639-3: fiw
- Glottolog: fiwa1240

Fiwaga (Fimaga, Fiwage) is a Papuan language of Papua New Guinea.

Pronouns are:

	sg	du	pl
1	ano	eto teto*	re
2	né	tetā	i
3	e	isu	–

*Eto is exclusive, teto inclusive.
