= Morori language =

Language in Papua

Morori
- Marori, Moraori
- Region: Kampung Wasur, Merauke Regency, South Papua, Indonesia
- Ethnicity: Marori; 250 (1998)
- Native speakers: (50 cited 1998)
- Language family: Trans–New Guinea: Southwest Coast; Kolopom; Morori
- Dialects: Menge †

Language codes
- ISO 639-3: mok
- Glottolog: moro1289
- ELP: Marori
- Map: The Morori language of New Guinea The Morori language (near the southern cape) Other Trans–New Guinea languages Other Papuan languages Austronesian languages Uninhabited

Morori (Marori, Moaraeri, Moraori, Morari) is a moribund Papuan language of the Kolopom branch of the Trans–New Guinea family. It is separated from the other Kolopom languages by the intrusive Marind family. All speakers use Papuan Malay or Indonesian as L2, and many know Marind.

A dialect extinct in 1997, Menge, is remembered from ceremonial use.

Marori is spoken in Kampung Wasur, which in 2010 had 413 people (98 families) total and 119 Marori people (52 Marori families).

== Phonology ==
Marori has 22 consonants and 6 vowels, which are:

		Labial	Alveolar	Palatal	Velar	Glottal
Nasal		m	n	ɲ	ŋ	
Plosive	prenasal	ᵐb	ⁿd	ⁿʤ	ᵑɡ	
Plosive	voiced	b	d		ɡ	
Plosive	voiceless	p	t		k	
Fricative		ɸ	s			h
Approximant		w	l	j		
Rhotic			r			

Vowels
i, e, æ, a, o, u

On the other hand, the majority of Trans-New Guinea languages usually have around 10–15 consonants.

== Pronouns ==
Pronouns, but little else, connect it to TNG:

	sg	pl
1	na	ni-ɛ
2	ka	ki-ɛ
3	ŋɡafi	ŋɡamdɛ

== Vocabulary ==
The following basic vocabulary words are from Voorhoeve (1975), as cited in the Trans-New Guinea database:

gloss	Morori
head	merao
hair	pu
eye	ayix
tooth	terox
leg	tegu
louse	nemeŋk
dog	koro
pig	bosik
bird	ujif
egg	vi
blood	ŋgorom
bone	ŋgwar
skin	par
tree	kwi
man	yexri
sun	kum
water	deke
fire	sir
stone	mere
name	nex
eat	kef
one	sekodu
two	yenadu

== Evolution ==
Marori reflexes of proto-Trans-New Guinea (pTNG) etyma are:

- mam ‘breast’ < *amu
- mam ‘mother’ < *am(a,i)
- nemeŋk ‘louse’ < *niman
- sa ‘sand’ < *sa(ŋg,k)asiŋ
- ŋwar ‘bone’ < *kondaC
