= Paiela/Hewa Rural LLG =

Local-level government in Papua New Guinea

- Location within Papua New Guinea
- Coordinates: 5.35°S 142.89°E
- Country: Papua New Guinea
- Province: Enga Province
- Time zone: UTC+10 (AEST)

Paiela/Hewa Rural LLG is a local-level government (LLG) of Enga Province, Papua New Guinea.

== Wards ==
- 01. Aspringa
- 02. Piawe-Bealo
- 03. Ingilepe
- 04. Kolombi Central
- 05. Waimalama
- 06. Komanga
- 07. Takopa
- 08. Taronga
- 09. Andita
- 10. Kole-Kanjiawi
- 11. Mandaukale
- 12. Papaki
- 13. Mt. Kare
- 14. Waiyalima
- 15. Paiela Station
- 16. Weyonga
