= Odoodee language =

Trans–New Guinea language

Odoodee
- Nomad
- Native to: Papua New Guinea
- Native speakers: 490 (2002)
- Language family: Trans–New Guinea: East Strickland; Odoodee

Language codes
- ISO 639-3: kkc
- Glottolog: odoo1238
- ELP: Odoodee

Odoodee (Ododei) is a Trans–New Guinea language of New Guinea, spoken in the plains east of the Strickland River. It is also called Tomu, after the river along which it is found, and Nomad. It has two dialects, the Hesif dialect and the Kalamo dialect.
