= Gobasi language =

Trans–New Guinea language spoken in New Guinea

Gobasi
- Nomad
- Go꞉bosi
- Region: New Guinea
- Native speakers: 1,000 (2016)
- Language family: Trans–New Guinea: East Strickland; Gobasi
- Dialects: Oibae; Bibo; Honibo

Language codes
- ISO 639-3: goi
- Glottolog: goba1246

Gobasi, also known as Gebusi, Gobosi or Nomad, is a Trans–New Guinea language of New Guinea, spoken in the plains east of the Strickland River.

There are different varieties of Gobasi. They are known as the Oibae, Bibo and Honibo dialects.
