= East Kutubuan languages =

Papuan languages

East Kutubuan
- East Kutubu
- Geographic distribution: New Guinea
- Linguistic classification: Papuan Gulf ?: Kikorian; Kutubuan; East Kutubuan
- Subdivisions: Fiwaga; Foi

Language codes
- ISO 639-3: –
- Glottolog: east2499
- Map: The East Kutubuan languages of New Guinea The East Kutubuan languages Trans–New Guinea languages Other Papuan languages Austronesian languages Uninhabited

The East Kutubuan languages are a small family of Trans–New Guinea languages (TNG) in the classification of Malcolm Ross. There are just two languages,

Fiwaga and Foi,

which are not close to the West Kutubuan languages. These were linked in a "Kutubuan" family by Franklin and Voorhoeve in 1973, but there is some debate over whether they are closer to each other than to other Kikorian languages. Although East Kutubuan has proto-TNG vocabulary, Ross considers its inclusion in TNG to be questionable.
