= Turama–Kikorian languages =

Language family

Turama–Kikorian
- Rumu – Omati River
- Geographic distribution: Omati River region, Gulf Province, Papua New Guinea
- Linguistic classification: Papuan Gulf ?: Kikorian; Turama–Kikorian
- Subdivisions: Turama; Rumu

Language codes
- Glottolog: tura1263
- Map: The Turama–Kikorian languages of New Guinea The Turama–Kikorian languages Trans–New Guinea languages Other Papuan languages Austronesian languages Uninhabited

The Turama–Kikorian languages are a family identified by Arthur Capell (1962) and part of the Trans–New Guinea languages (TNG) family in the classifications of Stephen Wurm (1975) and Malcolm Ross (2005). The family is named after the Turama River and Kikori River of southern Papua New Guinea; the alternative name is based more narrowly on the Omati River.

== Languages ==
The four languages are clearly related, though Rumu is divergent. Ross states that Rumu links the other (Turama) languages to TNG.

- Turama–Kikorian family
  - Rumu (Kairi) isolate
  - Turama (Omati River) branch: Omati, Ikobi

== Proto-language ==
Some lexical reconstructions by Usher (2020) are:

gloss	Proto-Rumu-Omati	Proto-Omati River	Rumu
head/top	*mab	*mab	mapô
leaf/hair/feather	*b[au]t	*bɔt	?paɾâu
ear	*go̝	*go̝	kō
eye	*isĩ	*isĩ	ihī
nose	*ju	*ju	jū
tooth	*magu	*magu	makù
foot/leg	*tãᵋ	*tãᵋ	ɾɛ̂
bone	*tab	*tab	ɾapò
breast	*sõ̝	*sõ̝	hó
louse	*gutɔm	*gutɔm	kuɾɔ̀
dog	*gas	*gas	ká ~ kaé
pig	*gɔ[u]n	*gɔn	kɔù
bird	*gaᵋ	*gaᵋ	ká ~ kaé
egg	*d[ɔ]um	*d[ɔ]um	
tree	*i	*i	ì
sun	*ɛsɔa	*ɛsɔa	ɛhɔ̂
water	*wẽ̝	*wẽ̝	
fire	*i	*i	ì
path	*dɛⁱ	*dɛⁱ	tɛî
name	*e̝ne̝ne̝n	*ne̝ne̝n	enené
two	*t[aⁱ/aᵋ]	*taᵋ	taí

== Basic vocabulary ==
The following basic vocabulary words are from Franklin (1973), as cited in the Trans-New Guinea database. The sets of words are not necessarily cognate.

gloss	Rumu	Ikobi-Mena	Mena	Omati
head	wotu rapo	mapʰ	mabo	mawo
hair	pate	maporo	maboru	mahabero
ear	ku pate	kupi	kovi	kovi
eye	ihita	si(tom)	sitɔumu	isi
nose	yu rapo	bopʰ	boƀo	sorowu
tooth	maku	ka̧i̧ yo	kaiyɔ	kokame
tongue	ɔhɔ	kumen	kumɛn	komene
leg	re riki	hae	hại habo	hai
louse	kuro	kurom	kuromiə	kulamu
dog	ka	kas	kasə	kase
bird	ka	kae	kaiɛ	kae
egg	re	tʌom	tʌmɛ	mena hai
blood	hokore	kai	kai	kei
bone	rapo	hap	havo	havo
skin	heitau	kora	kʷaru	kebo
breast	hɔ	so̧	so; šo	šu
tree	i	i	ʔi	
man	uki	wane	wɔnami; wɔne	gamin
woman	wo	besi	bɛse	bes
sun	eho	iyos	yosə; yosu	soa
moon	pari	wasiba	wasibia; wasibʌŋʌ	baira
water	u	mu̧	mu	fae
fire	i	kom	kumu	kumu
stone	akapu	kam	kamə	kamu
name	paina	nanini	nɛnɛne	nenena
eat	nato	nokun; nouwe	nʌᵘwe	damanai
one	riabai; ṛiabai	sʌkanɛ	sʌkanɛ	sakaina
two	tai	hae	haiɛ	hatarari
