= East Strickland languages =

Language family of Papua New Guinea

East Strickland
- Strickland River
- Geographic distribution: Strickland River region, Western Province and South Highlands Province, Papua New Guinea
- Linguistic classification: Papuan Gulf ?: Strickland; East Strickland

Language codes
- Glottolog: east2433
- Map: The East Strickland languages of New Guinea The East Strickland languages Trans–New Guinea languages Other Papuan languages Austronesian languages Uninhabited

The East Strickland or Strickland River languages are a family of Papuan languages.

== Languages ==
The East Strickland languages actually form a language continuum. Shaw (1986) recognizes six languages, which are:

- Upper: Fembe (Agala), Konai
- Odoodee (Tomu)
- Central/Middle: Gobasi (Nomad), Kubo, Samo (Daba)

Gobasi, Odoodee and Samo, but especially Gobasi, are also known as "Nomad".

== Pronouns ==
Pronouns are:

	sg	du	pl
1	*na, *ã	*o-li, *a-la	*oi
2	*nõ	*nĩ-le	*nĩ
3	*yõ	*i-le	*yã, *di

== Vocabulary comparison ==
The following basic vocabulary words are from McElhanon & Voorhoeve (1970), Shaw (1973), and Shaw (1986), as cited in the Trans-New Guinea database.

The words cited constitute translation equivalents, whether they are cognate (e.g. ulugib, ulukib, ulʌkib for “head”) or not (e.g. dob, helehai, tano for “one”).

gloss	Fembe	Gobasi (Oibae dial.)	Gobasi (Bibo dial.)	Gobasi (Honibo dial.)	Gobasi	Konai	Kubo	Odoodee (Hesif dial.)	Odoodee (Kalamo dial.)	Samo
head	widua; wɔdiɔ	ulugib	ukib; ulukib	uligib	ulʌkib	wudio	odiu; wodio; wodiyo	uľugi	wiligi	ukibi; ulagibi; ulʌgibi
hair	wigiduae; wɔdiɔ tɔwɔ	orɔwɔ	otowa; tawa	utoʌ; utowa	o dɔsɔ	wudio towe	tɔwɛ; wodio toi; wodiyo toi	uľu tu	wudu	otowa; tawa; ulʌgibi
ear	du	dulu	dul; duːr	dulu	dulo	kʌhẽ	du; duwëw	dulu	dulu	duli; duːri
eye	d̲iho; gihã	hiɔ	hĩãwã; hio̧w	hiɔ; hiyo	hiɔ̃	dihɔ	diəhã; diho̧; dihō	hɔwɔ̃	hɔ̃wɔ̃	hĩãwã; hĩɔwɔ; hi̧yowo
nose	go; migiyao	mi	mina; mini	mi̧ni; mĩni	mina	mɔkwã	mi	mɔdu	mudu	mini; mi̧ni; mĩnĩ
tooth	maeow; meyɔ	mɔɛ	mo̧i	moi; mɔi	mɔi	mẽ	mɔ̃yə̃; moyo; mɔyɔ	mei	mɛ̃	mɔ̃yə̃; moyo̧; mɔ̃yɔ̃
tongue	e; i	ilɪ	il(i); iri	ili	ili	i	i; iː	i	i	mȩnema̧ni; mẽnɛmãnĩ; meremai
leg	abogo; ɔbɔgɔ̃	hɔm	homo	hom; hɔm	hɔma	ɔbɔgɔ̃	obogo; ɔbɔgɔ	hɔmɔ	hɔmɔ̃	homo; hɔmɔ̃
louse	ou; ɔ̃u	ɔm	om	om	om	ɔ̃u	o̧u̧; oū	ɔu	õu	o̧u̧; õu; õw
dog	sɔ; sou	sɔf	sof; sɔf	sof; sɔf	sɔf	sɔ	so; sɔ	sɔ	sɔ	sɔfo; sofu; sɔfu
pig	wai	bɔɛ		bɔi	bɔi	wai	ʔo	bɛ	be	bɔyɔ
bird	siu; siyɔ	sikɪ	sigo	si	sigɔ	siɔ	siu; siyu	ɔsigɔ	sɔʔ	sigo; sigɔ
egg	sioho; siyɔ hɔ	si kɔlɔ	holo	hol; si hɔl	wigɔ hɔlɔ	siɔ hɔ	hoo; siu ho	sɔʔ hɔ	sɔʔ hɔ	holo; sigɔ hɔlɔ
blood	iyou; ɔyɔ	sʌh	so̧ho̧u	sahau	sõho	kafi	ayo	sãwɔ̃	kegãye	ayo; ayu
bone	dio; diɔ	kiːp	kib; kiːb; kibi	kib	kib	diɔ	dio; diu; diyo	ki	ki	kibi
skin	golo; kɔ̃fɔ̃ya	kɔrɔᵽ	kiari; sib	kolof; kɔlɔf	kɔlɔf	kɔlɔ	kolo; kɔlɔ; kɔrɔ	kulɔ	kɔlɔ	kolofu; kɔlɔfu; kɔrɔfu; sibi
breast	bu	tɔ̃ː	tol; tor	bu	tɔnu	bu	bu	tɔ̃	to	bu
tree	habe; hebẽ	hɔmɔlɔ	homu	homol; hɔmɔl	hɔmɔ̃n	hʌbe	home; hɔme	hɔmɔ	hɔmɔ	hɔmãnẽ; home
man	o; or	ɔs	os	os	os	ɔ	o	ɔľu	ɔlɔga	oso; ouson
woman	dobas̲ie; sʌbɔ sãi	uliɔ	uliya	uliʌ; uliya	uliʌ	sʌsai	sobo; sɔbɔ	subɔ	sɔbɔ	sobo; sɔbɔ
sun	aso; ʌsɔ̃	ɔ̃s	a̧s; ãs	o̧s; õːs	õs	ʌsɔ	ãsã; o̧so̧; ōsō	ɔsugɔ	osigɔ̃	ãsã; oso̧; ɔ̃sɔ̃
moon	ʌgwa; oguao	ɔgɔ	aib	ɔgwʌ; ogwa	ogɔ	ʌgwɔ	ogwʌ; ogwa	a	nɔ̃ligɔ	ogwʌ; ogwa
water	hoi; hwɔ̃e	hɔu	hãu; ho̧u̧	hãũ; ho̧u̧	hõ	hwẽi	hũi; hũĩ; hwi̧; hwī	hɔ̃wɔ̃	hɔ̃wɔ̃	hõ; ho̧u̧; hũ
fire	dou; dɔu	dɔlu	dau; dolu	dolu; dɔlu	dɔbu	dou	dou; dɔu; dow	dɔu	dɔu	dolo; dɔlɔ; dɔrɔ
stone	yaw; yɔu	yɔ	yo	yo	yo	yo	yo; yɔ	yɔ	yo	yo
road, path			ori				ai			ari
name	hũ; husolo		hũ	hu̧ti; hũti	hũni	hũ	hũ; hu̧ti; hũti		hũ	hũ; hu̧ti; hũti
eat	nale; nɔlu	nɔwal	na-	nowal; nɔwal	nɔwalaga	nɔlu	na; naiɔ; naiyo	nelaːbugɔ	nãye	na; na̧la; nãla
one	dano; sisãfe	helɛ	dob	helehai	hele	tano	tano; tanɔ	hɔmakɔna	dihɔ̃	helenu; helenũ
two	balo; sisãma	bena	behino̧w	bẽnabugu; bȩnabugu	bihinɔ̃n	bʌnɔu	beaũ; beya̧u̧	wɔlugu	hɔma kɔna	bȩnau; bẽnãu

== Evolution ==
Proposed East Strickland reflexes of proto-Trans-New Guinea (pTNG) etyma are:

Samo language:

- (da)subu ‘ashes’ < *sumbu
- si- ‘burn’ < *nj(a,e,i)-
- na- ‘eat’ < *na-
- magara ‘mouth’ < *maŋgat[a]
- korofu ‘skin’ < *(ŋg,k)a(n,t)apu
- mere(ma) ‘tongue’ < *me(l,n)e
- mini ‘nose’ < *mundu

Bibo language:

- (da)suf ‘ashes’ < *sumbu

Agala language:

- fulu(ma) ali ‘to fly’ < *pululu-
