= Soari River =

- Location in Papua New Guinea

Location
- Country: Papua New Guinea
- State: Western Province

Physical characteristics
- Mouth: Aramia River
  - coordinates: 7°54′59″S 142°28′19″E
  - elevation: 9 m

The Soari River is a river in Papua New Guinea. It is located in Western Province, in the southwest of the country, 500 km west of Port Moresby.

== See also ==
- Soari River languages
