= Kubo language =

Trans–New Guinea language

Kubo
- Region: New Guinea
- Native speakers: 500 (2007)
- Language family: Trans–New Guinea: East Strickland; Kubo

Language codes
- ISO 639-3: jko
- Glottolog: kubo1242

Kubo is a Trans–New Guinea language of New Guinea, spoken in the plains of the Strickland River.
