= Wiru language =

Language spoken in Papua New Guinea

Wiru
- Witu
- Native to: Papua New Guinea
- Region: Ialibu-Pangia District, Southern Highlands Province
- Ethnicity: Wiru
- Native speakers: (15,300 cited 1967, repeated 1981)
- Language family: Papuan Gulf ?: Teberan–Pawaian; Wiru
- Writing system: Latin

Language codes
- ISO 639-3: wiu
- Glottolog: wiru1244
- ELP: Wiru
- Map: The Wiru language of New Guinea The Wiru language Trans–New Guinea languages Other Papuan languages Austronesian languages Uninhabited

Wiru or Witu is the language spoken by the Wiru people of Ialibu-Pangia District of the Southern Highlands Province of Papua New Guinea. The language has been described by Harland Kerr, a missionary who lived in the Wiru community for many years. Kerr's work with the community produced a Wiru Bible translation and several unpublished dictionary manuscripts, as well as Kerr's Master's thesis on the structure of Wiru verbs.

There are a considerable number of resemblances with the Engan languages, suggesting Wiru might be a member of that family, but language contact has not been ruled out as the reason. Usher classifies it with the Teberan languages.

== Evolution ==
Wiru reflexes of proto-Trans-New Guinea (pTNG) etyma are:

- ibi(ni) ‘name’ < *imbi
- nomo ‘louse’ < *niman
- laga ‘ashes’ < *la(ŋg,k)a
- tokene ‘moon’ < *takVn[V]
- mane ‘instructions, incantations’ < *mana
- keda ‘heavy’ < *ke(nd,n)a
- mo- ‘negative prefix’ < *ma-

== Phonology ==
=== Consonants ===
		Labial	Alveolar	Retroflex	Palatal	Velar
Nasal		m	n			
Plosive	voiceless	p	t			k
Plosive	prenasal	ᵐb	ⁿd			ᵑɡ
Liquid			(ɾ)	ɭ		
Approximant		w			j	

- /p, t, k/ can be heard as aspirated [pʰ, tʰ, kʰ] in word-initial position and can also be heard with slight friction and voicing, in word-medial positions.
- /t/ can be heard as [d] when preceded by /i/ and followed by /a/ or /o/. It is heard as [ɾ] in all other intervocalic environments.

=== Vowels ===
	Front	Central	Back
Close	i		u
Mid	e		o
Open		a	

=== Stress ===
Content words in Wiru feature stress on the initial syllable. Stressed syllables are longer, while unstressed syllables feature vowel reduction and lenition of the onset consonant.

/kákà/ → [ˈkʰáːɣə̀] ('banana'), in which the phoneme /k/ is realized as an aspirated stop in the stressed syllable and as an unaspirated fricative in the unstressed syllable, and the phoneme /a/ is elongated in the stressed syllable and realized as a schwa in the unstressed syllable.

Because Wiru uses lexical and grammatical tone, stress is not marked through pitch changes.

== Pronouns ==
Trans–New Guinea–like pronouns are no 1sg (< *na) and ki-wi 2pl, ki-ta 2du (< *ki).

== Syntax ==
Wiru has a general noun-modifying clause construction. In this construction, a noun can be modified by a clause that immediately precedes it. The noun may, but need not, correspond to an argument of the modifying clause. Such constructions can be used to express a wide range of semantic relationships between clause and noun. The follow examples all use the same noun-modifying clause construction:

[No ka-k-u] tono tubea.
1SG stay-PRS-1SG mountain big
'The mountain I am on top of is big.'

[Kia-nea karo pi-k-i] ail-aroa eida piri-ki-ya.
be.red-INF car lie-PRS-2/3PL man-woman there lie-PRS-2/3PL-HAB
'The people who own red cars live there.'

[Kenbra namolo no-k-o] ko ou.
Canberra first come-PST-1PL story say.1SG.FUT
'I'll tell the story about the first time we came to Canberra.'

[Toro pea skul ke poa-rok-o] oi no-ka-l-e...
1PL all school LOC go-OPT-1PL time come-PST-DS-2/3PL...
'The time for all of us to go to school arrived...'

The noun-modifying clause construction imposes a falling tone on the head noun. That is, no matter what the lexical tone of the noun that is being modified is, it takes on a high-low tone pattern when it is modified in a noun-modifying clause construction.

== Vocabulary ==
The following basic vocabulary words are from Franklin (1973, 1975), as cited in the Trans-New Guinea database:

gloss	Wiru
head	tobou
hair	pine; píne
ear	kabidi
eye	lene
nose	timini
tooth	kime
tongue	keke; keké
leg	kawa
louse	nomo; nomò
dog	tue
pig	kaì
bird	ini; inì
egg	mu̧
blood	kamate
bone	tono
skin	kepene
breast	adu
tree	yomo; yomò
man	ali
woman	atoa; atòa
sun	lou; loú
moon	tokene
water	ue; uè
fire	toe
stone	kue; kué
name	ibini; ibíni
eat	nakò; one ne nako
one	odene
two	takuta; ta kutà
