= Chimbu River =

River in Papua New Guinea

Coordinates: 6°02′S 144°56′E

Location
- Country: Papua New Guinea
- Region: Chimbu Province

Physical characteristics
- Source
  - location: Papua New Guinea
- Mouth
  - location: Tua River

Chimbu River is a river in the Chimbu Province of Papua New Guinea. The Chimbu is a tributary of the Tua.
