= Soaru Range =

Mountain range in Papua New Guinea

- Location within Papua New Guinea

Highest point
- Elevation: 1,120 m (3,670 ft)

Geography
- State: Papua New Guinea
- Range coordinates: 6°30′S 144°20′E

Soaru Range also known as Sewori Range is a mountain range in the Southern Highlands Province in central part of Papua New Guinea, 500 km north-west of Port Moresby is the nation's capitol.

Populated places within range include Wembu.
