= Pogaya language =

Papuan language spoken in Papua New Guinea

Pogaya
- Bogaya
- Region: Papua New Guinea
- Native speakers: (300 cited 1981)
- Language family: Trans–New Guinea?: Duna–Pogaya?; Pogaya

Language codes
- ISO 639-3: boq
- Glottolog: boga1247
- ELP: Bogaya

Bogaya (Pogaya) is a Papuan language of Papua New Guinea. In Western Province, Bogaya is spoken in Olsobip Rural LLG and Nomad Rural LLG. It is also spoken in Koroba-Kopiago District, Hela Province.
