= Papuan Gulf languages =

Proposed language family of Papua New Guinea

Papuan Gulf
- (proposed)
- Geographic distribution: Papuan Gulf, southern Papua New Guinea
- Subdivisions: Kikorian; Strickland; Gogodala–Suki; Teberan–Pawaian

Language codes
- ISO 639-3: –
- Glottolog: None
- Map: The Papuan Gulf languages of New Guinea The Papuan Gulf languages Trans–New Guinea languages Other Papuan languages Austronesian languages Uninhabited

The Papuan Gulf languages are a proposed language family of Papuan languages spoken inland from the large gulf that defines the shape of southern Papua New Guinea.

== Languages ==
- Papuan Gulf
  - Kikorian (Kikori River)
    - Kutubuan
    - Turama–Kikorian
  - Strickland (Strickland and Soari River)
    - East Strickland
    - Doso–Turumsa
  - Gogodala–Suki (Suki–Aramia River)
  - Tua River
    - Teberan
    - Wiru
    - Pawaia
