= New Guinea singing dog =

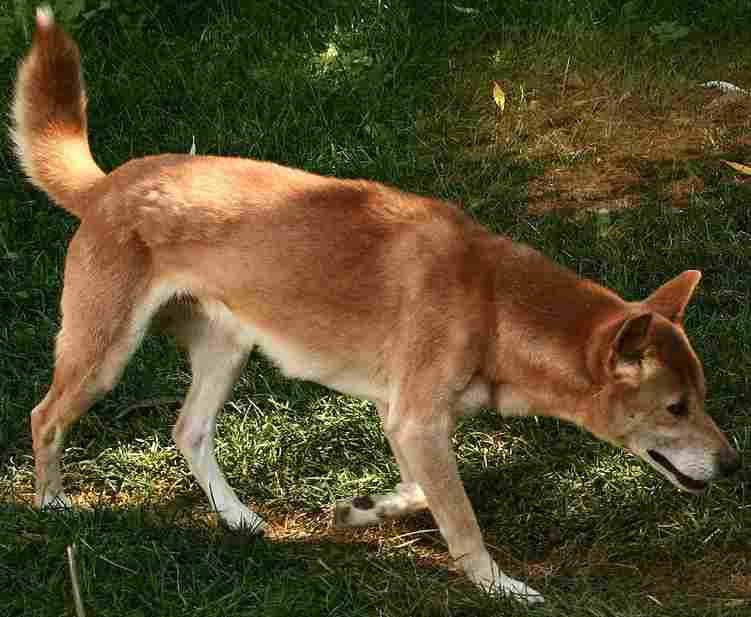
- Other names: New Guinea Highland dog, Hallstrom's dog
- Origin: New Guinea
Kennel club standards
- New Guinea Singing Dog Club of America: standard

The New Guinea singing dog or New Guinea Highland dog (Canis familiaris or Canis lupus dingo) is an ancient (basal) (Note: "The term basal taxon refers to a lineage that diverges early in the history of the group and lies on a branch that originates near the common ancestor of the group." – Reece (2015)) lineage of dog native to the New Guinea Highlands, on the island of New Guinea. Once considered to be a separate species in its own right, under the name Canis hallstromi, it is closely related to the Australian dingo. The dog is relatively unusual among canines; it is one of the few to be considered "barkless", and is known for the unusual "yodel" style of vocalizing that gives it its name.

In 1989, the Australian mammalogist Tim Flannery took a photo of a black-and-tan dog in Telefomin District. He noted that these dogs lived with local tribal peoples in the mountains, and that feral populations lived in the alpine and sub-alpine grasslands of the Star Mountains and the Wharton Range. The photo was published in his book, Mammals of New Guinea. In 2012, Australian wilderness-adventure guide Tom Hewett took a photo of a tawny, thick-coated dog in the Puncak Mandala region of West Papua, Indonesia. In 2016, a literature review found no definitive evidence that the earliest possible dogs, within captive populations of New Guinea singing dogs, were wild animals; successive generations of puppies were raised as members of village populations, thus being domestic dogs.

In 2020, a genetic study found that the New Guinea Highland wild dogs were genetically basal to the dingo and the New Guinea singing dog, and therefore the potential originator of both.

== Taxonomy ==
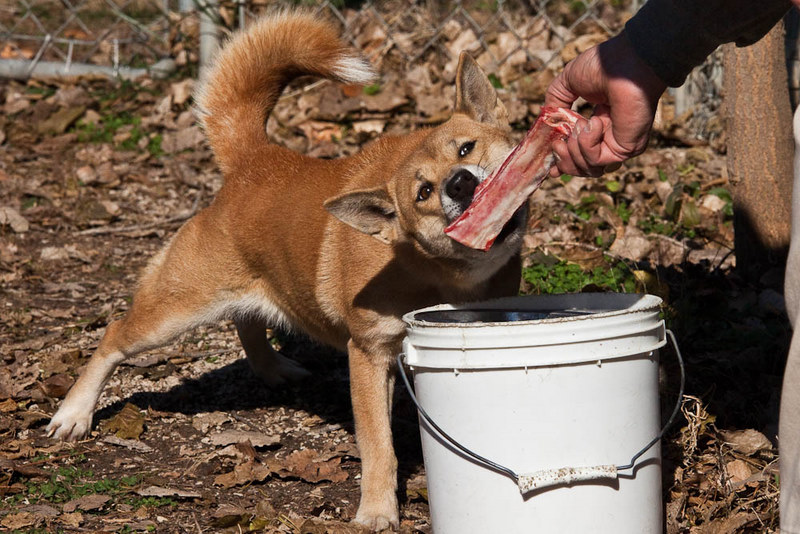
A New Guinea singing dog being offered a bone

In 1999, a study of mitochondrial DNA (mtDNA) indicated that the domestic dog may have originated from multiple grey wolf populations, with the dingo and New Guinea singing dog "breeds" having developed at a time when human populations were more isolated from each other. In the third edition of Mammal Species of the World published in 2005, the mammalogist W. Christopher Wozencraft listed under the wolf Canis lupus its wild subspecies, and proposed two additional subspecies: "familiaris Linnaeus, 1758 [domestic dog]" and "dingo Meyer, 1793 [domestic dog]". Wozencraft included hallstromi – the New Guinea singing dog – as a taxonomic synonym for the dingo. Wozencraft referred to the mtDNA study as one of the guides in forming his decision. The inclusion of familiaris and dingo under a "domestic dog" clade has been noted by other mammalogists. This classification by Wozencraft is debated among zoologists.

The New Guinea singing dog's taxonomic status is debated, with proposals that include treating it within the species concept (range of variation) of the domestic dog Canis familiaris, a distinct species Canis hallstromi, and Canis lupus dingo when considered a subspecies of the wolf. In 2019, a workshop hosted by the IUCN/SSC Canid Specialist Group considered the New Guinea singing dog and the dingo to be feral dogs Canis familiaris, and therefore should not be assessed for the IUCN Red List.

=== Taxonomic history ===
During the Torres expedition to the south coast of New Guinea and the Torres Strait in 1606, small dogs were recorded by Captain Don Diego de Prado y Tovar:

We found small dumb dogs that neither bark nor howl, and do not cry out even if beaten with sticks

On 26 October 1897, the Lieutenant-Governor of British New Guinea, Sir William MacGregor, was on Mount Scratchley, Central Province, Papua New Guinea. At an elevation of 7,000 ft (2,100 m) he recorded that "animals are rare," but listed "wild dog." MacGregor obtained the first specimen and later Charles Walter De Vis wrote a description of it in 1911. De Vis summarised from his description that:

... it is not a "truly a wild dog"; in other words that there was a time when its forebears were not wild. ... But if we decide that this dog is merely feral, of a domestic breed run wild, as dogs are apt to do, how are we to account for its habitat on Mount Scratchley?

In 1954, collectors for the Australian Museum observed these dogs around villages situated at 8,000 ft (2,400 m) on Mount Giluwe in the Southern Highlands Province. In 1956, Albert Speer and J. P. Sinclair obtained a pair of singing dogs in the Levani Valley that was situated in what is now Hela Province (formerly part of Southern Highlands Province). The two dogs had been obtained from natives. The dogs were sent to Sir Edward Hallstrom, who had set up a native animal study center in Nondugi, and from there to the Taronga Zoo in Sydney, Australia. In 1957, Ellis Troughton examined the two singing dog specimens from the Taronga Zoo and classified them as a distinct species Canis hallstromi in honour of Hallstrom.

=== Original description ===
Troughton described the type specimen as follows:

Specimens. – Male holotype, female allotype, in possession of Sir Edward Hallstrom at Taronga Zoological Park, Sydney, for eventual lodgment in the collection of the Australian Museum.

General characters:
Muzzle or rostral region short and narrow in contrast with the remarkable facial or bi-zygomatic width, imparting the strikingly vulpine or fox-like appearance. This comparison is sustained in the narrow body and very short bushy tail which measures little more than one third of the combined head-and-body length, with the width of the brush a fraction under 4 in (10 cm). The fleshy, softly furred, triangulate ears remain erect, though rounded and curved forward in conch-like fashion.

Colour (Ridgway (Note: "Ridgeway" refers to Robert Ridgway's colour nomenclature. See The color books in Robert Ridgway.)) of the head a clear tawny brown; the back a darker russet-brown owing to the admixture of blackish-brown hairs, the darker hairs enclosing a yellowish "saddlemark" somewhat more conspicuous in the female. Outer shoulders and hips clear ochraceous-tawny; tail about tawny-olive brindled above with blackish-brown, tip white; four paws whitish. Underparts a light buffy, a dark mark across the jaw separating the light chin-spot from the pale undersurface.

Dimensions of Holotype:
Head and body approximately 650 mm (26 in); tail exactly 245 mm (9.6 in), less brush; heel to longest toe, less nail, 145 mm (5.7 in); dew-claw from base to ground, 25 mm (0.98 in); ear, length from outer base to tip 75 mm (3.0 in), midwidth 40 mm (1.6 in); longest vibrissa 52 mm (2.0 in); length of head to extremity of sagittal crest 180 mm (7.1 in) (approx.) and bi-zygomatic width 100 mm (3.9 in); rear molar to incisor 90 mm (3.5 in); width across incisors 23 mm (0.91 in); height of upper canine 16 mm (0.63 in).

=== Lineage ===
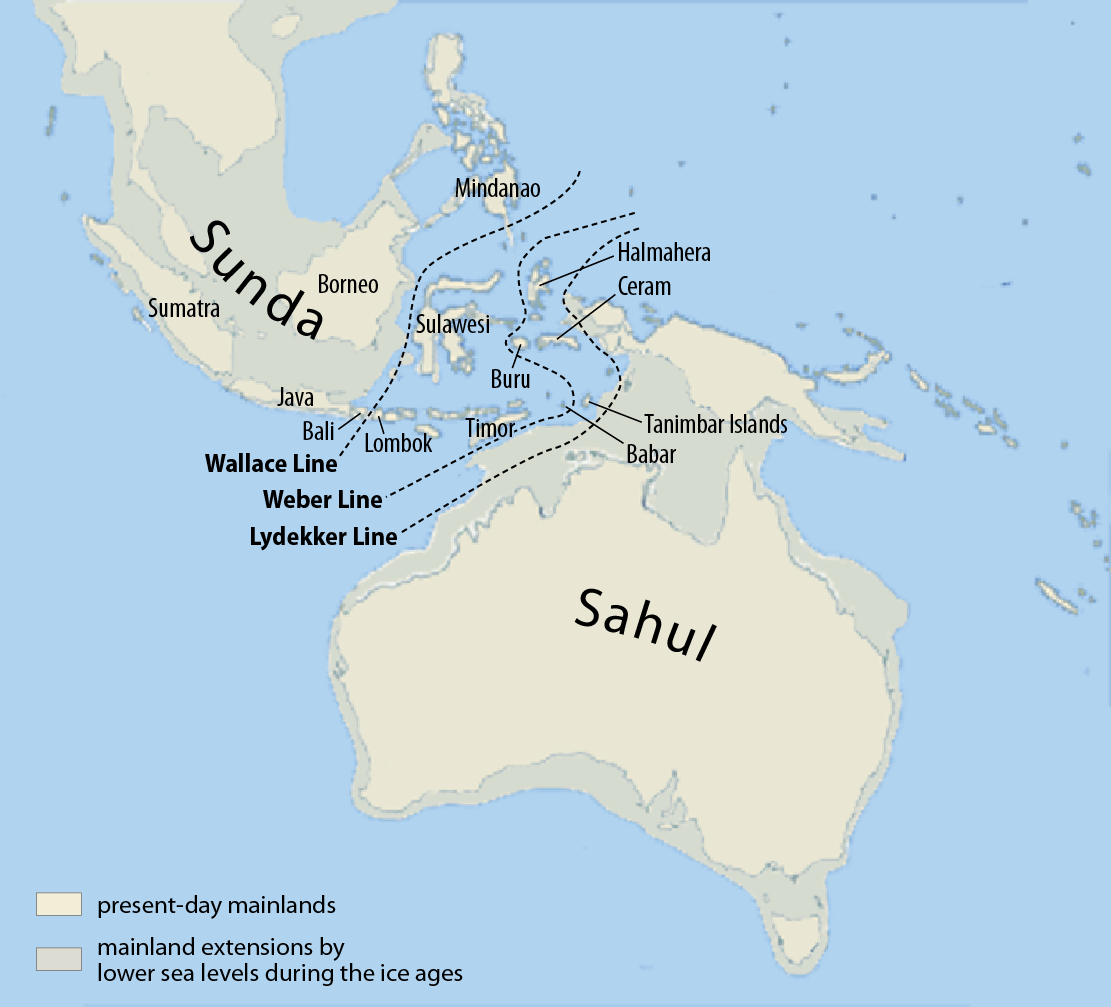
The Sahul Shelf and the Sunda Shelf during the past 12,000 years. Tasmania separated from the mainland 12,000 YBP, New Guinea separated from the mainland 6,500–8,500 YBP.

By the close of the last glacial period 11,700 years ago, five ancestral lineages had diversified from each other and were expressed in ancient dog samples found in the Levant (7,000 YBP), Karelia (10,900 YBP), Lake Baikal (7,000 YBP), ancient America (4,000 YBP), and in the New Guinea singing dog (present day).

Mitochondrial genome sequences indicates that the dingo falls within the domestic dog clade, and that the New Guinea singing dog is genetically closer to those dingoes that live in southeastern Australia than to those that live in the northwest. The dingo and New Guinea singing dog lineage can be traced back through the Malay Archipelago to Asia.

In 2016, a literature review found that:

there is no convincing evidence that New Guinea wild-living dogs and some, or all, pre-colonization New Guinea village dogs were distinct forms. Further, there is no definitive evidence that either high altitude wild-living dogs were formerly isolated from other New Guinea canids or that the animals that were the founding members of captive populations of New Guinea Singing Dogs were wild-living animals or the progeny of wild-living animals rather than being born and raised as members of village populations of domestic dogs. We conclude that:

(1) at the time of European colonization, wild dogs and most, if not all, village dogs of New Guinea comprised a single though heterogeneous gene pool
(2) eventual resolution of the phylogenetic relationships of New Guinea wild dogs will apply equally to all or most of the earliest New Guinea village-based, domesticated, dogs; and
(3) there remain places in New Guinea, such as Suabi and neighbouring communities, where the local village-based population of domestic dogs continues to be dominated by individuals whose genetic inheritance can be traced to pre-colonization canid forebears.

In 2020, the first whole genome analysis of the dingo and the New Guinea singing dog was undertaken. The study indicates that the ancestors of these two dogs arose in southern East Asia, migrated through Island Southeast Asia 9,900 YBP, and reached Australia 8,300 YBP. The study rejects earlier suggestions that these dogs arrived from southern Asia 4,300 YBP or as part of the Austronesian expansion into Island Southeast Asia, which arrived in New Guinea about 3,600 YBP. The genetic evidence is that dingoes arrived in Australia 8,300 YBP and brought by an unknown human population.

In 2024, a study found that the Dingo and New Guinea singing dog show 5.5% genome introgression from the ancestor of the recently extinct Japanese wolf, with Japanese dogs showing 4% genome introgression. This introgression occurred before the ancestor of the Japanese wolf arrived in Japan.

=== New Guinea Highland wild dog ===
In 2017, the New Guinea Highland Wild Dog Foundation (NGHWDF) announced to the media that in 2016, it and the University of Papua had located and photographed a group of 15 of what it referred to as "highland wild dogs." DNA analysis of scats indicate that these dogs have a genetic relationship with other dogs found in Oceania, including the dingo and the New Guinea singing dog.

In 2020, a nuclear genome study indicates that the highland wild dogs from the base of Puncak Jaya, within the Tembagapura district in the Mimika Regency of Papua, Indonesia, were the population from which captive New Guinea singing dogs were derived. The study revealed that the wild dogs show much more genetic diversity than the captive animals, which are severely inbred. This indicates the wild population is healthy. The size and distribution of the wild population is not known. Mitochondrial DNA indicates that the highland wild dogs possess the A29 haplotype, rather than the A79 haplotype which is found in the New Guinea singing dog. The A29 haplotype is found in dingoes, some New Guinea singing dogs, and some Asian, Arctic, and village dogs. A phylogenetic tree shows the highland wild dogs to be basal to the dingo and New Guinea singing dog, and therefore the potential originator of both.

These dogs live wild in a harsh and remote environment between 3,900–4,170 metres (12,800–13,680 ft) in elevation, which suggests they are a lineage of proto-dog that is related to the dingo and are not feral village dogs. This has led to some researchers to suggest that the taxon Canis dingo is appropriate for the only truly wild-living dog populations – the dingo, the New Guinea Highland wild dog, and the New Guinea singing dog.

== Description ==
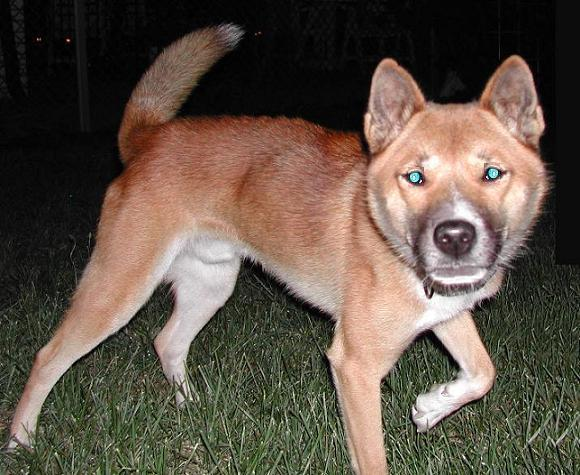
Night picture with noticeable green eye shine off the tapetum lucidum

Australian mammalogist Tim Flannery in his book the Mammals of New Guinea describes the "New Guinea Wild Dog" as looking similar to the dingo, only smaller. Most of these dogs in New Guinea are domesticated with large numbers being kept by widows and bachelors, with hunters keeping at least two for assisting them with hunting. These dogs do not bark, and their chorused howling makes a haunting and extraordinary sound, which has led to their alternative name of "New Guinea Singing Dog." Flannery published in his book a photo of a black-and-tan dog in the Telefomin District. He wrote that these dogs live with native people in the mountains, and that there were feral populations living in the alpine and sub-alpine grasslands of the Star Mountains and the Wharton Range.

Compared with other forms of dog, the New Guinea singing dog is described as relatively short-legged and broad-headed. These dogs have an average shoulder height of 31–46 cm (12–18 in) and weigh 9–14 kg (20–31 lb). They do not have rear dewclaws.

The limbs and spine of the New Guinea singing dog are very flexible and they can spread their legs sideways to 90°, comparable to the Norwegian Lundehund. They can also rotate their front and hind paws more than domestic dogs, which enables them to climb trees with thick bark or branches that can be reached from the ground; however, their climbing skills do not reach the same level as those of the gray fox, and are similar to those of a cat.

The eyes, which are highly reflective, are triangular (or almond-shaped) and are angled upwards from the inner to outer corners with dark eye rims. Eye color ranges from dark amber to dark brown. Their eyes exhibit a bright green glow when lights are shone on them in low light conditions. There are two features which researchers believe allow New Guinea singing dogs to see more clearly in low light. One is that of their pupils, which open wider and allow in more light than in other dog varieties. The other is that they possess a higher concentration of cells in the tapetum.

New Guinea singing dogs have erect, pointed, fur-lined ears. As with other wild dogs, the ears 'perk,' or lay forward, which is suspected to be an important survival feature for the form. The ears can be rotated like a directional receiver to pick up faint sounds. Their tails are bushy, long enough to reach the hock, free of kinks, and have a white tip.

Pups are born with a dark chocolate brown pelt with gold flecks and reddish tinges, which changes to light brown by the age of six weeks. Adult coloration occurs around four months of age. For adult dogs, the colors brown, black, and tan have been reported, all with white points. The sides of the neck and zonal stripes behind the scapula are golden. Black and very dark guard hair is generally lightly allocated over the hair of the spine, concentrating on the back of the ears and the surface of the tail over the white tip. The muzzle is always black on young dogs. Generally, all colors have white markings underneath the chin, on the paws, chest and tail tip. About one third also have white markings on the muzzle, face and neck. By 7 years of age, the black muzzle begins to turn grey.

== Behaviour ==
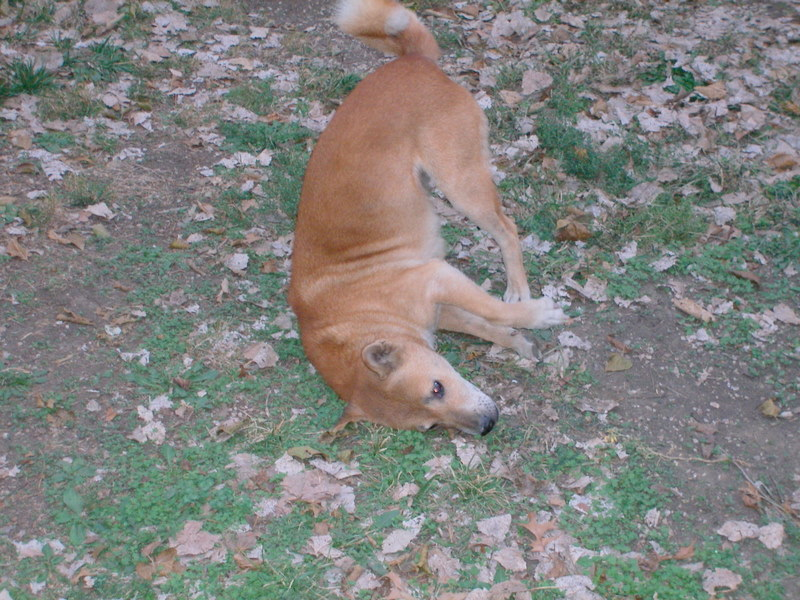
New Guinea singing dog rolling

All sightings in the wild were of single dogs or pairs, therefore it can be inferred that wild New Guinea singing dogs do not form permanent packs. Tim Flannery's short 1989 report on dogs in the mountains of Papua New Guinea described them as "extraordinarily shy" and "almost preternaturally canny." According to Robert Bino (1996), (Note: Robert Bino is a student from the University of Papua New Guinea.) these dogs only use their resting places under roots and ledges in New Guinea sporadically. Bino conjectured that these dogs are highly mobile and forage alone and concluded that they therefore might use several hiding places in their home range.

During research observations, the examined dogs generally showed a lower threshold of behaviour (e.g., scent rolling) than other domestic dogs, as well as an earlier developmental onset than other domestic dogs or grey wolves (e.g., hackle biting at two weeks compared to other domestic dogs/grey wolves at 6 weeks) and a quantitative difference (e.g., reduced expression of intraspecific affiliate behaviours). The dogs observed did not show the typical canid play bow; however, Imke Voth found this behaviour during examinations in the 1980s.

Several behaviours unique to New Guinea singing dogs have been noted:

Head toss
This behaviour, shown by every observed dog, is a prompt for attention, food or a sign of frustration, expressed in varying degrees depending on the level of arousal. In the complete expression, the head is swept to one side, nose rotated through a 90° arc to midline, then rapidly returned to the starting position. The entire sequence takes one to two seconds. The mildest expression is a slight flick of the head to the side and back. During this behaviour, the characteristic contrasting black and white chin markings are displayed.
Copulatory scream
At the copulatory tie, the female emits a repetitive sequence of loud, high-pitched yelps lasting about three minutes. This scream has a strong arousal effect on most domestic dogs.
Copulatory contractions
About three minutes after the start of the tie, females begin a series of rhythmic abdominal contractions. During each contraction, the skin of the flanks and lumbar area is drawn forward. These contractions are accompanied by groans and occur regularly, several seconds apart (they may pause intermittently), continuing for the length of the tie.

Additionally, New Guinea singing dogs have an unusual form of auto-erotic stimulation, which includes a strong tendency to target the genitals for both playful and aggressive bites, a cheek-rub that may be a marking behaviour and a tooth-gnashing threat.

During estrus, when potential partners are present, same-sex New Guinea singing dogs often fight to the point of severe injury. Furthermore, adults also display a high degree of aggression towards unfamiliar dogs, which would indicate that they are strongly territorial. Their distinctive aggression could not be observed to that extent among Australian dingoes (who live without human contact).

Researchers have noted rough play behaviour by the mothers towards their pups, which often switched over to agonistic behaviour as well as "handling." The mothers did not adequately react to the pups' shouts of pain but rather interpreted it as further "invitation" for "playing." The researchers stated that this behaviour was noted in their subjects only and does not necessarily apply to all singing dogs.

=== Vocalizations ===
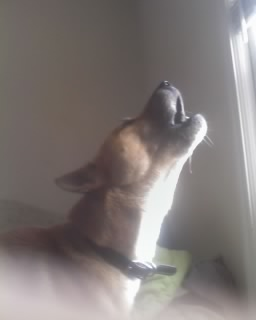
New Guinea singing dogs have a distinctive "song"

New Guinea Singing Dogs vocalizations
A pair of New Guinea singing dogs vocalizing.

New Guinea singing dogs are named for their distinctive and melodious howl, which is characterized by a sharp increase in pitch at the start and very high frequencies at the end. The howling of these dogs can be clearly differentiated from that of Australian dingoes, and differs significantly from that of grey wolves and coyotes.

An individual howl lasts an average of 3 seconds, but can last as long as 5 seconds. At the start, the frequency rises and stabilizes for the rest of the howling, but normally shows abrupt changes in frequency. Modulations can change quickly every 300–500 milliseconds or every second. Five to eight overtones can generally be distinguished in a spectrographic analysis of the howling.

New Guinea singing dogs sometimes howl together, which is commonly referred to as chorus howling. During chorus howling, one dog starts and others join in shortly afterward. In most cases, chorus howling is well synchronized, and the howls of the group end nearly simultaneously. Spontaneous howling is most common during the morning and evening hours. A trill, with a distinctly "bird-like" character, is emitted during high arousal. It is a high-frequency pulsed signal whose spectral appearance suggests a continuous source that is periodically interrupted, and might last as long as 800 milliseconds. Such a sound is not known for any other canid; however, a similar sound (with lower frequency) has been described for a dhole at the Moscow Zoo. When they are kept with dogs that bark, New Guinea singing dogs may mimic the other dogs.

=== Reproduction ===
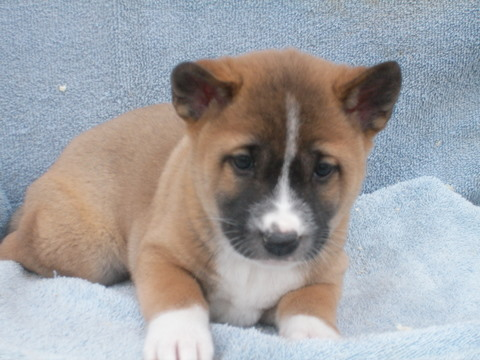
New Guinea singing dog puppy

The New Guinea singing dog possesses an annual seasonality, and if not impregnated will have a second estrus within a few weeks after the end of the first. Sometimes they will have a third. Males in captivity often participate in raising the pups, including the regurgitation of food. Female New Guinea singing dogs are protective of their young and will aggressively attack their male counterpart if they suspect he poses a danger to the pups. During the first breeding season following their birth, especially if there is a potential mate present, pups are often aggressively attacked by the same-sex parent.

=== Diet ===
Reports from local sources in Papua New Guinea from the 1970s and the mid-1990s indicate that New Guinea singing dogs—like wild dogs found in New Guinea, whether they were pure New Guinea singing dogs or hybrids—fed on small to middle-sized marsupials, rodents, birds, and fruits. Robert Bino stated that their prey consisted of cuscuses, wallabies, and possibly dwarf cassowaries. New Guinea singing dogs in captivity do not require a specialized diet, but they seem to thrive on lean raw meat diets based on poultry, beef, elk, deer, or bison.

Natives interviewed in the highlands state that these dogs steal the kills of Papuan eagles.

== Status and distribution ==
Since 1956, New Guinea singing dogs have been obtained or sighted in the wild chiefly in mountainous terrain around the central segment of the New Guinea Highlands, a major island-extensive east–west running mountain range formation. The 1956 dogs obtained by Papua New Guinea District Officer J.P. Sinclair and his medical assistant Albert Speer (see 'Taxonomic history' section above) were obtained from the Levani Valley, located in what is now North Koroba Rural LLG, Hela Province, Papua New Guinea, and were sent to Taronga Zoo in Sydney, Australia. In 1976, the German explorer Wolfgang Nelke captured five dogs in the Eipomek River Valley and sent them to Germany. Today, the captive population in the United States descends from individuals obtained from Taronga Zoo. There are also captive dog populations in Germany, Canada, and the United Kingdom.

Reports of the Kalam people capturing New Guinea singing dogs in the mid-1970s imply the human tribe's range just off center east on the northeastern mainland coast (see 'Relationship with humans' section below). A 2007 sighting in the Kaijende Highlands was east of the center. The 2012 sighting was near Puncak Mandala slightly to the west, all in the highlands around the range's spine.

The reported habitat of the New Guinea singing dog consists of mountains and swampy mountain regions of Papua New Guinea at an altitude of 2,500 to 4,700 meters. The main vegetation zones are the mixed forest, beech and mossy forest, sub-alpine coniferous forest and alpine grassland. Based on archaeological, ethnographic, and circumstantial evidence, it can be assumed that New Guinea singing dogs were once distributed over the whole of New Guinea and later restricted to the upper mountains. Since there have been no verified sightings of these dogs in Papua New Guinea since the 1970s until an August 2012 photograph in the wild, these dogs are now apparently rare.

There were reports of New Guinea singing dogs in the Star Mountains until 1976, and in the mid-1970s reports of capture and training, but not breeding by the Kalam people (see § Relationship with humans).

In his 1998 book Throwim Way Leg, Tim Flannery states that the dokfuma (which he describes as sub-alpine grassland with the ground being sodden moss, lichens and herbs growing atop a swamp) at 3,200 meters elevation had plenty of New Guinea singing dogs, which could usually be heard at the beginning and end of each day. When alone in his campsite one day, a group of canines came within several hundred meters of him. Flannery apparently did not have his camera along or ready, since he reported no pictures taken.

In 1996 Robert Bino undertook a field study of these dogs, but was not able to observe any wild New Guinea singing dogs and instead used signs, such as scats, paw prints, urine markings and prey remnants, to make conclusions about their behaviour. No DNA sampling was conducted. There have been reports from local residents that wild dogs have been seen or heard in higher reaches of the mountains.

In a 2007 report, a more recent sighting was the fleeting glimpse of a dog at Lake Tawa in the Kaijende Highlands. Local assistants assured the researchers that the dogs at Lake Tawa were wild-living dogs, since there were no villages near that location. It needs to be made clear, however, that "wild-living" does not necessarily mean that canines observed by natives are New Guinea singing dogs. It is possible that they are simply feral domestic dogs or New Guinea singing dog hybrids.

On 24 August 2012, the second known photograph of a New Guinea singing dog in the wild was taken by Tom Hewitt, Director of Adventure Alternative Borneo, in the Jayawijaya Mountains or Star Mountains of Papua Province, Indonesia, Western New Guinea by a trek party returning from Puncak Mandala, at approximately 4,760 m high the highest peak in the Jayawijaya range and second highest freestanding mountain of Oceania, Australasia, New Guinea and Indonesia (though Hewitt himself seems to erroneously say this peak is in the Star Mountains, which are adjacent to the Jayawijaya range, and also casually calls the region 'West Papua' rather than Indonesia's Papua Province in the Western geopolitical 'half' of the New Guinea landmasses, while his identification of the peak is quite clear, including its estimated elevation which is distinctive among New Guinea's peaks). In a valley flanked by waterfalls on both sides among approximately 4 km (13,000 ft) high limestone peaks, replete with such flora and fauna as cycads, grasses and blooms of the highlands, cuscuses, possums, tree kangaroos, unidentified ground-nesting birds in swamp grass, and a bird-of-paradise species heard but not seen, Hewitt relates that his veteran trek guide called out "dog" four times and pointed to fetch Hewitt and his trek client from their explorations behind large boulders and have them realize that ahead and above the guide and camp cook on a rocky outcrop was a dog, in Hewitt's words "not scared, but...genuinely curious...as we were of it, and it certainly felt like a rare meeting for both sides. The guides and cook were also surprised". While the guide had at first approached "quite close", the dog retreated as the party came toward it, though it stayed on the hillside while being photographed for a mutual observation session of about 15 minutes. Hewitt only became fully aware of the importance of his party's sighting and photograph of this dog when he contacted Tom Wendt, New Guinea Singing Dog International (NGSDI)'s founder upon returning home, then regretting that he did not videorecord the encounter. Hewitt and Wendt observe that West Papuan locals report that sightings are rare, and that New Guinea singing dogs have not been domesticated by current human inhabitants of their area.

In 2016, a literature review found that "there is no definitive evidence that...the founding members of captive populations of New Guinea Singing Dogs were wild-living animals or the progeny of wild-living animals rather than being born and raised as members of village populations of domestic dogs." In the same year, the New Guinea Highland Wild Dog Foundation announced to the media that it and the University of Papua had located and photographed a group of 15 of what it referred to as "highland wild dogs". DNA analysis of scats indicate that these dogs have a genetic relationship with other dogs found in Oceania, including the dingo and the New Guinea singing dog.

== Relationship with humans ==
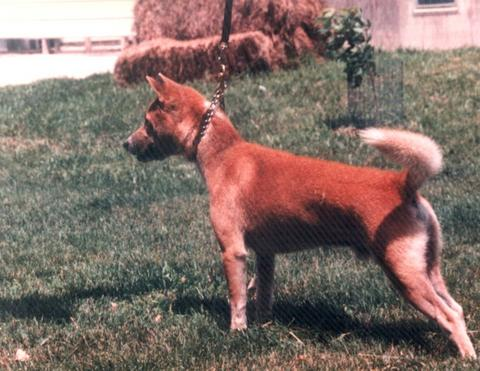
Singing dog being trained for rare breed show competition.

According to reports from the late 1950s and mid-1970s, wild dogs believed to be New Guinea singing dogs were shy and avoided contact with humans. It was reported in the mid-1970s that the Kalam in the highlands of Papua caught young New Guinea singing dogs and raised them as hunting aids, but did not breed them. Some of these dogs probably stayed with the Kalam and reproduced. The Eipo tribe kept and bred wild dogs as playmates for their children. Although the majority of the highland tribes never used village dogs as a food source, it is known that even today they attempt to catch, kill and eat wild dogs. Tribes such as the Malakomofip Villagers hunt them for trophy hunting, and they are revered alongside wild pigs and cassowaries as a challenging quarry.

Dog-findings in archaeological sites of New Guinea are rare, mostly consisting of teeth (used as ornaments) and trophy-skulls. Since the beginning of the 20th century, the inhabitants of the highlands started to keep chickens, and New Guinea singing dogs had a penchant for poultry. To add to the problem, natives kept other domestic dogs. The crossbred dogs were generally larger in size, as well as less of a challenge to train, so they tended to be of more value than New Guinea singing dogs. One might conclude that the relationship between the contemporary New Guineans and their dogs will give information about how they treated the New Guinea singing dogs, but modern "village dogs" are not genetically representative of pure New Guinea singing dogs.

A study published in 2021 surveyed owners of New Guinea singing dogs living in North America as companion animals. The study found that New Guinea singing dogs behave like other ancient/primitive domestic dog breeds, and demonstrated less aggression than many of the breeds included in the study. They were also found to be similarly trainable to Basenjis and Canaan Dogs. Owners reported that owning a singing dog is similar to owning a Shiba Inu or Akita. Owners of New Guinea singing dogs also reported participating in dog sports and working as therapy and service dogs.

== Conservation and preservation ==
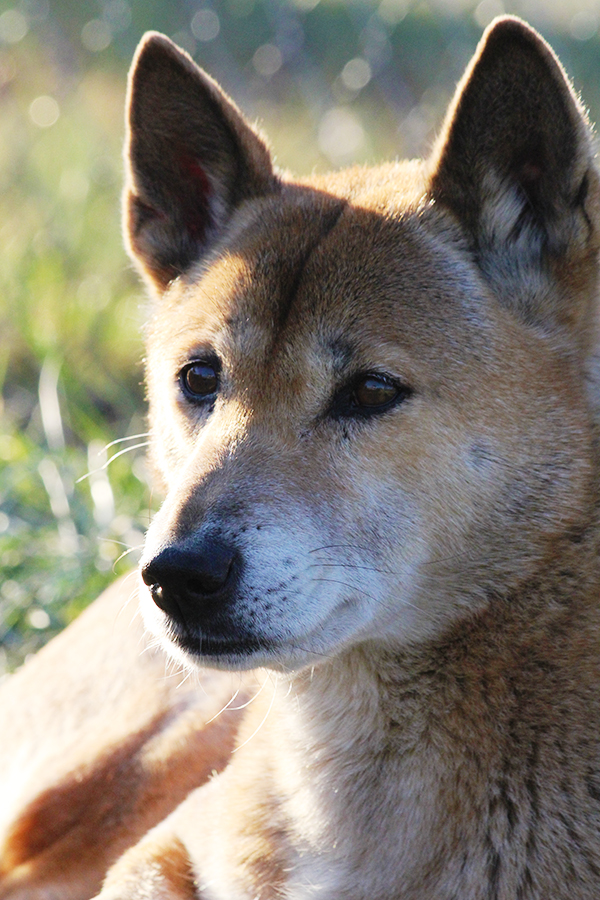
A New Guinea singing dog at the Conservators Center in North Carolina.

In the past, the New Guinea singing dog was considered "unworthy" of scientific study, as it was regarded as an insignificant variety of feral domestic dog. However, due to its potential value as a resource for the determination of the process of domestication, particularly in relation to the dingo, as well as several of its unique genetic, behavioural, ecological, reproductive and morphological characteristics, limited research has been undertaken. The New Guinea Department of Environment and Conservation has announced protection measures.

Hybridization is one of the most serious threats facing the New Guinea singing dog. New Guinea singing dogs are handicapped, as are many canids such as the Australian dingo, by their susceptibility to being bred by canines other than those of their own kind. This vulnerability has, and is still, causing a "watering down" of dingo genes needed to maintain purity.

There are two organizations formed for conserving and preserving New Guinea singing dogs. They are the New Guinea Singing Dog Conservation Society, founded in 1997, and New Guinea Singing Dog Club of America, a national breed club, rescue, and pet education group. Both of these organizations are based in the United States.

== See also ==
- List of canids
- List of dog breeds
- Domesticated plants and animals of Austronesia

== Bibliography ==
- Smith, Bradley, ed. (2015). The Dingo Debate: Origins, Behaviour and Conservation. CSIRO Publishing, Melbourne, Australia. ISBN 9781486300303.
