= Long-bearded honeyeater =

Conservation status
- Vulnerable (IUCN 3.1)

Scientific classification
- Kingdom: Animalia
- Phylum: Chordata
- Class: Aves
- Order: Passeriformes
- Family: Meliphagidae
- Genus: Melionyx
- Species: M. princeps

Binomial name
- Melionyx princeps (Mayr & Gilliard, 1951)

Synonyms
- Melidectes princeps

Species of bird

The long-bearded honeyeater (Melionyx princeps), is a bird in the honeyeater family Meliphagidae.

This species was formerly placed in the genus Melidectes. It was moved to the resurrected genus Melionyx based on the results of a molecular phylogenetic study published in 2019. At the same time the common name was changed from "long-bearded melidectes" to "long-bearded honeyeater".

== Description ==
The long-bearded honeyeater is 27 cm long. It has a long, slender black bill and orange skin behind its eye. Its plumage is soot-black. It is distinguished from the similar sooty honeyeaters by its wispy white beard, which reaches the bend of its wing.

== Distribution and habitat ==
The honeyeater is endemic to Papua New Guinea, and is found only on Mt Giluwe, Mt Hagen, the Kubor Range, Mt Wilhelm, Mt Michael and in the Kaijende Highlands of Enga Province, 70 km NW of Mt Hagen. Its range is about 19,000 km^{2}. It lives at high altitudes in shrubland, grassland or moist forest.

== Behaviour ==
The honeyeaters inhabit the tree canopies, eating nectar, fruit and insects. They feed in pairs or small groups. They nest in June and July. The voice is unrecorded.

== Threats and conservation ==
The honeyeater is classified as vulnerable on the IUCN Red List. Where once it was thought that it was threatened by habitat loss, it is now believed that its ability to live on edges of fragmented land may mean that it is less at risk. Climate change remains a potential threat. It was estimated in 2000 that there were fewer than 10,000 mature individuals remaining. No conservation measures are in place; however, there is a proposal to undertake a survey of forest blocks at suitable altitudes.

== Sources ==
- Mayr & Gillard. (1951)
- BirdLife International (2010) Species factsheet: Melidectes princeps
- Sibley and Monroe (1990, 1993)
