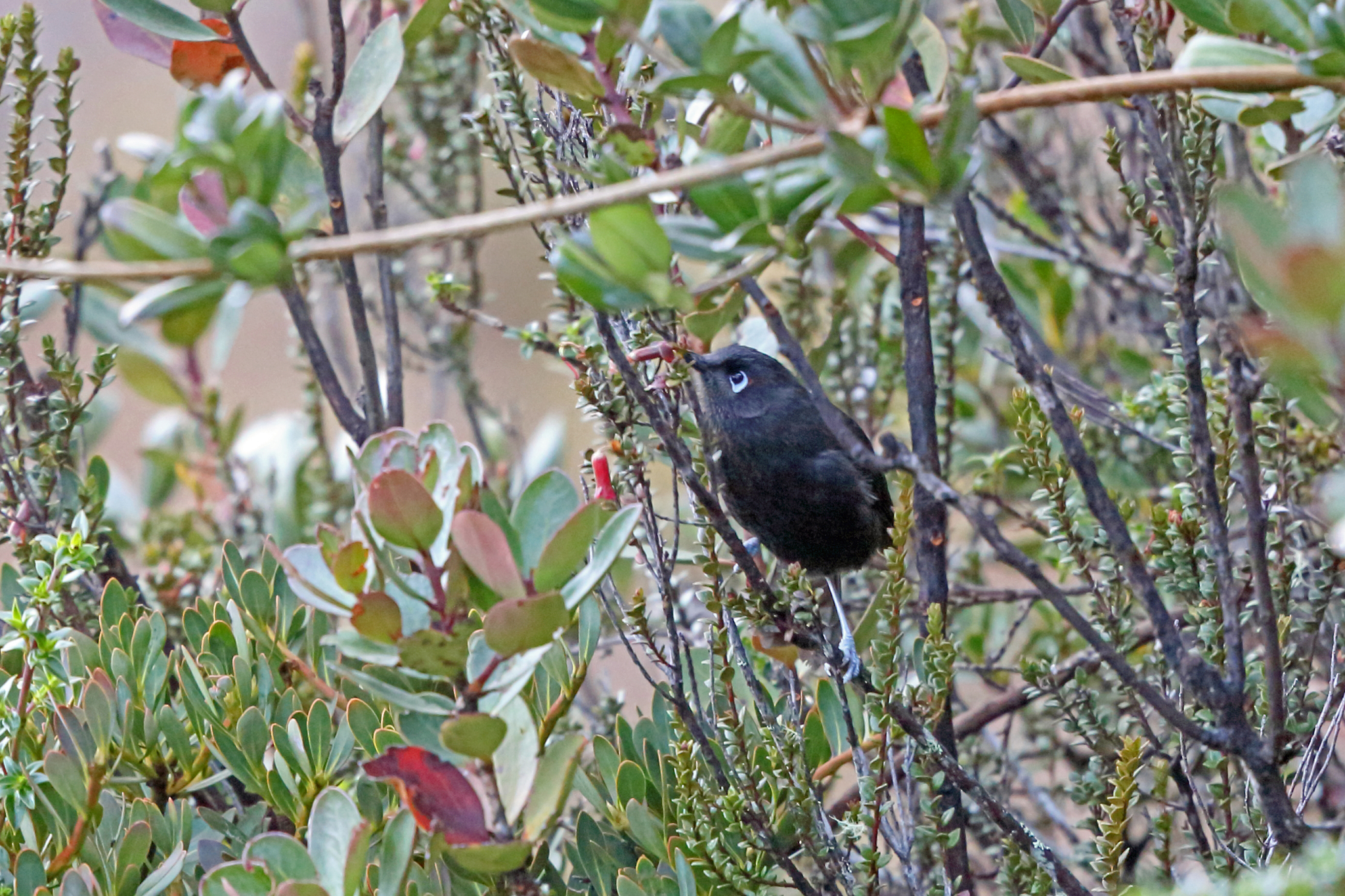

Conservation status
- Least Concern (IUCN 3.1)

Scientific classification
- Kingdom: Animalia
- Phylum: Chordata
- Class: Aves
- Order: Passeriformes
- Family: Meliphagidae
- Genus: Melionyx
- Species: M. fuscus

Binomial name
- Melionyx fuscus (De Vis, 1897)

Synonyms
- Melidectes fuscus

= Sooty honeyeater =

Species of bird

The sooty honeyeater (Melionyx fuscus) is a species of bird in the family Meliphagidae. It is found in the New Guinea Highlands. Its natural habitat is subtropical or tropical moist montane forest.

This species was formerly placed in the genus Melidectes. It was moved to the resurrected genus Melionyx based on the results of a molecular phylogenetic study published in 2019. At the same time the common name was changed from "sooty melidectes" to "sooty honeyeater".
