= Goilala =

Goilala refers to:

- Goilala District in Central Province, Papua New Guinea
- Goilalan languages, a group of languages in the Trans–New Guinea family
