= Kunimaipan languages =

Language family

Kunimaipan
- Geographic distribution: Papua New Guinea

Language codes
- Glottolog: kuni1270 Kunimaipan

The Kunimaipan languages are a small language family spoken in Papua New Guinea. They are a subclass of the Goilalan languages.

The attested languages are:

- Kunimaipa
- Tauade
- Weri / Amam
- Biangai
