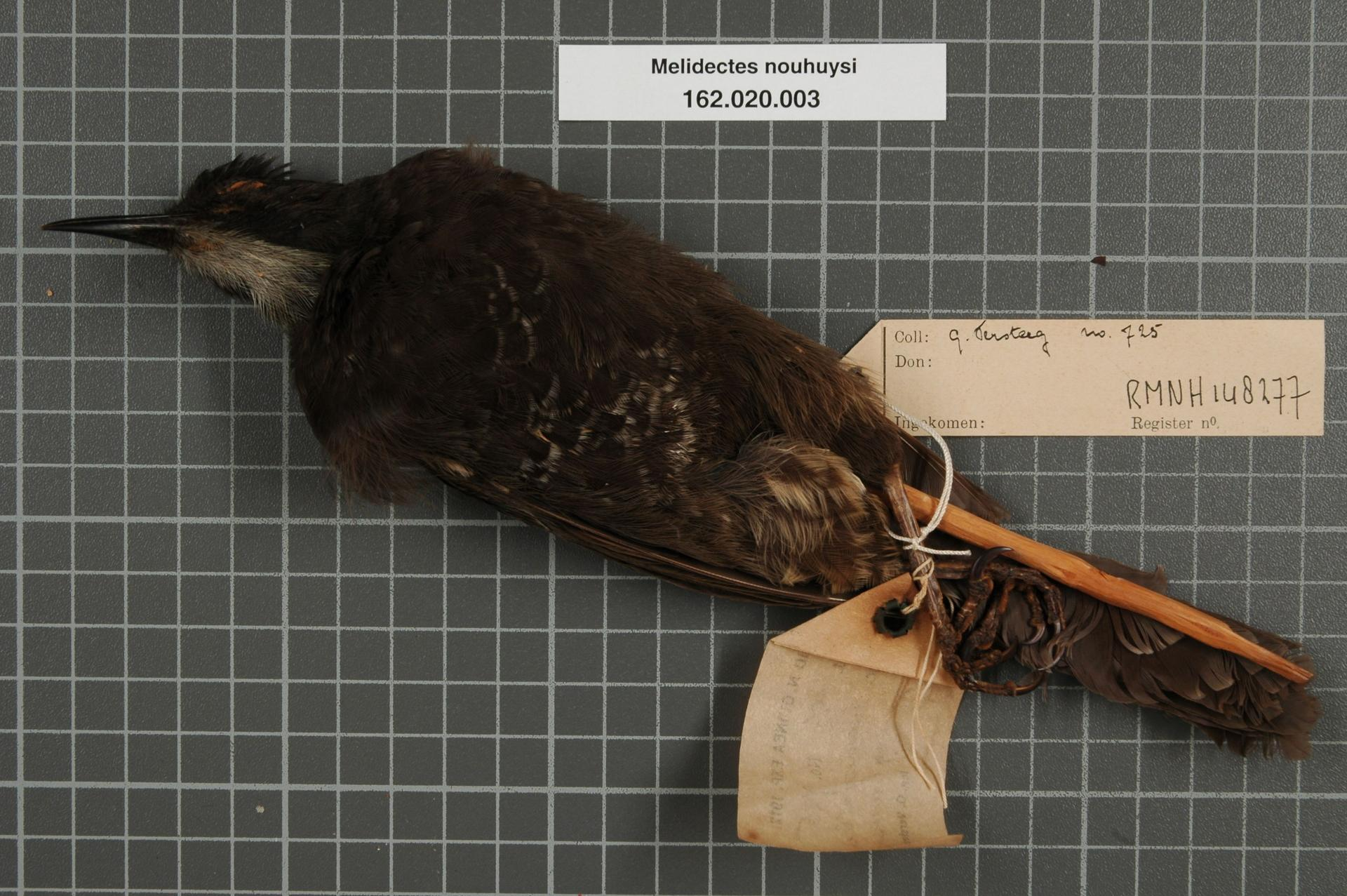
- Melionyx nouhuysi

Scientific classification
- Kingdom: Animalia
- Phylum: Chordata
- Class: Aves
- Order: Passeriformes
- Family: Meliphagidae
- Genus: Melionyx; Iredale, 1956

= Melionyx =

Genus of birds

Melionyx is a genus of bird in the family Meliphagidae.

These species were formerly placed in the genus Melidectes. They were moved to the resurrected genus Melionyx based on the results of a molecular phylogenetic study published in 2019. At the same time, the common names were changed from "melidectes" to "honeyeater".

The genus contains three species:

| Image | Name | Common name |
|---|---|---|
| | Melionyx fuscus | Sooty honeyeater |
| | Melionyx nouhuysi | Short-bearded honeyeater |
| | Melionyx princeps | Long-bearded honeyeater |
