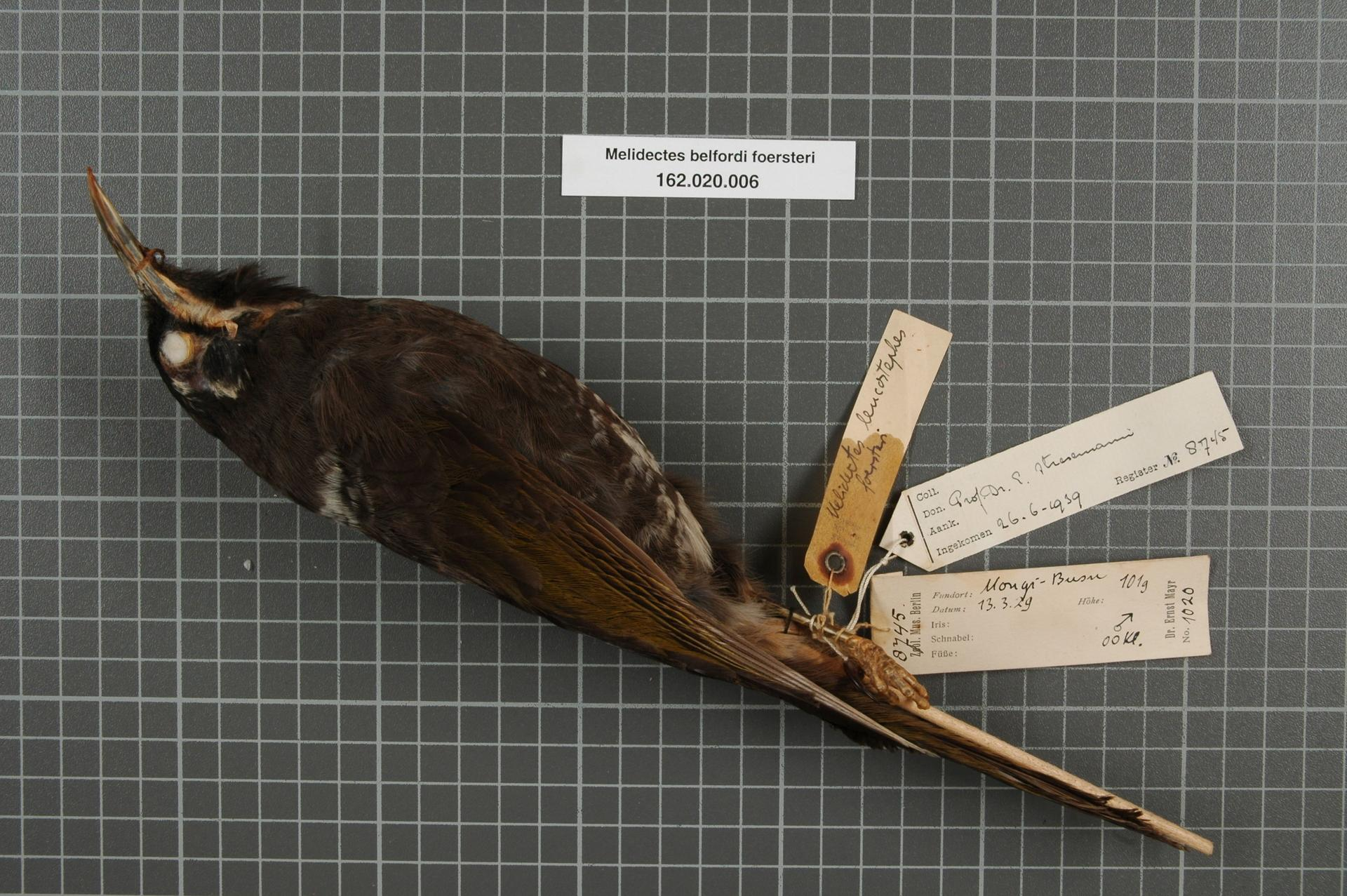

Conservation status
- Least Concern (IUCN 3.1)

Scientific classification
- Kingdom: Animalia
- Phylum: Chordata
- Class: Aves
- Order: Passeriformes
- Family: Meliphagidae
- Genus: Melidectes
- Species: M. foersteri

Binomial name
- Melidectes foersteri (Rothschild & Hartert, 1911)

= Huon melidectes =

Species of bird

The Huon melidectes or Huon honeyeater (Melidectes foersteri) is a species of bird in the family Meliphagidae. It is endemic to Papua New Guinea. Its natural habitat is subtropical or tropical moist montane forest.
