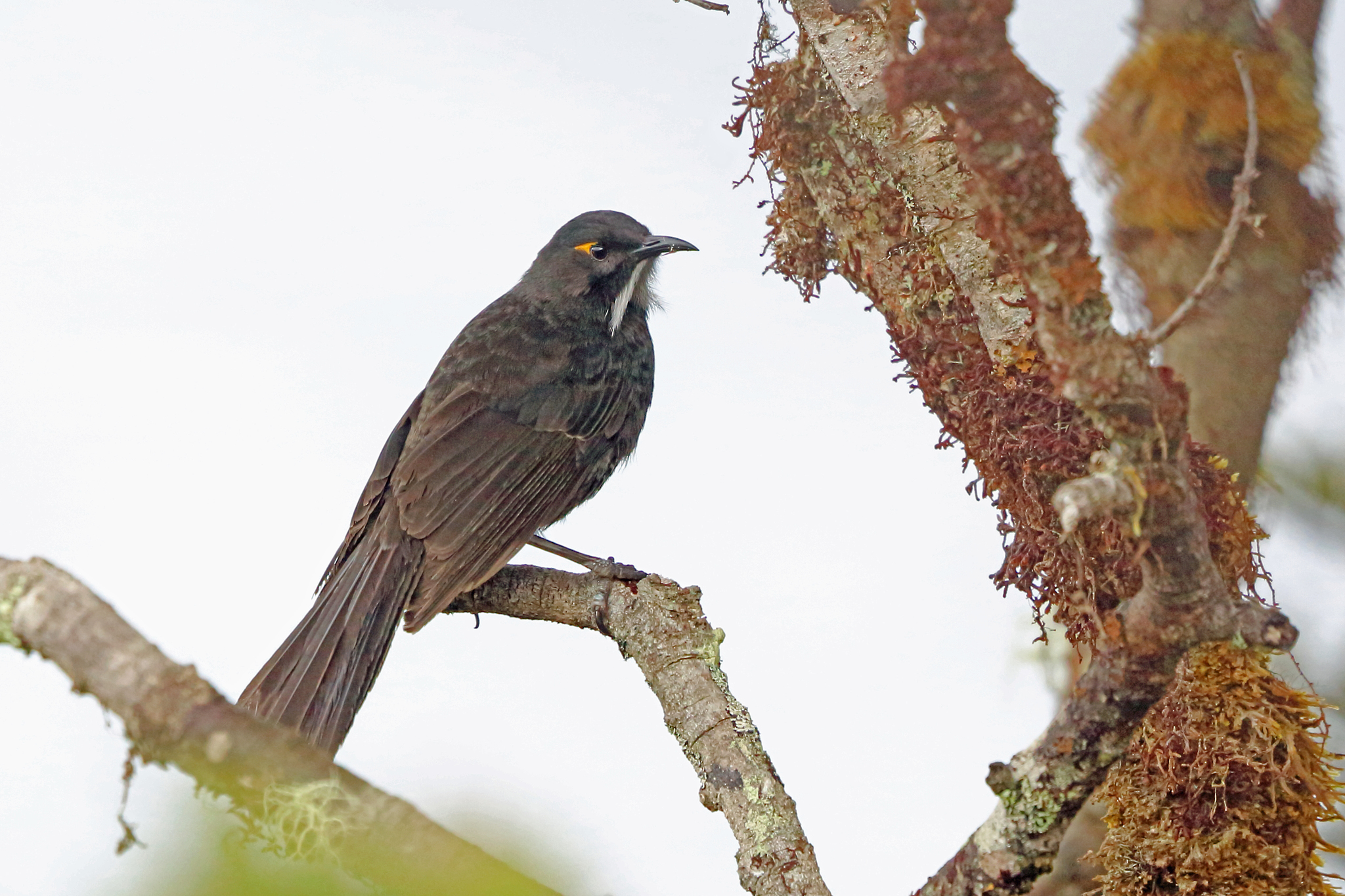

Conservation status
- Least Concern (IUCN 3.1)

Scientific classification
- Kingdom: Animalia
- Phylum: Chordata
- Class: Aves
- Order: Passeriformes
- Family: Meliphagidae
- Genus: Melionyx
- Species: M. nouhuysi

Binomial name
- Melionyx nouhuysi (van Oort, 1910)

Synonyms
- Melidectes nouhuysi

= Short-bearded honeyeater =

Species of bird

The short-bearded honeyeater (Melionyx nouhuysi) is a species of bird in the honeyeater family Meliphagidae. It is found mainly in West Papua. Its natural habitat is subtropical or tropical moist montane forests.

This species was formerly placed in the genus Melidectes. It was moved to the resurrected genus Melionyx based on the results of a molecular phylogenetic study published in 2019. At the same time the common name was changed from "short-bearded melidectes" to "short-bearded honeyeater".
