= Fuyug language =

Goilalan language spoken in Papua New Guinea

Fuyug
- Region: Papua New Guinea
- Native speakers: 14,000 (2003)
- Language family: Trans-New Guinea?: Goilalan; Fuyug

Language codes
- ISO 639-3: fuy
- Glottolog: fuyu1242

Fuyug (Fuyuge, Fuyughe, Mafulu) is a language of Papua New Guinea spoken in the Central Province of the country. The language's 14,000 speakers live in 300 villages in the Goilala District.

== Phonology ==
The usual orthographic convention used to transcribe Fuyug is to use a for /ɑ/, e for /ɛ/, y for /j/, and the corresponding IPA characters for the remaining phonemes.

=== Vowels ===
Fuyug possesses five vowel phonemes.

	Front	Back
Close	i	u
Mid	ɛ	o
Open		ɑ

The vowel /ɛ/ is pronounced as the diphthong [ɛi̯] when word-final as well as before a word-final consonant. For example, ateg ("truth") is pronounced [ɑˈtɛi̯ɡ] and ode ("where") as [oˈdɛi̯].

All vowels are nasalised before a nasal consonant, as in in ("pandanus") [ˈĩn], ung ("nose") [ˈũŋɡ], em ("house") [ˈẽĩ̯m].

=== Consonants ===
Fuyug has 14 consonant phonemes.

		Labial	Coronal	Velar
Plosive	Voiceless	p	t	k
Plosive	Voiced	b	d	ɡ
Fricative	Voiceless	f	s	
Fricative	Voiced	v		
Nasal		m	n	
Approximant		w	j	
Liquid			l	

The voiceless plosive are aspirated in a word-final position and before /i/: endanti ("outside") [ɛ̃nˈdɑ̃ntʰi], oki ("fire") [ˈokʰi], eyak ("return") [ɛˈjɑkʰ].

The nasal phoneme /n/ assimilates before a velar consonant becoming [ŋ] : yangos ("rain") [jɑ̃ŋˈɡos].

The pronunciation of the liquid /l/ is in free variation between a lateral [l] and a flap [ɾ]. However, with the exception of words of foreign origin where the word in the source language is written with an r, this is represented in the orthography as l.

=== Syllables ===
Fuyug syllables come in the shape (C)V(C)(C). There cannot be more than two consonants adjacent to one another word-internally and the only final clusters permitted are mb, nd and ng. Within a word vowels may not follow one another.

=== Stress ===
Stress in Fuyug is predictable. Stress falls on the final syllable in mono- and disyllabic words and on the antepenult in words of three of four syllables. Affixes do not alter the stressed syllable.

=== Morphophonology ===
Certain suffixes (notably the illative -ti) cause a change in the end of the word to which it is attached:

- m assimilates to n before t: im + -ti → inti ("in the eye")
- l is elided before t: uwal + -ti → uwati ("in the heart")
- Voiced plosives are devoiced at the end of a word when the following word begins with a vowel or a voiceless consonant: enamb + fidan → enamp fidan ("a road"), asang + ukas → asank ukas ("a lot of sand").
- an i is inserted between two consonant if the first is not l or a nasal: ev + -ti → eviti ("in the Sun"). With certain verbal suffixes an e is inserted: id + -ngo → idengo ("is sleeping").
- When a root with a final vowel has suffix or clitic attached to it that begins with a vowel, the first vowel is deleted: ne + -a → na ("he eats").

== Grammar ==
=== Personal pronouns ===
Fuyug has personal pronouns for three numbers (singular, dual, plural) but not gender distinction.

Person	Singular	Dual	Plural
1st	na	da	di
2nd	nu	ya	yi
3rd	hu	tu	mu

These pronouns can take four different suffixes: the genitive -l or -le, the emphatic -ni, the comitative -noy and the contrastive -v.

=== Numerals ===
Numerals in Fuyug are very restricted, having only fidan ("one") and yovalo ("two"). The numbers 3, 4 and 5 are composed of 1 and 2:

- 3: yovalo hul mindan ("two its other")
- 4: yovalo ta yovalo ("two and two");
- 5: yovalo ta yovalo ta hul mindan ("two and two and its other").

After five English numerals are used (numbers less than five often do so as well). The quantifier huka ("a lot") is also used after three.

== Bibliography ==
- Bradshaw, Robert L. (2007). Fuyug Grammar Sketch. Data Papers on Papua New Guinea Languages. Vol. 53. SIL-PNG Academic Publications. ISBN 9980-0-3353-3.
