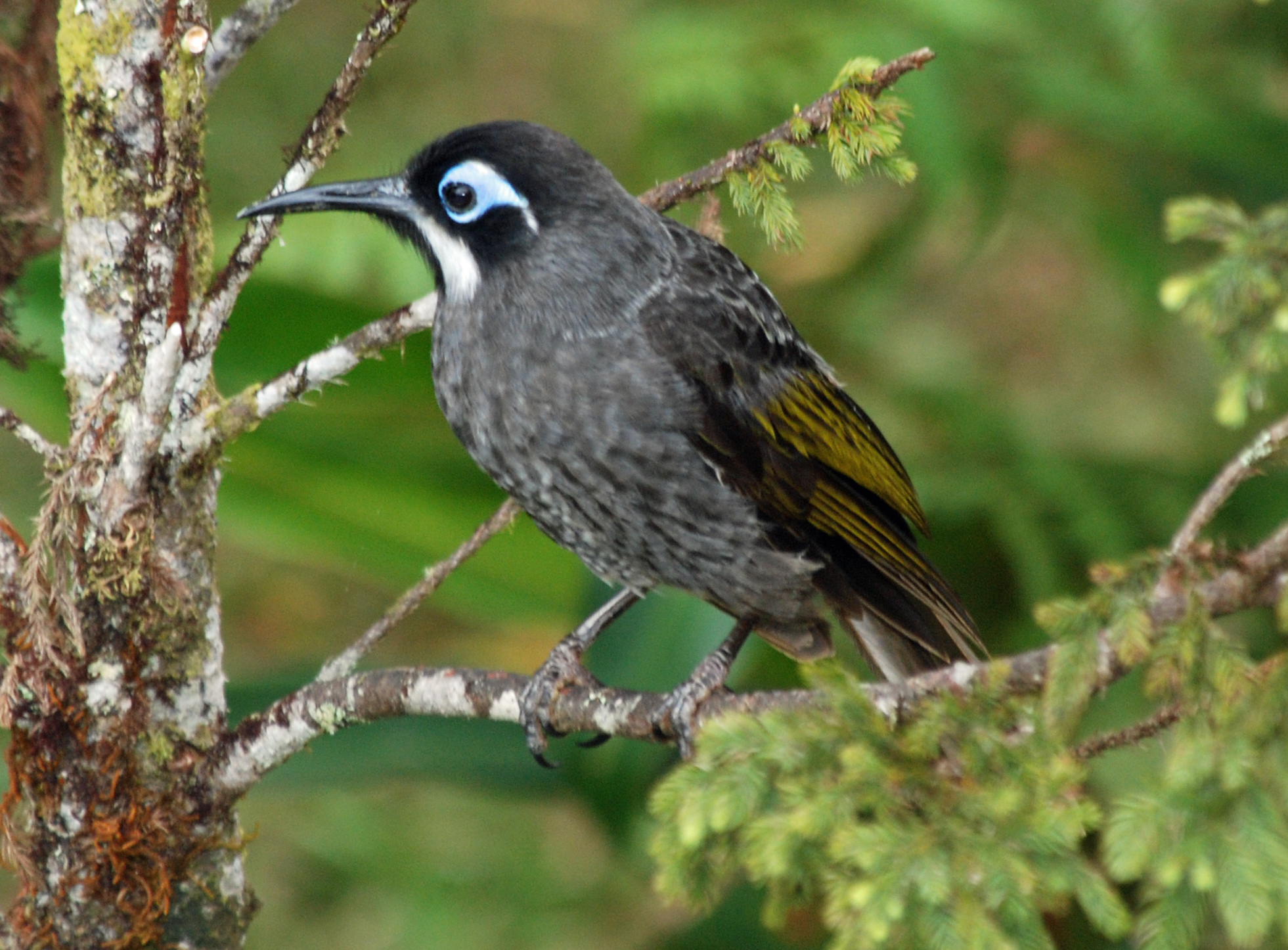

Conservation status
- Least Concern (IUCN 3.1)

Scientific classification
- Kingdom: Animalia
- Phylum: Chordata
- Class: Aves
- Order: Passeriformes
- Family: Meliphagidae
- Genus: Melidectes
- Species: M. belfordi

Binomial name
- Melidectes belfordi (De Vis, 1890)

= Belford's melidectes =

Species of bird

Belford's melidectes (Melidectes belfordi), also known as Belford's honeyeater, is a species of bird in the family Meliphagidae. It is found in the New Guinea Highlands. Its natural habitat is subtropical or tropical moist montane forest.

Its common name and Latin binomial commemorate George Belford, the son of a Samoan chief, who collected natural history specimens for Sir William McGregor, the Lieutenant Governor of British New Guinea in the late nineteenth century.
