= Kira Rural LLG =

Local-level government in Papua New Guinea

- Country: Papua New Guinea
- Province: Oro Province
- Time zone: UTC+10 (AEST)

District map of Oro Province

Kira Rural LLG is a local-level government (LLG) of Oro Province, Papua New Guinea. The Tauade language is spoken in the LLG.

== Wards ==
- 01. Pepeware
- 02. Gobe
- 03. Upupuro
- 04. Ovasupu
- 05. Oibo
