= Kunimaipa language =

Goilalan language spoken in Papua New Guinea

Kunimaipa
- Region: Papua New Guinea
- Ethnicity: incl. Biangai
- Native speakers: (14,000 cited 1978–2000)
- Language family: Trans-New Guinea: Goilalan; Kunimaipan; Kunimaipa

Language codes
- ISO 639-3: Variously: kup – Kunimaipa wer – Weri + Amam big – Biangai
- Glottolog: kuni1267 Kunimaipa weri1254 Weric bian1252 Biangai

Kunimaipa is a Papuan language of Papua New Guinea. The varieties are divergent, on the verge of being distinct languages, and have separate literary traditions.

== Phonemes ==
=== Consonants ===
		Bilabial	Coronal	Retroflex	Velar	Uvular
Nasal		m	n		ŋ ⟨ng⟩	
Occlusive	voiceless	p	t		k	
Occlusive	voiced	b	d̪ ⟨d⟩		ɡ ⟨g⟩	ɢ ⟨h⟩
Continuant	voiceless		s			
Continuant	voiced	β̞ ⟨v⟩	z			
Liquid			l	ɽ ⟨r⟩		

=== Vowels ===
	Front	Back
High	i	u
Mid	e	ʊ ⟨o⟩
Low	a	

== Morphophonemics ==
Each stem that ends with a has three kinds of allomorphs: a, o, and e. Allomorphs end with a in a word finally or before a syllable with a. It is the most common ending. O ending appears before syllables with o, u, or ai. E ending appears before syllable with e or i. All of above holds true, except the ending syllable before -ma. In the general morphophonemic rule, ending an appears before syllable with a. In the case of -ma, o appears before the syllable with a. For example, the sentence so-ma, meaning ‘I will go.’

== Words ==
=== Non-suffixed ===
Word classes that are usually not suffixed are responses, exclamations, attention particles, vocative particles, conjunctions, names, and particles. Responses are short replies on a conversation; such as, kara 'okay', ee 'yes', gu 'yes', ev 'no'. Exclamations is usually occurs on sentence boundary; such as, auma 'surprise', au 'mistake', maize 'regret', and aip 'dislike'. Attention particles are only used on reported speech; such as, gui 'call to come', ae 'attention getter', and siu 'attention getter -close'. Vocative particles are beginning of addresses in sentence boundary; such as, engarim 'hey, woman', erom 'hey, man', engarohol 'hey, children', and guai 'uncle'. Conjunctions are links in "phrases, clauses, and sentences"; such as, mete 'and, but, then', ma 'or, and', povoza 'therefore', and ong 'but, then'. Names label person, place, days, and months; such as, made-ta-ka, 'on Monday', and pode-ta-ka, 'on Thursday'. Lastly, one particles that is used in introducing a quote is never suffixed, pata meaning 'reply'.

=== Suffixed or non-suffixed ===
Word classes including adjectives, pronouns, interrogative words, nouns, and verbs can be suffixed or non-suffixed depending on the meaning and usage. Some example of adjectives in Kunimaipa are tina 'good', goe 'small', and hori 'bad'. The Kunimaipa language has 7 pronouns, including ne, ni, pi, rei, rari, aru, and paru. Example of od interrogative words are taira and tai meaning 'what'. Noun is a large word class including words such as abana 'men', abanaro 'young men', no nai nai 'everything', and mapo 'all'.

=== Not Classified According to suffixation ===
The word classes that cannot be classified by suffixation are locations, temporals, adverbs, and auxiliaries.
