= Cinnamon-browed melidectes =

Conservation status
- Least Concern (IUCN 3.1)

Scientific classification
- Kingdom: Animalia
- Phylum: Chordata
- Class: Aves
- Order: Passeriformes
- Family: Meliphagidae
- Genus: Melidectes
- Species: M. ochromelas

Binomial name
- Melidectes ochromelas (Meyer, 1874)

Species of bird

The cinnamon-browed melidectes (Melidectes ochromelas), also known as the cinnamon-browed honeyeater, is a species of bird in the family Meliphagidae. It is found in the New Guinea Highlands. Its natural habitat is subtropical or tropical moist montane forest.
