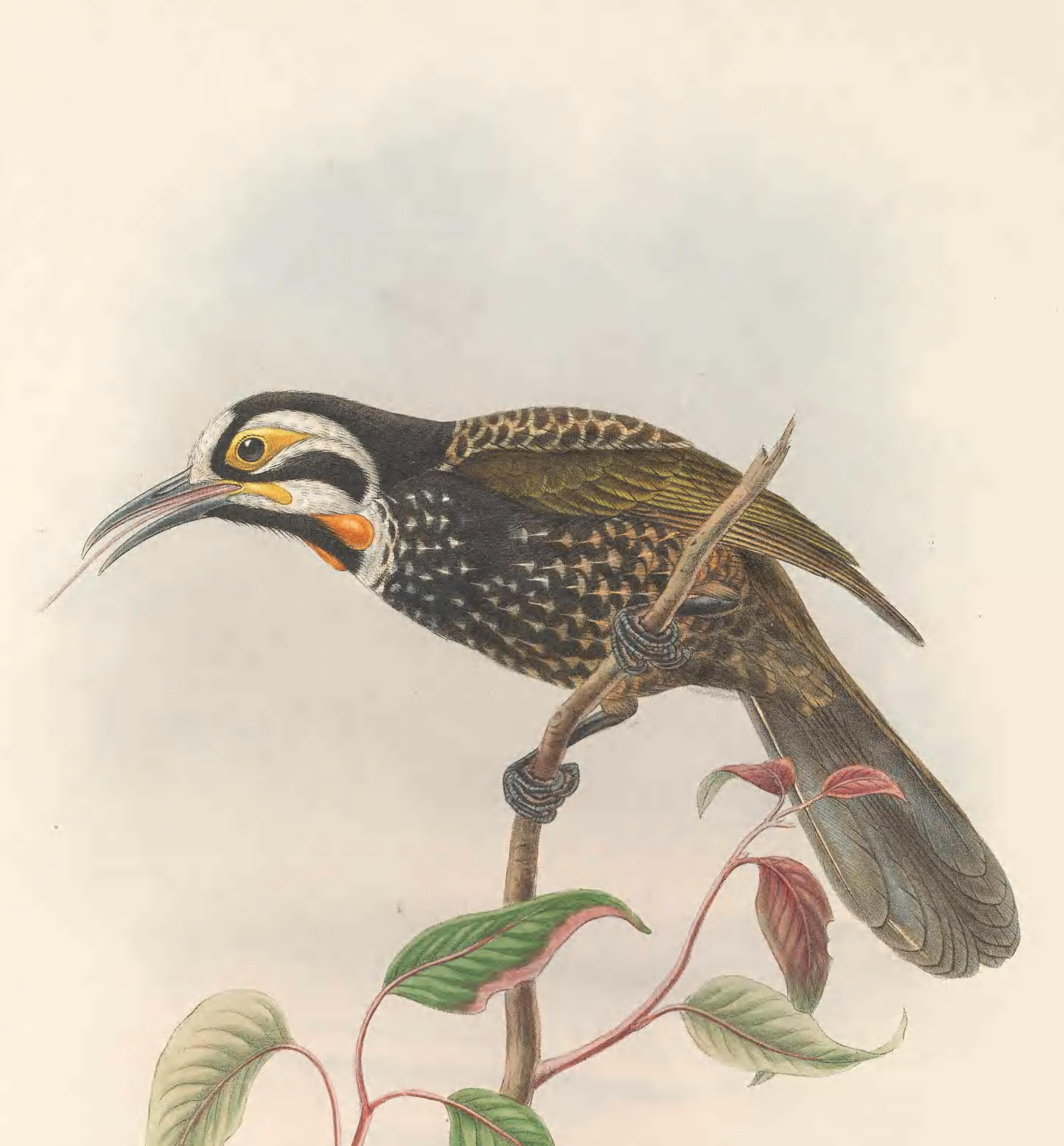

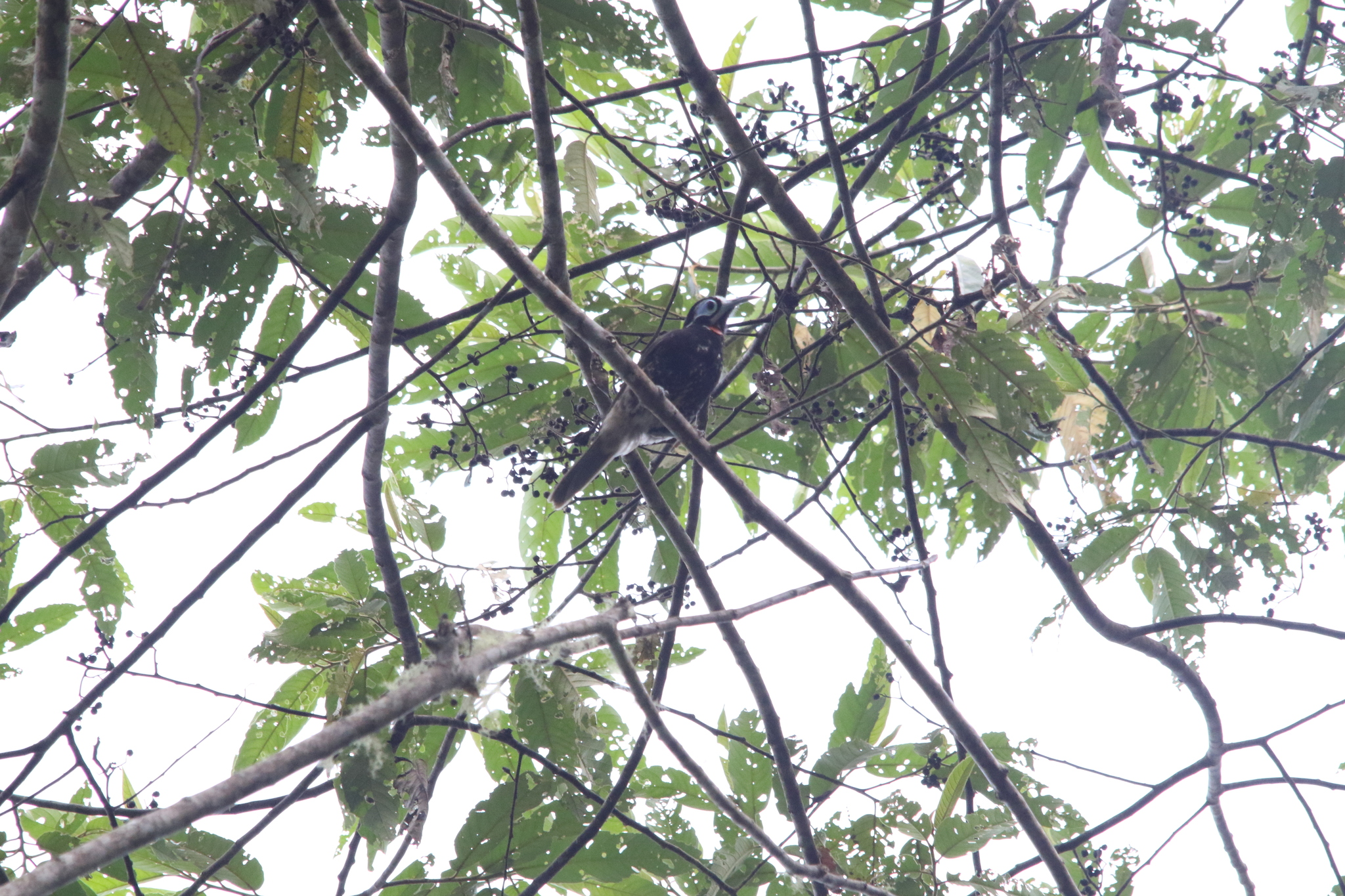

Conservation status
- Least Concern (IUCN 3.1)

Scientific classification
- Kingdom: Animalia
- Phylum: Chordata
- Class: Aves
- Order: Passeriformes
- Family: Meliphagidae
- Genus: Melidectes
- Species: M. leucostephes

Binomial name
- Melidectes leucostephes (Meyer, 1874)

= Vogelkop melidectes =

Species of bird

The Vogelkop melidectes (Melidectes leucostephes) is a species of bird in the family Meliphagidae. It is endemic to West Papua, Indonesia : northern Doberai and western Bomberai peninsula.

Its natural habitat is subtropical or tropical moist montane forest.
