= Tauade language =

Language in Papua New Guinea

Tauade
- Region: Papua New Guinea
- Native speakers: (7,000 cited 2000 census)
- Language family: Goilalan: Kunimaipan; Tauade

Language codes
- ISO 639-3: ttd
- Glottolog: taua1242

Tauade is a Papuan language of Kira Rural LLG in Central Province, Papua New Guinea.
