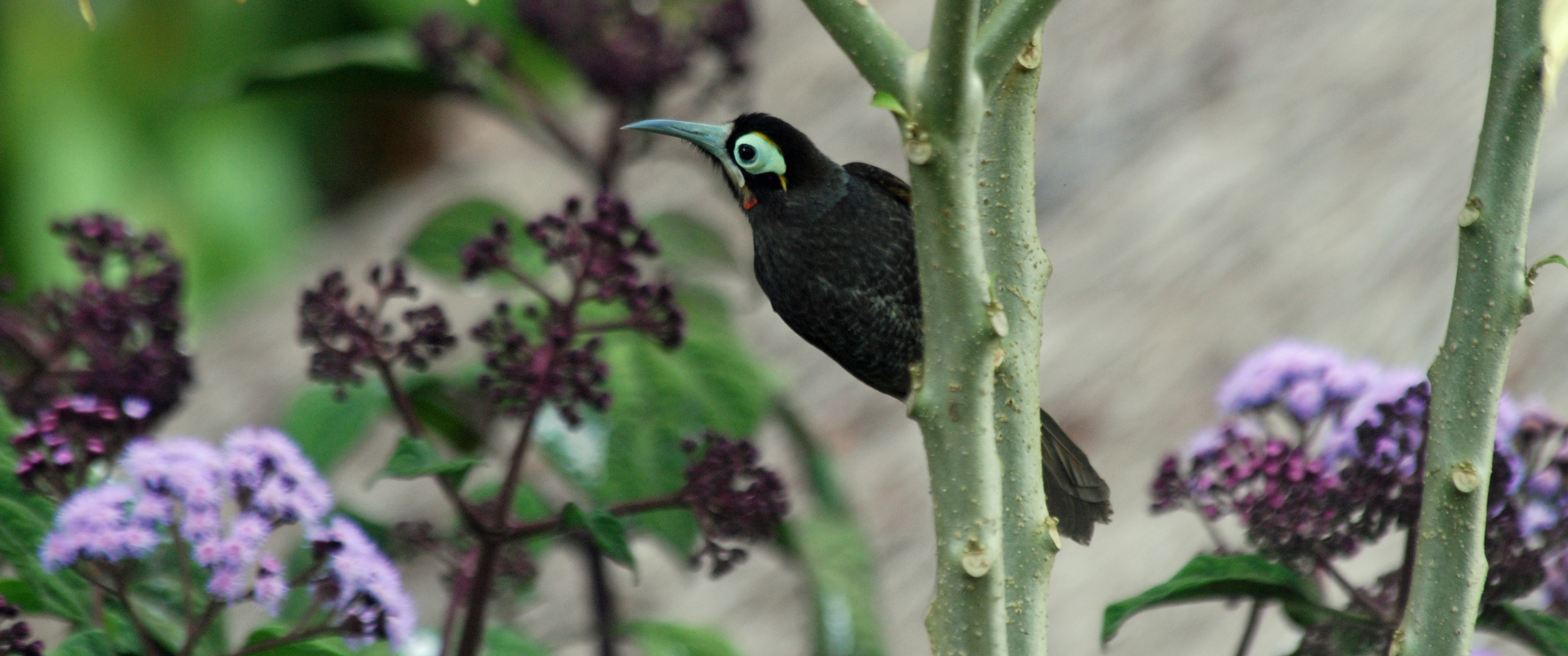

Conservation status
- Least Concern (IUCN 3.1)

Scientific classification
- Kingdom: Animalia
- Phylum: Chordata
- Class: Aves
- Order: Passeriformes
- Family: Meliphagidae
- Genus: Melidectes
- Species: M. rufocrissalis

Binomial name
- Melidectes rufocrissalis (Reichenow, 1915)

= Yellow-browed melidectes =

Species of bird

The yellow-browed melidectes (Melidectes rufocrissalis), also known as the yellow-browed honeyeater, is a species of bird in the family Meliphagidae. It is found mainly in Papua New Guinea. Its natural habitat is subtropical or tropical moist montane forest.
