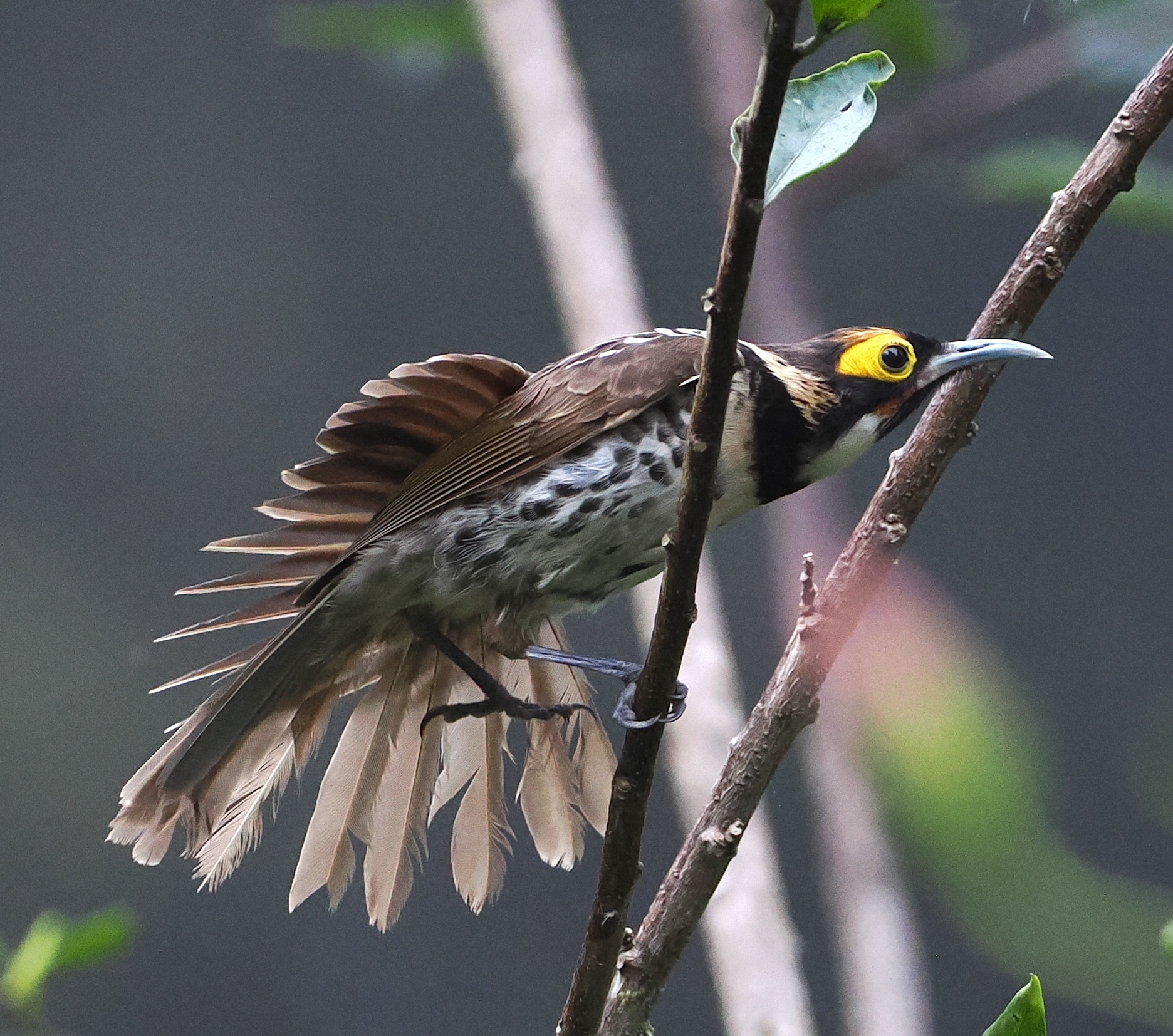

Conservation status
- Least Concern (IUCN 3.1)

Scientific classification
- Kingdom: Animalia
- Phylum: Chordata
- Class: Aves
- Order: Passeriformes
- Family: Meliphagidae
- Genus: Melidectes
- Species: M. torquatus

Binomial name
- Melidectes torquatus Sclater, PL, 1874

= Ornate melidectes =

Species of bird

The ornate melidectes or ornate honeyeater (Melidectes torquatus) is a species of bird in the family Meliphagidae. It is found in the New Guinea Highlands. Its natural habitat is subtropical or tropical moist montane forest.
