= Wharton Range =

Papua New Guinea mountain range

- Location within Papua New Guinea

Highest point
- Elevation: 3,191 m (10,469 ft)

Geography
- State: Papua New Guinea
- Range coordinates: 8°38′00″S 147°25′00″E

The Wharton Range is a mountain range in Papua New Guinea.

== See also ==
- Wharton Range languages
