= University of Papua =

Higher education institution in Manokwari, Indonesia

Coordinates: 0.8343°S 134.0701°E

- Universitas Papua
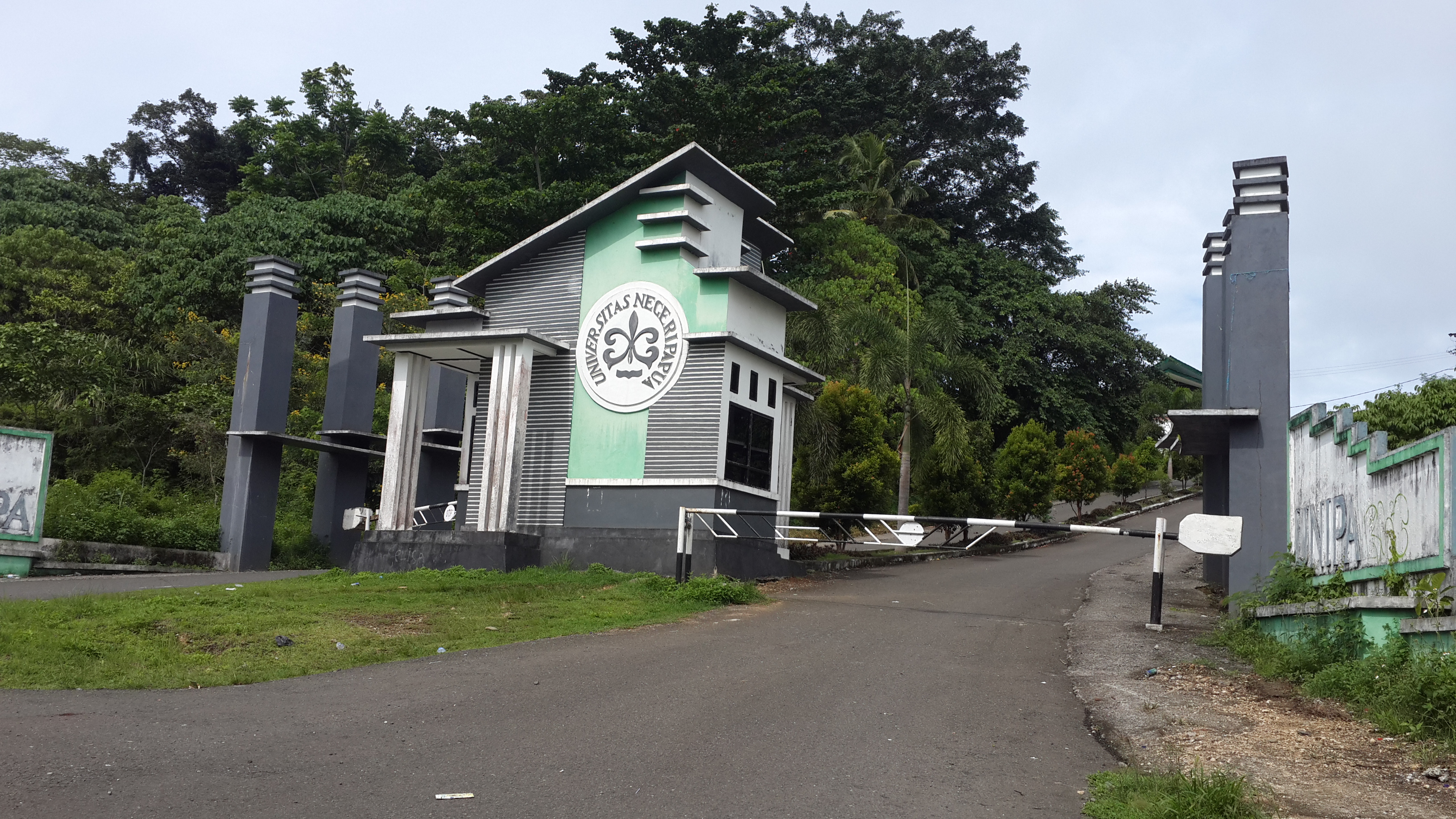
- Motto: Pro Humanitate Scientia
- Type: Public university
- Established: November 3, 2000
- Rector: Dr. Meky Sagrim, S.P., M.Si.
- Academic staff: 472
- Students: 11,338 (2020)
- Address: Jl. Gunung Salju, Amban Manokwari, Manokwari, Manokwari Regency, West Papua (province), Indonesia
- Colors: Purple and yellow
- Affiliations: FUIW, SEAMEO, AUAP
- Website: www.unipa.ac.id

The University of Papua (Indonesian: Universitas Papua) is a public university in the province of West Papua, Indonesia. It has three campuses: Manokwari, Sorong, and Raja Ampat. The university teaches Economics, Forestry, Agriculture, and Earth Sciences. In July 2023, UNIPA signed a Memorandum of Understanding with UKI Jakarta to enhance cooperation in higher education. This partnership focuses on joint degree programs, student and faculty exchanges, and collaborative research, aiming to support Indonesia's "Merdeka Belajar Kampus Merdeka" (Independent Campus Learning) policy.

== History ==
The university was founded on November 3, 2000. Previously, it was part of the Faculty of Agriculture of Cendrawasih University, based in Jayapura.

== Faculties ==
The university consists of 13 faculties:

- Faculty of Agriculture - Dean: Dr. Ir. Agus I. Sumule
- Faculty of Forestry - Dean: Ir. Bernardus B. Rettob
- Faculty of Animal Husbandry - Dean: Prof. Dr. Ir. Budi Santoso, MP
- Faculty of Mathematics and Natural Science - Dean: Dr. Drs. Bimo B. Santoso
- Faculty of Economics and Business - Dean: Dr. Ir. Achmad Rochani
- Faculty of Letters and Culture - Dean: Andreas J. Deda.
- Faculty of Agricultural Technology - Dean: Dr. Zita L. Sarungallo, S.TP., M.Si.
- Faculty of Fisheries and Maritime Studies - Dean: Ir. Mudji Rahayu, M.Si.
- Faculty of Engineering - Dean: Elias K. Bawan, ST, M.Eng.
- Faculty of Teaching and Education Science - Dean: Jan H. Nunaki, S.Pd., M.Si.
- Faculty of Social and Political studies - Dean: Dr. Hugo Warami, S.Pd., M.Hum (plt)
- Faculty of Medicine - Dean: Dr. Ir. Sintje Rumetor, MP (plt)
- Faculty of Mining and Petroleum Technology - Dean: Yulius G. Pangkung, S.T., M.Si.
