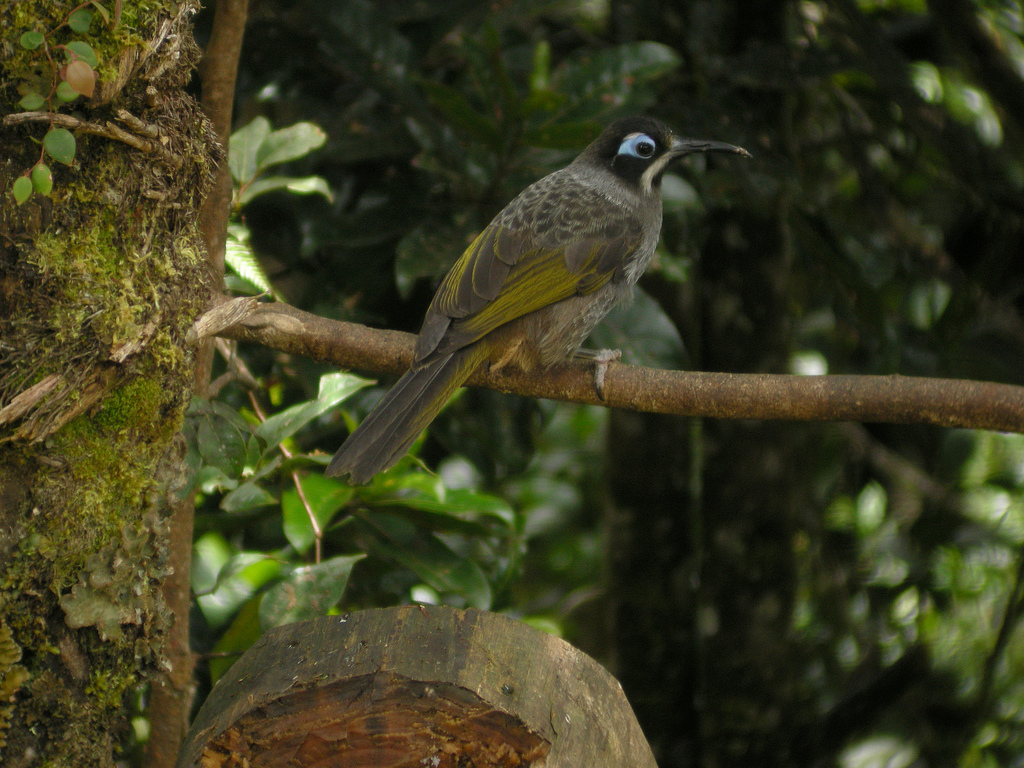
- Belford's melidectes

Scientific classification
- Kingdom: Animalia
- Phylum: Chordata
- Class: Aves
- Order: Passeriformes
- Family: Meliphagidae
- Genus: Melidectes; P.L. Sclater, 1874

Type species
- Melidectes torquatus Sclater, 1874

= Melidectes =

Genus of birds

Melidectes is a genus of bird in the honeyeater family Meliphagidae. All six species are endemic to New Guinea. The generic name is derived from the Greek meli for honey and dektes for beggar or receiver.

== Description ==
They are medium-sized honeyeaters, varied in appearance but possessing a long and sometimes stout bill and bare patch around the eye which is quite large and brightly coloured in some species.

== Habitat ==
The genus is overwhelmingly restricted to montane environments. They occupy mountain forest, forest edge, alpine shrubland and shrubby thickets in grasslands. In some instances where two species occupy similar ranges, for example the Belford's melidectes and the yellow-browed melidectes in the Schrader Ranges, the two species exclude each other and occur at different attitudes.

== Feeding ==
The diet of the melidectes is not known for all species, but for those that are known it consists of insects, nectar, pollen, fruit and berries. The short-bearded melidectes has also been recorded eating seeds. They feed in all levels of the forest, and in shrubs and thickets in more open environments. Some have been recorded feeding on the ground, either on ground plants or picking through the leaf-litter. They usually feed as singles, also foraging in pairs or small groups. Like many honeyeaters they may be aggressive towards other birds, including berrypeckers, painted berrypeckers, other honeyeaters and even other members of the genus. One study found that the Belford's melidectes aggressively defended the flowers of the terrestrial root parasite Mitrastemmaa from the ornate melidectes.

== Status and conservation ==
Many of the species of melidectes are restricted range species, occupying small global ranges; in many cases single mountain ranges. The most widespread species, the ornate melidectes, has actually benefited from human activities. That species prefers forest edge, secondary growth and gardens, and has apparently increased in numbers.

== Species ==
The genus contains the following six species:

Image	Name	Common name
	Melidectes ochromelas	Cinnamon-browed melidectes
	Melidectes leucostephes	Vogelkop melidectes
	Melidectes rufocrissalis	Yellow-browed melidectes
	Melidectes foersteri	Huon melidectes
	Melidectes belfordi	Belford's melidectes
	Melidectes torquatus	Ornate melidectes

Three additional species were moved to the resurrected genus Melionyx based on the results of a molecular phylogenetic study published in 2019.
