= Goilalan languages =

Language family of New Guinea

Goilalan
- Wharton Range
- Geographic distribution: Wharton Range, Central Province, Papua New Guinea
- Linguistic classification: Binanderean–Goilalan: Goilalan

Language codes
- Map: The Goilalan languages of New Guinea The Goilalan languages Trans–New Guinea languages Other Papuan languages Austronesian languages Uninhabited

The Goilalan or Wharton Range languages are a language family spoken around the Wharton Range in the "Bird's Tail" of New Guinea. They were classified as a branch of the Trans–New Guinea languages by Stephen Wurm (1975), but only tentatively retained there in the classification of Malcolm Ross (2005) and removed entirely by Timothy Usher (2020).

== Languages ==
The languages are,

- Fuyug
- Tauade
- Northern (Kunimaipa): Biangai, Kunimaipa, Weri

The languages are clearly related, especially northern Biagai, Kunimaipa, and Weri, which might be considered divergent dialects.

== Pronouns ==
Pronouns are:

- Northern: 1SG ne, 2SG ni, 3SG pi
- Tauade/Fuyug: 1SG na, 2SG nu

Tauade also has the possessive pronouns ne-ve, ni-e.

== Vocabulary comparison ==
The following basic vocabulary words are from SIL field notes (1973, 1975, 1980), as cited in the Trans-New Guinea database.

The words cited constitute translation equivalents, whether they are cognate (e.g. ʒuvalo, kupal'iai for “two”) or not (e.g. gadolo, kepapaí for “ear”). Notice the very low number of cognate pairs.

gloss	Fuyug	Tauade
head	hul ha; ondobe	kɔrɔtɔ
hair	are; hul haluma	awutu
ear	gadolo	kepapaí
eye	hul li; im	tavai
nose	hul hunga; unge	kiːtʰ
tooth	hul usi	nɔtɔvai
tongue	hul asese	aivi
leg	soga	lɔ'vai
louse	hi	dautʰ
dog	ho; oi	kɔveřa
pig	ovo	pɔřu
bird	nemba; nembe	kide
egg	hulombo	mutuwu
blood	tana	il'iví
bone	hude	keniví
skin	hul hoda; ode	kɔtipai
breast	hul duda	data
tree	i'i	eata
man	a'a; an	baře
woman	amu; amuri	iva
sun	evuli	vatava
moon	hama	ɔne
water	ʒu	ipi
fire	oki	e'na·m
stone	zo	evi'ti
road, path	enamba; inambe	bɔřiƀařa
name	ifa	ape'te
eat	huni nene	ɔmei nai
one	fida	kɔne
two	ʒuvalo	kupal'iai

== Evolution ==
Fuyuge reflexes of purported proto-Trans-New Guinea (pTNG) etyma are:

- baba ‘father’ < *mbapa
- sabe ‘saliva’ < *si(mb,p)at
- magata ‘mouth, jaw’ < *maŋgat[a]
- mele-pila ‘tongue’ < *mele-mbilaŋ
- imu ‘eye’ < *(ŋg,k)amu
- ije ‘tree’ < *inda
