= Kaijende Highlands =

Mountain range in Papua New Guinea

The Kaijende Highlands are a nearly uninhabited expanse of mountains near Porgera in Enga Province, Papua New Guinea. The highlands have been characterized as "some of Papua New Guinea's most pristine and scenic montane habitat". The Kaijende Highlands include Lake Tawa, Paiela Road, Omyaka Creek, Waile Creek and the Porgera Reservoir. The mountain range is 70 km north-west of Mount Hagen. According to a survey conducted in 2007, "areas like Kaijende are characterized by pronounced dominance of microtherm families, most notably by Cunoniaceae, Epacridaceae, Ericaceae, Geraniaceae, Myrsinaceae, Podocarpaceae, Ranunculaceae, Rosaceae, Theaceae, Violaceae, and Winteraceae."

The Kaijende Highlands have received media attention since 2005 due to a number of new species discovered in the area. A notable study compiled samples of 759 specimens from the Kaijende Highlands, which is among the largest surveys by CI-RAP in Papua New Guinea, and discovered 24 new species of plants and frogs among them. Other surveys have found new species of jumping spiders and other fauna.

== Biodiversity surveys ==
The Kaijende Highlands have received media attention between 2005 and 2010 due to a number of biodiversity studies which have discovered a plethora of new species of plants and animals. In August to September 2005, Conservation International and the Porgera Joint Venture, performed a biodiversity survey to "collect data on the species richness and conservation status of plants, herpetofauna, birds and mammals." According to the report published by Conservation International in 2007, "the flora and fauna of Enga Province are probably less well known than that of any other province in Papua New Guinea". The Porgera Joint Venture also participated in the development of a Wildlife Conservation Area in the Kaijende Highlands.

Another study, performed by Wayne Takeuchi of the Forest Research Institute compiled samples of 759 specimens from the Kaijende Highlands, which is among the largest surveys by CI-RAP in Papua New Guinea. The survey discovered 24 new species, including 16 new plants (5 arborescent taxa, 5 understory shrubs, 2 vines, 2 orchids, and 2 ferns), and 8 new species of frogs. According to Takeuchi, "New Guinea is home to one of the world’s richest floras." Subsequent research in the area has turned up other discoveries, including 6 new species of jumping spiders collected in 2009. Modern estimates approximate 15,000 to 20,000 species present on the island.
