= Oriomo =

Oriomo may refer to:

== Geography ==
- Oriomo Plateau of Papua New Guinea
- Oriomo River, a river in Western Province of Papua New Guinea
- Oriomo-Bituri Rural LLG, Papua New Guinea

== Languages ==
- Oriomo languages
- Bine language, a Papuan language of New Guinea
- Wipi language, a Papuan language of New Guinea
