= Torres Strait Island languages =

Three languages of the Torres Strait Islands

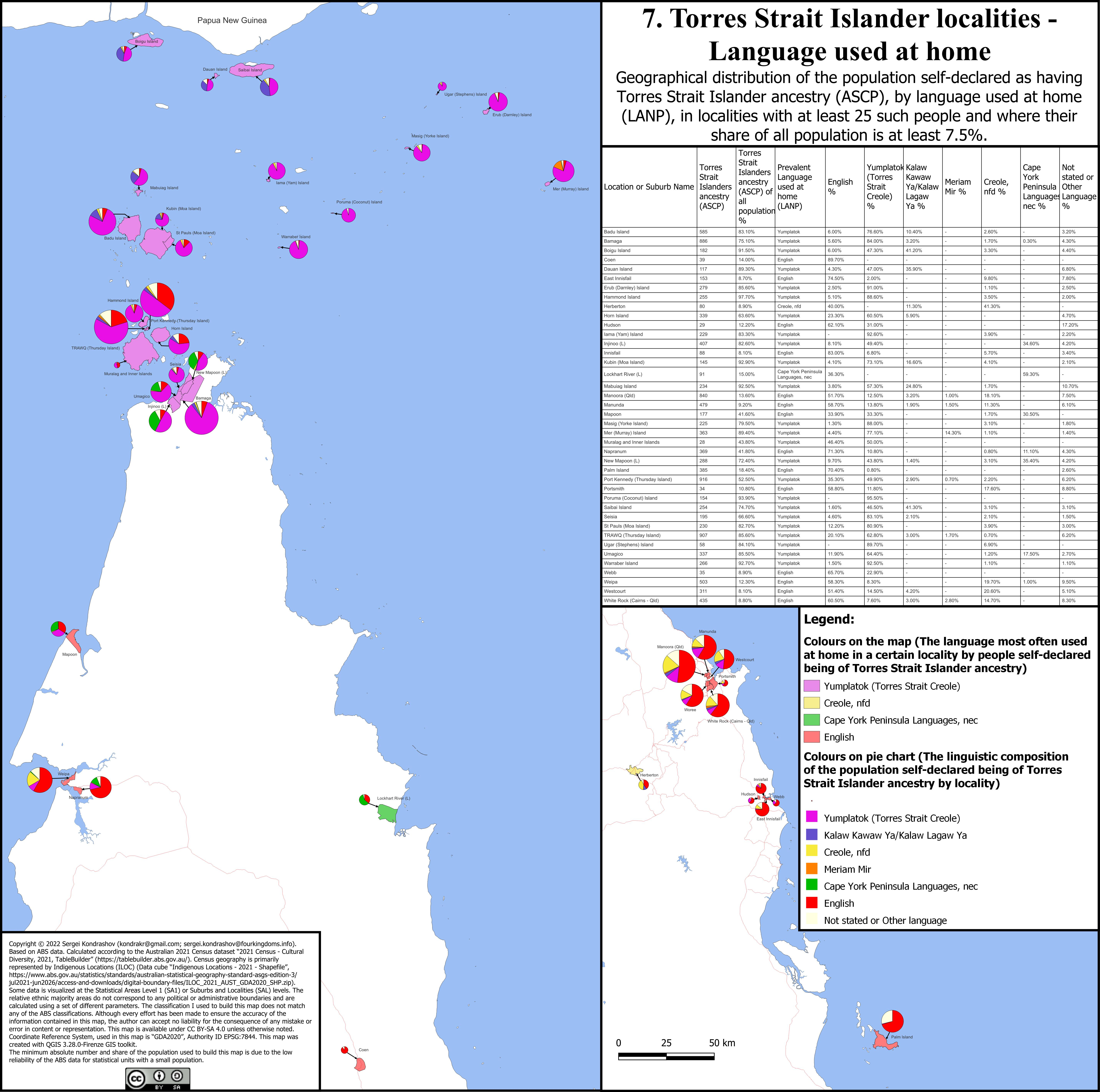
Languages used at home by Torres Strait Islanders in localities with significant share of Torres Strait islander population.

There are three languages spoken in the Torres Strait Islands: two indigenous languages and an English-based creole. Kalaw Lagaw Ya is spoken mainly in the western and central islands. It belongs to the Pama–Nyungan languages of the Australian mainland. The other indigenous language spoken mainly in the eastern islands is Meriam Mir: a member of the Trans-Fly languages spoken on the nearby south coast of New Guinea and the only Papuan language spoken on Australian territory. Yumplatok, or Torres Strait Creole, is the most widely spoken of the three. It is a creole language based on English.

== Kalaw Lagaw Ya ==
The language of the western and central islands of Torres Strait is related to languages of the Australian mainland and is a member of the Pama–Nyungan family of languages, which covers most of Australia. This language is known by its dialect names: Kalau Lagau Ya, Kalau Kawau Ya, Kulkalgau Ya and Kaiwaligau Ya (this latter also called Kowrareg, which is from the mid-19th century Kowrareg dialect form kauraraiga/kaurarega 'islander'. Kalau Lagau Ya is often called Kala Lagaw Ya in the literature.

Sydney Ray's "Linguistics" and Rod Mitchell's "Ngalmun Lagaw Yangukudu" are the main descriptions of the language. Ray contains a vocabulary list of both Mabuiag (as called by the Cambridge Expedition) and Meriam Mìr. In 2001 and 2003, Ron Edwards published the Torres Strait Languages vocabularies of Sydney H. Ray. This is the only dictionary available for use by Torres Strait Islanders and people who want to teach, learn and speak the Torres Strait languages. Unfortunately, neither the Ray work nor his vocabularies are very good, and contain many mistakes. The dictionaries can only be used in conjunction with knowledgeable native speakers to point out errors and corrections.

The four dialects of the Kalau Lagau Ya are very close to each other, somewhat like Standard American and Standard Australian English are to each other. Its vocabulary is potentially 80% non-Australian; much of the non-Australian content is Papuan (Trans-Fly) and Austronesian (South-East Papuan). It is an interesting language in having feminine and masculine gender, though no neuter gender [this is typical among Australian languages that have gender as well as many of the neighbouring Papuan languages] – and the difference is semantically significant in that many words can be masculine or feminine according to inherent reference or culturally significant reference. For example, za as masculine means 'an important topic/subject', and as feminine is 'thing, object'. Gœiga when masculine means 'sun', and when feminine means 'day'.

== Meriam Mir ==
The language of eastern Torres Strait is Meriam Mìr. This is a Papuan language and is related to the languages of the nearby coast of Papua New Guinea. Meriam Mir is the only Papuan language indigenous to Australia, and used to have two dialects, Erubim Mìr and Meriam Mir.

Both languages are strictly speaking mixed languages, Meriam Mìr having some Australian/Kalaw Lagaw Ya influence as well as Austronesian. It is probably the case that Meriam Mìr settlers overlaid earlier Kalaw Lagaw Ya speaking inhabitants on the Eastern islands (Eddie Koiki Mabo, cited in Wright et al 2022:15).

== Torres Strait Creole ==
The third language of the Torres Straits is a creole that developed from Torres Strait Pidgin English, the earliest records of which date to the mid 1800s, though creolisation started in the 1880s at the earliest. This Torres Strait Creole is also known as Broken/Brokan, Blaikman Tok, Big Thap and Yumplatok. It has five dialects – Papuan, Western-Central, Eastern, TI and Cape York.

== Sign language ==
Both languages have signed forms, though they are not reported to be particularly well-developed compared to other Australian Aboriginal sign languages.

== Examples ==
The table below shows how some example phrases differ in the Torres Strait languages. Kalau Kawau Ya, Kala Lagau Ya, Kulkalgau Ya and Kaiwaligau Ya, 'old' Kaiwaligau Ya are the dialects of Kalau Lagau Ya.

Comparison of phrases in Torres Strait Islander Languages and Dialects
English	I am an Islander	I go home/to the house
Kalau Kawau Ya	Ngai kawau mœbaig Ngai kawalaig	Ngai lagapa [uzariz]
Kaiwaligau Ya	Ngai kaiwau mabaig Ngai kaiwalaig	Ngai mudhapa [uzari]
Kalau Lagau Ya	Ngai lagalaig Ngai kaiwalaig Ngai lagau mabaig Ngai kaiwau mabaig	Ngai mudhaka [uzari]
Kulkalgau Ya	Ngai kaiwalaig Ngai kaiwau mabaig	Ngai mudhaka [uzari]
Kauřařaigau Ya (mid-1800s)	Ngayi kauřau mabaiga Ngayi kauřařaiga	Ngayi mudhapa/lagapa [uzarizi]
Meriam Mìr	Kaka kaur le nali Kaka ged le nali	Ka metaìm bakeamuda
Torres Strait Creole (Yumplatok)	Ai ailan man	Ai go aus
