= Oriomo-Bituri Rural LLG =

Local-level government in Papua New Guinea

- District map of Western Province

- Location within Papua New Guinea
- Coordinates: 8.83°S 142.89°E
- Country: Papua New Guinea
- Province: Western Province
- Time zone: UTC+10 (AEST)

Oriomo-Bituri Rural LLG is a local-level government (LLG) of Western Province, Papua New Guinea. Eastern Trans-Fly languages (also known as Oriomo Plateau languages) are spoken in the LLG.

== Wards ==
- 01. Dorogori
- 02. Wuroi
- 03. Wonie (Wipi language speakers)
- 04. Iamega (Wipi language speakers)
- 05. Wipim (Wipi language speakers)
- 06. Gamaeve (Wipi language speakers)
- 07. Tewara (Bitur language speakers)
- 08. Kapal (Wipi language speakers)
- 09. Upiara (Bitur language speakers)
- 10. Giringarede
- 11. U'ume (Wipi language speakers)
- 12. Masingara (Bine language speakers)
- 13. Kunini (Bine language speakers)
- 14. Iru'upi (Bine language speakers)
- 15. Waidoro (Gizrra language speakers)
- 16. Kulalai (Gizrra language speakers)
- 17. Wamarong
- 18. Sebe (Bine language speakers)
- 19. Wim
- 20. Sogale (Bine language speakers)
- 21. Kurunti
- 22. Abam (Wipi language speakers)
- 23. Boze (Bine language speakers)
- 24. Bisuaka (Bitur language speakers; also the Giribam dialect of the Makayam language)
- 25. Podare (Wipi language speakers)

== See also ==
- Oriomo languages
- Oriomo Plateau
- Oriomo River
