= Torres Strait Creole =

English-based creole language

- Yumplatok
- Region: Australia; Papua New Guinea
- Native speakers: 7,800 (2021 census); 20,000–30,000 L1–L3
- Language family: English Creole: Pacific; Torres Strait Creole

Language codes
- ISO 639-3: tcs
- Glottolog: torr1261
- AIATSIS: P2
- ELP: Torres Strait Creole
- Linguasphere: 52-ABB-cb (varieties: 52-ABB-cba to -cbd)
- IETF: tcs-AU (Australia) tcs-PG (Papua New Guinea)

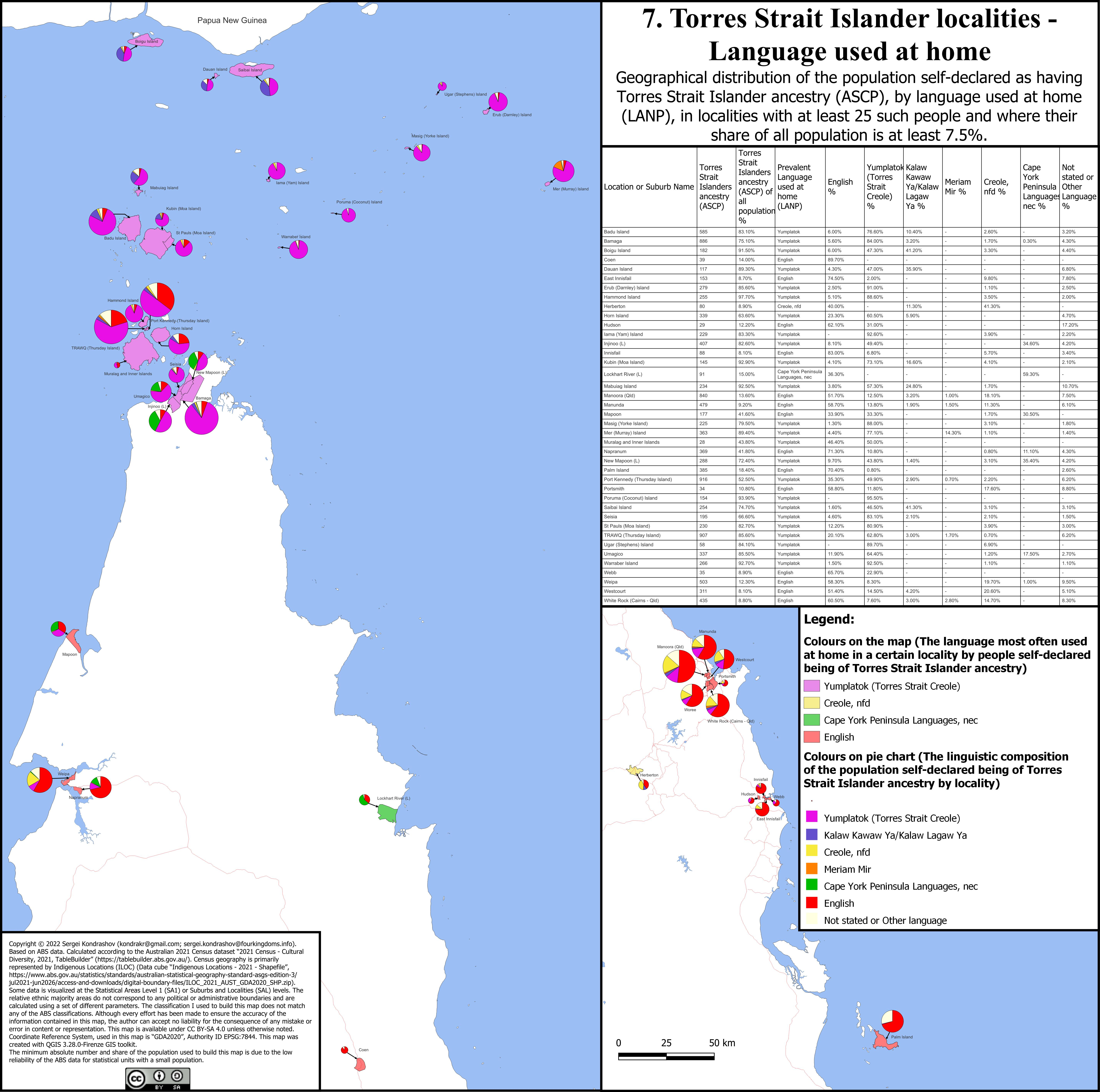
Languages used at home by Torres Strait Islanders in localities with significant share of Torres Strait islander population.

Torres Strait Creole (Torres Strait Creole: Yumplatok), also known as Torres Strait Pidgin, Brokan/Broken, Cape York Creole, Lockhart Creole, Kriol, Papuan, Broken English, Blaikman, Big Thap, Pizin, and Ailan Tok, is an English-based creole language (a variety of Pidgin English) spoken on several Torres Strait Islands of Queensland, Australia; Northern Cape York; and south-western coastal Papua New Guinea (PNG).

It has an estimated 20,000–30,000 mother-tongue and bi/tri-lingual speakers. It is widely used as a language of trade and commerce.

== History ==
Records of pidgin English being used in Torres Strait exist from as early as the 1840s (e.g. Moore 1979), and therefore Torres Strait Creole may very well be as old as, if not older than, its sister languages, and not a descendant of any of these. It was spread throughout the islands because many considered it to be English. The main importers of the pidgin were British and other sailors, many of whom were South Sea Islanders, both Melanesian and Polynesian, as well as Island South-East Asians, Jamaicans, Cantonese Chinese, Japanese, and others. Therefore, Torres Strait Creole has various characteristics of these different types of Pidgin, the main ones being mid- to late 1800s Malay-area Pidgin English (but not Singlish, one of its modern representatives), Pacific Pidgin and Jamaican Patois. It may have creolised quite early (pre-1900) on Darnley Island, and somewhat later (post-1910) at St Pauls on Moa and on Yorke Island in the Central Islands. Creolisation is post-1960s elsewhere.

The Papuan dialect was replaced by Hiri Motu in many parts of its former territory, which in turn is being replaced by Tok Pisin.

== Dialects ==
Torres Strait Creole has six main dialects: Papuan, Western-Central, TI, Malay, Eastern, and Cape York. Its main characteristics show that it is a Pacific Pidgin, but the future in X [i] go VERB aligns it with Atlantic Creoles. Related languages are Pijin of the Solomon Islands, Tok Pisin of Papua New Guinea, and Bislama of Vanuatu. The other creoles of Australia (such as Roper River Kriol and Australian Kriol language) are more distantly related, being descendants of the Pidgin English that developed in and around Sydney after the colonisation of Australia.

Dialects differ mainly from the influences in the various areas the language is spoken or by the language of the ethnic groups that use the language as well as a certain amount of superstrata influence from English. Apart from accent and intonation, differences are mainly vocabulary used for local fauna, flora and so on, retentions from local indigenous languages or other substrata languages (such as Malay) and minor differences in pronunciation because of substrata influences.

The dialects group generally into the Western-Central-Cape York dialects where the western and central language of Torres Strait (Kala Lagaw Ya) has a strong influence (an influence which is also 'over-powering' other sub-strata influences), 'TI' Brokan with a strong Malay/Indonesian-Filipino-European influence, Eastern Brokan with a South Seas and Meriam Mìr influence, and Papuan, with influences from languages such as Agöb, Bine, Gizrra, Wipi, Kiwai, Motu and (now) Tok Pisin. Influences from other languages such as Japanese are to do with vocabulary specific to Japanese (or the like) items.

== Continuum ==
Torres Strait Creole exists as part of a lect continuum: a local language (Kalaw Kawaw Ya), a local language mix called Ap-ne-Ap, a pidgin basilect creole, a mesolect English influenced creole, local Torres Strait (Thursday Island) English, and General Australian English, as this example shows:

- English: I'm really tired
- Thursday Island English: I'm proper tired
- Mesolect Brokan: Ai prapa taiad
- Basilect Brokan: Ai mina taiad
- Ap-ne-Ap: Ngai mina taiad mepa
- Kalau Kawau Ya: Ngai mina gamukœubaasipa

== Speakers ==
The 2021 Australian census recorded 7,776 people who spoke Yumplatok at home, up from 6,171 in the 2016 Australian census. Linguists working on the language have estimated that a considerably larger number, some 20,000 to 30,000 Indigenous Australians, speak it as a first, second, or third language. In 2007 a translation of the Bible was published, called the Holi Baibul, which was the first complete translation of the Bible into any Indigenous language within Australia.

Most Torres Strait Islander people speak Yumplatok in addition to their local languages, and a 2014 study suggests that the numbers of people speaking it are growing. It is widely used as a language of trade and commerce.

== Phonology ==
=== Vowels ===
The language has the following vowels (with some dialect variation):

	Front	Central	Back
Close	i ⟨i⟩		u ⟨u⟩
Close-mid	ɪ ⟨ì⟩ (Note: Found in Eastern dialects (in words from Meriam Mìr).)		ʊ ⟨ù⟩
Mid	e ⟨e⟩	ə ⟨œ⟩ (Note: Found in Western-Central-TI-Papuan (in words from English, Kala Lagaw Ya, Agöb, Gidra, Malay and other languages).)	o ⟨o⟩
Open-mid			ɔ ⟨ò⟩
Open	a ⟨a⟩		

Vowel length for the language as a whole is non-contrastive, though in some subdialects/dialects it appears to be contrastive.

=== Consonants ===
		Labial	Dental	Alveolar	Palatal	Dorsal
Nasal		m ⟨m⟩	n̪ ⟨n⟩			ŋ ⟨ng⟩
Plosive	voiceless	p ⟨p⟩	t̪ ⟨th⟩	t ⟨t⟩		k ⟨k⟩
Plosive	voiced	b ⟨b⟩	d̪ ⟨dh⟩	d ⟨d⟩		ɡ ⟨g⟩
Fricative	voiceless			s ~ tʃ ⟨s⟩		
Fricative	voiced			z ~ dʒ ⟨z⟩		
Sonorant		w ⟨w⟩	l̪ ⟨l⟩	ɾ ~ r ⟨r⟩	j ⟨y⟩	

The dental-alveolar contrast exists in the Western, Central and Cape York dialects, however only exists in other dialects in so far as either English or Western-Central influences force a contrast, or where the voiced alveolar stop ⟨d⟩ realises as the rhotic tap ⟨r⟩ (e.g. Western-Central wasamada 'what's the matter/what's wrong', Eastern/Papuan wasamara). In the Papuan dialects, the only alveolar consonant is ⟨r⟩, while ⟨t⟩ and ⟨d⟩ can be either dental (i.e. fall together with ⟨th⟩ and ⟨dh⟩) or alveolar, according to local language. In Meriam influenced Broken, ⟨t⟩ is dental, while ⟨d⟩ is alveolar.

The stops ⟨p⟩, ⟨b⟩, ⟨th⟩, ⟨dh⟩, ⟨k⟩ and ⟨g⟩ are aspirated and also have fricative allophones, particularly ⟨p⟩ (thus [pʰ~ɸ], [bʱ~β], [t̪ʰ~θ], [d̪ʱ~ð], [kʰ~x], [ɡʱ~ɣ]) while ⟨s⟩ and ⟨z⟩ vary in pronunciation when word initial and medial between [s~z] and [tʃ~dʒ], with only [s~z] appearing at the ends of words in Torres Strait and Papuan dialects. These reflect indigenous language allophony as well as a rationalisation of the larger English (and Malay, etc.) consonant phoneme inventory. The consonants ⟨t⟩, ⟨d⟩, ⟨m⟩, ⟨n⟩, ⟨l⟩, ⟨w⟩, ⟨y⟩ and ⟨ng⟩ do not have any major allophonic variation, while ⟨r⟩ varies between [ɾ] and [r] (particularly when syllable final), and in songs is often pronounced [ɹ].

== Grammar ==
=== Pronouns ===
The following are the forms of the personal pronouns in the Western-Central-Cape York dialects. Where the Eastern dialect is concerned, the dental-alveolar contrast is on the whole non-operative, and the dual forms are less commonly used than elsewhere. Furthermore, the 1–2 form yumi is often used as the general non-singular 1–2 form; and is sometimes used as such in other dialects in rhetorical discourse. The Central Islands dialect (and sometimes others) tends to also use wi for the 1st person plural.

number	1st person	1st–2nd person	2nd person	3rd person (identifying)	3rd person (non-identifying)
singular subject	ai	—	yu	em	i
singular non-subject (where different)	mi	—	—	—	em
dual subject	mitu	yumi	yutu	dhemtu	–
dual object (where different)	—	—	—	dhemtu/-emtu	–
plural subject	mipla	yumpla	yupla	dhempla	òl
plural object (where different)	—	—	—	dhempla/-empla	dhempla/-empla

The non-identifying 3rd plural òl is also found as a nominal plural marker:

- I gad òl bùk ianau 'There are books here'

==== Interrogatives and Demonstratives ====
- this, these: full form dhiswan, colloquial form dhisan, reduced, clause initial form san, sa
- that, those: full form dhaswan, colloquial form dhasan, reduced, clause initial form san, sa

There is a strong tendency for dhiswan and its forms to be used to the exclusion of dhaswan.

- Who is that? Dhaswan i udhat?, Dhiswan dhe i udhat?, Dhasan i udhat?, Dhisan dhe i udhat?, Dhisan i udhat?, San i udhat?, San dhe i udhat?

Three interrogatives and the two deictics have two forms, this being (interrogatives) a reduced clause initial form and a fuller clause final form, and in the case of the deictics, a pre-clitic and independent form, as in the following examples:

- Wane yu luk? [alt. Wane yu lukem?] / Yu luk wanem? 'What do you see?'
- Kenu i ya kam. / Kenu i kam iya. 'A canoe is coming this way.'

Clause position variation (initial, final)

- what: wane, wanem
- where: we, wea
- who: udha, udhat

Pre-clitic vs independent form:

- there: dhe, dhea
- here: ya, iya

Two interrogatives have variant words/forms, used interchangeably:

- when: wataim, wen
- why: aukam, wanempò

Dialectal variation is only found in two forms:

- how: wiswei; Central Islands: waswei
- why, what's the matter: wasamada; Eastern-Papuan wasamara

=== Articles ===
The language has no indefinite article, and uses the definite article much less than it is in English, it having a more demonstrative feel than the English equivalent. There are singular, dual and plural forms:

- singular: dha — dha kenu 'the canoe'
- dual: dhemtu, dhostu — dhemtu kenu, dhostu kenu 'the two canoes'
- plural: dhem — dhem kenu 'the canoes'

The demonstrative articles have a general form, and a specific dual form, as well as variation, with a strong tendency to use the clitics iya and dhea to specify position; the definitie articles are often used with the demonstrative clitics to express the demonstrative articles:

- this man: dhis man, dhis man ia
- these men (dual): dhistu man, dhistu man ia, dhemtu man ia
- these men (plural): òl dhis man, òl dhis man ia, dhem man ia
- all these men: òlgedha man ia
- that man: dhas/dhat man, dhis man dhea
- those men (dual): dhostu man, dhistu man dhea, dhemtu man dhea
- those men (plural): òl dhas/dhat man, òl dhis man dhea, dhem man dhea
- all those men: òlgedha man dhea

=== Syntax ===
Torres Strait Creole is a somewhat atypical of Pidgin-Creole languages in its word order and various other syntactic (and grammatical) properties. Though the normal sentence word order is the expected transitive S-V-O-X(-) and intransitive S-V-X(-), there is variation in the form of S-X-V(-O), such as where the directional adverbs dhe 'there' and ia/ya 'here' come before the verb, as happens in all local languages (this is in common with virtually all verb tense/aspect/mood markers in the language).

Verb clause strings are normal in the language:

- Bala blo mi bi teke kenu kam baik. 'My brother brought the canoe back'
- Plein i dhe plai go / Plein i dhe go plai / Plein i plai dhe go / Plein i plai go dhea 'The plane is flying away (over) there'

The four sentences in Torres Strait Creole carry a semantic difference difficult to show in the English translation. Plein i dhe go plai is the basic sentence — 'the plane is flying [away] over there'. Plein i plai dhe go is more along the lines of 'the plane is flying away that way'; plein i plai go dhea is 'the plane is flying away heading that way', and finally plein i dhe plai go is 'the plane is there flying away'.

Unlike many pidgin-creoles, the adjective categorically comes before the noun. Similarly, adverbs that mark adjectives come before the adjective:

- Big sisi bl'em bi kese tu prapa big redkala pis lo ausaid sanbaing. 'His/her big sister caught two really big red fish at/on the outer sandbank'

Unlike Tok Pisin, Bislama and the Australian creoles, -pla is not used as an adjective formant.

When not before the referent, adjectives are often suffixed by -wan, the adjective nominaliser, or by an appropriate nominal, such as man 'man, person'

- Bala blo mi i bigwan / bigman. 'My brother is big'
- Dhis dhamba ya i prapa naiswan. 'This bread is really nice'

All verb tense and aspect markers come before the verb (see Verbs below), apart from the clitic nau.

A fully operational relative clause structure exists, marked by the relative clause marker we:

- Dha totol we ai bi kese em i stap ananith lo aus. 'The turtle I caught is under the house'
- Ama bin luk smol gel we i dhe sidaun krai krai krai lo skul blo dhem piknini. 'Mum saw a little girl (who was) sitting and crying at the kids' school'

Questions vary between using English/Meriam Mìr-like word order, i.e. question word initially, or Kala Lagaw Ya/Malay-like word order, i.e. question word order is the same as that of statements. As stated above, the question word has its full form when used clause finally, and a reduced form otherwise. In yes–no questions, statement word order is normal, with the use of a question tag sentence clitic:

- We yu go? / Yu go wea? 'Where are you going?'
- Udha nem blo yu? / Nem blo yu udhat? 'What is your name?'
- Wataim em i go kam bai'gen? / Em i go kam bai'gen wataim? 'When is he going to come back?'
- Aukam yu sabe blaikman tok? 'How come you can speak the black people's language?'
- Bambai athe blo dhemtu i go stap ospetal au? 'Is their grandfather going to stay in hospital?'
- Yu pinis luk piksa a? 'Have you finished watching the film?'

=== Verbs ===
==== Transitivity and Voice ====
Verbs can be marked for transitivity and voice (transitive-passive or intransitive-antipassive), but not person, tense, aspect or mood. Voice marking is for the transitive-passive, and made by suffixing -e to the verb stem when the object follows the verb, and -em when the object is elsewhere in the clause. Note that the suffix -em is of fairly recent development, and is in origin an abbreviation of the verb phrase form VERB-e em, where the cross referencing pronoun em and the suffix have coalesced (via -i em → -yem → -em). All these versions exist in everyday speech, as illustrated by tek 'take': intransitive-antipassive tek, transitive-passive teke, teki em, tekyem, tekem:

- Em yustu tek òl buk. 'He used to/would take took all books' (antipassive)
- Em yustu teke dhem buk. 'He used to take the books' (transitive)
- Em yustu teke buk. 'He used to take a/the book' (transitive)
- Dha buk we em i yustu bi tekem i brok. 'The book he used to take is broken' (fronted object transitive)
  - Variants: Dha buk we em i yustu bi teke em / teki em / tekyem i brok.

The development of a full passive using this form also exists:

- Buk i yustu bi tekem lo em/prom em. 'A/The book used to be taken by him.' the lo–prom variation is dialectal)

===== Phonological variation of the transitive suffix =====
If the verb stem has e or a diphthong, then the transitive suffix is -e; if i or u, then it can become -i, while of the stem contains a or o, the suffix can become -a. One or two others verbs have stem extensions to form the verb from a noun:

- teke → teke 'take, bring'
- laite → laite 'light'
- pute → puti 'put'
- pile → pili 'feel something'
- broke → broka 'break'
- ama 'hammer' → verb amare
- pain 'point' → verb painte

Verb stems that end in vowels do not take the suffix, while a few verbs are irregular in not taking the suffix:

1. Vowel-final stem: lego 'to leave, depart, go off/away, throw, throw at'
  - Aka bi lego lo kenu. 'Grandma went off in the canoe'
  - Dhem nugud boi bin lego ston pò dhempla. 'The bad boys threw stones at them'
2. No suffix: luk
  - Ai bi luk pisin plai kam. 'I saw a bird flying towards me' (the suffixed form is sometimes used: Ai bi luki pisin plai kam).

==== Verbs of position and movement ====
Certain verbs of position and movement are not followed by a preposition in their most normal clause types. These are not to be confused with transitive clauses:

- Awa bi stap aus bikòs em i sikwan. 'Uncle stayed (at) home because he is sick'
- Dhem piknini stap dhe Bamaga we Kolez. 'The children stay at Bamaga at the College'
- Dha dog dhe ran go dingi. 'The/That dog is running to the dinghy'
- Pusi i sidaun seya. 'The cat is sitting in/on the chair'

==== Verb suffixes ====
Four derivational suffixes exist which add aspectual meaning to verb stems. Though their origin are English intransitive prepositions, in Torres Strait Creole their status is completely aspectual; they can only be used as suffixes. They are suffixes to the stem of intransitive verbs, and to the full transitive-passive form of transitive verbs. When used as transitive-passive verbs, they also suffix the transitive ending after the suffix. They also derive verbs from other words.

- -ap — completive, perfective: piksimap(e) 'fix, repair, mend'; rol 'roll' → rolemap(e) 'roll up'; bagarap(e) 'ruin, break, destroy'
- -aut — movement outwards: kamaut 'come out'; goaut 'go out'; lugaut(e) 'be careful, beware, take care of, look after'
- -baut — dispersive (this suffix causes the final voiceless consonant of the stem to become voiced): wagbaut 'walk, walk about, walk around, stroll'; togbaut(e) 'talk about/over, discuss'
- -daun — downwards movement; only found in godaun 'movement downwards from a starting point'; kamdaun 'movement downwards from above', sidaun 'sit down', pòldaun 'fall, fall over, fall down'.

=== Sample verb conjugation ===
lugaut 'take care, beware'
remote future	bambai X (i) go lugaut
near future	X (i) go lugaut
non-specific present	X (i) lugaut
specific present	X (i) lugaut nau
recent past	X (i) zasnau (bin) lugaut
past	X (i) bin lugaut
completive past	X (i) pinis/oredi lugaut
habitual past	X (i) yustu bin lugaut
advice	X (i) sud lugaut
obligation	X (i) mas/aptu lugaut
dependent obligation	X (i) blo/spostu lugaut
continuative	X (i) matha lugaut
multiplicative	X (i) lugaut-lugaut
lengthening	X (i) lugaut lugaut lugaaaaauut
simplicative	X (i) dhasol lugaut X (i) matha dhasol lugaut
ordinaritive	X (i) dhasol lugaut X (i) kasa (dhasol) lugaut
imperative	X lugaut! X lugaut kai!

=== Prepositions ===
Torres Strait Creole shows strong substrata influence in its use of its prepositions. All local languages are either prepositionless case-marking agglutinative languages, or case-marking agglutinative languages where the case endings have evolved to postposition status, which contrast the following cases to varying extents, but which have little or no number marking on nouns:

- nominative
- accusative
- ergative
- genitive
- dative
- ablative
- locative
- perlative
- instrumental

They also contrast the following derived forms (among others according to language), which are not case forms in the local languages, but rather nominals:

- similative
- privative
- proprietive
- resultative

The use of the prepositions in Torres Strait Creole reflect these cases and nominalisations to a certain (= simplified) extent:

blo — genitive:
We aus blo misnari? Where is the priest's house?

pò, lo — dative (in part dialect variation):
Em i bin spik pò em se wesis bl’em pinis kam. She told her her wages had already arrived.
Bos i bi gibi wesis pò/lo mi. The boss gave the wages to me.

prom – ablative:
’San i dhe kam prom Dhaudhai. This one is coming over from Papua.

lo, we, ene — locative, perlative (lo and we are synonyms, while ene is an archaic word now normally found only in old songs):
Aus blo Ama blo mi i stanap dhe antap lo / we il ananith lo / we big mango dhe antap. My Aunty's house is up there on the hill underneath the big mango up there.
Yu mas kam wantaim lo mi. You must/have to come with me.
Dhemtu baradha i sidaun ene [lo/we] kenu The two brothers were sitting in the canoe.

lo — instrumental:
Òl man i kate tœtœl lo naip lo bele / lo ath The men cut (butcher) the turtle with a knife on the bottom shell.

òlsem, waze (waze is the somewhat more common reduced form of òlsem) – similative (like):
Dhempla lo Mari Ailan i no tòk waze yumpla. The people on Murray Island don't talk like us.
Em i dhe swim go waze aligeta. He's swimming away over there like a crocodile.

==== Syntactic use of the prepositions ====
The prepositions also have syntactic uses, including the following, where they govern verbs or adjectives:

Blo: obligation
Ai blo go nau I have to go now / I'm supposed to go now.

Pò: a) focus on a goal
Bos i kam pò luk wòk blo yumi. The boss has come to see / look at our work.
b) extra intensity
Dhem pipol blo Saibai i pò dans! The Saibai people can really dance!
Ai pò taiad nau! I'm getting really tired!

Prom: avoidance
Smòl gel i prait prom dog i baite em. The little girl is afraid that the dog will bite her

lo, prom — comparative (dialect variation):
Dhis dhangal ia i mò big prom/lo nadhawan dhea This dugong is bigger than that one.

We: relative clause
Aus we Ama i stap i antap lo il we i gad wan big mango. The house where Aunty lives is on the hill where there is a big mango.
Boi we yumi bin paitem i krai go Ama bl'em. The boy that/who we fought went off crying to his Mum.
Òl pipol we i wande gud wòk i mas lane ingglis Everyone who wants a good job has to learn English.

Waze (òlsem): in order, so that
ze em i ken luk òl wòk blo yumi. The Boss is coming so that he can see our work.

== Vocabulary ==
The language has vocabulary from various sources, though the dominant source is English. Here are lists of Non-English words found in Torres Strait Creole:

Kalaw Kawaw Ya: yawo 'goodbye', matha 'only, very', mina 'really, truly', babuk 'crosslegged', aka 'granny', puripuri 'magic action, spells, products, medicines etc.' (from the early Kauraraigau Ya [Kowrareg — the Southern dialect of Kalaw Lagaw Ya] word puri; in modern Kala Lagaw Ya the word is puyi).

Meriam Mir: baker (bakìr) 'money' (beside the more general baks), watai (wathai) 'bamboo break-wind fence'.

Austronesian (Malay, Tagalog, Samoan, Rotuman, etc.): thalinga 'ear', bala 'brother, male friend', thuba 'coconut toddy', makan 'eat', dudu 'sit', kaikai 'eat', nene 'granny', datho, 'grandfather', thawian 'brother-in-law'.

Portuguese: pikinini child, sabe 'to know, understand, know how to, can'

== Sample texts ==
Brokan i kriol langgus we òl i spikem lo dhem ailan blo Thoris Stret, lo nòthsaid gowe prom Kep Yòk, ausaid lo SauthWessaid blo Papua. I gad samwe waze 25,000 pipol i sabe tòkem waze namba-wan langgus, namba-tu langgus 'ne namba-thri langgus blo dhempla. Òl i yuzem lo plande ples waze langgus blo treiding an pò bai òl samthing. I gad siks kain Brokan: blo Papua, blo Westen-Sentrel, blo Tiai, blo Maleman, blo Esten, blo Kep Yòk. Òl dhem wòd blo em soem dhiskain pò yumpla, waze em i pizin blo Pasipik, dhasòl i gad wanwan thing, òlsem we yumpla spik pò taim we i go kam, yumpla yuzi dhis tòk: X [i] go meke samthing, dhisan i gad rilesen lo Kriol blo Atlantic, blo Zameka.

Thri langgus we i òlsem Brokan i Pijin blo Solomon Ailan, Tok Pisin blo Niu Gini, ane Bislama blo Banuatu.

=== The Lord's Prayer ===
Padha blo mipla, yu we yu stap dhe antap lo eben,
Nem blo yu mipla mas mekem oliwan,
Bambai basalaya blo yu i mas kam,
Òl i mas meke laik blo yu iya lo apaguwa, òlsem òl i mekem we eben.
Gibi dhamba blo tide pò mipla,
Pigibi òlgedha nugud pasen blo mipla, òlsem mipla pigibi nugud pasen blo dhempla we òl i meke nugud pasen pò mipla.
No libi mipla go pò laik pò nugud thing,
Kasa dhasòl lego mipla prom nugudwan.
(Waze basalaya i blo yu, 'ne pawa,'ne glòri,)

Amen.

== Bibliography ==
- Shnukal, Ann (1988). Broken: an introduction to the Creole language of Torres Strait. Canberra, ACT: Australian National University, Research School of Pacific Studies, Dept. of Linguistics.
