= Wipi language =

Eastern Trans-Fly language spoken in Papua New Guinea

Wipi
- Gidra
- Native to: Papua New Guinea
- Native speakers: (3,500 cited 1999)
- Language family: Trans-Fly: Eastern Trans-Fly; Wipi

Language codes
- ISO 639-3: gdr
- Glottolog: wipi1242

Wipi, also known as Gidra, Jibu or Oriomo, is a Papuan language of New Guinea. It is a member of the Eastern Trans-Fly family, the other languages of this family being Gizrra, Meriam Mir and Bine. The family has influenced the neighbouring Kiwai language as well as Kalau Lagau Ya.

== Distribution ==
Wipi is spoken in fourteen main villages, with the Wipim village as the centre. Wipi speakers occupy a broad swathe of inland territory in the eastern plains between the Fly River and the Torres Strait, specifically around the Oriomo River and Binaturi River.

== Phonology ==
Phonology of the Wipi language:

=== Consonants ===
	Labial	Alveolar	Palatal	Velar
Plosive	p b	t d		k ɡ
Implosive	ɓ			
Nasal	m	n		ŋ
Rhotic		ɾ		
Fricative		s	ʝ	
Lateral		l		
Approximant	w			

=== Vowels ===
	Front	Central	Back
High	i	ɨ	u
Mid	e		o
Low		a	
