= Meriam language =

Trans-Fly language of the Australian Torres Strait Islands

Meriam
- Eastern Torres Strait
- Meriam Mir
- Region: Murray Island, Torres Strait, Queensland, Australia
- Ethnicity: Meriam
- Native speakers: 217 (2016 census)
- Language family: Trans-Fly?: Eastern Trans-Fly; Meriam
- Dialects: Erub; Ugar
- Signed forms: Eastern Torres Strait Islander Sign Language

Language codes
- ISO 639-3: ulk
- Glottolog: meri1244
- AIATSIS: Y3
- ELP: Meriam
- Linguasphere: 20-OD(A-a)
- Meriam Mir is classified as Definitely Endangered by the UNESCO Atlas of the World's Languages in Danger (2010)

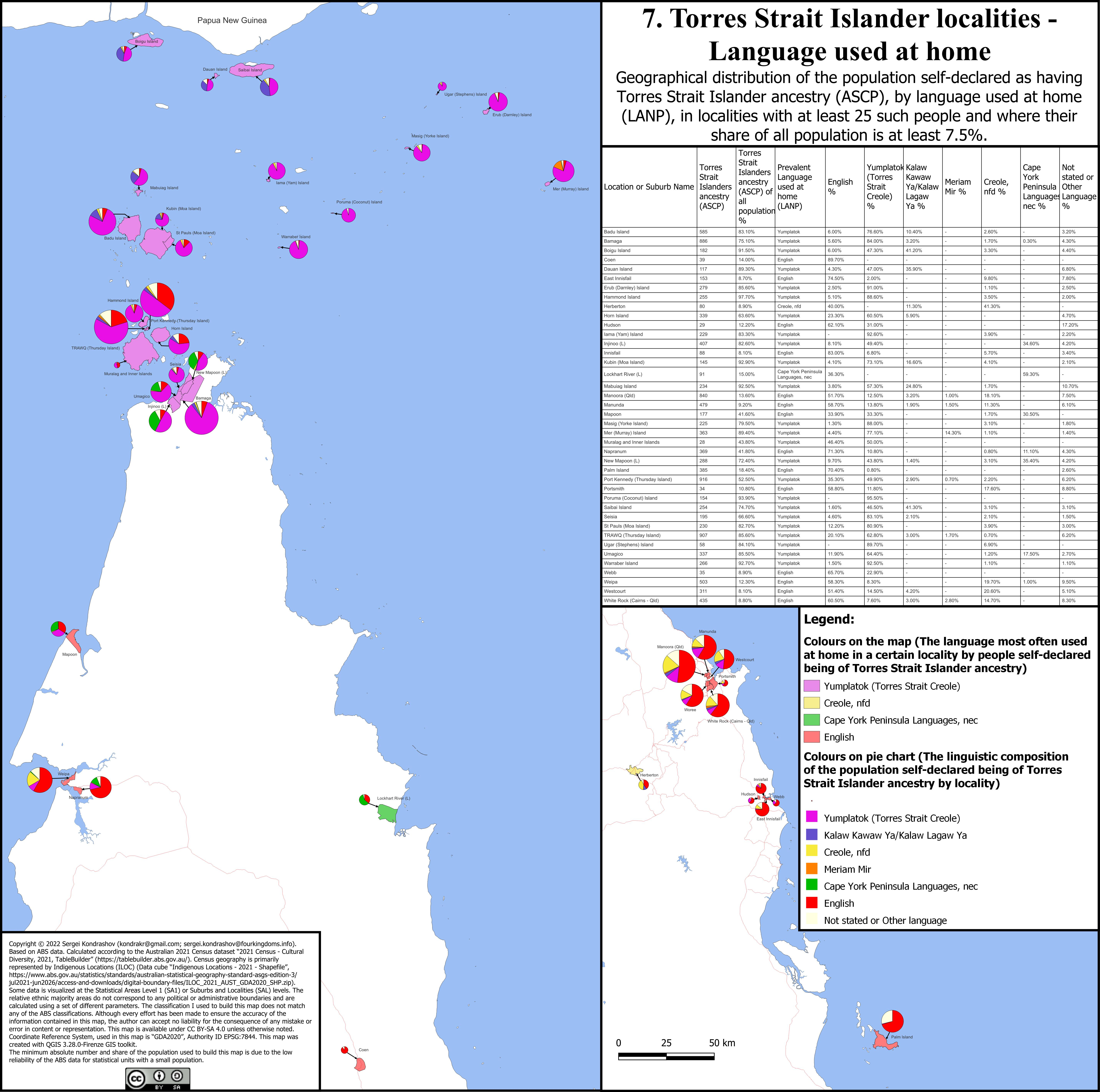
Languages used at home by Torres Strait Islanders in localities with significant share of Torres Strait islander population.

Meriam (Meriam Mir: Meriam Mìr; also Miriam, Meryam, Mer, Mir, Miriam-Mir, etc. and Eastern, Isten, Esten and Able Able) or the Eastern Torres Strait language is the language of the people of the small islands of Mer (Murray Island), Waier and Dauar, Erub (Darnley Island), and Ugar (Stephens Island) in the eastern Torres Strait, Queensland, Australia. In the Western Torres Strait language, Kalaw Lagaw Ya, it is called Mœyam or Mœyamau Ya. It is the only Papuan language in Australian territory.

== Classification ==
Meriam was classified in the Eastern Trans-Fly family of the Trans–New Guinea Phylum by Stephen Wurm, who however felt that these have retained remnants of pre-Trans–New Guinea languages; this is followed by Ethnologue (2005). In 2005 Malcolm Ross concluded that the Eastern Trans-Fly languages were not part of the Trans–New Guinea phylum. R. M. W. Dixon (2002) regards claims of a relationship between the Fly River languages and Meriam as unproven, though what he bases his claim on is not clear, as Meriam Mir has a high cognacy rate with its sister languages, and a certain amount of mutual intelligibility is claimed by Meriam speakers. Mitchell finds that Meriam Mìr has 78% cognates with its sister Trans-Fly Papuan languages, the remaining vocabulary being mainly of Australian origin. Such Trans-Fly cognates include personal pronouns, and verbal and nominal morphology.

Percentages of Australian, Papuan and Austronesian content (2) = number of items; Mitchell, Holman et al. 40-word list
Source	WCL (Kalaw Lagaw Ya)	MM
Australian	22.5% (9)	5% (2)
Papuan	22.5% (9)	62.5% (25)
Derivations/Compounds	20% (8)	17.5% (7) [common to Eastern Trans-Fly 15% (6)]
Austronesian	12.5% (5)	2.5% (1)
More than one possible origin	15% (6)	17.5% (7)
Unclassifiable	32.5% (13)	20% (8)

== Status ==
In the 2016 Australian census, 217 speakers were recorded, up slightly on the previous (2011) census, which recorded 186. It is considered an endangered language by UNESCO.

There is a push to preserve the language in North Queensland. A group of Torres Strait Islander people in Mackay region, where there are only four fluent speakers left, are practising and teaching traditional hymns sung in Meriam Mir in an effort to help more people to learn the language and pass it down. It is hoped that a program to teach the hymns will be introduced into schools.

== Meriam Mìr and its neighbours ==
Meriam has around 40 percent of its vocabulary in common with its unrelated Western Torres Strait neighbour Kala Lagaw Ya, which is an Australian language. The shared words cover a wide range of semantic domains (body parts, kin, human classification, language, mythology, ceremony, artefacts, topography, natural elements, marine life, qualities, locations, directions and time), though not verbs. This latter strengthens arguments about genetic diversity, however there is still much to suggest mutual influence. The common vocabulary range from "exact cognates" to words that appear related, but have undergone semantic changes, as in the following selected from a list of 250 items (Mitchell 1995) (where exact "cognates" number 62 (24.8%), partial "cognates" 26 (10%) and "cognates" with semantic differentiation number 34 (13.7%), [122 "cognates" in total, 48.8%]):

Exact "cognates"
WCL	MM	meaning
dhangal(a)	deger	"dugong"
bal	bar	"across/crooked"
gamu	gem	"body"
riidh(a)	lid	"bone, leaf rib"
saamu	sam	"cassowary"
thawal(a)	tawer	"coast"
gabu	geb	"cold(ness)"
ùmai	omái	"dog"
ngœnakap(u)	nerkep	"heart"
naigay(i)	naiger	"north/north-east"
wathai	watwet	"dry"

partial "cognates"
WCL	meaning	MM	meaning
dhang(a); KLY dhaanga	"edge, tooth"	deg	"edge, side"
wati	"bad, evil"	wìt	"wrong doing"
mùdh(a); KLY mùùdha	"shelter, backyard, shaded place, haven"	mùd	"shade"
gœiga stem gœigœyi-	"sun, day"	gerger	"day"
wœibadh(a)	"roe" (badh(a) "food bed")	wer	"egg"
Baba, Baab(a)	"Dad, Daddy"	bab	"father"
[wœra]kapu	"one (only)" (wara "one of a group, other")	kepkep	"few"
karùm(a)	"goanna; clumsiness, mistake"	karom	"black skink; clumsiness, mistake"
ngœna	"breath, intellect, memory"	ner	"breath"
kaimi; kaimel, KKY kalmel	"companionship, companion, co-"; "together, along with"	kem	"company; associative (case)"

semantic differentiation
WCL	meaning	MM	meaning
thapi	"thin piece of bark or wood, page"	tep	"fruit skin"
kapu	"prong"	kep	"arrow"
maitha	"belly"	mait	"chest"
susu	"white sap"	susu sus	"spray, foam" "white sap"
uum(a) awum(a)	"death" "mourning"	eumi (singular) baum (plural) (stem -um)	"die"
buudh(a)	"white paint" (for mourning)	bud	"mourning"
aap(a) apa-	"garden bed" "down, below, under"	sep	"earth, ground; down, below, under"
KKY, KulY kom(a); KKY, KulY kœman(a); KLY, MY-KY kœman(a)	"heat, burn" "steam" "heat, burn, steam"	kemur	"smoke" (ur "fire")
bibir(i); KLY biber(e)	"strength, power"	beber beberbeber	"weight" "heavy, weighty"

There are also various items of semantic relationship, but not formal relationship, such as WCL puuy(i), MM lu "plant, tree; magic".

Mitchell and Piper (unpublished research notes) used the Holman et al. 40-word list below, which shows 9 (22.5%) exact items, 5 (12.5%) partial, and 3 (7.5%) semantically related words. However, this list was designed for use with Euro-Asian languages, and is perhaps somewhat inappropriate; for example, no horned animals exist, neither language has a verb ‘come’, and Holman et al. assume one form for 'we'; WCL has 4, and MM has 2.

PCD Proto Central-District Papuan Austronesian, PETrf Proto East Trans Fly; POC Proto Oceanic Austronesian; PP Proto Paman; PSEPap Proto South-East Papuan Austronesian [neighbouring languages noted : Papuan : Gizrra, Bine/Kunini, Wipi (Eastern Trans Fly Family), Kiwai (Trans-New Guinea Phylum), Idi, Agöb (Pahoturi family); Australian : Gudang, and the Northern Cape York Language, dialects : Wudhadhi, Atampaya, Angkamuthi, Yadhaykenu]

word	MM	Gizrra	Bine	Wipi	PETrF	Kiwai	Idi/Agöb	WCL	Gudang	Urradhi	PP	PSEPap
louse	nem	ngüóm, ngóm	ngaamo, ngame, ngamwe	ngüɨm	*ŋamͻ	nimo	A. kabana	aari (unknown origin)	aaku tick, louse	aku tick, louse	--	--
two	neis	nis	neneni	nœmog cf. MM mog "piece"	*ni-[isV]	netewa, Bamu teibo	komblebe	ùka- "two" ùkasar(a) "two (only)" (-sar(a) "small number")	ilaabayu (cf. Y inychantu, At/A ilvan many)	Y/A udhima, At udhyama/makyaana, W aroma/adhoma	*gujarra	*drua
water (1)	gur "salt water"	-gul- "wash" bapür- PlOb, apür VN	atnana wash VN	gony "washing" imangena "swimming"	*gulV "water, swim, wash"	obo, Kope oru'o wash self VN	I. tetu "wash", A. bemine "sea water"	wœr~wur~uur~wœir "water"	G ungunya salt water	--	--	*wair "water"
water (2) (fresh; drink, juice)	ni	naiy, nai, nae	niye, niiye	ni, niya, nyɨ, ngi	*niya/*nayi	obo	ni	ngùki	--	--	*ŋugu/*ŋugi	--
ear cf. hear	laip, girip	gublang, gublam	tablamo	yɨpiya, yɨpyar, yɨkɨpya, yɨrpya, irkɨpia ear; yɨpiarom, yakrom outer early	*?(+*raamo leaf)	gare ear, sepate lobe, external ear	ran ear, ika external ear, A. laandra	kaura kurusai- (in compounds)	iwunya	Y iwuny At ikuchi W iwui	*gaalu	--
death	eud death; eumi Sg, baum PL "die"; bud "mourning"	büdül "dead", budül- "die"	budre death; (w)uje die	budɨ "death"; (w)uj(e) "dead, death"	*wudi "die"	odio, P para, M uparu "dead"; orisiai, M/Kerewo oihiai "die"	kududar "die"	uum(a) "death, unconsciousness" awum(a) "mourning, wailing" (for a death) buudh(a) "white paint" (traditionally used for mourning)	ithuurra/ithuulma "dead"	Y/A yuthu, At ruthu, W alghan "dead", W unga "mourn", U alga "death"	--	--
I	ka	kó	cane, kane	kon	*ka(nV)	mai	ngén, A. ngana	ngayi	G []yuba, aipaana	Y/A/At ayu(va)	*ŋayi	--
liver	o	konkon (puringai)	owolaamo, uweraame	wurom, vurom, sukəp, tsɨkɨp	*ͻwͻ +*raamͻ "leaf" *siba+kapu	K/Kerewo beu, M beo M siba "heart", D sibo "heart")	A. yoa/siba/zebe	siib(a) liver; centre	iipa "heart"	Y/A yipa, At lipa, W tepa, tipa	*jiba	--
eye	ponì (unknown origin) erkep	ilküp, ilkóküp	irecu	yɨr, yer "eye", yɨrkɨp, ilkɨp, yɨrtyen, yɨttwin "eyeball"	*iri "see", *kapu "seed, body part, fruit, etc."	damari, Kerewo idomai	kalye, A. yende "eye ", ikép/ikapa "eye-ball" (kép "egg")	pùrka (unknown origin) daan(a) (also "pool", "life", "kernel", "shell-food") cf. -kap(u) "body part"	daanha, rathair	Y anngal, At ipanh, A angwaa, W yeithi/yithi	--	*dano "lake, pool"
hand	tag	tang, tan arm, hand	imo "hand, arm"	yɨm	*taaŋV, *iimo "hand, arm"	K tu, Bamu tuu hand, arm	tang, A. tranga	geth(a) (unknown origin)	arta	Y/At/A mata, W ara	*mara	*taŋa
hear	asor-	-rrkrru-, -rrkurru-	-tecij- (-tecind-~cind-) hear, ätecija VN hear/listen	utkunj~utkund-	*Vrkundi	irovidiro, Mawata erebidiro, Kope orovidio VN	A. dandarla	karnge[mi]-, kœrngai VN; kùrùsai- ear	?	Y/A/At ami-	--	*roŋor
tree (also "plant", "wood", "magic")	lu(g) "tree, plant, magic"	nugup "tree"	uli, uri "tree, plant"	wul(a), ul "tree"	*wuli, *[ln]ugu[p] "tree"	ota "tree, plant", Kope nu'a "tree"	lu, A. ra/rati-ra/ro	puuy(i), OKY puuRi; yuu "spit, skewer"	puri "tree", yuuku "wood", upiirri "medicine"	Y/At/A yuku "wood, tree, stick, log", Y/At/A upirri "sore, painful, witchcraft"	*lugu "tree, wood"	*pu[l]i magic
fish	lar (unknown origin)	wapi, wapui	kibu, cupya, kopae, kopäi	kabum; waji	--	arimina/irisina food, fish; Kerewo na, Kope nai fish	kwalba	waapi (unknown origin)	waapi	Y yatpan/yadpa, A inhanyii, W nheya	--	--
name	nei	ngi, ngui	ngi	ni, niœ, nyœ	*nyilya	paina, Kerewo paena	ben, A. bena	nel Saibai variant nei	yini	At angyal, A anyii, W anyel	--	--
stone	bakìr (unknown origin)	inglkup, inglkurp	kula, kura	gli(muz), gɨmo, gɨmokɨp, kula, guma, nadi, motɨr	*kula	kura, M nora	dadar, A. dader	kùla	uulpa	Y/A aypany, At aypanh	*gul(g)an	--
tooth	tìrìg cf. ereg "eat" deg "edge, side"	zirgup (gup body part, fruit, etc.	giricu; cidi "edge"	orkak or- "eat", kak "bone" dɨng "thorn"	*daŋa "tooth, edge, etc."	ibuanara, Parama iawa; K iawa "incisor"	dhéndhég "bite INF"; A. ngui, nggoia, uguwoi "tooth"; A lenge, lenga "tooth"	dhang(a) (also "edge")	ampu	Y/A ampu, At ngampu	*jaaŋa "tooth, edge, etc."	--
breast (cf. mother, milk)	nano ama, apu "mum, mother, aunty" nanosus "milk" (sus "white sap", "foam")	ngum, ngiam, ngüam; aip mother	ngaamo, nono; mago "mother", yääye "Mum"	ngom, ngum, ngiam, ngɨmb, ngɨmdor; mog, ag "mother"	*ŋaamͻ "breast, mother" *maago mother *susu "breast, milk"	bodoro; aida, M maramu, Bamu onoo, Kerewo mamo mother	ngém/nono "breast"; nene "mother"	ama "mum, mother, aunty" aapu(wa) "mother, aunt" susu (also "white sap"; "loaf"), susuikai "milk" (ikai "juice, sap")	[]yuungu "breast, milk", athiinya "mother"	Y/At/A ungunyu "mother, breast, milk" A also awucha, yathu "milk", W nono "mother, breast"	*ŋam[u/a]ŋ "breast, mother" *juju "breast, milk"	*susu "breast, milk"
path	gab	kwat, kuat	gaabo, raare	nia, nga, nyau	*gaabͻ	gabo	nyénggo	yabu, KLY yaabu	alka	Y/A ulumu, At ulumu/anyaarra	?	POC *tyapu
you Sg	ma	ma	maane, maano	man(a)	*ma(nV)	rai	be (S/Du/Pl)	KLY/KulY/KY ni KKY/OKY ngi	(an)tuuba/tuuba	Y/At antu(va), A antu(ba), W endouva	*ŋin/*nin	*kau
fire	ur	uur	ulikobo, uliobo, urikobe, ulikobe, olobo, uli, Kunini muye-uliobo	uur, [wul(a)]para	*uur[], *kͻbͻ, *pVrV "fire", *wuli "tree, wood"	era, Bamu mahi	yu	mui (Boigu,KY also mœi)	uma	Y/At/A uma, W entovo	*tuma	--
tongue	werut	ulit	wätä, wärtä, warta, wate	welat, we(y)at, vlat, yat	*wilͻtV	watotorope, Kerewo mototobe	A. dogmar, dangamai	nœi (unknown origin)	unt[h]aar[r]a	Y yalan, punhu, At lalan, A yalan	--	--
skin	gegur; tep skin of fruit	sopai, sopae; kwan, kuan bark	tääpo, tääpe, taape, tääpwo; uli tääpo (etc.) bark	gɨm (one dialect gunja); wul gɨm, gɨm, yug bark	*taapi	tama	thoe	gœngáw(u), KLY gœngaawu, KulY gœngáy(u)	ikwurra skin ranga bark	Y/At/A akuny skin, bark	*Cagurr	
night	ki	irrüb, irrub, irrib	kiye, ciye	sɨwɨny, sɨwɨn, sowɨny, sɨrɨn, sowi, tsowony, sɨwɨng, sɨrɨng, sɨrɨm	*kiya	duo, Bamu duwo	A. kuteine, kwete	kubil (derived, kùbi "charcoal")	G yulpalga night, darkness	Y yupul, Y manara, At manma night, darkness, W jagula	--	--
leaf	(lu)lam (lu "plant")	lam, lang (mainly compounds), pórgae~prangai, prórngae, pórngae	laamo, racme, raame	(wulœ)rom (wulœ "tree")	*laamͻ "leaf"	ota-pasa, M ota-pea (ota tree)	oro-popo/ru-pi/ro-rual (oro/ru/ro tree, plant); (lu)pi (lu tree, plant)	niis(a)	itrara "leaf"	Y/At/A yukum yampa (yuku "tree, wood"), A ithagha, W alway; Y/At/A yampa "leaf, flower, lung"; AT yamparra, A inparra "lung"	--	--
blood	mam (unknown origin)	ói, óe	uudi	woi, woj, kus, ku	*wodi	arima, Kope ora	A. mem, mam, teia	kùlka (unknown origin)	ichunya	Y/A lukuny, At uchuny	--	--
horn	--	--	--	--	--	--	--	--	--	--	--	--
person	-am/-iam; le	-pam; pam, pama	-yame/-yamo; binamo, biname, binam; imä, im male, rooriye, loori "man"	-am, -iam; rɨga "man, male" leo "husband"	*pyama; *[rl]i[g]ͻ	dubu, Kerewo meréha; arubi,-rubi people, Kerewo oubi; Kope dubuiro person, man; M auana man, didiri men, mere male	la "man"	-ig(a) personal nominaliser) mabaig(a) (derived, lit. "walker", maab(a) "walk"	ama	Y/At/A ama	*bama	--
knee (1)	kolo	--	(ngawengawe elbow)	kumkak, yɨmkak elbow (kak bone)	*kͻlͻ "knee, elbow, corner"	--	--	kulu cf. kudu "elbow", kœru "corner"	yurtu elbow	Y/At yutu, A yurtu elbow	*yurru "elbow"	*turu "knee, elbow"
knee (2)	kokni kok "leg joint+?" wageb "kneecap"	wagusingül, wagósingül, wagasingól	koko/coco(rar/kaako) (rare, kaako, kak, ror "bone")	kɨ, kɨror, kum; kumop knee ball, (mop "end, head")	*kͻkͻ "leg joint"	popu knee, elbow	D tubu, tang-kum; putukupi kneecap; A tran-kwimbe elbow	kokan(i) "kneecap"; kuku inside part of knee, knee joint	iingku knee	Y/A/At wungku, W owen	PP *wuŋgu[ ] "knee"	--
one/other	nerut "another" wader "some, others" (unknown origin) netat one	darrpan, dórpan "one, one of group" darrü "other" (+ -pan)	yepä, neetera one; nuuja other, another	yepa one; nɨnda other, others, some; b’enga other, another (different)	*ni+[rl]ͻtV other *[yi/dVr]pͻnV, *ni+ta[tr]V "one"	ata, Bamu kaiibi one, other, nau one	A. tupulibi	wara, war "one of group, other" (unknown origin) dhurai "some, others" wœrapùn, ùrapùn, ùrpùn (older waraponi) "one only" wara "one of group, other" + -pùn[i]	ipiyamanha inyaanha another	Y/A ipima, Y also ipinyama, At nhipima; W wema one, alone Y unya, At unyinha, wanhu, A unyinha other, different W emo other	*nyupun, *NipiyamaNa	--
nose	pit "nose, beak, point (of land)"	syók	keke, cece	so, sok, sokak (kak bone)	?	wodi, Kope modi (cf. Bamu pito hole)	A. murung, wede	piti "nose" (unknown origin; buna beak; nguur point)	iyi nose, beak	Y/A iyi, W enmoi, nundagel; At umughanhu	--	--
full	(e)osmer (lit. "protrude, show self": unknown origin)	buku, iib	puuwe	ngor full(ness)	?	Kerewo arara'ohuai	--	1) gùdapœlam(a) (derived : "opening-SpecLOC+cause-VerbForm) (2) KLY/KulY/MY-KY pùsakar(a), cf. sakar "space"	mur[r]ku gorged	Y/At/A wampan full/swollen, W weithinyo full	--	--
come (1)	ta-, te-, ti-, t-	to'-, tü-	t- (s- allophone)	t- irrealis; ik-, -itk-, -etk- come, tu[i]- Pl, menamena, menon go, come VN	*ta "come, approach"	-ogu-, Kerewo -oho-, Kope -o'u- go, come	-be-	ngapa TR/INTR adverb, cf. nga- 1st person, pa- telic, -pa dative bœi INTR adverb, cf. pœipai, KKY bœi "nearside"	impiibinhu come, approach (-nhu DAT), ainpirra go	Y/A/W ana, At ana/anma go, come	--	--
come (2) (imperative)	taba (ta-ba "come-INTR"), maiem (?+ALL)	--	tädi M, tocli F	ayo	--	--	abe Sg, yebe PL; A yau	aye, KKY aya imperative adverb (Malay or similar loan : ayo, ayu)	--	--	--	*mai "come"
star	wer	wimurr	wale, walo, gugie, griga (see sun, day)	ikui, ɨki, ɨkwi, guje (one dialect bedam)	*wa[rl]i	gugi, M zogubo, Kope oroi'io	A. piro, kwatai	Wœœy(i), OKY WœœRi "Venus" thithúy(i), KLY thithuuyi, OKY thithúRi; zugub(a) constellation, significant star	uunpi	Y/At/A unpi, At wintamwintama (avoidance)	--	*waRi sun PSEPap*pituqon, PCD *pitui, *pitiu, *pitiriu "star"
hill	paser	podo hill, dorro high ground	podo, doro hill, doro mainland, shore	podo, dor hill	*pͻntͻ[r], *doro	podo, Mawata also damera; idodoro cliff	I. duidui, A. pad	paad(a) (also "top, height, crest, peak "); baudhar(a) mountain, peak	pada	Y yantal, At rantal, A yantaa; W mara mountain	*baanda "top"	*pantar "hill, mountain"
bone, leaf rib	lid	kus	kaako, kaake, caace bone; raare bone, rare shell, spoon	kak, kaak, kagɨ kak, kaga bone, stick, (hard) piece, stalk; ror bone (in compounds)	*riida/*raadi "bone, leaf rib"	soro, M kako	A. kwetr/kut	riidh(a)	athirra	Y/At/A apudha, A avoidance ikyalitha, W watha/ua	--	--
we inclusive	mi, mer- inclusive	mi	mine	men, mɨn	*mi(ni)	nimo, Kerewo imo [exc and inc.]	ybi	ngœba dual inclusive ngalpa plural inclusive	?	Y/At/A ali(va) DU, ana(va) PL	*ŋali inclusive; *ŋana(pula) (dual) exclusive	*kita
we exclusive	ki, ker- exclusive	ki	kine, cine	sɨn	*ki(ni)	nimo, Kerewo imo [exc and inc.]	bi, A. ba	ngalbai, KKY ngalbe, archaic KulY ngœibai, dual exclusive ngœi, ngœlmù-, KKY/MY-KY ngœimù-, OKY ngœRi(mù-) plural exclusive	aaku	Y/A/At ampu(la)	*ŋali inclusive; *ŋana(pula) (dual) exclusive	*kami
drink (verb)	iri	-(a)nan-	ene-	-ona-~-ena- Sg, anain- NSg	*ini/ani/ina	Kope idio drink, odio he is drinking	A. ine/ngi -ni-/-na- drink water (-ni/na- eat)	wani- (unknown origin; derived? < wanai- "put" active stem)	ungkenka drink	Y/At ungye, A ungya drink, eat; W ical drink	--	--
see, find	dasmer, erdar (stem er-)	-sen- see	-pän, pan- see, find, ire see VN	yɨr -ong- (ong bite), yɨr -a- see, look, yeri-, yiry-, oraka VN find, search, ɨdar Sg, adar NSg find	*ira see	eáuri see VN	-ndee- see	iima-	angkanya find	W iangin find	*kiima "see"	--
new	kerkar	küsil, küsül, kósil new; kari, karian little, small	kirece, mamye, cireni, mamie~karte new; matimati, matikäli, matikolä, matikola, matikari, geglo little, small	sisel, sisɨl	*kari[kari]/*kira[kira]	oliómoto	--	kayin(a)	--	--	--	--
dog	omai	umai, umae, ume	drenggo, drego, drengo	yongg, yongk, yongga, yangg, yoorɨnk	*omái	Kerewo kaukau, Kope umu	dréngg	ùmai	ingkud[h]iinya	Y/At/A utagha	*gudaga	--
sun, day	gerger "day, daylight" lìm "sun"	abüs, óbüs	bimu, abeji, abweji, abuji; gugie, griga "star"	bibɨr day, lom, lomkongga, lemkogal, ganggal sun (konga, kogal "woman")	*limͻ/*lͻmi	M iwio, Parama ivio, Kerewo hewio, Kope hivio sun; sai day	yébodh sun	gœiga, gœygœyi-, gœigi-, OKY gœRigaR(i)	inga	Y/At/A wunga, W unga, W mungbatho day	*gari, *wuŋa	--

== Recent loans ==
The main source of loan words to the language since the mid 1800s has been Yumplatòk (Torres Strait Creole) and English. There are also some minor loans from Lifu/Drehu, Polynesian (in particular Samoan and to a lesser extent Rotuman), Indonesian, Philippine, Japanese, and European origin. Many such outsiders were recruited – or in some rare cases black-birded – in the 19th century for pearl diving and other marine work, while others (from Lifu and Samoa) were missionaries with the British and Foreign Bible Society.

== Dialects ==
The language is currently dialectless. However, there was once a separate dialect spoken on Erub and Ugar islands, characterised in part by the retention of phonemic distinctions between 'ng', 'g', 'n' and 'r' where these have fallen together in two ways in Meriam Mir. The sound 'ng' in Modern Meriam has become 'n' at the beginning of words and 'g' within words; 'n' in many cases has become 'r' within words. Examples are remembered in one important Erub folktale (Lawrie 1970:283–284):

Erub : Aka nade ki andinane? Ge au?

Mer : Aka nade ki ardirare? Ge au?

Where will we put it? There?

Erub : Mena inggandane/ingandane! Keniba uzen unken a keniba imut unken.

Mer : Mena igardare! Keriba uzer urker a keriba imut urker.

Keep carrying it! Our paddles and our poling poles are still strong.

The earliest records (early 19th century) of Meriam Mìr included the phrase debelang good taste/nice, in present-day Meriam Mìr debe lag. This shows that the 'ng' > 'n'/'g' change is of fairly recent date; lang, now lag, is identical to the Gizrra lang of the same meaning.

== Phonology ==
=== Vowels ===
	Front	Back
High	i ⟨i⟩	u ⟨u⟩
Near-high	ɪ ⟨ì⟩	ʊ ⟨ù⟩
Mid	e, ɛ ⟨e⟩	o ⟨o⟩
Low	a, ʌ ⟨a⟩	ɔ ⟨o⟩⟨ò⟩

The sounds represented by [a] and [ʌ] are allophonic. [ʌ] appears mainly in syllables before the stress accent and optionally in open unstressed syllables otherwise. [a] appears in stressed syllables and in unstressed closed syllables.

For some speakers the following pairs exhibit variation, and perhaps have unidentified allophonic variation: [e], [ɛ] and [ɪ] (mainly Erub/Ulag), [ɪ] and [i] (mainly Mer), [u] and [ʊ], [ʊ] and [o], and [o] and [ɔ]. Older speakers appear to keep the vowels more distinct.

=== Consonants ===
		Bilabial	Alveolar	Palatal	Velar
Stop	Voiceless	p	t		k
Stop	Voiced	b	d		ɡ
Nasal		m	n		
Fricative	Voiceless		s		
Fricative	Voiced		z		
Lateral			l		
Tap			ɾ		
Semivowel		w		j	

/ɾ/ is heard as [ɹ] when occurring before or after consonants.

=== Stress ===
Stress is contrastive in Meriam and can occur on the first or second syllable. Examples include tábo 'snake', tabó 'neck'.

== Sign language ==
The Torres Strait Islanders have signed forms of their languages, though it is not clear from records that they are particularly well-developed compared to other Australian Aboriginal sign languages.

== See also ==
- Torres Strait Island languages

== Bibliography ==
- Dixon, R. M. W. (2002). Australian Languages: Their Nature and Development. Cambridge: Cambridge University Press.
- Mitchell, Rod (April 2015), "Ngalmun Lagaw Yangukudu: The Language of our Homeland in Goemulgaw Lagal: Cultural and Natural Histories of the Island of Mabuyag, Torres Strait", Memoirs of the Queensland Museum – Culture, 8 (1): 323–446, ISSN 1440-4788
- Passi, Gamalai Ken; Piper, Nick (1994). "Meryam Mir". In Nick Thieberger; William McGregor (eds.). Macquarie Aboriginal Words. Macquarie Library. pp. 320–351.
- Piper, N. (1989). A sketch grammar of Meryam Mer. MA thesis. Australian National University.
- Ross, Malcolm (2005). "Pronouns as a preliminary diagnostic for grouping Papuan languages". In Andrew Pawley; Robert Attenborough; Robin Hide; Jack Golson (eds.). Papuan pasts: cultural, linguistic and biological histories of Papuan-speaking peoples. Canberra: Pacific Linguistics. pp. 15–66.
- Lawrie, Margaret (1970). Myths and Legends of Torres Strait. St. Lucia: University of Queensland Press.
