= Segero Creek =

River in Papua New Guinea

Segero Creek Segera River, Sagero Creek
- Location within Papua New Guinea

Location
- Country: Papua New Guinea
- Region: Western Province

Physical characteristics
- Source
  - location: Papua New Guinea
- Mouth
  - coordinates: 8°13′53″S 143°32′11″E

Segero Creek (also Segera River or Sagero Creek) is a creek located in Western Province, Papua New Guinea.

Segero village (8.232149°S 143.536743°E), where the Tabo language is spoken, is located on banks of the creek.

== See also ==
- List of rivers of Papua New Guinea
- Tabo language
