= Bitur language =

Tirio language spoken in Papua New Guinea

Bitur
- Mutum
- Native to: Papua New Guinea
- Native speakers: (860 cited 2000 census)
- Language family: Trans–New Guinea: Fly River (Anim); Tirio; Tirio–Bitur–Were; Bitur

Language codes
- ISO 639-3: mcc
- Glottolog: bitu1242

Bitur (Bituri, Paswam, Mutum) is a Papuan language of Western Province, Papua New Guinea.

Bitur is spoken in Bisuaka (8.540481°S 142.70092°E), Kasimap (8.589363°S 142.841446°E), Petom (8.624387°S 142.688669°E), Tewara (8.51406°S 142.753434°E), and Upiara (8.546301°S 142.64927°E) villages of Oriomo-Bituri Rural LLG.
