= Tabo language =

Isolate language spoken in Papua New Guinea

Waia
- Tabo
- Region: Western Province, Papua New Guinea
- Native speakers: 3,000 (2002)
- Language family: Language isolate or Trans-Fly: Waia

Language codes
- ISO 639-3: knv
- Glottolog: tabo1241
- ELP: Tabo
- Map: The Waia language of New Guinea The Waia language (south center) Trans–New Guinea languages Other Papuan languages Austronesian languages Uninhabited

Tabo, also known as Waia (Waya), is a Papuan language of Western Province, Papua New Guinea, just north of the Fly River delta. The language has also been known as Hiwi and Hibaradai.

Tabo means ‘word, mouth’ and is the name of the language, whereas Waia is the name of one of the ten villages where Tabo is spoken.

== Classification ==
Tabo is not close to other languages. Evans (2018) classifies it as a language isolate. Usher (2020) includes it in the Trans-Fly family. Part of the uncertainty is because many of the attested words of Tabo are loans from Gogodala or Kiwai, reducing the number of native Tabo words that can be used for comparison and thus making classification difficult.

== Demographics ==
In Gogodala Rural LLG, Western Province, Papua New Guinea, Tabo is spoken in:

- Lower Aramia River: Alagi (8.053774°S 142.961739°E), Galu, Saiwase (7.958242°S 143.203232°E), and Waya (7.984933°S 143.182042°E) villages
- Bamu River: Alikinapi village
- Lower Fly River: Kenedibi (8.240667°S 143.380404°E), Urio (8.239063°S 143.394333°E), and Wagumi-Sarau villages
- Segero Creek: Segero village (8.232149°S 143.536743°E)

It is spoken by 3,500 people mainly in the southern part Bamu Rural LLG of Western Province.

== Phonology ==
The phonemic inventory of Tabo is given below.

Consonants
b, d, ɡ, p, t, k, m, n, l, w, j, h, s
Vowels
i, e, æ, a, o, u

== Vocabulary ==
The following basic vocabulary words are from Reesink (1976) and Wurm (1973), as cited in the Trans-New Guinea database:

| gloss | Tabo |
|---|---|
| head | wato |
| hair | hinibó; hinibɔ |
| ear | galo |
| eye | ba ͥdi; baidi |
| nose | dopo; dɔ:pɔ |
| tooth | lalo; lolo |
| tongue | mɛlpila; merapira |
| leg | nato |
| louse | tamani |
| dog | gaha |
| bird | hola; hola: |
| egg | kikipo |
| blood | hawi; haᵘwi |
| bone | goha; goha: |
| skin | tama |
| breast | nono |
| tree | ke'ha; kɛha |
| man | dubu; tubu |
| woman | kamena |
| sun | kadepa; kadɛpa |
| moon | manome; manomi |
| water | bea |
| fire | koe; kue: |
| stone | -nadi; naki |
| road, path | gabo |
| name | mahiro; mahiřo |
| eat | hɛna; nɛ:na |
| one | kapia |
| two | nete'ewa |
