= Eastern Trans-Fly languages =

Language family of New Guinea

Eastern Trans-Fly
- Oriomo
- Geographic distribution: Oriomo Plateau, Papua New Guinea, Torres Strait Islands (Australia)
- Linguistic classification: Trans-Fly or independent language family: Eastern Trans-Fly

Language codes
- Glottolog: east2503
- Map: The Eastern Trans-Fly languages of New Guinea The Eastern Trans-Fly languages Trans–New Guinea languages Other Papuan languages Austronesian languages Australian languages Uninhabited

The Eastern Trans-Fly (or Oriomo) languages are a small independent family of Papuan languages spoken in the Oriomo Plateau to the west of the Fly River in New Guinea.

== Classification ==
The languages constituted a branch of Stephen Wurm's 1970 Trans-Fly proposal, which he later incorporated into his 1975 expansion of the Trans–New Guinea family as part of a Trans-Fly – Bulaka River branch. They are retained as a family but removed from Trans–New Guinea in the classifications of Malcolm Ross and Timothy Usher.

Wurm had determined that some of the languages he classified as Trans-Fly were not actually part of the Trans-New Guinea family but were instead heavily influenced by Trans-New Guinea languages. In 2005, Ross removed most of these languages, including Eastern Trans-Fly, from Wurm's Trans-New Guinea classification.

Timothy Usher links the four languages, which he calls Oriomo Plateau, to the Pahoturi languages and the Tabo language in an expanded Eastern Trans-Fly family.

== Languages ==
- Meriam (within the national borders of Australia)
- Bine
- Wipi (Gidra)
- Gizrra

Oriomo (Eastern Trans-Fly) languages and respective demographic information listed by Evans et al. (2018) are provided below. Geographical coordinates are also provided for each dialect (which are named after villages).

List of Oriomo (Eastern Trans-Fly) languages
Language	Location	Population	Alternate names	Dialects
Gizrra	south Oriomo-Bituri Rural LLG, Western Province (Papua New Guinea)	1,050	Gizra	Western Gizra and Waidoro (9.199001°S 142.758852°E) dialects
Bine	south Oriomo-Bituri Rural LLG, Western Province (Papua New Guinea)	2,000		Kunini (9.091499°S 143.009076°E), Boze-Giringarede (9.06073°S 143.03836°E), Sogal (8.93995°S 142.841073°E), Masingle (9.130976°S 142.950793°E), Tate (9.078728°S 142.877514°E), Irupi-Drageli (9.135394°S 142.862977°E; 9.161472°S 142.892287°E), and Sebe (9.050889°S 142.698247°E) dialects
Wipi	east Oriomo-Bituri Rural LLG, Western Province (Papua New Guinea)	3,500	Wipim, Gidra, Oriomo, Jibu	Dorogori (9.029768°S 143.215139°E), Abam (8.926818°S 143.19112°E), Peawa (8.886084°S 143.192049°E), Ume (9.021446°S 143.069507°E), Kuru (8.901837°S 143.074435°E), Woigo (8.897189°S 143.19818°E), Wonie (8.836602°S 142.974578°E), Iamega (8.768564°S 142.91733°E), Gamaewe (8.954618°S 142.932798°E), Podari (8.862731°S 142.860353°E), Wipim (8.786604°S 142.871224°E), Kapal (8.620541°S 142.815635°E), Rual (8.570315°S 142.85601°E), Guiam, and Yuta dialects
Meryam Mir	Australia: Torres Strait Islands of Erub (Darnley Island), Ugar (Stephen Island), and Mer (Murray Island)	700	Meriam Mir	Erub (no longer used) and Mer dialects

== Pronouns ==
The pronouns Ross reconstructs for proto–Eastern Trans-Fly are:

I	*ka	exclusive we	*ki
I	*ka	inclusive we	*mi
thou	*ma	you	*we
he/she/it	*tabV; *e	they	*tepi

There is a possibility of a connection here to Trans–New Guinea. If the inclusive pronoun is historically a second-person form, then there would appear to be i-ablaut for the plural: *ka~ki, **ma~mi, **tapa~tapi. This is similar to the ablaut reconstructed for TNG (*na~ni, *ga~gi). Although the pronouns themselves are dissimilar, ablaut is not likely to be borrowed. On the other hand, there is some formal resemblance to Austronesian pronouns (*(a)ku I, *(ka)mu you, *kita we inc., *(ka)mi we exc., *ia he/she/it; some archeological, cultural and linguistic evidence of Austronesian contact and settlement in the area exists.

== Vocabulary comparison ==
The following basic vocabulary words for Bine (Täti dialect), Bine (Sogal dialect), Gizra (Kupere dialect) and Wipi (Dorogori dialect) are from the Trans-New Guinea database. The equivalent words for Meriam Mir are also included.

The words cited constitute translation equivalents, whether they are cognate (e.g. iřeʔu, iřeku, ilkʰəp for “eye”) or not (e.g. dřeŋgo, ume, yɔŋg for “dog”).

gloss	Bine (Täti dialect)	Bine (Sogal dialect)	Gizra (Kupere dialect)	Wipi (Dorogori dialect)	Meriam Mir
head	mopo	mopo	siŋɨl	mopʰ	kìrìm
hair	ede ŋæři	mopo ŋæři	eřŋen	mop ŋɨs	mus
ear	tablam	tablamo	gublam	yəkəpya	girip, laip
eye	iřeʔu	iřeku	ilkʰəp	yəř	erkep
nose	keke	keke	siəkʰ	sok	pit
tooth	giřiʔu		ziřgup		tìrìg
tongue	wætæ	wærtæ	uːlitʰ	vlat	werut
leg	er̃ŋe	er̃ŋe	wapʰər̃	kwa	teter
louse	ŋamwe	ŋamo	ŋəm	bɨnɨm	nem
dog	dřego	dřeŋgo	ume	yɔŋg	omai
pig	blomwe	blomo		b'om	borom
bird	eře	eře	pʰöyɑy	yi	ebur
egg	ku	ku	uŕgup	kʰɨp	wer
blood	uːdi	uːdi	əi	wɔːdž	mam
bone	kaːke	kaːko	kʰus	kʰakʰ	lid
skin	tæːpwe	tæːpo	sopʰai	gɨm	gegur
breast	nono	ŋamo	ŋiam	ŋɔm	nano
tree	uli	uli	nugup	wʉl	lu(g)
man	řoːřie	řoːřie	pʰam	r̃ɨga	kimiar
woman	magebe	magobe	kʰoːl	kʰɔŋga	koskìr
sun	abwedži	bimu	abɨs	lom	lìm
moon	mřeːpwe	mabye	mɛlpal	mobi	meb
water	niːye	niːye	nai	ni	nì
fire	ulobo	ulikobo	uːř	par̃a	ur
stone	kula	kula	iŋlkʰup	gli	bakìr
name	ŋi	ŋi	ŋi	niː	nei
eat			waː aloda	nina wavwin	ero
one	neːteřa	yepæ	dər̃pʰan	yəpa	netat
two	neneni	neneni	niːs	nɨmɔg	neis
