= Oriomo Plateau =

Plateau in Papua New Guinea

- Location within Papua New Guinea

Geography
- State: Papua New Guinea
- Range coordinates: 8.37811°S 141.53536°E

The Oriomo Plateau is a plateau in Western Province, Papua New Guinea.

The Oriomo languages are spoken in the region.

== See also ==
- Oriomo-Bituri Rural LLG
- Oriomo Plateau languages
- Oriomo River
