= Oriomo River =

River in Papua New Guinea

Coordinates: 9°02′09″S 143°10′55″E

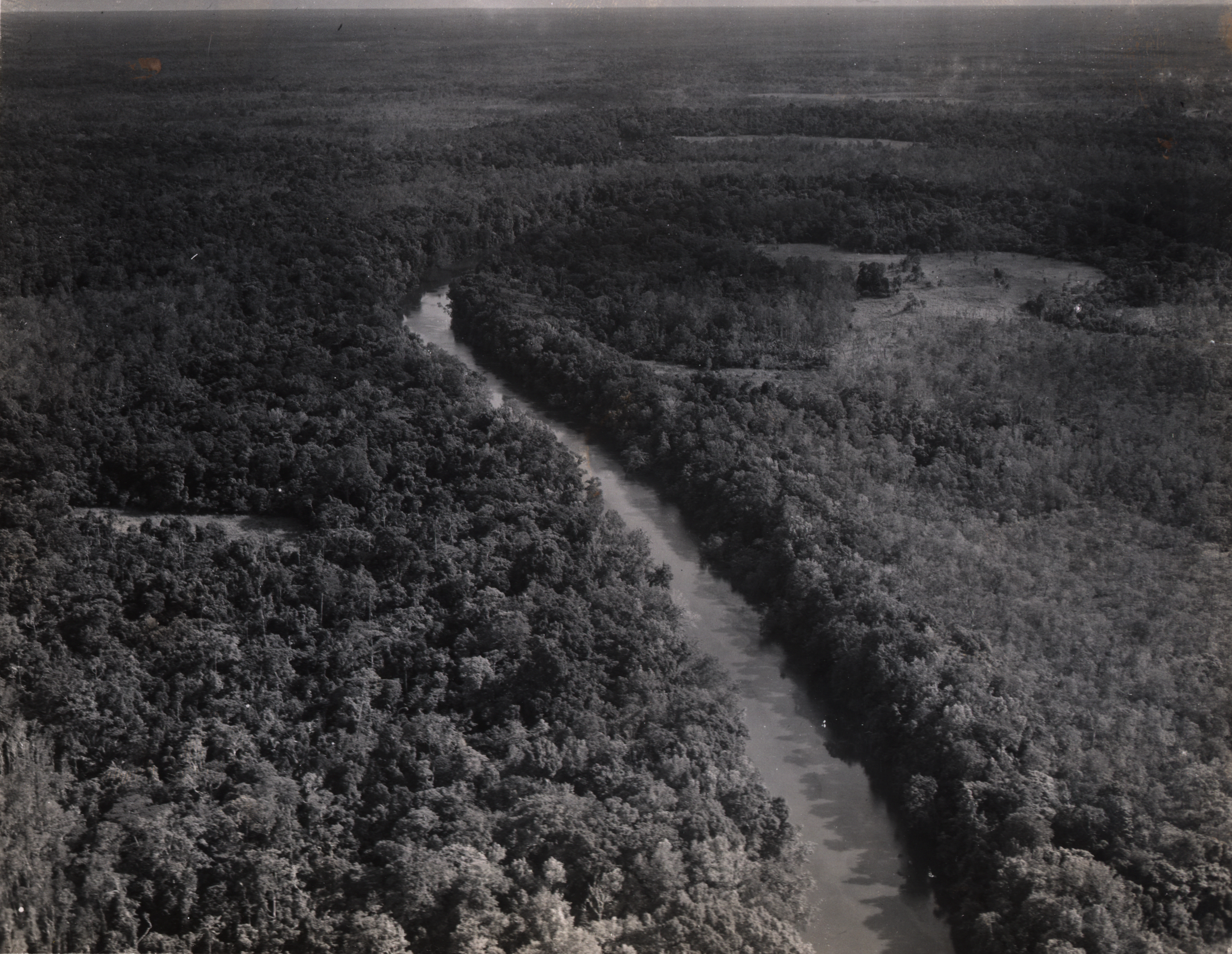
- Oriomo River, ca. 1937

Location
- Country: Papua New Guinea
- Region: Western Province

Physical characteristics
- Source
  - location: Papua New Guinea
- Mouth: Coral Sea
  - location: Western Province
- Length: 86 km (53 mi)
- Basin size: 1,250.3 km^{2} (482.7 sq mi)
- Discharge
  - location: Near mouth
  - average: 46.9 m^{3}/s (1,660 cu ft/s)

The Oriomo River is located in southern Papua New Guinea. Originating on the Oriomo Plateau, it enters the sea near the town of Daru.

== See also ==
- Oriomo-Bituri Rural LLG
- Oriomo languages
- Oriomo Plateau
