= Bine language =

Trans-Fly language spoken in Papua New Guinea

Bine
- Native to: Papua New Guinea
- Native speakers: (2,000 cited 2000)
- Language family: Trans-Fly: Eastern Trans-Fly; Bine

Language codes
- ISO 639-3: bon
- Glottolog: bine1240

Bine, also known as Pine, Kunini, Masingara or Oriomo (a name shared with Wipi), is a Papuan language of New Guinea. Glottolog lists the following varieties: Boze-Giringarede, Irupi-Drageli, Kunini, Masingle, Sebe, Sogal and Täti.

Speakers refer to the language as either bine mene (Bine language) or kewe mene (village language).

== Regional differences ==
Bine is usually divided into two standard dialects by linguists, the Eastern dialect and the Western dialect, which in turn are divided into many regional varieties. Most of the distinction between the two is phonological. One instance of this is the occurrence of rhotasicm in some dialects. In the some dialects, such as the Boze-Giringarede, Täti, Sogal, and Masigle variants, /l/ has rhotacised to become /r/. Other dialects, such as the Kunini, Irupi-Drageli and Sebe variants, on the other hand, have not undergone this change and have preserved the original /l/. (maru, in the rhotacising dialects, meaning 'beach', but malu in non-rhotacising dialects). Another example of phonological distinction is debuccalization in certain dialects. In the Masingle, Kunini and Täti variants, /k/ has shifted to /ʔ/ in word-initial and word-medial positions, while in other variants, such as the Sebe, Sogal and Irupi-Drageli variants, /k/ is retained. (compare the Masingle, Kunini and Täti variants ʔiyeʔiye meaning 'tomorrow' and the first person singular pronoun ʔane, to their equivalents kiyekiye and kane in the Irupi-Drageli, Sebe and Sogal variants) Some dialects use both phonemes. The dialects also differentiate in pronunciation of vowels. in both the Masingle and the Irupi-Drageli variants, /æ/ has backened to /ɑ/ (æibi, to paddle becomes ɑibi)

== Phonology ==
=== Consonants ===
	Bilabial	Alveolar	Palatal	Velar	Glottal
Nasal	m	n		ŋ	
Stop	p b	t d	d͡ʒ	k ɡ	ʔ
Trill		r			
Fricative		s			
Approximant	w	l	j		

=== Vowels ===
	Front	Back
Close	i iː	u uː
Mid	e eː	o oː
Open	æ æː	ɑ ɑː

== Sample Text ==
Agedna cabu ca, Acejiyame te dume piiyepu gawe jaawenuji. Gawe te tacuji, gwidape lica ge gawe cabu. lyeta krokeciye ge, Acejiyame niiye cabu jemwige. Acejiyame jiiciga egä, "Apaclyera tunepmali!" Siige, apaclyera te tunepmalige. Acejiyame jepänige apaclyera lui jamyacu ge, einige bimu padare. Acejiyame pui apaclyera jebalodnemige krokeciye ca. Krokeciye ne einige ciye padare. Bimu yepä ge. Bimu neeneni cabu Acejiyame jiicige, "Niiye äpali! Poto niiye biiri arbe cabu me, poto niiye täini gawe me!" Siige, niiye te lui cabu je äplegige, gawe niiye te täinige. Pui äpli puupu Acejiyame einige dume. Bimu neeneni. nälu peese.

In the beginning God created heaven and earth. The earth was formless and empty, and darkness covered the deep water. The spirit of God was hovering over the water. Then God said, "Let there be light!" So there was light. God saw the light was good. So God separated the light from the darkness. God named the light "day", and the darkness he named "night". There was evening, then morning, the first day. Then God said, "Let there be a horizon in the middle of the water in order to separate the water". So God made the horizon and separated the water above and below the horizon. And so it was. God named what was above the horizon "sky". There was evening, then morning, a second day.

== Vocabulary ==
Comparison of vocabulary in dialects of Bine language
	Boze-Giringarede	Kunini	Masingle	Irupi-Drageli	Täti	Sebe	Sogal
tomorrow	ʔiyeʔiye	ʔiyeʔiye	ʔiyeʔiye	kiyekiye	ʔiyeʔiye	kiyekiye	kiyekiye
what	ŋena	ŋena	ŋena	ŋena	ŋena	ŋena	ŋena
dog	dreŋgo	drego	drego	dreŋgo	dreŋo	dreŋgo	dreŋgo
coconut	i:ya	i:ya	i:ya	i:ya	i:ya	i:ya	i:ya
pig	blomo	blome	blome	brome	blomwe	blomo	blomo
root	brændo	brædžu	mrado	marando	brando	brando	brando
paddle	æibi	æibi	ɑibi	ɑibi	æibi	ɑibi	ɑibi
good	mi:ndži	mi:dži	mi:ndži	mi:ndži	mi:ži	mi:ndži	mi:ndži
beach	maru	malu	maru	malu	maru	malu	maru
bird	ere	ele	ere	ele	ere	ere	ere
