= Gizrra language =

Papuan language of New Guinea

Gizrra
- Native to: Papua New Guinea
- Native speakers: 1,100 (2002)
- Language family: Trans-Fly: Eastern Trans-Fly; Gizrra

Language codes
- ISO 639-3: tof
- Glottolog: gizr1240
- ELP: Gizrra

Gizrra, or Toga, is a Papuan language of New Guinea. Its two varieties are Western Gizrra and Waidoro.

== Bibliography ==
- Nico and Elly van Bodegraven (2021). Gizrra-English Dictionary (PDF).
