= Trans-Fly languages =

Family of Papuan languages

Trans-Fly
- (proposed)
- Geographic distribution: Papua New Guinea, Torres Strait Islands (Australia)
- Linguistic classification: One of the world's primary language families
- Subdivisions: Eastern Trans-Fly; Pahoturi; Tabo

Language codes
- Glottolog: None

The Trans-Fly languages are a small family of Papuan languages proposed by Timothy Usher, that are spoken in the region of the Fly River.

== Languages ==
Trans-Fly

- Eastern Trans-Fly (Oriomo Plateau)
- Pahoturi (Paho River)
- Waia (Tabo)

== Typology ==
The inclusive vs. exclusive first-person pronoun distinction is found in the Pahoturi River and Oriomo families, as well as in the Western Torres Strait language, but not in other languages of Southern New Guinea.

== See also ==
- Trans-Fly–Bulaka River languages
